= List of Bosnia and Herzegovina films =

Because Bosnia and Herzegovina was part of Yugoslavia prior to its independence in 1992, all movies produced there were considered Yugoslavian movies. After the war, Bosnian cinema became one of the most awarded in the region. Some of the internationally acclaimed and multiple award-winning screenwriters, directors and producers include: Zlatko Topčić, Danis Tanović, Dino Mustafić, Ahmed Imamović, Ademir Kenović, Jasmila Žbanić, Pjer Žalica, Aida Begić.

== 1990s ==
Title	Director	Cast	Genre	Notes
1991
Holiday in Sarajevo	Benjamin Filipović		Dramedy	
1994
The Best Years Ever	Zlatko Topčić		Documentary	
Bosna!	Alain Ferrari, Bernard-Henri Lévy		Documentary	
Mizaldo, kraj teatra!	Semezdin Mehmedinović, Benjamin Filipovic	Bernard-Henri Lévy, Ismet Bajramovic	Mockumentary	
Magareće godine	Nenad Dizdarević	Draško Trninić, Igor Bjelan	Drama/Comedy	
MGM Sarajevo: Čovjek, Bog, Monstrum	Ismet Arnautalić, Mirsad Idrizović		Documentary	
1995
Miracle in Bosnia	Dino Mustafić, Danis Tanović		Documentary/War	Special Award at the 1995 Cannes Film Festival
The Fourth Part of the Brain	Nenad Dizdarević		Documentary	
1996
I Respond to You, God	Zlatko Topčić		Documentary	
1997
Blood and Musk	Zlatko Topčić		Documentary	
Das Jahr nach Dayton	Nikolaus Geyrhalter		Documentary	
Neočekivana šetnja	François Bašić	Senad Bašić	Drama	
Savršeni krug	Ademir Kenović	Mustafa Nadarević	Drama	
Život u krugu	Goran Dujaković		Documentary	

== 2000s ==
Title	Director	Cast	Genre	Notes
2000
Ljudi sa deponije				TV
Mliječni put	Faruk Sokolović			
Moj mrtvi grad				TV
Tunel				
2001
No Man's Land	Danis Tanović		War Drama	Best Foreign Language Film, 74th Academy Awards, Best Foreign Language Film, 58th Golden Globe Awards, Best Screenplay, 2001 Cannes Film Festival
His Highness the Wheel				TV
Hotel Hidajet				
List				
Sugar-Free				
Zivot od Milutina				
Znak				
2002
Adio Kerida				
Survived 'n Lived Through One More Day				Opst'o i ost'o jedan dan
2003
Discovery: Sarajevo				
Remake	Dino Mustafić	Ermin Bravo, François Berléand, Évelyne Bouix	Drama/History/War	Entered into the International Film Festival Rotterdam, Berlin International Film Festival, Festival du Film de Paris, New York Film Festival, Los Angeles Film Festival; Special Mention Award at the 53rd Berlin International Film Festival
Gori vatra				
Images from the Corner				
Ljeto u zlatnoj dolini				Summer in the Golden Valley
A Normal Life				
Racconto di guerra				
North Went Mad				Sjever je poludio
2004
Crna hronika				
Ispred prve linije				
Days and Hours				
Neka se ovaj film zove po meni				
Sasvim licno				
À propos de Sarajevo				
2005
Back to Bosnia	Sabina Vajraca			
Dobro ustimani mrtvaci				
Go West			Comedy drama	
Heroji za jedan dan				
Ljubav na granici				
Lost and Found				
Prva plata				
Ram za sliku moje domovine				
2006
Brod ludaka				
Grbavica	Jasmila Žbanić			Golden Bear - Berlin Film Festival 2006
Kako smo se igrali				
Mama i tata				
Nafaka				
Skies Above the Landscape				
Nikdy nebylo líp				
All for Free	Antonio Nuić	Rakan Rushaidat, Nataša Janjić, Emir Hadžihafizbegović	Drama	
2007
Duhovi Sarajeva				
Balkanski sindrom				
In the Name of the Son	Harun Mehmedinović	Sergej Trifunović		
2008
Snow				

== 2010s ==
Title	Director	Cast	Genre	Notes
2010
On the Path	Jasmila Žbanić			Entered into the 60th Berlin International Film Festival
As If I Am Not There	Juanita Wilson			
Cirkus Columbia	Danis Tanović			
The Abandoned	Adis Bakrač	Mira Furlan, Tony Grga	Drama	Entered into the Karlovy Vary International Film Festival, Santa Barbara International Film Festival, Hollywood Film Festival; Golden Arena for Best Actor in a Leading Role (Tony Grga) at the 2010 Pula Film Festival
2011
A Cell Phone Movie	Nedžad Begović			
2012
Children of Sarajevo	Marija Pikić	Ismir Gagula, Bojan Navojec	Drama	
2013
U potrazi za porodicom	Ognjen Oggi Tomić		Documentary	Part of Al Jazeera Balkans series Oni pobjeđuju
An Episode in the Life of an Iron Picker	Danis Tanović	Nazif Mujić	Drama	Entered into the 63rd Berlin International Film Festival; Jury Grand Prix (Silver Bear) Danis Tanović; Silver Bear for Best Actor Nazif Mujić
2014
Bridges of Sarajevo	Aida Begić, Leonardo Di Constanzo, Jean-Luc Godard, Kamen Kalev, Isild Le Besco, Sergei Loznitsa, Vincenzo Marra, Ursula Meier, Vladimir Perišić, Cristi Puiu, Marc Recha, Angela Schanelec, Teresa Villaverde		Documentary	
2016
Death in Sarajevo	Danis Tanović	Snežana Marković, Izudin Bajrović, Vedrana Seksan, Muhamed Hadžović, Jacques Weber, Aleksandar Seksan	Drama	Entered into the 66th Berlin International Film Festival; Jury Grand Prix (Silver Bear) Danis Tanović
Scream For Me Sarajevo	Tarik Hodžić		Documentary	Highest grossing domestic film in Bosnia and Herzegovina in the year 2018.
2017
Men Don't Cry	Alen Drljević	Boris Isaković, Leon Lučev, Emir Hadžihafizbegović, Ermin Bravo, Ivo Gregurević, Sebastian Cavazza, Izudin Bajrović	Drama	
The Frog	Elmir Jukić	Emir Hadžihafizbegović, Aleksandar Seksan, Mirsad Tuka	Drama	
2019
The Son	Ines Tanović	Dino Bajrović, Snežana Bogdanović, Uliks Fehmiu, Emir Hadžihafizbegović	Drama	

== 2020s ==
Title	Director	Cast	Genre	Notes
2020
Quo Vadis, Aida?	Jasmila Žbanić	Jasna Đuričić, Izudin Bajrović, Boris Isaković	War drama	Entered into the 77th Venice International Film Festival, nominated for Best Film Not in the English Language and for Best Director at the 74th British Academy Film Awards, nominated for Best International Feature Film at the 93rd Academy Awards, Best Film, Best Director and Best Actress Award at the 34th European Film Awards
2021
The White Fortress	Igor Drljaca	Pavle Čemerikić, Sumeja Dardagan	Drama	
Not So Friendly Neighborhood Affair	Danis Tanović	Branko Đurić, Izudin Bajrović	Comedy	
2023
Bosnian Pot	Pavo Marinković	Senad Bašić, Bruna Bebić, Andreas Kiendl, Birgit Stöger, Admir Glamočak, Zlatko Burić	Comedy-drama	
Excursion	Una Gunjak	Asja Zara Lagumdžija, Nađa Spaho, Maja Izetbegović, Mediha Musliović, Izudin Bajrović, Muhamed Hadžović, Vedran Tuce	Drama	
2024
When Santa Was a Communist	Emir Kapetanović	Mirvad Kurić, Zana Marjanović, Miraj Grbić, Mirza Tanović, Kristin Winters	Black comedy	
My Late Summer	Danis Tanović	Anja Matković, Uliks Fehmiu, Goran Navojec	Comedy-drama	
2025
The Pavilion	Dino Mustafić	Rade Šerbedžija, Ksenija Pajić, Mirjana Karanović	Black comedy	It opened the 31st Sarajevo Film Festival

== See also ==
- List of cinema of the world
- Bosnian-Herzegovinian Film Festival
- Sarajevo Film Festival
