= Bosnian-Herzegovinian Film Festival =

- 2013 logo
- Location: New York City, United States
- Founded: 2003
- Directors: Academy of Bosnia and Herzegovina
- Language: International
- Website: www.bhffnyc.org

The Bosnian-Herzegovinian Film Festival (BHFF; Bosnian: Bosanskohercegovački filmski festival) is an annual event founded in 2003 and held in New York. This Festival showcases Bosnian cinematography and also provides a platform for the international exposure for emerging Bosnian filmmakers. In addition to showcasing the Bosnian production films the festival also includes in their program films by other producers and directors that deal with historical, socio-political and cultural issues of Bosnia and Herzegovina.

Bosnian-Herzegovinian Film Festival is organized by not-for-profit organization the Academy of Bosnia and Herzegovina Inc.

== History ==
The idea for organizing the Bosnian-Herzegovinian Film Festival was first conceived in 2002 among film enthusiasts from the Bosnian-Herzegovinian diaspora in San Francisco and New York City. The late Benjamin Filipović, film director, professor at the Academy of Performing Arts in Sarajevo and president of the Association of Filmmakers of Bosnia and Herzegovina, provided the inspiration for the first film festival.

In 2003, the first edition of the BHFF was held at the Two Boots Pioneer Theatre (the opening screening was the multiple award-winning film Remake directed by Dino Mustafić and written by Zlatko Topčić). The following year, BHFF moved to larger premises at the Anthology Film Archives, known as an international center for the preservation, study, and exhibition of film and video. In 2007, BHFF relocated to Tribeca Cinemas. In 2018, the festival takes place in two theaters SVA Theatre as the main and Anthology Film Archives as the adjunct venue.

== Awards ==
BHFF is a competition based film festival and it awards The Golden Apple award in several categories to eligible films screened at each BHFF. Since 2006, BHFF has awarded 39 Golden Apples to some of the most outstanding films of the Bosnian film industry or dealing with Bosnia and Herzegovina in their themes. The winning films have been selected from more than 180 films screened at BHFF over the course of 14 years. They have also passed a difficult and rigorous selection process which to date includes a pool of some 400 film titles entered for BHFF screening consideration.

The Golden Apple is given to the most outstanding films screened at the BHFF in two categories of awards, the BHFF Audience Award and BHFF Jury Awards

=== Jury Awards ===
Since 2012, BHFF awards BHFF Jury Awards to the most outstanding films screened at the BHFF and selected by jury members as most outstanding in its categories. Members of the BHFF Jury are accomplished and recognized members from Bosnian and American cultural, film and art community who have significantly contributed to the Bosnian-Herzegovinian film industry and culture in general.

BHFF jury awards following honors to the most outstanding films:

BHFF Jury Award for Best Documentary Film BHFF Jury Award for Best Short or Animated Narrative Film BHFF Jury Award for Best Feature Narrative Film BHFF Jury Award for Best Acting Performance BHFF Jury Special Mention

BHFF awards following Jury awards:

- BHFF Jury Award for Best Documentary Film
  - 2012 A Cell Phone Movie - Nedžad Begović
  - 2013 Zizi - Nedžad Begović
  - 2014 Finding Family - Chris Leslie and Oggi Tomic
  - 2015 Pretty Village - Dave Evans
  - 2016 I Can Speak - Mirza Skenderagić
  - 2017 No Smoking in Sarajevo - Gianluca Loffredo
  - 2018 To Be Far - Samira Kameli and Sajra Subašić
- BHFF Jury Award for Best Short Film
  - 2012 Short for Vernesa B - Jons Vukorep
  - 2013 Baggage - Danis Tanović
  - 2014 Mum - Ado Hasanović
  - 2015 Chicken - Una Gunjak
  - 2016 Damaged Goods - Nermin Hamzić
  - 2017 Refugee 532 - Goran Kapetanović
  - 2018 Great Wall of China - Aleksandra Odic
- BHFF Jury Award for Best Feature Film
  - 2012 Cirkus Columbia - Danis Tanović
  - 2013 Halima's Path - Arsen Anton Ostojić
  - 2014 An Episode in the Life of an Iron Picker - Danis Tanović
  - 2015 The Bridges of Sarajevo - multiple directors
  - 2016 Tigers - Danis Tanović
  - 2017 A Good Wife - Mirjana Karanović
  - 2018 The Frog - Elmir Jukić
- Honorable Mentions
  - 2012 The Fuse: or How I Burned Simon Bolivar - Igor Drljaca
  - 2016 Our Everyday Life - Ines Tanovic
- BHFF Jury Award for Best Acting Performance
  - 2017 Mirjana Karanović - A Good Wife
  - 2018 Emir Hadžihafizbegović - The Frog

=== Audience Awards ===
BHFF Audience Awards were first introduced at BHFF in 2006. For 6 years, BHFF nominated films for the BHFF Audience Awards in Documentary, Short or Feature Film categories. In 2012, BHFF unified these awards into a single award given to a film voted by audience members as the most outstanding in all categories as BHFF Audience Award for Best Picture

- Best Feature Film
  - 2011 - Belvedere' - Ahmed Imamović
  - 2010 - Storm - Hans-Christian Schmid
  - 2009 - AgapE - Slobodan Maksimović
  - 2008 - The Rhythm of Life - Enver Puška
  - 2007 - Grbavica - Jasmila Žbanić
  - 2006 - Go West - Ahmed Imamović
- Best Documentary Film
  - 2011 - Much Ado in Mostar - Steve Nemsick
  - 2010 - Sevdah - Marina Andree
  - 2009 - Diagnosis S.B.H. - Enes Zlatar
  - 2008 - Enter the Dragon - Ozren Milharcić
  - 2007 - Carnival - Alen Drljević
  - 2006 - I See You My Friend - Ćazim Dervišević

Since 2012 and after introduction of jury awards BHFF consolidated the audience award into a single award

- BHFF Audience Award for Best Picture
  - 2012 - Cirkus Columbia - Danis Tanović
  - 2013 - Halima's Path - Arsen Anton Ostojić
  - 2014 - Finding Family - Chris Leslie and Oggi Tomić
  - 2015 - Racket - Admir Buljugić
  - 2016 - Our Everyday Life - Ines Tanović
  - 2017 - Death in Sarajevo - Danis Tanović
  - 2018 - Men Don't Cry - Alen Drljević

== Noteworthy guests and participants ==
- Zlatko Topčić
- Armand Assante
- Aleksandar Hemon
- Benjamin Filipović
- Ines Tanović
- Ron Haviv
- Danis Tanović
- Mirjana Karanović
- Alen Drljevic
- Emir Hadžihafizbegović
- Ademir Kenović
- Aida Begić
