= Ivica Matić Award =

Film award in Bosnia and Herzegovina

The Ivica Matić Award is an award given by the Association of Film Workers of Bosnia and Herzegovina named after the Bosnian-Herzegovinian film director and screenwriter Ivica Matić.

== History ==
Until 1992, The Ivica Matić Award was given for contributions to film, but was interrupted because of the Bosnian War. It was re-established in 2003 and is awarded to members of the Association in two distinct categories of: Outstanding film work of the year and for the Total contribution to Bosnian-Herzegovinian cinema. The prize is awarded annually as a part of Sarajevo Film Festival program and is supported by Film Fund Sarajevo. Due to the COVID-19 pandemic awards for 2019 and 2020 were awarded in 2021.

== Recent winners ==
The recent winners of the Ivica Matić Award are:

- 2003 – director Pjer Žalica for the film Fuse;
- 2004 – director Srđan Vuletić for the film Summer in the Golden Valley;
- 2005 – film worker Mensud Arslanović, awarded posthumously for his life's contribution;
- 2006 – director Jasmila Žbanić for the film Grbavica and Gavrilo Grahovac, Minister of the Federal Ministry of Culture and Sports for lifelong contribution;
- 2007 – directors Gojko Šipovac and Vlatko Filipović for their lifelong contribution;
- 2008 – director Aida Begić and producer and screenwriter Elma Tataragić for the film Snow;
- 2009/2010 – director Vefik Hadžismajlović and film worker Aziz Arnautović for their overall contribution.
- 2011 – Srđan Šarenac, director of the documentary Village Without Women, and Pero Burić for his life contribution.
- 2012 – Vera Mihić for her life contribution to Bosnian film and the author team of the film Children (Erol Zubčević, Igor Čamo, Sanja Džeba, Sanda Popovac and Miralem Zubčević)
- 2013 – Mustafa Mustafić for his life contribution to Bosnian-Herzegovinian film and Danis Tanović for the film An Episode in the Life of an Iron Picker.
- 2014 – Mirsad Purivatra, director of the Sarajevo Film Festival, and producer Zoran Galić for overall contribution.
- 2015 – Ademir Kenović, producer and director; producer Amra Bakšić Čamo and director of photography Erol Zubčević.
- 2016 – Reginald Šimek, editor, Tomislav Topić, director of the Mediterranean Film Festival, and members of the action group for copyright (Jovan Marjanović, Elma Tataragić, Pierre Žalica, Amar Nović)
- 2017 – Director Alen Drljević and producer Damir Ibrahimović for the film Men Don't Cry, Dragutin Ressner and Nidžara Mehić for their life contribution.
- 2018 – Project "Sarajevo City of Film", and director Vesko Kadić and director of photography Milenko Uherka for his life contribution.
- 2019 – Elma Tataragić for the screenwriting of Stiches by Miroslav Terzić (West End Productions) and God Exists, Her Name is Petrunya by Teona Strugar Mitevska (Sisters and Brother Mitevski); Nermin Hamzagić – director of Full Moon (SCCA/pro.ba) and for overall contribution: director, scriptwriter, cinematographer and producer Mustafa Kapidžić.
- 2020 – Damir Ibrahimović for the realization of Jasmila Žbanić's film Quo Vadis, Aida? (Deblokada), Igor Čamo – sound designer of Quo Vadis, Aida? and Focus, Grandma! by Pierre Žalica (Obala Art Centar) and for overall contribution: Director Ratko Orozović and cinematographer Danijal Šukalo.
- 2021
  - Award for best film: The White Fortress Tabija directed by Igor Drljaca
  - Award for overall contribution to Bosnian and Herzegovinan film: Nedžad Begović
- 2022
  - The award for overall contribution to Bosnian and Herzegovinian film: Predrag Doder
  - Elma Tataragić, screenwriter of the film The Happiest Man in the World
  - Amra Bakšić Čamo and Adis Đapo, co-producers of the film The Happiest Man in the World
- 2023
  - Una Gunjak, director of the film Excursion Ekskurzija
  - The award for overall contribution to Bosnian and Herzegovinian films: Šemsudin Gegić
- 2025
  - Ishak Jalimam, Producer of the films The Sky Above Zenica and Gym
  - The award for overall contribution to Bosnian and Herzegovinian film: Zijad Mehić
