= List of Bosnian submissions for the Academy Award for Best International Feature Film =

Best International Feature Film submissions from Bosnia and Herzegovina

Highlights
- Debut: 1994
- Submissions: 26
- Nominations: 2
- Oscar winners: 1

Bosnia and Herzegovina has submitted films for the Academy Award for Best International Feature Film (Note: The category was previously named the Academy Award for Best Foreign Language Film, but this was changed to the Academy Award for Best International Feature Film in April 2019, after the Academy deemed the word "Foreign" to be outdated.) since 1994. The award is handed out annually by the United States Academy of Motion Picture Arts and Sciences to a feature-length motion picture produced outside the United States that contains primarily non-English dialogue.

As of 2026, Bosnia and Herzegovina has been nominated twice, winning once for No Man's Land (2001).

== Submissions ==
The Academy of Motion Picture Arts and Sciences has invited the film industries of various countries to submit their best film for the Academy Award for Best International Feature Film since 1956. The International Feature Film Committee oversees the process and reviews all the submitted films. Following this, they vote via secret ballot to determine the five nominees for the award.

Most Bosnian submissions have been films about life in the country after the Bosnian War of the 1990s. Black comedies Fuse (2003) and Night Guards (2009), and dramas Days and Hours (2004), Grbavica (2006), It's Hard to Be Nice (2007), and Snow (2008), were all stories about life after the war. While The Awkward Age (1994), was produced during the war, and tells the story of a Communist-era boarding school. Many Bosnian actors and filmmakers worked on films submitted by Yugoslavia prior to the breakup of the country in 1991.

No Man's Land (2001), directed by Danis Tanović, was the country's first nomination and first win. Quo Vadis, Aida? (2020), directed by Jasmila Žbanić, was nominated twenty years later.

An Episode in the Life of an Iron Picker (2013) advanced to the December shortlists, but it was not nominated.

Most of the films submitted are primarily in Bosnian. Below is a list of the films that have been submitted by Bosnia and Herzegovina for review by the Academy for the award by year and the respective Academy Awards ceremony.

Year (Ceremony)	Film title used in nomination	Original title	Language(s)	Director(s)	Result
1994 (67th)	The Awkward Age	Magareće godine	Bosnian, Serbo-Croatian	Nenad Dizdarević	Not nominated
2001 (74th)	No Man's Land	Ničija zemlja	Bosnian, Serbo-Croatian, English, French, German	Danis Tanović	Won Academy Award
2003 (76th)	Fuse	Gori vatra	Bosnian, Serbian, English	Pjer Žalica	Not nominated
2004 (77th)	Days and Hours	Kod amidže Idriza	Bosnian	Pjer Žalica	Not nominated
2005 (78th)	Totally Personal	Sasvim lično	Serbian, English, Bosnian	Nedžad Begović	Not nominated
2006 (79th)	Grbavica: The Land of My Dreams	Grbavica	Bosnian	Jasmila Žbanić	Not nominated
2007 (80th)	It's Hard to Be Nice	Teško je biti fin	Bosnian	Srđan Vuletić	Not nominated
2008 (81st)	Snow	Snijeg	Bosnian	Aida Begić	Not nominated
2009 (82nd)	Night Guards	Čuvari noći	Bosnian	Namik Kabil	Not nominated
2010 (83rd)	Cirkus Columbia		Bosnian, English	Danis Tanović	Not nominated
2011 (84th)	Belvedere		Bosnian	Ahmed Imamović	Not nominated
2012 (85th)	Children of Sarajevo	Djeca	Bosnian	Aida Begić	Not nominated
2013 (86th)	An Episode in the Life of an Iron Picker	Epizoda u životu berača željeza	Bosnian, Romani	Danis Tanović	Made shortlist
2014 (87th)	With Mum	Sa mamom	Bosnian	Faruk Lončarević	Not nominated
2015 (88th)	Our Everyday Life	Naša svakodnevna priča	Bosnian	Ines Tanović	Not nominated
2016 (89th)	Death in Sarajevo	Smrt u Sarajevu	Bosnian, French	Danis Tanović	Not nominated
2017 (90th)	Men Don't Cry	Muškarci ne plaču	Bosnian	Alen Drljević	Not nominated
2018 (91st)	Never Leave Me	Ne ostavljaj me	Arabic, Turkish	Aida Begić	Not nominated
2019 (92nd)	The Son	Sin	Bosnian	Ines Tanović	Not nominated
2020 (93rd)	Quo Vadis, Aida?		Bosnian, Dutch, English, Serbian	Jasmila Žbanić	Nominated
2021 (94th)	The White Fortress	Tabija	Bosnian, English	Igor Drljaca	Not nominated
2022 (95th)	A Ballad	Balada	Bosnian	Aida Begić	Not nominated
2023 (96th)	Excursion	Ekskurzija	Bosnian	Una Gunjak	Not nominated
2024 (97th)	My Late Summer	Nakon ljeta	Croatian, Bosnian	Danis Tanović	Not nominated
2025 (98th)	Blum: Masters of Their Own Destiny	Blum – Gospodari svoje budućnosti	Bosnian, English, German	Jasmila Žbanić	Not nominated
2026 (99th)	The Widower	Udovac	Bosnian	Hari Šečić	Pending

== See also ==
- List of Yugoslav submissions for the Academy Award for Best International Feature Film
- List of Academy Award winners and nominees for Best International Feature Film
- List of Academy Award–winning foreign-language films
