= Reykjavík International Film Festival =

Annual international film festival in Iceland

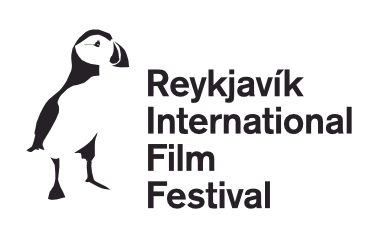
- Location: Reykjavík, Iceland
- Founded: 2004
- Most recent: 2025
- Festival date: Opening: 24 September 2026; Closing: 4 October 2026
- Language: International
- Website: riff.is

Current: 22nd
- 23rd 21st

Reykjavík International Film Festival (RIFF; Icelandic: Alþjóðleg kvikmyndahátíð í Reykjavík [ˈalˌθjouːðˌlɛːɣ ˈkʰvɪːkˌmɪntaˌhauːˌtʰiːð i ˈreiːcaˌviːk]) is an international film festival held annually in Reykjavík, Iceland. The festival lasts 11 days each year and emphasizes young talents. One way of doing so is having a competitive category (named New Visions) exclusively limited to a director's first or second feature-length film. At each festival, a number of awards are given out. The main award is the Discovery of the Year award, also called Golden Puffin, given by an international jury. The international federation of film critics FIPRESCI send a jury to RIFF from 2006. Also, the audience can vote for their favorite film from the whole programme. Lifetime achievement awards and creative excellence awards are given to well-known film directors who have achieved excellence in their work.

== History ==
=== 2004–2009 ===
Reykjavík International Film Festival (RIFF) was founded in 2004 by a group of film enthusiasts and professionals with the goal of creating an annual international film festival in Reykjavík. The aim was to establish a major film event to enrich and enliven the local film culture, but moreover, to become an international attraction.

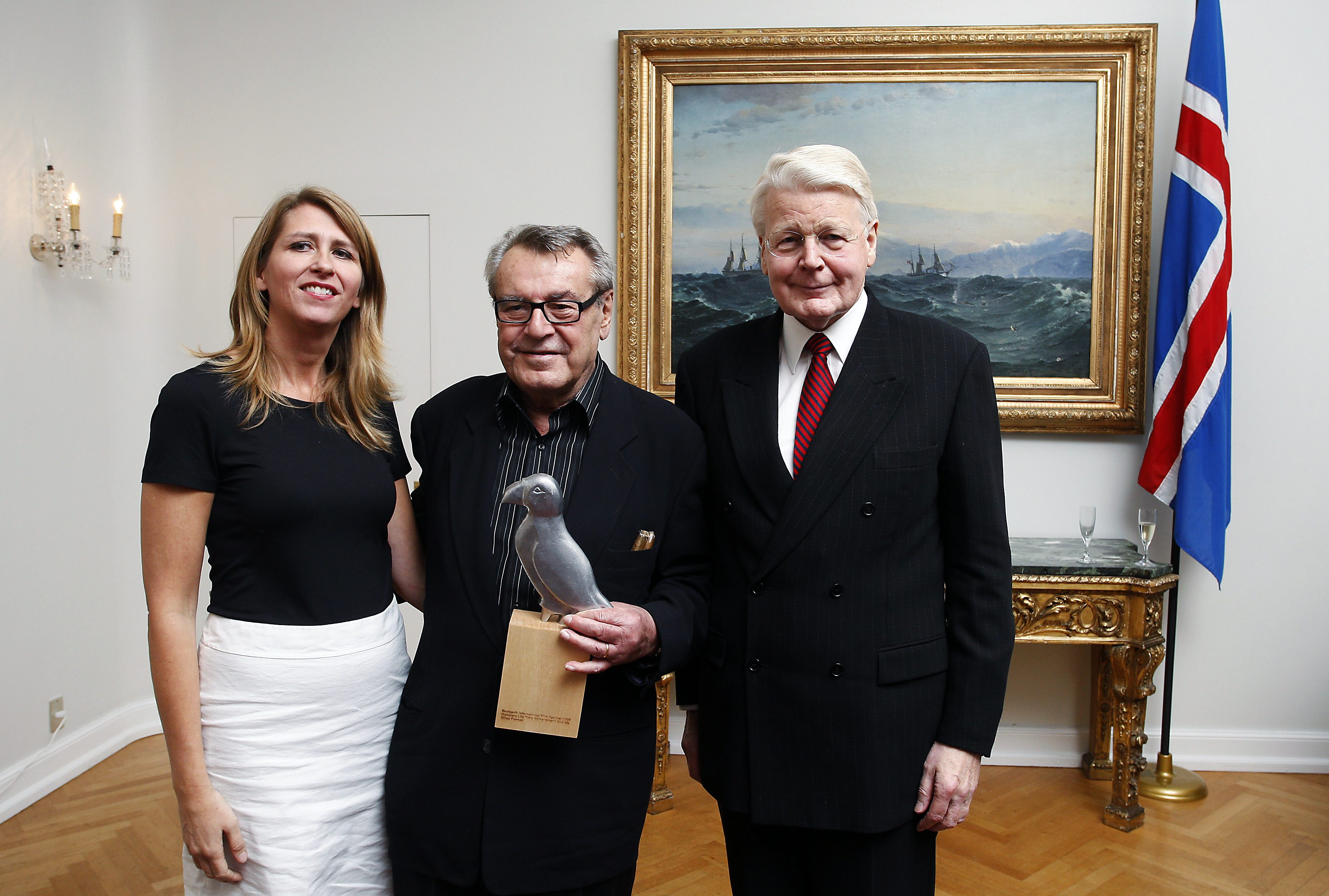
Forman was given an award for his lifetime achievement by the president of Iceland in 2009.

The festival organized its first event in Reykjavík in November 2004, initiating a discussion of the role and importance of film festivals in a local and international context. A festival program was organized in relation to the seminar, showing films by Icelandic film directors and professionals that work outside of Iceland.

The next RIFF was held from September 29 to October 9, 2005, and was a leap forward in size and scale compared to the year before. Programmer Dimitri Eipides was brought on board to supervise the film selection, and he has worked with us since. Eipides had gained experience as a programmer for the Toronto and Montreal Film Festivals as well as the Thessaloniki International Film Festival in Greece.

In 2005, the foundation for the programme for the future was laid and a number of current categories surfaced for the first time. A Lifetime Achievement Award was given to Abbas Kiarostami and a retrospective of his works was screened along with an exhibition of his photographs. A Discovery of the Year award was given out for the first time to Cristi Puiu, director of the film The Death of Mr. Lazarescu. Over 13,000 people came to see the festival's seventy films.

In 2006, RIFF's reputation had spread considerably, and the number of international guests multiplied. Representatives from media such as Variety, The Guardian and IndieWIRE attended the festival. The programme had also grown to incorporate over one hundred films, a number of master classes, symposiums and panel discussions – and even managed to cram a few concerts in too.

Grbavica by Jasmila Žbanić was the 'Discovery of the Year' and RIFF's first time FIPRESCI jury awarded Red Road by Andrea Arnold. Aleksandr Sokurov was given the lifetime achievement award and Atom Egoyan accepted recognition for his creative excellence.

In 2007, RIFF was held for the fourth time. Many filmmakers from all over the world visited Reykjavík for the festival. Among them was Aki Kaurismäki, who received the Reykjavík International Film Festival honorary awards, presented by the president of Iceland, Ólafur Ragnar Grímsson. Hungarian film Iska's Journey by director Csaba Bollók was named Discovery of the Year. Iska's Journey received the Golden Puffin, awarded for the first time. Head of jury Hal Hartley gave out the award.

Peter Greenaway visited Reykjavík, held a lecture and was awarded for his life achievement as a filmmaker. An international federation of film critics, FIPRESCI, awarded Danish debut feature The Art of Crying by Peter Schønau Fog, which also received the Church of Iceland award, given out for the second time. "The film deals delicately with issues that often are kept quiet and presents them with respect, understanding and sympathy. The Art of Crying raises awareness of the fragility of life, moves the audience and calls for discussion and responses," is stated in the jury's motivation. The audience award went to Joy Division's Ian Curtis biopic Control by Anton Corbijn and Amnesty International awarded El Ejido for The Law of Profit – a documentary on immigrants in South Spain.

RIFF 2007 drew over 20,000 people (approx. 7% of Iceland's population) to the festival's screenings and filled 84% of available seats during the festival's eleven days.

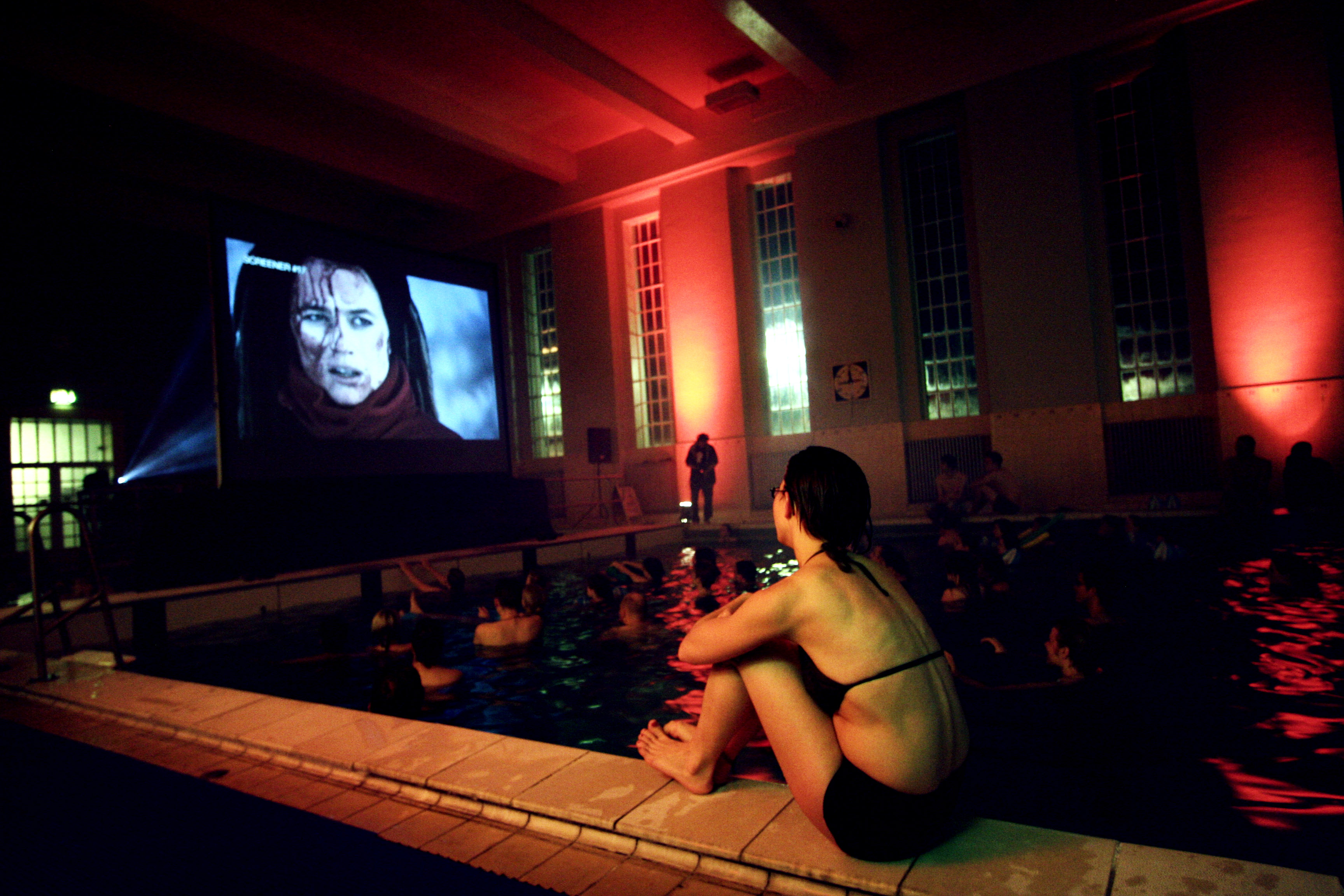
A screening was held in a swimming pool in 2009.

In 2008, RIFF was held for the fifth time. Over 300 foreign guests visited the festival and well over 20,000 people saw the films that RIFF had to offer. The movie Tulpan received the Golden Puffin, RIFF's main award, and was named Discovery of the Year. Home by Ursula Meier received the FIPRESCI award and Snijeg by Aida Begić from Bosnia-Herzegovenia received the Church of Iceland award. Venkovský ucitel by Bohdan Sláma from the Czech Republic received the Gay-friendly award given by Iceland's National Association of Gays and Lesbians. The Association also gave She's a Boy I Knew by Gwen Haworth from Canada a special recognition award. Electronica Reykjavík by Arnar Jónasson from Iceland was voted most popular by the attendees at RIFF.

The special events at RIFF were a success. 'Sound on Sight' was a project where people were able to focus on the special bond and connection between music and film. A project called 'Minus 25' was designed for people under the age of 25 and included many mini projects, e.g., a competition where youngsters wrote music for the movie The Crowd, which was originally released in 1928. A short film competition for young students was held and even Iceland's kindergartens were able to participate in their own little project where children made short films from digital photographs. A talent campus was held where young people from Europe and America were invited to meet in Reykjavík and see what the film industry had to offer on the other side of the globe. This was only a fraction of the special events RIFF had to offer in 2008.

One of the biggest events at the festival and one of the festival's all-over highlights was the visit of 2009's honorary guest - Miloš Forman. Apart from Forman, many international guests came to Reykjavík for the 2009 edition: directors, press and other guests.

=== 2010–2014 ===
In 2010, RIFF was held for the seventh time on September 23 - October 3. In a short time, RIFF became quite well known among film enthusiasts and professionals. Gerald Peary from The Boston Phoenix called the festival "one of the best-programmed film festivals on earth, and with some of the most exciting guests." Todd Burns of Stylus Magazine concluded his article on the 2006 event with these words: "If it continues down this path, it won't be one of the best-kept secrets of the film festival circuit for long," and Brian Brooks from IndieWIRE had this to say: "Quite simply, in my humble opinion as a minor vet on the festival circuit, this event has instantly become one of my favorites. Of course, the lure of Iceland and its eccentric beauty helps, but Reykjavík's residents seem to have embraced the event, filling many of the festival's screenings."

In 2011, the 8th festival took place from September 22 to October 2. In 2011, the selection included films that have already had a lot of press, films that have done well at other festivals but were unlikely to get much attention beyond the festival circuit (Yorgos Lanthimos's Alps, Aleksander Sokurov's Golden Lion-winning Faust) and homegrown films. 'Discovery of the year: the Golden Puffin' was given to Angelina Nikonova for her Twilight Portrait. FIPRESCI awarded Volcano by Rúnar Rúnarsson, who also got The Church of Iceland award. Environment Award winner was Risteard O'Domhnaill for his movie The Pipe. Béla Tarr received a Lifetime Achievement Award and Lone Scherfig got a Creative Excellence Award. The Best Icelandic Short Award was given to Börkur Sigþórsson for Skaði. What is more, in 2011 the festival focused on Romanian films, also had a special "Arabian Spring" programme and the festival audience enjoyed special events like a swim-in cinema, film concert, Bollywood beach party, and the RIFF wonderland.

In 2012, it was held for the 9th time, from September 27 till October 7. Visitors to the festival were able to participate in various special events, like costume screening and party, kindergarten stop-motion screenings, a popular swim-in cinema which became a RIFF's speciality, When the Raven Flies (1984) screening at film director Hrafn Gunnlaugsson's house, screenings of German movies and many other interesting activities. Benh Zeitlin and his film 'Beasts of the Southern Wild' was awarded with a Golden Puffin Award. Dario Argento got the Lifetime Achievement Award and Susanne Bier won in the Creative Excellency category. The most popular film in 2012 was Queen of Montreuil by Sólveig Anspach. International Federation of Film Critics (FIPRESCI) awarded Sean Baker for her film Starlet and the Church of Iceland gave its award for Meni Yaesh and his film God's Neighbours.

In 2013, the festival celebrated its tenth anniversary. RIFF guests and visitors had the opportunity to participate in joke-cinema, midnight movie, cave-cinema, screenings in 'Borg' restaurant, various discussions with film creators, talent lab for youngsters and many other events. Golden Puffin and FIPRESCI Award in 2013 was given for Italian film director Uberto Pasolini and his work called Still Life. The Creative Excellency Award was given to Laurent Cantet, James Gray and Lukas Moodysson, who also got the Audience Award for We Are the Best!. Church of Iceland gave its award to Ritesh Batra for her movie called The Lunchbox.

RIFF returned in 2014 with a larger festival than the previous year. In addition to regular cinema screenings the festival held a drive-in cinema in neighbouring town Kópavogur and a hot tub cinema where audiences got the chance of chatting with short film directors after the screenings of their film. A special focus was on Italian filmmaking this year. Smetto quando voglio by director Sidney Sibilia won the Golden Puffin and Bota by Iris Elezi and Thomas Logoreci won both the Audience and FIBRESCI awards. Mike Leigh was given a Lifetime Achievement Award and his latest movie Mr. Turner was screened to a full audience. Ruben Östlund was honored as an emerging master and became somewhat of a sensation in the city during the festival.

A special panel program was dedicated to the theme of war and peace with topics ranging from the Russo-Ukrainian war, screenings of Finnish war movies and a visit from reporter John Pilger. Another special part of the program was a focus on films from Greenland and the Faroese Islands. A part of the program was held in Kópavogur for the first time with one of the highlights being a film concert where metal band Sólstafir performed their musical score to the film Hrafninn flýgur by director Hrafn Gunnlaugsson.

=== 2015–2019 ===
In 2015, a total of 31,500 people attended the festival, which was once again more than ever before. From the opening film, Tale of Tales, through the concerts, swim-in cinema, cave-in cinema, 300 screenings of about 100 films, numerous panel discussions, about 50 Q&As, Masterclasses and finally the closing night's film, first episode of Baltasar Kormákur's Trapped, RIFF ran smoothly. The Iranian film Wednesday, May 9th by director Vahid Jalilvand won Discovery of the Year, and the distinguished FIPRESCI Award was awarded to Krisha by director Trey Edward Shults. Jerry Rothwell's How to Change the World got Environmental Award, and Matthew Heineman's Cartel Land was awarded with Audience Award. This year two shorts were joint winners of The Best Icelandic Short: Jón Ásgeir Karlsson's Heimildarminnd/Docyoumentary and Eva Sigurðardóttir's Regnbogapartý/Rainbow Party. The recipient of The Golden Egg was Canadian directors Harry Cherniak and Dusty Mancinelli for their project Winter Hymns. In 2015 Iceland celebrated the 100 years anniversary of women's right to vote, which was reflected in a special focus on films made by women or with a female point of view in the festival.

In 2016, the thirteenth edition of the festival took place from September 29 to October 10. Its theme was "What Kind of Peace", which was reflected in the themes addressed by the selection of films as well as special events such as a peace talk that accompanied the festival. The Golden Puffin was awarded to "Godless", directed by Bulgarian director Ralitza Petrova. It was part of the "New Visions" category, which features debut or sophomore films by the directors and challenge cinematic conventions. The plot centres on a nurse who traffics ID cards of demented patients and according to this year's jury "the film combines the downbeat suspense of a medicalized crime story with a subtle portrayal of the agony in a post-communist society where redemption is only glimpsed in the sacral world of music." The Danish/Swedish collaboration "The Giant", directed by Johannes Nyholm, received a special mention in the same category.

The film The Islands and the Whales by Mike Day received the Environmental Award, awarded to films competing in the "A Different Tomorrow" category that sheds light on environmental and humanitarian topics. This year's winners in the short film category were "Cubs" by Nanna Kristín Magnúsdóttir as Best Icelandic Short and "Home" by Daniel Mulloy as Best International Short. "Cubs" is about a single father who is planning a sleepover for his daughter and thematises the taboos in father/daughter relationships. The documentary "Mr Gaga" about choreographer Ohad Naharin, directed by Tomer Heymann, received the audience awards and "The Duke", directed by Max Barbakow received this year's Golden Egg. This year's RIFF honorary prizes were awarded to Deepa Mehta and Darren Aronofsky.

In 2017 the fourteenth RIFF festival was held to great reviews. Director Hlynur Pálmason opened the festival with his first feature film Winter Brothers. He would then go on to screen his second film A White, white day at Cannes in 2019. The Golden Puffin award was handed out to the film The Rider by acclaimed director Chloé Zhao. It was Roser Corella's film Grab and Run that won the Environmental award for the category A Different Tomorrow. The Golden Egg was handed out to Charlotte Scott-Wilson's film Hold on. This year's honorary guest included film maker Werner Herzog and director Olivier Assayas.

Sergei Loznitsa opened the fifteenth RIFF festival in 2018 with his film Donbass. The focus of this year's festival were the Baltic countries. Winners included Yann Gonzalez who won the Golden Puffin for his film Knife + Heart, Nathalia Konchalovsky who won the Golden Egg for her film, Vesna and Erick Stoll and Chase Whiteside who won in the category A Different Tomorrow with their film América.

RIFF 2019 ran from 26 September to 6 October. The festival focused on the Arctic countries, among others. Confirmed honorary guests included acclaimed French director Claire Denis. The final day to submit a film was 14 July.

=== 2020 onwards ===
In 2020 the seventeenth RIFF festival edition was hybrid with both limited screenings in cinema and online screenings.

RIFF Industry days is the title of a series of events and talks held during the Reykjavík International Film Festival together with the 1st edition of the Icelandic Market Forum. (IMF)

RIFF Industry days were designed as a tool to create new spaces for the exchange of ideas and to serve as an open gate for the circulation and promotion of the Icelandic film industry. The prime objective of RIFF Industry Days is to encourage meetings, generate debates and establish dialogues, providing the support that makes original ideas last.

IMF is set for Icelandic professionals to showcase their work in progress-WIP to sales agents and other relevant audiovisual professionals and partners, enabling them to respond directly to the priorities of an expanding and ever-changing film industry. Market screenings were also held for those interested, strictly under registration as well as B2B meetings. The IMF aimed to facilitate better mutual knowledge and understanding between important players in the international audiovisual market and to form a basis for joint direction within the Icelandic film industry.

WIP 2020 was curated by Frédéric Boyer, RIFF head of programming and designed & executed by Carolina Salas, RIFF Industry Manager.

RIFF Industry Days allows film professionals to share their thinking, values and markets.

== Talent Lab ==
The Reykjavík International Film Festival’s Talent Lab is an international workshop for up-and-coming filmmakers, first introduced in 2006 as a forum to mentor new talent. Held over several days during the festival, it brings together around 40 emerging directors, writers, and producers from around the world—typically those developing their first feature film. The program includes masterclasses, pitch sessions, panel discussions, and networking events with established industry professionals and peers.

Short films by Talent Lab participants are screened at the festival and compete for the Golden Egg award, presented as encouragement to a promising early-career filmmaker. The program has since become a key component of RIFF and is regarded as an important platform for emerging filmmakers internationally.

== Golden Puffin winners ==
Year	Film	Director	Nationality
2005	The Death of Mr. Lazarescu	Cristi Puiu	Romania
2006	Grbavica	Jasmila Žbanić	Bosnia and Herzegovina
2007	Iska's Journey	Csaba Bollók	Hungary
2008	Tulpan	Sergey Dvortsevoy	Kazakhstan
2009	I Killed My Mother	Xavier Dolan	Canada
2010	Le Quattro Volte	Michelangelo Frammartino	Italy
2011	Twilight Portrait	Angelina Nikonova	Russia
2012	Beasts of the Southern Wild	Benh Zeitlin	United States
2013	Still Life	Uberto Pasolini	United Kingdom, Italy
2014	Smetto quando voglio	Sydney Sibilia	Italy
2015	Wednesday May 9th	Vahid Jalilvand	Iran
2016	Godless	Ralitza Petrova	Bulgaria, Denmark, France
2017	The Rider	Chloé Zhao	United States
2018	Knife+Heart	Yann Gonzalez	France, Mexico, Switzerland
2019	The Orphanage	Shahrbanoo Sadat	Denmark, Afghanistan
2020	This Is Not a Burial, It's A Resurrection	Lemohang Jeremiah Mosese	South Africa, Italy
2021	Moon, 66 Questions	Jacqueline Lentzou	France, Greece
2022	Rodeo	Lola Quivoron	France
2023	Baan	Leonor Teles	Portugal
2024	Super Happy Together	Kohei Igarashi	Japan

== Awards ==
Year	Dates	Discovery of the Year (Golden Puffin)	Lifetime Achievement	Creative Excellence	Audience Award	FIPRESCI Award	Church of Iceland Award	Emerging Master
2004	Nov 17 – Nov 25	N/A	N/A	N/A	N/A	N/A	N/A	N/A
2005	Sept 29 – Oct 9	The Death of Mr. Lazarescu; Cristi Puiu	Abbas Kiarostami	N/A	Howl's Moving Castle; Hayao Miyazaki	N/A	N/A	N/A
2006	Sept 28 – Oct 8	Grbavica, Jasmila Žbanić	Alexander Sokurov	Atom Egoyan	We Shall Overcome; Niels Arden Oplev	Red Road; Andrea Arnold	Four Minutes; Chris Kraus	N/A
2007	Sept 27 – Oct 7	Iska's Journey, Csaba Bollók	Hanna Schygulla	N/A	Control; Anton Corbijn	The Art of Crying; Peter Schønau Fog	The Art of Crying; Peter Schønau Fog	N/A
2008	Sept 25 – Oct 5	Tulpan; Sergey Dvortsevoy	Costa-Gavras	Shirin Neshat	Electronica Reykjavík; Arnar Jónasson	Home; Ursula Meier	Snow; Aida Begic	N/A
2009	Sept 17 – Sept 27	I killed my mother Xavier Dolan	Miloš Forman	N/A	The gentlemen Janus Bragi Jakobsson	The girl Fredrik Edfeldt	Together; Matias Armand Jordal	N/A
2010	Sept 23 – Oct 3	Le quattro volte Michelangelo Frammartino	Jim Jarmusch	N/A	Littlerock; Mike Ott	Le quattro volte Michelangelo Frammartino	Morgen; Marian Crisan	N/A
2011	Sept 22 – Oct 2	Twilight Portrait; Angelina Nikonova	Béla Tarr	Lone Scherfig	Le Havre; Aki Kaurismäki	Volcano; Rúnar Rúnarsson	Volcano; Rúnar Rúnarsson	N/A
2012	Sept 27 – Oct 7	Beasts of the Southern Wild; Benh Zeitlin	Dario Argento	Susanne Bier	Queen of Montreuil; Sólveig Anspach	Starlet; Sean Baker	God's Neighbours; Meni Yaesh	Marjane Satrapi
2013	Sept 26 – Oct 6	Still Life; Umberto Pasolini	N/A	Lukas Moodysson; Laurent Cantet; James Gray	We Are the Best; Lukas Moodysson	Still Life; Umberto Pasolini	Lunchbox; Ritesh Batra	N/A
2014	Sept 25 – Oct 5	Smetto quando voglio Sydney Sibilia	Mike Leigh	N/A	Bota; Iris Elezi; Thomas Logoreci	Bota; Iris Elezi; Thomas Logoreci	Villa Touma; Suha Arraf	Ruben Östlund
2015	Sept 24 – Oct 4	Wednesday 9th May; Vahid Jalilvand	David Cronenberg; Margarethe von Trotta	N/A	Cartel Land; Matthew Heineman	Krisha; Trey Edward Shults	N/A	N/A
2016	Sept 29–Oct 9	Godless; Ralitza Petrova	Deepa Mehta	Darren Aronofsky	N/A	N/A	N/A	N/A
2017	Sept 28–Oct 8	The Rider; Chloé Zhao	Werner Herzog	N/A	N/A	N/A	N/A	Valeska Grisebach
2018	Sept 27–Oct 7	Knife+Heart; Yann Gonzalez	Jonas Mekas	Mads Mikkelsen	N/A	N/A	N/A	N/A

Year	Dates	Discovery of the Year (Golden Puffin)	Icelandic short film	A different tomorrow	International short film	Golden Egg	Best Icelandic student short
2018	Sept 27 – Oct 7	Knife+Heart; Yann Gonzalez	Jörmundur; Maddie O´Hara, Jack Bushell and Alex Herz	América; Erick Stoll; Chase Whiteside	Gulyabani; Gürcan Keltek	Vesna; Nathalia Konchalovsky	N/A
2019	Sept 26 – Oct 9	The Orphanage; Shahrbanoo Sadat	Paperboy; Ninna Pálmadóttir	Midnight traveller Hassan Fazili	Invisible hero Cristéle Alves Meira	Muero por volver Javier Marco	N/A
2020	Sept 24 – Oct 4	This Is Not a Burial, It's a Resurrection; Lemohang Jeremiah Mosese	Yes-People; Gísli Darri Halldórsson	Songs of Repression; Estephan Wagner	Drifting; Hanxiong Bo	N/A	The Life of Bella; Andri Már Enoksson and Anna Knight
