= Cirkus Columbia =

2010 film

- Directed by: Danis Tanović
- Screenplay by: Danis Tanović
- Based on: Cirkus Columbia by Ivica Đikić
- Produced by: Amra Bakšić Ćamo; Marc Baschet; Marion Hänsel; Dunja Klemenc; Čedomir Kolar; Gerhard Meixner; Miroslav Mogorović; Roman Paul; Mirsad Purivatra; Cat Villiers
- Starring: Miki Manojlović; Boris Ler; Mira Furlan; Jelena Stupljanin; Mario Knezović
- Cinematography: Walther Vanden Ende
- Release date: 23 June 2010
- Running time: 113 minutes
- Countries: Bosnia and Herzegovina
- Languages: English; Bosnian

Cirkus Columbia is a 2010 Bosnian drama film starring Miki Manojlović, Mira Furlan, Boris Ler and Jelena Stupljanin. The film is set in the Herzegovina part of Bosnia and Herzegovina in the early 1990s, after the dissolution of Yugoslavia, and slightly before the Yugoslav Wars. It tells an emotional story of a man coming back to his hometown after many years abroad and dealing with his past and current family, using the political dealings of the region as a backdrop. It is based on the novel Cirkus Columbia by well known Bosnian Croat writer Ivica Đikić.

== Cast ==
- Miki Manojlović - Divko Buntić
- Mira Furlan - Lucija
- Boris Ler - Martin Buntić
- Jelena Stupljanin - Azra
- Milan Štrljić - Ranko Ivanda
- Mario Knezović - Pivac
- Svetislav Goncić - Savo
- Ines Fančović - Starica
- Ermin Bravo - Fra Ante Gudelj
- Mirsad Tuka - Dragan
- Slaven Knezović - Miro
- Izudin Bajrović - Major Kostelić

== Reception ==
The film received mixed reviews. Review aggregator Rotten Tomatoes reports that the film has an overall approval rating of 80%, based on 10 reviews, with a weighted average rating of 6.5/10. Deborah Young wrote in The Hollywood Reporter that the film "rings with authenticity and weight", and presents absorbing characters, yet "the script by Tanovic and Ivica Dikic is simple to a fault, becoming utterly predictable in the forbidden romance between Martin and his father's bride-to-be".

== See also ==
- List of submissions to the 83rd Academy Awards for Best Foreign Language Film
- List of Bosnian submissions for the Academy Award for Best Foreign Language Film
