= Milan Pavlović (actor) =

Bosnian actor and TV personality (born 1969)

- Born: 22 December 1969 (age 56); Sarajevo, SR Bosnia and Herzegovina, SFR Yugoslavia
- Education: Academy of Performing Arts in Sarajevo
- Occupation: Actor
- Years active: 2002–Present

Milan Pavlović (born 22 December 1969) is a Bosnian actor and TV personality.

His first television role was in 10 Minutes, a 2002 short film directed by Ahmed Imamović. However, Pavlović is best known for his role of Dino Mehmeda Mujkić in the popular Bosnian sitcom Lud, zbunjen, normalan from 2007 to 2009.

== Filmography ==
=== Film ===
Year	Title	Role	Notes
2002	10 Minutes	Shopkeeper	Short film
2003	Zaboravljena poslovica	Debeli	
2004	Srijedom	Panja	Short film
2005	Go West	Milo	
2006	Nebo iznad krajolika	Ćata	
2006	Sretan put Nedime		Short film
2007	Duhovi Sarajeva	Faruk	
2008	Čuvari noći	Brizla	
2012	Twice Born		
2013	Čefurji raus!	Mirsad	
2017	La Gran Promesa	Almir	

=== Television ===
Year	Title	Role	Notes
2004	Mujo i Haso superstars	Mujo	Series of short films (which typically aired during commercial breaks as a time slot filler)
2004–2006	Crna hronika	Alen	
2005	Sex i selo	Brzi	
2007–2008	Nadreality Show	Various characters	
2007–2009	Lud, zbunjen, normalan	Dino (Mehmeda) Mujkić	Recurring character (73 episodes)
2010	Instruktor	Polaznik "Ćorsokak"	
2017	Nadreality Show 2	Various characters	
