= 10 Minutes (2002 film) =

- Directed by: Ahmed Imamović
- Written by: Srđan Vuletić
- Produced by: Zijad Mehić
- Release date: November 8, 2002 (Thessaloniki)
- Running time: 10 minutes
- Countries: Bosnia and Herzegovina
- Language: Bosnian

10 Minutes is a 2002 short film contrasting ten minutes in the life of a Japanese tourist in Rome with the bloody drama of a Bosnian family taking place at the same time less than an hour away in the besieged city of Sarajevo during the Bosnian War. It was directed by Ahmed Imamović.

== Cast ==
- Elmedin Leleta as Kid (as Almedin Leleta)
- Satoshi Yahata as Tourist
- Milan Pavlović as Shopkeeper
- Jasna Žalica as Mother
- Izudin Bajrović as Father
- Admir Glamočak as Atko
- Enis Bešlagić as Soldier 1
- Elmir Jukić as Soldier 2
- Sanja Burić as Sanja
- Advan Tabaković as Kid playing football

== Awards ==
The film was awarded Best short film of 2002 by the European Film Academy.
