= Blum: Masters of Their Own Destiny =

2024 documentary film by Jasmila Žbanić

- Promotional poster
- Bosnian: Blum - Gospodari svoje buducnosti
- Directed by: Jasmila Žbanić
- Screenplay by: Jasmila Žbanić; Zoran Solomun
- Produced by: Damir Ibrahimović; Jasmila Žbanić
- Starring: Emerik Blum; Raif Dizdarevic
- Cinematography: Eldar Emrić
- Edited by: Vladimir Gojun
- Production company: Deblokada
- Distributed by: Icarus Films
- Release dates: 8 November 2024 (Sarajevo, Bosnia and Herzegovina)
- Running time: 76 minutes
- Countries: Bosnia and Herzegovina
- Languages: Bosnian; English; German

Blum: Masters of Their Own Destiny (Bosnian: Blum - Gospodari svoje buducnosti) is a 2024 Bosnian documentary film written, co-produced and directed by Jasmila Žbanić. The film tells the story of how Emerik Blum, Bosnian Jewish businessman, philanthropist and politician transformed a small studio into a major company Energoinvest using a unique and democratic management style. In this model, every employee had a say in the decisions affecting the business. Though not widely known, it shows how shared decision-making can lead to big success.

The film premiered on 8 November 2024 in Sarajevo. It was selected as the Bosnia and Herzegovina entry for the Best International Feature Film at the 98th Academy Awards, but it was not nominated.

== Production ==
In September 2022, Dok Leipzig announced its Co-Pro Market projects, the documentary featured in the list of 34 projects from 32 countries.

== Release ==
Blum: Masters of Their Own Destiny was screened in Doc Fortnight 2025 at MoMA’s Festival of International Nonfiction Film and Media on 22 February 2025. It was released on 31 March 2025 at 21st ZagrebDox in Croatia. It was screened at the Bosnian-Herzegovinian Film Festival in New York on 26 April 2025 in SVA Theatre.

On 14 July 2025, it was screened at the Pula Film Festival, Croatia.

New York based distribution company Icarus Films acquired the rights of North American Distribution of the film in July 2025.

== Reception ==
In his review for Dokumentarni at ZagrebDox, Janko Heidl awarded the film 4 out of 5 stars, praising its thoughtful structure and emotional depth. He described the film as featuring "rich and exciting archival material, in black and white and in color, well-researched and inspiredly (re)organized," which is interwoven with present-day interviews of former Energoinvest employees, filmed with "beautifully, unobtrusively elegantly" lighting that underscores "the dignity of their work-life path."

Heidl highlighted the film’s poignant conclusion, which portrays the dissolution of Energoinvest during the war and its post-war privatization. He noted that the ending "resonates tragically as if it were a living being," and commended the filmmakers for conveying "the horror of destruction as such, the force of evil that quickly and easily obliterates what has been built for decades."

== See also ==
- List of submissions to the 98th Academy Awards for Best International Feature Film
- List of Bosnian submissions for the Academy Award for Best International Feature Film
