= Luna Mijović =

Bosnian actress (born 1991)

- Born: 2 December 1991 (age 34); Sarajevo, SR Bosnia and Herzegovina, SFR Yugoslavia
- Occupation: Actress
- Years active: 2006-present

Luna Mijović (born 2 December 1991), sometimes credited as Luna Zimić-Mijović is a Bosnian actress. She has appeared in more than ten films since 2006.

Born in Sarajevo to a Serb father Vlastimir Mijović and Bosniak mother Amra (née Zimić), part of Mijović's infancy was spent in Moscow where her journalist father—employed at the time at the state-owned Oslobođenje daily—was stationed as a foreign correspondent.

== Selected filmography ==
Year	Title	Role	Notes
2006	Grbavica	Sara	Bosnian film, winner of Golden Bear
2011	Breathing	Mona	Austrian film
2011	Silent Sonata	Daughter	Slovenian film
2012	Twice Born	Danka	Italian film
2013	Dreamland	Mia	German film
2015	Youth	Masseuse	Italian film, winner of European Film Award for Best Film
2016	Death in Sarajevo	Tajna	Bosnian film, winner of Jury Grand Prix
2020	Quo Vadis, Aida?	Lejla	Bosnian film, Oscar nominee for Best International Feature Film
