= Praznik =

Praznik or Prazdnik means holiday in several Slavic languages and may refer to

- Darren Praznik (born 1961), Canadian politician
- Rok Praznik (born 1980), Slovenian handball player
- Holiday in Sarajevo (Praznik u Sarajevu), a 1991 Bosnia and Herzegovina film
- Praznik za uši, a 2009 album by the Serbian DJ Timbe
