= On the Path =

2010 film

- Film poster
- Directed by: Jasmila Žbanić
- Written by: Jasmila Žbanić
- Produced by: Damir Ibrahimović; Bruno Wagner; Barbara Albert
- Starring: Zrinka Cvitešić; Leon Lučev; Nina Violić; Mirjana Karanović
- Cinematography: Christine A. Maier
- Production company: Coop99 Filmproduktion
- Release dates: 18 February 2010 (Berlinale); 20 February 2010 (Bosnia and Herzegovina)
- Running time: 100 minutes
- Countries: Bosnia and Herzegovina
- Language: Bosnian

On the Path (Bosnian: Na putu) is a 2010 Bosnian drama film written and directed by Jasmila Žbanić. The film was screened in competition at the 60th Berlin International Film Festival. At the 7th Yerevan Golden Apricot International Film Festival the film won the FIPRESCI Prize.

== Plot ==
Luna and Amar are a young Bosniak couple living in Sarajevo. Both have traumatic memories from the Bosnian War of the 1990s. Luna had seen her parents killed by an anti-Muslim militia in Bijeljina, and had come to Sarajevo with her grandparents as a child refugee. Amar had served as a soldier in the war and lost his brother. At present, however, they have apparently built up a successful life - she as an air hostess with B&H Airlines, he as an air traffic controller at the Sarajevo International Airport. When she comes back from a flight they make love passionately and go to have a good time at a local nightclub. Though identifying as "Muslims" in the context of Bosnia's ethnic set-up, religion plays no part in their life. In fact, Amar drinks alcohol a bit too much - which is forbidden by Islam - and it is this which begins to put their relationship under strain.

First of all, Amar loses his job for being drunk at work. Luna is very worried and has little hope of realizing her fragile dream of having a child with Amar. But her fears for their future increase when Amar takes on a well-paid job in a Muslim community hours away from where they live. Only after quite some time has elapsed during which they have had no contact with each other, is Luna allowed to visit Amar in this community of conservative Wahhabis in its idyllic lakeside location. She notices that the men and veiled women live in strict segregation and are closely watched. Luna asks Amar to return home with her but Amar insists that life in this isolated community of faithful followers has brought him peace and also keeps him from drinking. When he returns home a few weeks later, Luna realizes that Amars attitude to religion has fundamentally changed. Amar claims that his only interest is to become a better person, but Luna finds it extremely difficult to follow his line of thinking. She begins to question everything that she has believed in, even her desire to have a child. As the wounds of a tragic war-filled past continue to haunt her, Luna tears herself apart searching if love is truly enough to keep her and Amar together on the path to a lifetime of happiness.

== Cast ==
- Zrinka Cvitešić
- Leon Lučev
- Mirjana Karanović
- Nina Violić
- Jasna Beri
- Jasna Žalica
- Mirvad Kurić
- Sebastian Cavazza
- Marija Kohn
- Izudin Bajrović
- Vanessa Glodjo
- Ermin Bravo
