= I Know Your Soul =

2023 Bosnia and Herzegovina TV series

- Genre: legal drama
- Created by: Jasmila Žbanić
- Written by: Jasmila Žbanić
- Starring: Jasna Đuričić
- Country of origin: Bosnia and Herzegovina
- No. of seasons: 1
- No. of episodes: 6

Production
- Running time: 50 minutes

Original release
- Release: 29 October 2023

I Know Your Soul (Bosnian: Znam kako dišeš, lit. 'I Know How You Breathe') is a 2023 Bosnia and Herzegovina six-episode legal drama limited series created by Jasmila Žbanić.

== Plot ==
Prosecutor Nevena Murtezić is tasked with investigating the case of a young boy's suicide. At the same time, she must confront personal problems that become intertwined with the case.

== Cast ==
- Jasna Đuričić as Nevena Murtezić
- Lazar Dragojević as Dino Murtezić, Nevena's son
- Mirvad Kurić as inspector Džandžanović "Džandžo"
- Kemal Rizvanović as Kemal
- Jelena Kordić Kuret as Violeta
- Ermin Bravo as Haris Murtezić
- Emir Hadžihafizbegović as Goran Halilović
- Selma Alispahić as Vedrana Halilović
- Izudin Bajrović as Halid Kapić

== Production ==
The series had been originally conceived by Jasmila Žbanić as a feature film, but the project was rejected by the Bosnian Film Fund; during the COVID-19 pandemic Žbanić adapted the script into a six-episode television series, with four episodes entirely consisting of new material.

== Release ==
The first two episodes of the series premiered out of competition at the 80th edition of the Venice Film Festival. The series was released in October 2023 by BH Telecom's MY TV platform. It was acquired by HBO Max in November 2023.

== Reception ==
The series was described as "an in-depth exploration of familial bonds and secrets", with "a strong narrative and grounded characters", and which "does a great job in its examination of the tragedies that emerge from society’s deep-rooted inequalities."
