= Stitches (2019 film) =

2019 film

- Directed by: Miroslav Terzić
- Starring: Snežana Bogdanović; Marko Petrić
- Release date: 11 February 2019 (BIFF)
- Running time: 105 minutes
- Country: Serbia
- Language: Serbian

Stitches (Serbian: Šavovi) is a 2019 Serbian drama film directed by Miroslav Terzić. It is based on a true story.

== Cast ==
- Snežana Bogdanović - Ana
- Marko Petrić - Jovan
- Jovana Stojiljković - Ivana
