= For Those Who Can Tell No Tales =

2013 film

- Theatrical release poster
- Directed by: Jasmila Žbanić
- Produced by: Damir Ibrahimović; Jasmila Žbanić
- Starring: Pamela Rabe
- Release dates: 7 September 2013 (TIFF); 1 October 2013 (Bosnia)
- Running time: 72 minutes
- Countries: Bosnia and Herzegovina
- Languages: English; Bosnian; Serbian

For Those Who Can Tell No Tales is a 2013 Bosnian drama film directed by Jasmila Žbanić. It was screened in the Special Presentation section at the 2013 Toronto International Film Festival.

== Cast ==
- Kym Vercoe as Kym Vercoe
- Boris Isaković as Police Inspector
- Simon McBurney as Tim Clancy
- Branko Cvejić as Museum Guide
- Leon Lučev as Veljko
- Jasna Đuričić as Edina
- Pamela Rabe as Mum
- Arky Michael as Arky
