= Belvedere (film) =

- Theatrical release poster
- Directed by: Ahmed Imamović
- Written by: Ahmed Imamović; Aida Pilav
- Produced by: Samir Smajić
- Starring: Sadžida Šetić; Nermin Tulić; Arman Bahador
- Release date: December 2, 2010
- Running time: 90 minutes
- Countries: Bosnia and Herzegovina
- Language: Bosnian

Belvedere is a 2010 Bosnian drama film, directed by Ahmed Imamović. The film was selected as the Bosnian entry for the Best Foreign Language Film at the 84th Academy Awards, but it did not make the final shortlist.

== Cast ==
- Sadžida Šetić - Ruvejda
- Nermin Tulić - Alija
- Minka Muftić - Zejna

== See also ==
- List of submissions to the 84th Academy Awards for Best Foreign Language Film
- List of Bosnian submissions for the Academy Award for Best Foreign Language Film
