= Never Leave Me (film) =

2017 film

- Film poster
- Directed by: Aida Begić
- Written by: Aida Begić
- Produced by: Aida Begić; Adis Djapo; Seyyid Muhammed Emin Elhüseyni
- Starring: Ismail Hakki; Carole Abboud; Motaz Faez Basha; Isa Demlakhi; Feyyaz Duman; Nisreen Faour
- Cinematography: Erol Zubčević
- Edited by: Redzinald Simek
- Music by: Igor Čamo
- Release date: 6 December 2017 (Dubai IFF)
- Running time: 96 minutes
- Countries: Bosnia and Herzegovina
- Languages: Arabic; Turkish
- Box office: $127,668

Never Leave Me (Turkish: Beni Bırakma) is a 2017 Bosnian drama film directed by Aida Begić. It was selected as the Bosnian entry for the Best Foreign Language Film at the 91st Academy Awards, but it was not nominated.

== Cast ==
- Ismail Hakki as Jury
- Carol Abboud as Doaa
- Motaz Faez Basha as Motaz
- Isa Demlakhi as Isa
- Feyyaz Duman as Adil
- Nisreen Faour as Hiba

== See also ==
- List of submissions to the 91st Academy Awards for Best Foreign Language Film
- List of Bosnian submissions for the Academy Award for Best Foreign Language Film
