= Damir Ibrahimović =

Bosnian film producer (1965–2025)

- Born: 18 July 1965; Sarajevo, SR Bosnia and Herzegovina, SFR Yugoslavia
- Died: 9 October 2025 (aged 60); Sarajevo, Bosnia and Herzegovina
- Occupation: Film producer

Damir Ibrahimović (18 July 1965 – 9 October 2025) was a Bosnian film producer.

== Life and career ==
Ibrahimović was born on 18 July 1965 in Sarajevo and graduated from the Faculty of Economy in Sarajevo. He was the director of the Artists' Association "Deblokada" and a producer of feature and short films.

His wife was a Bosnian-Herzegovinian film director, screenwriter and producer Jasmila Žbanić. Damir and Jasmila met in a shelter during the siege of Sarajevo.

== Death ==
Ibrahimović died in Sarajevo on 9 October 2025, at the age of 60.

== Filmography ==
- 2024 – Blum - Gospodari svoje buducnosti
- 2020 – Quo Vadis, Aida?
- 2018 – Dah
- 2017 – Muškarci ne plaču
- 2015 – Jedan dan u Sarajevu
- 2014 – Cure - život druge, Otok ljubavi i Nacrtaj mi jednu zemlju
- 2013 – Za one koji ne mogu da govore
- 2010 – Na putu
- 2007 – Dnevnik graditelja
- 2006 – Grbavica
- 2005 – Izgubljeno nađeno
- 2004 – Slike s ugla
- 2002 – Naprijed, nazad i Sjećaš li se Sarajeva?
- 2001 – Crvene gumene čizme
- 1998 – Ljubav je...
