= Jasna Beri =

Bosnian actress

- Born: 2 January 1954 (age 72); Zenica, PR Bosnia and Herzegovina, FPR Yugoslavia
- Occupation: Actress
- Years active: 1975-present
- Height: 1.6 m (5 ft 3 in)

Jasna Beri (born Jasna Ornela Bery; 2 January 1954) is a Bosnian actress. She appeared in more than forty films since 1975.

== Selected filmography ==
Year	Title	Role	Notes
2004	100 Minutes of Glory	Marcia	
2006	Grbavica	Sabina	
2008	Snow	Nadija	
2012	In the Land of Blood and Honey		
2013	Children of Sarajevo	Salihla	
2015	Our Everyday Life	Marija	
