= Šemsudin Gegić =

Bosnian film director (b. 1951)

Šemsudin Gegić (born in 1951 in Zavidovici, Bosnia and Herzegovina), is Bosnian literate, playwright, theater, television and film director.

== Biography ==
He graduated from the University of Arts/Academy of Dramatic Arts (theatre, film, radio and television) in Belgrade in the former Yugoslavia. He received a year-long specialization in directing in 1995 in Milan (Italy) supported by a fellowship provided by Radio and Television of Bosnia and Herzegovina.

Šemsudin Gegić is the author and director of an additional ten documentary and feature films, writer and director of the first performance of seven original stage plays, author and director of thirty documentary and documentary-feature films for which he won domestic and international plaudits and awards.

== Awards and honors ==
He is a winner of a great number of domestic and international awards for his work in the field of drama and his documentary films:

- 2023 – The Ivica Matić Award for overall contribution to Bosnian and Herzegovinian films.
- Award for the Art in recording "Without Retake" for the best documentary feature "Tracing the Shadows", Bulgaria, 2009
- Maxi man - 2008, in category of Drama Art, Sarajevo, 2008
- Camera veritas for the Best Documentary – “Ambassadors learning languages”, Plovdiv, Bulgaria, 2008
- Golden Art Amphora for the Best Documentary –“A Boy from a War movie”, Sophia, Bulgaria, 2004
- First Special Award Napolidrammaturgiain Festival for the Best Drama “La Dote”, Napoli, Italy, 2002
- Special Award of the International Jury of the VI Sarajevo Film Festival for the “Following the Footprints of Shadows”, Sarajevo, Bosnia and Herzegovina, 2000
- Scena Prima Award for the best play “La Sibilla di Sarajevo”, Lombardia, Italy, 1996
- Annual Award of the BiH Journalist Association for TV documentary enterprise of the year, Sarajevo, Bosnia and Herzegovina, 1992
- Finalist of the three best documentary radio dramas with documentary drama – “Album of a Man of the People”, RTV Festival Prix Italy, Cagliari, Italy, 1985
- Isak Samokovlija Literary Award for the Best Drama “Ruho”, Competition MRZ for the Cultural and Educational Work, Pljevlja, Ex-Yugoslavia, 1984
