= Nazif Mujić =

Bosnian Roma actor (1970–2018)

- Born: 10 November 1970; Tuzla Canton, Bosnia and Herzegovina
- Died: 18 February 2018 (aged 47); Tuzla Canton, Bosnia and Herzegovina
- Occupation: Actor
- Known for: An Episode in the Life of an Iron Picker
- Children: Sandra Mujić, Šemsa Mujić
- Relatives: Suljo Mujić (brother)
- Awards: Silver Bear for Best Actor (2013)

Nazif Mujić (10 November 1970 – 18 February 2018) was a Bosnian Roma actor who is known for his award-winning performance in the documentary drama film An Episode in the Life of an Iron Picker. He acted as a scrap collector in Bosnia and Herzegovina along with his family in the movie.

He was awarded the Silver Bear for Best Actor trophy at the 63rd Berlin International Film Festival in 2013 to his performance as a lead actor, playing the character of himself. In 2014, Nazif also pledged asylum for himself and his family in Berlin from Bosnia and Herzegovina as he was continuously discriminated in Bosnia and Herzegovina due to being a Roma. On 18 February 2018, he died at the age of 47 in Bosnia at his house as the reports claimed his cause of death due to illness and financial crisis prevailed in his family but the real reason wasn't revealed.

== Tragedy ==
Despite his career success as an actor, he was unsuccessful in his personal life and had to sell his Silver Bear Award in order to bear the financial problems which troubled his family. He was forced to sell his award worth €4.000 to feed his children.

After a harrowing descent into extreme poverty, he died as a result of the mental stress when he was 47 years old. The 68th Berlin International Film Festival paid tribute and condolences following his death.
