= Go West (2005 film) =

- Directed by: Ahmed Imamović
- Written by: Ahmed Imamović; Enver Puška
- Produced by: Samir Smajić
- Starring: Mario Drmać; Tarik Filipović
- Cinematography: Mustafa Mustafić
- Edited by: Andrija Zafranović; Mirsad Tabaković
- Music by: Enes Bure Zlatar
- Distributed by: Comprex
- Release date: 2005
- Running time: 97 minutes
- Country: Bosnia and Herzegovina
- Language: Bosnian

Go West is a 2005 Bosnian drama directed by Ahmed Imamović. It tells the story of two gay lovers, one being a Bosniak and the other a Serb, during the Bosnian War. It was developed jointly by two studios, one being in Bosnia and the other in Croatia.

== Plot ==
Kenan (Mario Drmać), a Bosniak classical musician, and Milan (Tarik Filipović), a Serb, live in Sarajevo, Bosnia and Herzegovina in a clandestine gay relationship. When the Bosnian War breaks out in 1992, they try to escape from the city. In order to hide from Serbian militiamen, Kenan disguises himself as a woman and Milan passes him off as his wife. Together, they go to Milan's village in Eastern Bosnia, a Serb stronghold, where they continue to live in deception. However, Milan is soon conscripted into the army and Kenan is left behind in the village. Ranka, a woman from the village, discovers Kenan's secret and seduces him.

== Cast ==
- Tarik Filipović as Milan
- Rade Šerbedžija as Ljubo
- Mirjana Karanović as Ranka
- Mario Drmać as Kenan
- Haris Burina as Lunjo
- Jeanne Moreau as Journalist
- Nermin Tulić as Priest Nemanja
- Almedin Leleta as Alen
- Almir Kurt as Drago
- Milan Pavlović as Milo
- Orijana Kunčić as Posilna
- Miraj Grbić as Serbian soldier

== Reception ==
Go West was nominated for the Grand Prix des Amériques award at the Montréal World Film Festival, 2005. The film also won the audience award for the best film at the 2006 Bosnian-Herzegovinian Film Festival in New York.

The film received the prize for the Best Film at the Madrid Móstoles International Film Festival, 2007.
