= My Late Summer =

2024 Bosnian film

- Theatrical release poster
- Directed by: Danis Tanović
- Written by: Anja Matković; Nikola Kuprešanin; Danis Tanović
- Produced by: Lana Matić; Boris T. Matić; Jelena Mitrović; Miha Černec; Jožko Rutar; Mirsad Purivatra; Jovan Marjanović; Anamaria Antoci
- Starring: Anja Matković; Uliks Fehmiu; Goran Navojec
- Cinematography: Miloš Jaćimović
- Edited by: Redžinald Šimek
- Music by: Mirza Tahirović
- Production companies: Propeler Film; Tramal Films; Obala Art Centar; Baš Čelik; Tangaj Production
- Release date: 16 August 2024 (Sarajevo)
- Running time: 98 minutes
- Countries: Bosnia and Herzegovina; Croatia; Romania; Serbia; Slovenia
- Languages: Croatian; Bosnian

My Late Summer (Bosnian: Nakon ljeta) is a 2024 internationally co-produced comedy-drama film directed by Danis Tanović and written by Anja Matković, Nikola Kuprešanin and Tanović. The plot follows a family fighting for inheritance on a small island.

An international co-production, the film premiered at the 30th Sarajevo Film Festival on 16 August 2024. It was selected as the Bosnian entry for the Best International Feature Film at the 97th Academy Awards, but was not nominated.

== Plot ==
A young woman from Zagreb, the illegitimate daughter of a rich islander, comes to the island where she begins an affair with a married British writer in a midlife crisis. Their sea adventure becomes a forbidden love, a search for identity, intertwined with family values, a tragicomic house renovation and a herd of cows that consumed intoxicants.

== Cast ==
- Anja Matković as Maja
- Uliks Fehmiu as Saša
- Goran Navojec as Ico
- Mario Knezović as Nediljko
- Marija Škaričić as lawyer Matković
- Mirela Brekalo as widow Stipetić
- Snježana Sinovčić-Šiškov as Jele
- Luka Juričić as Mate
- Boris Ler as Brzi
- Ivana Roščić as Katarina
- Jadranka Matković as Ane
- Almir Palata as Andrija

== Production ==
=== Development ===
The film was supported by HAVC, the Slovenian Film Center, the Serbian Film Center, the Sarajevo Cinematography Foundation, the Romanian Film Center, BH Telecom and the MEDIA sub-programme of Creative Europe. Post-production started in 2022, and the film received a boost from HAVC with funds of €660,000.

=== Filming ===
Filming lasted 27 days from mid-September to 10 October 2023 near Šibenik, Croatia.

== See also ==
- List of submissions to the 97th Academy Awards for Best International Feature Film
- List of Bosnian submissions for the Academy Award for Best International Feature Film
