= The Son (2019 Bosnia and Herzegovina film) =

2019 film

- Film poster
- Directed by: Ines Tanović
- Starring: Dino Bajrović; Snežana Bogdanović; Uliks Fehmiu; Emir Hadžihafizbegović
- Release date: 16 August 2019 (Sarajevo)
- Running time: 96 minutes
- Countries: Bosnia and Herzegovina
- Language: Bosnian

The Son (Bosnian: Sin) is a 2019 Bosnian drama film directed by Ines Tanović. It was selected as the Bosnian entry for the Best International Feature Film at the 92nd Academy Awards, but it was not nominated.

== Plot ==
Adopted 18-year-old Arman's struggles with his identity affect his younger stepbrother Dado, which leads Dado into drug addiction.

== Cast ==
- Dino Bajrović as Arman
- Snežana Bogdanović
- Uliks Fehmiu
- Emir Hadžihafizbegović

== See also ==
- List of submissions to the 92nd Academy Awards for Best International Feature Film
- List of Bosnian submissions for the Academy Award for Best International Feature Film
