= Totally Personal =

2005 film

- Directed by: Nedžad Begović
- Written by: Nedžad Begović
- Release date: 24 April 2005 (Tribeca)
- Running time: 72 minutes
- Countries: Bosnia and Herzegovina
- Language: Bosnian

Totally Personal (Serbo-Croatian: Sasvim lično) is a 2005 Bosnian documentary film directed by Nedžad Begović. It was selected as the Bosnian entry for the Best Foreign Language Film at the 78th Academy Awards, but it was not nominated.

== Cast ==
- Naida Begović as Self
- Nedžad Begović as Self
- Sabrina Begović-Ćorić as Self

== See also ==
- List of submissions to the 78th Academy Awards for Best Foreign Language Film
- List of Bosnian submissions for the Academy Award for Best International Feature Film
