= Children of Sarajevo =

2012 film

- Film poster
- Bosnian: Djeca
- Literally: Children
- Directed by: Aida Begić
- Written by: Aida Begić
- Produced by: Aida Begić
- Starring: Marija Pikić
- Cinematography: Erol Zubčević
- Edited by: Miralem Zubčević
- Release date: 23 May 2012 (Cannes)
- Running time: 90 minutes
- Countries: Bosnia and Herzegovina; Germany; France; Turkey
- Language: Bosnian

Children of Sarajevo (Bosnian: Djeca, lit. 'Children') is a 2012 Bosnian drama film directed by Aida Begić. The film competed in the Un Certain Regard section at the 2012 Cannes Film Festival where it won the Special Distinction award. The film was selected as the Bosnian entry for the Best Foreign Language Oscar at the 85th Academy Awards, but it did not make the final shortlist.

== Cast ==
- Marija Pikić as Rahima
- Ismir Gagula as Nedim
- Bojan Navojec as Davor
- Sanela Pepeljak as Vedrana
- Vedran Đekić as Čiza
- Mario Knezović as Dino
- Jasna Beri as Saliha
- Nikola Đuričko as Tarik
- Staša Dukić as Selma
- Aleksandar Seksan as Rizo
- Velibor Topić as Mirsad Melić

== See also ==
- List of submissions to the 85th Academy Awards for Best Foreign Language Film
- List of Bosnian submissions for the Academy Award for Best Foreign Language Film
