= Goran Navojec =

Croatian actor and musician (born 1970)

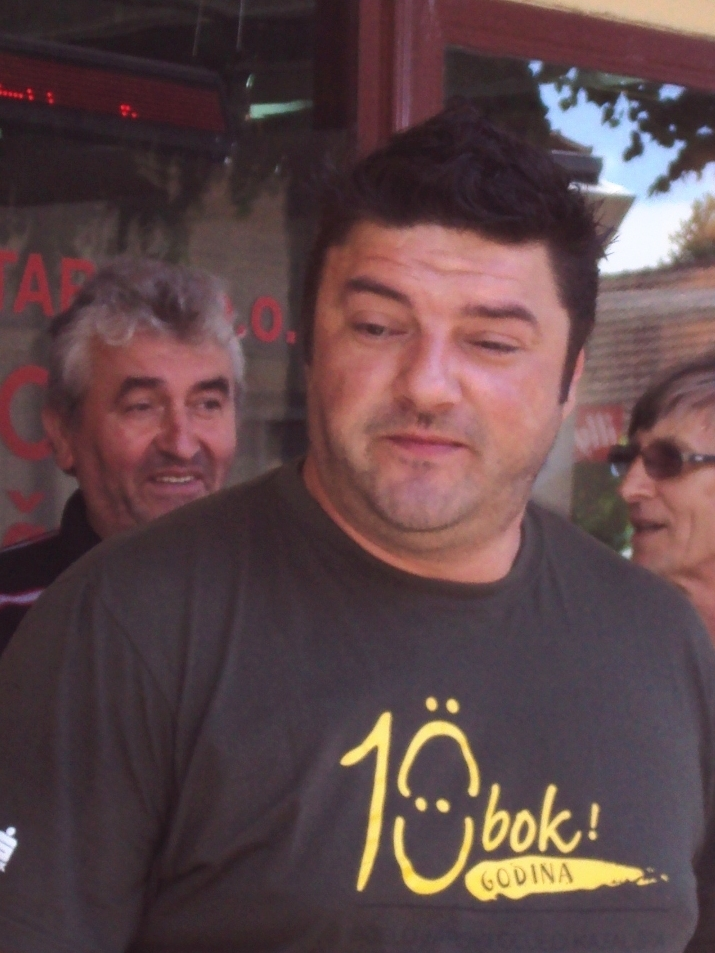
- Navojec in 2012
- Born: 10 October 1970 (age 55); Bjelovar, SR Croatia, SFR Yugoslavia
- Occupation: Actor
- Spouse: Larisa Lipovac (m. 2009; div. 2015)
- Children: 1
- Relatives: Bojan Navojec (brother)

Goran Navojec (born 10 October 1970) is a Croatian actor and musician. In his three decade long career, Navojec has starred in numerous films including The Three Men of Melita Žganjer (1998), God Forbid a Worse Thing Should Happen (2002), Long Dark Night (2004), Two Players from the Bench (2005), The Parade (2011), Our Everyday Life (2015) and My Late Summer (2024). He has also had prominent roles on television, including the gawky, vulnerable doctor Toni Grgeč in the comedy series Naša mala klinika (2004–2007) and comical but tough Refko Mujkić in Lud, zbunjen, normalan (2010–2015).

== Career ==
=== Theater ===
Navojec has appeared regularly on stage, including a lauded performance as the title prince in a 2004 production of Hamlet. He has also worked for various American and British stage and screen productions, including Coriolanus and Mission: Impossible – Ghost Protocol (both 2011).

=== Television ===
Navojec starred in Naša mala klinika, the first Croatian sitcom television series, as dr. Toni Grgeč. The series ran on Nova TV from 2004 to 2007. He also portrayed Dudo Kosmički in Odmori se, zaslužio si, a comedy series that was broadcast on HRT from 2016 to 2013. Since 2020, Navojec stars as the titular character in HRT's comedy series Mrkomir Prvi.

Aside from his acting roles, Navojec has been one of the team captains on HRT's game shows television series Volim Hrvatsku since 2012. Since 2014, Navojec has been the recurring main judge on Tvoje lice zvuči poznato, the Croatian edition of Your Face Sounds Familiar, which is broadcast on Nova TV.

=== Voice acting ===
He has a distinct bass-baritone voice and has done voice-work for numerous Croatian-language dubs of animated features and radio dramas. He has voiced Mr. Ray in the Finding Nemo franchise (2003–2016), Junior in Home on the Range (2004), Boog in Open Season (2006), Bad Bill in Rango (2011) and Bomb in The Angry Birds Movies (2016, 2019).

=== Music ===
Apart from his eminent acting career, he has also performed as a musician. Since 2010, he has been a part of Bosnian pop-rock band Karne, a group he formed alongside Miraj Grbić and Feđa Isović. With Karne, Navojec released one album called Diktatura amatera in 2012.

== Accolades ==
For his body of work, Navojec has received critical acclaim and numerous awards. For his role in 2016's Sve najbolje, he won a Golden Arena for Best Supporting Actor.

== Selected filmography ==
=== Film ===
Year	Title	Role	Notes
1994	Vukovar: The Way Home	Vinko	
1996	How the War Started on My Island	Martin	
1998	The Three Men of Melita Žganjer	Janko	
2002	God Forbid a Worse Thing Should Happen	Emil	
2004	Long Dark Night	Matija Čačić - Mata	
2005	Two Players from the Bench	Ante Jukić	
2011	Kotlovina	Damir	
2011	Mission: Impossible – Ghost Protocol	Russian prisoner	
2011	The Parade	Roko	
2015	Our Everyday Life	Hike	
2018	The Eighth Commissioner	Selim	
2021	Not So Friendly Neighborhood Affair	Cafe Owner	
2024	My Late Summer	Ico	

=== Television ===
Year	Title	Role	Notes
2004–2007	Naša mala klinika	Dr. Toni Grgeč	TV series
2010	Tito	Marshal Fyodor Tolbukhin	TV film
2010–2011	The Scent of Rain in the Balkans	Škoro	TV series
2010–2015	Lud, zbunjen, normalan	Reufik "Refko" Mehmeda Mujkić	TV series
2012–present	Volim Hrvatsku	Himself	Team captain (seasons 1–2, 4–11)
2014–present	Tvoje lice zvuči poznato	Himself	Main judge (seasons 1, 3–4, 6–10)
2020–present	Mrkomir Prvi	Mrkomir	TV series
2021–present	Dnevnik velikog Perice	Karlo Bulić	Main role
2023–present	Oblak u službi zakona	Suvi	TV series

== Discography ==
=== with Karne ===
- Diktatura amatera – 2012
