= Iska's Journey =

- French: Iszka utazása
- Directed by: Csaba Bollók
- Written by: Csaba Bollók
- Produced by: Ágnes Csere
- Starring: Mária Varga; Rózsika Varga; Marian Rusache; Marius Bodochi; Dan Tudor; Ágnes Csere; Gergely Levente
- Distributed by: Merkel Film
- Release date: 22 November 2007
- Running time: 92 minutes
- Country: Hungary
- Languages: Hungarian, Romanian
- Budget: HUF 154,000,000

Iska's Journey (Hungarian: Iszka utazása) is a 2007 Hungarian film written and directed by Csaba Bollók and stars newcomer Mária Varga.

== Synopsis ==
The film is the result of director Bollók's accidental meeting with a 14-year-old street child, Maria Varga, living in a coalmining town of the Southern Carpathians. The story follows her journey from her small town to the Black Sea, where she becomes a victim of human trafficking.

== Distribution and response ==
The film was first screened in February 2007 at the Hungarian Film Festival, where it ended up as the surprise winner of the Grand Prize. After its international premier at the Berlinale in 2007, Iska's Journey was received on the international festival circuit as a huge success. More than 50 European, Asian, and American film festivals have presented Bollók's feature to date. Following its North American premier in Seattle last year, Iska's Journey was presented in Chicago, Cleveland, Toronto, Palm Springs and Vancouver.

It was commercially released in Hungary on 22 November 2007. The film was chosen as Hungary's official submission to the 81st Academy Awards for Best Foreign Language Film.
