= The Awkward Age (film) =

1994 film

- Theatrical release poster
- Directed by: Nenad Dizdarević
- Written by: Nenad Dizdarević
- Starring: Draško Trninić
- Release date: 1994
- Running time: 97 minutes
- Countries: Bosnia and Herzegovina
- Language: Bosnian

The Awkward Age (Serbo-Croatian: Magareće godine, lit. 'Year of the Donkey') is a 1994 Bosnian drama film directed by Nenad Dizdarević. The film was selected as the Bosnian entry for the Best Foreign Language Film at the 67th Academy Awards, but was not accepted as a nominee.

== Cast ==
- Draško Trninić as Brankić
- Sedin Kahriman as Baja
- Igor Bjelan as Dule Dabić
- Esvedin Husić as Krsto Buva
- Milan Lazić as Branko Mandić
- Milenko Lazić as Ranko Mandić
- Biljana Preradović as Zora Tanković
- Sabina Tabić as Zora Kutić

== See also ==
- List of submissions to the 67th Academy Awards for Best Foreign Language Film
- List of Bosnian submissions for the Academy Award for Best Foreign Language Film
