= Mirjana Karanović =

Serbian actress (born 1957)

- Мирјана Карановић
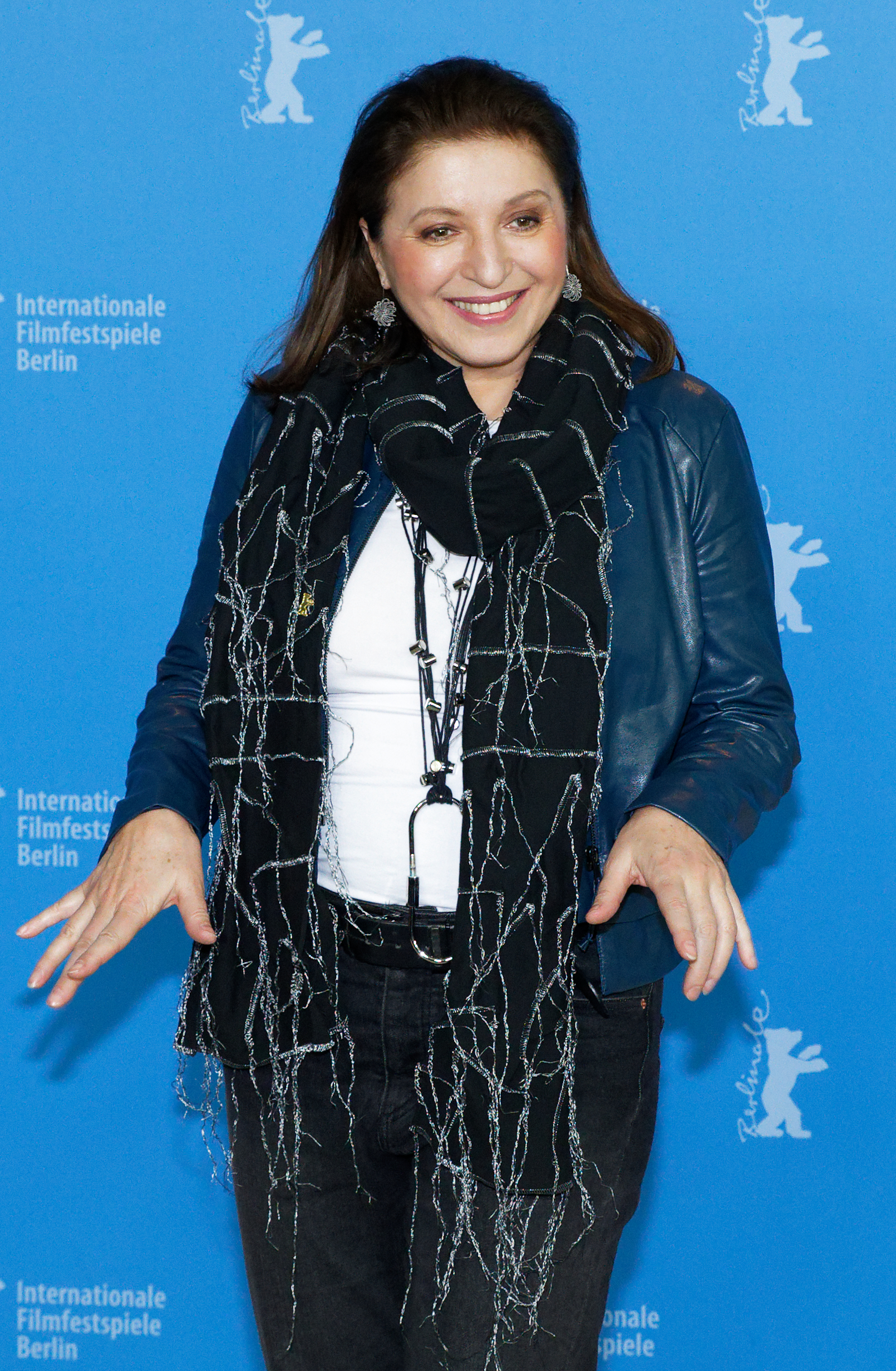
- Mirjana Karanović at 2017 Berlinale
- Born: 28 January 1957 (age 69); Belgrade, PR Serbia, Yugoslavia
- Education: Faculty of Dramatic Arts
- Alma mater: University of Arts in Belgrade
- Occupations: Actress, film director, screenwriter, activist
- Years active: 1980–present

Mirjana Karanović (Serbian Cyrillic: Мирјана Карановић; born 28 January 1957) is a Serbian actress, film director and screenwriter. Considered one of the best Serbian and Yugoslavian actresses of all time, she is probably the best known for her performance in her debut film Petria's Wreath (Petrijin venac), as well as for her frequent collaborations with film directors Emir Kusturica and Jasmila Žbanić. Karanović received international acclaim and a nomination for European Film Award for Best Actress for her role in Žbanić's Grbavica.

Karanović's directorial debut, A Good Wife (Dobra žena), had its world premiere at the 2016 Sundance Film Festival.

== Early life ==
Mirjana Karanović was born on 28 January 1957 in Belgrade. Her father Miloje was a soldier, and her mother Radmila (1932 — 2023) was a tailor.

== Acting career ==
She made her screen debut in the 1980 film Petrijin venac ("Petrija's Wreath"), earning accolades for her portrayal of an illiterate Serbian woman. She is best known to international audiences for her portrayal of the mother in the 1985 film When Father Was Away on Business.

In 1995, she appeared in the film Underground, directed by famous Serbian director Emir Kusturica.

In 2003, Mirjana Karanović again made history by appearing in Croatian film Svjedoci (Witnesses). She was the first actor from Serbia to appear in a Croatian film since the breakup of Yugoslavia. In the film, she played a Croatian war widow.

In 2005, she appeared in the film Grbavica by the Bosnian director Jasmila Žbanić, in which she played a Muslim woman who had to come to terms with her teenage daughter regarding the nature of her birth. In this film, she portrays a rape victim abused by Serbs during the Bosnian War.

In 2013, Mirjana Karanović appeared in Greek-Serbian co production The Tree and the Swing (aka A Place Called Home) by Greek film director Maria Douza, and was nominated for Best Supporting Actress Award by the Hellenic Film Academy in 2014. In the film she plays Nina, the daughter of Greek refugee Kyriakos Karapanos (Elias Logothetis).

== Activism ==
Karanović has been an active supporter of LGBT rights. She is one of the founders of Incest Trauma Center, which provides psychological assistance to child and adult survivors of sexual violence and their supportive persons.

In 2017, Karanović has signed the Declaration on the Common Language of the Croats, Serbs, Bosniaks and Montenegrins.

== Personal life ==
Karanović was never married and she doesn't have children. She is an atheist.

In 2004, she dated Bosnian actor Ermin Bravo, who is 22 years her junior.

== Filmography ==
Title	Translated title	Year	Role	Notes
Petrijin venac	Petria's Wreath	1980	Petrija	
Majstori, majstori	All That Jacks	1980	Dunja	
Pad Italije	The Fall of Italy	1981	Mare	
Topola s terase		1981	Ana	TV film
Stari Beograd		1981	Girl	TV film
Slučaj Bogoljuba Savkovića Livca		1981	Girl	Short film
Bila jednom ljubav jedna		1981	Rich lady	TV film
Dvije polovine srca		1982	Mother	
Kazivanja		1982		TV short
Beograd, nekad i sad		1982	Ljuba / Buba / Ingrid	TV film
Imenjaci		1983		TV series, 1 episode
Kamiondžije opet voze		1984	Alapača	TV series, 1 episode
Provincija u pozadini		1984		TV film
Bele udovice		1984		TV film
Otac na službenom putu	When Father Was Away on Business	1985	Senija	
Život je lep	Life Is Beautiful	1985	Auto-stopper	
Tombola		1985	Olga	TV film
Rodoljupci		1986	Zelenićka	TV film
Pokondirena tikva		1986	Fema	TV film
Obećana zemlja	The Promised Land	1986	Marta	
Uvek spremne žene		1987	Majstor	
Marjuča ili smrt	Marjuča, or Death	1987	Marjuča	
Na putu za Katangu	On the Road to Katanga	1987	Žana	
The Fortunate Pilgrim	—N/a	1988	Clara	TV miniseries
Dom Bergmanovih		1988	Ana	TV film
Srce i njena deca		1988	Srce	Also known as Jednog lepog dana
Vreme čuda	Time of Miracles	1989	Marta	
Sabirni centar	The Meeting Point	1989	Jelena Katić	
The Legendary Life of Ernest Hemingway	—N/a	1989		
Seobe 2		1989	Evdokija Božić	
Vreme čuda	Time of Miracles	1989	Marta	TV miniseries
Stremnicka		1989	Isidora Sekulić	TV film
Holivud ili propast		1990		TV film
Mala	The Little One	1991	Božidarka	
Bolje od bekstva	Better Than Escape	1993	Radmila	
Fazoni i fore		1993	Alapača	TV series
Buket		1993		Short film
Otvorena vrata	Open Door	1994	Žana	TV series, 1 episode
Podzemlje	Underground	1995	Vera Popara	
Bila jednom jedna zemlja	Underground	1996	Vera Popara	TV miniseries
Tri letnja dana	Three Summer Days	1997	Landowner	
Kod lude ptice		1998	Guest	TV series, 1 episode
Tri palme za dve bitange i ribicu	Three Palms for Two Punks and a Babe	1998	Headmistress	
Bure baruta	Cabaret Balkan	1998	Natalija	
Porodično blago		1998	Suzana	TV series, 1998–99
Forma formalina		1999	Mother	Short film
Fazoni i fore 2		2002	Alapača	TV series
Netaknuti sunce		2002	Mother	Short film
Jagoda u supermarketu	Strawberries in the Supermarket	2003	The owner of the supermarket	
Svjedoci	Witnesses	2003	Mother	
Tragom Karađorđa		2004	Marica	TV miniseries
Život je čudo	Life Is a Miracle	2004	Nada	
Stižu dolari	The Dollars Are Coming	2004	Nevenka Krstić	TV series, 2004–06
Go West	—N/a	2005	Ranka	
Grbavica	—N/a	2006	Esma	
Das Fräulein	—N/a	2006	Ruža	
Blodsbånd	Mirush	2007	Hava	
Tegla puna vazduha		2007	Ljubica	TV film
Ono naše što nekad bejaše		2007	Atanasov's wife	TV series
Bela lađa	White Ship	2008	Luja Pantić	TV series
Vratiće se rode	The Storks Will Return	2007	Radmila Švabić	TV series, 2007–08
Tamo i ovde	Here and There	2009	Olga	
Neko me ipak čeka		2009	Mother	TV film
Čekaj me, ja sigurno neću doći	Wait for Me and I Will Not Come	2009	Anđa	
Na putu	On the Path	2010	Nađa	
Torta sa čokoladom	Chocolate Cake	2010	Višnja	Short film
1000 Gramm		2011	Damil's mother	Short film
Crna Zorica	Loveless Zorica	2012	Petrana	
Smrt čoveka na Balkanu	Death of a Man in the Balkans	2012	Buyer	
Vir	The Whirl	2012	Inspector	
To dentro kai i kounia	A Place Called Home	2013	Nina	
Spomenik Majklu Džeksonu	Monument to Michael Jackson	2014	Darinka	
Kosac	The Reaper	2014	Mirjana	
Cure: The Life of Another	—N/a	2014	Grandmother	
Jednaki		2014	Nina	Segment: "Katarina"
Tri Dritare dhe një Varje	Three Windows and a Hanging	2014	Maria / The journalist	
Urgentni centar	ER	2015	Jasmina Ilić	TV series, 1 episode
Pored mene	Next to Me	2015	Headmistress	
Dobra žena	A Good Wife	2016	Milena	Also director and writer
Herostrat		2016		Short film
Sumnjiva lica		2016	Tina	TV series
Dnevnik mašinovođe	Train Driver's Diary	2016	Jagoda	
Ubice mog oca		2016	Chief Inspector Obradović	TV series
Rekvijem za gospođu J.	Requiem for Mrs. J.	2017	Mrs. J	
Paviljon	The Pavilion	2025		It will open 31st Sarajevo Film Festival

== Awards and nominations ==
Award	Year	Category	Nominated work	Result
Art Film Fest	2007	Actor's Mission Award	—N/a	Won
Brussels Film Festival	2006	Best Actress	Grbavica	Won
Cairo International Film Festival	2016	Golden Pyramid	A Good Wife	Nominated
Chlotrudis Awards	2008	Best Actress	Grbavica	Nominated
Cleveland International Film Festival	2016	Best Film in the Eastern European Competition	A Good Wife	Won
European Film Awards	2006	Best Actress	Grbavica	Nominated
FEST Belgrade International Film Festival	2016	Best Actress	A Good Wife	Won
FEST Belgrade International Film Festival	2017	Best Actress	Requiem for Mrs. J.	Won
Gothenburg Film Festival	2016	International Debut Award	A Good Wife	Nominated
Hellenic Film Academy Awards	2014	Best Supporting Actress	A Place Called Home	Nominated
Motovun Film Festival	2016	FIPRESCI Award	A Good Wife	Won
Pula Film Festival	1980	Best Actress	Petria's Wreath	Won
Pula Film Festival	1985	Best Actress	When Father Was Away on Business	Won
Skopje Film Festival	2016	Best Film in the Balkan Selection	A Good Wife	Nominated
SOFEST Sopot Film Festival	2013	Best Actress	The Whirl	Won
Sundance Film Festival	2016	Grand Jury Prize (World Cinema – Dramatic)	A Good Wife	Nominated
Trophées Francophones du Cinema	2015	Best Supporting Actress	A Place Called Home	Nominated
Žanka Stokić Award	2011	Outstanding Contribution to Film, Television and Theatre	—N/a	Won
Dobričin Prsten Award	2019	Outstanding Contribution to Theatre	Lifetime achievement	Won
