= Nenad Dizdarević =

Bosnian film director

Nenad Dizdarević (born 21 May 1955) is a film director, screenwriter, producer, and teacher of cinema from Sarajevo, Bosnia and Herzegovina. His most notable film, Magareće godine (1994), was the Bosnian submission to the Academy Awards in 1995. He is the co-founder of the Sarajevo Academy of Arts.

== Awards and honors ==
Dizdarević received a Golden Palm in 1994 for Magareće godine at the Valencia Festival of Mediterranean Cinema.

== Filmography ==
Year	Title	Other notes
1977	Žena na kamenu (TV)	
1981	Gazija	
1985	I to ce proći	
1990	Stanica običnih vozova	
1994	Magareće godine	or Âge ingrat, L' (France), or The Awkward Age or The Tough Teens (International: English title)
1995	The Fourth Part of the Brain	
