= A Cell Phone Movie =

2011 film

- Directed by: Nedžad Begović
- Written by: Nedžad Begović
- Release date: July 2011
- Running time: 62 minutes
- Countries: Bosnia and Herzegovina
- Language: Bosnian

A Cell Phone Movie is a 2011 Bosnian documentary film directed by Nedžad Begović. The film was shot entirely on a Camera phone, LG Viewty. The film won the Best Documentary Award at the 2011 Sarajevo Film Festival and the Jury Award for Best Documentary Film at 2012 Bosnian-Herzegovinian Film Festival in New York.

== See also ==
- List of films shot on mobile phones
