= Sadžida Šetić =

Bosnian actress

- Born: March 6, 1968 (age 58); Sarajevo, Bosnia and Herzegovina
- Occupation: Actress

Sadžida Šetić (born March 6, 1968, in Sarajevo) is a Bosnian actress. Her film credits include My Aunt in Sarajevo, Snow and Sabina K..
