= Snežana Bogdanović =

Serbian actress

- Born: 5 November 1960 (age 64); Zemun, SFR Yugoslavia
- Occupation: Actress
- Years active: 1986–present

Snežana Bogdanović (Serbian Cyrillic: Снежана Богдановић; born 5 November 1960) is a Serbian film and television actress.

== Selected filmography ==
- Kuduz (1989)
- Moj brat Aleksa (1991)
- The Original of the Forgery (1991)
- Courage the Cowardly Dog (2002)
- Stitches (2019)
- The Son (2019)
