= The White Fortress =

2021 drama film

- Theatrical release poster
- Bosnian: Tabija
- Directed by: Igor Drljaca
- Written by: Igor Drljaca
- Produced by: Igor Drljaca; Albert Shin; Amra Bakšić Čamo; Jordan Barker; Adis Đapo; Borga Dorter
- Starring: Pavle Čemerikić; Sumeja Dardagan
- Cinematography: Erol Zubčević
- Edited by: Ajla Odobašić
- Music by: Casey Manierka-Quaile
- Production companies: TimeLapse Pictures; SCCA/pro.ba
- Release date: March 1, 2021 (Berlin)
- Running time: 88 minutes
- Countries: Canada; Bosnia and Herzegovina
- Languages: Bosnian; English

The White Fortress (Bosnian: Tabija) is a 2021 Bosnian-Canadian coming-of-age drama film written and directed by Igor Drljaca.

The film premiered on March 1, 2021 at the 71st Berlin International Film Festival. Produced by Canada's Timelapse Pictures and Bosnia-Herzegovina's SCCA/pro.ba, it had its Canadian premiere at the 2021 Vancouver International Film Festival. It was selected as the Bosnian entry for the Best International Feature Film at the 94th Academy Awards.

== Plot ==
Faruk (Pavle Čemerikić), a teenage orphan living with his grandmother in the suburbs of Sarajevo, is drawn into a romance with Mona (Sumeja Dardagan), a member of a wealthy, politically powerful family.

The film's cast also includes Izudin Bajrović, Ermin Bravo, Hasija Borić, Kerim Čutuna and Jasmin Geljo.

== Reception ==
The film received generally positive reviews, with critics frequently highlighting its blend of social realism and romance and its Sarajevo setting. On Rotten Tomatoes, the film holds a 100% approval rating based on 16 critic reviews. On Metacritic, it has a weighted average score of 79 out of 100, based on seven critic reviews, indicating "generally favorable reviews".

In Variety, Jessica Kiang described the film as a "moving" and "impressively controlled" social-realist romance, praising its restraint and naturalistic performances and noting how the love story is shaped by economic and social boundaries in contemporary Sarajevo.

Writing for The Hollywood Reporter, Sheri Linden emphasized the film’s character-driven approach, stating that Drljača’s dialogue is "sharp and alive throughout" and highlighting the emotional credibility of the central relationship.

Barry Hertz of The Globe and Mail offered a particularly enthusiastic assessment, calling the film "beautifully haunting," "hypnotizing," and "destined to linger," and praising Drljača’s "deft poetic touch" and the way the film "luxuriates in character and place" while expressing the lingering psychological weight of war and the stark class divisions of post-war Sarajevo.

European critics were similarly positive. In Cineuropa, Vladan Petković described the film as Drljača’s most accomplished feature to date and noted how the narrative gradually shifts from crime drama into romance. A more mixed response came from Film Threat, where Alex Saveliev wrote that the film’s multiple thematic strands sometimes compete with one another, causing it to lose focus at times, even while praising its attention to small character moments.

== Awards ==
The film was named to the Toronto International Film Festival's annual year-end Canada's Top Ten list for 2021.

Festival / Organization	Date	Category	Recipient(s)	Result
Canadian Screen Awards	April 10, 2022	Best Actor	Pavle Čemerikić	Nominated
Canadian Screen Awards	April 10, 2022	Best Original Screenplay	Igor Drljača	Nominated
Vancouver Film Critics Circle	March 8, 2022	Best Actor in a Canadian Film	Pavle Čemerikić	Nominated
Vancouver Film Critics Circle	March 8, 2022	Best Screenplay for a Canadian Film	Igor Drljača	Nominated
Vancouver Film Critics Circle	March 8, 2022	One to Watch	Pavle Čemerikić	Nominated
Festival du nouveau cinéma	October 2021	National Competition – Prix de la diffusion Québecor (Honourable Mention)	The White Fortress	Honored
Sarajevo Film Festival	August 2022	Ivica Matić Award for Best Film (presented by the Association of Film Workers of Bosnia and Herzegovina)	The White Fortress	Won
Alexandria Mediterranean Film Festival	October 2022	Naguib Mahfouz Award for Best Screenplay	Igor Drljača	Won
Alexandria Mediterranean Film Festival	October 2022	Omar Sharif Award for Best Actor	Pavle Čemerikić	Won
Alexandria Mediterranean Film Festival	October 2022	Faten Hamama Award for Best Actress	Sumeja Dardagan	Won

== See also ==
- List of submissions to the 94th Academy Awards for Best International Feature Film
- List of Bosnian submissions for the Academy Award for Best International Feature Film
