= Holiday in Sarajevo =

1991 short film by Benjamin Filipović

Praznik u Sarajevu (English: Holiday in Sarajevo) is a 1991 film set in Western Europe and Sarajevo, with a set of Sarajevan thieves returning home for the Christmas holidays. It was directed by Benjamin Filipović and written by Abdulah Sidran.
