= Grbavica (film) =

- Grbavica film poster
- Directed by: Jasmila Žbanić
- Written by: Jasmila Žbanić; Barbara Albert
- Produced by: Tanja Aćimović; Damir Ibrahimović
- Starring: Mirjana Karanović; Luna Mijović
- Distributed by: Dogwoof Pictures
- Release dates: 12 February 2006 (BIFF); 1 March 2006 (Bosnia and Herzegovina); 15 December 2006 (UK)
- Running time: 90 minutes
- Countries: Bosnia and Herzegovina, Austria, Croatia, and Germany
- Language: Bosnian

Grbavica is a 2006 film by Jasmila Žbanić about the life of a single mother in contemporary Sarajevo in the aftermath of systematic rapes of Bosniak women by Serbian soldiers during the Bosnian War. It was released in the United Kingdom as Esma's Secret: Grbavica, and in US as Grbavica: Land of My Dreams.

The film shows, through the eyes of the main character Esma, her teenage daughter Sara, and others, how everyday life is still being shaped by the Bosnian War of the 1990s. The film was an international co-production between companies from Bosnia, Austria, Croatia, and Germany; it received funding from the German television companies ZDF and Arte. Grbavica received an enthusiastic response from critics, earning a 98% rating on Rotten Tomatoes.

It won the Golden Bear at the 56th Berlin International Film Festival and it was Bosnia and Herzegovina's official entry for the Best Foreign Language Film at the 79th Academy Awards but it was not nominated.

== Background ==
The title refers to the neighbourhood of Sarajevo where Esma lives, which was one of the most traumatized neighbourhoods in the city.

According to the director,

...in 1992 everything changed and I realized that I was living in a war in which sex was used as part of a war strategy to humiliate women and thereby cause the destruction of an ethnic group. 20,000 women were systematically raped in Bosnia during the war.

In the film, the Serbian rapists are referred to as Chetniks, a term which some of the population of Sarajevo (mostly Bosnian Muslims and Croats and Sarajevan Serbs) used for the besieging Serb troops.

== Plot ==
Single mother Esma lives with her 12-year-old daughter Sara in post-war Sarajevo. Sara wants to go on a school field trip and her mother starts working as a waitress at a nightclub to earn the money for the trip.

Sara befriends Samir, who, like Sara, has no father. Both of their fathers allegedly died as war heroes. Samir is surprised to find out that Sara does not know the circumstances of her father's death. Samir's own father was killed by Serbian military near Žuč when he refused to leave the trench he was defending. Whenever Sara and her mother discuss this delicate topic, however, Esma's responses are always vague. The situation grows more complicated when students who can provide a certificate proving that they are the offspring of war heroes can go on the field trip for free. Esma explains to Sara that her father's corpse was never found and that she has no certificate. She promises to try to obtain the document. Secretly, however, Esma attempts to borrow the money Sara needs from her friend Sabina, her aunt and her boss.

Sara is haunted by a nagging feeling that something is not right. Shocked and bewildered when she discovers she is not mentioned as the child of a war hero on the list of pupils going on the school trip, Sara lashes out at Samir. At home, however, she confronts her mother and demands to know the truth. Esma breaks down and finally admits that she was raped at a prisoner camp and forced to have the child who resulted from this violation. Sara realizes she is the child of a Serbian soldier. This discovery brings her closer to her mother and helps overcome her trauma. In the end, Sara leaves for the field trip, not waving to her mother until the last moment. On the bus, the students start to sing a popular 70s song "Sarajevo, ljubavi moja" (English Sarajevo, My Love), written and performed by Kemal Monteno, and Sara joins in.

== Cast ==
- Mirjana Karanović as Esma Halilović
- Luna Mijović as Sara
- Leon Lučev as Pelda
- Kenan Ćatić as Samir
- Jasna Beri as Sabina
- Dejan Aćimović as Čenga
- Bogdan Diklić as Šaran
- Emir Hadžihafizbegović as Puška
- Ermin Bravo as Professor Muha
- Semka Sokolović-Bertok as Pelda's Mother
- Maike Höhne as Jabolka
- Jasna Žalica as Plema
- Nada Đurevska as Aunt Safija
- Emina Muftić as Vasvija
- Dunja Pašić as Mila

== Reception ==
On the review aggregator website Rotten Tomatoes, 98% of 43 critics' reviews are positive, with an average rating of 7.5/10. The website's consensus reads: "An emotionally blunt and gripping drama, Grbavica deftly explores the emotional toll that all wars take upon those who survive them." Metacritic, which uses a weighted average, assigned the film a score of 71 out of 100, based on 21 critics, indicating "generally favorable" reviews.

== Awards ==
Wins

- Golden Bear – Best Film – 56th Berlin International Film Festival 2006
- Peace Film Award – Berlin Film Festival 2006
- Prize of the Ecumenical Jury – Berlin Film Festival 2006
- Kosomorama Award – Best Film
- Reykjavik International Film Festival – Best Film
- AFI Film Festival – Narrative Grand Jury Prize
- Brussels European Film Festival – Prize TV Canvas for Best Film and Award Best Actress (to Mirjana Karanović)
- Ourence Film Festival – Award Best Actress (to Mirjana Karanović)
- Portland International Film Festival – Audience Award
- Thessaloniki Film Festival – Woman & Equality Award
- Bosnian-Herzegovinian Film Festival in New York – Audience Award
- Sarajevo Film Festival – Ivica Matić Award for director

Nominations

- Sundance Film Festival – Grand Jury Prize
- European Film Award – Best Film and Best Actress

== See also ==
- List of submissions to the 79th Academy Awards for Best Foreign Language Film
