= Men Don't Cry (film) =

2017 film

- Film poster
- Directed by: Alen Drljević
- Written by: Alen Drljević
- Produced by: Damir Ibrahimović; Jasmila Žbanić
- Starring: Boris Isaković; Leon Lučev; Emir Hadžihafizbegović; Ermin Bravo; Ivo Gregurević; Sebastian Cavazza; Izudin Bajrović
- Release date: 1 July 2017 (Karlovy Vary)
- Running time: 98 minutes
- Countries: Bosnia and Herzegovina
- Language: Bosnian

Men Don't Cry (Bosnian: Muškarci ne plaču) is a 2017 Bosnian drama film directed by Alen Drljević. It was selected as the Bosnian entry for the Best Foreign Language Film at the 90th Academy Awards, but it was not nominated. The film won the 2017 Special Jury Prize at the 52nd Karlovy Vary International Film Festival.

== Plot ==
A group of disparate, middle-aged Yugoslav War veterans talk in an extended group-therapy session.

== Cast ==
- Boris Isaković as Miki
- Leon Lučev as Valentin
- Emir Hadžihafizbegović as Merim
- Ermin Bravo as Ahmed
- Ivo Gregurević as Josip
- Sebastian Cavazza as Ivan
- Izudin Bajrović as receptionist

== See also ==
- List of submissions to the 90th Academy Awards for Best Foreign Language Film
- List of Bosnian submissions for the Academy Award for Best Foreign Language Film
