= Our Everyday Life =

2015 film

- Film poster
- Directed by: Ines Tanović
- Written by: Ines Tanović
- Starring: Uliks Fehmiu; Mediha Musliović; Goran Navojec; Emir Hadžihafizbegović
- Release date: 20 August 2015 (SFF)
- Running time: 89 minutes
- Countries: Bosnia and Herzegovina; Croatia; Germany; Slovenia
- Language: Bosnian

Our Everyday Life (Bosnian: Naša svakodnevna priča) is a 2015 Bosnian drama film directed by Ines Tanović. It was selected as the Bosnian entry for the Best Foreign Language Film at the 88th Academy Awards but it was not nominated.

== Cast ==
- Uliks Fehmiu as Saša
- Mediha Musliović as Sabina
- Goran Navojec as Hike
- Emir Hadžihafizbegović as Muhamed
- Maja Izetbegović as Lejla
- Goran Bogdan as Damir
- Boro Stjepanović as Aljo
- Enis Bešlagić as Hare
- Aleksandar Seksan as Slaviša
- Mirvad Kurić as Etko
- Moamer Kasumović as Malik

== See also ==
- List of submissions to the 88th Academy Awards for Best Foreign Language Film
- List of Bosnian submissions for the Academy Award for Best Foreign Language Film
