= Benjamin Filipović =

Bosnian film director

Benjamin Filipović (1962 – 20 July 2006) was a Bosnian film director. He taught at the directing department of the Academy of Performing Arts in Sarajevo. He died of a heart attack.

== Filmography ==
- Praznik u Sarajevu (Holiday in Sarajevo, 1991)
- Mizaldo, kraj Teatra (Mizaldo, By the Theater, 1994)
- Dobro uštimani mrtvaci (Well-Tempered Corpses, 2005)
