= Ermin Bravo =

Bosnian actor

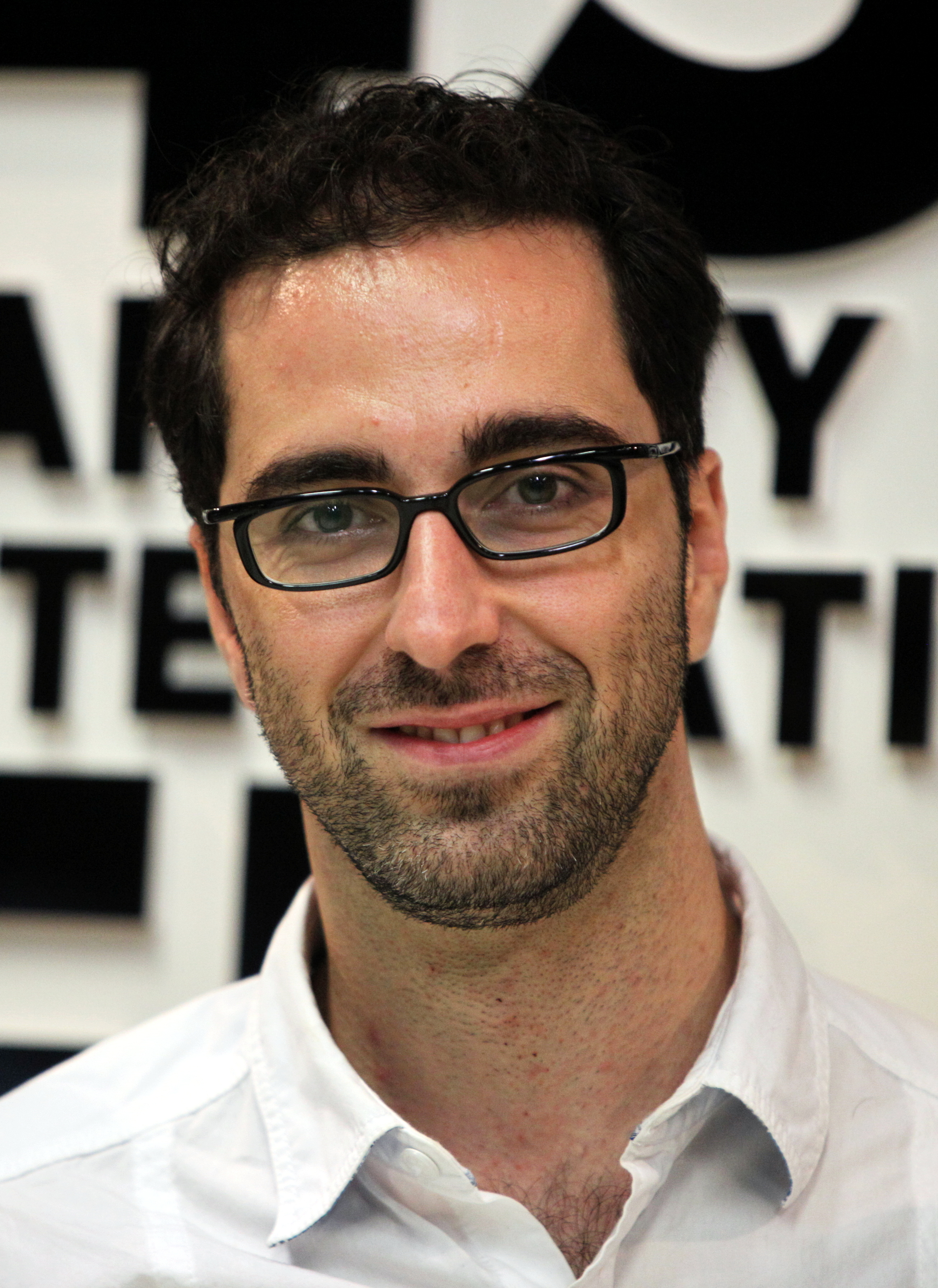
- Born: 5 December 1979 (age 46); Sarajevo, SR Bosnia and Herzegovina, SFR Yugoslavia
- Occupation: Actor
- Years active: 2001–present

Ermin Bravo (born 5 December 1979) is a Bosnian actor. He has appeared in more than ten films since 2001. He is most known for starring in the 2003 Bosnian film Remake. Bravo is also remembered as a unique character in the 2017 film Men Don't Cry.

In 2017, he signed the Declaration on the Common Language of the Croats, Serbs, Bosniaks and Montenegrins.

== Personal life ==
Bravo dated Serbian actress Mirjana Karanović who is 22 years his senior.

== Selected filmography ==
=== Films ===
Year	Title	Role	Notes
2003	Remake	Tarik Karaga	
2006	Grbavica	Professor Muha	
2012	In the Land of Blood and Honey	Mehmet	
2015	Love Island	Grebo	
2017	Grain	Cemil Akman	
2017	Men Don't Cry	Ahmed	
2020	Quo Vadis, Aida?	The Mayor	
2021	The White Fortress	Cedo	
2025	The Pavilion		It open 31st Sarajevo Film Festival

=== Television ===
Year	Title	Role	Notes
2023	I Know Your Soul	Haris Murtezić	6 episodes
