= An Episode in the Life of an Iron Picker =

2013 film

Episode in the Life of an Iron Picker
- Film poster
- Directed by: Danis Tanović
- Written by: Danis Tanović
- Produced by: Amra Bakšić Čamo; Čedomir Kolar; Danijel Hočevar
- Starring: Nazif Mujić
- Cinematography: Erol Zubčević
- Edited by: Timur Makarević
- Release dates: 13 February 2013 (Berlin); 16 August 2013 (Sarajevo FF)
- Running time: 75 minutes
- Countries: Bosnia and Herzegovina; France; Slovenia
- Languages: Bosnian; Roma

Episode in the Life of an Iron Picker (Bosnian: Epizoda u životu berača željeza) is 2013 drama film written and directed by Danis Tanović. The film premiered in competition at the 63rd Berlin International Film Festival where it won the Jury Grand Prix and Nazif Mujić won the Silver Bear for Best Actor. It was screened in the Contemporary World Cinema section at the 2013 Toronto International Film Festival. The film was selected as the Bosnian entry for the Best Foreign Language Film at the 86th Academy Awards, making the January shortlist.

== Plot summary ==
A Roma family lives in the Bosnia-Herzegovina countryside. Nazif salvages metal from old cars, selling it to a scrapmetal-dealer. His partner, Senada, is a housewife who looks after their two small daughters. One day, she feels an acute stomach pain. At the hospital, she is told her unborn child has died and, to prevent septicaemia, she should have an operation urgently. However, without funds or insurance, they cannot afford treatment. The couple seek desperately to raise the necessary funds before it is too late.

== Cast ==
- Nazif Mujić as Nazif
- Senada Alimanović as Senada
- Šemsa Mujić as Šemsa
- Sandra Mujić as Sandra

== See also ==
- List of submissions to the 86th Academy Awards for Best Foreign Language Film
- List of Bosnian submissions for the Academy Award for Best Foreign Language Film
