= Death in Sarajevo =

2016 film

- Film poster
- Directed by: Danis Tanović
- Written by: Danis Tanović
- Starring: Snežana Marković; Izudin Bajrović; Vedrana Seksan; Muhamed Hadžović; Jacques Weber; Aleksandar Seksan
- Cinematography: Erol Zubčević
- Edited by: Redzinald Simek
- Music by: Mirza Tahirović
- Release dates: 15 February 2016 (Berlin); 12 May 2016 (Bosnia)
- Running time: 85 minutes
- Countries: Bosnia and Herzegovina
- Languages: Bosnian; French
- Box office: $6,540

Death in Sarajevo (Bosnian: Smrt u Sarajevu) is a 2016 Bosnian drama film directed by Danis Tanović. It was selected to compete for the Golden Bear at the 66th Berlin International Film Festival. At Berlin it won the Jury Grand Prix, as well as FIPRESCI prize for films shown in competition. It was selected as the Bosnian entry for the Best Foreign Language Film at the 89th Academy Awards but it was not nominated.

== Cast ==
- Snežana Marković as Lamija
- Izudin Bajrović as Omer
- Vedrana Seksan as Vedrana
- Muhamed Hadžović as Gavrilo
- Jacques Weber as Jacques
- Aleksandar Seksan as Enco
- Faketa Salihbegović as Hatidža
- Edin Avdagić Koja as Edo

== Reception ==
The film received mixed reviews. Jay Weissberg praised the film in Variety as an "expertly modulated choral drama". Stephen Dalton writing for The Hollywood Reporter gave a negative review, noting, "The take-home message that historical narratives are always complex and contentious, especially in the Balkans, is unquestionably true but hardly a profound insight. Not quite a political thriller, not quite a provocative drama, not quite an inspired stage adaptation, Death in Sarajevo is a minor addition to Tanović's illustrious body of work."

Review aggregator Rotten Tomatoes reports that the film has an overall approval rating of 76%, based on 17 reviews, with an average rating of 7.5/10.

== See also ==
- List of submissions to the 89th Academy Awards for Best Foreign Language Film
- List of Bosnian submissions for the Academy Award for Best Foreign Language Film
