= Snow (2008 film) =

- Snijeg
- Directed by: Aida Begić
- Written by: Aida Begić; Elma Tataragić
- Produced by: François d'Artemare; Benny Drechsel; Karsten Stöter; Elma Tataragić
- Starring: Zana Marjanović
- Music by: Igor Camo
- Release date: 2008
- Running time: 100 minutes
- Countries: Bosnia and Herzegovina; Germany; France; Iran
- Language: Bosnian

Snow (Bosnian: Snijeg) is the 2008 debut film by Aida Begić.

== Plot ==
The movie takes place in autumn 1997, in the small Bosniak village of Slavno, in eastern Bosnia. Only the women and girls are left, along with an old grandfather and a little boy. All of the men have disappeared on account of the Bosnian war.

The most entrepreneurial of the women, Alma, a young widow, attempts to help the families survive by producing plum jam and pastries, but the village is too far away from the market to have any customers. Accidentally, she and another women meet a truck-driver from Zvornik, named Hamza, who offers to carry the goods to the market for them on the following Wednesday. However, he does not show up as agreed.

Suddenly Miro and Marc, agents of a Serb-backed foreign company, enter the town and propose to buy the whole area for 70,000 marks. After discussing the proposal, half of the women of the village agree, hoping to gain a better life in town. However, Alma and her old and ill mother-in-law Safija resist, even as winter approaches and the village is at risk to remain completely isolated from the outer world. Following a malfunction of their car and a sudden storm, the contract dealers are forced to remain in the village: one of them, Miro, is injured, and finally reveals that the bodies of the lost children are buried in the Blue Cave. All of the villagers travel to find the remains and reconcile with their memories. The day after, the first snow begins falling down softly, as Hamza, the truck-driver who proposed to carry their goods to market, drives in.

== Cast ==
- Zana Marjanović – Alma
- Jasna Beri – Nadija
- Sadžida Šetić – Jasmina
- Vesna Mašić – Safija
- Emir Hadžihafizbegović – Mehmed
- Irena Mulamuhić – Nena Fatima
- Jelena Kordić – Sabrina
- Jasmin Geljo – Miro
- Dejan Spasić – Marc
- Alma Terzić – Lejla
- Muhamed Hadžović – Hamza
- Benjamin Đip – Ali
- Nejla Keškić – Zehra
- Mirna Ždralović – Hana
- Emina Mahmutagić – Azra
