= Izudin Bajrović =

Bosnian-Herzegovinian actor

- Born: 9 February 1963 (age 63); Pljevlja, PR Montenegro, FPR Yugoslavia
- Education: Academy of Performing Arts in Sarajevo
- Occupation: Actor
- Years active: 1986–present

Izudin Bajrović (born 9 February 1963) is a Bosnian theater, film and television actor. He has appeared in more than forty films since 1986.

== Recent activity ==
In 2017, Bajrović signed the Declaration on the Common Language of the Croats, Serbs, Bosniaks and Montenegrins.

His son, Dino Bajrović, is also an actor, and the two starred together in the movie Quo Vadis, Aida?.

== Selected filmography ==
Film
Year	Title	Role	Notes
2003	Remake	Jovo	
2004	Days and Hours	Izudin	
2007	It's Hard to Be Nice	Doctor	
2012	Halima's Path	Salko	
2016	Death in Sarajevo	Omer	
2017	Men Don't Cry	Receptionist	
2020	Quo Vadis, Aida?	Nihad	
2021	The White Fortress	Branko	
2021	Not So Friendly Neighborhood Affair	Izo	
2022	The Happiest Man in the World	Asim	
2023	Excursion		
2025	How Come It's All Green Out Here?	Mirko	Premiered at KVIFF on 7 July
2026	Small Things	Father	
2026	The Widower	Mirsad	

Television
Year	Title	Role	Notes
2002–2008	Viza za budućnost	Miro Zvrk	206 episodes
2006–2007	Tata i zetovi	Jusuf	25 episodes
2018–2020	Novine	Marinko Prskalo	21 episodes
2022	Kotlina	Žarko	Mini-series; 5 episodes
2023	I Know Your Soul	Halid Kapić	Mini-series; 6 episodes
