= Ahmed Imamović =

- Born: 1971 (age 54–55); Sarajevo, SFR Yugoslavia
- Occupations: Film director, film producer and screenwriter

Ahmed Imamović (born 1971) is a Bosnian film director, film producer and screenwriter.

He directed the controversial film Go West and the short film 10 Minutes.

== Filmography ==
=== Film ===
Year	Film	Position
1994	Čovjek, Bog, Monstrum; English: Man, God, the Monster	Cinematographer
1997	Welcome to Sarajevo	Assistant director
2002	10 Minuta; English: 10 Minutes	Director
2005	Go West	Director, Writer, Producer
2010	Belvedere	Director

== Awards and nominations ==
Year	Festival	Award	For	Result
2002	European Film Awards	Best Short Film Award	10 Minuta	Won
2002	Sarajevo Film Festival	Prix UIP Sarajevo (European Short Film)	10 Minuta	Nominated
2005	Bratislava International Film Festival	Grand Prix	Go West	Won
2005	Montréal World Film Festival	Grand Prix des Amériques	Go West	Nominated
2005	Kimera Film Festival	Art. 3 Cost. Prize	Go West	Won
