= Aida Begić =

Bosnian film director and screenwriter

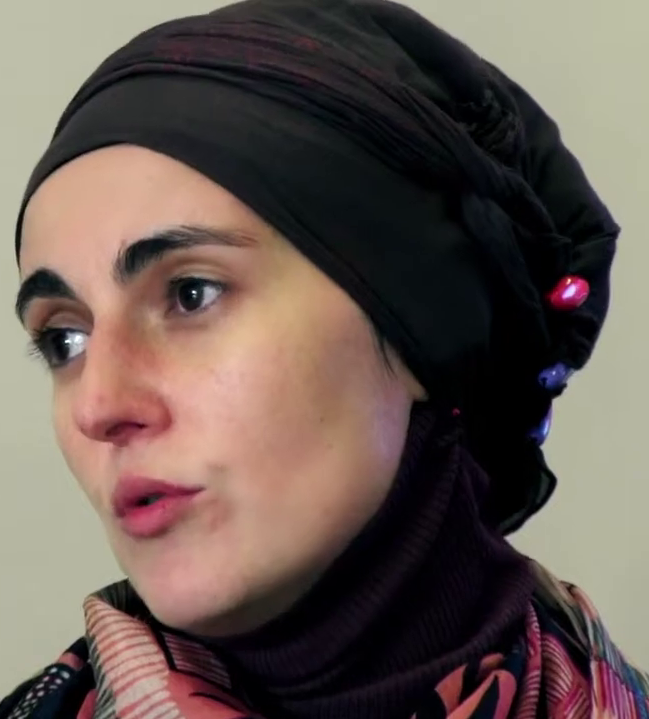
- Born: 9 May 1976 (age 49); Sarajevo, SR Bosnia and Herzegovina, Yugoslavia
- Occupation(s): Film director, screenwriter
- Years active: 2008–present

Aida Begić (born 9 May 1976) is a Bosnian film director and screenwriter.

== Education and career ==
She graduated in Film and Theater Directing from the Academy of Performing Arts in Sarajevo in 2000. Her graduation film "The First Death Experience" has been screened at more than twenty international film festivals. This film participated in the 54th Cannes Film Festival – Official Cinefondation Selection and later received five awards: Best Short Film – 6th Ourense Film Festival, Spain, 2002; Critics' Award – 30th Huesca International Film Festival, Spain, 2002; Methexis Award – MedFilm Festival, Italy, 2002; Special Jury Mention – 9th Archipelago New Media Film Festival and Short Film, Italy, 2001. Aida Begić is an assistant professor in directing (Prof. Haris Pašović) at the Academy of Performing Arts in Sarajevo. She made a number of commercials, videos and promotional films. In 2004, she and Elma Tataragic founded the production company MAMAFILM.

Her feature debut, Snow, won the 2008 Grand Prix at Cannes’ Critics’ Week and in 2012, she returned to the festival with Children of Sarajevo emerging winner of a Special Distinction in Un Certain Regard. She also shot segments of the portmanteau films Do Not Forget Me Istanbul (2010) and Bridges of Sarajevo (2014), the latter of which premiered in Cannes as a Special Screening. Her last feature film was 2017’s Never Leave Me.

In 2025, Begić was appointed the jury member at the 31st Sarajevo Film Festival for CineLink Female Voices award.

== Filmography ==
- Snow (Snijeg, 2008)
- Do Not Forget Me Istanbul (2011)
- Children of Sarajevo (Djeca, 2012)
- Bridges of Sarajevo (2014)
- Never Leave Me (2017)
