= Jasmila Žbanić =

Bosnian filmmaker (born 1974)

Jasmila Žbanić Јасмила Жбанић
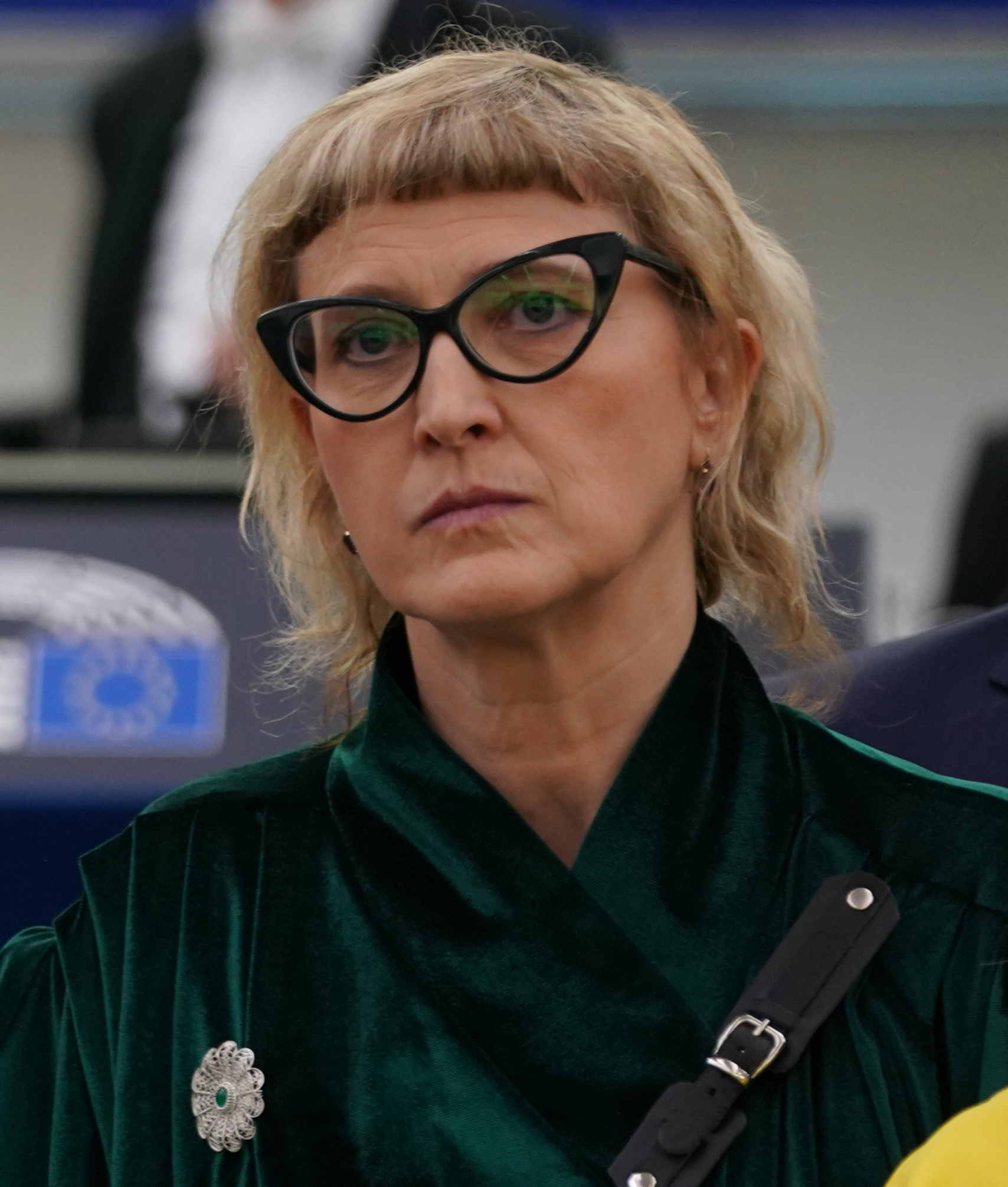
- Žbanić receiving the 2022 Lux Prize
- Born: 19 December 1974 (age 51); Sarajevo, SR Bosnia and Herzegovina, SFR Yugoslavia
- Occupations: Film director; screenwriter; producer
- Years active: 1998–present
- Spouse: Damir Ibrahimović (died)
- Children: 1

Jasmila Žbanić (Serbo-Croatian Cyrillic: Јасмила Жбанић, Bosnian pronunciation: [jasmǐla ʒbǎːnitɕ]; born 19 December 1974) is a Bosnian film director, screenwriter and producer. She has received numerous accolades, including nominations for the Academy Award and two BAFTA Awards. Žbanić has also won the Golden Bear at the Berlin Film Festival and has been nominated for the Golden Lion at the Venice Film Festival.

She is known for writing and directing the 2020 war drama film Quo Vadis, Aida?, which earned her nominations for the Academy Award for Best Foreign Language Film, the BAFTA Award for Best Film Not in the English Language and the BAFTA Award for Best Direction.

== Early life ==
Žbanić was born in Sarajevo on 19 December 1974 into a Bosniak family. Žbanić went to local schools before attending the Academy of Performing Arts in Sarajevo, where she got a degree. She worked for a time in the United States as a puppeteer in the Vermont-based Bread and Puppet Theater and as a clown in a Lee De Long workshop. In 1997, she founded the artist's association "Deblokada" alongside her husband Damir Ibrahimović, and started making documentaries and short films.

== Career ==
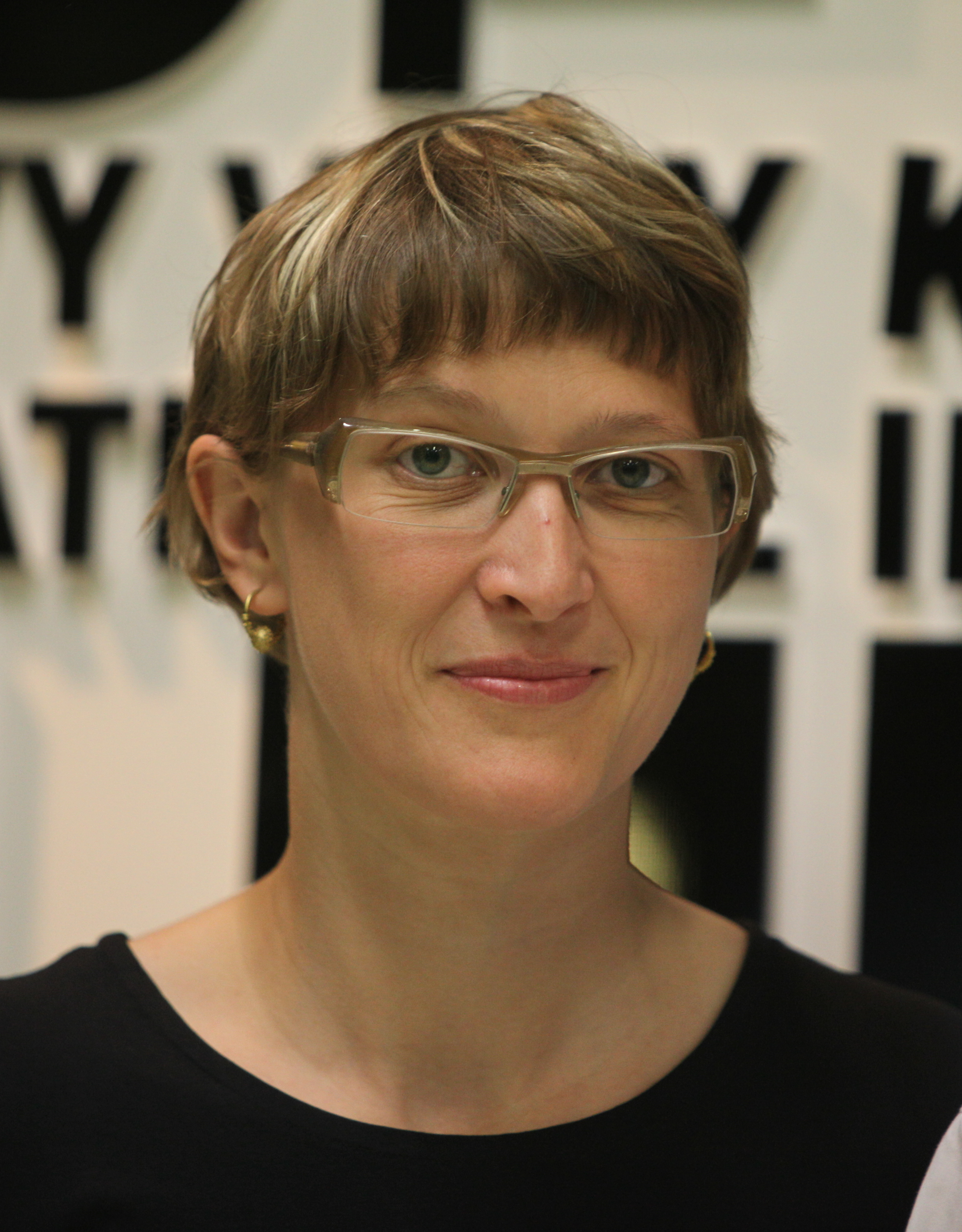
Žbanić at the 45th KVIFF in 2010

After her return to Bosnia and Herzegovina, she founded the artists' association "Deblokada" (meaning "de-blocking.") Through Deblokada, Žbanić wrote and produced many documentaries, video artworks, and short films. Her work has been seen around the globe, screened in film festivals and shown at exhibitions such as the Manifesta 3 in Slovenia in 2000, the Kunsthalle Fridericianum in Kassel in 2004, and the Istanbul Biennale in 2003. Since then she has made well-received feature films.

Her 2006 feature film Grbavica, won the Golden Bear at the 56th Berlin International Film Festival, the Grand Jury Prize at the International Feature Competition Festival in 2006, and was awarded the Best European Film and best European actress award in 2006. Her 2010 film Na putu (On the Path), which explores the relationship of a young couple living in Sarajevo, was screened at the 60th Berlin International Film Festival.

Žbanić's 2020 war drama film Quo Vadis, Aida? won the Audience Award at the 50th International Film Festival Rotterdam, the Best International Film Award at the 2021 Gothenburg Film Festival, entered into the 77th Venice International Film Festival and also won the Best International Film Award at the 36th Independent Spirit Awards. Further more, in March 2021, the film was nominated for Best Film Not in the English Language and Žbanić was nominated for Best Director at the 74th British Academy Film Awards. On 15 March 2021, Žbanić's film was nominated for Best International Feature Film at the 93rd Academy Awards. At the 34th European Film Awards held in December 2021, Quo Vadis, Aida? won the Award for Best Film. Also, Žbanić won the Award for Best Director and cast member Jasna Đuričić won the Award for Best Actress at the same awards.

== Themes and characters ==
Žbanić acknowledges that her films deal chiefly with the people of Bosnia and Herzegovina. She says that she uses film to explore problems and issues relating to her life. Žbanić strives to create characters that are not just "black and white," as real people are not that simple. She does not create characters who are strict saints and heroes, but who might be weak and also brave and tolerant. In 2017, Žbanić signed the Declaration on the Common Language of the Croats, Serbs, Bosniaks and Montenegrins.

== Filmography ==
=== Feature films ===
Year	English title	Original title	Director	Writer	Producer	Notes
1995	Autobiografija		Yes	Yes	No	
1997	Poslije, poslije		Yes	Yes	No	
1998	Noć je, mi svijetlimo		Yes	Yes	Yes	
1998	Ljubav je...		Yes	Yes	No	
2000	Red Rubber Boots	Crvene gumene čizme	Yes	Yes	Yes	
2003	Sjećaš li se Sarajeva		Yes	Yes	No	
2003	Images from the Corner	Slike s ugla	Yes	Yes	No	
2004	Birthday		Yes	Yes	No	
2006	Grbavica		Yes	Yes	No	
2010	On the Path	Na putu	Yes	Yes	No	
2013	For Those Who Can Tell No Tales	Za one koji ne mogu da govore	Yes	Yes	Yes	
2014	Love Island		Yes	Yes	No	
2017	Men Don't Cry	Muškarci ne plaču	No	No	Yes	
2020	Quo Vadis, Aida?		Yes	Yes	Yes	
TBA	Quo Vadis, Aida? - The Missing Part	Quo Vadis, Aida? – Dio koji nedostaje	Yes	Yes	Yes	Post-production

=== Documentary ===
- 2015: One Day in Sarajevo (Jedan dan u Sarajevu)
- 2025: Blum: Masters of Their Own Destiny (Blum: Gospodari svoje budućnosti)

=== Television ===
Year	Television show	Episode/s	Director	Writer	Producer
2023	The Last of Us	"Kin"	Yes	No	No
2023	I Know Your Soul	6 episodes	Yes	Yes	Yes

== Accolades ==
Year	Association	Category	Work	Result	Ref.
1998	Sarajevo Film Festival	Special Prize	Noć je, mi svijetlimo	Won	
2003	ZagrebDox	Big Stamp	Images from the Corner	Won	
2006	Berlin International Film Festival	Golden Bear	Grbavica	Won	
2006	Berlin International Film Festival	Prize of the Ecumenical Jury	Grbavica	Won	
2006	Berlin International Film Festival	Peace Film Award	Grbavica	Won	
2006	Sarajevo Film Festival	Ivica Matić Award	Grbavica	Won	
2010	Berlin International Film Festival	Golden Bear	On the Path	Nominated	
2020	Venice International Film Festival	Golden Lion	Quo Vadis, Aida?	Nominated	
2021	International Film Festival Rotterdam	Audience Award	Quo Vadis, Aida?	Won	
2021	Gothenburg Film Festival	Best International Film Award	Quo Vadis, Aida?	Won	
2021	Independent Spirit Awards	Best International Film	Quo Vadis, Aida?	Won	
2021	British Academy Film Awards	Best Director	Quo Vadis, Aida?	Nominated	
2021	British Academy Film Awards	Best Film Not in the English Language	Quo Vadis, Aida?	Nominated	
2021	93rd Academy Awards	Best International Feature Film	Quo Vadis, Aida?	Nominated	
2021	European Film Awards	Best Film	Quo Vadis, Aida?	Won	
2021	European Film Awards	Best Director	Quo Vadis, Aida?	Won	
2021	European Film Awards	Best Screenwriter	Quo Vadis, Aida?	Nominated	
