= Open Stage Obala =

Theatre in Sarajevo, Bosnia and Herzegovina

Coordinates: 43.8569°N 18.4208°E

- Otvorena scena Obala
- Interactive map of Open Stage Obala
- Address: Obala Kulina bana 11, 71000; Sarajevo; Bosnia and Herzegovina
- Owner: Academy of Performing Arts, Sarajevo
- Capacity: 130

Construction
- Opened: 1984; 42 years ago
- Renovated: 1996, 2024

Website
- Official Website

Open Stage Obala (Bosnian: Otvorena scena Obala; Serbo-Croatian Cyrillic: Отворена сцена Обала) is an alternative theatre affiliated with the Academy of Performing Arts in Sarajevo, Bosnia and Herzegovina. It serves as both a teaching venue and a platform for presenting student projects from acting, directing, and dramaturgy exams, as well as hosting professional theater productions and film screenings.

== Founding and early years ==
The Academy of Performing Arts Sarajevo was established in December 1981, and by November 1984, Open Stage Obala had begun operations. According to the Academy’s 1985 regulations, Open Stage Obala was defined as a distinct work unit with an Artistic Council established to guide its programs. Acclaimed filmmaker and Sarajevo-native, Emir Kusturica, was appointed the first Artistic Director, with prominent council members including Miroslav Mandić, Mirza Idrizović, and Nikola Stojanović.

== Activities and productions ==
Open Stage Obala quickly became known as one of the most vibrant theater spaces in the former Yugoslavia, thanks to contributions from faculty, staff, and students. It hosted numerous notable performances, such as Audicija, Čudo u Šarganu, Ples 80-ih, Tetovirano pozorište, Mrešćenje šarana, and Divlje meso. Today, the Academy of Performing Arts has four departments—Acting, Directing, Production, and Dramaturgy, hence the scope of Open Stage Obala's activities has significantly expanded. Alongside student performances for directing and acting exams, Obala now also hosts screenings of ASU students’ films and public readings of student-written dramas.

The stage organizes concerts featuring alternative bands from across Europe, while seminars and workshops remain key aspects of Obala’s programming. Over the past 25 years, students have had the opportunity to learn from international guests and lecturers, including Mustafa Nadarević, Leos Carax, Jean-Luc Godard, Richard Gere, Susan Sontag, Bono Vox, Enki Bilal, Michael Cimino, Hanif Kureishi, Danis Tanović, and Jasmila Žbanić, among others. Many well-known figures in Bosnian theater and film began their careers on the Obala stage.

== Influential figures and legacy ==
Over the years, notable figures have shaped Obala, including Mladen Materić, Emir Kusturica, Miroslav “Ćiro” Mandić, and actors like Emir Hadžihafizbegović and Senad Bašić. The stage has provided a launchpad for numerous careers in Bosnian theater and film.

The current artistic director of Open Stage Obala is Almir Imširević, who continues the legacy of fostering artistic growth and collaboration within Sarajevo’s cultural landscape.
