= List of Lud, zbunjen, normalan characters =

Lud, zbunjen, normalan (Crazy, confused, normal) is a Bosnian television program that revolves around three generations of men: the grandfather, Izet who is Lud (crazy), the father Faruk, who is Zbunjen (confused) and the son Damir, who is Normalan (normal) and the interaction around their neighborhood with their co workers and friends. Later on in the series, Faruk leaves for Sweden, after which Damir's son Džebra, a student, becomes the normal one in the family. Izet stays crazy, while Damir is both crazy and confused.

== Ensemble cast ==
=== Overview ===
Character	Portrayed by													
Character	Portrayed by	1	2	3	4	5	6	7	8	9	10	11	12	13
Izet Fazlinović	Mustafa Nadarević	Main	Main	Main	Main	Main	Main	Main	Main	Main	Main	Main	Main	Main
Faruk Fazlinović	Senad Bašić	Main	Main	Main	Main	Main	Main	Main	Main	Main	Main			
Damir Fazlinović	Moamer Kasumović	Main	Main	Main	Main	Main	Main	Main	Main	Main	Main	Main	Main	Main
Džebra Fazlinović	Tarik Džinić											Main	Main	Main
Marija Šarafova	Tatjana Šojić	Main	Main	Main	Main	Main	Main	Main	Main	Main	Main	Main	Main	Main
Čombe	Miraj Grbić	Main	Main	Main	Main	Main						Main		
Samir Fazlinović	Emir Hadžihafizbegović	Guest		Main	Main	Main	Main	Main	Main	Main	Main	Main	Main	Main
Dino Mujkić	Milan Pavlović	Main	Main											
Šefika Rondić	Jasna Žalica	Main										Main	Main	Main

== Main characters ==
=== Izet Fazlinović ===
Izet Fazlinović
- First appearance: "Opća zabuna"
- Portrayed by: Mustafa Nadarević

In-universe information
- Gender: Male
- Occupation: Engineer (since season 5)
- Family: Grand grandfather
- Spouse: Ranka Fazlinović (deceased)
- Children: Faruk Fazlinović, Jelena Fazlinović
- Relatives: See list: Samir Fazlinovć (nephew), Damir Fazlinović (grandson), Muharem Fazlinović (father), Ranka Fazlinović (wife), Džebra Fazlinović (Grand grandson), Jelena Fazlinović (daughter), Ismet Fazlinović (brother)
- Nationality: Bosniak

Izet Fazlinović (Mustafa Nadarević) - Izet is a widower in his mid sixties, who was orphaned as a child. He is a staunch communist with Titoism leanings, as he always asks President Josip Broz Tito for help while looking at his picture, but is nonetheless greedy and unwilling to work for money, preferring to run scams. Izet often threatens to kill people "like rabbits" (which he did when he mistakenly believed that Damir was gay or when Faruk spilled his prized and highly alcohol, "Maksuzija" which is a rakija made in Popovo Polje by Izet's old war friend. It is revealed that Ante, Izet's provider of Maksuzija actually switches it out for a worse alcoholic drink, so that he can keep the Maksuzija for himself, and the other's he is providing) Izet is constantly yelling and browbeating everyone around him to great comic effect. In addition he makes outrageous claims (about his past love life and fighting the Germans during World War II (going as far as saying he was on the front lines), which occurred while he was an infant). He is considered the show's breakout character.

=== Faruk Fazlinović ===
Faruk Fazlinović
- First appearance: "Opća zabuna"
- Last appearance: "Bolje mrtav pijan, nego mrtav trijezan"
- Portrayed by: Senad Bašić

In-universe information
- Gender: Male
- Occupation: Music studio owner, producer and film director
- Family: Grandfather
- Spouse: Nevena Fazlinović
- Children: Damir Fazlinović
- Relatives: See list: Izet Fazlinović (father), Damir Fazlinović (son), Samir Fazlinovć (cousin), Muharem Fazlinović (grandfather), Nevena (wife), Džeme-Branko Fazlinović (Grandson), Jelena Fazlinović (stepsister), Ismet Fazlinović (uncle)
- Nationality: Half-Bosniak, Half-Serbian

Faruk Fazlinović (Senad Bašić) - Faruk is Izet's son and only child. He worked as a music producer and owned the fledgling studio where he worked, which lasted for a couple of seasons, but his studio was used for different purposes through the series (being used as a radio station as well as his TV Show studio). A running gag on the show was his tendency to sleep in very late. He had to contend with all his father's neuroses. He left the family in the 265th episode, going to Sweden (although it was confirmed that the character left the show due to complications with the script).
