= Žalica (surname) =

Žalica is a surname. Notable people with the surname include:

- Antonije Žalica (born 1959), Bosnian writer and poet
- Jasna Žalica (born 1968), Bosnian actress
- Pjer Žalica (born 1964), Bosnian film director, screenwriter, and professor
