= Nada Đurevska =

Bosnian actress (1952–2017)

- Đurevska photographed in 2013 for the Sarajevo Film Festival
- Born: 8 January 1952; Skopje, PR Macedonia, FPR Yugoslavia
- Died: 13 September 2017 (aged 65); Sarajevo, Bosnia and Herzegovina
- Education: Faculty of Humanities, University of Sarajevo
- Occupation: Actress
- Years active: 1979–2015
- Spouse: Miroslav Avram

Nada Đurevska (8 January 1952 – 13 September 2017) was a Bosnian theater, television, and film actress, and a principal actress of the Drama department at the Sarajevo National Theatre.

== Biography ==
Born in Skopje on 8 January 1952, Đurevska moved to Sarajevo as a child in 1958, where she later completed her primary and secondary medical education before enrolling in acting studies. She graduated from the Department of Performing Arts at the Sarajevo Faculty of Humanities in 1979; her professional stage debut was as Varya in Chekhov's The Cherry Orchard.

Throughout her career, Đurevska was associated with the Kamerni teatar 55 (1974–1979) and subsequently became a member of the Sarajevo National Theatre. Even during the siege of Sarajevo, she remained an active performer on local stages.

Her best known role was in TV series Viza za budućnost (2002–2008), while her other notable roles include Miris dunja (1982), Hasanaginica (1983), and Igmanski marš (1983). She was a recipient of the Golden Arena for Best Supporting Actress at the Pula Film Festival for her role in the film Od zlata jabuka (1986), and Best Actress in the film Obrana i zaštita (2013). In 1989, she received the Sarajevo City SIZ Award. She was also awarded the Golden Laurel Wreath for her contribution to theater art at MESS 2002 and the Sixth April Award of the City of Sarajevo in 2014. Upon receiving the Sixth April Award, she announced her retirement from the stage after 40 years of work.

Đurevska died on 13 September 2017 in Sarajevo, following a long illness.

== Filmography ==
=== Film ===
- Izvor - Zagorka (1978)
- Okuka - Marija (1978)
- Krojač za žene (1980)
- Ćilim (1980)
- Zajedno (1981)
- Miris dunja - Azra (1982)
- Nastojanje - Majka (1982)
- Hasanaginica - Hasanaginica (1983)
- Vatrogasac - Žena (1983)
- Igmanski marš - Crnogorka (1983)
- Nije čovjek ko ne umre (1984)
- Provincija u pozadini (1984)
- Srebrena lisica - Mici (1985)
- Od zlata jabuka - Stamena (1986)
- Štrajk u tkaonici ćilima (1986)
- Strategija Svrake (1987)
- Moj brat Aleksa - Majka Mara Šantić (1991)
- Mliječni put - Fata (2000)
- Viza za budućnost - Mubera Polovina-Gaćo (2002–2008)
- Kod amidže Idriza - Begzada (2004)
- Dobro uštimani mrtvaci - Marija (2005)
- Nebo iznad krajolika - Majka (2006)
- Grbavica - Aunt Safija (2006)
- Slunjska brda - život ili smrt - Fatima (2006)
- I ja tebi... (2009)
- Jasmina - Safa (2010)
- Obrana i zaštita - Milena (2013)
- Imena višnje - Kata (2015; final role)

=== Television ===
- Djetinjstvo mladosti (1979)
- Tale - Vida (1979)
- Priče iz fabrike - Tereza Kovačić (1985)
- Ranjenik (1989)
- Strategija svrake (1990)
- Aleksa Šantić - Majka Mara Šantić (1992)
- Moomin - Moominmamma (voice) (1997)
- Viza za budućnost - Mubera Polovina Gaćo (2002–2008)
- Žene s broja 13 - više uloga / režiserka (2009)
- Kućni ljubimci - Mama (2009–2010)
- Foliranti - La Mama (2011–2012)
