= Fuse (film) =

2003 film

- Directed by: Pjer Žalica
- Written by: Pjer Žalica
- Produced by: Ademir Kenović
- Starring: Enis Bešlagić; Bogdan Diklić; Saša Petrović; Izudin Bajrović; Emir Hadžihafizbegović; Jasna Žalica
- Cinematography: Mirsad Herović
- Edited by: Almir Kenović
- Music by: Saša Lošić
- Release dates: 11 August 2003 (Locarno Film Festival); 28 April 2004
- Running time: 105 minutes
- Countries: Bosnia and Herzegovina
- Languages: Bosnian, Serbian, English

Fuse (Bosnian: Gori vatra, lit. 'The Fire Is Burning') is a Bosnian-Herzegovinian comedy/drama film directed by Pjer Žalica. It was released in 2003.

== Synopsis ==
The plot takes place in the small town of Tešanj in the Federation of Bosnia and Herzegovina, two years after the Bosnian War. The town is overridden by corruption, prostitution and organized crime. People of Tešanj live in peace, though the war scars are visible everywhere in town, as well as in people's souls. After the war, the population of Tešanj consists almost exclusively of Bosniaks. Ethnic Serbs now live in surrounding villages.

It is announced that U.S. president Bill Clinton will pay a visit to the town. Western bureaucrats arrive to Tešanj to supervise the preparations for the visit. Everything in the town must be in order, including the faked brotherhood between Bosniaks and Serbs.

== Cast ==
- Enis Bešlagić as Faruk
- Bogdan Diklić as Zaim
- Saša Petrović as Husnija
- Izudin Bajrović as Mugdim
- Emir Hadžihafizbegović as Stanko
- Jasna Žalica as Hitka
- Senad Bašić as Velija
- Feđa Štukan as Adnan
- Hubert Kramar as Supervisor
- Admir Glamočak as Hamdo
- Aleksandar Seksan as Pic
- Almir Čehajić as Osman
- Alban Ukaj as Glavar

== Soundtrack ==
Bosnian folk singer Emina Zečaj recorded music for the film.

== Music ==
The music and original background score for Identity were composed by Jakes Bejoy. The same year, the film's soundtrack album, titled "Gori Vatra", was released. The album included 2 Turkish songs. The songs "Yazık Oldu" and "Özledim", whose lyrics were written by Aylin Atalay, were sung in Turkish by Candan Erçetin. The lyrics and music of the other songs in the album belong to Saša Lošić. Erçetin rerecorded the opening track "Iznad Tešnja zora sviće" in Turkish for her 2004 studio album Melek.

Gori Vatra

Soundtrack album by Saša Lošić
- Released: 2003
- Genre: Feature film soundtrack
- Length: 55:02
- Languages: Bosnian, English, Turkish
- Label: Refresh Production

Track listing

No.	Title	Writer(s)	Singer(s)	Length
1.	"Iznad Tešnja Zora Sviće"	Saša Lošić	Jasna Žalica	4:29
2.	"Suada Fuse"		Šerif Konjević	3:33
3.	"Budio"		Fikret Delić Gugo]	5:11
4.	"Rudnik"	Saša Lošić		1:55
5.	"Guarda Che Luna"		Jasna Žalica, Sabahudin Kurt	4:11
6.	"Sada Mi Se Javljaš Mila"	Saša Lošić	Mustafa Šantić	4:35
7.	"Özledim"	Aylin Atalay	Candan Erçetin	4:06
8.	"Hitka"	Saša Lošić	Asena Pljevljak	4:24
9.	"Io Sono Di Piu"		Fikret Delić Gugo	3:23
11.	"I Feel So Good"		Saša Lošić
12.	"Yazık Oldu"	Aylin Atalay	Candan Erçetin	5:12
13.	"Gori Vatra (Glavna Tema)"		Adema Pljevljak	3:12
14.	"Iznad Tešnja Zora Sviće, Dobro Doš'o Predsjedniče"		Fikret Delić Gugo	4:58
15.	"Odlazim (Instrumental)"			4:02
16.	"Amra"			0:38
17.	"Kraj Potoka"			4:55
Total length:				55:02

== Awards ==
- Silver Leopard, Locarno International Film Festival - 2003
- Golden Star, Marrakech International Film Festival - 2003
- Best First Feature, Sarajevo Film Festival - 2003
