= Zehra Kreho =

Bosnian dramaturgist and academic

- Born: 17 August 1954 (age 72); Travnik, PR Bosnia and Herzegovina, FNR Yugoslavia
- Education: University of Sarajevo (AB); University of Belgrade (MA); University of Zagreb (PhD); Columbia University (Postdoc)
- Occupations: Dramaturgist, academic
- Years active: 1975–present
- Spouse: Senad Dautović

Zehra Kreho (born 17 August 1954) is a Bosnian dramaturge, dramaturgist, literary theorist, university professor and public intellectual.

== Life and career ==
=== Early life ===
Kreho was born on 17 August 1954, in Travnik, PR Bosnia and Herzegovina, then part of FPR Yugoslavia, into a family of Yugoslav diplomats. She spent her early childhood in Nairobi, Kenya, and Addis Ababa, Ethiopia, where her father was stationed at the Yugoslav embassy, completing her primary education in both cities. After returning to Yugoslavia, she enrolled at the prestigious First Sarajevo Gymnasium (Serbo-Croatian: Prva Sarajevska gimnazija), the oldest secondary school in Bosnia and Herzegovina whose alumni include novelist and Nobel Prize laureate Ivo Andrić and chemist and Nobel Prize laureate Vladimir Prelog.

=== Education ===
In 1974, Kreho graduated with degrees in Comparative Literature and Dramaturgy from the Faculty of Philosophy at the University of Sarajevo, specializing in Comparative Literature and Theatre Studies. She went on to earn a master’s degree in Dramatic Arts in 1978 from the Academy of Dramatic Arts in Belgrade, receiving the title of Master of Science in Dramaturgy. In 1981, Kreho completed her PhD in Humanities with a focus on Dramaturgy at the Faculty of Philosophy at the University of Zagreb, obtaining the title of Doctor of Science. In 1982, she was awarded a Fulbright Scholarship for postdoctoral studies at Columbia University in New York. From 1983 to 1986, Kreho continued her postdoctoral work at Columbia University on multiple occasions, receiving two extensions at the university’s request. During this period, she served as an assistant to Professor Eric Bentley in the field of Dramaturgy.

=== Academic career ===
She played an active role in establishing the Department of Dramaturgy at the Academy of Performing Arts in Sarajevo, alongside Prof. Dr. Razija Lagumdžija and the then-dean of the Academy. After its founding, she took an active part in implementing the department’s curriculum. From July 1993 to December 1998, she served as an assistant professor at the Academy of Performing Arts in Sarajevo. From December 1998 to December 2002, she held the position of associate professor, and since December 2002, she has been a full professor at the Academy.

Between 1999 and 2003, she also served as vice-dean and was a permanent member of the Senate of the University of Sarajevo during this time. From 2007 to 2011, she was a member of the Board of Directors of the Academy of Performing Arts.

On two occasions, she was a guest of the U.S. government, most recently in 1997, participating in the U.S. Department of State’s program on regional theatre. During this period, she delivered lectures at the University of Colorado Boulder, specializing in Shakespeare studies, as well as at the University of Phoenix, Arizona, Seattle University, and Georgetown University in Washington, D.C. At the invitation of Columbia University, she extended her stay to offer a course on the works of William Shakespeare.

=== Theatre career ===
From 1975 to 1993, she worked as a dramaturge at the Sarajevo National Theatre. During her tenure, she contributed to over one hundred productions, for which she received numerous awards in Yugoslavia.

Between 1972 and 1974, she was a British government scholarship recipient in the field of dramaturgy and participated in drama workshops with the Royal Shakespeare Company in Stratford-upon-Avon, UK.

=== Humanitarian work ===
She served as the Executive Director of the English humanitarian organization Mary Stopes International, where she organized 18 support centers for women traumatized by war, initially in Sarajevo and later in occupied areas following the cessation of hostilities. As the first representative of this organization in Bosnia and Herzegovina, she managed a team of 232 employees, including 173 qualified psychologists. Mary Stopes International recognized her as the most successful director among all its global branches in 1996. She held this leadership position until the organization withdrew from Bosnia and Herzegovina.

In 1993, she received the American Helsinki Watch Award for Freedom of Expression for an article published in The New Yorker titled “A Banquet in Bosnia.”
