= Zana Marjanović =

Bosnian actress (born 1983)

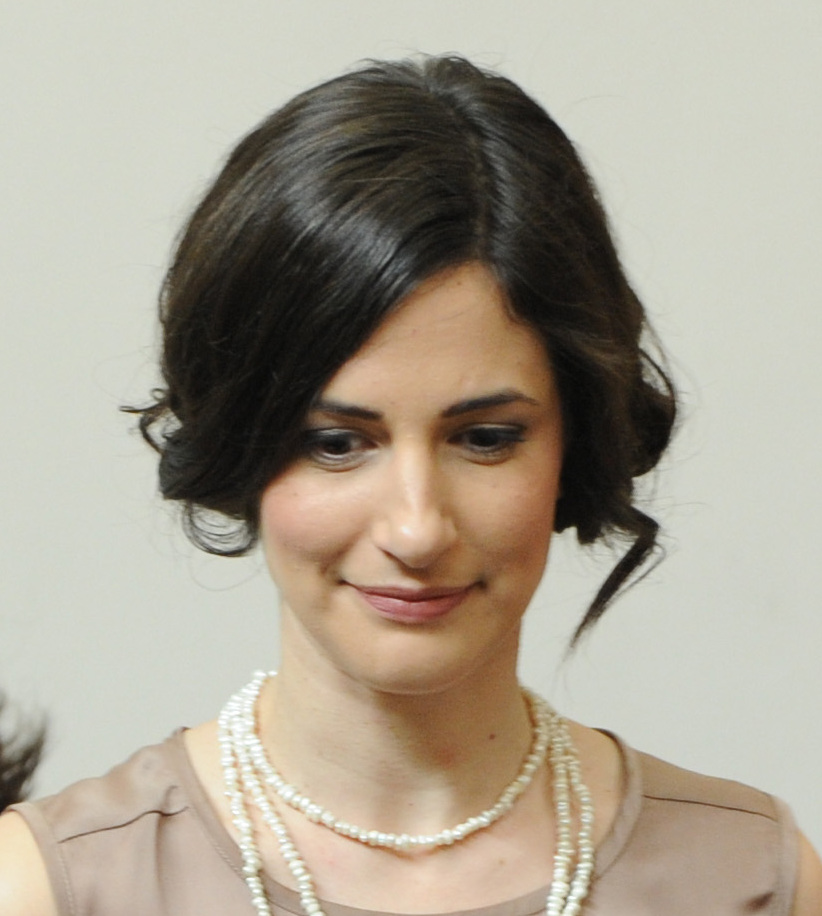
- Zana Marjanović (2012)
- Born: 31 May 1983 (age 43); Sarajevo, SR Bosnia and Herzegovina, Yugoslavia
- Occupation: Actress
- Years active: 2003–present

Zana Marjanović (born 31 May 1983) is a Bosnian actress best known for her leading role in Angelina Jolie's directorial debut In the Land of Blood and Honey (2011). She is an alumna of Academy of Performing Arts in Sarajevo.

== Filmography ==
Films

- Ljeto u zlatnoj dolini (Summer in the Golden Valley, 2003)
- Teško je biti fin (It's Hard to be Nice, 2007)
- Snijeg (Snow, 2008)
- Snovi (Dreams, 2008)
- Transfer (2010)
- In the Land of Blood and Honey (2011)
- Broken (2012)
- A Rose in Winter (2018)
- When Santa Was a Communist (2024)

Television

- Crna hronika (Black Chronicle, 2004)
- Lud, zbunjen, normalan (Crazy, Confused, Normal, 2007–10); recurring role in 29 episodes
- 60 Minutes (2011)
- This Week (2011)
- Tavis Smiley (2011–12); 2 episodes
- Charlie Rose (2011)
- Priče iza diskrecione linije (Stories Behind the Line of Discretion, 2012)
- New Year's Eve with Magacin Kabare (2012)
- The Game (2014)

Shorts

- Prva plata (Paycheck, 2005)
