= A Stranger =

- Theatrical release poster
- Obrana i zaštita
- Directed by: Bobo Jelčić
- Screenplay by: Bobo Jelčić
- Produced by: Zdenka Gold, Tomislav Bubalo, Tomislav Topic, Josip Popovac, Mislav Brumec
- Starring: Bogdan Diklić; Nada Đurevska
- Cinematography: Erol Zubčević
- Production companies: Croatian Radiotelevision; Kvadar; Spiritus Movens
- Release date: 9 February 2013 (BIFF)
- Running time: 87 minutes
- Country: Croatia
- Languages: Croatian; Serbian

A Stranger (Croatian: Obrana i zaštita; lit. 'Defence and Protection') is a 2013 Croatian drama film directed by Bobo Jelčić.

== Cast ==
- Bogdan Diklić — Slavko
- Nada Đurevska — Milena
- Ivana Roščić — Zehra
- Rakan Rushaidat — Krešo
- Vinko Kraljević — Milan
- Selma Alispahić — Doorkeeper
- Sadžida Šetić — Neighbour
- Sergej Trifunović — Whiskey Smuggler
- Snježana Martinović — Secretary

== Awards ==
A Stranger won seven Golden Arena awards at the 2013 Pula Film Festival: Best Film, Best Director, Best Actor, Best Actress, Best Screenplay, Best Production Design and Best Cinematography. Also, it won Special Jury Prize at 2013 Sarajevo Film Festival.
