= Almir Čehajić =

Bosnian talk show host and actor

Almir Čehajić Batko
- Born: 27 September 1962 (age 63)
- Occupations: Talk show host, actor
- Known for: Udri muški

Almir Čehajić, also known as Batko, is a Bosnian talk show host and actor. He is the host of the radio programme Udri muški which encourages viewers to donate money to help the programme's guests fund medical procedures.

Formerly a dentist, Čehajić was inspired to start the programme when his daughter died because he did not have the funds for her heart surgery. He decided to start Udri muški to help other people in the same situation. Since its debut in 1999, Udri muški has funded medical treatment and provided financial assistance for over 8,000 people. In 2010, Čehajić was awarded the Humanitarian Award from the International League of Humanists in recognition of his efforts.

As an actor, Čehajić has appeared in the television series Lud, zbunjen, normalan and Pjer Žalica's film Fuse.

SIPA arrested him in October 2020 as he was accused of money laundering. He was parole-released from detention on 18 November 2020.

== Filmography ==
- 2008–10 Lud, zbunjen, normalan - Batko/Reditelj (TV)
- 2007 Estrellita - Man with a barrel
- 2007 Cimmer fraj - Kemal Memovic Kemo (TV)
- 2006 Skies Above the Landscape
- 2005 Paycheck (short film)
- 2004 Crna hronika (TV)
- 2003 Summer in the Golden Valley - Man buying flat
- 2003 Fuse - Osman

== Awards and honors ==
- 2010 Humanitarian Award from the International League of Humanists
