= Snježana Martinović =

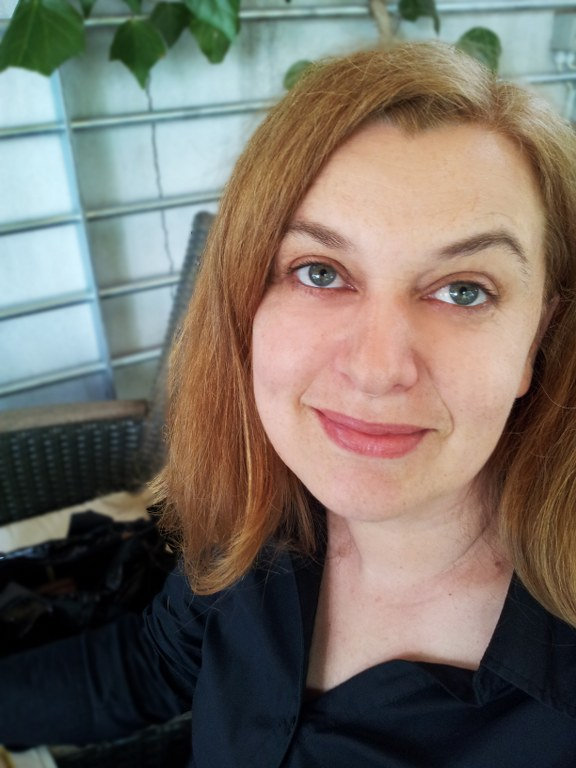
- Martinović in 2013
- Born: 11 June 1967 (age 57); Mostar, Socialist Republic of Bosnia and Herzegovina, SFR Yugoslavia
- Education: Academy of Performing Arts in Sarajevo
- Occupation(s): Actor, director, professor
- Years active: 1985–present
- Website: www.snjezanamartinovic.com

Snježana Martinović (born 11 June 1967) is an actress who has appeared in Bosnian-Herzegovinan, Croatian, French, German, Italian and Slovenian films and theatre productions.

== Film ==
Film
Year	Title	Role
1988	Vizantija (Byzantium)	
1988	Azra	Ana
1990; 2007	Belle epoque, ili poslednji valcer u Sarajevu (Belle Epoque, or the Last Waltz in Sarajevo)	Jovanka Čabrinović
1991	Praznik u Sarajevu (Holiday in Sarajevo)	Sabina Sestic
2013	Obrana i zaštita (A Stranger)	Secretary

== Theatre ==
Sarajevo National Theatre
Year	Title	Role	Director
1987	Hasanaginica (The Hasanaginica)	Robinjica	Boro Stjepanović
1988	Sluškinje (The Servant-girls)	Gospodarica	Boro Stjepanović
1989	A Midsummer Night's Dream	Helena^{[a]}	Drago Boldin
1989	Zašto (Why)	^{[b]}	Snježana Martinović
1990	Mjesečeva predstava (The Moon's Performance)	Livija^{[c]}	Mladen Materić
1990	Demoni (The Demons)	Jena	[cast]^{[d]}
1991	Ludi od ljubavi (Fool For Love)	Mey	Snježana Martinović^{[e]}
1991	Romeo and Juliet	Juliet	Pjer Žalica

[a] guest performance in the Novi Sad Festival
[b] examination performance, presented by the Sarajevo Academy of Performing Arts at an international meeting of the Performing Arts Academies of Poland, Slovenia, Croatia and Bosnia-Herzegovina, on the topic of stage composition
[c] guest performances in cities including Lyon, Paris, Skopje, and Toulouse
[d] direction mentor: A. Glamočak
[e] direction mentor: Mladen Materić

Performances at other theatres
Year	Venue	Title	Role	Director
1991	National Theatre Mostar	Zločin na kozijem otoku (Crime on the Goat Island)	Pia	[cast]
1994	Theaterhaus Stuttgart	Bosnien, hungrig und nackt, Trunken von Schlaf (Bosnia, Hungry And Naked, Drunk of Sleeping)		Werner Schretzmeier
1995	Theaterhaus Stuttgart	Dirty Dishes	Diana	Werner Schretzmeier
1995	Théâtre Prémol a Grenoble	Les oiseaux de Vratnik (The Birds of Vratnik)^{[f]}	Maria	Gojko Bjelac
1996	Telo Tanz Studio Stuttgart	Die Schneekonigin (The Ice Maiden)^{[g]}		
1998	Croatian National Theatre in Mostar	Fernando Krapp mi je napisao ovo pismo (Fernando Krapp Wrote Me This Letter)	Julija	Robert Raponja
1999	Croatian National Theatre in Mostar	SOS Centrala (The SOS Central)	[assistant director]	
1999	Sarajevo National Theatre – MES 1999	La strada (The Road)	Gelsomine	Gojko Bjelac
2001	Plesni studio Ljubljana – društvo B51 Slovenija (Dancing Studio of Ljubljana – B51 Association)	Simultan	Ona	Maruša Oblak
2001	Gledališče Koper (Koper Theatre, Slovenia)	Enajsta šola (The Eleventh School)	Cesarica I, Elizabeta, Cesarica II	Katja Pegan
2008	Mostar Youth Theatre	Jelinek's Jackie^{[h]}		Snježana Martinović
2009	Kazališne igre festival in Jajce	Njegove tri sestre (Chekhov's Three Sisters)	Olga^{[i]}	Scott Fielding
2012	Croatian National Theatre in Mostar	Nigdje nikog nemam (Have I none)	Sara	Dragan Komadina
2015	Puppet Theatre Mostar	Murlin Murlo		Snježana Martinović

[f] the play selected for Grenoble's 12th Festival of Theatre Europeen 1996
[g] choreography by Ursula Bischoff
[h] play by Nobel laureate Elfriede Jelinek, based on the life of Jackie Kennedy
[i] Martinović won an award for this performance (see below)

Martinović has also been involved in theatre productions at Associazione Juliet, Muggia, and at Open Stage Obala, Sarajevo.

== Other work ==
As of April 2015, Martinović was teaching film and theatre courses at United World College in Mostar, Bosnia and Herzegovina. She has previously taught at Mostarskoj Dramskoj Akademiji (Drama Academy of Mostar).

== Awards ==
- 2010 Award for the best actress in BiH (character Olga, Njegove tri sestre, director Scott Fielding) during the Kazališne igre festival in Jajce.
- 2007 Award for the best film (Belle epoque, director Nikola Stojanović, character Jovanka) at a festival in Novi Sad, Serbia
- 2007 Award Mravac for the best actress (character Jackie, director Snježana Martinović – independent project) on festival author poetics in Mostar, BiH
