= Lud, zbunjen, normalan =

Bosnian television sitcom (2007–2021)

- Created by: Feđa Isović; Elmir Jukić
- Written by: Feđa Isović
- Directed by: Elmir Jukić
- Starring: Mustafa Nadarević; Senad Bašić; Moamer Kasumović; Tarik Džinić
- Theme music composer: Dino Šukalo; Dino Šaran
- Composers: Dino Šukalo; Dino Šaran; Almir Kurt; Nedim Babović
- Country of origin: Bosnia and Herzegovina
- Original language: Bosnian
- No. of seasons: 13
- No. of episodes: 309 (list of episodes)

Production
- Executive producers: Lana Marlović; Fokus d.o.o. Rovinj; Vanja Pušić
- Producers: Davor Pušić; Nebojša Garić (Season 1-5)
- Production locations: Sarajevo, Bosnia and Herzegovina
- Cinematography: Milenko Uherka; Almir Đikoli
- Editor: Elvedin Zorlak
- Running time: 30–40 minutes
- Production company: FIST d.o.o. Sarajevo

Original release
- Network: FTV (2007–2013); Nova TV (2007–2021); Prva TV (2015–2016); Nova BH (2016–2021); RTS; B92; A1 TV; Kanal 5 POP TV; Vijesti; Face TV
- Release: 2 September 2007 – 10 November 2021

Lud, zbunjen, normalan (transl. The Crazy, The Confused, The Normal) is a Bosnian television sitcom created by Feđa Isović and Elmir Jukić, which aired primarily on FTV and Nova TV from 2 September 2007 to 10 November 2021, lasting thirteen seasons. Since its debut, it was also shown throughout all the countries of the former Yugoslavia. With an ensemble cast starring Mustafa Nadarević, Senad Bašić, Moamer Kasumović and later Tarik Džinić, the show revolves around the daily lives and struggles of the Fazlinović family.

Lud, zbunjen, normalan received acclaim throughout its run, becoming one of the most popular and most watched television shows in both Bosnia and Herzegovina and the former Yugoslavia.

== Premise ==
The show stars three generations of the Fazlinović family, all living in an apartment in Sarajevo. The oldest of the family is Izet Fazlinović (Mustafa Nadarević). Izet has a son Faruk (Senad Bašić), who in turn has a son Damir (Moamer Kasumović). In season four, Damir's son Džebra (Bilal Hadžić; Ivor Šparavalo; Tarik Džinić) is born. The show's title refers to the three main characters, with Izet being Lud (The Nut/Crazy), Faruk being Zbunjen (The Confused) and Damir being Normalan (The Regular). The show's plot revolves around humorous situations involving the Fazlinović clan, their friends and co-workers.

Later on in the series, Faruk leaves for Sweden, after which Damir's son Džebra, a student, becomes the normal one in the family. Izet stays crazy, while Damir becomes confused.

== Cast and characters ==
Lud zbunjen normalan employs an ensemble cast. Three generations, later on four, of the Fazlinović family all live in a Sarajevo apartment. The oldest of the family is Izet Fazlinović (Mustafa Nadarević). Izet has a son Faruk (Senad Bašić) who has a son Damir (Moamer Kasumović) and he has a son Džebra (Tarik Džinić). The show's title referred to the three main characters, with Izet being Lud (crazy), Faruk being Zbunjen (confused) and Damir being Normalan (normal). The show's plot revolves around humorous situations involving the Fazlinović clan, their friends and co-workers. Later on in the series, Faruk leaves for Sweden and Džebra joins Izet and Damir as one of the three protagonists, becoming the normal one in the family. Izet stays crazy, while Damir becomes confused.

The series also featured a number of guest stars. The series featured Enis Bešlagić as Đenis Đenis, a rockstar; Samir Fazlinović, Izet's nephew from his late brother, played by Emir Hadžihafizbegović, who later was promoted to a regular on the show.

In addition, there are various Balkan singers that had a guest appearance on the show, such as: Al' Dino, a recording artist; Sejo Sexon (Davor Sučić - aka "Sejo Sexon"), member of the rock group "Zabranjeno Pušenje", who is good friends with Faruk; Tifa (Tifa); Nagib (Zlatan Zuhrić - Zuhra) who came to Faruk to record a song and Nina Badrić, came to Izet to record a song.

=== Protagonists ===
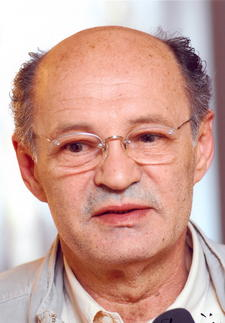
Mustafa Nadarević received widespread praise for his performance as Izet Fazlinović, and is considered as the show's breakout character

- Izet Fazlinović (Mustafa Nadarević) - Izet is a widower in his mid seventies, who was orphaned as a child. He is a staunch communist with Titoist leanings, as he always asks Tito for help while looking at his picture, but is nonetheless greedy and unwilling to work for money, preferring to run extortion schemes such as scams. Izet often threatens to kill people "like rabbits" (which he did when he mistakenly believed that Damir was gay or when Faruk spilled his prized and highly alcoholic Maksuzija rakija). Izet is constantly yelling and browbeating everyone around him to great comic effect. In addition, he makes outrageous claims (about his past love life and fighting the Germans during World War II, which occurred while he was an infant). He is considered the show's breakout character. The character is a parody of many of the elderly citizens of Bosnia and Herzegovina, most of whom are nostalgic about when Bosnia was a part of the SFR Yugoslavia.
- Faruk Fazlinović (Senad Bašić) - Faruk is Izet's son and only child. He works as a music producer and owns a fledgling studio where he works. The character parodies another stereotypical remnant of Yugoslav era as he represents the generation that was the urban youth revolving around Sarajevo's burgeoning rock scene, that is now on the brink of financial downfall in post-war Yugoslav societies where only turbo-folk musicians tend to be more well off. Faruk's involvement in the scene is often emphasized by celebrity appearances of rock musicians who all seem to know Faruk back then. A running gag on the show was his tendency to sleep all day, and stay up all night. He had to contend with all his father's neurotic browbeating. The actor left the series in 2016, and there were no new actors to replace him in season 11. His last appearance was in episode 264.
- Damir Fazlinović (Moamer Kasumović) - Damir is Faruk's son and only child as well as Izet's only grandchild. He was the result of a one night stand which occurred in the bathroom of the Cafe San Remo on its opening night in 1985. His mother abandoned him with the Fazlinović family and briefly returned in 2008. In spite of this he is the only normal and well balanced member of the family, as well as a medical student at the University of Sarajevo. He represents the country's youth, or more specifically students, caught in the grisly madness of conflicting social currents. A running gag on the show is his attempt to lead a normal life, in spite of his abnormal relatives.
- Džema Branko Fazlinović/Džebra (Bilal Hadžić (season 4); Ivor Šparavalo (seasons 5-10); Tarik Džinić (seasons 11 and 12)) - Džebra is Damir's and Barbara's son, Faruk's grandson and Izet's great-grandson. He dislikes school and first went to school with his great-grandfather, who unsuccessfully tried to pull him out after learning that one of his classes would be on religious studies. He has already outgrown his peers. Damir and Barbara originally wanted to name him Dražen, but Izet got involved, so he was named Džema Branko instead (after Yugoslavian communist leaders Džemal Bijedić and Branko Mikulić). He is referred to as Džebra, a mix of the names Džemal and Branko.

=== Other cast and characters ===
- Jelena Fazlinović-Janković (Katarina Marković) - She is Izet's daughter. Her mom was Izet's girlfriend and she was called Persida Janković. Jelena's mother died and Jelena comes to Sarajevo to find her father. She is a sexually active heavy drinker who's overly sassy like Izet, but sleeps in like her half-brother Faruk.
- Dragan Čmar/Zoran Čmar - "Čombe" (Miraj Grbić) - Čombe is an intellectually challenged (very dumb), albeit a nice and kind character. He has a lot of ideas, but they never end up going the right way. He is a passionate musician, but is a terrible guitarist and singer. For a long time, every episode would end with Čombe either terribly singing, or with him talking on senseless TV-shows or radio talk shows about the theme of the episode. He was initially called Dragan Čmar, but in an episode he changed his name to Zoran.
- Barbara Fazlinović (Marija Omaljev; Džana Pinjo) - Damir's ex-wife, who's an actress that puts her career first (but the fact is that she doesn't have a career). She is arrogant and self-centered, and doesn't care much about other people. The character is a parody of region's new go-getter youth. Her first appearance was in Episode Tripl Randevu as a seller in jewelry store.
- Samir Fazlinović (Emir Hadžihafizbegović) - Izet's nephew from his late brother, a notorious scam artist who always cheats the people he does business with. He is a parody of Bosnia's stereotypical unscrupulous micro-businessmen. A running gag on the show is the fact that every time that Izet, Faruk, Damir and later on Džebra do any business with him, they always get scammed.
- Šefika Rondić (Jasna Žalica) - Šefika is a maid who works for the Fazlinovic family. Her job is complicated by the family's dysfunctions, especially Izet's constant sexual harassment and attempts to lower her pay. She quits her job because of Izet's constant sexual harassment (off the show, the actress Žalica quit after her demand for higher pay was not met.) and was replaced by Rabija in the first episode of the second season. She comes back to the Fazlinović house in season 11, after a college-aged Džebra called for her.
- Enes Hadžiethemćumurović (Žan Marolt) - Enes is the Fazlinović's next door neighbor and a minister. The character is a parody of the numerous corrupt and smooth-talking politicians that exist in Bosnia and Herzegovina. His last name is also a parody of post-communist politicians in Bosnia, as it is very long and has obscure origins and religious overtones. He makes numerous references to an unnamed political party of which he is a senior member and whose president is "his really good friend, by the way". He frequently charges personal expenses to the party's accounts (such as the furniture in his home and presents he bought for Šefika, and later Rabija) and has ripped off the Fazlinović family on at least one occasion. The party also "helped" Enes to earn a law degree in 2007, though he rarely finds the time to practice law, unless one of the other characters ends up needing a lawyer, such as Stjepan and Izet. Enes had a romantic relationship with Šefika and, in the second season, with Rabija and he recruited Izet into his party in an attempt to lure elderly voters. The attempt backfired because of a sex scandal caused by Izet. Izet calls him dugonja (stretch) because of his tall stature. The actor died on 11. July 2009, and it was decided no new actors will replace him further on in the series. His last appearance was in episode 71.
- Dr. Điđimilović - (Vanja Drach) - Dr. Điđimilović is a psychiatrist and a longtime friend of Izet. The doctor is often called in by Izet to help with the family's problems which both medical and personal in nature. A running gag on the show is the fact that many of the medical problems that Dr. Điđimilović is called to treat are misdiagnosed prior to his arrival, so he ends up dispensing advice for a problem that does not exist, such as Faruk's drug addiction and Damir's impotence. The actor died on 6. September 2009, and it was decided no new actors will replace him further on in the series. His last appearance was in episode 72.
- Ivana (Gordana Boban) - A secretary at the music studio owned by Faruk. She more or less ran the studio. The actress left the series with her last appearance in episode 55, due to having issues with the way that controversial content was handled on the show. The character was said to have moved to Germany.
- Dino (Mehmeda) Mujkić (Milan Pavlović) - Sound technician at Faruk's studio, Akord. Obese and inept, he is often portrayed as stupid, even buying Izet's VW Beetle for 4,900 Bosnian Marks and paying 4,000 Marks to Samir for a driver's license which has someone else's name and photograph on it. The actor was killed off of the series, with his last appearance in episode 63. (It was due to the actor Pavlović having asked for higher pay and the showrunners not willing to agree to that.) In the first episode of season 3, it was revealed he died after overeating, and in the same episode was his funeral.
- Stjepan (Stipe) Mrvica (Saša Petrović) - Former owner of the Cafe San Remo, a popular hang out for the show's characters. He tried to sabotage San Remo with Samir, but it failed. His last appearance was in episode 69 explained by his fallout with his wife Marija.
- Marija Šarafova (Tatjana Šojić) - Stipe's former wife who also works at the cafe. After many years of marriage Marija schemed to divorce Stipe and take control of all his assets. To accomplish this, she enlists her lawyer/lover Mariofil, and recruits Enes to represent Stipe in the divorce proceeding with the agreement that he would lose the case.
- Selma (Zana Marjanović) - A waitress at the Cafe San Remo. After finishing college, she became the secretary at Faruk's studio after Ivana went to Germany.
- Rabija Bubić- "Rapka" (Belma Lizde-Kurt) - The family's new maid (from season 2), whom Izet handpicked himself. She's a very nice girl, albeit slightly ignorant due to her countryside upbringing, a great cook, and is a workaholic despite having a 300 Marks monthly wage. However, in episode 95, she quits her job after the old vacuum cleaner exploded, and as she always said, there is nothing that works in Izet's house, because he never gave her the money to buy any working equipment. (When in reality, the actress Lizde-Kurt quit the show due to needing some personal time off, after having suffered the loss of her son.)
- Dr. Đuro Ubiparip (Boro Stjepanović) - A gynecologist and Izet's long-time friend from Belgrade, who replaced Dr. Điđimilović when it came to partaking in Izet's weekly schemes and shenanigans, albeit with more concern for those who fell victim to them, when compared to his predecessor.
- Bećir Mrvica (Dragan Marinković) - A gay pop recording artist. He came from Zagreb to Sarajevo for personal reasons. His first appearance was in episode 78 (Season 3). He did not appear until Season 12. After a decade he returned from the Netherlands in Season 12. In the Netherlands he met his husband who died a few months before he returned to Bosnia, where he wanted to open a clinic in his honor.
- Mentor Kosova (Ilir Tafa) - Mentor Kosova is a Co-Owner of Faruk's Video Production, and a former owner of a Buregdžinica. He quit that business after happening to witness Dino's death by overeating. He's a Kosovar Albanian and a major patriot for Kosovo. He became very angry when Faruk compared a schnitzel that Mentor brought to him from Kosovo to Karađorđeva šnicla, and a salad from Kosovo to Shopska salad, due to the Serbian and Macedonian names of those dishes. Later in that episode, Mentor wanted to have a picture of Bill Clinton in Faruk's studio, due to Clinton's advocation for what was the NATO intervention during the Kosovo War.
- Zumreta Bubić- "Zumra" (Minka Muftić) - The family's third maid (from season 4), which replaced her younger sister Rabija. She is very primitive, and has a lack of knowledge towards common things and has a typical country accent. She was fired after peeling potatoes with a used shaving razor.
- Sanela (ex. Bandera) Hadžimuftezović (Elvira Aljukić) - The family's fourth maid (from season 5), who replaced Zumra. She's considered to be beautiful and sexy, and the family is always trying to take a look at her buttocks and her breasts. Her brother is a Sarajevo mafia member Pajser. Prior to working for the Fazlinović family, she first appeared in Episode 95, when she was brought to Studio Akord to record a song by one of her and Faruk's mutual friends, but through a series of unfortunate events, she ends up mistaking Faruk for Refko and had sexual relations with the latter, thinking he is Faruk.
- Milan Čmar-"Kufe" (Ljubomir Bandović) - Čombe's and Fufe's brother. He came to Sarajevo after having lived in the United States for years. He's pretty much exactly like Čombe and Fufe, except with a subtler nuance. He and Mentor Kosova quickly become friends, despite the conflict between the ethnic groups (Serbs and Albanians) in Kosovo. The character only appears in season 6. He appears in the other seasons only in flashbacks.

=== Recurring appearances ===
- Mariofil (Mirvad Kurić) Marija's second husband (from the fifth season ex-husband). A lawyer. First appearance in episode 52.
- Spomenka (Milena Dravić) Izet's neighbor and occasional lover.
- Senka (Seka Sablić) - Senka is house-sitting for her cousin Spomenka while the latter is out of the country. She is also involved with Izet.
- Ana (Halima Mušić) Izet's new girlfriend, after Senka and Spomenka left him.
- Alma (Irma Alimanović) - Damir's first girlfriend. Met her in a library in episode 2.
- Ines (Iva Šulentić) - Damir's Croatian ex-girlfriend.
- Mirna (Alma Terzić) - Damir's new girlfriend. She left him in episode 71 for a misunderstanding.
- Tanja (Slađana Bukejlović) - Faruk's ex-girlfriend.
- Senada Fukić-Fazlinović (Snežana Marković) - Faruk's new girlfriend, after he broke up with Tanja. Faruk married her. She left him.
- Đido Mova (Aleksandar Seksan) - An ineffective detective the characters often hire to spy on each other. A running gag is that when he answers phone calls, he introduces himself as Džido Mova (which is šatrovački for "come here") and people misunderstand him thinking that they have to come to him.
- Reufik (Mehmeda) Mujkić - "Refko" (Goran Navojec) - Dino's brother who used to live in Zagreb, but came to Sarajevo for Dino's funeral, and stayed in Sarajevo. He worked as a sound technician at Faruk's studio, and Čombe and he later had their own senseless nighttime radio show. The character was introduced in the first episode of season 3.

=== Episodic appearances ===
- Đenis Đenis (Enis Bešlagić) - He is a famous rockstar that came to Faruk two times to record a hit. Izet got involved and his plan failed.
- Stefanel (Mario Drmać) - A recording artist who came to Faruk once to record an album. He is also a hypochondriac.
- Ranka (Ana Mazalica) - Ranka is Izet's dead wife. She has her life savings known as "Crni Fond" (Black Savings) and they are hidden somewhere in the house.
- Nevena (Mediha Musliović) - Damir's mom that abandoned him when he was a baby.
- Mahmut (Emir Z. Kapetanović) - A wealthy religious musician who came to Faruk's studio to record some Muslim religious songs.
- Murga (Mirsad Tuka) - Police inspector.
- Nada (Vedrana Seksan) - Damir's professor in which both Faruk and Izet are in love with.

=== Celebrity appearances ===
- Hanka Paldum - Came to Faruk to record a song in Izet's dream.
- Nina Badrić - Came to Izet to record a song.
- Elvir Laković Laka - Came to Faruk to record a song.
- Mladen Vojičić Tifa as himself, came to Faruk to record a song.
- Sejo Sexon as himself. A member of the group "Zabranjeno Pušenje", he is good friends with Faruk in the series.
- Nagib (Zlatan Zuhrić - Zuhra) - Came to Faruk to record a song.
- Al Dino as himself.
- Deen - Came to Faruk to record an album.
- Rambo Amadeus as himself.

== Episodes ==
| Series | Episodes | Originally released | | |
| Series | Episodes | First released | Last released | Network |
|---|---|---|---|---|
| 1 | 40 | 2 September 2007 | 1 June 2008 | FTV |
| 2 | 32 | 7 September 2008 | 12 April 2009 | FTV |
| 3 | 24 | 1 January 2010 | 13 June 2010 | FTV |
| 4 | 24 | 2 January 2011 | 26 June 2011 | FTV |
| 5 | 24 | 29 January 2012 | 7 April 2013 | FTV |
| 6 | 24 | 3 November 2014 | 1 April 2015 | Nova TV |
| 7 | 24 | 5 April 2015 | 10 May 2015 | Nova TV |
| 8 | 24 | 15 May 2015 | 2 November 2015 | Nova TV |
| 9 | 24 | 3 November 2015 | 25 June 2016 | Nova TV |
| 10 | 24 | 26 June 2016 | 19 July 2016 | Nova TV |
| 11 | 24 | 17 February 2020 | 25 March 2020 | Nova TV |
| 12 | 12 | 26 March 2020 | 21 July 2021 | Nova TV |
| 13 | 9 | 10 September 2021 | 10 November 2021 | Nova TV |

== Development ==
The first episode of Lud, zbunjen, normalan aired on 2 September 2007. The first five episodes were produced as a pilot for Bosnian public broadcaster FTV, but after Croatian television station Nova TV joined to produce the show, the series was approved for a full season. Alongside producers Davor Pušić and Mirsad Herović, FTV General Manager Jasmin Duraković was also influential in the show's conception. He formed a cast which included Mustafa Nadarević and Senad Bašić. Meanwhile, Siniša Svilan directed the program. Nova TV commissioned the TV rights for Croatian territory and provided production for the first season, which had 40 episodes. The second season had 32 episodes, and seasons three and four each had 24 episodes. The fifth season, which aired in 2012, had 16 episodes and the season six had 9 episodes before the series was canceled by FTV. Ultimately the series was revived for a seventh season, which began airing on 3 November 2014.

In 2015, the Bosnian broadcaster changed to the commercial television Face TV and started broadcasting the seventh season regularly from 4 April 2015 at 8:00 PM.

In 2016, series screenwriter Feđa Isović stated that after 264 episodes, the series was supposed to end, but in 2018, Isović announced that 36 new episodes were planned. The 265th episode aired on 17 February 2020 on Nova BH, with Bašić leaving the series.

=== Cancellation ===
In April 2020, Isović announced that the series would continue after 300 episodes with at least three more seasons planned. However, filming of the series was stopped in March 2020 because of the COVID-19 pandemic, and the series was cancelled altogether after the death of main actor Mustafa Nadarević in November 2020.

Tarik Džinić, one of the main actors, has subsequently revealed that the series was supposed to end after 336 episodes.
