= Semka Sokolović-Bertok =

- Born: Semka Sokolović; 22 December 1935; Sarajevo, Kingdom of Yugoslavia
- Died: 4 March 2008 (aged 72); Zagreb, Croatia
- Resting place: Mirogoj Cemetery, Zagreb, Croatia
- Occupation: Actress
- Years active: 1956–2008
- Spouse: Mario Bertok
- Children: 1
- Family: Sokolović family

Semka Sokolović-Bertok (22 December 1935 – 4 March 2008) was a Bosnian and Croatian actress. She also was a competitive chess player in her youth, winning the Croatian Chess Juniors Championship eight times.

== Personal life ==
Semka was a descendant of an influential Sokolović family. She was born in Sarajevo, Kingdom of Yugoslavia. Her mother Abida was a seamstress. Sokolović's older sister Badema (1929–1969) was a mezzo-soprano singer. She was married to chess International Master Mario Bertok

In March 2008, Sokolović's son Mario Bertok announced her death from internal bleeding following a stroke. She was 72.

== Career ==
In addition to her work at a theatre in Zagreb, she appeared in numerous film roles. She made her film debut in 1956. Among others, she performed in the 1967 TV film Kineski zid (an adaptation of the Max Frisch's play Die Chinesische Mauer). She also had a supporting role in La Corta delle bambole notte di vetro (1971, directed by Aldo Lado), starring Ingrid Thulin and Mario Adorf.

In the TV movie Roko i Cicibela (1978, directed by Stipe Delić), she played the female lead role. Sokolović-Bertok also starred as a high school headmistress in the satirical film Majstori, majstori! (1980, directed by Goran Marković). Her last film was Traktor, ljubezen in Rock'n'Roll (2008, directed by Branko Đurić). Her final film roles were in 2004's Days and Hours, directed by Pjer Žalica, and the 2006 film Grbavica, directed by Jasmila Žbanić.
