= Mustafa Nadarević =

Bosnian actor (1943–2020)

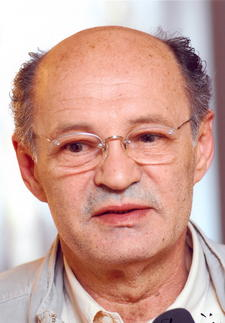
- Nadarević in 2008
- Born: 2 May 1943; Banja Luka, Independent State of Croatia (modern-day Bosnia and Herzegovina)
- Died: 22 November 2020 (aged 77); Zagreb, Croatia
- Burial place: Cremated at Mirogoj Cemetery, Zagreb
- Other names: Mujo; Mujica
- Citizenship: Bosnia and Herzegovina; Slovenia
- Education: Academy of Performing Arts, Sarajevo; Academy of Dramatic Art, Zagreb
- Occupations: Actor; comedian
- Years active: 1968–2020
- Spouses: Jasna Nadarević (divorced) Snježana Nožinić (divorced) Slavica Radović (m. 2012; died 2012)
- Children: 3
- Parents: Mehmed Nadarević (father); Asja Memić (mother)

Mustafa Nadarević (pronounced [mustâfa nadǎːreʋitɕ]; 2 May 1943 – 22 November 2020) was a Bosnian and Croatian actor. Widely considered one of the greatest actors from the former Yugoslavia, he starred in over 70 films, including The Smell of Quinces (1982), When Father Was Away on Business (1985), Reflections (1987), The Glembays (1988), Kuduz (1989), Silent Gunpowder (1990), The Perfect Circle (1997), Days and Hours (2004), Mirage (2004), and Halima's Path (2012).

More recently, Nadarević was best known for playing Izet Fazlinović in the sitcom Lud, zbunjen, normalan from the beginning of the series in 2007 until his death in 2020.

== Early life and career ==
Nadarević was born on 2 May 1943 in Banja Luka to Bosniak parents Mehmed Nadarević and Asja Memić. They fled from Banja Luka to Zagreb due to bombing of the city. Mehmed also served in the Croatian Home Guard, before dying in 1946. Nadarević attended elementary school in Zagreb and Bosanski Novi, and Gymnasium in Rijeka. He studied acting at the Academy of Performing Arts in Sarajevo and got his diploma at the Academy of Dramatic Art in Zagreb.

Nadarević joined the Croatian National Theatre in Zagreb (HNK) in 1969, and rose to the title of the Principal Actor, and remained employed by their drama ensemble until his retirement in 2012. In his theatre career he played over 150 parts, mostly at the HNK Zagreb, but also collaborating with HNK Ivan pl. Zajc in Rijeka, HNK in Split and the Dubrovnik Summer Games. His first leading role was in a production of Lorenzaccio, and he rose to theatrical fame with a performance of Pomet in a 1981 production of Dundo Maroje. His subsequent roles were largely leading ones, for which he received numerous awards, such as the Marul Award at the Marulićevi dani by HNK Split, the Orlando at the Dubrovnik Summer Games, three Golden Wreaths of the MESS, the Sterija Award at the Sterijino pozorje, the Dubravko Dujšin Award by Vjesnik, the Vladimir Nazor Award, the Golden Laugh at the Dani satire by Kerempuh, the Croatian Theatre Award, etc.

During his long acting career, Nadarević built a reputation as one of the most recognizable character actors in the Balkans. In the former Yugoslavia, Nadarević was seen playing in roles mostly as a Partisan soldier. He was best known for his work in the films When Father Was Away on Business, Reflections, The Glembays, among many others. His performance as Leone Glembay in the Antun Vrdoljak film adaptation of Messrs. Glembay is widely considered to be one of the most significant acting milestones in Yugoslav film history. It won him the Golden Arena for Best Actor at the 1988 Pula Film Festival, among other accolades.

Nadarević played a variety of roles in various films produced throughout the areas of the Balkans. In 1991, he won the award for Best Actor at the 17th Moscow International Film Festival for his role in Silent Gunpowder.

In addition to his theatre, film and television acting careers, he is also remembered for occasional forays into theatre directing, with notable productions of One Flew Over the Cuckoo's Nest, Balkan Spy, A Performance of Hamlet in the Village of Mrduša Donja and Hasanaginica.

Nadarević's last film role was in Antun Vrdoljak's 2019 film General, playing the Croatian general Janko Bobetko.

During the last years of his life, Nadarević was best known for playing the hilarious television character, Izet Fazlinović, in the Bosnian sitcom Lud, zbunjen, normalan; the character can be described as sexually unsatisfied 70-year-old man who will do anything but work to own a dollar, and throw insults at anyone he can.

== Personal life and death ==
Nadarević married three times. He had a daughter, Nađa, with his first wife Jasna. He had a son, Aša, and another daughter, Nana, with his second wife Snježana Nožinić. Nadarević's third wife, Slavica Radović (25 April 1964 – 7 June 2012), a Slovenian costume designer, died at the age of 48 after a decade-long struggle with breast cancer. She and Nadarević had been in a relationship for twenty years, and he took on Slovenian citizenship to be able to rest next to her when he died.

In January 2020, Nadarević revealed that he was diagnosed with lung cancer. He died on 22 November 2020 at his home in Zagreb after battling an illness. The funeral was held at the Mirogoj Cemetery crematorium in Zagreb, in the presence of his immediate family.

== Filmography ==
=== Film ===
- Gravitacija ili fantastična mladost činovnika Borisa Horvata (1968) – Blaja
- Timon (1973)
- Snađi se, druže (1981)
- Zločin u školi (1982) – Bartol
- The Smell of Quinces (1982) – Mustafa
- Kiklop (1982) – Don Fernando
- U raljama života (1984)
- Zadarski memento (1984) – Bepo Marini
- Mala pljačka vlaka (1984) – Paragraf
- Horvat's Choice (1985) – Vinko Benčina
- When Father Was Away on Business (1985) – Zijah Zijo Zulfikarpašić
- Ljubavna pisma s predumišljajem (1985) – Dr. Bošnjak
- The War Boy (1985) – Mill manager
- Večernja zvona (1986) – Matko
- Poslednji skretničar uzanog koloseka (1986) – Mungo
- Dobrovoljci (1986) – Gynecologist
- Ljubezni Blanke Kolak (1987) – Pavel
- Hudodelci (1987) – Ljuba Kurtović
- Reflections (1987) – Mihailo
- Zaboravljeni (1988) – Martin
- The Glembays (1988) – Dr. phil. Leone Glembay
- Klopka (1988) – Saša
- Seobe II (1989) – Višnjevski
- Povratak Katarine Kozul (1989) – Silvio
- Kuduz (1989) – Policeman Šemso
- Silent Gunpowder (1990) – Španac
- Captain America (1990) – Tadzio's father
- Adam ledolomak (1990)
- Moj brat Aleksa (1991)
- Đuka Begović (1991) – Mata
- Srećna dama (1991) – Boris
- Story from Croatia (1991) – Andrija
- Holiday in Sarajevo (1991) – Avduka Lipa
- Countess Dora (1993) – Tuna, the driver
- Vukovar: The Way Home (1994) – Martin
- Gospa (1995) – Mayor Štović
- Washed Out (1995) – Father
- Nausikaja (1995) – Inspector Stevović
- Nausikaja (1996)
- The Perfect Circle (1997) – Hamza
- Puška za uspavljivanje (1997) – Karlo Štajner
- Transatlantik (1998)
- Četverored (1999) – Cute captain
- Hop, Skip & Jump /short/ (2000)
- Je li jasno prijatelju? (2000) – Nikola
- No Man's Land (2001) – Old Serbian soldier
- Polagana predaja (2001) – Banker Parać
- Kraljica noći (2001) – Tomo's father
- Prezimiti u Riju (2002) – Grga
- Heimkehr (2003) – Vlado
- Long Dark Night (2004) – Španac
- Na planinčah (2004)
- The Society of Jesus (2004) – Castelan
- Secret Passage (2004) – Foscari's Informant
- Days and Hours (2004) – Idriz
- Mirage (2004) – Teacher
- Nafaka (2006) – Marks
- Ničiji sin (2008) – Izidor
- Kao rani mraz (2010) – Verebes
- Daca bobul nu moare (2010) – Iorgovan
- Piran-Pirano (2010) – Veljko
- Cannibal Vegetarian (2012) – Pathologist Marelja
- Halima's Path (2012) – Avdo
- When Day Breaks (2012) – Professor Miša Brankov
- Čefurji raus! (2013) – Čiča
- The Brave Adventures of a Little Shoemaker (2013) – Good Košarac
- For Good Old Times (2018) – Krcko
- General (2019) – Janko Bobetko

=== Television ===
- Prosjaci i sinovi (1971) – Iviša
- Tomo Bakran (1978) – Koloman pl. Balloczanski
- Velo misto (1980–1981) – Duje
- Nitko se neće smijati (1985) – Milan
- Pat pozicija (1986)
- Doktorova noć (1990) – Doctor
- Dok nitko ne gleda (1993)
- Prepoznavanje (1996) – Ana's Father
- Život sa žoharima (2000) – Gazda
- Novo doba (2002) – Petar Strukan
- Neki čudni ljudi (2006–2007) – Vili S. Tončić
- Lud, zbunjen, normalan (2007–2020) – Izet Fazlinović / Ismet Fazlinović (final appearance)
- General (2019–2020) – Janko Bobetko

== Awards ==
Year	Award	Category	Nominated work	Result	Ref.
1991	Silver St. George	Best Actor	Silent Gunpowder	Won	
1988	Golden Arena	Best Actor	The Glembays	Won	
1995	Golden Arena	Best Supporting Actor	Washed Out	Won	
