= Saša Petrović (actor) =

Bosnian and Serbian actor (born 1962)

- Born: January 2, 1962; Sarajevo, SFR Yugoslavia
- Died: January 27, 2023 (aged 61); Bosnia and Herzegovina
- Occupation: Actor
- Years active: 1975–2024

Saša Petrović (Serbo-Croatian Cyrillic: Саша Петровић; 2 January 1962 – 27 January 2023) was a Bosnian actor known for his work in film, television, and theatre. He gained recognition for his roles in No Man’s Land (2001), Teško je biti fin (2007), Lud, zbunjen, normalan (2007–2009), and Hajde da se volimo 2 (1989), in which he portrayed the character Čaki. Petrović appeared in over 50 productions across the former Yugoslavia and Europe.

== Early life ==
Saša Petrović was born on 2 January 1962 in Sarajevo, then part of the Socialist Federal Republic of Yugoslavia. He developed an interest in acting at a young age and began performing in theatre and television productions during the 1980s. Early in his career, he was also credited under the name Aleksandar Petrović.

== Career ==
Petrović made his screen debut in the mid-1970s and gained wider recognition in the 1980s through appearances in Yugoslav television films and series. One of his early notable roles was in When Father Was Away on Business (1985), directed by Emir Kusturica.

In 1989, he appeared in the musical comedy Hajde da se volimo 2, portraying Terapeut Čaki, a performance that became one of his most remembered roles.

Following the breakup of Yugoslavia, Petrović continued working steadily in Bosnian, Serbian, Croatian, and international productions. He achieved international recognition with his role as a Bosnian soldier in the Academy Award–winning film No Man’s Land (2001), directed by Danis Tanović.

Throughout the 2000s, Petrović appeared on television, notably in the sitcom Lud, zbunjen, normalan as Stjepan Mrvica and in Vratiće se rode. He also starred in films such as Gori vatra (2003), Nafaka (2006), and Teško je biti fin (2007). In the 2010s, he appeared in international productions including the Swedish crime film series Easy Money (Snabba cash) and its sequel, as well as Die Parade (2011). His later work included television roles and the miniseries Der Helicopter Coup (2024), released posthumously.

== Personal life ==
Petrović lived and worked primarily in Bosnia and Herzegovina, while collaborating on regional and international projects. He generally kept his private life out of the public eye.

== Death ==
Saša Petrović died on 27 January 2023 in Bosnia and Herzegovina at the age of 61. His death was reported by regional media and fellow actors, who paid tribute to his long and diverse acting career.

== Filmography ==
- Solista i beton — 1975
- Audicija — 1985
- Papa ist auf Dienstreise — 1985
- Znak (TV series) — 1986
- Život radnika — 1987
- Das bißchen Seele — 1987
- Kuduz — 1989
- Ružina osveta — 1989
- Hajde da se volimo 2 — 1989
- Istočno od istoka — 1990
- Brod plovi za Šangaj — 1991
- Sa 204–272 — 1991
- Prokleta je Amerika — 1992
- Puki — 1998
- Nepitani — 1999
- No Man’s Land — 2001
- Igraj do kraja — 2002
- 42 1/2 — 2003
- Ljeto u zlatnoj dolini — 2003
- Gori vatra — 2003
- Dobro uštimani mrtvaci — 2005
- Ram za sliku moje domovine — 2005
- Nafaka — 2006
- Sve džaba — 2006
- Teško je biti fin — 2007
- Lud, zbunjen, normalan (TV series) — 2007–2009
- Vratiće se rode (TV series) — 2007–2008
- Easy Money — 2010
- Die Parade — 2011
- Easy Money 2 — 2012
- Šanghaj — 2012
- Snabba Cash – Livet deluxe — 2013
- Sabina K. — 2015
- ZG80 — 2016
- Dobrodošli u Orient Express (TV series) — 2016
- Lepa Brena: Zar je važno da l’ se peva ili pjeva — 2017
- Der Helicopter Coup (TV miniseries) — 2024

== See also ==
- Cinema of Bosnia and Herzegovina
- Cinema of Yugoslavia
