= Summer in the Golden Valley =

- Directed by: Srđan Vuletić
- Written by: Srđan Vuletić
- Produced by: Ademir Kenović
- Starring: Haris Sijarić; Svetozar Cvetković; Kemal Čebo
- Cinematography: Slobodan Trninić
- Edited by: Catherine Kelber
- Music by: Simon Boswell
- Release date: 2003
- Running time: 105 minutes
- Countries: Bosnia and Herzegovina, France, United Kingdom
- Language: Bosnian

Summer in the Golden Valley (Bosnian: Ljeto u zlatnoj dolini) is a 2003 Bosnian film by Srđan Vuletić, produced by Ademir Kenović. The movie is about a 16-year-old boy who has to repay his dead father's debt. In order to collect money, his friend and he get involved in Sarajevo's underground crime.

== Plot ==
At the traditional Muslim funeral service for his father, Fikret Varupa a sixteen-year-old boy from Sarajevo, learns that his father owes money to Hamid, a man he does not even know. The debt is considerable and Hamid does not want it to go to the grave with the body, so the debt automatically passes from the father to the son. Since in Bosnia this way of collecting debts, at a funeral, is considered to be utterly humiliating, it is never, ever applied. Fikret and his entire family become subjects of ridicule. Fikret, who is practically still a child, is decisive to "redeem his father's soul". Wishing to repay his father's debt and to secure the forgiveness, Fikret wanders into the real world of Sarajevo, the world that is ruled by post-war chaos, misery and poverty and becomes an ideal target for two corrupted policemen who wish to "help" him: they plant the kidnapped girl on him.

== Cast ==
- Haris Sijarić as Fikret Varupa
- Svetozar Cvetković as Ramiz
- Kemal Čebo as Tiki
- Zana Marjanović as Sara
- Emir Hadžihafizbegović as Hamid
- Aleksandar Seksan as Cico
- Sadžida Šetić as Majka
- Admir Glamočak as Klupa
- Dragan Jovičić as Jasmin
- Saša Petrović as Shopkeeper
- Ðani Jaha as Špico
- Miraj Grbić as Ćupo
- Maja Salkić as Air Hostess #1
- Amar Bektešević as Child actor
- Dženana Nikšić as Selma
- Senad Bašić as Ispijeni
- Ermin Sijamija as Mister BH
- Moamer Kasumović as Boy sitting on bench #2

== Awards and nominations ==
=== Wins ===
- Bermuda International Film Festival - Jury Prize - 2004
- Golden Iris - Brussels European Film Festival - 2004
- Tiger Award - Rotterdam International Film Festival - 2004
- MovieZone Award - Rotterdam International Film Festival - 2004
- Sofia International Film Festival - Special Jury Award - 2004
- Sofia International Film Festival - FIPRESCI Prize - 2004

=== Nominations ===
- Sofia International Film Festival - Grand Prix - 2004
- Sarajevo Film Festival - The Heart of Sarajevo (Best Film Award)

== Soundtrack ==
Zlatna Dolina (Soundtrack)

Soundtrack album by Edo Maajka
- Released: 2003
- Genre: Hip hop
- Label: FM Jam

Edo Maajka chronology
Slušaj Mater (2001)	Zlatna Dolina (Soundtrack) (2003)	No Sikiriki (2004)

The soundtrack for the film, released as Zlatna Dolina, was compiled by Edo Maajka.

#	Title	Performer	Featured guest(s)
1	"Zlatna Dolina"	Edo Maajka	Goldn valley
2	"Jeste Li Spremni"	DJ Čekić	Are you ready
3	"Jaran"	Rima D	Friend
4	"BTS (Bust The System)"	Disciplinska Komisija	Billy
5	"Suze"	Marčelo	Edo Maajka
6	"Home Team"	DJ Čekić	Amon Ra and Verbalitics
7	"Uštekaj se"	Sove	Connect yourself
8	"Svijet"	Mučenička Grupa	world
9	"Pismo Majci"	Rima D	Letter to mother
10	"Amon Racija"	Amon Ra	Amon "fever"
