= Moamer Kasumović =

Bosnian actor and producer (born 1981)

- Born: 12 December 1981 (age 44); Bijelo Polje, SR Montenegro, SFR Yugoslavia
- Education: Academy of Performing Arts in Sarajevo
- Occupations: Actor, producer
- Years active: 2003–2024

Moamer Kasumović (Cyrillic: Моамер Касумовић; born 12 December 1981) is a Bosnian actor and producer. He gained recognition for portraying the role of Damir Fazlinović in the sitcom Lud, zbunjen, normalan from 2007 to 2021.

Kasumović's first television role was in Summer in the Golden Valley in 2003. He has also produced the short film Non-Stop Plavi and feature films Hiljadarka and The Life of Flowers.

Kasumović was sentenced to one year in prison for the criminal offense of fornication against a minor committed in 2021; the verdict was delivered with an option of paying a fixed monetary sum in exchange for avoiding prison.

== Legal proceedings ==
On September 16, 2024, at the Sarajevo National Theatre as part of Sarajevo Fest, during a Q&A session following the staging of a National Theatre in Belgrade play, Tiho, tiše, whose plot is focused on peer violence, an underage male in the crowd stated, as part of asking a question, that in 2021 when he was 14 years old, he had been sexually abused by a "well known actor". Prompted by others in the crowd as to the abuser's identity, the underage male revealed it was Kasumović, before further stating that the case was legally tried and that Kasumović was convicted for the crime in a court ruling.

Attempting to confirm the underage male's claims, Raport.ba web portal submitted a request to the Sarajevo Municipal Court, reportedly getting a response that such information couldn't be publicly disclosed as per a provision within the criminal code in Bosnia and Herzegovina. The portal then tried the Sarajevo Canton Court, reportedly getting the same response. Eventually, by September 19, 2024, the Sarajevo Canton Prosecutor's Office, confirmed to the portal that an indictment had been issued against Kasumović for the criminal offence of "sexual intercourse against a minor" (bludne radnje, obljuba) for which he had been sentenced in 2021 to one year in prison, with an option of avoiding incarceration by paying a fixed sum of KM36,500 (~€18,600). Following the conclusion of the appeals process, in November 2023, he took the payment option and thus avoided prison time. The option of making a monetary payment in lieu of prison time is reportedly available to all convicted criminals in Bosnia and Herzegovina sentenced to up to one year.

Once reported on in the Sarajevo-based media, the case became major news in Bosnia and Herzegovina and to a lesser extent in Montenegro where Kasumović had reportedly returned to and began spending most of his time following his initial 2021 conviction in Sarajevo. In response to revelations about Kasumović, Federalna televizija announced the decision of removing reruns of Lud, zbunjen, normalan, actor's best known work, from the network's broadcast schedule. His co-star in the series Senad Bašić expressed shock, adding that "[the cast and crew] had no idea about Kasumović's proclivities, which he obviously hid very well". Kasumović's only reaction to his sex offender conviction becoming public knowledge took place via his Facebook page where, in October 2024, he shared a web link to an op-ed by his Montenegrin legal representative Mihailo Volkov, published in the Podgorica-based Pobjeda daily, arguing that Kasumović's verdict in Sarajevo should have been overturned due to a "number of procedural issues".

== Filmography ==
=== As actor ===
==== Film ====
Year	Title	Role	Notes
2003	Summer in the Golden Valley	Boy sitting on bench No. 2	
2005	Prva plata	Motorist	Short film
2005	Dobro uštimani mrtvaci	Ferid	
2006	All for Free	Mršavi	
2008	Čuvari noći	Policeman No. 2	
2009	Majka		Short film
2010	Piran-Pirano	Young Veljko	
2012	Twice Born	Zoran	
2013	Non-Stop Plavi	Mountaineer	Short film; Also producer
2013	Čefurji raus!	Customs officer No. 1	
2014	How I Quit Drinking and Became a Mother	Bridegroom	Short film
2015	Hiljadarka	Fadil	Also executive producer
2015	Our Everyday Life	Malik	
2017	The Frog	Muki	
2017	Fountain	Edin	Short film
2018	Nasumice	Elvis	

==== Television ====
Year	Title	Role	Notes
2004	Mujo i Haso superstars	Jonas from Germany	Appeared in one episode
2004–2005	Crna hronika	Neven	
2005	Sex i selo	Hamo	
2007–2021	Lud, zbunjen, normalan	Damir Fazlinović	
2012	Priče iza diskrecione linije		
2013	Dragi blože		Miniseries
2013	Patriot	Goc	Miniseries
2018	Dragi susjedi	Tomislav Zovko	

=== As producer ===
==== Film ====
Year	Title	Director	Writer	Producer	Actor	Notes
2013	Non-Stop Plavi	No	No	Yes	Yes	Short film
2016	The Life of Flowers	No	No	Yes	No	

=== As executive producer ===
==== Film ====
Year	Title	Notes
2015	Hiljadarka	Also actor
