= Slobodan Trninić =

Croatian cinematographer (born 1953)

- Born: 14 January 1953 (age 73); Banja Luka, SFR Yugoslavia
- Occupation: Cinematographer
- Years active: 1985–present

Slobodan Trninić (born 14 January 1953) is a Croatian cinematographer.

Trninić graduated from the University of Zagreb Academy of Drama Arts in 1979, and his first feature film was the 1991 Yugoslav film Virgina (Serbo-Croatian: Virdžina), directed by Serbian director Srđan Karanović.

That same year Trninić shot Rajko Grlić's film Charuga, and in 1993 he shot The Golden Years (Croatian: Zlatne godine; directed by Davor Žmegač), a drama for which he won the Golden Arena for Best Cinematography at the 1993 Pula Film Festival, the Croatian national film awards.

He continued to work with a number of films in Croatia and abroad, and in 2010 he won his second Golden Arena for his work on Just Between Us (Croatian: Neka ostane među nama; directed by Rajko Grlić).

== Selected filmography ==
- Charuga (Čaruga, 1991; directed by Rajko Grlić)
- Virgina (Virdžina, 1991; directed by Srđan Karanović)
- The Golden Years (Zlatne godine, 1993; directed by Davor Žmegač)
- Putovanje tamnom polutkom, 1995; directed by Davor Žmegač)
- Tranquilizer Gun (Puška za uspavljivanje, 1997; directed by Hrvoje Hribar)
- Dubrovnik Twilight (Dubrovački suton, 1999; directed by Željko Senečić)
- Je li jasno, prijatelju?, 2000; directed by Dejan Aćimović)
- Josephine, 2002; directed by Rajko Grlić)
- The Sunken Cemetery (Potonulo groblje, 2002, directed by Mladen Juran)
- Horseman (Konjanik, 2003; directed by Branko Ivanda)
- Summer in the Golden Valley (Ljeto u zlatnoj dolini, 2003; directed by Srđan Vuletić)
- The Border Post (Karaula, 2006; directed by Rajko Grlić)
- It's Hard to be Nice (Teško je biti fin, 2007; directed by Srđan Vuletić)
- No One's Son (Ničiji sin, 2008; directed by Arsen Anton Ostojić)
- Just Between Us (Neka ostane među nama, 2010; directed by Rajko Grlić)
- Halima's Path (Halimin put, 2012)
