= When Santa Was a Communist =

- Promotional release poster
- Bosnian: Djeda Mraz u Bosni
- Directed by: Emir Kapetanović
- Written by: Emir Kapetanović; Vahid Duraković
- Produced by: Emir Kapetanović; Jasmin Duraković; Bogdan Petković; Natalija Rudić; Slaven Knezović; Daliborka Puž; Jovan Todorović; Džemal Šabić
- Starring: Mirvad Kurić; Zana Marjanović; Miraj Grbić; Mirza Tanović; Kristin Winters
- Cinematography: Miksa Anđelić
- Edited by: Saša Peševski
- Music by: Adis Sirbubalo
- Production companies: Depo; Emote Films; Eurofilm
- Distributed by: Depo
- Release date: 21 August 2024 (Sarajevo)
- Running time: 86 minutes
- Countries: Bosnia and Herzegovina; Serbia; Croatia
- Languages: Bosnian; English; Croatian

When Santa Was a Communist (Bosnian: Djeda Mraz u Bosni, lit. 'Ded Moroz in Bosnia') is a 2024 black comedy film co-written, co-produced and directed by Emir Kapetanović. Starring Mirvad Kurić, Zana Marjanović, Miraj Grbić, Mirza Tanović and Kristin Winters. It is about a group of actors who travel across the country to perform a Christmas play that brings joy to children, but not to adults.

== Synopsis ==
In December 2023, a group of actors travel to smaller settlements in Bosnia and Herzegovina to perform a play about Santa Claus. The children are delighted, waiting patiently for the presentation. However, old conflicts among adults will awaken when they recognize the figure of Santa Claus as a communist.

== Cast ==
- Mirvad Kurić as Burhan
- Zana Marjanović as Selma
- Miraj Grbić as Zoka
- Mirza Tanović as Jerry
- Kristin Winters as Ella
- Goran Kostić as Merdžo
- Alek Kapetanović Marjanović as Niko
- Mara Auriel as Ivana
- Vanessa Glodjo as Zumra
- Saša Oručević as Ivo
- Zijo Bajrić as Zijo
- Miro Barnjak as Besim
- Ajla Beganović as the Receptionist
- Semir Beganović as the Groom

== Production ==
Principal photography began on 11 March 2023, and wrapped on 3 April 2023, in Bugojno, Bosnia and Herzegovina.

== Release ==
The film had its world premiere on 21 August 2024, at the 30th Sarajevo Film Festival, then screened on 23 August 2024, at the 6th Avantura Film Festival, on 18 October 2024, at the 13th Tuzla Film Festival, and on 26 November 2024, at the 55th International Film Festival of India.
