= The Smell of Quinces =

1982 film

- Directed by: Mirza Idrizović
- Written by: Zuko Džumhur; Mirza Idrizović; Karel Valtera
- Produced by: Nikola Nikić
- Starring: Mustafa Nadarević; Ljiljana Blagojević; Irfan Mensur
- Cinematography: Danijal Šukalo
- Release date: 30 June 1982
- Running time: 97 minutes
- Country: Yugoslavia
- Language: Serbo-Croatian

The Smell of Quinces (Serbian: Miris dunja) is a 1982 Yugoslav drama film directed by Mirza Idrizović. It was entered into the 13th Moscow International Film Festival. The film was also selected as the Yugoslav entry for the Best Foreign Language Film at the 55th Academy Awards, but was not accepted as a nominee.

== Cast ==
- Mustafa Nadarević as Mustafa
- Ljiljana Blagojević as Luna
- Irfan Mensur as Ibrahim
- Izet Hajdarhodžić as Hamdibeg
- Nada Djurevska as Azra
- Semka Sokolović-Bertok as Esma
- Boro Stjepanović as Alkalaj
- Špela Rozin as Marija
- Branko Đurić as Lt. Storm
- Zijah Sokolović as Huso Mujagin

== See also ==
- List of submissions to the 55th Academy Awards for Best Foreign Language Film
- List of Yugoslav submissions for the Academy Award for Best Foreign Language Film
