= Horvat's Choice =

Horvat's Choice (Croatian: Horvatov izbor) is a 1985 Yugoslav Croatian-language film directed by Eduard Galić, starring Rade Šerbedžija, Mustafa Nadarević, Milena Dravić and Mira Furlan. It is based on Vučjak, a 1923 play by Miroslav Krleža.

The film's extended footage was used for a 15-part TV series titled Putovanje u Vučjak, broadcast by Radiotelevision Zagreb in 1986–87.
