= List of Lud, zbunjen, normalan episodes =

The following is an episode list for the Bosnian television series Lud, zbunjen, normalan, which aired primarily on FTV and Nova TV from 2 September 2007 to 10 November 2021. All episodes were written by Feđa Isović, and directed by Elmir Jukić.

== Series overview ==
Series	Episodes	Originally released		
Series	Episodes	First released	Last released	Network
1	40	2 September 2007	1 June 2008	FTV
2	32	7 September 2008	12 April 2009	FTV
3	24	1 January 2010	13 June 2010	FTV
4	24	2 January 2011	26 June 2011	FTV
5	24	29 January 2012	7 April 2013	FTV
6	24	3 November 2014	1 April 2015	Nova TV
7	24	5 April 2015	10 May 2015	Nova TV
8	24	15 May 2015	2 November 2015	Nova TV
9	24	3 November 2015	25 June 2016	Nova TV
10	24	26 June 2016	19 July 2016	Nova TV
11	24	17 February 2020	25 March 2020	Nova TV
12	12	26 March 2020	21 July 2021	Nova TV
13	9	10 September 2021	10 November 2021	Nova TV

== Episodes ==
=== Season 1 (2007–2008) ===
No. overall	No. in season	Title	Original release date
1	1	"Opća Zabuna (General Confusion)"	2 September 2007
Damir goes to a video rental store and accidentally rents a gay porno. Izet and Faruk find out and become worried thinking that Damir might be gay, with Izet threatening to shoot him. Meanwhile, Damir believes Šefika is the crazy one, after he spots her watching the gay video. Guest-starring: Zlatan Zuhrić Zuhra as Nagib
2	2	"Crni Fond (The Black Funds)"	9 September 2007
Damir meets a girl in the library, but Izet scares her away after she comes to his apartment to rent a room. Meanwhile, Dino burns the mixer in the studio and Faruk buys a new one from the money everybody thinks he stole from Izet.
3	3	"Narkomanska Posla (Junkie Business)"	16 September 2007
Izet quits smoking but after a short period gives in and smokes a joint (thinking it is a regular cigarette). Meanwhile, Faruk tries to hook up Ivana with his cousin Samir. Guest-starring: Emir Hadžihafizbegović as Samir
4	4	"Problemi Sa Stolicom (Stool Issues)"	23 September 2007
Izet has problems with his stomach.
5	5	"Stara Slika (The Old Painting)"	30 September 2007
Izet gives an old painting to his new love, Spomenka, and later discovers that it is worth a lot of money. Faruk, also learning its value, tries to steal it back.
6	6	"Kupoprodaja slike i Folcike (Buying and Selling of the Painting and Volkswagen)"	7 October 2007
Izet wants to sell his Folkcika, but complications arise.
7	7	"Stezanje Kajša (Tightening the Belt)"	14 October 2007
Izet enforces money savings in the household.
8	8	"Bornov Identitet (The Brotti Identity)"	21 October 2007
Faruk wakes up one morning speaking Italian and presents himself as a famous painter named "Brotti". Rocker Đenis Đenis comes to Faruk's studio to record a song, but Faruk caught in his Brotti phase. Dr. Điđimilović comes to cure Faruk, while Izet has to go on pretending to be Faruk in order to keep the business Đenis Đenis came to offer. Dino screws everything up. Guest-starring: Enis Bešlagić as Đenis Đenis.
9	9	"Godišnjica Mature (Class Reunion)"	28 October 2007
Izet calls upon all his old colleges for a reunion in San Remo, but Faruk invites Izet's old enemy who tries to steal his girlfriend.
10	10	"Tripl Randevu (Triple Randezvous)"	4 November 2007
The three generations of Fazlinović find themselves in the same restaurant with their dates after all of them lie about where they are in order to go to a date, but a problem occurs which requires one of them to go.
11	11	"Uspavana Ljepotica (Sleeping Beauty)"	11 November 2007
Spomenka's daughter, Vedrana, arrives from America and Dino confuses her with her mother and sleeps with her but the real problems appear when Spomenka catches them.
12	12	"Kupoprodaja Folcike (Buying and Selling of the Volkswagen)"	18 November 2007
Faruk and Damir need money and in order to get it they steal Izet's car and ask for ransom.
13	13	"Kvar Na Kompjuteru (Computer Troubleshooting)"	25 November 2007
Damir has a problem with his computer; it is always broken, and while Izet eavesdrops he thinks that there is a problem with Damir not being able to perform sexually, which Izet ties to fix with the help of his doctor. Guest-starring: Enis Bešlagić as Đenis Đenis
14	14	"Silikonska Dolina (Silicon Valley)"	2 December 2007
Ivana's friend, Dragana, comes to visit her and wants her to get breast implants, but Faruk wants to renew his studio and Ivana gets something wrong. Meanwhile, Izet tries to break his leg in order to get the insurance money.
15	15	"Igre Na Nesreću (The Game of Bad Luck)"	9 December 2007
After Izet collects the insurance money he promises the money to his children if he gets the premium of the lottery.
16	16	"Triper (Gonorrhea)"	16 December 2007
Everyone is going around thinking that everyone else has a sexual disease.
17	17	"Prizivanje Duhova (Necromancy)"	23 December 2007
Izet wants to call upon his dead wife in order to tell him where she put the secret savings. Ivana and Faruk go to Ivana's old house and later Izet and Dino come too to see what they are doing.
18	18	"Ginisov Rekord (The Guinness Record)"	30 December 2007
Izet tries to get in the Guinness Book of World Records for money, while Ivana and Faruk try to hide their relationship.
19	19	"Kućna Dostava (Home Delivery)"	6 January 2008
Izet gets a job at Stjepan's cafe as a pizza delivery guy.
20	20	"Švedska Masaža (The Swedish Massage)"	13 January 2008
Izet's back starts hurting and he orders a Swedish massage, but someone else ends up having it.
21	21	"Umro Predsjednik, Živio Predsjednik (The President Is Dead, Long Live The President)"	20 January 2008
The president of the apartment complex died, so Izet goes up for elections in order to become the new president, but someone is standing in his way. Guest starring: Rambo Amadeus as himself
22	22	"Prepotentna Situacija (The Overbearing Situation)"	27 January 2008
Izet has potency issues, but the Viagra given to him by the doctor ends up being taken by Dino and Faruk as well.
23	23	"Testament (Last Will And Testimony)"	3 February 2008
Faruk and Damir find out that Izet has a testament written, but they only receive two minor gifts, while his love Spomenka is written to get the apartment and money, so the two of them call Samir in order to change the testament behind Izet's back, but something unexpected happens. Guest starring: Emir Hadžihafizbegović as Samir
24	24	"Edin il' Edina (Edin Or Edina)"	10 February 2008
A new woman shows up and Dino hits it off with her, but there is something that Faruk knows about her that Dino does not.
25	25	"Grupni Seks (Manage A Trois)"	17 February 2008
Spomenka's cousin Senka comes and lives in her apartment.
26	26	"Kroatiše Pupi (Kroatische Puppy)"	24 February 2008
Damir finds an abandoned dog which Izet gives to Senka as a gift.
27	27	"Ptičija Gripa - Priča Prva (The Bird Flu, Part I)"	2 March 2008
A new tenant moves in next to Izet, Enes Hadžiethemćumurović. The bird flu goes around the city. Izet does some business with his nephew Samir. Guest starring: Emir Hadžihafizbegović as Samir
28	28	"Ptičija Gripa - Priča Druga (The Bird Flu, Part II)"	9 March 2008
After Samir screws Izet, Izet is seeking his money back and revenge. Meanwhile, Ivana is in love with Srećko, a man which Faruk does not like.
29	29	"Oktobarska Revolucija (The October Revolution)"	16 March 2008
Izet and his communist friends are trying to cause the revolution, but the leader (not Izet) was arrested because of some fake euros.
30	30	"Kurs Engleskog (The English Course)"	23 March 2008
Izet wants to learn English and buys a book.
31	31	"Povratak Broja 1 (Return of The Number One)"	30 March 2008
Izet's father Muharem returns to Sarajevo to give Izet's family a lot of money and properties. But before it, he dies.
32	32	"Turnir (The Tournament)"	6 April 2008
The whole male crew: Izet, as the couch and the players Faruk, Damir, Samir, Dino, Stjepan and Dr.Džidimilovićes nephew, Srečko (who plays professionally in the Netherlands) make a team for a tournament where Izet bet a lot of money on, but there is a big twist that only Izet knows and the others do not. Meanwhile, Enes and Šefika are in budding romance, but Šefika left Enes because of thong underwear which Enes 'bought' for her (actually, he has bought gloves, but the woman in shop screwed everything up).
33	33	"Diler Pod Stare Dane (Dealer Under The Old Days)"	13 April 2008
Guest star: Sejo Sexon (Davor Sučić - aka "Sejo Sexon")- Member of the rock group "Zabranjeno Pušenje", he is good friends with Faruk.
34	34	"Proka Pronalazač (Mr. Inventor)"	20 April 2008
Izet wants to see a close-up of electricity. Later because of an accident the entire city loses power.
35	35	"Snimak Pluća (Chest X-Ray)"	27 April 2008
Enes leaves an X-ray of his father's lungs and everyone then thinks that it is an X-ray of Izet and that he only has 6 days to live, so they are being really nice to him.
36	36	"Bilo Jednom u Sarajevu (Once Upon A Time In Sarajevo)"	4 May 2008
Izet and Faruk talk about what happened to Damir's mother and how the crew met each other in Stjepan's cafe in 1985 with Faruk and Izet telling two different version of how things were.
37	37	"DNK Analiza (DNA Analysis)"	11 May 2008
Izet has to go to the hospital for an analysis. After that, Nevena and Izet met in the hotel and Nevena left Izet a lot of money before she went back to London.
38	38	"Doktor Fazlinović (Dr. Fazlinović)"	18 May 2008
Izet accidentally becomes a Russian doctor in a gathering at Damir's and Inese's college.
39	39	"Novi Računar (The New Computer)"	25 May 2008
Izet and Damir have bought a new computer
40	40	"Eh, Kad Se Sjetim (Memory Lane)"	1 June 2008
Faruk caughts Izet in the car saloon thinking he will try to trick him again. They end up coming back home and think about some past events while drinking. They affectively review the season.

=== Season 2 (2008–2009) ===
No. overall	No. in season	Title	Original release date
41	1	"Audicija (The Audition)"	7 September 2008
Izet holds auditions for a new maid after Šefika finds a better job and leaves him worried about his house. The new house maid is called Rabija.
42	2	"Rasprodaja (The Sale)"	14 September 2008
Faruk owes money to someone and sells his studio furniture.
43	3	"Halucinacije (Hallucinations)"	21 September 2008
This is a continuation from episode 43, where Izet thinks he is hallucinating things and people, while his doctor confirms that and Faruk and Damir try to use that to their advantage, but Izet has a surprise for them.
44	4	"Prizivanje Izeta (The Ghost Whisperer)"	28 September 2008
Izet finds his old friend from the war, Mirko, who is really sick. Izet helps him, by giving him his legitimation. In hospital, Mirko has died, and everyone thinks that Izet has died.
45	5	"Kružni Tok (The Roundabout)"	5 October 2008
Enes (the politician) comes to Izet and asks him to join his political party. Izet at first refuses because it is not a communist party, but a democratic one, but after Enes explains there will be a large amount of money involved he accepts, but something unexpected happens at the end. Then Senka and Spomenka come to Izet to be with him, but at the same time and they go around and around the house until they meet each other and run away from Izet.
46	6	"Egzibicionist (The Exhibitionist)"	12 October 2008
This episodes involves some fake euro's and Izet being taken to the police station in his underwear along with Faruk.
47	7	"Blind Date"	19 October 2008
Izet starts to talk to a woman over the internet and it turns out to be someone he already knows, one of the cast members.
48	8	"Kokošinjac (The Chicken Coop)"	26 October 2008
Izet bought himself chickens in order to get eggs for free because the price of eggs went up, so he would sell the eggs too.
49	9	"Nedjeljom Na Groblje (Sunday, at the Graveyard)"	2 November 2008
Izet and Điđimilović both want to have woman, so they went on cemetery to get widowed woman.
50	10	"Policijska Država (The Police State)"	9 November 2008
Izet becomes a fake police officer in an audition for a movie, but then wanders off into the city and acts as a real police officer. Dino thinks he is confusing people with other people.
51	11	"Crna Mamba (The Black Mamba)"	16 November 2008
Izet wants to stay in shape for his Spomenka and goes to a type of spa and gym in a hotel to get "younger".
52	12	"Gay Parada (Gay Parade)"	23 November 2008
Izet accommodates a lesbian couple into his makeshift hotel by making Faruk and Damir sleep in the studio. Combe and Dino get involved in the lesbian couple's plan to promote sexual equality in Bosnia while Faruk is exposed to some disturbing sexual situations.
53	13	"Hitmejker (The Hitmaker)"	30 November 2008
A speaker fell on Dino's head, which caused that Dino has written a lot of songs and earned a lot of money. But, before dinner with Izet, the flusher fell on Dino's head and he became stupid again.
54	14	"Dejton"	7 December 2008
In the Fazlinovic household democracy came. All of them, Izet, Faruk, and Damir got a chunk of money and want to have a say on how to spend it. Although Izet does not like it at all. Ivana went to Germany. Dino buys Izet's Volkswagen Beetle.
55	15	"Afera Sangrija (The Sangria Affair)"	14 December 2008
Selma returned, the waitress, after finishing college. But since Bosnia is recovering still from war, there are no jobs for her, but gets Ivana's job because Ivana went to Germany for a month (but she remained there forever). Izet, Faruk and Damir have a strange encounter at San Remo with the ladies. Dino goes to a police station for questioning about a crime he committed, but ends up doing something worse.
56	16	"Brakorazvodna Parnica (The Divorce Partnership)"	21 December 2008
Stjepan and Marija are getting a divorce.
57	17	"Četiri Sekretara SKOJ-a"	28 December 2008
Izet organized the birthday of the formation of their military company. After they demolished San Remo, they were arrested.
58	18	"Analogno Na Digitalno (Analog to Digital)"	4 January 2009
Guest starring: Al Dino - Izet was released from the prison, and wants peace in his house.
59	19	"Zlatna Ribica (The Goldfish)"	11 January 2009
Faruk gets a goldfish from his girlfriend Tanja which Izet believes to be a magic fish granting him three wishes.
60	20	"Roštilj, Droga i Nauka (Barbecue, Drugs and Education)"	18 January 2009
Izet and Faruk think that someone is taking drugs and both try to get to the bottom of it while Damir tries to hide a secret of his own.
61	21	"Istorijska Povijest Studija Akord (The History of Studio Akord)"	25 January 2009
Faruk tells the story of how his studio "Accord" came about.
62	22	"Debeli i Ćelavi (The Fat and The Bald)"	1 February 2009
Faruk is trying to be metrosexual, while Izet is trying to get a hair.
63	23	"Goropadna Ana"	8 February 2009
Izet does not want to be in relationship with Ana anymore.
64	24	"Prokišnjavanje (The Roof Leak)"	15 February 2009
Izet bought a new roofing tile for a roof of the building, because old one has collapsed.
65	25	"Karaoke Show"	22 February 2009
Samir is trying to destroy Maria's business.
66	26	"Ikonografija (The Religious Icons)"	1 March 2009
Izet and Điđimilović are selling catholic icons in Međimurje.
67	27	"Pusti Snovi"	8 March 2009
Izet dreamed that he became richman. Then Faruk wakes him up and tells him he married Senada and that she will be mowing in. Izet starts so crying uncontrollably, he is still crying after 3 days. His crying is so contagious, Điđimilović, who came to help him, starts crying too. Faruk ends in hospital again after tripping while walking up the stairs.
68	28	"Agresivni Faruk (Aggressive Faruk)"	15 March 2009
Faruk is determined to marry Senada which Izet and Damir don't like. They end up trolling and committing a sabotage. Faruk gets so mad, he starts to beat up Izet.
69	29	"Gdje Čeljad Nisu Bijesna"	22 March 2009
Senada and Faruk are married. Izet makes a plan on how to sabotage them. His first attempt is to change the lock of the apartment. Then he marries a Chinese woman because of money and to troll Faruk.
70	30	"Alkoholizam i Renesansa"	29 March 2009
Faruk and Damir are talking about Izets siblings. Ironically, his identical twin brother Ismet comes from Sweden after 40 years to clean up then the messy grudges between them. But Izet being Izet destroys the plan with his crayziness. All while they trolling people around them and specifically Faruk, who is drunk from Absinthe due to depression. He thinks he is travelling through time.
71	31	"Puter i Starka (The Cougar)"	5 April 2009
Damir accidentally cheats on his girlfriend with some divorced doctor and doesn't want anyone to know, but Izet is Izet and tells Faruk. He thinks Senada is cheating on him and hires a private detective, who finds out, Senada is cheating with Damir. But that is a coincidence due to Damir, Senada and detective being in the wrong place at the wrong time.
72	32	"Ljubavni Jadi Mladih Fazlinovića (Love Pains)"	12 April 2009
There is a review of this season. All 3 generations of Fazlinović family are in the kitchen contemplating some past events with the help of strong alcohol while talking funny nonsense to those who call them on the house phone. Based on all their relationships with women Faruk and partially Damir came up with a theory that the family is cursed. Both of them agree, while Izet denies it. He won't admit he had it the worst. Some time during Damir becomes dangerously self-aware thinking it's like they are recording some kind of sitcom in their apartment and Faruk came up with a theory that people will start to think they are all homosexuals. Of course Izet denies the latter. Later Damir admits they are a crazy family, thus no women like them. And that it's all due to them living in the same space. This was supposed to be the last episode of the series, but after it was too popular in Croatia, the filming was continued a year later.

=== Season 3 (2010) ===
No. overall	No. in season	Title	Original release date
73	1	"Kralj Je Umro - Živio Refko (The King is Dead, Long Live Refko)"	1 January 2010
After winning some money on a sports bet, Dino dies due to compulsive overeating. After Izet finds out, he demands to get some money since he thinks Dino must pay him for the time he lived in his apartment for months. Faruk gets so angry he kick him out of his Studio. Izet then takes the money meant for funeral expenses from Dino's brother Refko after lying to him, that he actually paid for the ceremony.
74	2	"Potraga Za Blagom (The Treasure Hunt)"	10 January 2010
An old friend of Izet named Đuro(Djuro) comes to pay a visit to him with a plan how to get rich. They need to buy a land, where there is supposed to be a box of gold. The problem is they don't who is the owner. After some research Čombe is revealed as the owner. Izet and Đuro buy the land not knowing it was actually mine field.
75	3	"Minsko Polje (Mine Field)"	17 January 2010
Izet and Đuro are trying to solve the problem about the land they bought from Čombe.
76	4	"Dozivanje Tobe"	24 January 2010
Richman named Mahmut came to Faruk's studio to record several muslim religious songs. Meanwhile, Izet and Đuro find out that there are two treasure chests (the one that Čombe found in episode 74 was filled with treasure) and the one Izet and Đuro find is filled with cans of ham. They have sold it to Samir, who has sold it to Maria as a turkey. Because of that 'turkey', to whole recording plan goes to hell. Izet and Đuro end up eating the turkey, not knowing its their own ham, while laughing thinking about those who will eat that ham from 1938.
77	5	"Donacija (The Donation)"	31 January 2010
The Netherlands donated some domestic animals to Bosnia and Herzegovina. Izet and Đuro are trying to get a cow and to sell it, but they got a pig which died of hotness.
78	6	"Hot Line"	7 February 2010
Izet, Faruk and Damir are creating a hotline for women, to earn money.
79	7	"Hot Line 2"	14 February 2010
Izet, Faruk and Damir are creating a hotline for women, to earn money.
80	8	"Estrada i Showbiz (Stardom and Showbiz)"	21 February 2010
81	9	"Talent Show"	28 February 2010
Izet and Đuro sent Rabija to talent show to earn money, but Damir screws everything up.
82	10	"Ginekologija i Pita Od Višanja (Gynecology and Cherry Pita)"	7 March 2010
Rabija made a cherry pie for Đuro while she had stomachache.
83	11	"Prijemno Odjeljenje"	14 March 2010
Izet and Đuro opened a gynecology office in Izet's apartment.
84	12	"Poslovni Prostor (The Business Space)"	21 March 2010
85	13	"Djevojka Sa Sela (The Country Girl)"	28 March 2010
Rabija's sister comes to Sarajevo.
86	14	"Pasje Popodne"	4 April 2010
Ajna's former boyfriend and abuser, he was released from prison. He took Marija, Mariofil, Đido Mova, Faruk, Damir and considerable hostage in San Remo. In the end, Čombe saves them in a funny way by knocking him in the face by door, accidentally and drops pizzas.
87	15	"Policijske Igre (The Police Game)"	11 April 2010
Izet was caught while driving his Lada 2105 drunk.
88	16	"Prljavo Suđe (Dirty Dishes)"	18 April 2010
Rabija went to village for a short time and Fazlinovići are trying to find a replace for her. Meanwhile, Faruk needs a singer who will sing canzona written by one Italian woman.
89	17	"Osmi Mart (March 8)"	25 April 2010
It's 8 March, Women's Day. Faruk, Damir, Izet and Čombe want to give a perfect present for their girlfriends. Laura unknowingly ate a candy bar Čombe bought to Rabija. It is revealed that Čombe loves Rabija.
90	18	"Pasje Prijepodne"	1 May 2010
Ajna's ex-boyfriend escapes from prison and flees to Izet's house. There is taken hostage by Rabija, Izet, Faruk, Damir, Ajna, Laura and Sanjin, a gay man who was Faruk urged to persuade Ajna's boyfriend that he was gay, because Grdoba (Ajna's boyfriend) believed that there is nothing to Ajnom. Izet saves them by when he discovers that the rifle that is abomination took only one shot, and the abomination of anger fired a bullet into the ceiling after Izet tried to escape.
91	19	"Put Putuje Reufaga"	9 May 2010
92	20	"Lažna Maksuzija"	16 May 2010
In this episode, Izet gets Makzusija's in Herzegovina, from Ante. Faruk steals Rabija's cleaner which are replaced with Izet's maksuzijom. A Rapka washes clothes unaware that washes maksuzijom by Izet just got. The doctor and the police obviously think that it is because the Makzuzija.
93	21	"Večeri Poezije"	23 May 2010
Čombe accidentally becomes an artist.
94	22	"Hafifni Amidža (Terrible uncle)"	30 May 2010
95	23	"Usisivač (The Vacuum Cleaner)"	6 June 2010
Izet's old vacuum cleaner explodes, and Rabija quits her job.
96	24	"Tri Flaše (The Three Bottles)"	13 June 2010
There's a review of this season.

=== Season 4 (2011) ===
No. overall	No. in season	Title	Original release date
97	1	"Produžena Loza (The Extended Vine) (Loza also refers to a popular regional drink, Izet's Herzegovian grappa)"	2 January 2011
Damir gets a son.Izet and Faruk are happy and get drunk. Izet wants the child to be a military man, Faruk wants to be a Rock n' Roll singer, Marija wants to be a nice barman and Damir wants to be a doctor as him.
98	2	"Stomakologija (The Dentist Visit)"	23 January 2011
Refko has to go to the dentist. Meanwhile Damir and Barbara try to name their baby. They name him Dražen but Izet named him Džema Branko.
99	3	"Dadilja (The Babysitter)"	30 January 2011
Damir & Barbara try to find a nanny for their son. Izet changes their minds so he is Džema Branko's nanny. Refko & Čombe watch an Italian film Barbara is in.
100	4	"Plus-Minus"	6 February 2011
Faruk & Ajna try to get a baby.If the purple colour is on the +, they are getting the baby. If the purple colour is on the -, they are not. Because in the same day Izet had high temperature, Zumreta accidentally screws everything up.
101	5	"Vrijeme Ovulacije (The Time of Ovulation)"	13 February 2011
Faruk and Ajna go to a doctor from Zagreb to find out how to get her pregnant. Since Šukrija is moving in, they have to sleep on the couch. The next day, Izet destroys their bed and there is no other place than the radio station.
102	6	"Igraona (The Playhouse)"	20 February 2011
Refko & Čombe are prohibited to enter the radio station for a few days. Šukrija wants the Maksuzija rakija but he gets it when he sends Džema Branko to a playground to get some Maksuzija and make Izet miserable. The hole Sarajevo listens to the station because the sex Faruk and Ajna are having. Refko and Čombe screw everything up.
103	7	"Dnevni Program (The Daily Program)"	27 February 2011
Čombe and Refko have a brilliant idea how to raise the rating of the radio station Accord. Faruk persuaded to allow them to broadcast new shows that will be called Faceless interviews in which they will welcome interesting guests from various spheres of public life. Wager between Šukrija and Izet will be an incentive to engage in this second adventure of the infamous fish fishing in Miljacka.
104	8	"Kad Vrisne Štikla (When The High Heel Screams)"	6 March 2011
While walking in the city with Faruk, Ajna has sprained her leg in her high heels. That accident case means Ajna has to wear splints. Not only that, that brought Izet to get his old patenting inventions. Faruk meets Šejla, Šejla thinks he would want to see his mother. Later 5 minutes, Ajna found him at San Remo with Šejla's mother. Before she beat him up, she scares Šejla's mother away.
105	9	"Moral Prije Svega (Morals, Before Anything)"	13 March 2011
Čombe's half-brother Fuke leaves to the US. Čombe, in order to feel better after the emotional separation from his brothers, he drinks a lot of beer. Izet gets a surprise call from secret agent Đido Mova, and gets assigned for a mission. He has to follow an unknown woman named Fadila, which will later on turn out to be Čombe's mother...
106	10	"Refko Tarot (Refko, the Fortuneteller)"	20 March 2011
Refko will be the host in his show Refko told and foretold. Šukrija's eighth husband will be killed by his wife, Fadila because she had seven husbands and they all died one by one case of their wife. Faruk wants make Šukrija believe the male soothsayer Refko. When Šukrija has discovered this, he only believes the soothsayer Refko. Čombe screws everything up by Marija to answer and she called. Later Ajna called Refko and he said let Šukrija marry Fadila.
107	11	"Potraga za Šukrijom (The Search for Šukrija)"	27 March 2011
Izet's leisure evening will stop by panicked Šukrija. He realized that he wants to be killed by Fadila the asks Izet to help him save his head. In search of the apartment comes Fadila. Her arrival will make Šukrija to hide, and Izet to be actively involved in saving his life. The issue will further complicate when the apartment came Čombe and later Ajna the Faruk who, on suspicion that she murdered Šukrija, bring the police ...
108	12	"Motorijada (The Motorbike Parada)"	3 April 2011
Annoyed at the traffic jam in Sarajevo, Faruk decides to buy a motorcycle. Ajna is thrilled that his idea, and when Faruk motorcycle vessel Čombe will turn out that he has been right. The motorcycle will be stolen and this will lead to a number of interesting twists. Šukrija still trying to get rid of his wife Fadila, a selfless assistance in that his plan will give him a man of whom at least hoped - Izet .
109	13	"Specijalno Vaspitanje (Special Education)"	10 April 2011
Izet secretly teaches Džema about Marxism and sex. Things get discovered after Faruk told them to put a webcam.
110	14	"Trafiking (Child Trafficking)"	17 April 2011
Izet is desperate. Barbara and Damir hired Zumreta to guard small Dzema, and it is allowed that the child is only in the presence of a parent. But everything will change when Zumreta from walking back without Dzema. The child is kidnapped and Izet will use this fact to gain confidence in their teacher education work. Čombe and Refko by Faruk get a task generally clean the radio station. That the two of them require an extraordinary intellectual effort ...
111	15	"Zečiji Paprikaš (The Rabbit Stew)"	24 April 2011
In order to preserve a youthful appearance Šukrija, uses a moisturizer. Concerned about his own appearance and Izet decides to do something about it. To reach the best products for rejuvenation on the story involves Samir. Faruk will accidentally rip off Ajna's doll which Ajna's mother gave to her before Ajna's mother's death, while Šukrija will break a bottle full of precious Izet's maksuzija. Both of these events will be attributed to a number of circumstances to innocent Zumra, who will be fired ....
112	16	"Posredni Raskid (The Indecent Break-Up)"	1 May 2011
Ajna and Damir wake up in bed naked with red moans on their heads. They are scared they had sex, but Damir remembers that Barbara and he went to San Remo where Faruk came before them.There Damir and Faruk meet their old hearts.Senada and Mirna.Barbara got angry like Ajna after Mirna tried to kiss Damir in the restroom.In Damir's doctor office Mirna still tries to kiss him.Barbara came to see Damir.Barbara sees again how the broken flirtation does not get along.Later the men compliment about Ajna.They tell Damir to do it.Damir is scared.Barbara hears them thinking it is Barbara.Damir does not remember a thing no more. But Ajna remembers how they ended up on the bed with moans. She tries to open a stuck drawer.She opens the drawer but hits Damir.The drawer is stuck again.She opens it but she got the red moan. Note:This episode shows Ajna's softness.
113	17	"Gore-Dole (Up, Then Down)"	8 May 2011
Senada and Faruk try to get out of town. Barbara is sick of that Damir and she always do everyday same things. She replies "When i always make up, you read news. It's like the 80's" then Damir takes her out to dinner. Džema is left alone in the elevator. Izet finds him.Samir takes the car and brings it to Faruk. The police arrests Faruk for a car-steal.
114	18	"Lijeva Cipela (The Left Shoe)"	15 May 2011
Samir has stolen left shoes from the shop and sold it to Izet because he hadn't got any place in his garage.
115	19	"Fotografija Ričardsa Kejta (Keith Richard's Photograph)"	22 May 2011
Izet has set on fire Faruk's picture of Keith Richard, which was important to Faruk. Because of it, Faruk destroyed Izet's picture of Tito, then Izet has thrown Damir's new LG phone from window, thinking that it is Faruk's thing for music.
116	20	"Egzorcizam (The Exorcism)"	29 May 2011
In order to get rid of Šukrija and Ajna - Izet, Faruk and Damir come up with a plan called Exorcism, in which Faruk would have AIDS and cause major panic among Ajna (since she is his girlfriend) and Šukrija, causing both of them to move back to Split. Meanwhile, Refko and Čombe, in order to get some money, decide to film a wedding (which didn't turn out to be such a good idea), after which they decide to film a funeral. The episode ends in Faruk's appearance in the local café San Remo just after all of the people have found out he has AIDS.
117	21	"Hipnoza (Hypnotherapy Session)"	5 June 2011
Izet tries to stop smoking, and he has gone to the hypnotist in Dubrovnik. Meanwhile, Čombe and Refko are trying to get some money, so they have founded hidden camera, and later hidden microphone.
118	22	"Rođendan (The Birthday Party)"	12 June 2011
Faruk and his love interest Bojana have birthday on the same day. Meanwhile, Zumra gets fired because of peeling potatoes with Ajna's used shaver.
119	23	"Prison Break"	19 June 2011
Faruk is arrested for tax evasion concerning radio station Accord. In jail he is desperate to get out after another inmate wants to have sexual relationship with him. He is desperate and calls Izet for help but Izet has no money, while this is going on Damir is having doubts about his wife's whereabouts, coming home late every night. Izet suspects that Damir wife is sleeping with someone else and goes to Damir to confront him and in turn they start drinking very late in the morning. Izet calls Refija to look after Dzema (Damirs son). Fast forward to 5AM Izet and Damir are in the casino they end getting lucky and win lot of money. While this is going on scene Damir's wife is shown in bed with another man as she tells him she wants to go with him to Hollywood. In the morning Damir comes to his apartment confronts his wife and accuses her of cheating, Izet calls Faruk to tell him they have the money. Damir comes over to Izets so they can go and bail Faruk out forgetting the suitcase full of money in his apartment, while he is at Izet's his wife opens the suitcase sees the large amount of money decides to call her new man and she steals all the money. Damir comes back to the suitcase finds it empty with note written thanks. He lets Izet know who ends up going crazy and wants to kill him. Damir's wife is shown at airport with unknown guy waiting for flight to Los Angeles. Meanwhile Damir and Izet are at San Remos drinking suddenly Faruk enters the door and thanks them for bailing him out of prison, which confuses they since they didn't have the money after it got stolen. Without Fazlinovic knowledge, Maria, the owner of San Remo, is the one that paid for Faruk's fine.
120	24	"Povratak Na Staro (Back to the Old Ways)"	26 June 2011
There is a review of the past season and some major changes in the lifes of the Fazlinovic clan. This is the last episode for season 2011. In ironic way the Fazlinovic clan comes full circle to the beginning. All four of them including Dzema (damir's son) are sitting at the kitchen table. Once again Fazlinovic clan of Izet, Faruk and Damir have no luck with women.

=== Season 5 (2012–2013) ===
No. overall	No. in season	Title	Original release date
121	1	"Prvi put sa pradedom u školu (First Day of School, with Great-Grandfather)"	29 January 2012
Fights ensue between Damir and Izet, when Izet finds out Džebra is registered for a religious class.
122	2	"Ima nešto u Saneli (There's Something About Sanela)"	5 February 2012
Faruk wants to make a video featuring their housemaid, Sanela, but Damir wants her to himself.
123	3	"Zgodna žena (Pretty Woman)"	12 February 2012
Džebra has a parent-teacher interview. Everyone suddenly wants to go, when they see Džebra's teacher.
124	4	"Nepodnošljiva lakoća primanja"	19 February 2012
A man named Jovan Belajbej seeks out to find Izet, so he can make an artistic sculpture for money. Čombe begins to think that he is becoming gay.
125	5	"Gluvarenje"	26 February 2012
Izet must paint a theme for a gay community poster, led by Belajbeg.
126	6	"Riba zvana Vanja (A Girl Named Vanja)"	4 March 2012
Izet's painting is vandalized. Damir and Marija are led to believe that Faruk is in love with a man named Vanja, speculating that Faruk is gay. Actually, Faruk is in love with woman with the same name.
127	7	"Spolovi rano lete (Genders Fly Early)"	11 March 2012
Izet and Džebra want to play Sony PlayStation but it is too expensive, so they trick Damir into buying them one.
128	8	"Dobar, loš, zao (The Good, the Bad, and the Ugly)"	18 March 2012
Izet's school rival, Atif Đukelić, appears, and Izet wants to make him pay. Marija starts to make Mamur Čorba, which everyone likes.
129	9	"Iz Rusije s ljubavlju (From Russia, With Love)"	25 March 2012
Faruk thinks his friend Igi, who has just died, took his Rolling Stones - Playing with Fire track, when Izet is actually at blame.
130	10	"Tri kralja (The Three Kings)"	1 April 2012
The family is led to believe that they are all chasing the same girl.
131	11	"Umri muški (Die Hard)"	8 April 2012
Nevena and Barbara together went back to Sarajevo. They are both thinking that Fazlinovići are in love with Jakov's mother Olga, who moved in next to Fazlinovići.
132	12	"Seks, laži i video trake (Sex, Lies, and Videotapes)"	15 April 2012
Damir and Barbara are at war because of Džema. Meanwhile, Čombe has founded a solo band and earned a lot of money.
133	13	"Nemoralna ponuda (Indecent Proposal)"	22 April 2012
Izet, Faruk and Damir get scabies because of Čombe's "happy shirt"
134	14	"Dnevnik jedne šiparice"	29 April 2012
Damir found Faruk drunk and he granted him Izet's wishes.
135	15	"Twins"	6 May 2012
Izet's twin brother visits.
136	16	"Savršena oluja (Perfect Storm)"	1 January 2013
137	17	"Utjerivači duhova (Ghostbusters)"	21 January 2013
138	18	"Kišni čovjek (The Rain Man)"	25 January 2013
139	19	"Starac ga more (Old Man Did The Sea)"	26 January 2013
140	20	"Presjedničke laži (Presidential Lies)"	1 February 2013
141	21	"Brzi i žestoki (Fast And Furious)"	17 March 2013
Izet speeds his car to 150km/h and crosses over the red light. His driver license is deducted, but later is given back to him.
142	22	"Opravdano ubistvo (Justified Murder)"	24 March 2013
143	23	"Duboko grlo (Deep Throat)"	31 March 2013
144	24	"Put na sjever (Travel to north)"	7 April 2013
This was supposed to be the last episode of the series in which Izet's twin brother buys him three airplane tickets to Sweden (one for him, Faruk and Damir). The episode ends with the supposed death of Izet, Faruk and Damir in a plane crash on the way to Sweden, but an after credit scene of the news program FTV indicated their survival of the plane crash by saying that 3 passengers never went on board the airplane.

=== Season 6 (2014–2015) ===
No. overall	No. in season	Title	Original release date
145	1	"Ako prijatelji i rodbina ne očekuju tvoj povratak, onda tvoje nepokretnosti lako mogu dobiti noge. Nije mudro organizovati rođendan bez slavljenika, niti sahranu bez pokojnika (If your friends and family does not expect you to come back, then your immovability can easily get legs.Its not wise to organize a birthday without the celebrant, nor a funeral without the dead.)"	3 November 2014
Everyone thinks that Fazlinovići are dead, so Samir and Barbara are trying to sell Izet's apartment and to get some money.
146	2	"Trebaš se dobro zabrinuti ako naletiš na kugara, pogotovo ako ti se otac u isto vrijeme zabavlja sa klavirom"	3 November 2014
Izet gets a piano from Samir.
147	3	"Nije se problem skinuti go, naročito ako te niko ne vidi. Pravni sustav je nakaradan - lakše je izaći iz zatvora, nego ući u njega"	5 November 2014
Izet and Samir are arrested because of piano, which Samir has actually stolen from someone.
148	4	"Čak i ako priznaš 86 krivičnih dijela, ne mora značiti da ćeš odgovarati za njih. Naravno, to nema baš puno veze niti sa dodjelom starateljstva, niti sa časovima klavira (Even if you plead guilty for 86 criminal offenses, it does not mean that you will answer for them.Of course, that does not have a lot in common with granting custody, nor with piano lessons.)"	10 November 2014
Barbara moves in Fazlinovići's house, and becomes their new maid. Lada, Džema's piano teacher, moves in Fazlinovići's house too.
149	5	"Kada si u autu, pravi se Englez. A ako produciraš igranu seriju, dobro pazi da ti neko od ukućana ne dođe na probno snimanje i da, zbog ukradene kamere, ne završiš u prdekani"	11 November 2014
150	6	"Nikada ne bježi iz prdekane, to je najbolji put da te opet uhapse. I zapamti da je spasavati propao brak, isto kao oživljavati leš (Never escape from jail, that is the best way to end up in jail again.And remember that saving a failed marriage, is same as reving a corpse.)"	12 November 2014
151	7	"Ne vjeruj slijepcu koji vidi, a prije važnog poslovnog sastanka budi oprezan sa koktelima od medikamenata. Kada je odlazak na bazen u pitanju, također oprez nije na odmet"	17 November 2014
152	8	"Ako si paranoik, to ne znači da te proganjaju, isto kao sto kod hipohondra nije isključena mogućnost da ima rak. Moj brajko, snimati pilot epizodu nije mačiji kašalj"	18 November 2014
153	9	"Ako laže koza, ne laže DNK. Uzgred, džeparenje je trka na 400 metara sa preponama, nikad ne smiješ stati"	19 November 2014
154	10	"Ako je dijete agresivno, to ne mora biti veliki problem, možda samo uživa kada nanosi bol drugima. Sumnja je sasvim dovoljan povod da se nekoga proglasi homoseksualcem, pa makar je to on i stvarno"	24 November 2014
155	11	"Tačno je da plastična operacija može podmladiti ženu, ali je isto tako istina da nakon plastične operacije žena može biti čak i ljepša. Utjerivanje dugova je legalan posao, jedini je problem što nije zakonit"	25 November 2014
156	12	"Osnovni uzrok za razvode je brak. Da nema brakova, ne bi bilo ni razvoda. Kad već pripadaš ljepšem spolu, šta te rukovodi da želiš biti ružniji? (The root cause of divorce is marriage.If there weren't marriages, there would not be a divorce.When you already belong to a better looking gender, what drives you to be uglier.)"	26 November 2014
157	13	"Igrana serija nema puno veze sa metalurgijom, ali se krađa scenarija ipak smatra industrijskom špijunažom. Mada semantički vuku isti korijen, polaganje vozačkog i polaganje kamen temeljca, nemaju nikakve veze"	1 December 2014
Kufe gets driver license.
158	14	"Ne treba vjerovati rođacima, naročito kada lažu. A ako vani pada pljusak, velika je vjerovatnoća da je vrijeme oblačno"	2 December 2014
159	15	"Ako dovoljno često prisluškuješ tuđe razgovore, može ti se desiti da čuješ i nešto korisno. Istina i laž, kao nebo i zemlja, ipak se susretnu tamo negdje na horizontu"	3 December 2014
160	16	"Nije problem ostaviti alkohol, problem je šta raditi ako ne piješ? Ako znaš gdje se krije, onda nije problem pronaći osobu koja je nestala"	20 March 2015
161	17	"Ako imaš odnos sa snahinom majkom, to nije incest, ali je ipak ugodno. Za lihvarenje je potrebno dvoje, a poželjno je da bar jedno bude tokmak"	21 March 2015
162	18	"Iako je imenica "salo" semantički korijen muškog imena "Salko", neko ko se tako zove ne mora biti debeo. Ako čovjeku uvrijediš ono njemu najvrjednije, niko ti ne može oduzeti šamar koji ti pripada"	22 March 2015
163	19	"Ako imaš problema sa memorijom, jedi što više bijelog luka. Ako ništa, bar će ti smrditi iz usta. Nekad je bolje da ti kasniš, nego da tebe čekaju"	27 March 2015
164	20	"Na svaki mogući način treba izbjeći tužbu, pa makar se problem riješio i mimo suda. Nakon svega, poljubiti se sa konjem i nije tako grozna stvar"	28 March 2015
165	21	"Sastanak na slijepo je kao i vožnja auta na slijepo: možeš voziti, ali vrlo vjerovatno nećeš daleko dobaciti. Ne kaže se u narodu džaba: jednom kenjac, vazda magare"	29 March 2015
166	22	"Dobro otvori oči ako koristiš slušalice sa wireless kablom. Možda kontejneri za smeće izgledaju neprizorno, ali to ne znači da ih je lijepo vidjeti"	30 March 2015
167	23	"Muškarci lakše podnose porod nego hemeroidne tegobe. Ako nisi siguran da li si u snu ili na javi, nazovi Pamelu Anderson i pitaj je da ima seks sa tobom. Ako pristane, nemoj se buditi!"	31 March 2015
168	24	"Neke odluke u životu je najbolje presjeći nožem. Recimo, šnitu kruha. Potpuno se ista medicina praktikuje na zapadu i kod nas. Ali ako su medicinske sestre Šveđanke, onda treba preferirati švedsku bolnicu"	1 April 2015

=== Season 7 (2015) ===
No. overall	No. in season	Title	Original release date
169	1	"Neimar, Španac i brat"	5 April 2015
170	2	"Scenarist, glumci i vjetrovi (Screenwriters, actors and winds)"	6 April 2015
171	3	"Pijanac, ubistvo i pas (A drunkard, murder and a dog)"	7 April 2015
172	4	"Gips, televizija i sponzoruša"	8 April 2015
173	5	"Nepuša, sarma i deložacija"	11 April 2015
174	6	"Renesansa, zemljotres i psihologija"	12 April 2015
175	7	"Pijanstvo, voajerstvo i starateljstvo"	13 April 2015
176	8	"Avion, pištolj i banka (Airplane, gun and a bank)"	14 April 2015
177	9	"Dnevnik, kraljica i smrt"	15 April 2015
178	10	"Papiga, cirkus i potkrovlje"	18 April 2015
179	11	"Ruža, mobitel i demencija"	19 April 2015
180	12	"Infantilnost, zaljubljenost i internet"	20 April 2015
181	13	"Mjesečnica, svećnjak i tanc"	21 April 2015
182	14	"Drama, fotografija i raskid (Drama, photo and a breakup)"	22 April 2015
183	15	"Glumac, Kraljević i holesterol"	25 April 2015
184	16	"Rođendan, dijagnostika i SUBNOR"	26 April 2015
185	17	"Tripice, samoubistvo i bijelo odjelo"	27 April 2015
186	18	"Fokus, hazard i smrt"	28 April 2015
187	19	"Most, matura i alarm (Bridge, prom and an alarm)"	29 April 2015
188	20	"Jagnje, jare i ubistvo"	2 May 2015
189	21	"Pinokio, trudnoća i gerijatrija"	3 May 2015
190	22	"Advokat, odvjetnik i zanovjetnik (Lawyer, lawyer and a lawyer) (All words mean lawyer)"	8 May 2015
191	23	"Ljubav, trice i prošlost"	9 May 2015
192	24	"Uvod, viseća litica i bljesak unazad"	10 May 2015

=== Season 8 (2015) ===
No. overall	No. in season	Title	Original release date
193	1	"Poštar je donio paket, ali niko ne zna za koga je poklon"	15 May 2015
194	2	"Faruk jo totalno puk'o, a Izet i Damir pokušavaju da mu pomognu"	16 May 2015
195	3	"Faruk je prolupao čak i više nego u prethodnoj epizodi, a Izet ganja puha"	17 May 2015
196	4	"Damir donio iz podruma projektor, a Faruku je u posjetu došao stari drug"	22 May 2015
197	5	"Kada Izet folira da snima seriju, a Refko se bori sa veličinom organa"	23 May 2015
198	6	"Izet ne bi da se Damir ženi, a Fufe ulazi u turizam na velika vrata"	24 May 2015
199	7	"Mada njihov život jeste reality show, Faruku realno prijeti godina robije"	29 May 2015
200	8	"Nova godina kuca na vratima 1"	3 November 2015
201	9	"Nova godina kuca na vratima 2"	4 November 2015
202	10	"Faruka se namjerio na doktorku, a Izet na sač"	6 October 2015
203	11	"Izet je u ratarskom biznisu, a Faruk se navukao na lijepak"	7 October 2015
204	12	"Faruk je konačno doguran do psihijatra, a Izet do dobitne kombinacije"	12 October 2015
205	13	"Trči, Faruk, trči"	13 October 2015
206	14	"Faruk je Banja Luka, a Izet Če Gevara"	14 October 2015
207	15	"Faruk je u potrazi za prijateljima, a Izet za preljubnicima"	17 October 2015
208	16	"Dok jedni žongliraju, drugi skijaju"	19 October 2015
209	17	"Terminator boluje od hipohondrije"	20 October 2015
210	18	"Faruk se potvrđuje kao ekspert za žene, a Izet za kućne pomoćnice"	21 October 2015
211	19	"Izet se posvetio vjeri, a Faruk Suadi"	24 October 2015
212	20	"Rat do zadnje kapi maksuzije"	26 October 2015
213	21	"Dupla votka sa jednom kriškom limuna, dvije kocke leda i malo badema da se zamezi"	27 October 2015
214	22	"U ratu neprijatelji, u miru još veći"	28 October 2015
Mahmut again came to Faruk to record video for his songs, but something really unexpected happened.
215	23	"Kasting je Izetovo teško breme"	31 October 2015
216	24	"Odlazak Eskima"	2 November 2015

=== Season 9 (2015–2016) ===
No. overall	No. in season	Title	Original release date
217	1	"Sred pušaka bajoneta"	3 November 2015
218	2	"Straže oko nas"	4 November 2015
219	3	"Tiho kreće naša četa"	7 November 2015
220	4	"Kroz Bilečki kras"	8 November 2015
221	5	"Čuje se odjek koraka"	9 November 2015
222	6	"Po kamenju hercegovskom"	10 November 2015
223	7	"Hej, haj, hoj! Hej, haj, hoj!"	11 November 2015
224	8	"Daleko si zavičaju"	16 November 2015
225	9	"Mi prognani smo"	17 November 2015
226	10	"Prognaše nas zbog zločina"	18 November 2015
227	11	"Što te ljubimo"	21 November 2015
228	12	"Kroz progonstvo i trpljenje"	23 November 2015
229	13	"Kroz tamnice mrak"	24 November 2015
230	14	"Dolazi nam novi život"	25 November 2015
231	15	"Čujte mu korak"	30 November 2015
232	16	"Konjuh planinom vjetar šumi, bruji"	1 December 2015
233	17	"Lišće pjeva žalovite pjesme"	2 December 2015
234	18	"Javori i jele, borovi i breze"	7 December 2015
235	19	"Svijaju se jedno do drugoga"	8 December 2015
236	20	"Noć je šumu svu u crno zavila"	9 December 2015
237	21	"Konjuh stenje, rusi se kamenje"	25 December 2015
238	22	"Mrtvoga drugara, husinjskog rudara"	28 December 2015
239	23	"Sahranjuje četa proletera"	1 January 2016
240	24	"Kiše jesenje po grobu su lile"	25 June 2016

=== Season 10 (2016) ===
No. overall	No. in season	Title	Original release date
241	1	"Iver ne pada daleko..."	26 June 2016
242	2	"Šuga i ljubav ne mogu se sakriti"	27 June 2016
243	3	"Bolje vrabac u ruci, nego golub na balkonu"	28 June 2016
244	4	"adava je dobro sjeme, kad je rđavo oranje"	29 June 2016
245	5	"Ko prije đevojci njemu đevojka"	30 June 2016
246	6	"Osveta je najbolja kada se servira vrela"	1 July 2016
247	7	"Ko visoko leti..."	2 July 2016
248	8	"Zdrav čovjek ima hiljadu želja.."	3 July 2016
249	9	"...bolestan samo 999"	4 July 2016
250	10	"U laži su kratke noge"	5 July 2016
251	11	"Ako žive skupa, životinje se zavole, a ljudi se zamrze"	6 July 2016
252	12	"Dobro je teško vidjeti, a lako se pozna"	7 July 2016
253	13	"Kad čovjek tone i za vrelo gvožđe se hvata"	8 July 2016
254	14	"Gdje žena buči, tu muško muči"	9 July 2016
255	15	"Dok je raje i muka, biće i hajduka"	10 July 2016
256	16	"Žena treba da je što gluplja, a drvo što tvrđe"	11 July 2016
257	17	"Bogatstvo mijenja ćud, rijetko na bolje"	12 July 2016
258	18	"Jezik laže, srce istinu kaže"	13 July 2016
259	19	"Gladan pas i na gazdu laje"	14 July 2016
260	20	"Bolje svoje jaje nego tuđa kokoš"	15 July 2016
261	21	"Daj mi znanje, daću ti imanje"	16 July 2016
262	22	"Bez starca nema udarca"	17 July 2016
263	23	"Žedan konj vode ne probira"	18 July 2016
264	24	"Bolje mrtav pijan, nego mrtav trijezan"	19 July 2016

=== Season 11 (2020) ===
No. overall	No. in season	Title	Original release date
265	1	"Ko te rodi takvoga!"	17 February 2020
266	2	"Čemu mijenjati dobre navike"	18 February 2020
267	3	"Ko će ako nećemo mi"	19 February 2020
268	4	"Dva puta su mi juče bježali"	20 February 2020
269	5	"Vidjet ćete, to je dama par ekselans"	24 February 2020
270	6	"Maksuzija, daje ti krila!"	25 February 2020
271	7	"Živimo ovdje kao časne sestre"	26 February 2020
272	8	"Treba bježati od kokuznih čvaka"	27 February 2020
273	9	"Mališa, mališa, bokca ti tvoga"	2 March 2020
274	10	"Mali će položiti anatomiju, to je računaj završeno"	3 March 2020
275	11	"U šumi bukvi on je zagrlio javor"	4 March 2020
276	12	"Kokuzluk je prelazna bolest"	5 March 2020
277	13	"Imaš reflekse ko pečena riba"	9 March 2020
278	14	"Nisam ja nervozan, ja samo unosim nervozu"	10 March 2020
279	15	"Veliki je taj švedski džemat"	11 March 2020
280	16	"Jel to već hvala Bogu idete?"	12 March 2020
281	17	"Pijan u Busovači, isto trijezan u Hanoveru"	13 March 2020
282	18	"U Austriji ima da budemo agresivni!"	16 March 2020
283	19	"Može misionarski, a može i neka druga pozicija"	17 March 2020
284	20	"Umjereno do pretežno normalno"	18 March 2020
285	21	"Šta ti je vrijeme uradilo, pa njega ubijaš?"	20 March 2020
286	22	"Samo me promućkaš, opet sam pijan"	23 March 2020
287	23	"Sunce vam kalajisano terorističko!"	24 March 2020
288	24	"U frižider ću sjesti i brijati se"	25 March 2020

=== Season 12 (2020–2021) ===
No. overall	No. in season	Title	Original release date
289	1	"Palo je tržište maltezera u čabar"	26 March 2020
290	2	"U tvojim godinama kosti teško zarastaju"	10 April 2021
291	3	"Nikada nije luđa vojska zemljom marširala"	11 April 2021
292	4	"Mene sve zaobiđe izuzev budala"	17 April 2021
293	5	"Tačno ima da poludim normalno"	18 April 2021
294	6	"Trava počela po glavi da mi raste"	24 April 2021
295	7	"Pare su ti jedno obično bogatstvo"	1 May 2021
296	8	"Trebaju mi subjektove usrane gaće i smrdljive čarape"	8 May 2021
297	9	"Ja sam potpuno izgubila konce"	15 May 2021
298	10	"Dani su crni da crnji ne mogu biti"	19 July 2021
299	11	"Dobro je biti trijezan, ali dosadno"	20 July 2021
300	12	"Tata ti je nekakav nikakav i kaharli"	21 July 2021

=== Season 13 (2021) ===
No. overall	No. in season	Title	Original release date
301	1	"Ljuta hrana dva puta peče"	10 September 2021
302	2	"Kakva divna demonstracija sile"	13 September 2021
303	3	"Moj rektalni integritet bi u zatvoru bio ugrožen"	14 September 2021
304	4	"Nema zakona da leš čovjeka ne smije biti u kuhinji"	15 September 2021
305	5	"Sve se pravnim putem može riješiti"	16 September 2021
306	6	"Meho da ga zašarafa na zid"	17 September 2021
307	7	"Halo, Džordan, haj molim te malo tamo na pomoćni teren!"	8 November 2021
308	8	"Jedva sam ga zamjetio u šumici"	9 November 2021
309	9	"Obećavam da ću od Miljacke napraviti Neretvu"	10 November 2021
