= Charuga =

- Croatian: Čaruga
- Directed by: Rajko Grlić
- Written by: Rajko Grlić
- Based on: Čaruga by Ivan Kušan
- Produced by: Vesna Mort; Mladen Koceić
- Starring: Ivo Gregurević; Davor Janjić; Branislav Lečić
- Cinematography: Slobodan Trninić
- Edited by: Andrija Zafranović
- Music by: Goran Bregović
- Distributed by: Facets Multimedia Distribution (video)
- Release date: 11 April 1991
- Running time: 108 minutes
- Countries: Yugoslavia (coproduction of Croatia and Slovenia)
- Languages: Croatian; Serbian
- Budget: $1 million

Charuga (Croatian: Čaruga) is a 1991 Yugoslav film directed by Rajko Grlić. Based on the novel by Ivan Kušan, it tells a true story about legendary Slavonian bandit Jovo Stanisavljević Čaruga.

During its premiere, Charuga was described as "the last Yugoslav film", because its theatrical run coincided with the process of the Yugoslav break-up and escalation of conflict into the Croatian War of Independence.

Others saw film as an allegoric portrayal of the rise and fall of Communism, because the film's protagonist (played by Ivo Gregurević) used Communism as a pretext to get rich and enjoy luxurious lifestyle.
