= Aleksandar Seksan =

Bosnian actor (born 1968)

- Born: 24 August 1968 (age 58); Sarajevo, SR Bosnia and Herzegovina, SFR Yugoslavia
- Education: Academy of Performing Arts in Sarajevo
- Occupation: Actor
- Years active: 1997–present

Aleksandar Seksan (born 24 August 1968) is a Bosnian actor. He has appeared in more than thirty films since 1997. Most notably, he starred in the 2003 multiple award-winning Bosnian film Remake and 2016 Bosnian film Death in Sarajevo.

== Selected filmography ==
=== Film ===
Year	Title	Role	Notes
2003	Summer in the Golden Valley	Cico	
2003	Remake	Miro Jovanović	
2007	It's Hard to Be Nice	Mrki	
2012	Children of Sarajevo	Rizo	
2015	Our Everyday Life	Slaviša	
2016	Death in Sarajevo	Enco	
2018	Good Day's Work	Armin	

=== Television ===
Year	Title	Role	Notes
2010–2015; 2020–present	Lud, zbunjen, normalan	Private inspector Đido Mova	
2013–2014	Kriza	Zrinko Parkaš-Kifla	

== Personal life ==
Seksan converted to Islam and talked about it.
