= It's Hard to Be Nice =

It's Hard to be Nice
- Theatrical release poster
- Directed by: Srđan Vuletić
- Written by: Srđan Vuletić
- Produced by: Ademir Kenović
- Starring: Saša Petrović; Daria Lorenci; Emir Hadžihafizbegović; Senad Bašić; Aleksandar Seksan
- Cinematography: Slobodan Trninić
- Edited by: Andrija Zafranović
- Music by: Srđan Kurpjel, Saša Lošić
- Release dates: 2007 (Bosnia); 10 April 2008 (Netherlands)
- Running time: 102 minutes
- Countries: Bosnia and Herzegovina, Slovenia, Serbia, Germany
- Language: Bosnian

It's Hard to be Nice (Original title in Bosnian: Teško je biti fin) is a 2007 Bosnian film by Srđan Vuletić. The movie is about a man who lives in a challenging, post-war Bosnia and Herzegovina where many are forced to create their own destinies. Fudo, a taxi driver who lives in Sarajevo with his wife and a newborn baby, is pressured by his wife to turn his life around from being associated with local and regional mafia. He firmly adheres and acts to change to an honest family man bound by goodness and peace. However, the challenging events that follow bring his family and his life to a severe test.

== Cast ==
- Saša Petrović as Fudo
- Daria Lorenci as Azra
- Emir Hadžihafizbegović as Sejo
- Senad Bašić as Bato
- Aleksandar Seksan as Mrki
- Jasna Žalica as Nurse
- Izudin Bajrović as Doctor
- Damir Savić as Beba
- Miraj Grbić as Receptionist

== Awards and nominations ==
- The Heart of Sarajevo for the Best Actor (Saša Petrović) - Sarajevo Film Festival - 2007
