= Elmir Jukić =

Bosnian filmmaker (born 1971)

- Born: 1971 (age 54–55); Sarajevo, SR Bosnia and Herzegovina, SFR Yugoslavia
- Education: University of Sarajevo
- Occupations: Film director, screenwriter
- Years active: 1997–present

Elmir Jukić (born 1971) is a Bosnian film director and screenwriter.

He graduated from the directing department at the Academy of Performing Arts in Sarajevo in 1993. One of Jukić's most distinguished works as a director is the popular Bosnian sitcom Lud, zbunjen, normalan.

== Filmography ==
=== As actor ===
==== Film ====
Year	Title	Role	Notes
2002	10 Minutes	Soldier 2	Short film

=== Television ===
Year	Title	Role	Notes
2008	Lud, zbunjen, normalan	Director	Appeared in one episode in 2008

=== As director and writer ===
==== Film ====
Year	Title	Director	Writer	Producer	Notes
1998	Made in Sarajevo	Yes	Yes	No	Documentary film; co-directed with Dino Mustafić
2005	Ram za sliku moje domovine	Yes	Yes	No	Short film
2005	Majka	Yes	Yes	No	Short film
2017	The Frog	Yes	No	No	

==== Television ====
Year	Title	Director	Writer	Producer	Notes
2007–Present	Lud, zbunjen, normalan	Yes	No	No	Creator as well
2011	Dva smo svijeta različita	Yes	No	No	Creator as well
2013–2014	Kriza	Yes	No	No	
2016	Lažni svjedok	Yes	No	No	
2018	Ne diraj mi mamu	Yes	No	No	
2018–2019	Konak kod Hilmije	Yes	No	No	
2022–2023	Na rubu pameti	Yes	No	No	
2023–present	Radio Mileva	Yes	Yes	No	
