= Days and Hours =

2004 film

- Theatrical release poster
- Directed by: Pjer Žalica
- Written by: Namik Kabil
- Produced by: Ademir Kenović
- Starring: Senad Bašić; Mustafa Nadarević; Semka Sokolović-Bertok; Emir Hadžihafizbegović
- Music by: Saša Lošić
- Release date: 20 August 2004
- Running time: 93 minutes
- Country: Bosnia and Herzegovina
- Language: Bosnian

Days and Hours (Bosnian version title: Kod amidže Idriza) is a 2004 Bosnian film directed by Pjer Žalica and written by Namik Kabil. It was Bosnia and Herzegovina's submission to the 77th Academy Awards for the Academy Award for Best Foreign Language Film, but it was not nominated.

The film was released on 20 August 2004.

== Cast ==
- Senad Bašić as Fuke
- Mustafa Nadarević as Idriz
- Semka Sokolović-Bertok as Sabira
- Emir Hadžihafizbegović as Ekrem
- Jasna Žalica as Buba
- Nada Đurevska as Begzada
- Izudin Bajrović as Izudin
- Dragan Marinković as Muhamed
- Sanja Burić as Šejla
- Enis Bešlagić as a youngster from the neighbourhood

== See also ==
- List of submissions to the 77th Academy Awards for Best Foreign Language Film
