= Senad Bašić =

Bosnian actor (born 1962)

- Born: 26 August 1962 (age 64); Trebinje, PR Bosnia and Herzegovina, FPR Yugoslavia
- Education: Academy of Performing Arts; University of Sarajevo
- Occupations: Actor; comedian
- Years active: 1985–present
- Spouse: Jasna Bašić
- Children: 2

Senad Bašić (born 26 August 1962) is a Bosnian film, theater and television actor, and comedian. He also works as a professor at the Academy of Performing Arts in Sarajevo, specializing in acting.

Bašić graduated from the Academy of Performing Arts in 1987. He has appeared in many films, such as Holiday in Sarajevo (1991), The Perfect Circle (1997), Summer in the Golden Valley (2003), Days and Hours (2004), It's Hard to Be Nice (2007) and Bosnian Pot (2023).

Bašić gained later recognition for portraying the role of Faruk Fazlinović in the sitcom Lud, zbunjen, normalan from 2007 to 2016.

== Filmography ==
=== Film ===
Year	Title	Role	Notes
1985	I ti će proći	Filip	
1986	Skretničar uzanog kolosjeka	Radnik	
1988	Azra	Zijo	
1989	Hajde da se volimo 2	Zamjenik vatrogasnog komandira	
1991	Praznik u Sarajevu	Detective	
1997	Neočekivana šetnja	Senad	
1997	Territorio Comanche	Soldier #1	
1997	Welcome to Sarajevo	Dealer	
1997	Savršeni krug	Guard	
2003	Gori vatra	Velija	
2003	Ljeto u zlatnoj dolini	Ispijeni	
2004	Kod amidže Idriza	Fuke	
2006	Warchild	Samir	
2006	Nafaka	Sado	
2007	It's Hard to Be Nice	Bato	
2008	The Tour	General	
2012	Shanghai Gypsy	Ujas Mirga	
2013	Adria Blues	Toni Riff	
2014	Three Days in Sarajevo	Taxi driver	
2015	Sabina K.	Branko	
2018	I Act, I Am	Director	
2022	Praznik praznine	Sado	
2023	Bosnian pot	Faruk Šego	

=== Television ===
Year	Title	Role	Notes
1985	Audicija	Marko Kjajević	Television film;
1986	Znak	—	
1986	Mak i Zak	—	
1988	Zagubljen govor	—	2 episodes;
1988	Vizantija	Boris	Television film;
1991	Djelidba	Suljo Sejdić	Television film;
1992	Aleksa Šantić	Osvald	
2005	Gori vatra	Velija	3 episodes;
2007–2016	Lud, zbunjen, normalan	Faruk Fazlinović	Main role; 264 episodes
2011	Turneja	General	1 episode

== Awards ==
- Best young actor - Professional Actors Festival - 1989
- "Mala liska" award - Bosnian comedy festival "Mostar liska" - 2004

=== Nominations ===
- Golden Leopard (Best Actor) - 55th Locarno Film Festival - 2002
