= Jasna Žalica =

Bosnian actress

- Born: 1968 (age 57–58); Sarajevo, SR Bosnia and Herzegovina, SFR Yugoslavia
- Education: Academy of Performing Arts in Sarajevo
- Occupation: Actress
- Years active: 1997–present
- Spouse: Pjer Žalica (m. 1994)
- Children: 1

Jasna Žalica (born 1968) is a Bosnian actress. She has appeared in more than sixteen films since 1997.

== Personal life ==
Žalica is married to Bosnian director Pjer Žalica since 1994 and together they have a son Ismar born in 1995.

== Selected filmography ==
=== Film ===
Year	Title	Role	Notes
2003	Fuse	Hitka	
2004	Days and Hours	Buba	
2004	Midwinter Night's Dream	Jasna	
2006	Grbavica	Pelma	
2007	It's Hard to Be Nice	Nurse	
2009	The Lika Cinema	Joso's wife	
2010	The Woman with a Broken Nose	Jadranka	
2014	These Are the Rules	Maja	
2020	Koncentriši se, baba	Kika	
2022	Balada	Zafira	
2022	Praznik rada	Muma	

=== Television ===
Year	Title	Role	Notes
2007–2008; 2020–2021	Lud, zbunjen, normalan	Šefika	
