= Academy of Performing Arts, Sarajevo =

Institute in Sarajevo, Bosnia and Herzegovina

Academy of Performing Arts in Sarajevo
- Type: Faculty
- Established: 1981; 45 years ago
- Dean: Faruk Lončarević
- Administrative staff: 30
- Location: Sarajevo, Bosnia and Herzegovina
- Campus: Urban
- Website: www.asu.unsa.ba

The Academy of Performing Arts in Sarajevo (Bosnian: Akademija scenskih umjetnosti Sarajevo / Академија сценских умјетности Сарајево) is a faculty within the University of Sarajevo in Sarajevo, Bosnia and Herzegovina, dedicated to the performing arts.

== History ==
The Academy of Performing Arts in Sarajevo was officially opened in 1981 with the inaugural Department of Acting. This was followed by the opening of the Department of Directing in 1989, the Department of Dramaturgy in 1994 and the Department of Production in 2010.

An important segment of the academy's practice is its cooperation with the Open Stage "Obala", a prominent Sarajevo theater, where students present their works along with professional actors, directors and writers.

The need for the school arose because, according to data from the year 1981, Bosnia and Herzegovina theaters had around 180 employees of which only 24 had the appropriate academic qualifications. Therefore, it was decided to establish Academy for Performing Arts in Sarajevo which was open to students from Bosnia and Herzegovina and other republics of former Yugoslavia. Academy of Performing Arts officially started working on December 2, 1981.

In 2010, it was announced that the Sarajevo Canton and the Cantonal Development Institute would be funding the construction of a 10 million KM building and center for the Academy of Performing Arts, primarily because working conditions for students and faculty alike have been subpar for the past decade. Construction on the new 4,600 m^{2} (49,514 sq ft) center began in mid-2010 in the Centar Municipality.

== Notable alumni ==
Academy of Performing Arts in Sarajevo alumni include Oscar, Berlin Film Festival, and Cannes Film Festival award winners. Some of the distinguished alumni and staff include:

- Senad Bašić
- Branko Đurić
- Benjamin Filipović
- Miraj Grbić
- Emir Hadžihafizbegović, a Venice Horizons Award-winning actor
- Elmir Jukić
- Moamer Kasumović
- Ademir Kenović
- Emir Kusturica, a two-time Palme d'Or-winning director and screenwriter
- Zana Marjanović
- Snježana Martinović
- Helena Minić
- Haris Pašović
- Milan Pavlović
- Aleksandar Seksan
- Danis Tanović, an Oscar, Golden Globe, Silver Bear-winning director and screenwriter
- Alban Ukaj
- Pjer Žalica
- Jasna Žalica
- Jasmila Žbanić, a Golden Bear-winning screenwriter and director
