= Pjer Žalica =

Bosnian filmmaker

Pjer Žalica Пјер Жалица
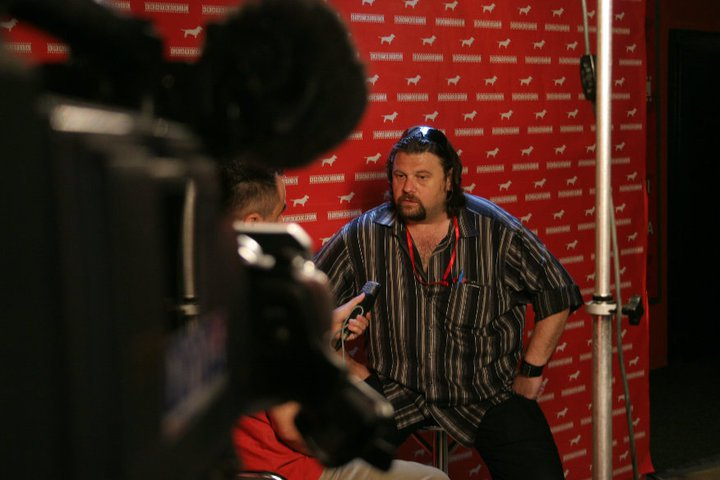
- Žalica at the Kratkofil International short film festival in 2007
- Born: 7 May 1964 (age 62); Sarajevo, SR Bosnia and Herzegovina, Yugoslavia
- Education: Academy of Performing Arts in Sarajevo
- Occupations: Film director, screenwriter
- Years active: 1994–present
- Spouse: Jasna Žalica
- Children: 1

Pjer Žalica (Serbo-Croatian Cyrillic: Пјер Жалица; born 7 May 1964) is a Bosnian film director, screenwriter and a professor at the Academy of Performing Arts in Sarajevo.

== Personal Life and Career ==
His father Miodrag (1926–1992) was a noted dramaturgist and poet who scripted several TV movies.

He has directed several short films, only one of which is (Mostar Sevdah Reunion 2000) as well as three feature films, Gori vatra (2003), and Kod amidže Idriza (2004).

In May 2008, he directed the music video for the duet Dabogda by Dino Merlin and Hari Mata Hari. In 2017, Žalica signed the Declaration on the Common Language of the Croats, Serbs, Bosniaks and Montenegrins.

He is married to Bosnian actress Jasna Žalica and has one child with the actress.

The screening of his film was canceled at the Berane Movie Theater because no tickets were sold.
