= List of Georgian Asia Pacific Screen Award winners and nominees =

This is a list of Georgian Asia Pacific Screen Awards winners and nominees. This list details the performances of Georgian actors, actresses, and films that have either been submitted or nominated for, or have won, an Asia Pacific Screen Award.

== Awards and nominations ==
| Year (Ceremony) | Award | Recipient | Result | Note | Ref. |
|---|---|---|---|---|---|
| 2011 (5th) | Best Documentary Feature Film | Bakhmaro | Nominated | Georgian-German co-production | |
| 2015 (9th) | Best Actor | Misha Gomiashvili; The President | Nominated | | |
| 2017 (11th) | APSA Jury Grand Prize | Scary Mother | Won | Georgian-Estonian co-production | |
| 2017 (11th) | Best Director | Ana Urushadze; Scary Mother | Nominated | | |
| 2017 (11th) | Best Actress | Nata Murvanidze; Scary Mother | Won | | |
| 2017 (11th) | Best Cinematography | Mindia Esadze; Scary Mother | Nominated | | |
| 2017 (11th) | Cultural Diversity Award (UNESCO) | Dede | Won | Georgian-Croatian-Dutch-Qatari-British co-production | |
| 2019 (13th) | Best Screenplay | Tamar Shavgulidze; Comets | Nominated | | |

- Nominations – 8
- Wins – 3

== See also ==
- List of Georgian submissions for the Academy Award for Best International Feature Film
