= Viktor Ivančić =

Croatian journalist

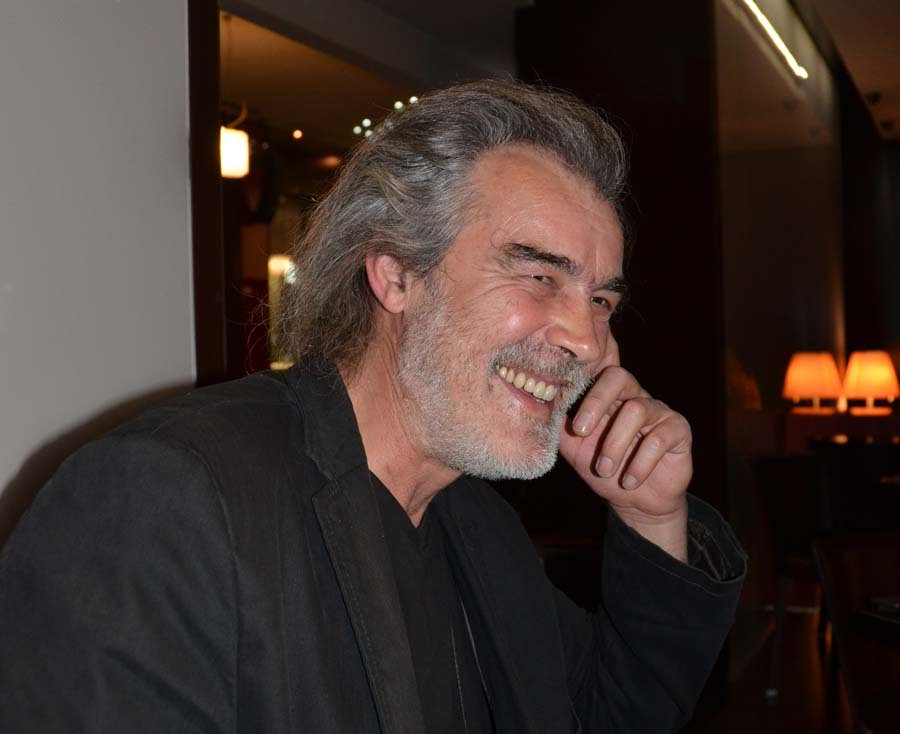
- Ivančić in 2015
- Born: 8 October 1960 (age 66); Sarajevo, PR Bosnia and Herzegovina, Yugoslavia
- Education: University of Zagreb
- Occupations: Journalist, television reporter

Viktor Ivančić (born 8 October 1960) is a Croatian journalist, best known as the founding member and long-time editor-in-chief of satirical weekly Feral Tribune.

A native of Split, Ivančić edited the student paper of the Faculty of Electrical Engineering, Mechanical Engineering and Naval Architecture, at the University of Split. He came to public spotlight in 1980s as a member of VIVA LUDEŽ, trio of young humourists who wrote for humour sections of Split newspapers and magazines like Slobodna Dalmacija, Nedjeljna Dalmacija and Omladinska Iskra. Those weekly supplements, which would ultimately become Feral Tribune, featured his regular column called Bilježnica Robija K. (Notebook of Robi K.), in which he gave satirical comments on important social and political events seen through the eyes of an elementary school pupil.

During the first years Croatian independence, Ivančić and Feral Tribune came into conflict with the government of Franjo Tuđman and his Croatian Democratic Union (HDZ). In early 1993 Slobodna Dalmacija was taken over by Miroslav Kutle, a businessman with close ties to Tuđman's right-hand man Gojko Šušak. As a result, Feral Tribune was removed from the pages of Split daily.

However, few months later, Feral Tribune appeared as bi-weekly, becoming weekly newspaper in December 1993. Viktor Ivančić became its editor-in-chief. During his tenure, the magazine was one of the first to openly criticise the government, expose war crimes committed by Croatian Army, as well as HDZ role in the most controversial aspects of privatisation and other scandals.

Ivančić received high praise from his peers for his efforts and received many prestigious journalism awards. Tuđman's government, on the other hand, reacted with the campaign that included controversial pornography taxes, defamation of characters of suits, criminal charges against Feral staff and economic sabotage through government-friendly businesses. Some of it was directed at Ivančić himself. Soon after receiving public death threat from top HDZ officials, Ivančić was mobilised into Croatian Army on 31 December 1993. He was released from Army – which he served in 4th Guards Brigade – in short time, following series of international protests.

In the late 1990s, Ivančić ceased to be Ferals editor-in-chief, but he continued to work in the magazine as columnist. Some of his columns were later published as books. In 2007 he received the prize "Archivio Disarmo - Golden Doves for Peace" awarded by IRIAD. After Feral Tribune ceased to exist in 2008, he join the national weekly newspaper Novosti where he still writes regularly as a columnist.

In 2017, Ivančić has signed the Declaration on the Common Language of the Croats, Serbs, Bosniaks and Montenegrins.

== Bibliography ==
- The Robi K. notebook (1995)
- Dot on the letter U (1998)
- Bonfire for the anti-Croatian adultery (2003)
- Slapping the wind (2003)
- Vita activa (2005)
- Robi K. stories (2006)
- Animal Croatica (2007)
- Mountain air (2009)
- Why I dont write and other essays (2010)
- Robi K.- The third onslaught (2011)
- Yugoslavia lives forever (2011)
- Workers and peasants (2015)
- Playing to the middle course (2015)

== Filmography ==
Year	Film	Director	Co-writer	Notes
2025	The Pavilion	Dino Mustafić	Emir Imamovic Pirke	It will open 31st Sarajevo Film Festival

== See also ==
- Petar Luković
- Boris Dežulović
