= Heart of Sarajevo =

Heart of Sarajevo Srce Sarajeva / Срце Сарајева
- Location: Sarajevo
- Country: Bosnia and Herzegovina
- Presented by: Sarajevo Film Festival
- First award: 1995
- Currently held by: Everytime, Sandra Wollner by Sandra Wollner
- Website: www.sff.ba

The Heart of Sarajevo (Bosnian, Croatian and Serbian: Srce Sarajeva / Срце Сарајева) is the highest prize awarded in all the competition categories at the Sarajevo Film Festival.

== Heart of Sarajevo ==
The official Heart of Sarajevo have been awarded since 2004, and the 10th anniversary of the Sarajevo Film Festival. Its design, as a visual identity for the festival, was chosen in 2004 from the shape that has been in informal circulation since the very beginning of the festival in the early 1990s, a heart designed by French fashion designer Agnès Andrée Marguerite Troublé a.k.a. Agnès B., a friend and patron of the Sarajevo Film Festival. The awards for 31st Sarajevo Film Festival were announced on 22 August 2025.

=== Heart of Sarajevo Award for Best Feature Film ===
Year	Film	Original title	Director(s)	Nationality of director
1996	Breaking the Waves	Breaking the Waves	Lars von Trier	Denmark
1997	My Life in Pink	Ma Vie en Rose	Alain Berliner	Belgium
1998	I Stand Alone	Seul contre tous	Gaspar Noé	France
1999	December 1–31	Dezember, 1-31	Jan Peters	Germany
2000	Bleeder	Bleeder	Nicolas Winding Refn	Denmark
2001	No Man's Land	Ničija zemlja	Danis Tanović	Bosnia and Herzegovina
2002	Saturday	Sábado	Juan Villegas	Argentina
2003	Fuse	Gori vatra	Pjer Žalica	Bosnia and Herzegovina
2004	Mila from Mars	Mila ot Mars	Zornitsa Sofia	Bulgaria
2005	Lady Zee	Leydi Zi	Georgi Djulgerov	Bulgaria
2006	Fraulein	Das Fräulein	Andrea Staka	Switzerland
2007	Takva: A Man's Fear of God	Takva	Özer Kızıltan	Turkey
2008	Buick Riviera	Buick Riviera	Goran Rušinović	Croatia
2009	Ordinary People	Obični ljudi	Vladimir Perišić	Serbia
2010	Tilva Roš	Tilva Roš	Nikola Ležaić	Serbia
2011	Breathing	Atmen	Karl Markovics	Austria
2012	Everybody in Our Family	Toată lumea din familia noastră	Radu Jude	Romania
2013	In Bloom	Grdzeli nateli dgheebi	Nana Ekvtimishvili and Simon Groß	Georgia
2014	Song of My Mother	Annemin Şarkısı	Erol Mintaş	Turkey
2015	Mustang	Mustang	Deniz Gamze Ergüven	Turkey
2016	Album	Albüm	Mehmet Can Mertoğlu	Turkey
2017	Scary Mother	Sashishi deda	Ana Urushadze	Georgia
2018	Ága	Ága	Milko Lazarov	Bulgaria
2019	Take Me Somewhere Nice	Odvedi me na neko lijepo mjesto	Ena Sendijarević	Bosnia and Herzegovina
2020	Exile	Exil	Visar Morina	Kosovo
2021	Great Freedom	Große Freiheit	Sebastian Meise	Austria
2022	Safe Place	Sigurno mjesto	Juraj Lerotić	Croatia
2023	Blackbird Blackbird Blackberry	Shashvi shashvi maq'vali	Elene Naveriani	Georgia
2024	Three Kilometres to the End of the World	Trei kilometri până la capătul lumii	Emanuel Parvu	Romania
2025	Wind, Talk to Me	Vetre, Pričaj Sa Mnom	Stefan Đorđević	Serbia
2026	Everytime		Sandra Wollner	Austria

=== Heart of Sarajevo Award for Best Director ===
Year	Director	Film	Nationality of director
2017	Emanuel Pârvu	Meda or The Not So Bright Side of Things	Romania
2018	Ioana Uricaru	Lemonade	Romania
2019	Emin Alper	A Tale of Three Sisters	Turkey
2020	Ru Hasanov	The Island Within	Azerbaijan
2021	Milica Tomović	Celts	Serbia
2022	Maryna Er Gorbach	Klondike	Ukraine
2023	Philip Sotnychenko	La Palisiada	Ukraine
2024	Yorgos Zois	Arcadia	Greece, Bulgaria, USA
2025	Ivana Mladenović	Sorella di Clausura	Romania, Serbia, Italy
2026	Ana Urushadze	Supporting Role	Georgia, Estonia, Turkiye

=== Heart of Sarajevo Award for Best Actress ===
Year	Actress	Film	Nationality of actress
2004	Marija Škaričić	A Wonderful Night in Split	Croatia
2005	Zrinka Cvitešić	What Is a Man Without a Moustache?	Croatia
2006	Marija Škaričić	Fraulein	Croatia
2007	Saadet Aksoy	Egg	Turkey
2008	Ayça Damgacı	Gitmek: My Marlon and Brando	Turkey
2009	Angeliki Papoulia and Mary Tsoni	Dogtooth	Greece
2010	Mirela Oprișor	Tuesday, After Christmas	Romania
2011	Ada Condeescu	Loverboy	Romania
2012	Marija Pikić	Children of Sarajevo	Bosnia and Herzegovina
2013	Lika Babluani and Mariam Bokeria	In Bloom	Georgia
2014	Mari Kitia	Brides	Georgia
2015	Cast of Mustang: Güneş Şensoy Doğa Doğuşlu Tuğba Sunguroğlu Elit İşcan İlayda Akdoğan	Mustang	Turkey
2016	Irena Ivanova	Godless	Bulgaria
2017	Ornela Kapetani	Daybreak	Albania
2018	Zsófia Szamosi	One Day	Hungary
2019	Irini Jambonas	Rounds	Bulgaria
2020	Marija Škaričić	Mare	Croatia
2021	Cast of The Hill Where Lionesses Roar: Flaka Latifi Urate Shabani Era Balaj	The Hill Where Lionesses Roar	Kosovo
2022	Vicky Krieps	Corsage	Luxembourg
2023	Ekaterine Chavleishvili	Blackbird Blackbird Blackberry	Georgia
2024	Anab Ahmed Ibrahim	The Village Next to Paradise	Austria, France, Somalia
2025	Sarah Al Saleh, Alina Juhart and Mina Milovanović	Fantasy	Slovenia, North Macedonia

=== Heart of Sarajevo Award for Best Actor ===
Year	Actress	Film	Nationality of actor
2004	Milan Točinovski	How I Killed a Saint	North Macedonia
2005	Peter Musevski	Labour Equals Freedom	Slovenia
2006	Rakan Rushaidat	All for Free	Croatia
2007	Saša Petrović	It's Hard to Be Nice	Bosnia and Herzegovina
2008	Leon Lučev and Slavko Štimac	Buick Riviera	Croatia and Serbia
2009	Relja Popović	Ordinary People	Serbia
2010	Marko Todorović	Tilva Roš	Serbia
2011	Thomas Schubert	Breathing	Austria
2012	Uliks Fehmiu	Redemption Street	Serbia
2013	Bogdan Diklić	A Stranger	Serbia
2014	Feyyaz Duman	Song of My Mother	Turkey
2015	Cast of Chevalier: Yiorgos Kendros Vangelis Mourikis Panos Koronis Efthymis Papadimitriou Giorgos Pyrpassopoulos Sakis Rouvas	Chevalier	Greece
2016	Gheorghe Visu	Dogs	Romania
2017	Șerban Pavlu	Meda or The Not So Bright Side of Things	Romania
2018	Leon Lučev	The Load	Croatia
2019	Levan Gelbakhiani	And Then We Danced	Georgia
2020	Vangelis Mourikis	Digger	Greece
2021	Georg Friedrich	Great Freedom	Austria
2022	Juraj Lerotić	Safe Place	Croatia
2023	Jovan Ginić	Lost Country	Serbia
2024	Doru Bem	Holy Week	Romania,Switzerland
2025	Andrija Kuzmanović	Yugo Florida (film)	Serbia,Montenegro

=== Heart of Sarajevo Award for Best Short Film ===
Year	Film	Original title	Director(s)	Nationality of director
2001	Copy Shop	Copy Shop	Virgil Widrich	Austria
2002	10 Minutes	10 minuta	Ahmed Imamović	Bosnia and Herzegovina
2003	The Wallet	Le portefeuille	Vincent Bierrewaerts	Belgium
2004	Me, Myself and the Universe	Ich und das Universum	Hajo Schomerus	Germany
2005	Before Dawn	Hajnal	Bálint Kenyeres	Hungary
2006	Good Luck Nedim	Sretan put Nedime	Marko Šantić	Slovenia
2007	Waves	Valuri	Adrian Sitaru	Romania
2008	Tolerantia	Tolerantia	Ivan Ramadan	Bosnia and Herzegovina
2009	Party	Tulum	Dalibor Matanić	Croatia
2010	Yellow Moon	Žuti mjesec	Zvonimir Jurić	Croatia
2011	Mezzanine	Mezanin	Dalibor Matanić	Croatia
2012	The Return	Kthimi	Blerta Zeqiri	Kosovo
2013	Shadow of a Cloud	O umbra de nor	Radu Jude	Romania
2014	The Chicken	Kokoška	Una Gunjak	Croatia
2015	A Matter of Will	Biserna obala	Dušan Kasalica	Montenegro
2016	Transition	Tranzicija	Milica Tomović	Serbia
2017	Into the Blue	U plavetnilo	Antoneta Alamat Kusijanović	Croatia
2018	Breath	Dah	Ermin Bravo	Bosnia and Herzegovina
2019	The Last Image of Father	Poslednja slika o ocu	Stefan Đorđević	Serbia
2020	Antiotpad	Antiotpad	Tin Žanić	Croatia
2021	Everything Ahead	Sve što dolazi	Mate Ugrina	Croatia
2022	Amok	Amok	Balázs Turai	Hungary
2023	27	27	Flóra Anna Buda	Hungary
2024	Absent	Noksan	Cem Demirer	Turkey
2025	Winter in March	Lumi Saadab Meid	Natalia Mirzoyan	Armenia, Estonia, France, Belgium
2026	Nobody Said Anything	Niko nista nije rekao	Tamara Todorović	Serbia, France, Slovenia, Croatia

=== Heart of Sarajevo Award for Best Student Film ===
Year	Film	Original title	Director(s)	Nationality of director
2017	Clean	Čistoća	Neven Samardžić	Bosnia and Herzegovina
2018	Last Call	Last Call	Hajni Kis	Hungary
2019	Sherbet	Šerbet	Nikola Stojanović	Serbia
2020	The Great Istanbul Depression	Büyük İstanbul Depresyonu	Zeynep Dilan Süren	Turkey
2021	Summer Planning	Planuri de vacanță	Alexandru Mironescu	Romania
2022	It's Not Cold For Mosquitoes	Nije zima za komarce	Josip Lukić and Klara Šovagović	Croatia
2023	Falling	Falling	Anna Gyimesi	Hungary
2024	The Smell of Fresh Paint	Miris sveze farbe	Nađa Petrović	Serbia
2025	Tarik		Adem Tutić	Serbia

=== Heart of Sarajevo Award for Best Documentary Film ===
Year	Film	Original title	Director(s)	Nationality of director
2006	Facing the Day	Što sa sobom preko dana	Ivona Juka	Croatia
2007	Interrogation	Informativni razgovori	Namik Kabil	Bosnia and Herzegovina
2008	Corridor No. 8	Коридор No. 8	Boris Despodov	Bulgaria
2009	The Caviar Connection	Kavijar konekšn	Dragan Nikolić	Serbia
2010	The Seamstresses	Shivackite	Biljana Garvanlieva	North Macedonia
2011	A Cell Phone Movie	Mobitel	Nedžad Begović	Bosnia and Herzegovina
2012	Turn Off the Lights	Lumea in patratele	Ivana Mladenović	Serbia
2013	Sickfuckpeople	Хворісукалюди	Juri Rechinsky	Ukraine
2014	Naked Island	Goli	Tiha K. Gudac	Croatia
2015	Toto and His Sisters	Toto şi surorile lui	Alexander Nanau	Romania
2016	A Mere Breath	Doar o răsuflare	Monica Lãzurean-Gorgan	Romania
2017	City of the Sun	Mzis qalaqi	Rati Oneli	Georgia
2018	Srbenka	Srbenka	Nebojša Slijepčević	Croatia
2019	When the Persimmons Grew	Xurmalar Yetişən Vaxt	Hilal Baydarov	Azerbaijan
2020	Merry Christmas, Yiwu	Merry Christmas, Yiwu	Mladen Kovačević	Serbia
2021	Landscapes of Resistance	Pejzaži otpora	Marta Popivoda	Serbia
2022	Museum of the Revolution	Muzej revolucije	Srđan Keča	Croatia
2023	Bottlemen	Flašaroši	Nemanja Vojinović	Serbia
2024	A Picture to Remember		Olga Chernykh	Ukraine
2025	Our Time Will Come	Unsere Zeit Wird Kommen	Ivette Löcker	Austria
2026	To Hold A Mountain	Córki góry	Biljana Tutorov, Petar Glomazić	Montenegro

=== Heart of Sarajevo Award for Best Short Documentary Film ===
Year	Film	Original title	Director(s)	Nationality of director
2022	We, ... Composition	We, ... Composition	Visar Jusufi	Kosovo
2023	Valerija	Valerija	Sara Jurinčić	Croatia
2024	Like A Sick Yellow	Si e verdhë e sëmurë	Norika Sefa	Kosovo
2025	The Men's Land	კაცების მიწა	Mariam Khatchvani	Georgia
2026	Holy Defiance	Tiha misa	Karla Jelić	Croatia

== Honorary Heart of Sarajevo Award ==
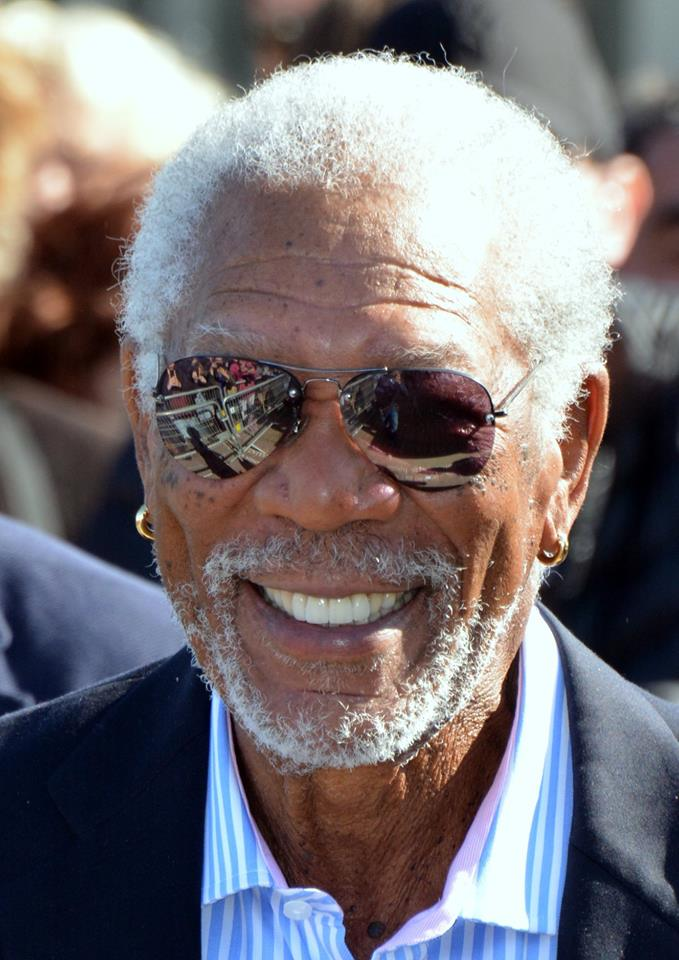
Morgan Freeman, the recipient of the 2010 Honorary Heart of Sarajevo

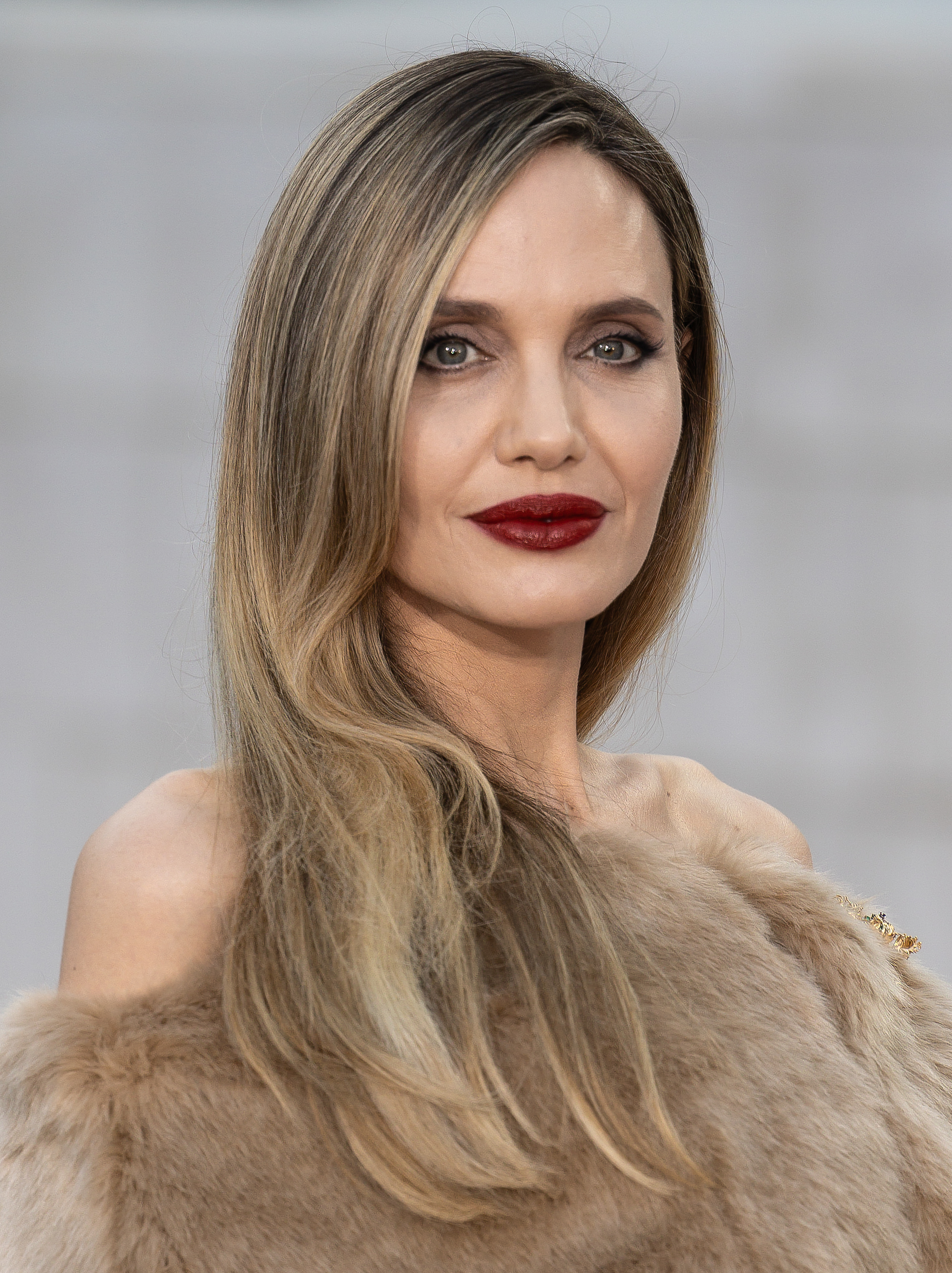
Angelina Jolie, the recipient of the 2011 Honorary Heart of Sarajevo

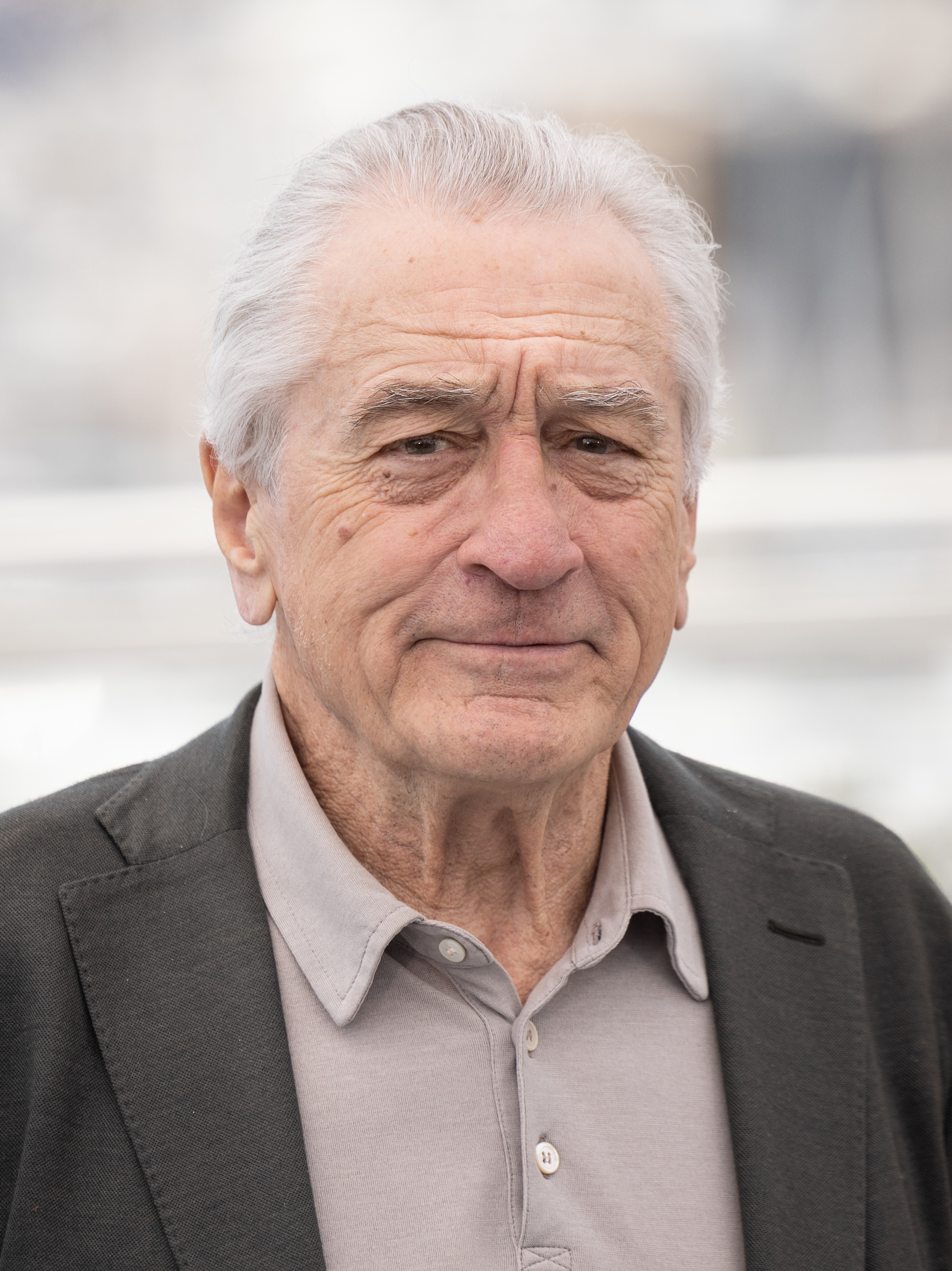
Robert De Niro, the recipient of the 2016 Honorary Heart of Sarajevo

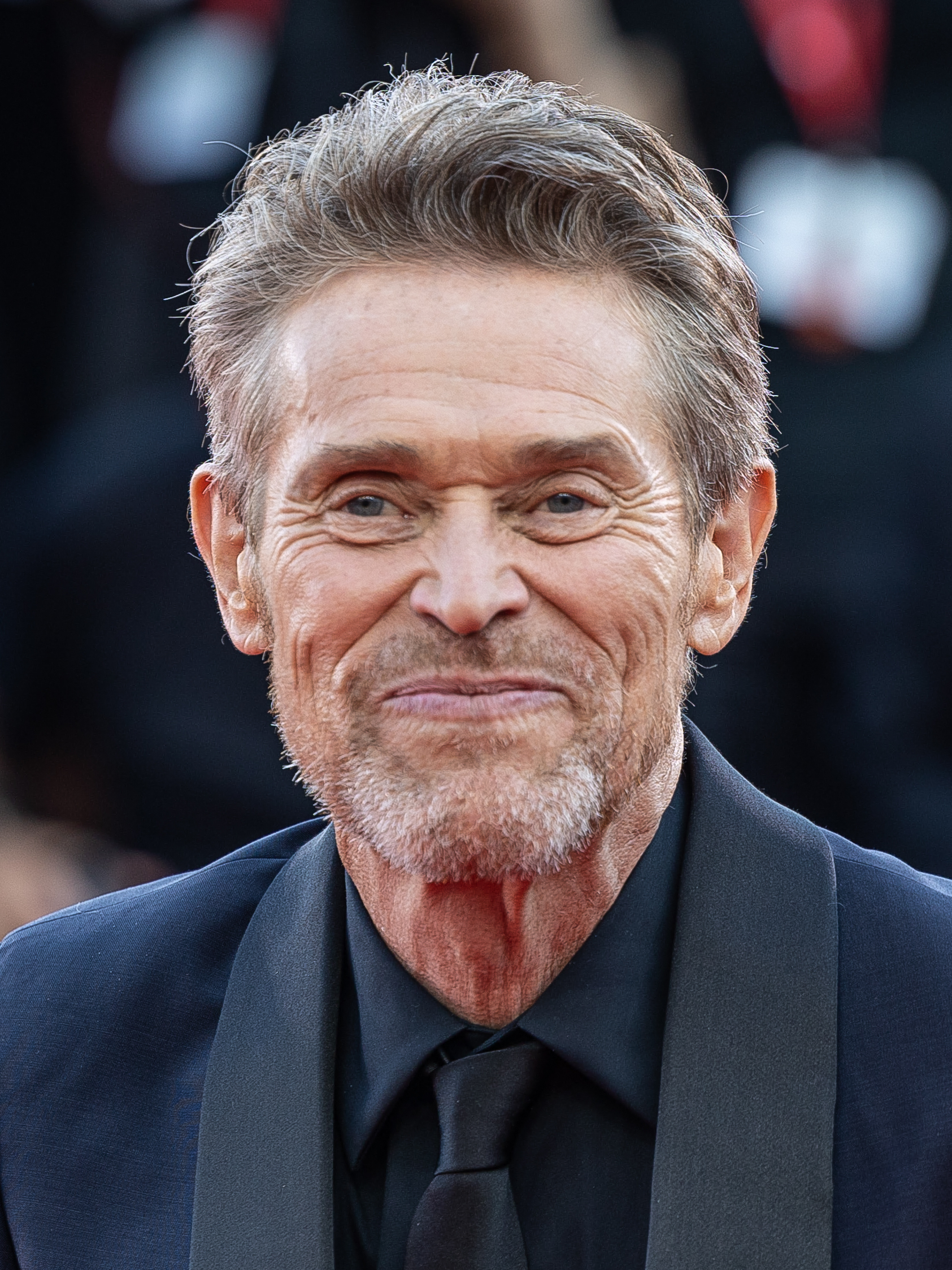
Willem Dafoe, the recipient of the 2025 Honorary Heart of Sarajevo

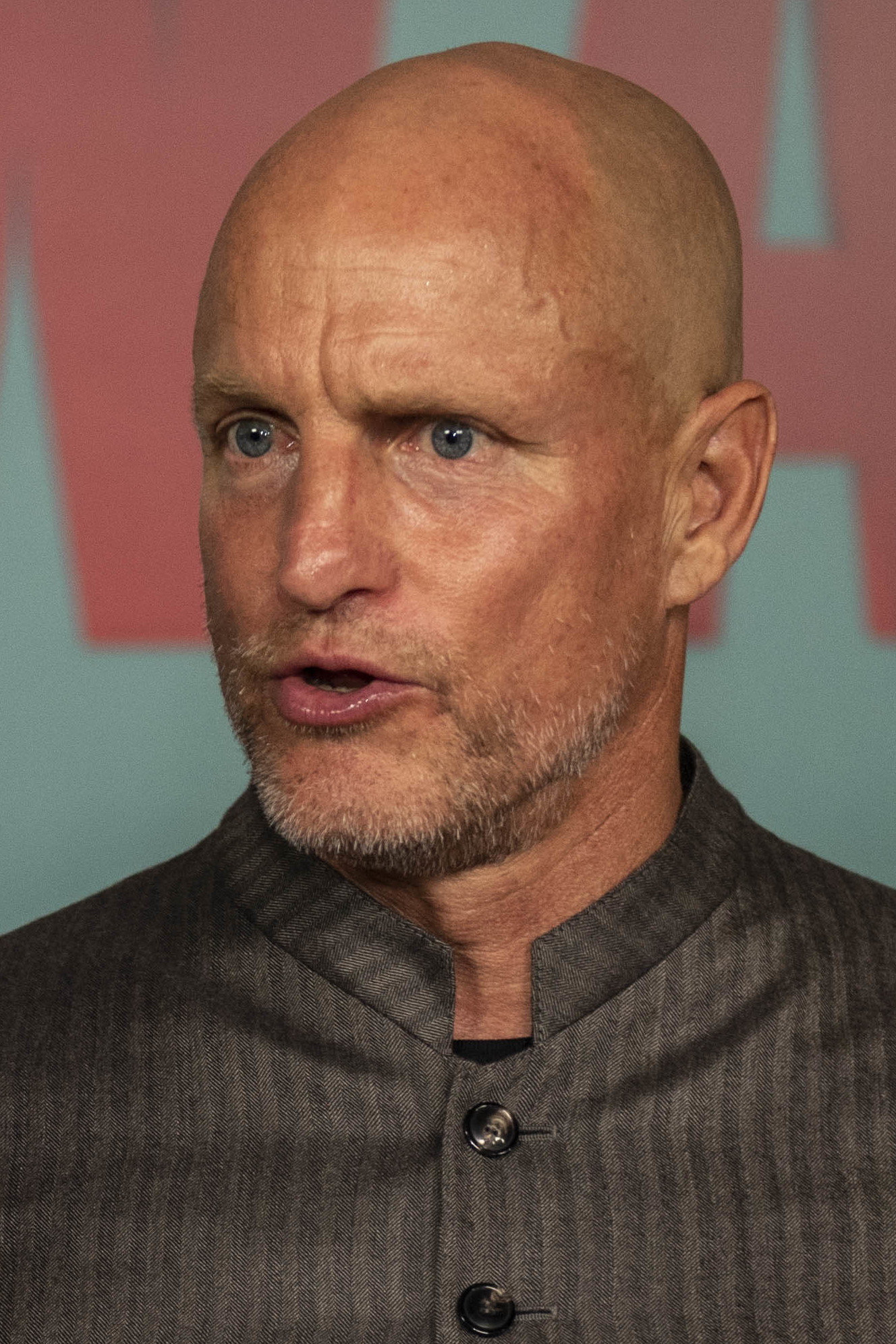
Woody Harrelson, the recipient of the 2026 Honorary Heart of Sarajevo Award

Since 2005, the Honorary Heart of Sarajevo has been also awarded to individuals who have contributed to the development of the festival, as well as regional film in general, term which comprise filmmaking in broad area of Former Yugoslavia, Balkans, and Southeast Europe. In 2016, the Honorary Heart of Sarajevo Award for lifetime achievement was introduced. Its first recipient was Robert De Niro.

Year	Winner	Note
2005	Marco Müller	Director of Rome Film Festival
2006	Gavrilo Grahovac	Former Minister of Culture and Sports in Bosnia and Herzegovina
2006	Mike Leigh	Film director
2007	Steve Buscemi	Actor and film director
2008	Cat Villiers	Film producer
2009	Manfred Schmidt	Executive director of Mitteldeutsche Medienförderung
2010	Morgan Freeman	Actor and producer
2010	Dieter Kosslick	Director of Berlin International Film Festival
2011	Angelina Jolie	Actress and film director
2011	Jafar Panahi	Film director
2011	Emil Tedeschi	President of Atlantic Grupa
2012	Branko Lustig	Film producer
2013	Roberto Olla	Executive director of Eurimages
2013	Béla Tarr	Film director
2014	Gael García Bernal	Actor
2014	Danis Tanović	Film director
2014	Agnès Troublé	Fashion designer
2015	Atom Egoyan	Film director
2015	Benicio del Toro	Actor
2016	Robert De Niro	Actor, film director and producer Lifetime Achievement Award
2016	Stephen Frears	Film director
2016	Wolfgang Amadeus Brülhart	Former Deputy Chief of Mission and Cultural Counselor at the Embassy of Switzerland in Bosnia and Herzegovina
2017	John Cleese	Actor and film producer
2017	Oliver Stone	Film director and producer
2018	Nuri Bilge Ceylan	Film director
2018	Nijaz Hastor	Owner and founder of the ASA Prevent Group and founder of the Hastor Foundation
2019	Alejandro González Iñárritu	Film director
2019	Isabelle Huppert	Actress
2019	Paweł Pawlikowski	Film director
2019	Tim Roth	Actor
2020	Michel Franco	Film director
2020	Mads Mikkelsen	Actor
2021	Wim Wenders	Film director
2022	Jesse Eisenberg	Actor
2022	Sergei Loznitsa	Film director
2022	Ruben Östlund	Film director
2022	Paul Schrader	Film director
2023	Mark Cousins	Film director
2023	Charlie Kaufman	Film director and writer
2023	Lynne Ramsay	Film director
2024	Alexander Payne	Film director
2024	Meg Ryan	Actress
2024	Elia Suleiman	Film director and writer
2024	John Turturro	Actor
2025	Paolo Sorrentino	Film director, screenwriter, and writer
2025	Stellan Skarsgård	Actor
2025	Ray Winstone	Actor
2025	Willem Dafoe	Actor
2026	Emily Watson	Actress
2026	Asghar Farhadi	Film director and screenwriter
2026	Diego Luna	Actor, director, and producer
2026	Emir Hadžihafizbegović	Actor
2026	Woody Harrelson	Actor

== See also ==
- Sarajevo Film Festival
- 31st Sarajevo Film Festival
- Heart of Sarajevo for Best Actress in a Drama Series
- Heart of Sarajevo for Best Actress in a Comedy Series
- Golden Bear award at the Berlin International Film Festival
- Silver Bear and other awards at the Berlin International Film Festival
- Palme d'Or, the highest prize awarded at the Cannes Film Festival
- Golden Lion, the highest prize awarded at the Venice Film Festival
