= 11th Asia Pacific Screen Awards =

- Date: 23 November 2017
- Site: Brisbane Conventions and Exhibition Centre, Brisbane; Australia

The 11th Asia Pacific Screen Awards were held on 23 November 2017 at the Brisbane Conventions and Exhibition Centre in Brisbane, Australia.

On 14 September 2017, three jury members were announced in Beijing by the Lord Mayor of Brisbane, Cr Graham Quirk. They are Chinese actress He Saifei, Filipino writer/director Adolfo Alix Jr and Kazakh writer, director and cinematographer Adilkhan Yerzhanov. Top Australian film editor, Jill Bilcock ASE ACE was later announced as the head of the international jury, joined by Yoshi Yatabe, the programming director of the Tokyo International Film Festival, completing the jury line-up. The international jury determined the winners of all the major APSA awards including Best Feature Film, Achievement in Directing, Achievement in Cinematography, Best Screenplay, Best Performance by an Actress and Actor. They also determined the winner of the Cultural Diversity Award, under the patronage of UNESCO.

Haifaa Al Mansour, was announced to be the chair of the Youth Animation and Documentary Jury, followed by Melanie Coombs and Steve Abbott.

== Winners and nominees ==
Nominees of Youth, Animation, and Documentary were announced with the jury on 4 October 2017. The full list of nominees were announced on 13 October 2017.

Best Feature Film	Best Animated Feature Film
(Australia) Sweet Country; (China) Angels Wear White (Jia Nian Hua); (Israel) Foxtrot; (Netherlands) A Gentle Creature (Krotkaya); (Iran) A Man of Integrity (Lerd)	(Canada) Window Horses: The Poetic Persian Epiphany of Rosie Ming; (China) Have a Nice Day (Da Shi Jie); (Philippines) Saving Sally; (Japan) A Silent Voice (Koe no Katachi); (Japan) your name. (kimi no na wa)
Best Youth Feature Film	Best Documentary Feature Film
(Indonesia) The Seen and Unseen (Sekala Niskala); (Turkey) Big Big World (Koca Dünya); (Australia) Jasper Jones; (Iran) The Skier; (China) The Summer is Gone (Ba Yue)	(Syria) Last Men in Aleppo; (New Zealand) Kim Dotcom: Caught in the Web; (Australia) The Opposition; (Lebanon) Taste of Cement; (China) A Yangtze Landscape (Changjiang)
Achievement in Directing	Best Screenplay
(Russia) Andrey Zvyagintsev – Loveless (Nelyubov); (Georgia (country)) Ana Urushadze – Scary Mother (Sashishi Deda); (Japan) Kore-eda Hirokazu – The Third Murder (Sandome no Satsujin); (Indonesia) Mouly Surya – Marlina the Murderer in Four Acts (Marlina si Pembunuh dalam Empat Babak); (India) Sanal Kumar Sasidharan – Sexy Durga	(India) Amit V Masurkar, Mayank Tewari – Newton; (Russia) Boris Khlebnikov, Natalia Meshchaninova – Arrhythmia (Aritmiya); (Kyrgyzstan) Dastan Zhapar Uulu, Bakyat Mukul – A Father's Will (Atanyn Kereezi); (Australia) David Tranter, Steven McGregor – Sweet Country
Achievement in Cinematography	Best Performance by an Actress
(Russia) Pyotr Dukhovskoy, Timofey Lobov – The Bottomless Bag (Meshok Bez Dna); (China) Lyu Songye – Ghost in the Mountains (Kong Shan Yi Ke); (Georgia (country)) Mindia Esadze – Scary Mother (Sashishi Deda); (India) Shehnad Jalal – Lady of the Lake (Loktak Lairembee); (Australia) Warwick Thornton, Dylan River – Sweet Country	(Georgia (country)) Nata Murvanidze – Scary Mother (Sashishi Deda); (Indonesia) Cut Mini – Emma' (Mother) (Athirah); (Turkey) Ecem Uzun – Clair Obscur (Tereddüt); (South Korea) Na Moon-hee – I Can Speak; (China) Zhou Xun – Our Time Will Come (Ming Yue Ji Shi You)
Best Performance by an Actor	Cultural Diversity Award Under the Patronage of UNESCO
(India) Rajkummar Rao – Newton; (Iran) Navid Mohammadzadeh – No Date, No Signature (Bedoune Tarikh, Bedoune Emza); (Philippines) Paolo Ballesteros – Die Beautiful; (Japan) Koji Yakusho – The Third Murder (Sandome no Satsujin); (Palestine) Mohammad Bakri, Saleh Bakri – Wajib (Duty)	(Georgia (country)) Dede; (Kyrgyzstan) Centaur; (Philippines) Die Beautiful; (Bhutan) Honeygiver Among the Dogs (Munmo Tashi Khyidron); (India) Lady of the Lake

== Multiple wins and nominations ==
The following films received multiple nominations

Nominations	Film
3	Scary Mother (Sashishi Deda)
3	Sweet Country
3	The Third Murder (Sandome no Satsujin)
2	Die Beautiful
2	Lady of the Lake
2	Newton
