= Otter (film) =

2025 film by Srđan Vuletić

- Teaser poster
- Montenegrin: Vidra
- Directed by: Srđan Vuletić
- Screenplay by: Stefan Boskovic
- Produced by: Ivan Đurović; Daniel Segre; Katarina Prpić; Ishak Jaliman; Fatmir Spahiju
- Starring: Masha Drashler
- Cinematography: Philip Toth
- Edited by: Polina Azeva; Vladimir Gojun
- Music by: Giorgio Giampà; Marta Lucchesini
- Production companies: Articulation film, Montenegro; Redibis film, Italy; Challenge 365, Croatia; Realstage, Bosnia and Herzegovina; Buka production
- Release date: 16 August 2025 (Sarajevo)
- Running time: 88 minutes
- Countries: Montenegro; Bosnia and Herzegovina; Italy; Croatia; Kosovo
- Language: Montenegrin

Otter (Montenegrin: Vidra) is a 2025 coming-of-age drama film directed by Srđan Vuletić. The film is about sixteen-year-old Hana, who has to overcome not one, but two traumas - the death of her father and the betrayal of her first love.

The film had its world premiere at the 31st Sarajevo Film Festival on 16 August 2025, in the Competition Programme - Feature Film, where it competed for Heart of Sarajevo award.

== Synopsis ==
Sixteen-year-old Hana, a reserved teenager, is thrilled when her crush, Balsha, invites her on a lake trip to film a solar eclipse. However, the excitement is short-lived — the next morning, her father, a former elite pilot, passes away. In his will, he requested to be buried in a spacesuit. While Hana’s mother wants to honour his wish, she struggles to withstand the pressure from relatives demanding a traditional burial. Overwhelmed and upset, Hana escapes to the lake. There, Balsha's behavior turns aggressive, shattering her expectations. Hana finds herself battling on two fronts: at home, to support her mother and defy her overbearing family, and outside, to demand respect and reject being reduced to a sexual object. She must take control or risk her "future be as dark as the darkness of the solar eclipse".

== Cast ==
- Masha Drashler as Hana
- Savin Perisic as Balsa
- Lara Velimirovic as Emili
- Mara Rakcevic as Mija
- Pavle Markovic as Luka
- Nada Vukcevic as Olga
- Marko Janketic as Uncle
- Jelena Laban
- Julia Milačić Petrović Njegoš
- Stefan Vukovic as Uncle
- Aleksandar Gavranic as Pegi
- Davor Dragojević
- Fatmir Spahiju as Lieutenant colonel
- Gresa Palaska
- Goran Nikcevic
- Maja Stojanovic
- Vuk Vucinic
- Davud Bahovic

== Production ==
In 2020, film director Srđan Vuletić received the €20,000 Eurimages Co-production Development Award during the CineLink Industry Days, the industry platform of the Sarajevo Film Festival, for his project Otter. The main roles were given to high school students. In 2021, the project was selected at 17th edition of Cinéfondation Atelier, spotlighted within the 2021 Cannes Film Festival.

The filming began in Podgorica on 22 April 2024.

== Release ==
Otter had its World Premiere at the 31st Sarajevo Film Festival, where it competed for Heart of Sarajevo award in the Competition Programme - Feature Film on 16 August 2025.

== Accolades ==
Award	Date of ceremony	Category	Recipient	Result	Ref.
Sarajevo Film Festival	22 August 2025	Heart of Sarajevo	Otter	Nominated	
