= Barsony =

Barsony (also spelled Bársony) is a Hungarian surname. Notable people with the surname include:

- Katalin Bársony (born 1982), Hungarian filmmaker
- Rosy Barsony (1909–1977), Hungarian actress
