= Helios Gómez =

Spanish painter (1905–1956)

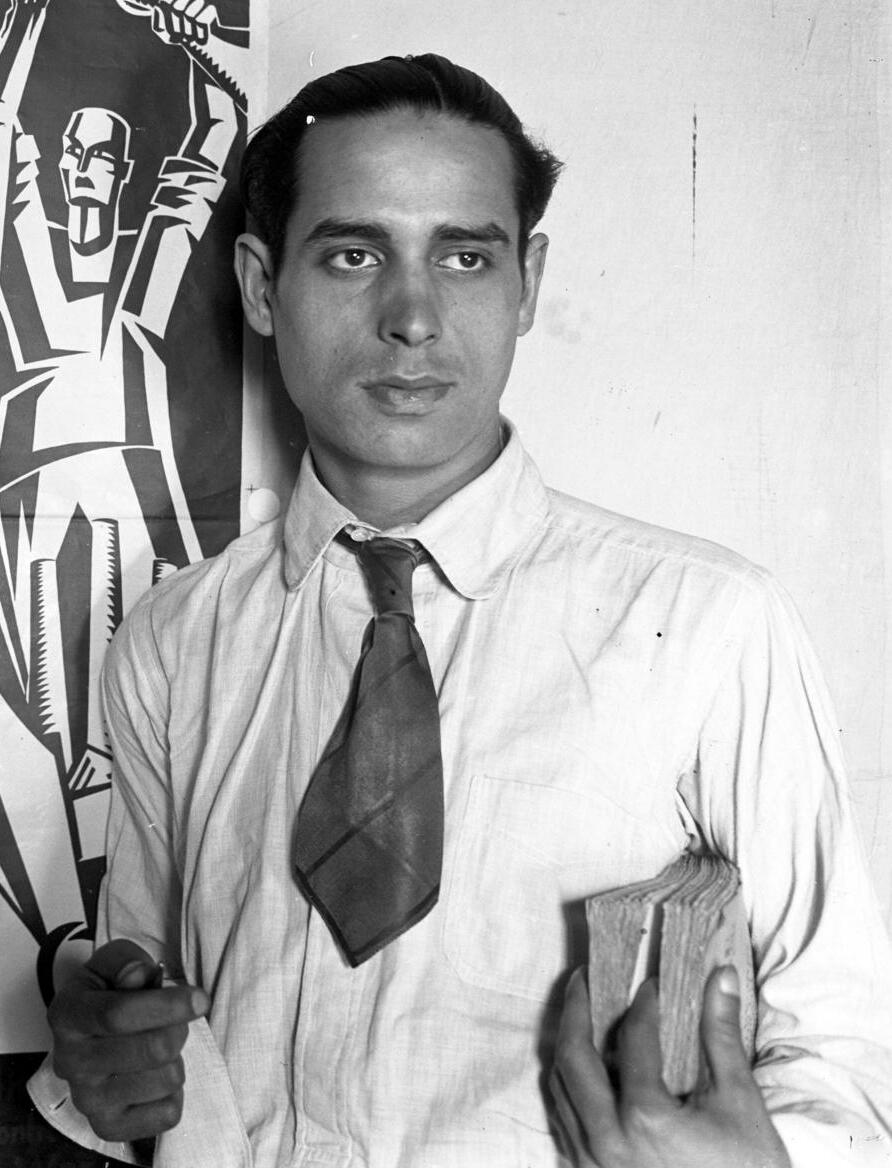
- Gómez with one his paintings
- Born: Helios Gómez Rodríguez; 27 May 1905; Seville
- Died: 19 September 1956 (aged 51); Barcelona
- Resting place: Montjuïc Cemetery
- Occupations: Painter, graphic designer, writer
- Political party: Communist Party of Spain
- Other political affiliations: Confederación Nacional del Trabajo
- Movement: Anarchism in Spain

Helios Gómez Rodríguez (1905–1956) was a Spanish painter, anarchist communist activist and writer. Born into a working class Calé family, he worked as a painter for the Spanish anarchist movement from an early age. His involvement in the movement forced him to flee Spain, and during his time in Europe he developed his artistic influences and was alerted to the rise of fascism.

Upon his return to Spain, he joined the Communist Party of Spain (PCE), seeing it as the force that was best organised to resist fascism. By the end of the Spanish Civil War, he returned to anarchism, but was forced to flee following the victory of the Nationalists. From the 1940s, when he was imprisoned by the Francoist dictatorship, he began focusing on his writing and presenting Romani themes through his creative work. His poetry was collected and published posthumously in 2006.

== Biography ==
Helios Gómez was born in 1905, in Triana, a predominantly Calé working class neighbourhood of Seville. From a young age, he worked as a painter and became involved in the Spanish anarchist movement. His occupation as an artist allowed him to be accepted by wider Spanish society, which considered Romani identity to be acceptable only through artistic expression, although anti-Romani sentiment would continue to be expressed towards him in press reports.

He published his first illustrations for the anarchist writer Felipe Alaiz and exhibited his early work at the radical art space Café Kursaal. Due to his activism, in 1927, he was forced to flee Spain. He then travelled throughout much of Western Europe, meeting members of avant-garde art movements and the labour movement. His time in Europe left an influence on his art style, which drew inspiration from cubism, expressionism and futurism. In 1930, he returned to Spain and settled in Barcelona, where he began working for the Confederación Nacional del Trabajo (CNT) as a printmaker for its newspapers, posters and books.

By this time, he had decided to renounce anarchism and join the Communist Party of Spain (PCE), as he felt the international communist movement was best organised to combat the threat of rising fascism. He participated in communist rallies, which saw him imprisoned in Barcelona's Model prison, and fought in the ranks of the Communist Party of Spain during the Spanish Civil War. Months after the outbreak of the war, he gave an interview with the left magazine Crónica. Introduced by the paper as a "famous Gypsy illustrator and revolutionary artist", he spoke about the anti-fascist cause as a means to overcome anti-Romani sentiment and praised the Soviet Union for its social integration of Romani people in Russia. By 1938, he had rejoined the anarchist movement and oversaw the printing layout of the newspaper El frente. When the Nationalists launched their Catalonia Offensive, he fled the country and was subsequently interned in French concentration camps.

After the war, when news began to emerge about the Romani Holocaust, he began to present himself more openly as a Romani person. He especially began to assert his Romani identity after his imprisonment by the Francoist dictatorship, when he was forced to paint the chapel in Barcelona's Model prison. Imprisoned from 1945 to 1946 and 1948 to 1954, he began focusing most of his efforts on his literary work. During this period, he wrote: two essays, including one on Romani art; two historical fiction novels, Gabrielillo Vargas, gitano rojo and Historia de los gitanos; an autobiographical epic poem titled Erika; and over 100 poems. Romani themes were present throughout his written works of this period, with Spanish artist Pedro G. Romero suggesting that he was motivated to assert his identity in a regime that suppressed the rights of Romani people.

In 1956, Helios Gómez died in Barcelona.

== Legacy ==
Helios Gómez is best known for his work as a graphic artist, which he employed in service of the Spanish labour movement. According to Spanish historians María Sierra and Juan Profundo, Helios Gómez had an indisputably important role in the visual depiction of Spanish workers and anti-fascist themes during the 1930s.

Relatively less attention has been paid to his literary work, which he took up from 1942 onwards. His poetry was published posthumously in 2006, as part of the collection Poemas de lucha y sueño. Less has also been written about his political activism. Gómez, along with Mariano R. Vázquez, was cited by Sierra and Profundo as a notable example of Romani participation in the Spanish anarchist movement. Profundo himself said that Gómez's lasting legacies were in his artistic creations and his commitment to social process, as well as how his Romani identity affected each of them.

Through the Associació Cultural Helios Gómez, his son Gabriel Gómez has recovered and promoted his works.

== Selected works ==
- Gómez, Helios (2005). Visca Octubre: el front de l'art (in Catalan). Granollers: Museu de Granollers. ISBN 9788487790515. OCLC 803052250.
- Gómez, Helios (2006). Poemas de lucha y sueño, 1942–1956 (in Spanish). Barcelona: Associació Cultural Helio. ISBN 9788461132904. OCLC 803038388.

== Bibliography ==
- Hertrampf, Marina (2018). "Helios Gómez". RomArchive. ISSN 2569-0957. OCLC 1188836734.
- Pro, Juan (2022). "Helios Gómez: To be Roma in the Revolution". In Rosenhaft, Eve; Sierra, María (eds.). European Roma: Lives beyond Stereotypes (in Spanish). Liverpool University Press. pp. 27–54. doi:10.2307/j.ctv2crj1sr.8. ISBN 978-1-80085-752-0. JSTOR j.ctv2crj1sr.8.
- Sierra, María; Pro, Juan (October 2022). "Gypsy Anarchism: Navigating Ethnic and Political Identities". European History Quarterly. 52 (4): 593–612. doi:10.1177/02656914221097011. hdl:10261/280207. ISSN 0265-6914.
