= Branka Petrić =

Serbian actress (born 1937)

- Бранка Петрић
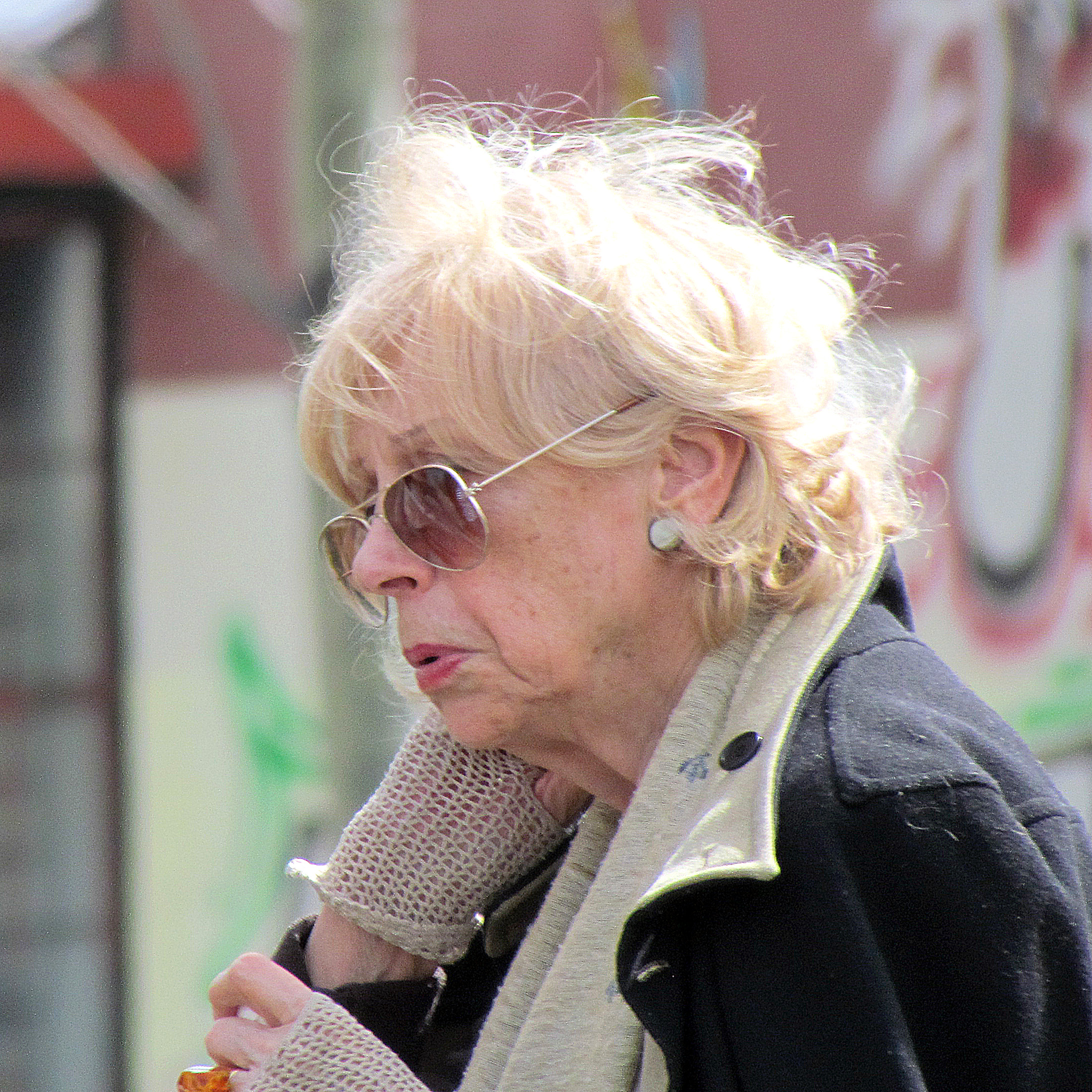
- Branka Petrić in 2018.
- Born: 17 April 1937 (age 89); Novi Vinodolski, Sava Banovina, Kingdom of Yugoslavia
- Occupation: Actress
- Years active: 1960–present
- Spouse: Bekim Fehmiu (died)
- Children: 2

Branka Petrić (Serbian Cyrillic: Бранка Петрић; born 17 April 1937) is a Serbian actress. She appeared in more than seventy films since 1960. She was married to Kosovo-Albanian actor Bekim Fehmiu and has two sons with him.

== Selected filmography ==
Year	Title	Role	Notes
2025	The Pavilion		It will open 31st Sarajevo Film Festival
2014	Love Island	Madame Henzl	
1984	Balkan Spy	Journalist	
1984	The Elusive Summer of '68	Leposava	
1971	The Role of My Family in the Revolution	Drugarica	
1962	Siberian Lady Macbeth	Aunt	
