= Srđan Vuletić =

Bosnian filmmaker (born 1971)

Srđan Vuletić (born 1971) is a Bosnian filmmaker.

== Personal life ==
Vuletić was born in Bijeljina, Bosnia and Herzegovina and attended school in Sarajevo, Bosnia and Herzegovina. At the age of eighteen he enrolled the Academy of Performing Arts in Sarajevo, dept. of directing, where he directed three plays: Pirandelo's The Naked Life, Ionesco's The Leader and Buchner's Woyczek, as well as a number of student films and exercises.

The 1992-1995 war in Bosnia interrupted his editing of the documentary The Orthodox Church. In the war he joined a hospital crew as a medical technician, an experience that later inspired his film I Burnt Legs. Also, during the war he produced documentary film about eight Sarajevo artists and the exhibition they held during this period and which was later to become the official Bosnian entry to the 45th Venice Biennale.

== Career ==
Vuletić directed the award-winning film "Hop, Skip, and Jump" (Troskok) in 1999 and his first feature-length movie, "Summer in the Golden Valley" ("Ljeto u Zlatnoj Dolini") in 2003.

== Filmography ==
- Ljeto u zlatnoj dolini (2003)
- It’s Hard to be Nice (2007)
- Otter (2025) It competed at the 31st Sarajevo Film Festival on 16 August.
