= The Track (2025 film) =

- Directed by: Ryan Sidhoo
- Screenplay by: Ryan Sidhoo; Graham Withers
- Produced by: Ryan Sidhoo
- Starring: Zlatan Jakic; Mirza Nikolajev; Senad Omanovic; Hamza Pleho
- Cinematography: Jesse McCracken
- Edited by: Graham Withers
- Music by: Edo Van Breemen; Johannes Winkler
- Production company: Spirit of 84 Films
- Release date: February 27, 2025 (True/False)
- Running time: 90 minutes
- Country: Canada
- Languages: English; Bosnian

The Track is a 2025 Canadian documentary film, directed by Ryan Sidhoo. The film profiles three luge competitors from Sarajevo who are training on their semi-destroyed luge track from the 1984 Winter Olympics with the goal of competing in a future Olympic Games.

== Distribution ==
The film premiered at the True/False Film Festival, followed by a screening at the San Francisco International Film Festival.

It had its Canadian premiere at the 2025 Hot Docs Canadian International Documentary Festival. Wild State, the production company co‑founded by Chris Hemsworth, boarded the film ahead of its Sarajevo premiere to support sales.

== Critical response ==
As of August 30, 2025, The Track has received six "Fresh" reviews on Rotten Tomatoes.

Robert Daniels of RogerEbert.com wrote that "You end up cheering because there is hard work by these subjects worth cheering for, and you cry because there’s plenty in the film to cry about."

For Point of View, Courtney Small wrote that "As Sidhoo and cinematographer Jesse McCracken capture every dangerous curve the men navigate with sweeping beauty, the charms of the structure begin to shine through. Incorporating archival clips of its glory days in the ’90s, and interviews with locals and the lugers themselves, the film offers a compelling argument for why the course is important to the community, even if the locals do not quite see it themselves."

Peter Howell of the Toronto Star wrote that Sidhoo "crafts an affecting coming-of-age story, balancing exhilarating luge footage with intimate glimpses of daily life."

== Awards ==
At the 31st Sarajevo Film Festival, it won the UniCredit Audience Award for Best Documentary Film.

At the 2025 Vancouver International Film Festival, the film won the Tides Award for Outstanding Canadian Feature Documentary and also received an honourable mention for the Arbutus Award for best British Columbia film.

The film was longlisted for the 2025 Jean-Marc Vallée DGC Discovery Award. It won the TIDES Award for Best Documentary film at the 2025 Vancouver International Film Festival.

The film received a Canadian Screen Award nomination for Best Feature Length Documentary at the 14th Canadian Screen Awards in 2026, and Edo Van Breemen was nominated for Best Original Music in a Documentary.
