= Mariam Khatchvani =

Georgian film director and screenwriter (born 1986)

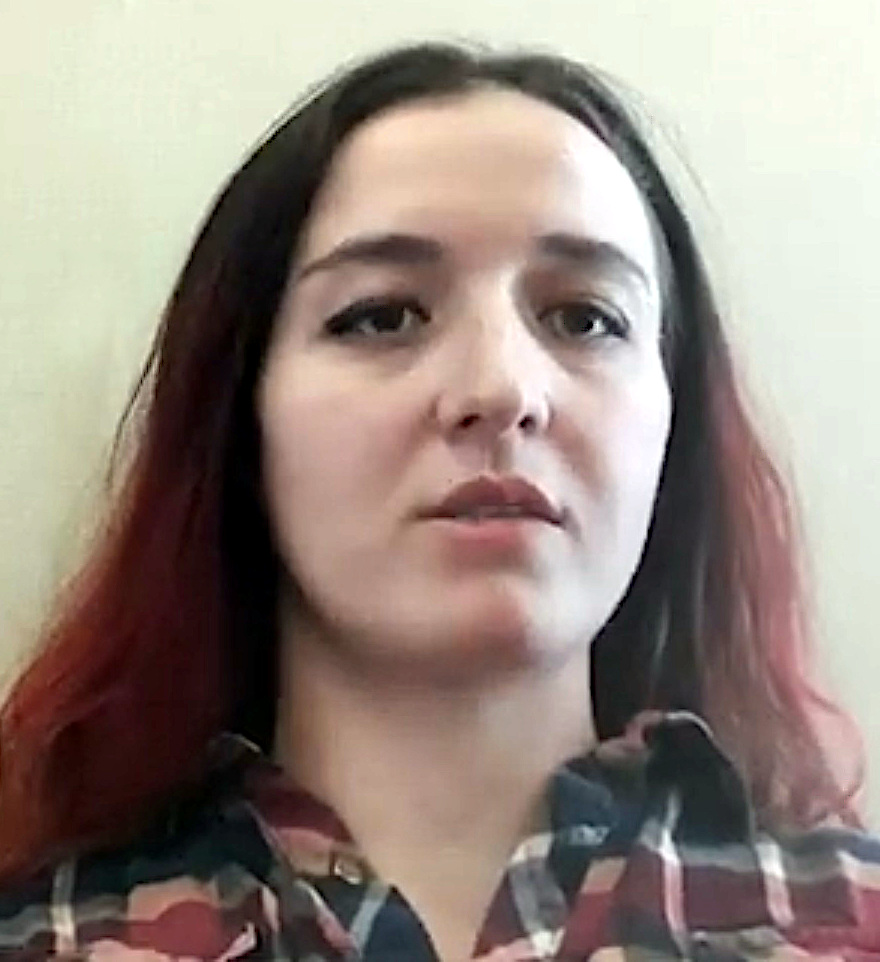
- Khatchvani 2020
- Born: 1 May 1986 (age 40); Ushguli, Georgia
- Occupations: Film director, screenwriter, cinematographer
- Years active: 2006 – present

Mariam Khatchvani (Georgian: მარიამ ხაჭვანი; born 1 May 1986) is a Georgian film director and screenwriter.

== Biography ==
Khatchvani graduated in 2008 from the Shota Rustaveli Theatre and Film University, Tbilisi. She has directed many short documentaries, including Verdzoba (2006), Beyond the Window (2007), Lichanishi and Kvirikoba (2009). Dinola (2013) is her latest fiction short.

The writer and screenwriter Miho Mosulishvili writes about Dinola :

Mariam Khatchvani's 'Dinola' is a myth-ritual cinematography. A strict, ruthless and poetical story from Caucasus mountains...

== Filmography ==
=== As writer and director ===
- The Men's Land (2025), Heart of Sarajevo for Best Short Documentary Film
- Dede (2017)
- Dinola (2013)
- Lichanishi (2009), documentary
- Kvirikoba (2009), documentary
- Beknu (2008)
- Panjris mighma / Beyond the Window (2007), documentary
- Verdzoba (2007), documentary
- Will (2005)

=== As producer ===
- Lichanishi (2009), documentary
- Kvirikoba (2009), documentary

== Festivals ==
- 31st Sarajevo Film Festival – Heart of Sarajevo for Best Short Documentary Film for The Men's Land in 2025
- European Film Academy • 2014 European Short Film Nominee
- 35th International Mediterranean Film Festival of Montpellier • 2013 Short Films competition.
- 36th Clermont-Ferrand International Short Film Festival • 2014 International competition
- 28th FIFF Festival International de Films de Fribourg • 2014 International Competition
- 38th Hong Kong International Film Festival • 2014 International competition
- 37th Norwegian Short Film Festival in Grimstad • 2014 International competition, Nominated for EFA
- 12th International Short Film Festival- In The Palace • 2014 Official selection
- 8th River Film Festival Porta Portello – Padua – Italy • 2014 Official Selections, Best Int. Short.
- 11th GOLDEN APRICOT International Film Festival • 2014 international Competition
- 2nd Festival " Courts - Moments " a Cadouin, Dordogne, FRANCE • 2014 Official Selections

== Honours and awards ==
- 2014 – International Shorts First Prize at the 8th River Film Festival (Padua, Italy), for the movie Dinola
- 2014 GNFC (The Georgian National Film Center) – 1st Place as a Début Project.
- 2014 SOFIA MEETINGS – award for Best Project.
- 2013 DAB Regional Co-Production Forum-Best Project Award
- 2012 Gala (literary prize) – Awarded as Best Screenplay for 'Dede'.
