= Fantasy (film) =

2025 Slovenian-Macedonian drama film

- International promotional poster
- Directed by: Kukla
- Written by: Kukla
- Produced by: Lija Pogačnik; Barbara Daljavec; Vlado Bulajić
- Starring: Sarah Al Saleh; Alina Juhart; Mina Milovanović; Mia Skrbinac
- Cinematography: Lazar Bogdanović
- Edited by: Lukas Miheljak
- Music by: Relja Ćupić
- Production companies: December; Krug Film
- Distributed by: Gustav film
- Release date: 8 August 2025 (Locarno)
- Running time: 98 minutes
- Countries: Slovenia; North Macedonia
- Languages: Slovenian; Albanian; Serbian; Bosnian; Macedonian

Fantasy is a 2025 drama film written and directed by Kukla (a.k.a. Katarina Rešek) in her feature debut. It stars Sarah Al Saleh, Alina Juhart, and Mina Milovanović as three friends, and explores the complexities of gender, desire, and self-discovery on meeting a transgender woman Fantasy. It is based on the same theme and characters as Kukla's 2020 short film Sisters.

The film had its world premiere in the Filmmakers of the Present section of the 78th Locarno Film Festival on 8 August 2025, where it competed for Golden Leopard – Filmmakers of the Present. It was also selected as the Slovenian entry for the Best International Feature Film at the 99th Academy Awards.

== Synopsis ==
Three tomboyish friends in their early twenties, Sina, Mihrije, and Jasna, navigate life in a Slovenian neighborhood where they clash with local boys who view them as disruptive. Their dynamic shifts with the arrival of Fantasy, a young transgender woman whose enigmatic presence gradually influences each of them. Although initially skeptical about romantic entanglements, Sina finds herself in an unexpected relationship. Jasna, seeking independence from her discontented mother, takes a job on a French cruise ship. Meanwhile, Mihrije flees to Macedonia with Fantasy to escape an arranged marriage, developing deeper feelings during their journey. Upon returning to Slovenia, the trio discovers how much they've changed, feeling emotionally distant from one another. Mihrije's final visit to Fantasy's apartment reveals she has vanished. Ultimately, each woman takes tentative steps into adulthood, forging paths that diverge from the futures they once imagined.

== Cast ==
- Sarah Al Saleh as Mihrije
- Alina Juhart as Fantasy
- Mina Milovanović as Sina
- Mia Skrbinac as Jasna

== Production ==
The project developed in 2022 at the 44th Cannes’ Résidence du Festival, held from 1 March to 15 July 2022, had production commitment from Ljubljana, Slovenia-based production company, December and co-production by North Macedonia-based Krug Film.

The film was shot for 29 days in Kruševo (North Macedonia), Trieste and Ljubljana, and wrapped on 9 December 2023.

== Release ==
Fantasy had its world premiere in the 'Filmmakers of the Present Competition' section of the 78th Locarno Film Festival on 8 August 2025, vying for the Golden Leopard – Filmmakers of the Present. It also competed for Heart of Sarajevo award in the Competition Programme - Feature Film at the 31st Sarajevo Film Festival on 17 August 2025.

On 2 October 2025, it was presented in Panorama section of 2025 Vancouver International Film Festival. It also competed in New Directors Competition at the São Paulo International Film Festival and had screening on 19 October 2025. It competed in Meet the Neighbors Competition section at the Thessaloniki International Film Festival in November 2025. In January 2026, it was presented in the Wild Roses section of the Trieste Film Festival, the section dedicated to the women directors of Central and Eastern Europe. It also ran in the Focus section at the Solothurn Film Festival on 27 January 2026. It was screened at the South East European Film Festival in LA on 4 May 2026. The film was also screened in the Regional Programme on 12 July 2026 at the Pula Film Festival.

== Reception ==
Marko Stojiljković reviewing the film for Cineuropa at Locarno Film Festival gave it positive review. Stojiljković praised Kukla's direction, screenwriting, Lazar Bogdanović's "subtle camerawork", Lukas Miheljak's "rhythmic editing", Relja Čupić's "moody electronic score" and Julij Zornik's "perfectly calibrated sound design". Stojiljković commended Kukla for getting convincing performances from non-professional actors and building on her 2020 short film Sisters, and successfully expanding her vision into a distinctive feature. Stojiljković found Fantasy, a visually and sonically immersive film.

== Accolades ==
Award	Date of ceremony	Category	Recipient	Result	Ref.
Locarno Film Festival	16 August 2025	Golden Leopard – Filmmakers of the Present	Fantasy	Nominated	
Sarajevo Film Festival	22 August 2025	Heart of Sarajevo	Fantasy	Nominated	
Sarajevo Film Festival	22 August 2025	Best Actress	Sarah Al Saleh, Alina Juhart and Mina Milovanović	Won	
Festival of Slovenian Film	26 October 2025	Best Original Music	Relja Ćupić	Won	
Festival of Slovenian Film	26 October 2025	Best Production Design	Maja Šavc	Won	
Festival of Slovenian Film	26 October 2025	Best Costume Design	Damir Raković	Won	
Festival of Slovenian Film	26 October 2025	Best Make-up	Tinka Prpar	Won	
Festival of Slovenian Film	26 October 2025	Special Achievement Award	Kukla	Won	
Trieste Film Festival	24 January 2026	Trieste Award for Best Feature Film	Fantasy	Won	
Adriatic Film and TV Awards	24 October 2026	Best Debut Film	Kukla	Nominated	

== See also ==
- List of submissions to the 99th Academy Awards for Best International Feature Film
- List of Slovenian submissions for the Academy Award for Best International Feature Film
