= The Men's Land =

2025 short documentary film by Mariam Khatchvani

- Promotional poster
- Georgian: კაცების მიწა
- Literally: Land of men
- Directed by: Mariam Khatchvani
- Written by: Mariam Khatchvani
- Produced by: Teimuraz Chkhvimiani; Vladimer Katcharava; Lado Margania; Archil Gelovani
- Starring: Anna Ushkhvani
- Cinematography: Gabriel Jobava; Nukri Khatchvani; David Kvatchantiradze
- Edited by: Elene Asatiani
- Production companies: Svaneti Film Studio; Murabba Films; 20 Steps Production; Independent Film Project
- Release dates: 9 April 2025 (Visions du Réel); 20 August 2025 (Sarajevo)
- Running time: 15 minutes
- Countries: Georgia; Hungary
- Languages: Georgian; Svan

The Men's Land (Georgian: კაცების მიწა, romanized: k'atsebis mits'a) is a 2025 short documentary film written and directed by Mariam Khatchvani. The film starring Anna Ushkhvani, documents the story of twenty-two-years old Ana, who is on the verge of fulfilling her dream: leaving the remote village of Ushguli for the big city, where she hopes to study singing.

The film had its world premiere in International Medium Length & Short Film Competition at the Visions du Réel on 9 April 2025, and its regional premiere at the 31st Sarajevo Film Festival on 20 August 2025, in the Competition programme - Documentary Film, where it won Heart of Sarajevo for Best Short Documentary Film award.

== Synopsis ==
In the remote mountain village of Ushguli located at the head of the Enguri gorge in Svaneti, Georgia, old traditions say that if a family has no son, their land must go to the closest male relative to keep the family name alive. The film tells the story of Anna who dreams of becoming a singer and stands up for her right to inherit her family's land. She challenges the long-standing customs that stop women from owning property. Her music becomes her way of protecting herself and fighting back against unfair treatment.

== Cast ==
- Anna Ushkhvani

== Release ==
The Men’s Land had its world premiere at the Visions du Réel on 9 April 2025. It also competed for Heart of Sarajevo award in the Competition programme - Documentary Film at the 31st Sarajevo Film Festival on 20 August 2025.

It had its Australian Premiere as part of the World Shorts at the Adelaide Film Festival on 22 October 2025.

It competed in the Red Sea: Shorts Competition strand at the Red Sea International Film Festival and had screening on 8 December 2025.

The film is also automatically nominated for the Oscars and the European Film Academy 2026.

== Accolades ==
| Award | Date of ceremony | Category | Recipient | Result | Ref. |
|---|---|---|---|---|---|
| Sarajevo Film Festival | 22 August 2025 | Heart of Sarajevo for Best Short Documentary Film | The Men’s Land | Won | |
| Red Sea International Film Festival | 13 December 2025 | The Yusr Awards Short Film | The Men’s Land | Nominated | |
