= Ryan Sidhoo =

Canadian documentary filmmaker

Ryan Sidhoo is a Canadian documentary filmmaker from Vancouver, British Columbia. He is most noted for directing The Track (2025), which was a Canadian Screen Award nominee for Best Feature Length Documentary at the 14th Canadian Screen Awards in 2026, and for producing Handle With Care: The Legend of the Notic Streetball Crew, a nominee in the same category at the 11th Canadian Screen Awards in 2023.

Born and raised in Vancouver, he played basketball with various Vancouver youth sports organizations as a teenager before going into filmmaking as a director and producer for Vice. In 2018 he directed the webby winning documentary series True North: Inside the Rise of Toronto Basketball, which was later re-edited into a 90-minute documentary film.

His 2025 documentary film The Track premiered at the True/False Film Festival. It was later screened at the 31st Sarajevo Film Festival, where Sidhoo won the UniCredit Audience Award for Best Documentary Film.
