= Wind, Talk to Me =

2025 Serbian film

- Promotional poster
- Serbian: Vetre, pričaj sa mnom
- Directed by: Stefan Đorđević
- Screenplay by: Stefan Đorđević
- Produced by: Dragana Jovović; Stefan Ivančić; Stefan Đorđević; Ognjen Glavonić; Vanja Jambrović; Jozko Rutar; Miha Černec
- Starring: Negrica Đorđević; Stefan Đorđević; Boško Đorđević; Đorđe Davidović
- Cinematography: Marko Brdar
- Edited by: Tomislav Stojanović; Dragan von Petrović
- Music by: Ivan Judaš
- Production companies: Non-Aligned Films; Katunga; SPOK Films; RESTART; Staragara Production
- Distributed by: Heretic Outreach
- Release dates: 4 February 2025 (IFFR); 17 August 2025 (31st Sarajevo Film Festival)
- Running time: 100 minutes
- Countries: Serbia; Slovenia; Croatia
- Language: Serbian

Wind, Talk to Me (Serbian: Ветре, причај са мном / Vetre, pričaj sa mnom) is a 2025 docudrama film written and directed by Stefan Đorđević in his directorial debut. A Serbian-Croatian-Slovenian co-production, the film inspired by the director's real-life experiences, featuring his own family members and set around the construction of a lake house, explores the intimate and enduring relationship between a mother and her son. The film is described as "a poetic and intimate cinematic experience," in reviews.

The film had its premiere in the Tiger Competition at the 54th International Film Festival Rotterdam on 4 February 2025. It had its regional premiere at the 31st Sarajevo Film Festival on 17 August 2025, in the Competition Programme - Feature Film, where it won the Heart of Sarajevo award for Best Feature Film.

== Synopsis ==
Stricken with guilt after accidentally hitting a dog with his car, Stefan chooses to take the injured animal with him to the lake in his hometown, a place where he hopes to finish the film dedicated to his recently departed mother.

Returning home for the first time since his mother’s death, he joins his family to celebrate his grandmother’s birthday. Rooted in the director’s own life and featuring his real family members, the film is dedicated to his late mother.

== Cast ==
- Negrica Djordjevic as Neca
- Stefan Djordjević as Stefan
- Boško Djordjevic
- Djordje Davidovic
- Budimir Jovanovic
- Ljiljana Jovanovic
- Marina Davidovic
- Ana Petrovic
- Vidak Davidovic
- Lija

== Production ==
In December 2023, the film was selected in the Work in Progress programme of Les Arcs Film Festival competition.

== Release ==
Wind, Talk to Me had its premiere in the Tiger Competition at the 54th International Film Festival Rotterdam on 4 February 2025.

In April 2025, it won in the Competition BFFB38 at the 38th Bolzano Film Festival for the Prize of the Province of South Tyrol for the best film. In July 2025, it competed in the CineVision Competition at the 42nd Munich International Film Festival for the CineVision Award for Best Film, and also competed in Ciné+ Competition at the Festival International de Cinéma de Marseille (FIDMarseille) for the First Film Award, and Special Mention. It was showcased in the Discoveries section at the 25th New Horizons Film Festival on 20 July 2025.

It had its Regional Premiere at the 31st Sarajevo Film Festival, where it won the Heart of Sarajevo award in the Competition Programme - Feature Film on 17 August 2025. On 11 October 2025, it was presented in Vanguard section of 2025 Vancouver International Film Festival, where it won the Vanguard Award. Canadian rights to the film were subsequently acquired by Ritual.

It competed in the New Directors Competition of the São Paulo International Film Festival and had screening on 16 October 2025, and 61st Chicago International Film Festival for Golden Hugo on 18 October 2025.

It competed in the Main Program at the Zagreb Film Festival for Golden Pram Award on 12 November 2025.

Athens-based sales agent Heretic has acquired the international sales rights of the film in December 2024.

== Reception ==
Guy Lodge reviewed the film at the International Film Festival Rotterdam for the Variety opined that the film is "A highly original, form-breaking work that pivots between diaristic recording and outright fiction." Wendy Ide in ScreenDaily felt that the film is a "Hybrid Serbian drama is an affecting creative meditation on grief." Marko Stojiljković at the International Film Festival Rotterdam for Cineuropa wrote, "Đorđević manages to make Wind, Talk to Me a captivating film, both about his mother and about himself coping with her passing." Debanjan Dhar reviewing in High on Films gave 3 stars out of 5 and wrote, that the film flows with the gentle pace of daily life, its shifting surfaces reflecting simple, meaningful moments and revealing the quiet generosity of the world beneath a vast, liberating sky.

== Accolades ==
Award	Date of ceremony	Category	Recipient	Result	Ref.
International Film Festival Rotterdam	9 February 2025	Tiger Award	Wind, Talk to Me	Nominated	
The 38th Bolzano Film Festival	13 April 2025	Prize of the Province of South Tyrol for the best film	Wind, Talk to Me	Won	
Sarajevo Film Festival	22 August 2025	Heart of Sarajevo	Wind, Talk to Me	Won	
Vancouver International Film Festival	8 October 2025	Vanguard Award	Wind, Talk to Me	Won	
Chicago International Film Festival	26 October 2025	Golden Hugo	Wind, Talk to Me	Nominated	
CinEast Film Festival	26 October 2025	Grand Prix	Wind, Talk to Me	Won	
Zagreb Film Festival	16 November 2025	Golden Pram	Wind, Talk to Me	Won	
Pula Film Festival	16 July 2026	Grand Golden Arena for Best Film Croatian Minority Coproduction	Wind, Talk to Me	Won	
Pula Film Festival	16 July 2026	Golden Arena – Best Cinematography Croatian Minority Coproduction	Marko Brdar	Won	
Adriatic Film and TV Awards	24 October 2026	Best film	Wind, Talk to Me	Nominated	
Adriatic Film and TV Awards	24 October 2026	Best Debut Film	Stefan Đorđević	Nominated	
Adriatic Film and TV Awards	24 October 2026	Best Director	Stefan Đorđević	Nominated	
Adriatic Film and TV Awards	24 October 2026	Best Lead Actor	Stefan Đorđević	Nominated	
Adriatic Film and TV Awards	24 October 2026	Best Screenplay	Stefan Đorđević	Nominated	
