= The Pavilion (film) =

2025 Bosnian dark comedy film

- Promotional poster
- Bosnian: Paviljon
- Directed by: Dino Mustafić
- Written by: Viktor Ivančić; Emir Imamovic Pirke
- Produced by: Mustafa Mustafić; Ishak Jalimam; Rusmir Efendić; Igor Vranjković; Dejan Krajčevski; Bojana Maljević; Dušan Kovačević
- Starring: Rade Šerbedžija; Ksenija Pajić; Mirjana Karanović
- Cinematography: Almir Đikoli; Mustafa Mustafić
- Edited by: Vladimir Gojun
- Music by: Bojan Zulfikarpašić
- Production companies: Panglas (Bosnia and Herzegovina); Cineplanet (Croatia); Krug Film (North Macedonia); Monte Royal Pictures (Serbia); Natenane Productions (Montenegro); Realstage (Bosnia and Herzegovina)
- Release date: 15 August 2025 (Sarajevo)
- Countries: Bosnia and Herzegovina; North Macedonia; Serbia
- Language: Bosnian
- Budget: €532,735

The Pavilion (Bosnian: Paviljon) is a 2025 Bosnian black comedy film directed by Dino Mustafić, and co-written by Croatia's Viktor Ivančić and Bosnia's Emir Imamović Pirke. The film starring Rade Šerbedžija, Ksenija Pajić and Mirjana Karanović tells the story of elderly residents of a nursing home who, frustrated by years of abuse, arm themselves and rise up against the staff, resulting in a tense confrontation with law enforcement.

The film premiered at the 31st Sarajevo Film Festival opening the festival on 15 August 2025.

== Cast ==
- Rade Šerbedžija
- Ksenija Pajić
- Mirjana Karanović
- Jasna Diklić
- Ermin Bravo
- Alban Ukaj
- Meto Jovanovski
- Zijah Sokolović
- Branka Petrić
- Vladimir Jurc Lali
- Kaća Dorić
- Muhamed Bahonjić
- Ivo Barišić
- Nikša Butijer
- Vedrana Božinović

== Production ==
The Pavilion directed by Dino Mustafić, was produced with the support of the Ministry of Culture and Sports of Sarajevo Canton, the Sarajevo Film Fund, the Croatian Audiovisual Centre, the North Macedonia Film Agency, the Film Center Serbia and the Film Centre of Montenegro, and in co-production with BH Telecom.

Principal photography began on 13 September 2023 at Hotel Internacional in Zenica in Bosnia and Herzegovina. The second phase of filming is scheduled for mid-March 2024, with all production taking place exclusively in Bosnia and Herzegovina.

== Release ==
The Pavilion had its world premiere at the 31st Sarajevo Film Festival opening the festival on 15 August 2025.

== Accolades ==
Award	Date of ceremony	Category	Recipient	Result	Ref.
Adriatic Film and TV Awards	24 October 2026	Best Lead Actress	Jasna Diklić	Nominated	

== See also ==
- List of Bosnia and Herzegovina films
- 2025 in Bosnia and Herzegovina
