= Sorella di Clausura =

2025 romantic drama film by Ivana Mladenović

- Festival poster
- Directed by: Ivana Mladenović
- Screenplay by: Ivana Mladenović; Adrian Schiop; Momir Milošević
- Produced by: Ada Solomon; Ivana Mladenović
- Starring: Katia Pascariu; Cendana Trifan; Miodrag Mladenović; Arnold Kelsch
- Cinematography: Marius Panduru
- Edited by: Vanja Kovačević
- Music by: Toni Cutrone; Andrei Dinescu
- Production companies: microFILM; Dunav 84
- Distributed by: B Rated International
- Release date: 13 August 2025 (Locarno)
- Running time: 107 minutes
- Countries: Romania; Serbia; Italy; Spain
- Languages: Romanian; Serbian; English

Sorella di Clausura is a 2025 romantic dark comedy film co–written, directed and produced by Ivana Mladenović. Starring Katia Pascariu and set in 2008, it follows Stela, a 36-year-old educated woman who struggles to maintain employment.

A Romanian-Serbian-Italian-Spanish co-production, the film had its world premiere in the main competition of the 78th Locarno Film Festival on 13 August 2025, where it was nominated for the Golden Leopard.

== Synopsis ==
Stela, a 36-year-old educated but unemployed woman, idolizes a famous Serbian musician known as “the God of poor and Roma people.” Hoping to escape rural poverty, she accepts help from Vera, a flamboyant starlet and rumored mistress of the musician. Vera brings her to Bucharest during Romania’s brief post-EU boom, where she runs a provocative business selling sexual products.

When the financial crisis hits and Vera’s business collapses, Stela becomes a servant in her remote border home. She finally meets her idol, only to be disillusioned by his vanity and fixation on wealth, realizing he only values the powerful and rich.

== Cast ==
- Katia Pascariu as Stella
- Cendana Trifan as Vera
- Miodrag Mladenović as Boban
- Arnold Kelsch as Charlie
- Cătălin Dordea as Mr. X
- Adrian Radu as Gabi

== Production ==
In 2022 the film was selected in the CineMart 2022, an IFFR Pro’s co-production market, which is run in conjunction with the International Film Festival Rotterdam. In February 2022, Ivana Mladenovic also participated in Eurimages Pop Up Residency programme, a special residency for women filmmakers developing their third or later feature film project. The film is produced by Romanian microFILM and Serbian Dunav 84 and co-produced by Italian Nightswim and Spanish Boogaloo Films.

In February 2025, the film was presented at IFFR Darkroom 2025 a Rotterdam-based market which offers a platform to present to the international industry recently or nearly completed films and immersive media projects seeking completion or gap funding, sales agents and festivals, held from 2 February to 5 February.

== Release ==
Sorella di Clausura had its World Premiere at the 78th Locarno Film Festival on 13 August 2025, and compete for Golden Leopard. A week later, it competed for Heart of Sarajevo award in the Competition Programme - Feature Film at the 31st Sarajevo Film Festival on 21 August 2025.

It will compete in the Main Program Together Again at the Zagreb Film Festival for Golden Pram Award on 12 November 2025.

Paris-Based B-Rated International acquired the international sales rights of the film before its World Premiere at Locarno in July 2025.

== Accolades ==
Award	Date of ceremony	Category	Recipient	Result	Ref.
Locarno Film Festival	16 August 2025	Golden Leopard	Sorella di Clausura	Nominated	
Sarajevo Film Festival	22 August 2025	Heart of Sarajevo	Sorella di Clausura	Nominated	
Sarajevo Film Festival	22 August 2025	Best Director	Ivana Mladenović	Won	
