= Tolerantia =

- A promotional film poster for Tolerantia
- Directed by: Ivan Ramadan
- Produced by: Ivan Ramadan
- Edited by: Ivan Ramadan
- Music by: Mostar Sevdah Reunion
- Release date: February 1, 2008
- Running time: 6 minutes
- Countries: Bosnia and Herzegovina

Tolerantia (2008) is a 6 minute short animated film. It is the first 3D animated short film produced in Bosnia and Herzegovina. It was directed and produced by Ivan Ramadan independently. The film is about intolerance between people.

The film was awarded with the "Heart of Sarajevo" award for the best short film at 14th Sarajevo Film Festival. It won the Prix UIP award which automatically nominated the film for 2008 European Film Academy Awards. Tolerantia has been screened as part of official selection of about 30 festivals around the world.

== Plot ==
The hero of the story awakes after a long sleep at the end of the last ice age.

== Production ==
A still from Tolerantia

Drafting of Tolerantia began in early 2007. Actual production lasted two and a half months, and finished in February 2008. The film was entirely created by Ivan Ramadan, including: producing, directing, script, editing, animation, sound and post production. Film transfer to 35mm was supported by the Federal Ministry of Culture and Sports of Bosnia and Herzegovina. The first screening of the film was at Meeting Point Cinema in Sarajevo on May 6th 2008.

== Awards ==
Ivan Ramadan holding the Heart of Sarajevo award for the best short film at 14th Sarajevo Film Festival (2008)

Year	Award	Catagory	Note
2008	36th Huesca International Film Festival, Spain	Special Mention	
	14th Sarajevo Film Festival	Prix UIP	
		Heart of Sarajevo for the Best Short Film	Nominated
	10th 24fps International Film Festival, Texas, USA	Special Jury Citation – Extraordinary Achievement	
2009	4th Neum Animation Film Festival, Bosnia and Herzegovina	The Best 3D Animated Film	
	7th ISFF In the Palace, Bulgaria	Special Jury Mention for Animation Film	
