= Norika Sefa =

Kosovan film director

- Born: Gjakova, Kosovo
- Education: FAMU Prague
- Occupation: Film director

Norika Sefa is a Kosovan film director, writer and editor, living in Prague, Czech Republic. Her feature film debut, Looking for Venera (2021), won a special jury award at the 50th International Film Festival Rotterdam.

== Life and work ==
She holds a master's degree from the FAMU Prague. In her films, she often merges fiction and documentary. Norika has been invited to join the European Film Academy.

Desde Arriba (2020) is a hybrid documentary made under the guidance of Werner Herzog in the Peruvian jungle.

In 2025, Sefa was appointed as the jury member at the 31st Sarajevo Film Festival for Sarajevo Film Festival Special Award for Promoting Gender Equality.

== Looking for Venera ==
Looking for Venera (Albanian: Në kërkim të Venerës) (2021) is Sefa's debut feature film. The film is a coming-of-age drama shot in Kosovo with an ensemble composed of mostly non-actors. She wanted to show a picture of Kosovo far from exotic stereotypes.

The film is a Kosovo Cinematography Center and Macedonia co-production. The film was shot in a small town in Kosovo, at the border with Macedonia. The film premiered at 50th International Film Festival Rotterdam, winning a special jury award in the Tiger competition. Norika is currently developing her next feature film set in Kosovo.

== Filmography ==
- Desde Arriba (2020) – short doc
- Kiss Me, Now (2020) – short doc
- Në kërkim të Venerës/Looking for Venera (2021) – feature film
- Like a Sick Yellow / Si e verdhë e sëmurë – short doc, winner of Heart of Sarajevo Award for Best Short Documentary Film
