= Love Island (2014 film) =

- Directed by: Jasmila Žbanić
- Written by: Jasmila Žbanić
- Starring: Ariane Labed; Ermin Bravo; Ada Condeescu
- Release date: 8 August 2014 (LIFF)
- Running time: 86 minutes
- Countries: Bosnia and Herzegovina; Croatia; Germany; Switzerland
- Languages: English; Croatian; Bosnian; French talian

Love Island is a 2014 film directed by Jasmila Žbanić.

== Cast ==
- Ariane Labed as Liliane
- Ermin Bravo as Grebo
- Ada Condeescu as Flora
- Franco Nero as Marquis Polesini
- Leon Lučev as Stipica
- Branka Petrić as Madame Henzl

== Reception ==
Stephen Dalton gave a negative review in The Hollywood Reporter: "Love Island is not a subtle movie. The dialogue, written and spoken by people for whom English is plainly a second or third language, is full of corny lines and clunky twists. The camera work also feels oddly jittery, with lots of sudden crash zooms that would make more sense in a mockumentary than in this kind of sweet comic trifle. The characters are cartoons, their romantic crisis deeply implausible and their final reconciliation risibly silly."

In a 2020 Jutarnji list review of Quo Vadis, Aida?, Nenad Polimac described Love Island as: "Her first film in which the war was not mentioned at all, Love Island, made in Rovinj, was a complete misstep. It turned out that the director didn't have much talent for comedy, least of all romantic comedy, so she decided to return to war-torn Bosnia, and in a big way."
