= Katalin Bársony =

Romani film-maker

- Bársony Katalin
- Born: 1982 (age 43–44); Budapest, Hungary
- Occupations: Film director; sociologist; Romani rights activist
- Years active: 2000s–present
- Known for: Mundi Romani – The World through Roma Eyes; How Far the Stars
- Title: Executive director, Romedia Foundation
- Parent: Ágnes Daróczi (mother)
- Awards: UNESCO Award for Cultural Understanding (2010)

Academic background
- Education: Corvinus University of Budapest (PhD in communication and behavioural sciences)

Academic work
- Discipline: Sociology; Communication studies
- Sub-discipline: Romani studies; media and communication
- Institutions: Romedia Foundation
- Notable works: Mundi Romani – The World through Roma Eyes; How Far the Stars

Katalin Bársony (born 1982) is a Hungarian Romani film-maker and sociologist. She produced the series Mundi Romani – The World through Roma Eyes and directed the documentary How Far the Stars.

== Life ==
Katalin Bársony was born in 1982 in Budapest to a Romani mother (Ágnes Daróczi) and a Jewish father. She studied for a PhD at the Corvinus University. She then worked in television and created Mundi Romani – The World through Roma Eyes, the first documentary series about Romani communities to be shown on Hungarian television.

In 2009, Bársony was one of four experts who briefed the Commission on Security and Cooperation in Europe on Romani issues. She is the executive director of the Romedia Foundation, which produces films about Romani communities. Bársony was asked to curate a selection of 35 films about Romani culture for the RomArchive. She took her 2019 documentary How Far the Stars to festivals including Sarajevo Film Festival and Eastern Neighbours.

Her documentary Suno Dikhlem, a Belgian–Hungarian co-production, was selected for the main competition of the 31st Sarajevo Film Festival. the film follows a Kosovar Roma boy who faces deportation from Germany and explores questions of identity, home and future.

== Selected works ==
- 2025 I Saw a 'Suno' Suno Dikhlem competed at the 31st Sarajevo Film Festival.
- 2019 How Far the Stars (director of documentary)
- 2007–2011 Mundi Romani – The World through Roma Eyes (creator of series)
