= Milica Tomović =

Filmmaker

Milica Tomović (born 1986) is a Serbian film director.

== Life and career ==
She was born in 1986. Tomović graduated from the Academy of Dramatic Arts at the University of Arts in Belgrade with the omnibus film October in 2011, produced with her classmates. Milica participated in the Berlinale Talents in 2012 and the Nipkow Program in 2023.

Her short film Transition premiered at the 69th edition of the Locarno Film Festival. The film went on to win the Best Short Film at the Sarajevo Film Festival, the Golden Plaque of Belgrade at the Belgrade Documentary and Short Film Festival, the Best Short Film at the Mezipatra Queer Film Festival, as well as several other awards.

Her feature film debut Celts (Kelti) won the First Look Award at the Locarno Film Festival initiative aiming to showcase films in post-production. Premiering at the Panorama section of the Berlin International Film Festival, and receiving positive reviews, it was a contender for the Teddy Awards and went on to win the Scythian Dear Award at the Molodist International Film Festival Kyiv, as well as the Fipresic Award. The film also won the Special Jury Prize at the Taipei Film Festival, as well as the Audience Award and the Taiwan Film Critics Society Award. It also won the Heart of Sarajevo at the Sarajevo Film Festival, and the Special Festival Award at the Merlinka Film Festival plus the Directors Week Award at the Brussels International Film Festival.

Her sophomore feature Big Women from Tomović won the Eurimages Co-Production Development Award at the Sarajevo Film Festival's Cinelink industry Awards in 2024. The film is a road-trip dramedy that follows two women who embark on an unexpected trip to the coast of Montenegro.

== Filmography ==
- October (2011) - segment Graduation (Diplomiranje)
- Transition (2016, short film)
- Tomorrow is a New Day (2018, TV series)
- Celts (Kelti) (2021)
- Blok 27 (2022, TV series)
- Big Women (2024)
