= 31st Sarajevo Film Festival =

2025 film festival in Sarajevo, Bosnia and Herzegovina

- Official poster
- Opening film: The Pavilion, by Dino Mustafić
- Location: Sarajevo, Bosnia and Herzegovina
- Founded: 1995
- Awards: Heart of Sarajevo: Wind, Talk to Me by Stefan Đorđević
- Hosted by: Directorate of Sarajevo Film Festival
- No. of films: 227
- Festival date: Opening: 15 August 2025; Closing: 22 August 2025
- Website: SFF

Sarajevo Film Festival
- 32nd 30th

The 31st Sarajevo Film Festival took place between 15 and 22 August 2025 in Sarajevo, Bosnia and Herzegovina. Black comedy film The Pavilion, by Bosnian filmmaker Dino Mustafić, opened the festival. A total of 227 films from 65 countries were shown in 22 festival programmes, out of which 50 films competed for the Heart of Sarajevo awards across four competition categories: feature, documentary, short, and student films. The selection included 15 world premieres, six international, 28 regional, and two national premieres.

Ukrainian filmmaker Sergei Loznitsa served as jury president of Competition Program - Feature Film. Paolo Sorrentino, film director, screenwriter, and writer was the recipient of the Honorary Heart of Sarajevo Award for "outstanding contribution to the art of cinema". A retrospective of his films was featured as part of the festival’s "Tribute To" program. Actors Stellan Skarsgård, Ray Winstone and Willem Dafoe, were also awarded the Honorary Heart Award.

The festival closed on 22 August 2025 with the awards ceremony. Wind, Talk to Me by the Serbian director Stefan Đorđević won the Heart of Sarajevo award for best feature film.

== Highlights ==
- "Watch. Think. Act. - Youth for Human Rights"

As part of this edition, in collaboration with UNESCO and the Dialogue for the Future 3 project, the festival will present the program "Watch. Think. Act. – Youth for Human Rights". Young people aged 18 to 25, through films, discussions, collaborative activities, and visits to key locations, will gain insight into the core principles of human rights, learn to identify and uphold them in daily life, and connect with like-minded peers committed to driving social change.

- Special Youth Perspectives Award:

From this edition newly introduced 'Special Youth Perspectives Award' with the participation of the Council of Europe will be presented. As per the Council:

"The award aims to highlight the perspectives and approaches of young people to meeting current challenges".

And it will be presented to a

"film portraying young people’s role in shaping societies and democracies, as well as their experiences and aspirations, and issues that matter the most to them."

- Poster

The poster designed by Jons Vukorep has the word 'SARAJEVO' written in the shape of a heart, representing a symbol of both the city and the award itself.

- Spotlight on Sweden

This year’s Festival includes a "Spotlight on Sweden" initiative aimed at increasing collaboration between the Balkans and Sweden through co-production efforts and industry exchange.

- Spotlight on Poland

The festival presented Spotlight on Poland, in partnership with the Polish Film Institute in this year's festival. It highlighted the strength of Poland’s co-production potential and the innovative frameworks, tools, and production companies.

- Sarajevo Film Festival Partner Presents

In Sarajevo Film Festival Partner Presents programme the films from Doha Film Institute and the films aligning with Qatar National Vision 2030 were presented.

- "Tribute To" program

A retrospective of Ilya Khrzhanovsky, a Russian-born film director, screenwriter, film producer and member of the European Film Academy, was presented in "Tribute To" program.

- Masterclasses

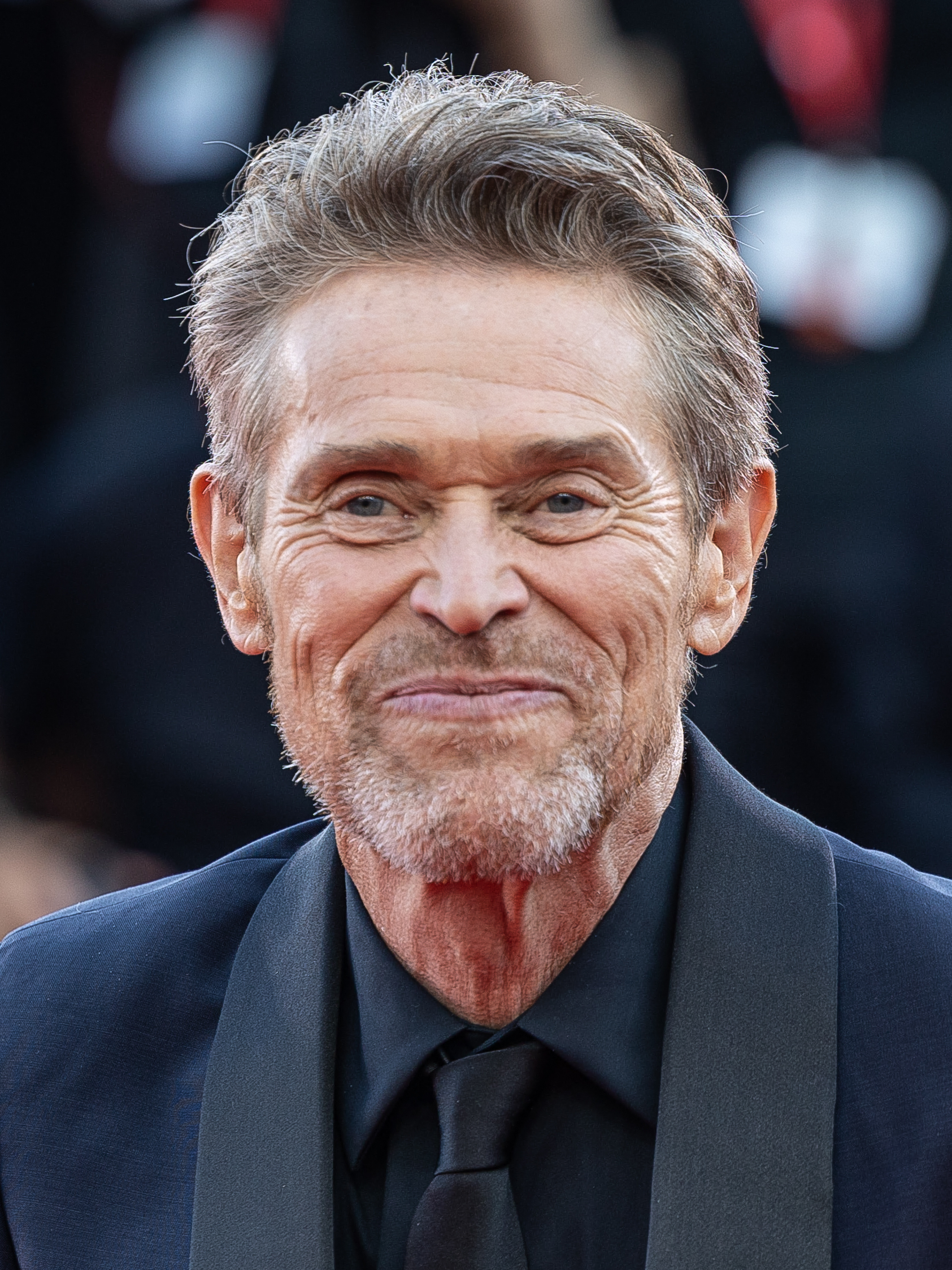
Willem Dafoe, recipient of the Honorary Heart of Sarajevo

  - Paolo Sorrentino – Italian director and screenwriter on 17 August
  - Michel Franco – Mexican filmmaker on 18 August
  - Ray Winstone – English television, stage, and film actor on 19 August
  - Ilya Khrzhanovsky – Russian-born film director, screenwriter, film producer and member of the European Film Academy on 20 August
  - Willem Dafoe – American actor on 21 August
- Opening ceremony

The opening ceremony was held with the red carpet laid down in the front of the Sarajevo National Theatre, hosted by Max Alija Ludwig, Charlotte Izmira Cavčić and Bosanian actress Lidija Kordić.

== Jury ==
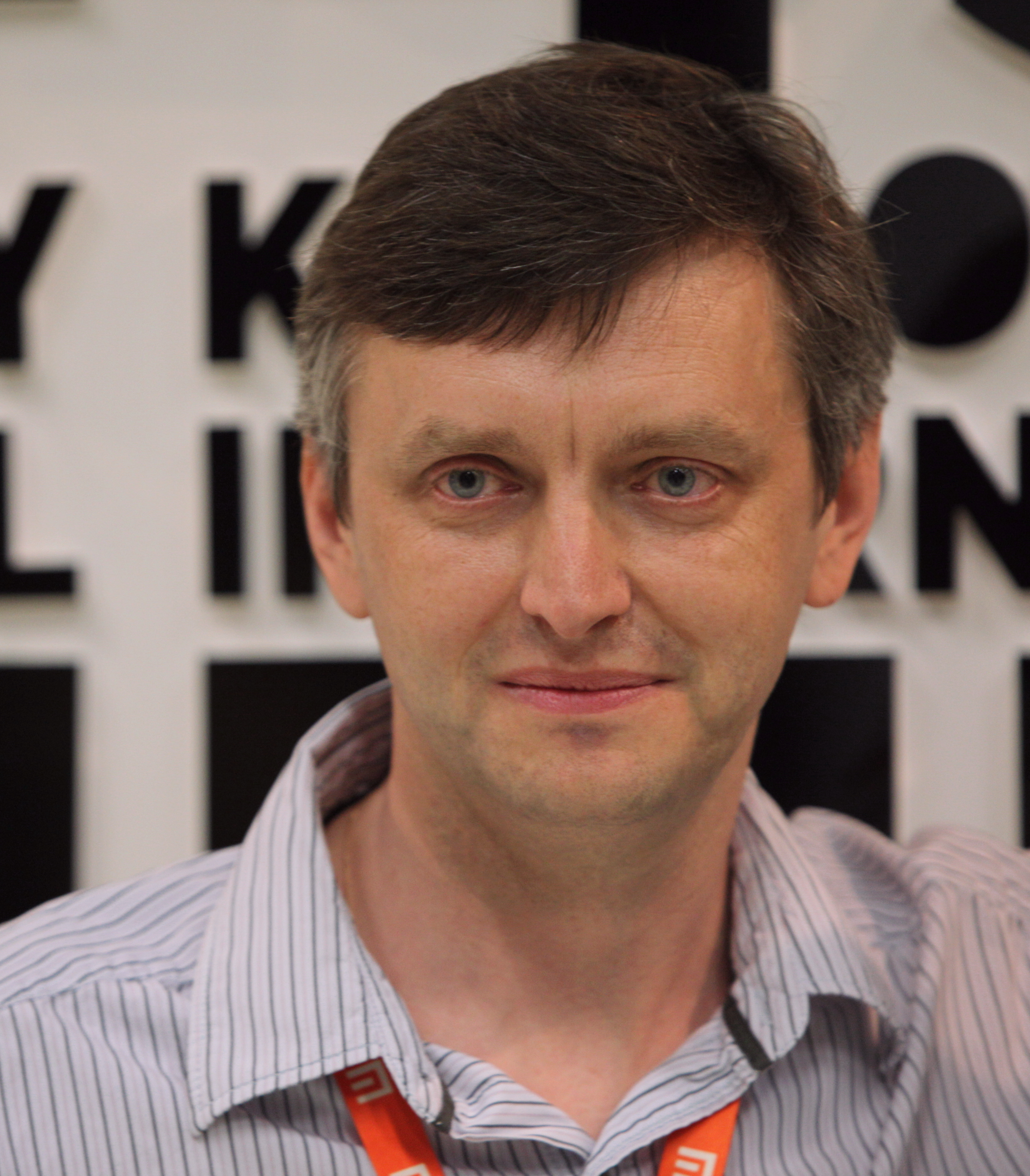
Sergei Loznitsa, Jury President

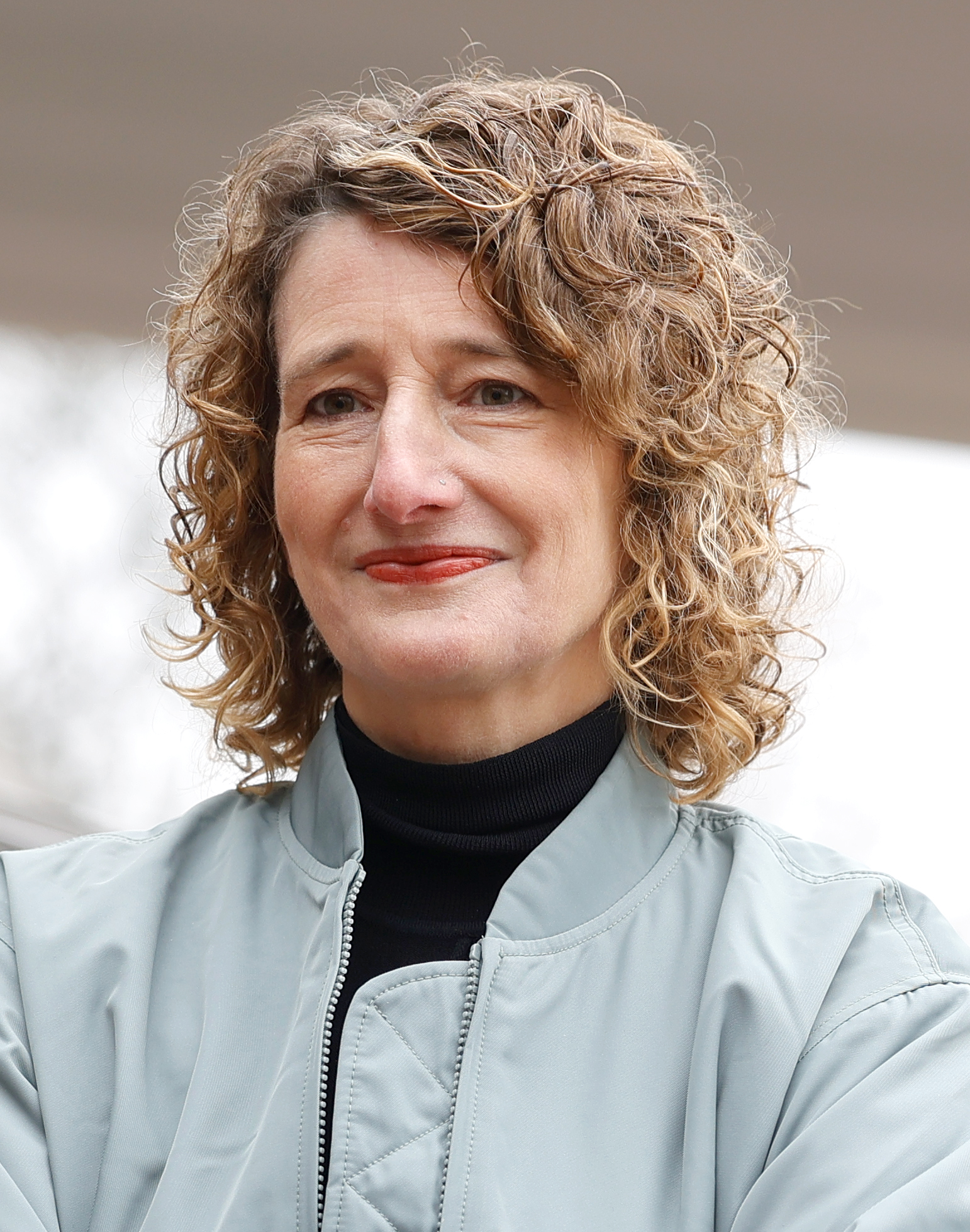
Tricia Tuttle, Jury member

=== Competition Programme – Feature Film ===
The jury of the Competition Programme – Feature Film includes 4 members and Ukraine’s Sergei Loznitsa as jury president.

- Sergei Loznitsa, a Ukrainian director of Belarusian origin known for his documentary as well as dramatic films. (Jury President)
- Dragan Mićanović, a Serbian actor from Loznica
- Emanuel Pârvu, a Romanian actor and filmmaker
- Ena Sendijarević, a Bosnian-Dutch filmmaker and screenwriter known for her distinctive blend
- Tricia Tuttle, an American festival programmer, film journalist, and curator.

=== Sarajevo Film Festival's Special Award for Gender Equality ===
- Anna Croneman, Swedish film and television producer
- Ivan Marinović, multi-award-winning director, screenwriter and producer from Montenegro
- Norika Sefa, Kosovan film director, writer and editor,

=== CineLink Female Voices award ===
- Aida Begić, Bosnian film director and screenwriter.
- Nataša Bučar, Director of the Slovenian Film Centre
- Dita Rietuma, Doctor of Arts, a film historian, critic and director of the National Film Centre of Latvia

== Official selection ==
Fifty films will compete for the Heart of Sarajevo awards at the festival in the four competition sections.

=== Pre-opening and opening films ===
A special pre-festival screening of a digital version of the 1955 Yugoslavian film Hanka directed by Slavko Vorkapić was held on 14 August 2025.

The opening film The Pavilion is a Bosnian dark comedy film directed by Dino Mustafić. The film is about elderly residents of a nursing home, who frustrated by years of abuse, arm themselves and rise up against the staff, resulting in a tense confrontation with law enforcement.

English title	Original title	Director(s)	Production country
Pre-opening film
Hanka (1955)		Slavko Vorkapić	Yugoslavia
Opening film
The Pavilion	Paviljon	Dino Mustafić	Bosnia and Herzegovina

=== Competition Programme - Feature Film ===
In the 'Competition Programme - Feature Film:, nine films will compete.

English title	Original title	Director(s)	Production country
DJ Ahmet		Georgi M. Unkovski	North Macedonia, Czech Republic, Serbia, Croatia
Fantasy		Kukla Kesherovic	Slovenia, North Macedonia
God Will Not Help	Bog Neće Pomoći	Hana Jušić	Croatia, Italy, Romania, Greece, France, Slovenia
Otter	Vidra	Srđan Vuletić	Montenegro, Bosnia and Herzegovina, Italy, Croatia, Kosovo
Sorella di Clausura		Ivana Mladenović	Romania, Serbia, Italy, Spain
Stars of Little Importance	Minden Csillag	Renátó Olasz	Hungary
Yugo Florida		Vladimir Tagić	Serbia, Bulgaria, France, Croatia, Montenegro
White Snail		Elsa Kremser and Levin Peter	Austria, Germany
Wind, Talk to Me	Vetre, Pričaj Sa Mnom	Stefan Đorđević	Serbia, Slovenia, Croatia

=== Competition programme - Documentary Film ===
There are 20 films in the Competition Programme – Documentary Film.

English title	Original title	Director(s)	Production country
9-Month Contract		Ketevan Vashagashvili	Georgia, Bulgaria, Germany
Bosnian Knight	Bosanski Vitez	Tarik Hodžić	Bosnia and Herzegovina, Croatia
Cuba & Alaska		Yegor Troyanovsky	Ukraine, France, Belgium
Divia		Dmytro Hreshko	Ukraine, Poland, The Netherlands, USA
Dreamers: People Of The Light	Xəyalpərəstlər: Işığın Uşaqları	Imam Hasanov	Azerbaijan
Everytime You Leave, You Are Born Again	Svaki Put Kad Odeš, Ponovo Se Rađaš	Mladen Bundalo	Bosnia and Herzegovina, Belgium
I Believe the Portrait Saved Me	Mua Besoj Më Shpëtoj Portreti	Alban Muja	Kosovo*, The Netherlands
In Hell With Ivo		Kristina Nikolova	Bulgaria, USA
I Saw a 'Suno'	Suno Dikhlem	Katalin Bársony	Hungary, Belgium
Kite	Chartaetos	Thanos Psichogios	Greece
Letters	Pisma	Aysel Küçüksu	Bulgaria
The Men's Land	Kacebis Mitsa	Mariam Khatchvani	Georgia, Hungary
Militantropos		Yelizaveta Smith, Alina Gorlova, Simon Mozgoviy	Ukraine, Austria, France
My Dad’s Lessons	Lekcije Mog Tate	Dalija Dozet	Croatia
Our Time Will Come	Unsere Zeit Wird Kommen	Ivette Löcker	Austria
Red Slide	Crveni Tobogan	Nebojša Slijepčević	Croatia
Steel Hotel Song		Bojan Stojčić	Bosnia and Herzegovina
Third World	Treći Svijet	Arsen Oremović	Croatia
Slet 1988		Marta Popivoda	Serbia, Germany, France
Tata		Lina Vdovîi, Radu Ciorniciuc	Romania, Germany, The Netherlands

=== Competition Programme - Short Film ===
In this category ten films will compete for the award.

English title	Original title	Director(s)	Production country
Berna's Eyes	Sytë E Bernës	Ermal Gërdovci	Kosovo, North Macedonia
Desert, She	Ierimos	Ioanna Digenaki	Greece
Procedure	Prosedür	Rabia Özmen	Türkiye
Alișveriș		Vasile Todinca	Romania
Eraserhead In A Knitted Shopping Bag		Lili Koss	Bulgaria
Hysterical Fit of Laughter	Histerični Napad Smeha	Matija Gluščević, Dušan Zorić	Serbia, Croatia
Index		Radu Muntean	Romania
The Spectacle		Bálint Kenyeres	Hungary, France
Upon Sunrise	Kad Svane	Stefan Ivančić	Serbia, Spain, Slovenia, Croatia
Winter in March	Lumi Saadab Meid	Natalia Mirzoyan	Armenia, Estonia, France, Belgium

=== Competition Programme - Student Film ===
There are 11 films in the Competition Programme - Student Film.

English title	Original title	Director(s)	Production country
After Class	Dupā Ore	Marius Papară	Romania
Found & Lost		Reza Rasouli	Austria
Home, a Space Between Us		Effi Rabsilber	Greece
Rahlo		Jozo Schmuch	Croatia
Tarik		Adem Tutić	Serbia
Curfew	Komendantska Hodyna	Yelyzaveta Toptyhina	Ukraine
Backstroke	Sırtüstü	Asya Günen	Türkiye
Living Stones	Élő Kövek	Jakob Ladányi Jancsó	Hungary
Milk And Cookies	Fursecuri Și Lapte	Andrei-Tache Codreanu	Romania
Peninsula	Poluotok	David Gašo	Croatia
Wish You Were Ear		Mirjana Balogh	Hungary

=== Out of Competition ===
English title	Original title	Director(s)	Production country
OHO Film		Damjan Kozole	Slovenia, Croatia
Man of the House		Andamion Murataj	Albania, Italy, Austria, Croatia, Kosovo, North Macedonia

=== In Focus ===
English title	Original title	Director(s)	Production country
Desire Lines	Linije Želje	Dane Komljen	Serbia, Bosnia-Herzegovina, Netherlands, Croatia, Germany
How Come It's All Green Out Here?	Kako je ovde tako zeleno?	Nikola Ležaić	Serbia, Croatia, Bulgaria
Kontinental '25		Radu Jude	Romania, Brazil, Switzerland, United Kingdom, Luxembourg
Little Trouble Girls	Kaj ti je deklica	Urška Djukić	Slovenia, Italy, Croatia, Serbia
Paleontology lesson		Sergei Loznitsa	Netherlands
Two Prosecutors	Два прокурора	Sergei Loznitsa	Latvia, France, Germany, Netherlands, Romania, Lithuania
Restitution or the Dream and Reality of the Old Guard	Слобода или барбаризам	Želimir Žilnik	Serbia, Slovenia

=== Open Air Programme ===
Open Air Program, consisting of two sections, Open Air and Open Air Premiere, line up as follows:

Open Air

English title	Original title	Director(s)	Production country
The Birthday Party		Miguel Ángel Jiménez	Greece, Spain, Netherlands, United Kingdom
Brides		Nadia Fall	United Kingdom
Case 137	Dossier 137	Dominik Moll	France
Dreams		Michel Franco	Mexico, United States
The Great Beauty (2013)	La grande bellezza	Paolo Sorrentino	Italy, France
Leave One Day	Partir un jour	Amélie Bonnin	France
The Pavilion (opening film)	Paviljon	Dino Mustafić	Bosnia and Herzegovina
Sentimental Value	Affeksjonsverdi	Joachim Trier	Norway, France, Germany, Denmark, Sweden, United Kingdom

Open Air Premiere

English title	Original title	Director(s)	Production country
Bosnian Knight	Bosanski Vitez	Tarik Hodžić	Bosnia and Herzegovina, Croatia
Cat's Cry	Mačji krik	Sanja Živković	Serbia, Canada, Croatia
Radio Rambo Amadeus		Dušan Varda	Serbia
Surviving Earth		Thea Gajić	United Kingdom
The Lost Dream Team	Izgubljeni Dream Team	Jure Pavlović	Croatia, Serbia, Italy, Slovenia
The Track		Ryan Sidhoo	Canada, Bosnia and Herzegovina
Whites Wash at Ninety	Belo Se Pere Na Devetdeset	Marko Naberšnik	Slovenia, Italy, Croatia, Serbia, Montenegro, North Macedonia

=== Special Screening - DFI Presents ===
Arab films at the festival:

English title	Original title	Director(s)	Production country
With Hasan in Gaza		Kamal Aljafari	Palestine, Germany, France, Qatar
Once Upon a Time in Gaza		Tarzan and Arab Nasser	France, Palestine, Germany, Portugal, Qatar, Jordan
Dead Dog		Sarah Francis	Lebanon

=== Dealing with the Past ===
English title	Original title	Director(s)	Production country
Also Resisters		Christina D. Bartson	United States
Facing War		Tommy Gulliksen	Norway, Iceland, Denmark, Finland, Sweden, Belgium
June Tuirmoil (1969)		Želimir Žilnik	Yugoslavia

=== Kinoscope ===
The Kinoscope programme features 19 films; 14 in the Kinoscope section and 5 in the Kinoscope Surreal section.

Cinemascope

English title	Original title	Director(s)	Production country
Happyend		Neo Sora	Japan, United States
Harvest		Athina Rachel Tsangari	United Kingdom, Germany, Greece, France, United States
Kika		Alexe Poukine	Belgium, France
The Love That Remains	Ástin Sem Eftir Er	Hlynur Pálmason	Iceland, Denmark, France, Finland, Sweden
The Mastermind		Kelly Reichardt	United States, United Kingdom
Phantoms of July	Sehnsucht in Sangerhausen	Julian Radlmaier	Germany
Put Your Soul on Your Hand and Walk (ŒdO)		Sepideh Farsi	France, Palestine, Iran
Romería		Carla Simón	Spain, Belgium, Germany
Sirāt		Oliver Laxe	Spain, France
Sound of Falling	In die Sonne schauen	Mascha Schilinski	Germany
Yes	כן!	Nadav Lapid	Israel, France, Germany, Cyprus, United Kingdom

Kinoscope Surreal

English title	Original title	Director(s)	Production country
Reflection in a Dead Diamond	Reflet dans un diamant mort	Hélène Cattet and Bruno Forzani	Belgium, Luxembourg, Italy, France
The Ice Tower	La Tour de Glace	Lucile Hadžihalilović	France, Germany, Italy
The Wailing	El llanto	Pedro Martín-Calero	Spain, France, Argentina

== BH Film Program ==
The 20th edition of the BH FILM Program, held as part of the festival and organized by the Association of Filmmakers of the Federation of Bosnia and Herzegovina, will showcase a selection of 43 films.

=== Feature films ===
- The Pavilion (Paviljon), Dino Mustafić, Bosnia and Herzegovina, Croatia, North Macedonia, Serbia, Montenegro
- Otter (Vidra), Srđan Vuletić, Montenegro, Bosnia and Herzegovina, Italy, Croatia, Kosovo

=== Feature-length Documentary Films ===
- Bloom - The Masters of Your Future, Jasmila Žbanić, Bosnia and Herzegovina, Germany
- Bosnian Knight (Bosanski Vitez), Tarik Hodžić, Bosnia and Herzegovina, Croatia
- Ćetiba, Ramiz Huremagić, Bosnia and Herzegovina
- Dom, Massimiliano Battistella, Bosnia and Herzegovina, Italy
- The Boy from the River Drina (Il ragazzo della Drina), Zijad Ibrahimović, Switzerland
- Kapija - The Oath to Tuzla’s Youth!, Damir Pirić, Bosnia and Herzegovina
- House With Heart, Sabahet Džafica, Bosnia and Herzegovina
- Butterflies Without Wings, Anel Džanković, Damir Kerla, Bosnia and Herzegovina
- Prison Beauty Contest (Miss Penitenciária), Srđan Šarenac, Serbia, Brazil, Bosnia and Herzegovina, Croatia
- The Mystical Canyon of Rakitnica, Rubina Smajić, Bosnia and Herzegovina
- Grandma Sena, Dino Omerović, Türkiye, Bosnia and Herzegovina
- No One Will Hurt You (Nessuno Vi Farà Del Male), Dino Hodić, Switzerland
- The Partisan Necropolis, Chris Leslie, UK, Bosnia and Herzegovina
- Family, Davorin Sekulić, Bosnia and Herzegovina
- None Will Speak The Truth, Azra Husarić Omerović, Bosnia and Herzegovina
- The Srebrenica Tape - From Dad, for Alisa, Chiara Sambuchi, Germany, Austria
- The Track, Ryan Sidhoo, Canada, Bosnia and Herzegovina

=== Short Documentary and Feature Films ===
- Anatomy of a Lost Sound, Zuko Garagic, Czech Republic, United States, Bosnia and Herzegovina
- A Distant Country, Edin Hurem, Bosnia and Herzegovina
- Joe, Vuk Rađen, Bosnia and Herzegovina
- Exam (Egzamin), Damir Mehić, Poland
- Hercules, Marko Dukić, Bosnia and Herzegovina, Serbia, Croatia
- Bullet in the Rifle, Karmen Obrdalj, Bosnia and Herzegovina, Serbia
- No Big Deal, Mirza Abdagić, Bosnia and Herzegovina
- Živa, Tamara Maksimović, Bosnia and Herzegovina
- Lavander, Mateja Raičković, Bosnia and Herzegovina, Montenegro
- Not Sure Where I Am, Enisa Adrović, Bosnia and Herzegovina, North Macedonia
- Piano Boxing, Saša Peševski, Bosnia and Herzegovina
- Pun Kura, Antonela Pehar Šimunović, Bosnia and Herzegovina
- Steel Hotel Song, Bojan Stojčić, Bosnia and Herzegovina
- Every Time You Leave, You Are Born Again, Mladen Bundalo, Bosnia and Herzegovina, Belgium
- Forgotten Stations, Zdenko Jurilj, Bosnia and Herzegovina

=== Student Films ===
- Illumination, Mina Vavan, Bosnia and Herzegovina
- About A Bull, Emir Solaković, Bosnia and Herzegovina
- A Pigeon, Vuk Popović, Bosnia and Herzegovina
- Beneath the Surface, Maja Ćetojević, Bosnia and Herzegovina
- The Summer Of My Summerbreak, Milica Vujasin, Bosnia and Herzegovina
- Rec, Fedor Marić, Bosnia and Herzegovina
- The Offering, Marko Brkić, Bosnia and Herzegovina

== Network of the Festivals in the Adriatic Region Programmes ==
Six prominent film festivals from Southeast Europe, Sarajevo Film Festival, Zagreb Film Festival, Auteur Film Festival, Belgrade, Ljubljana International Film Festival, Slovenia, Montenegro Film Festival, and the Manaki Brothers International Cinematographers’ Film Festival in North Macedonia, will in a collaborative platform showcase a total of seven films across its joint programmes:

=== Adriatic Audience Award ===
- Adam's Interest (L'intérêt d'Adam), Laura Wandel, Belgium, France
- Christy, Brendan Canty, Ireland, United Kingdom
- Maldoror, Fabrice Du Welz, Belgium, France
- Perla, Alexandra Makarova, Austria, Slovakia
- Renovation, Gabrielė Urbonaitė, Lithuania, Latvia, Belgium

Ecoscope

- Miyazaki, Spirit of Nature (Miyazaki: L'Esprit de la Nature), Léo Favier, France

Yugoslav classic

- The Boiling City , Veljko Bulajić, Yugoslavia, (1961)

== Awards ==
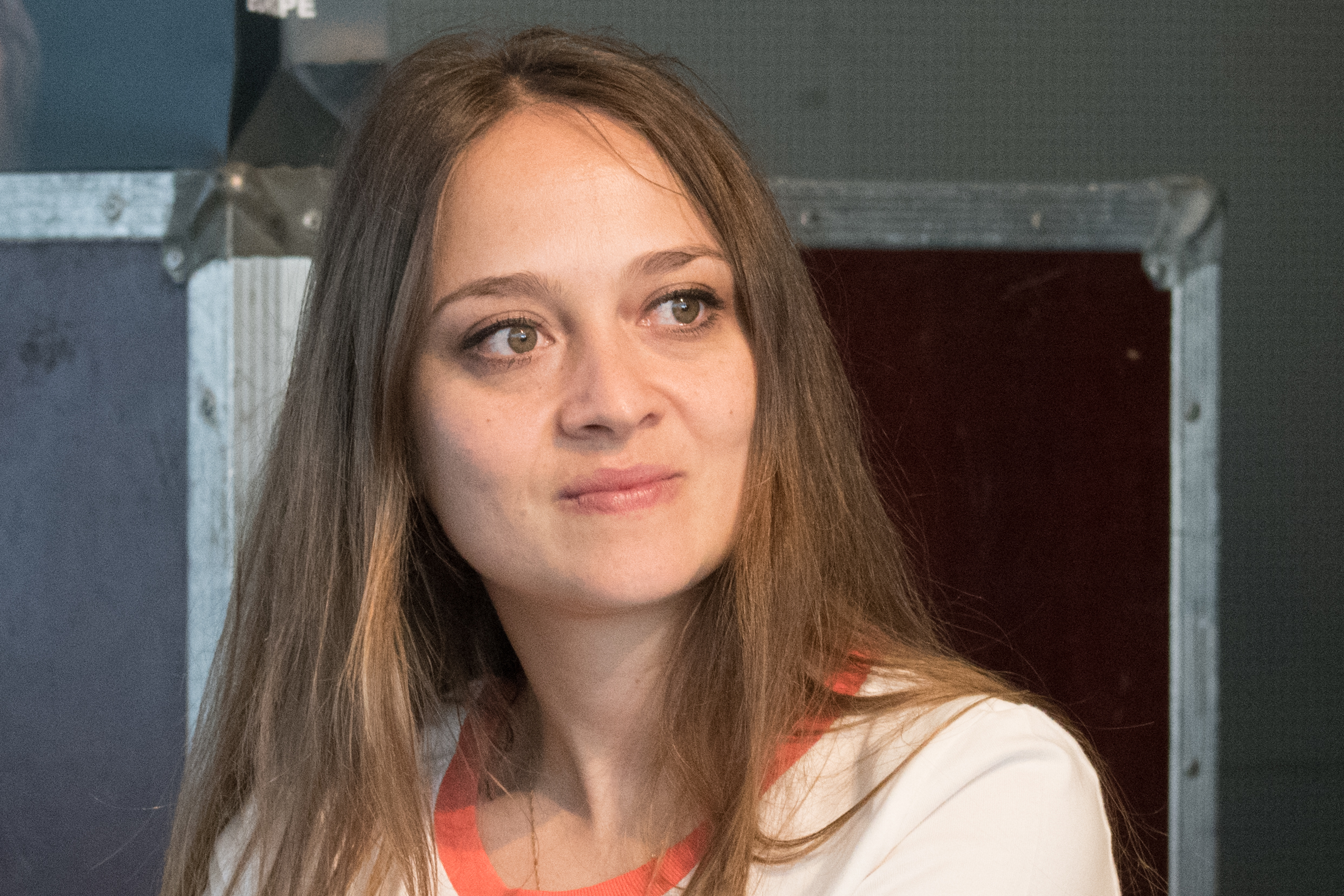
Ivana Mladenović, winner of the Heart of Sarajevo Award for Best Director

Winners of the festival are:

- Heart of Sarajevo for Best Feature Film: Wind, Talk to Me by Stefan Djordjevic
- Heart of Sarajevo Award for Best Director: Ivana Mladenović for Sorella di Clausura
- Heart of Sarajevo for Best Actor: Andrija Kuzmanović for Yugo Florida (film)
- Heart of Sarajevo for Best Actress: Sarah Al Saleh, Aline Juhart, Mina Milovanović, Mia Skrbinac for Fantasy
- Heart of Sarajevo for Best Documentary Film: Our Time Will Come, by Ivette Löcker
- Special Jury Prize for Documentary Film: In Hell With Ivo, by Kristina Nikolova
- Special Mention: I Believe the Portrait Saved Me, by Alban Muja
- Heart of Sarajevo for Best Short Film: Winter in March, by Natalia Mirzoyan
- Special Mention: Eraserhead in a Knitted Shopping Bag, by Lili Koss
- Heart of Sarajevo for Best Short Documentary Film: The Men's Land, by Mariam Khatchvani
- Heart of Sarajevo Award for Best Student Film: Tarik, by Adem Tutić
- Special Award for Promoting Gender Equality: God Will Not Help by Hana Jušić
- Special Environmental Awareness Award:
- Special Youth Perspectives Award: DJ Ahmet by Georgi M. Unkovski
- CineLink Female Voices award: Rain Country, Zeynep Köprülü

=== Partner's Awards ===
Partner's Awards for the festival:

- European Film Academy Short Film Candidate: Things Hidden Since the Foundation of the World, by Kevin Walker, Irene Zahariadis
- CICAE (International Confederation of Art Cinemas) Award: White Snail, Elsa Kremser and Levin Peter
- Cineuropa Prize: DJ Ahmet by Georgi M. Unkovski
- Ivica Matić Award:
  - Ishak Jalimam, Producer of the films The Sky Above Zenica and Gym
  - The award for overall contribution to Bosnian and Herzegovinian film: Zijad Mehić
- UniCredit Audience Award: DJ Ahmet by Georgi M. Unkovski
- The UniCredit Audience Award for Best Documentary Film: The Track, Ryan Sidhoo

=== Special awards ===
- Katrin Cartlidge Foundation Award: Christine Boateng, Ghanese producer, director and actress

==== Honorary Heart of Sarajevo ====
- Paolo Sorrentino, Italian film director, screenwriter, and writer.
- Stellan Skarsgård, Swedish actor
- Ray Winstone, English television, stage, and film actor
- Willem Dafoe, American actor. Known for his prolific career portraying diverse roles in both mainstream and arthouse films.
