= Corridor No. 8 =

2008 Bulgarian documentary film

- Directed by: Boris Despodov
- Written by: Boris Despodov
- Produced by: Martichka Bozhilova, AGITPROP
- Cinematography: Boris Missirkov, Georgi Bogdanov
- Edited by: Gergana Zlatanova, Boris Despodov
- Release date: 2008

Corridor No. 8 is a 2008 Bulgarian documentary film about the EU infrastructural project of the same name, which follows the ancient Via Egnatia and passes through Bulgaria, Macedonia and Albania. The film is written and directed by Boris Despodov and produced by Martichka Bozhilova from AGITPROP.

The film premiered at the Berlinale 2008, where it got the Special Mention of the Ecumenical Jury in the International Forum of New Cinema. At Hot Docs director Boris Despodov won the HBO award for a newcomer in documentary cinema. The film also won Best Documentary Award at Sarajevo Film Festival. It was aired on HBO in September 2009.

== Synopsis ==
With Bulgaria joining the EU, the country was incorporated in the EU infrastructural plans. Among the promised projects was the establishing of the Pan-European Corridor VIII, which would provide a better, quicker and more efficient in lieu of the then existing roads, on which a person needed three days to drive a distance of 324 kilometers. The movie leads its viewers on a road trip on this non-existent highway between Sofia and Tirana, which is why it is sometimes dubbed as 'a non-road movie'. According to Variety reviewer Jay Weissberg, the movie reveals "a people mistrustful of their neighbors and unimpressed by grand claims from local and European politicos".
