= RomArchive =

Digital repository of Romani culture

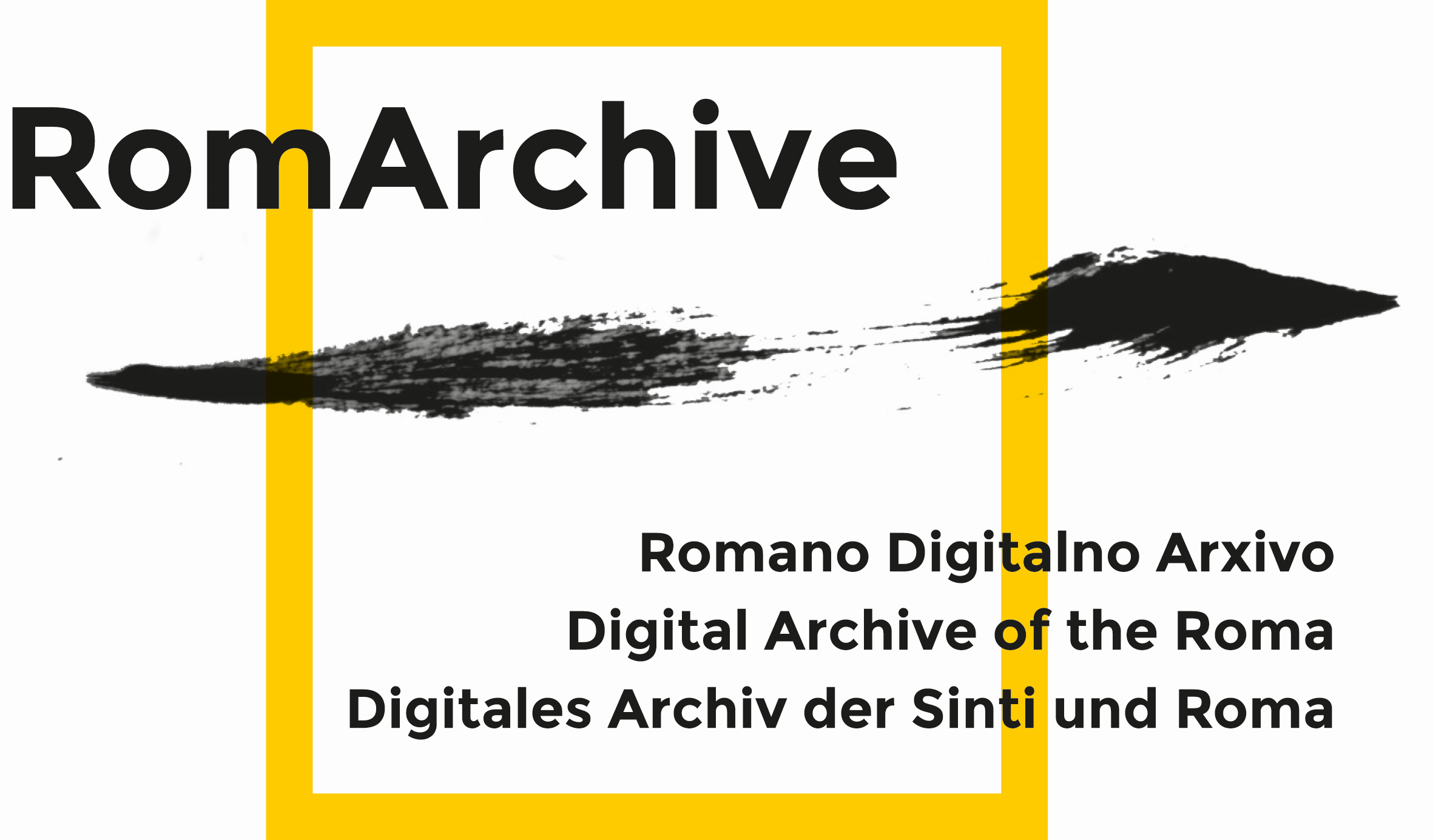
- Logo
- Formation: 2015
- Purpose: Archive and promote Romani culture
- Official language: English, German, Romani
- Key people: Isabel Raabe, Franziska Sauerbrey
- Awards: European Union Prize for Cultural Heritage (2019), Grimme-Preis (2020)
- Website: https://www.romarchive.eu./en/

The RomArchive is a digital repository of Romani culture, established in 2015. Fourteen curators organised 5,000 objects, available in English, German and Romani. The archive has won a European Union Prize for Cultural Heritage and a Grimme-Preis.

== Project ==
The RomArchive was established in 2015 as a digital repository of Romani culture. The German Federal Cultural Foundation was the largest initial sponsor, providing €3.75 million. The founders were Isabel Raabe and Franziska Sauerbrey. The project covers areas such as dance, film, literature and flamenco. Filmmaker Katalin Bársony curated a selection of 35 films which authentically present Romani culture, one being Taikon by Lawen Mohtadi. The visual arts collection is curated by Tímea Junghaus and photography by André Raatzsch. In total there are fourteen curators.

The archive contains 5,000 objects and is available in English, German and Romani. The Documentation and Cultural Centre of German Sinti and Roma took over the sponsorship of the RomArchive in 2019, on International Romani Day. The same year, the archive won a European Union Prize for Cultural Heritage. In 2020, it also won a Grimme-Preis.
