= Scary Mother (film) =

2017 film

- Film poster
- Directed by: Ana Urushadze
- Written by: Ana Urushadze
- Starring: Nato Murvanidze
- Release date: 3 August 2017 (Locarno)
- Running time: 107 minutes
- Country: Georgia
- Language: Georgian

Scary Mother (Georgian: საშიში დედა; Sashishi Deda) is a 2017 Georgian drama film directed by Ana Urushadze. At the 23rd Sarajevo Film Festival, the film won the top prize, the Heart of Sarajevo. It was selected as the Georgian entry for the Best Foreign Language Film at the 90th Academy Awards, but it was not nominated. Actress, Nato Murvanidze won the award for Best Performance by an Actress at the 2017 Asia Pacific Screen Awards for her performance in the film.

== Plot ==
Manana, a middle-aged woman, hopes to find herself by secretly penning a darkly erotic thriller. She hides the writing from her husband Anri, but tensions heighten after she lets him read an excerpt.

== Cast ==
- Nato Murvanidze as Manana
- Dimitri Tatishvili as Anri
- Ramaz Ioseliani as Nukri
- Avtandil Makharadze as Jarji

== See also ==
- List of submissions to the 90th Academy Awards for Best Foreign Language Film
- List of Georgian submissions for the Academy Award for Best Foreign Language Film
