= Dede (2017 film) =

- Film poster
- Original title: დედე
- Directed by: Mariam Khatchvani
- Written by: Mariam Khatchvani; Vladimer Katcharava; Irakli Solomanashvili
- Produced by: Vladimer Katcharava
- Starring: George Babluani
- Cinematography: Kostantin Mindia Esadze
- Edited by: Levan Kukhashvili
- Music by: Tako Jordania; Mate Chamgeliani
- Release date: 2 August 2017 (Karlovy Vary)
- Running time: 97 minutes
- Countries: Georgia; Croatia; United Kingdom; Ireland; Netherlands; Qatar
- Languages: Georgian; Svan

Dede (Georgian: დედე; Dede) is a 2017 Georgian drama film directed by Mariam Khatchvani. It had an international premiere in the Karlovy Vary International Film Festival and screened in East Of West section where it won Special Mention prize. The film is an international co-production between Georgia, Croatia, the United Kingdom, Ireland, the Netherlands and Qatar.

== Cast ==
- George Babluani
- Natia Vibliani
- Girshel Chelidze
- Nukri Khatchvani
- Spartak Parjiani
- Sofia Charkviani
- Mose Khatchvani

== Plot ==
The film chronicles a young woman facing a freedom limiting oppressive culture where bride kidnapping and arranged marriages lead to lethal family feuds.

== Reception ==
On review aggregator website Rotten Tomatoes, the film has a 100% approval rating based on 6 reviews, with an average rating of 9/10.

Stephen Dalton of The Hollywood Reporter wrote: "Feminism meets fatalism in this starkly beautiful Georgian melodrama".
