= Dino Mustafić =

Bosnian film and theatre director (born 1969)

Dino Mustafić Дино Мустафић
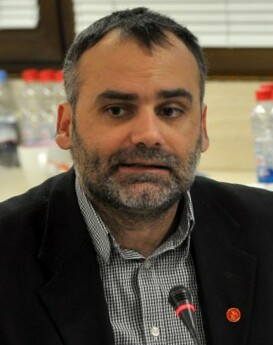
- Mustafić in 2012
- Born: 6 July 1969 (age 57); Sarajevo, SR Bosnia and Herzegovina, SFR Yugoslavia
- Education: University of Sarajevo
- Occupations: Theatre director, film director
- Years active: 1991–present
- Political party: Our Party (2008–present)

Dino Mustafić (Serbo-Croatian Cyrillic: Дино Мустафић; born 6 July 1969) is a Bosnian film and theater director. He is the current director of ICIKUM Novo Sarajevo (International Center for Dance, Culture, Art, and Youth Novo Sarajevo).

== Biography ==
Mustafić was born in Sarajevo, at the time part of socialist Yugoslavia, the son of renowned cinematographer, Mustafa Mustafić. He graduated from the Academy of Performing Arts in Sarajevo, Department of Directing, and the Faculty of Humanities, Department of Comparative literature of the University of Sarajevo.

Mustafić has previously held the position of managing director of the MESS International Theater Festival from 1997 until 2016. In 2017, he signed the Declaration on the Common Language of the Croats, Serbs, Bosniaks and Montenegrins. In January 2026, Mustafić was appointed director of ICIKUM Novo Sarajevo (International Center for Dance, Culture, Art, and Youth Novo Sarajevo).

== Politics ==
Together with Academy Award-winning director and friend Danis Tanović, Mustafić founded Our Party in 2008. Since 2011, he has been a public advocate of the Initiative for RECOM in Bosnia and Herzegovina.

== Notable stagework ==
- Sartre's The Wall and Dirty Hands
- Ionesco's The Rhinoceros and The King Dies
- Mroźek's On Foot and Policemen
- Moliėr's Tartif
- Koltės's Roberto Zucco
- Shakespeare's Macbeth
- Wilder's Saved by a Hair
- Schwab's Presidents
- Boychev's Colonel of the Birds and Hannibal Underground
- Gardner's I'm Not Rappaport
- Villqist's Helver's Night
- Loher's Adam Geist
- Nick Wood's Warrior's Square
- Głowacki's The Fourth Sister
- Martin McDonagh's Cripple Billy

== Filmography ==
Year	Film	Director	Writer	Screenplay	Notes
1995	Miracle in Bosnia	Yes	No	No	Co-directed with Danis Tanović
1998	Made in Sarajevo	Yes	Yes	Yes	Documentary film; co-directed with Elmir Jukić
2003	Remake	Yes	No	No	
2025	The Pavilion	Yes	No	No	
