= List of Kosovan films =

This is a list of films produced in Kosovo.

== B ==
- Babai (2015)

== C ==
- A Cup of Coffee and New Shoes On (2022)

== D ==
- Displaced (2021)

== E ==
- Exile (2020)

== H ==
- The Hill Where Lionesses Roar (2021)
- Hive (2021)
- Home (2016)
- Home Sweet Home (2016)
- Housekeeping for Beginners (2023)

== I ==
- Illyricvm (2022)

== M ==
- Man of Soil (1984)
- The Marriage (2017)

== S ==
- Sk (2014)
- Sworn Virgin (2015)

== T ==
- The Tenor (2014)
- Three Windows and a Hanging (2014)

== U ==
- Unwanted (2017)

== V ==
- Vera Dreams of the Sea (2021)

== Z ==
- Zana (2019)

== See also ==
- Cinema of Kosovo
- List of Kosovan submissions for the Academy Award for Best Foreign Language Film
- List of Serbian films of 2014
