= Tjvjik =

Tjvjik may refer to:

- Tjvjik (food), an Armenian dish
- Tjvjik, the classic story of the writer Atrpet
- Tjvjik (film), a 1962 Soviet Armenian short film by Arman Manaryan
