= List of Kosovan submissions for the Academy Award for Best International Feature Film =

List of films

Best International Feature Film submissions from Kosovo

Highlights
- Debut: 2014
- Submissions: 10
- Nominations: none
- Oscar winners: none

Kosovo submitted a film for the Academy Award for Best International Feature Film (Note: The category was previously named the Academy Award for Best Foreign Language Film, but this was changed to the Academy Award for Best International Feature Film in April 2019, after the Academy deemed the word "Foreign" to be outdated.) for the first time in 2014, six years after its independence. The award is handed out annually by the United States Academy of Motion Picture Arts and Sciences (AMPAS) to a feature-length motion picture produced outside the United States that contains primarily non-English dialogue. It was not created until the 1956 Academy Awards, in which a competitive Academy Award of Merit, known as the Best Foreign Language Film Award, was created for non-English speaking films, and has been given annually since.

Even though Kosovo is not fully internationally recognized as an independent state by many countries, although recognized by the United States, AMPAS granted the territory autonomy to submit films for the category, following the same rules granted to Hong Kong, Greenland and Palestine.

As of 2026, Kosovo has submitted ten films, but none of them were nominated.

== Submissions ==
The Academy of Motion Picture Arts and Sciences has invited the film industries of various countries to submit their best film for the Academy Award for Best International Feature Film since 1956. The International Feature Film Committee oversees the process and reviews all the submitted films. Following this, they vote via secret ballot to determine the five nominees for the award.

Hive (2021), directed by Blerta Basholli, advanced to the December shortlists, but was not nominated.

Most of the films submitted are primary in Albanian, with the exception of Exile (2020), which is mainly in German. Below is a list of the films that have been submitted by Kosovo for review by the academy for the award by year and the respective Academy Awards ceremony.

| Year (Ceremony) | Film title used in nomination | Original title | Language(s) | Director | Result |
|---|---|---|---|---|---|
| 2014 (87th) | Three Windows and a Hanging | Tri Dritare dhe një Varje | Albanian | Isa Qosja | Not nominated |
| 2015 (88th) | Babai | | Albanian | Visar Morina | Not nominated |
| 2016 (89th) | Home Sweet Home | Home Sweet Home | Albanian | Faton Bajraktari | Not nominated |
| 2017 (90th) | Unwanted | T'padashtun | Albanian, Dutch | Edon Rizvanolli | Not nominated |
| 2018 (91st) | The Marriage | Martesa | Albanian | Blerta Zeqiri | Not nominated |
| 2019 (92nd) | Zana | | Albanian | Antoneta Kastrati | Not nominated |
| 2020 (93rd) | Exile | Exil | German, Albanian | Visar Morina | Not nominated |
| 2021 (94th) | Hive | Zgjoi | Albanian | Blerta Basholli | Made shortlist |
| 2022 (95th) | Looking for Venera | Në kërkim të Venerës | Albanian | Norika Sefa | Not nominated |
| 2026 (99th) | Dua | | Albanian, Serbian | Blerta Basholli | Pending |

== See also ==
- List of Albanian submissions for the Academy Award for Best International Feature Film
- List of Serbian submissions for the Academy Award for Best International Feature Film
- List of Yugoslav submissions for the Academy Award for Best International Feature Film
- List of Academy Award winners and nominees for Best International Feature Film
- List of Academy Award-winning foreign language films
