= List of Serbian films of 2014 =

The Serbian film industry produced over 20 feature films in 2014. This article fully lists all non-pornographic films, including short films, that had a release date in that year and which were at least partly made by Serbia. It does not include films first released in previous years that had release dates in 2014. It does, however, include films produced by Kosovo (whose sovereignty is disputed), which are also included in List of Kosovan films of 2014.
Also included is an overview of the major events in Serbian film, including film festivals and awards ceremonies, as well as lists of those films that have been particularly well received, both critically and financially.

== Major releases ==
Opening		Title	Cast and Crew	Studio	Genre(s)	Ref.
J A N U A R Y	14	See You in Montevideo	Director: Dragan Bjelogrlić; Cast: Milos Bikovic, Petar Strugar Predrag Vasic	Intermedia Network	Comedy	
J A N U A R Y	20	The Disobedient	Director: Mina Djukic; Cast: Hana Selimović, Mladen Sovilj, Minja Subota, Danijel Šike, Ivan Đorđević, Dunja Tatić, Žarko Radić	Sundance Channel	Drama	
M A R C H	14	Ironclad: Battle for Blood	Director: Jonathan English; Cast: Roxanne McKee, Michelle Fairley, Danny Webb, Tom Austen	Content Media	Adventure	
J U L Y	8	Monument to Michael Jackson	Director: Darko Lungulov; Cast: Boris Milivojevic		Comedy	
A U G U S T	19	Three Windows and a Hanging	Director: Isa Qosja; Cast: Irena Cahani		Drama	
A U G U S T	29	These Are the Rules	Director: Ognjen Sviličić; Cast: Emir Hadžihafizbegović, Jasna Žalica, Hrvoje Vladisavljević	Maxima film	Drama	
S E P T E M B E R	4	No One's Child	Director: Vuk Ršumović; Cast: Denis Muric, Pavle Čemerikić		Drama	
O C T O B E R	14	The Man Who Defended Gavrilo Princip	Director: Srđan Koljević; Cast: Nikola Rakočević, Vuk Kostić		Biography; Drama	

== Minor releases ==
Title	Director	Release Date	Genre
Ariadne's Thread	Vitorio De Janeiro		Drama
Barbarians	Ivan Ikic	4 September 2014 (Serbia)	Drama
Blackness	Luka Bursac	9 April 2014 (Serbia)	Drama
Children of the Sun	Antonio Mitriceski	25 September 2014 (UK)	Comedy
Equals	Mladen Djordjevic	13 March 2015 (Serbia)	Drama
Fifth Butterfly	Milorad Milinkovic	23 December 2014 (Serbia)	Family
Hladna Ulica	Dimitrije Markov	30 September 2014 (Serbia)	Drama
Holidays in the Sun	Srdjan Dragojevic	3 April 2014 (Montenegro)	Drama
Little Buddho	Danilo Beckovic	24 September 2014 (Serbia)	Comedy
Love Isn't Always on Time	Ivan Stefanovic	3 January 2014 (Serbia)	Drama
Nymph	Milan Todorovic	1 May 2014 (Serbia)	Drama
So Hot Was the Cannon	Slobodan Skerlic	15 January 2015 (Serbia)	Drama
Strange Forest	Szabolcs Tolnai	10 September 2015 (Serbia)	Drama
The Bridge at the End of the World	Branko Ištvančić	1 January 2015 (Croatia)	Action
The Healing	Ivan Jovic	10 December 2015 (Serbia)	Drama
The Hero	Luan Kryeziu	18 February 2014 (Kosovo)	Drama
The Tenor	Sang Man Kim	11 October 2014 (Japan)	Biography
To moram	Branko Radakovic	28 February 2014 (Serbia)	Drama
Travelator	Dusan Milic	20 November 2014 (Serbia)	Action

== See also ==
- 2014 in film
- 2014 in Serbia
- Cinema of Serbia
- Serbian submissions for the Academy Award - Best Foreign Language Film Category
