= Blerta (name) =

Blerta is an Albanian female given name, which means "green" or blossom, from the Albanian blertë. The male equivalent is Blerti. The name may refer to:

- Blerta Basholli (born 1983), Kosovan writer, director and producer
- Blerti Hajdari (born 1990), Albanian football player
- Blerta Kaqiu (born 1992), Kosovar footballer
- Blerta Smaili (born 2002), Kosovan-Albanian German footballer
- Blerta Zeqiri (born 1979), Kosovar film director
