= Hive (2021 film) =

2021 drama film

- Sundance release poster
- Directed by: Blerta Basholli
- Written by: Blerta Basholli
- Produced by: Yll Uka; Valon Bajgora; Agon Uka
- Starring: Yllka Gashi; Çun Lajçi; Aurita Agushi
- Cinematography: Alex Bloom
- Edited by: Félix Sandri; Enis Saraçi
- Music by: Julien Painot
- Production companies: Ikone Studio; Industria Film; AlbaSky Film; Alva Film; Black Cat Production
- Distributed by: Zeitgeist Films
- Release dates: January 31, 2021 (Sundance); November 9, 2021 (United States)
- Running time: 84 minutes
- Countries: Kosovo; Switzerland; Albania; North Macedonia
- Language: Albanian

Hive (Albanian: Zgjoi) is a 2021 drama film written and directed by Blerta Basholli in her directorial debut. The film stars Yllka Gashi, Çun Lajçi and Aurita Agushi. It premiered at the 2021 Sundance Film Festival on January 31, 2021 and became the first film in Sundance history to win all three main awards – the Grand Jury Prize, the Audience Award and the Directing Award – in the World Cinema Dramatic Competition. It was selected as the Kosovan entry for the Best International Feature Film at the 94th Academy Awards. Ultimately, it was not nominated.

== Premise ==
The movie is based on the true story of a woman, Fahrije, who goes against misogynistic societal expectations to become an entrepreneur after her husband went missing during the 1998–1999 Kosovo War. She starts selling her own ajvar and honey, recruiting other women in the process.

Fahrije’s husband has been missing since the war in Kosovo, and along with their grief, her family is struggling financially. In order to provide for them she launches a small agricultural business, but in the traditional patriarchal village where she lives, her ambition and efforts to empower herself and other women are not seen as positive things. She struggles not only to keep her family afloat but also against a hostile community who is rooting for her to fail.

== Cast ==
- Yllka Gashi as Fahrije
- Çun Lajçi as Haxhi
- Aurita Agushi as Zamira
- Kumrije Hoxha as Nazmije
- Adriana Matoshi as Lume
- Molikë Maxhuni as Emine
- Blerta Ismaili as Edona

== Production ==
The film was produced by Ikone Studio, Industria Film and was co-produced by AlbaSky Film, Alva Film, and Black Cat Production.

== Release ==
The film had its world premiere at the 2021 Sundance Film Festival on January 31, 2021 in the World Cinema Dramatic Competition section. On September 8, 2021, Zeitgeist Films and Kino Lorber acquired the film's U.S. distribution rights and set it for a November 5, 2021 theatrical release in the United States.

== Reception ==
On the review aggregator website Rotten Tomatoes, 100% of 75 critics' reviews are positive, with an average rating of 7.8/10. The website's consensus reads: "Anchored by Yllka Gashi's outstanding performance, Hive leads viewers on one woman's fact-based quest for self-determination in a patriarchal society."

== Accolades ==
Award	Date of ceremony	Category	Recipient(s)	Result	Ref.
Sundance Film Festival	February 3, 2021	Audience Award: World Cinema Dramatic	Blerta Basholli	Won	
Sundance Film Festival	February 3, 2021	World Cinema Grand Jury Prize: Dramatic	Blerta Basholli	Won	
Sundance Film Festival	February 3, 2021	Directing Award: World Cinema Dramatic	Blerta Basholli	Won	

== See also ==
- Cinema of Kosovo
- List of submissions to the 94th Academy Awards for Best International Feature Film
- List of Kosovan submissions for the Academy Award for Best International Feature Film
- Honeyland
