= Tjvjik (food) =

Armenian liver dish

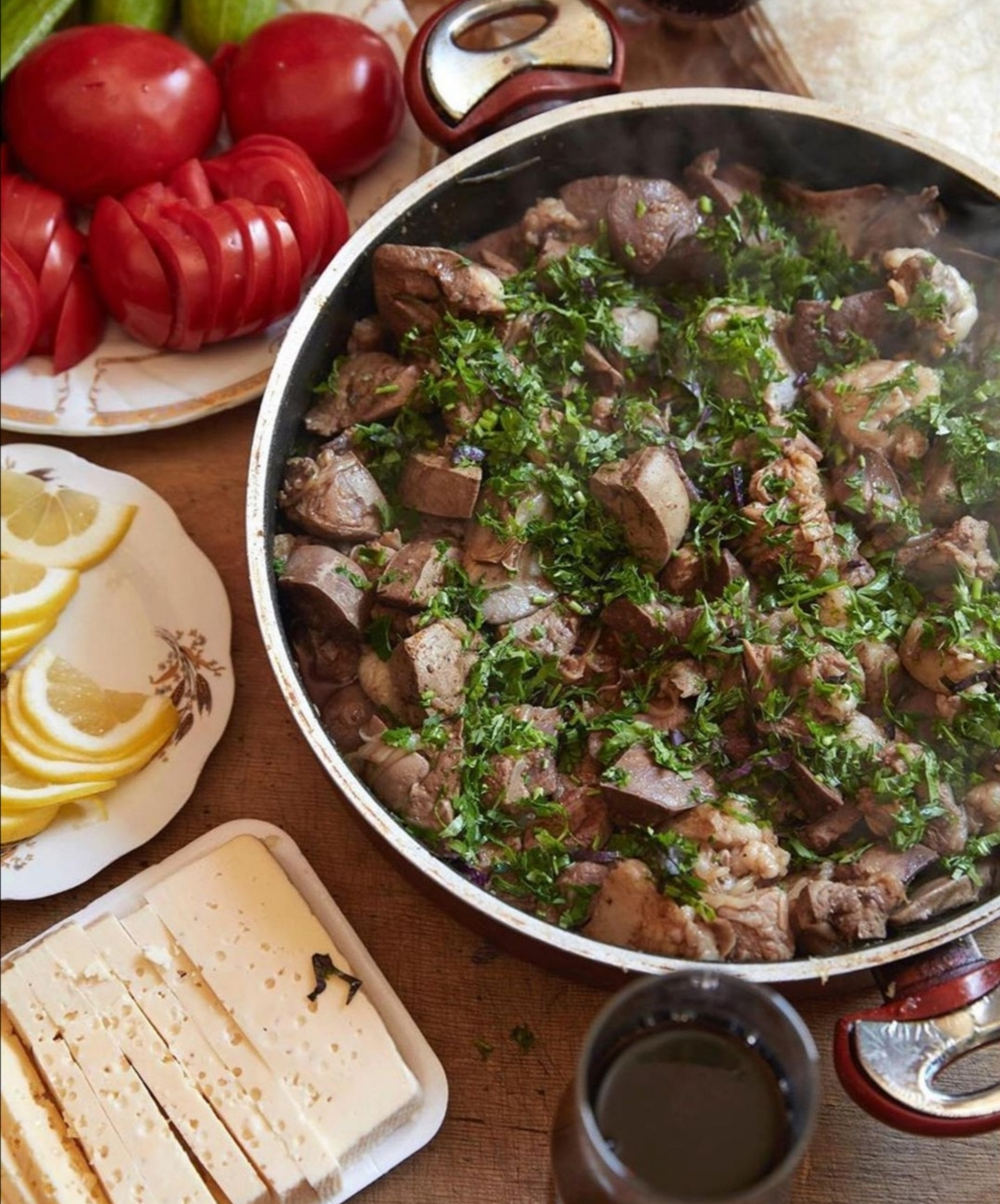
- Traditional tjvjik
- Type: meat dish
- Course: Main
- Place of origin: Armenia
- Associated cuisine: Armenian cuisine
- Serving temperature: Hot
- Main ingredients: offal; onion; salt; pepper; parsley

Tjvjik, tzhvzhik or dzhvzhig (Armenian: տժվժիկ) is an Armenian dish which is mainly based on liver (lamb, beef, pork or chicken). In addition to liver it can include any other offal. It is considered an easy dish to prepare.

== Etymology ==
From Armenian: տժվժալ ("to make hissing sounds") + -իկ (diminutive suffix), probably because of the sound of frying.

== Preparation and ingredients ==
After unwrapping the liver, the bile is removed, and the lungs are washed. The kidneys are also unwrapped and cut in half. The weasand (esophagus) is turned inside out and well-washed. Prepared offal and tail fat are washed, cut into equal pieces, put in a pan and fried until half-cooked. Then chopped onion is added, along with tomato purée (optional), salt, and pepper. The pan should be covered with a lid to cook tjvjik until tender. The dish is usually served with parsley.

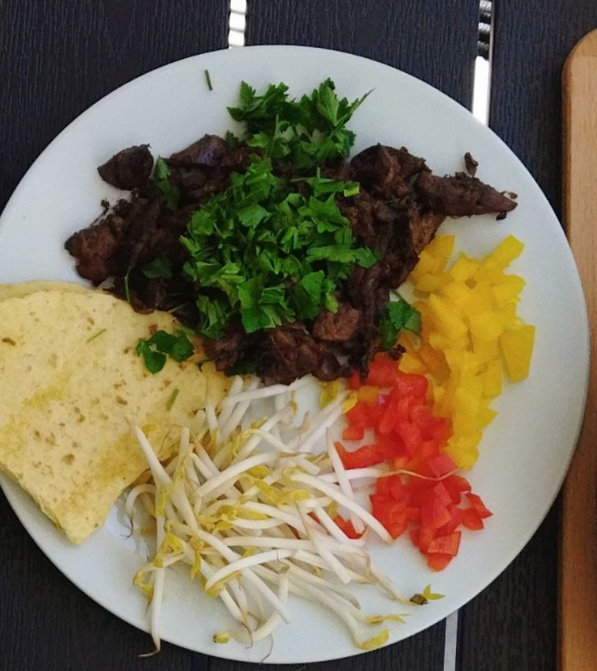
Tjvjik with mung sprouts

== In popular culture ==
In the story of the writer Atrpet (Sarkis Mubaiyajyan), the plot revolves around a piece of liver that a rich man gives to a poor man. The story was screened in 1961 as a short film by Arman Manaryan at the Armenfilm studio and became the first ever film in the Western Armenian language.

According to the book Armenian Food: Fact, Fiction & Folklore, the expression "don't make a story about tzhvzhik" became part of Armenian colloquial language. It's used when there is too much curiosity or a bit too much talk about a particular dish and how tasty it is.

In 2006, DJ Serjo, one of the most notable Armenian house music producers, released his first album named Tjvjik.

== See also ==
- Dolma
- Hash
- Arnavut ciğeri
- Jerusalem mixed grill

== Bibliography ==
- Г. Х. Порсугян; А. С. Пирузян, eds. (1984). "Tjvjik". Армянская кулинария [Armenian Cuisine] (3-е изд., перераб. и доп 50000 экз ed.). Ереван: Айастан. p. 107.
- Kashin S. P. (2015). "Tjvjik, an offal dish". Cookery of the USSR. The best dishes (in origin: Кулинария СССР. Лучшие блюда). Ваш домашний повар (series) (3000 экз ed.). М.: РИПОЛ классик. ISBN 978-5-386-08117-1.
- Breyova, G. A. (2016). "Tjvjik". Gayane-jan cuisine. Armenian Culinary Recipes: My Gastronomic History (in origin: Кухня Гаяне-джан. Армянские кулинарные рецепты: моя гастрономическая история). Кулинария. Авторская кухня (3000 экз ed.). Ростов-на-Дону: Феникс. ISBN 978-5-222-26551-2.
