= Qosja =

Qosja may refer to:

- Isa Qosja (born 1949), Albanian film director
- Rexhep Qosja (1936–2026), Albanian writer, literary critic and academic
- Cusae or several similarly-named places in Egypt
