= Adem Mikullovci =

Kosovo Albanian actor and politician (1937–2020)

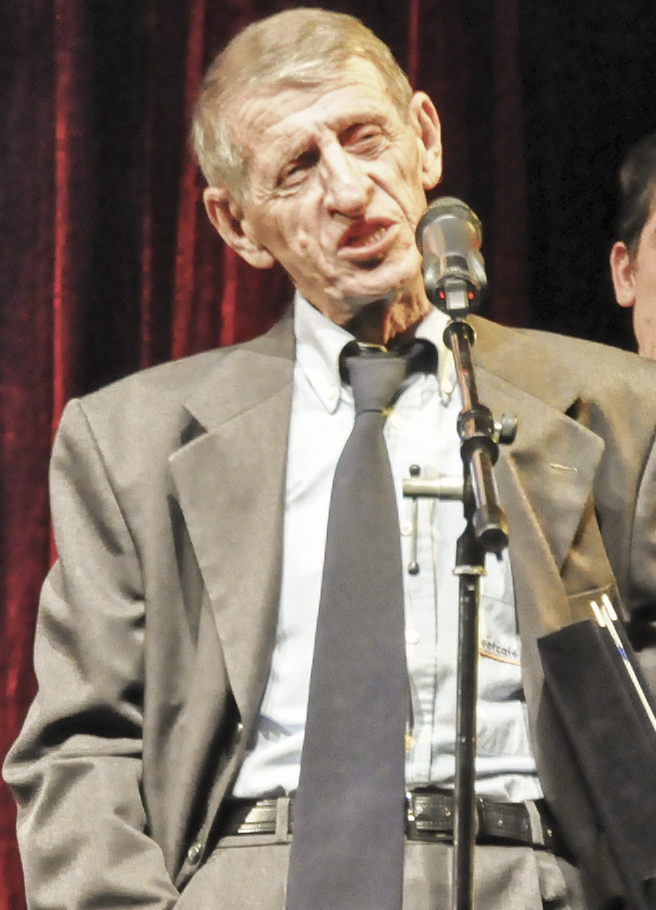
- Mikullovci speaking at a festival in 2012

Chairman of the Assembly Acting
- In office 29 June 2017 – 7 September 2017
- Preceded by: Kadri Veseli
- Succeeded by: Kadri Veseli

Member of the Assembly of the Republic of Kosovo
- In office 03 August 2017 – 22 August 2019

Personal details
- Born: Adem Mikullovci; December 21, 1937 Vučitrn, Kingdom of Yugoslavia
- Died: 15 September 2020 (aged 82) Pristina, Kosovo
- Party: Vetëvendosje (2017–2020)
- Spouse: Lumnije Mikullovci
- Occupation: Actor, Politician

Adem Mikullovci (21 December 1937 – 15 September 2020) was a Kosovo Albanian actor and politician. He was a member of the Parliament of the Republic of Kosovo. As an actor, he participated in the constellation of the actors of the former People's Provincial Theater of Kosovo (now Kosovo National Theater). After dropping out of studies at the Academy of Theater and Film in Belgrade in 1968, he returned to Pristina and started working at the theater. From that year (1968) to July 1990, Adem Mikullovci made a career with 45 main roles and about 70 roles in theatrical performances.

== Theatrical career ==
Mikullovci belongs to the generation of Albanian actors of the former People's Provincial Theatre of Kosovo (now the National Theatre of Kosovo). After he terminated his studies at the Academy of Film and Theatre in Belgrade in 1968, he returned to the theater in Pristina, the capital of Kosovo, and began his acting career. From that year 1968 up to 1990, he played 45 main and 70 supporting roles in plays in Albanian, such as Waiting for Godot (1977), I'm Going to Hunt, The Man Who Saw His Death, Love, The Straw Hotel, End of the World, Fly in the Ear, and Ervehe. Mikullovci was also the producer of several theatrical plays, including After Death (Cajupi), The Age of Whiteness (D. Agolli), Dan The Devil, Angel Of The Station, The Bed, and The Listener; a stand-up comedy produced in 2011.

== Political career ==
In 1990 he was among the deputies of the Kosovo Assembly who promulgated the Constitutional Declaration of 2 July.

Mikullovci re-entered into politics when he joined Vetëvendosje in May 2017, a party he had been a long time supporter of. In the 2017 Kosovan parliamentary election, he won a seat in parliament. As the oldest person in parliament, he acted as the chairman of the assembly between June and September 2017 until full-time candidate Kadri Veseli was re-elected by parliament.

== Death ==
Mikullovci died at 12:20 am on September 15, 2020.

== Work ==
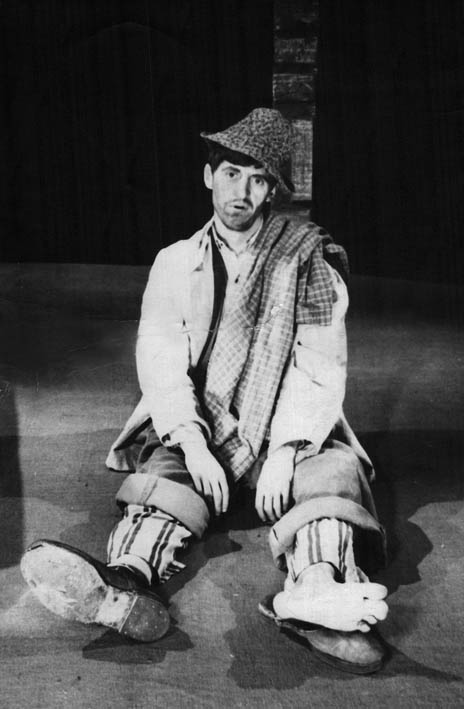
Mikullovci as actor in Waiting for Godot

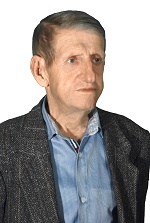
Mikullovci as member of Assembly of the Republic of Kosovo

=== Movies ===
- Proka - 1984, Kosovafilm - acting
- Kur pranvera vonohet - 1980 Kosovafilm - acting
- Era dhe Lisi - 1979 Kosovafilm - acting
- Crveni udar - 1974 Kosovafilm - acting
- Kad sam bio vojnik - 1969 Zastava Film - acting

=== Television ===
- Çka Ka Shpija
- Kafeneja Jonë (2004–2013; 2016–2017; 2020 special) - acting
- Oda e Junikut - (TV Show) - directing/acting
- Duke pritur Godon - 1977 (TV Show) - acting
- Ditari i Lec Pazhecit - 1975 (Comedy) - acting
- Qesh e Ngjesh - 1982 (TV Show)
- Gëzuar Viti i Ri - 1976 (TV Show)
- Burlesque - (Comedy) - directing/acting

=== Direct-to-video ===
- Vjeshtë e zymtë e profesor Nexhatit (2000)
- Kur do të kthehet Remziu (1999)
- Katunar e shehërli (2003)
- Mahmutovitët dhe Rexhepovitët (2001)
- Mëhalla jonë (2000)
- Qëndresa
- Sadri Llapjani (2003)
- Mësuesi (1998)
- Një pallto për babain tim në burg (1997)
- Një buqet buzqeshje (1999)
- Të gjithë me ne (2002)
- Martesa e Bariut (2005)
- Humor për Librin2004
- Një nuse për Lisin (2007)
