= The Albanian =

2010 German-Albanian drama film

- Directed by: Johannes Naber
- Written by: Johannes Naber
- Produced by: Boris Schönfelder; Dritan Huqi
- Starring: Nik Xhelilaj; Xhejlane Tërbunja; Ivan Shvedoff; Amos Zaharia; Stipe Erceg; Çun Lajçi; Yllka Mujo; André Hennicke
- Cinematography: Sten Mende
- Edited by: Ben Von Grafenstein
- Music by: Oliver Biehler
- Distributed by: Arte; Neue Schönhauser Filmproduktion; On Film Production; Südwestrundfunk (SWR)
- Release dates: June 23, 2010 (Moscow); June 28, 2010 (Germany); October 30, 2010 (Albania)
- Running time: 105 minutes
- Countries: Albania; Germany
- Languages: Albanian; German

The Albanian (German: Der Albaner, Albanian: Shqiptari) is a 2010 German-Albanian drama film directed by Johannes Naber and starring the Albanian actor Nik Xhelilaj.

== Plot ==
For the sake of love and the situations imposed by the life in his country, Arben emigrates to Germany. An illegal emigration, in search of money, a subtle condition to protect his love; an adventure that unintentionally confronts him with the unmerciful world of crime.

== Cast ==
- Nik Xhelilaj as Arben Shehu
- Xhejlane Tërbunja as Etleva Petriti
- Ivan Shvedoff as Slatko
- Amos Zaharia as Ilir Shehu
- Stipe Erceg as Damir
- Eva Löbau as Nicola
- Çun Lajçi as Arben's father
- Luan Jaha as Arben's uncle
- Yllka Mujo as Etleva's mother
- Guljelm Radoja as Etleva's father
- Bruno Shllaku as Sali
- Julian Deda as Florenç
- Besmir Halitaj as Taulant
- Ledio Janushi as Skerdi
- Elton Lomthi as Artan
- Hazir Hazir as Edon
- André Hennicke as the pharmacist

== Awards and competition ==
Within a short screening period, the film won several awards. The leading actor Nik Xhelilaj earned three Best Leading Actor awards in three different film festivals.

Awards won

- Filmfestival Max Ophüls Preis 2011
  - Best Film / Max-Ophüls-Preis
- Cinéma Tous Ecrans - Geneva international Film Festival 2010
  - Best Film "Reflet d'Or" (Ex aequo)
  - Public Award for Best long feature film
- 32nd Moscow International Film Festival
  - Special Jury Prize "Silver George"
  - Best Actor Prize "Silver George" for Nik Xhelilaj
- Bergen International Film Festival 2010
  - Special Jury Mention
- PriFilmFest - Prishtina International Film Festival 2010
  - Special Jury Award for the film
  - "Golden Goddess" Best Actor Award for Nik Xhelilaj
- 47th Antalya "Golden Orange" International Film Festival
  - Best Actor Award for Nik Xhelilaj in the International Feature Competition

The film has also competed in other film festivals such as the 45th Karlovy Vary International Film Festival, 15th Busan International Film Festival and 22nd Palm Springs International Film Festival.
