= Dua (film) =

2026 film by Blerta Basholli

- International promotional poster
- Directed by: Blerta Basholli
- Written by: Blerta Basholli; Nicole Borgeat
- Produced by: Valon Bajgora; Britta Rindelaub; Thomas Reichlin; Amaury Ovise
- Starring: Pinea Matoshi
- Cinematography: Lucie Baudinaud
- Edited by: Enis Saraçi
- Music by: Audrey Ismaël
- Production companies: Ikonë Studio; Alva Film; Kazak Productions
- Distributed by: Jour2Fête (France)
- Release date: 13 May 2026 (Cannes)
- Running time: 100 minutes
- Countries: Kosovo; Switzerland; France
- Languages: Albanian; Serbian

Dua is a 2026 coming-of-age war drama film directed by Blerta Basholli, co-written with Nicole Borgeat. A co-production of Kosovo, Switzerland, and France, it stars Pinea Matoshi in the titular role, a thirteen-year-old girl growing up in the late 1990s Pristina.

The film had its world premiere in the Critics' Week section of the 2026 Cannes Film Festival on 13 May, where it won the section's SACD Award. It was selected as the Kosovan entry for the Best International Feature Film at the 99th Academy Awards.

== Premise ==
Set in late 1990s Pristina, thirteen-year-old Dua struggles with the pressures of growing up amid rising ethnic tensions.

== Cast ==
- Pinea Matoshi as Dua
- Vlera Bilalli as Maki
- Kaona Matoshi as Tina
- Yllka Gashi as Zana
- Kushtrim Hoxha as Bekim
- Fiona Abdullahu as Mimi
- Mila Savic as Mrs. Tomic
- Andi Bajgora as Vegim
- Arben Bajraktaraj as Judo trainer

== Production ==
Dua is an international co-production of Kosovo, Switzerland, and France. In February 2025, the project received a €340,000 production grant from the Kosovo Film Center. In March 2025, it was reported that Arte France Cinéma would co-produce the film. In June 2025, the project received a €300,000 grant from the Eurimages.

Principal photography took place in October 2025 for 35 days around Pristina, Kosovo.

== Release ==
Dua had its world premiere at the Critics' Week section of the 2026 Cannes Film Festival on 13 May.

It has its Regional Premiere at the 32nd Sarajevo Film Festival, where it competes for Heart of Sarajevo award in the Competition Programme - Feature Film on 18 August 2026.

The film will compete at the 21st Rome Film Festival in 'Progressive Cinema Competition - Visions for the World of Tomorrow' in October 2026.

== Accolades ==
| Award | Date of ceremony | Category | Recipient(s) | Result | Ref. |
|---|---|---|---|---|---|
| Cannes Film Festival | 23 May 2026 | Grand Prix – Critics' Week | Dua | Nominated | |
| Cannes Film Festival | 23 May 2026 | Prix SACD – Critics' Week | Dua | Won | |
| Sarajevo Film Festival | 21 August 2026 | Heart of Sarajevo | Dua | Nominated | |

== See also ==
- Cinema of Kosovo
- List of submissions to the 99th Academy Awards for Best International Feature Film
- List of Kosovan submissions for the Academy Award for Best International Feature Film
