= Tjvjik (film) =

- Directed by: Arman Manaryan
- Written by: Yervand Manaryan
- Based on: Tjvjik by Atrpet
- Starring: Hrachia Nersisyan, Tsolak Amerikyan
- Music by: Eduard Baghdasaryan
- Production company: Armenfilm
- Release date: August 21, 1962 (Yerevan)
- Running time: 22 minutes
- Countries: Armenian SSR, Soviet Union
- Language: Armenian (Western dialect)

Tjvjik, Dzhvzhig, or Tzhvzhik (Armenian: Տժվժիկ [dʒvʒig], "Fried Liver") is a 1962 Soviet Armenian short film by Arman Manaryan. It is based on Atrpet's novel of the same name. Despite being Manaryan's first film and just 20 minutes-long, Tjvjik is considered one of the classics of the Armenian film history.

== Background ==
Arman Manaryan, the film's director was born in Iran in 1929. He migrated to Soviet Armenia in 1946. In 1952 he graduated from the Yerevan State Conservatory and in 1962 he graduated from the All-Union State Institute of Cinematography, the main cinematography school in the Soviet Union, where he studied under Grigori Roshal. At the time of his studies in Moscow he shot Tjvjik as his diploma work. Manaryan started to work at Armenfilm studio in 1962.

== Plot ==
The story is set in the city of Erzurum in Western Armenia, the Armenian-populated area of the Ottoman Empire at the end of the 19th century. Nerses Akhpar, a poor old man, goes to the local shop to buy food for his family. "In a close-knit community, food was one of the main topics of discussion. Everybody knew through the grapevine what was on each other's table for dinner. The status of town inhabitants was measured by the number of visits to the butcher shop, which was pretty much the center of the Armenian universe." Nikoghos Agha, who is the owner of the shop, gives him liver for free. Every time they meet, Nikoghos Agha reminds Nerses Akhpar about the liver he gave away. At the end of the story, Nerses buys the liver he owned and after finding Nikoghos Agha throws it into his face in the presence of several others screaming "Here is your tjvjik." The 2006 book Armenian Food: Facts, Fiction & Folklore jokingly concludes ""Charity exacerbated the resentment felt by the recipient", modern psychoanalysts would say."

== Cast ==
- Hrachia Nersisyan - Nerses Akhpar
- Tsolak Amerikyan - Nikoghos Agha
- Arman Kotikyan - Hovsep
- Khachig Sandaldjian - Old Man

== Significance, perception and impact ==
Tjvjik is primarily significant, because it is the first ever film in the Western Armenian language. Western Armenian was spoken by the Armenians in the Ottoman Empire and had come close to being extinct as a results of the Armenian genocide. The film reflects the "unassimilated" life of Armenians under Turkish rule in the 19th century. Several lines and expression from the film had become idioms in the Armenian colloquial. For example, the expression "don't make a story about tjvjik" (տժվժիկի պատմություն սարքել).

In 2006, DJ Serjo, one of the most notable Armenian house music producers, released his first album named Tjvjik.
