= List of Albanian documentary films =

This is a list of documentary films produced in Albania.

== List ==
- Shqipëria (1945)
- Kongresi i dytë i Bashkimit të Rinisë Antifashiste Shqiptare (1946)
- 1 Maj 1947 (1947)
- Komandanti viziton Shqipërinë e Mesme dhe të Jugut (1947)
- Qëndrimi i delegacionit shqiptar në Moskë (1947)
- Kongresi i parë i PKSH (1948)
- Në mbrojtje të paqes dhe lumturisë së popujve. Parada e 10 korrikut. (1948)
- Për mirëqënien e jetës së popullit tonë (1948)
- Shqipëria e re (1948)
- Vizita e delegacionit qeveritar shqiptar në Bullgari (1948)
- Festivali Folkloristik 1949 (1949)
- Hekurudha Durrës-Tiranë (1949)
- Kongresi i Unifikimit të Rinisë (1949)
- Qëndrimi i delegacionit qeveritar shqiptar në Moskë (1949)
- Festa e çlirimit të Shqipërisë (1950)
- Miqësi e pathyeshme (1951)
- Për paktin e paqes (1951)
- Shatërvani i Bahçisarajt (1951)
- Festivali Folkloristik 1952 (1952)
- Kongresi i dytë i PPSH (1952)
- Rrugë e lavdishme (1952)
- Shqipëria (1952)
- Takim i përzemërt (1952)
- Betimit i popullit shqiptar para Stalinit të madh (1953)
- Festa e ushtrisë popullore (1953)
- 10 Vjetori i lavdishëm (1954)
- E kaluara nuk kthehet më (1954)
- Miq të dashur (1954)
- Mysafirë nga Shqipëria (1954)
- Letër nga fshati (1955)
- Në festivalin e Varshavës (1955)
- Pushime të gëzuara! (1955)
- Urime shokë studentë! (1955)
- Zëri i popullit shqiptar (1955)
- Alpinistët në Korab (1956)
- Cërriku (1956)
- Delegacioni ynë qeveritar në RP të Mongolisë (1956)
- Kino koncert i këngëve dhe valleve (1956)
- Kongresi i partisë sonë (1956)
- Luftëtarë të 5 vjeçarit (1956)
- Mysafirë të shtrenjtë (1956)
- Nëntori ynë (1956)
- Nga punimet e Kongresit të XX të PK të BS (1956)
- Përgatitja rreshtore (1956)
- Pranvera e nëntë (1956)
- Riatdhesimi i ushtarëve grekë të strehuar në Shqipëri (1956)
- Shprehje e miqësisë së pathyeshme (1956)
- Si bëhen votimet (1956)

== See also ==
- Albanian National Center of Cinematography
- Albanian Central Film Archive
- Cinema of Kosovo
