= Ivan Shvedoff =

Russian actor (born 1969)

- Иван Шведов
- Born: 21 September 1969 (age 55); Leningrad, Russian SFSR, Soviet Union (now Saint Petersburg, Russia)
- Occupation: Actor
- Years active: 1992–present
- Website: http://www.shvedoff.com/

Ivan Shvedoff (Russian: Иван Шведов; born 21 September 1969) is a Russian actor.

== Biography ==
Shvedoff was born in Leningrad (now Saint Petersburg) in the Russian SFSR.

Shvedoff first started his acting career as a theater actor in the Theater of Youth Creativity (1979-1986).

He studied acting at the Saint Petersburg State Theatre Arts Academy from 1987 to 1991, and made his film debut in The Chekist in 1992. Shvedoff has lived in Prague since the late 1990s.

He has appeared in several Hollywood films usually as Russian or Eastern Bloc characters, including Enemy at the Gates, The Bourne Supremacy and Mission: Impossible – Ghost Protocol. He was also a Russian dialog coach for Matt Damon in The Bourne Identity.

== Filmography ==
Year	Title	Role	Notes
1992	The Chekist		
1992	Rin		
1993	Gadael Lenin	Sasha	
1994	Frantsuzskiy vals	Boleslav	
1995	Pribytie poezda		(segment "Exercise No.5")
1996	The Successor	Salesperson	
2000	England!	Valeri Sikorski	
2001	Enemy at the Gates	Volodya	
2003	Distant Lights	Kolya	
2003	Čert ví proč	Kvido	
2003	Zuckerbrot	Mitja	
2004	Love in Thoughts	Gast im Moka Efti	
2004	Traffic Affairs	Sylvester	
2004	Das Apfelbaumhaus	Arkady	
2004	The Bourne Supremacy	Moscow Policeman	
2005	Almost Heaven	Strike	
2007	Almaz Black Box	Ivan Romanenko	
2007	Prostye veshchi	Vasin	
2007	The Calling Game	Irms Kollege Peter	
2009	The Bone Man	Igor	
2010	Mamas & Papas		
2010	The Albanian	Slatko	
2010	We Are the Night	van Gogh	
2011	4 Days in May	Trubizin	
2011	Mission: Impossible – Ghost Protocol	Leonid Lisenker	
2014	A Hitman's Solitude Before the Shot	Jassen	
2014	Winterkartoffelknödel	Skender Gashi	
2014	Alles ist Liebe	Finnischer LKW-Fahrer	
2015	Fremdkörper	Pjotr	
2015	Child 44	Artur's Father	
2015	Abschussfahrt	Detective Stanek	
2015	Buddha's Little Finger	Shurick	
2015	Bridge of Spies	2nd Soviet Interrogator	
2016	Fly Away Home	Feldwebel	
2016	Siblings	Stephan	
2016	Stefan Zweig: Farewell to Europe	Halpern Leivick	
2017	Babylon Berlin	Alexej Kardakow	9 episodes
2019	The Aftermath	Colonel Kutov	
