= Arnavut ciğeri =

Turkish liver dish

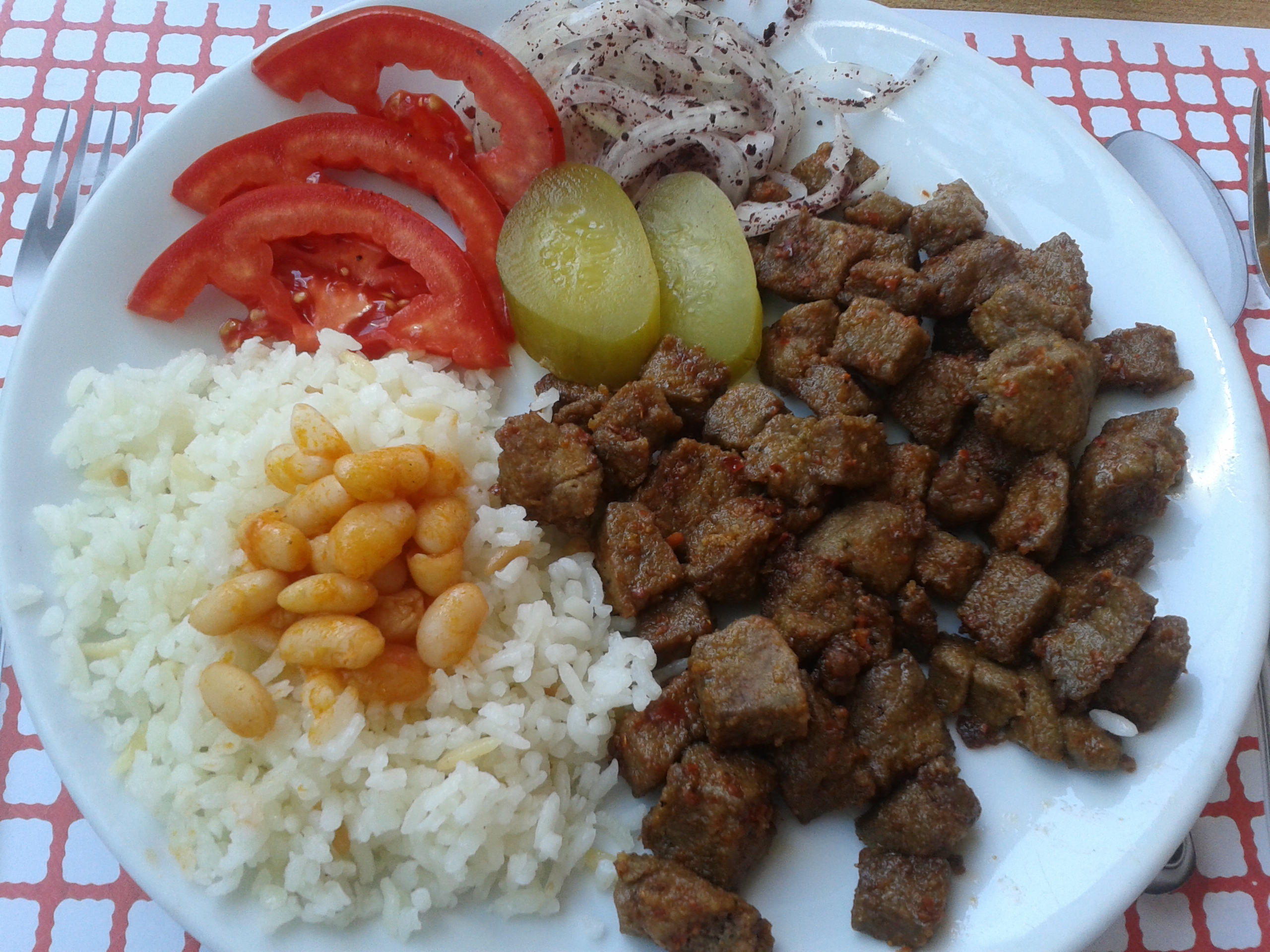
- Place of origin: Turkey
- Region or state: Istanbul
- Main ingredients: lamb or veal liver, oil, hot pepper, onion, parsley

Arnavut ciğeri (literally "Albanian liver") is a Turkish dish made of oil-fried lamb or veal liver cubes seasoned with hot pepper, served traditionally with onion and parsley.

== Etymology ==
The word Arnavut (Albanian) is part of a dish in Istanbul cuisine known as Arnavut ciğeri (Albanian liver).

== History ==
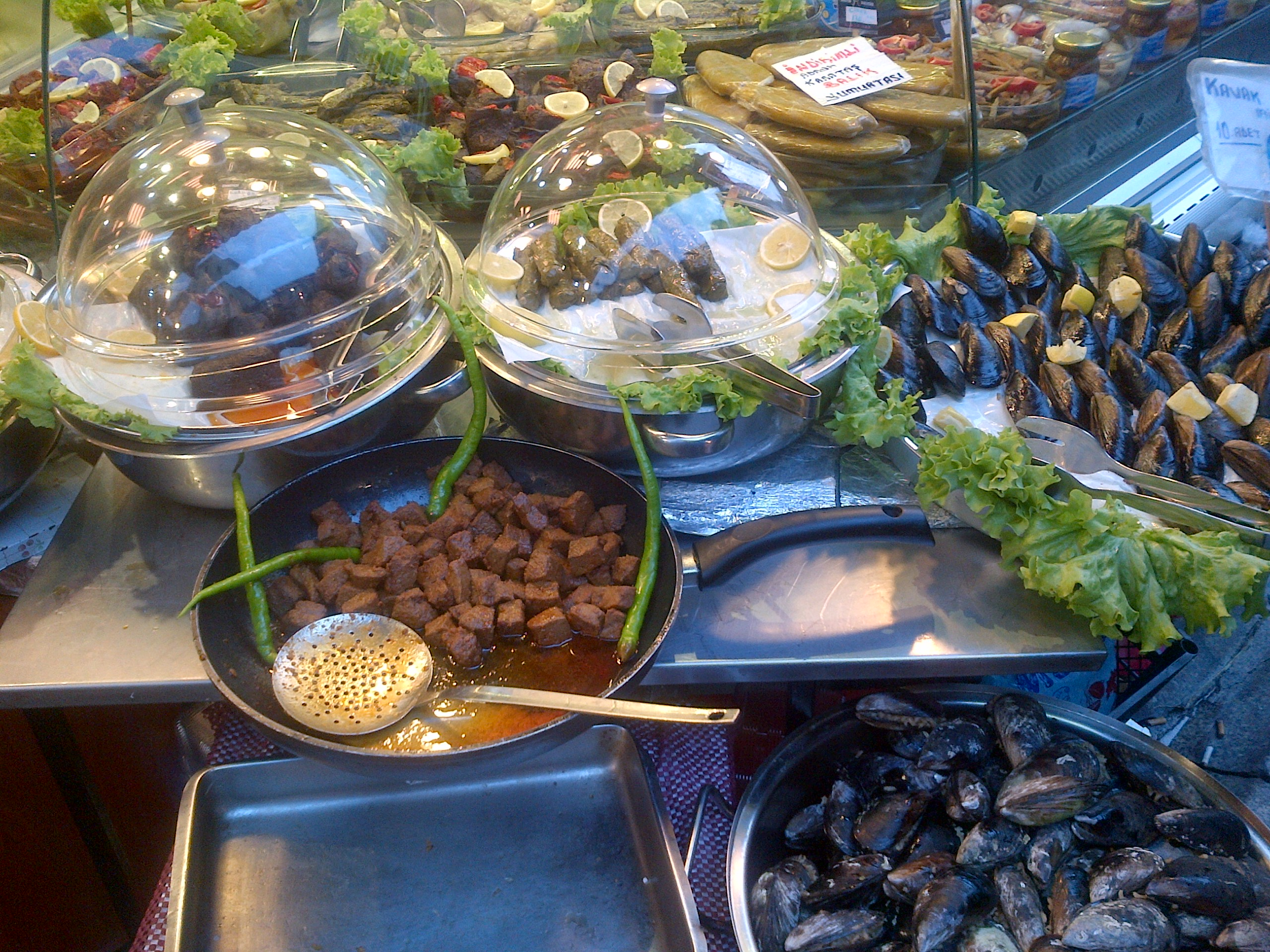
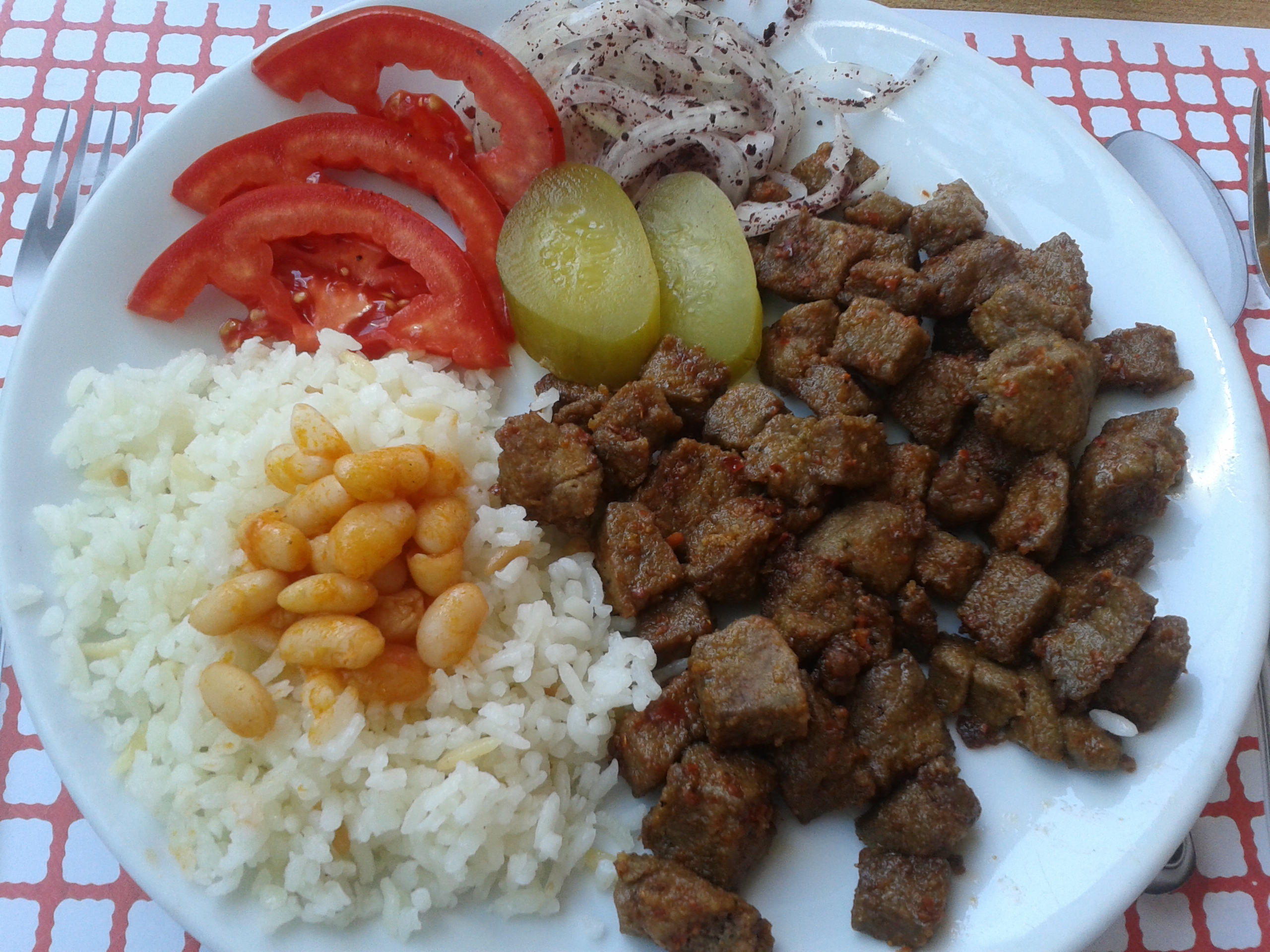
Arnavut ciğeri sold at a food stall (left) and as part of a meze platter (right)

The origins of Arnavut ciğeri lie in the fifteenth century and the aftermath of wars in what became the Ottoman Balkans (Rumelia) and the immigration of Albanians to the Istanbul region. People traveling from the Balkans to Ottoman Anatolia imparted their influences on the area such as Albanians who became employed as mobile sellers of raw liver. In the late 17th century, Albanians were noted by Ottoman traveler Evliya Çelebi as being butchers in Istanbul originating from Ohrid, Korçë and Hurupişte (modern Argos Orestiko) selling lamb meat cuts like liver, heart and kidneys. The dish Arnavut ciğeri became part of Turkish cuisine during the Ottoman period, when Ottomans assimilated culinary traditions from peoples they encountered and merged them with their own cuisine, cooking practices and customs.

== See also ==
- Kokoreç
- Ottoman cuisine
- Albanian cuisine
- Albanians in Turkey
- List of Turkish dishes
- Tjvjik
- Jerusalem mixed grill
