= Arman Manaryan =

Armenian film director

- Born: December 15, 1929; Arak, Iran
- Died: February 16, 2016 (aged 86)
- Occupation: Film director

Arman Manaryan (Armenian: Արման Մանարյան; December 15, 1929 – February 16, 2016) was an Iranian-born Armenian film director.

== Biography ==
He was the brother of actor Yervand Manaryan. He repatriated to Soviet Armenia in 1946 and graduated from the Yerevan State Conservatory in 1952 and from the Moscow Institute of Cinematography in 1962. Since then he worked with Armenfilm. He died in 2016, aged 86.

== Films ==
- Tjvjik (1962)
- Morgan's Relative (1970)
