= Arta Muçaj =

Albanian actress (born 1975)

- Born: 24 December 1975 (age 50); Prizren, SFR Yugoslavia
- Education: Academy of Arts, Albania
- Occupation: Actress
- Website: www.artamucaj.com

Arta Muçaj (born 24 December 1975) is an Albanian-born Australian actress, best known for her role as the villain Didi, a vulgar, mafia and drug addict woman in the drama-thriller series Njerëz dhe Fate and its sequel film Njerëz dhe Fate 3.

== Biography ==
Arta Muçaj studied drama at the Academy of Arts in Tirana, Albania, gaining a Bachelor of Arts in acting. She has performed at many national and international Theatre Festivals in Europe and elsewhere, including the Vienna Festival, Bonner Biennale 2000, Festival D'Avignon, Intercult, Bologna 2000, The Summer Ohrid Festival, Macedonia, The Festival of Budva, Montenegro, International Theatre Festival in Istanbul and International Theatre Festival in Cairo. She received Awards for Best Leading Actress for her role in The Father of A.Strindberg, for the National Theatre Festival of Macedonia and the International Theatre Festival of Kosovo. She has performed in several plays in Kosovo.

== Theatre ==
- "The Liar" by K. Goldon, as Rosaura. Directed by Ervin Culi for The National Theatre of Tirana.
- "Danton's Death" by G. Byhner, as Lucile. Directed by Vladimir Milcin for The National Theatre of Tirana.
- "Summer Day" by S. Mrozhek, as Dame. Directed by Bojken Lako for The National Theatre of Tirana.
- "Quo Vadis" by Serafin Fanko, as Bride. Directed by Serafin Fanko for The National Theatre of Tirana.
- "Watch Out It Bites!" by A. Bern, as Kate. Directed by Kico Londo for The National Theatre of Tirana.
- "Hotel Europa" by Goran Stefanovski, as Visitor. Directed by Dritero Kasapi for Intercult.
- "One Flew Over the Cuckoo's Nest" by Dale Wasserman, as Nurse Ratched. Directed by Ilir Bokshi for The National Theatre of Kosovo.
- "Tomorrow Paradise" by Teki Dervishi, as Bride. Directed by Dritero Kasapi for Intercult.
- "Faust III" by P. Valeri, as Mephisto. Directed by Jeton Budima for The National Theatre of Kosovo.
- "Death and the Maiden" by A. Dorfman, as Paulina. Directed by Rikard Larja for The National Theatre of Kosovo.
- "Dervish and the Death" by Meša Selimović, as Kady's Wife. Directed by Vladimir Milcin for Theatre of Nationalities.
- "The Father" by August Strindberg, as Laura. Directed by Slobodan Unkovski for Theatre of Nationalities.
- "Black Box" by S. Hamiti, as Isabela. Directed by Agim Sopi for The National Theatre of Kosovo.
- "Roberto Zuko" by Bernard-Marie Koltès, as Lady of the Park. Directed by Vladimir Milcin for The National Theatre of Kosovo.
- "The House of Bernarda Alba" by Federico Garcia Lorca, as Angustia. Directed by Bekim Lumi for The National Theatre of Kosovo.
- "The Hannibal of Underground" by Hristo Boichev, as Cleopatra. Directed by Kushtrim Koliqi for The National Theatre of Kosovo.
- "Pass the Butler" by Eric Idle, as Lady Rebecca Charles. Directed by Ilir Bokshi for The National Theatre of Kosovo.
- "Courage to Kill" by Lars Noren, as Radka. Directed by Arta Kallaba for Independent Theatre.
- "The Rebels of Edna Mazya" as Alma. Directed by Bujar Luma for The National Theatre of Kosovo.
- "Helen Back" by Elena Carapetis, as Woman 2. Directed by Gertraud Ingeborg & David Ritchie for Harlos Productions.
- "Heart Thy Neighbour" by Camilla Maxwell, as Sarina. Directed by Louise Howlett for ReAction Theatre.
- "Shakespeare & the Dark Lady of the Sonnets" by Enzo Condello, as Emilia Bassano. Directed by Christopher Hosking for Globe Productions.

== Films ==
- "Vjeshta e Trëndafilave" (The Autumn of Roses) by Veli Karahoda as Tina. Directed by Agim Sopi for AS Production.
- "Anathema" by Agim Sopi as Doresa. Directed by Agim Sopi for the Cinematographic Centre of Kosovo.
- "Donkeys of the Border" as Bukuria. Directed by Jeton Ahmetaj for the Cinematographic Centre of Kosovo.
- "Home Sweet Home" as Hana. Directed by Faton Bajraktari for the Cinematographic Centre of Kosovo.
- "Troubled Skies" as Venera. Directed by Anton Nrecaj for the Cinematographic Centre of Kosovo.

== Television ==
- "Njerez dhe Fate" (People and Destinies) as Didi by Ruzhdi Pulaha. Directed by Ylli Pepo for Albanian National Television.
- "Inside Justice" as Zana Rexhaj. Directed by Ilir Bokshi for the National Television of Kosovo and USAID.
- "Rrushe" as Inspector Temaj. Directed by Valter Lucaj.

== Short film ==
- "Degree of Separation" as Virianna. Directed by Kyahl Anderson for The Cloud Foundry.

== Awards ==
- Hana, "Home Sweet Home"
  - Awarded Best Actress, New York Albanian Film Week
- Radka in "Courage to Kill"
  - Awarded Best Female Actor, National Theatre Festival of Kosovo
- Laura in "The Father"
  - Awarded Best Female Actor, International Theatre Festival, Kosova Infest
  - Awarded Best Female Actor, National Theatre Festival of Macedonia
  - Awarded Best Female Actor, National Theatre Festival of Kosovo
- Bukuria in "Donkeys of the Border"
  - Awarded Best Female Actor, National Film Festival, Kosovo
