= Alban Ukaj =

Bosnian-Kosovo actor

Alban Ukaj (born in Pristina, 21 July 1980) is a Bosnian and Kosovo actor. He attended the Academy of Performing Arts in Sarajevo, Bosnia and Herzegovina. He is notable for his role in the film Lorna's Silence (2008) and his lead role in the Greek film J.A.C.E (2011).

Ukaj appeared in the comedy drama Fuse (2003), the romantic drama The Marriage (2017), and the critically acclaimed war drama Quo Vadis, Aida? (2020) as well. He is also known for his performances as a stage actor in Kosovo, Albania, Bosnia and Herzegovina, and Serbia.

== Personal life ==
Ukaj married Bosnian politician Sabina Ćudić at New York City Hall in New York on 10 April 2014. Their child, a boy named Nardis, was born in August 2015.

== Selected filmography ==
=== Film ===
Year	Title	Role	Notes
2003	Fuse	Glavar	
2008	Lorna's Silence	Sokol	
2011	J.A.C.E	Jace	
2017	The Marriage	Bekim	
2020	Quo Vadis, Aida?	Tarik	
2024	The Tower of Strength	Sokol Gjonaj	Montenegrin entry for the Best International Feature Film at the 2026 Oscars
2025	The Pavilion		It will open 31st Sarajevo Film Festival
