= The Marriage (2017 film) =

2017 Kosovan film

- Film poster
- Directed by: Blerta Zeqiri
- Written by: Blerta Zeqiri; Kreshnik Berisha - Keka
- Produced by: Kreshnik Berisha - Keka
- Starring: Alban Ukaj
- Cinematography: Sevdije Kastrati
- Edited by: Kreshnik Berisha - Keka
- Release date: 28 November 2017 (PÖFF)
- Running time: 97 minutes
- Country: Kosovo
- Language: Albanian

The Marriage (Albanian: Martesa) is a 2017 Kosovan romantic drama film directed by Blerta Zeqiri. It was selected as the Kosovan entry for the Best Foreign Language Film at the 91st Academy Awards, but it was not nominated.

== Plot ==
In the lead-up to Bekim and Anita's wedding, Bekim's friend and former gay lover, Nol, returns from abroad.

== Cast ==
- Alban Ukaj as Bekim
- Adriana Matoshi as Anita
- Genc Salihu as Nol

== Reception ==
On Rotten Tomatoes, it has a 75% score based on 8 critics, with an average rating of 8/10.

== See also ==
- List of submissions to the 91st Academy Awards for Best Foreign Language Film
- List of Kosovan submissions for the Academy Award for Best Foreign Language Film
