= Albanians in Turkey =

Ethnic group in the Republic of Turkey

Albanians in Turkey Türkiye'deki Arnavutlar
Shqiptarët në Turqi
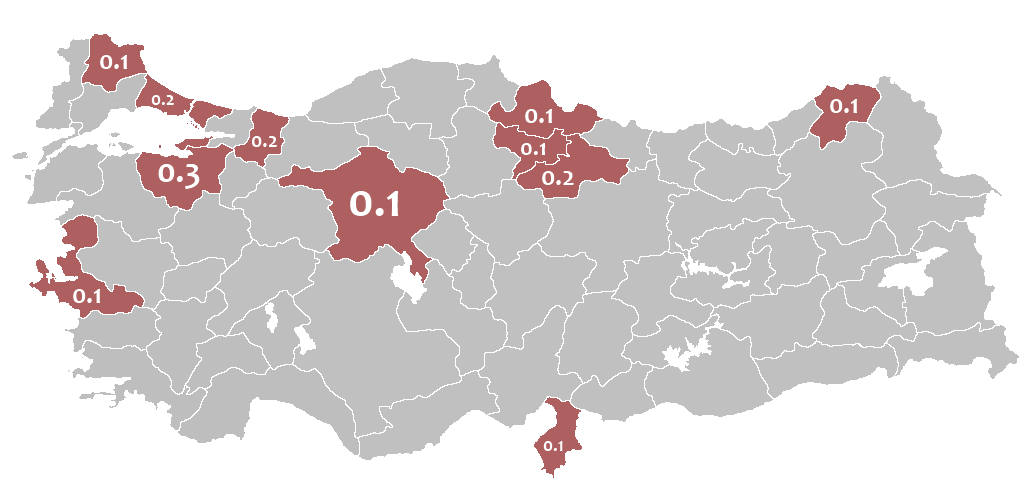
- Distribution of Albanian speakers in Turkey according to mother tongue, Turkish census 1965

Total population
- Turkey 500,000 - 6,000,000

Regions with significant populations
- Amasya Province, Ankara Province, Artvin Province, Bursa Province (Marmara region), Hatay Province, Istanbul Province, İzmir Province, Aydın Province, Kırklareli Province, Sakarya Province, Samsun Province and Tokat Province

Languages
- Turkish, Albanian

Religion
- Islam (Sunni · Bektashi)

Related ethnic groups
- Albanian diaspora

Albanians in Turkey (Albanian: Shqiptarët në Turqi; Turkish: Türkiye'deki Arnavutlar) are ethnic Albanian citizens and denizens of Turkey. They consist of Albanians who arrived during the Ottoman period beginning in the 16th century.

A 2008 report from the Turkish National Security Council (MGK) estimated that approximately 1.3 million people of Albanian ancestry live in Turkey, and more than 500,000 recognizing their ancestry, language and culture. There are other estimates however that place the number of people in Turkey with Albanian ancestry and background upward to 5 or 6 million.

== History ==
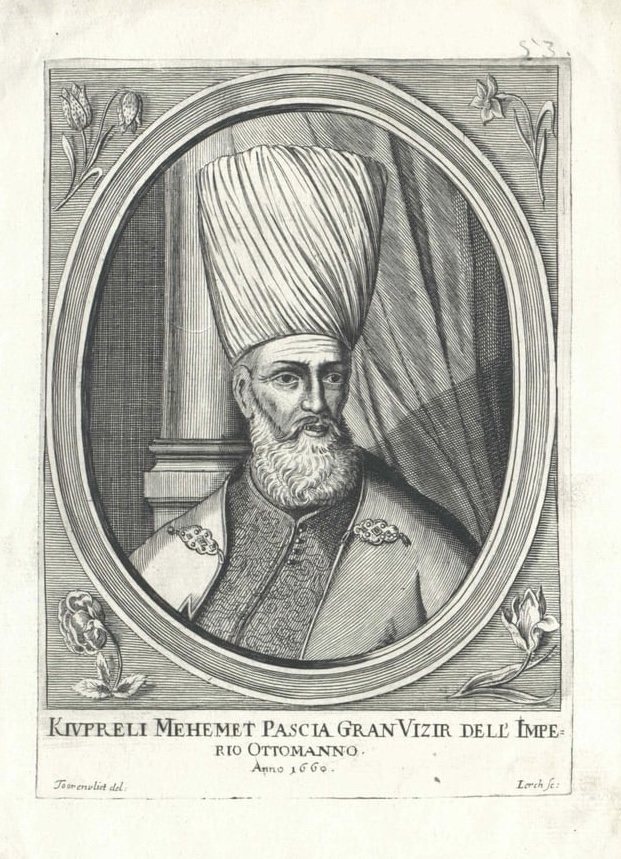
Köprülü Mehmed Pasha, Grand Vizier of the Ottoman Empire (mid 17th century) and founder of powerful political Köprülü family dynasty

The Ottoman period that followed in Albania after the end of Skanderbeg's resistance was characterized by a great change. Many Albanians gained prominent positions in the Ottoman government such as: Iljaz Hoxha, Hamza Kastrioti, Koca Davud Pasha, Zağanos Pasha, Köprülü Mehmed Pasha (head of the Köprülü family of Grand Viziers), the Bushati family, Sulejman Pasha, Edhem Pasha, Nezim Frakulla, Haxhi Shekreti, Hasan Zyko Kamberi, Ali Pasha of Gucia, Muhammad Ali of Egypt and Ali Pasha of Tepelena who rose to become one of the most powerful Albanian Muslim rulers in western Rumelia. As such, there has been a considerable presence of Albanians in parts of the former Ottoman Empire in areas such as Anatolia due to the Ottoman administration and military.

=== Migration and formation of the Albanian diaspora in Turkey ===
==== First Phase: Labour and other migration (16th – early 20th centuries) ====
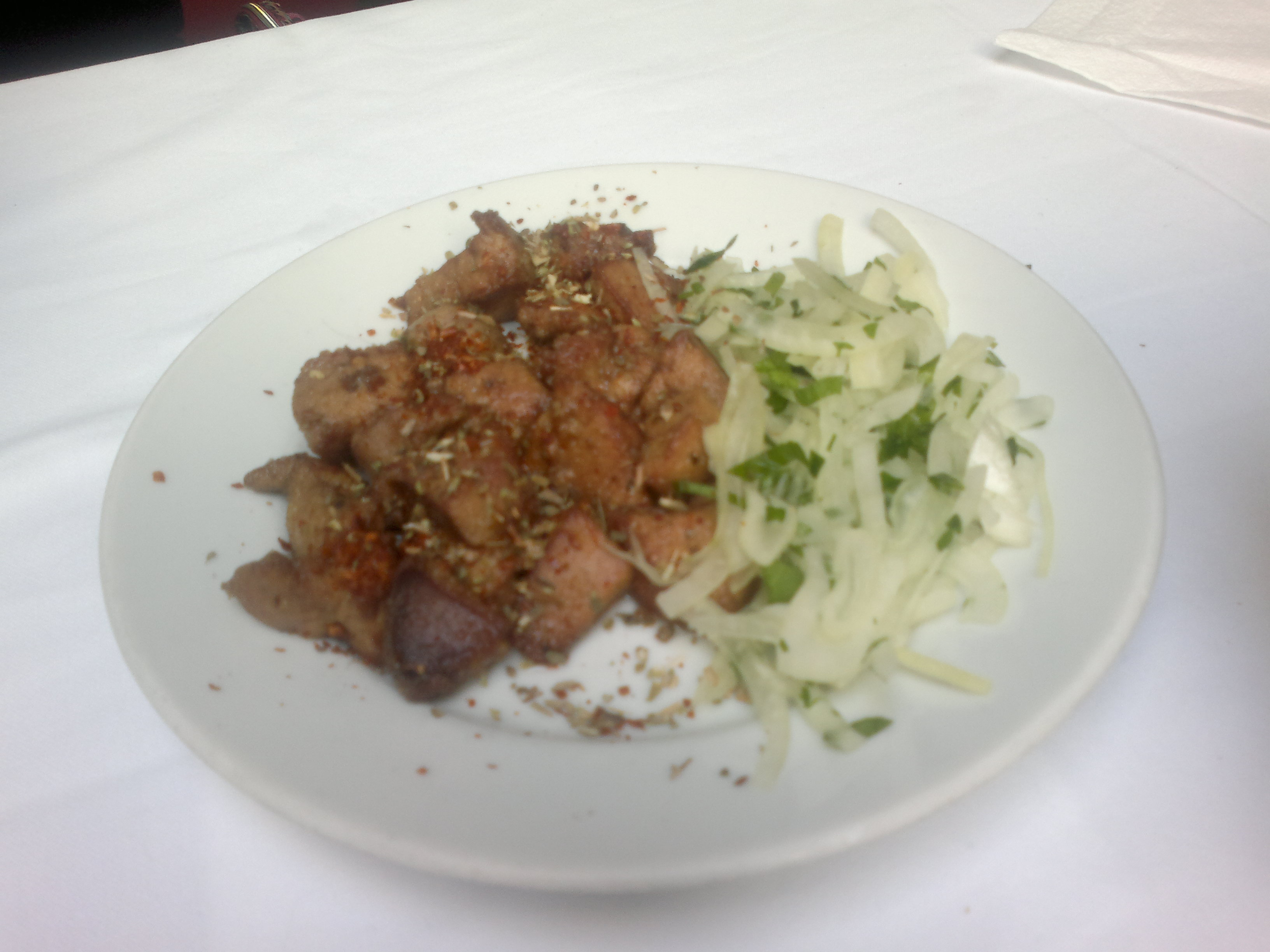
Arnavut ciğeri (Albanian liver), Istanbul Turkish liver dish that emerged from Albanian butchers working in Anatolia over the centuries

The Albanian diaspora in Turkey was formed during the Ottoman era and early years of the Turkish republic through migration for economic reasons and later sociopolitical circumstances of discrimination and violence experienced by Albanians in Balkan countries. One of the earliest concentrations of Albanians date to 1468 when Sultan Mehmed the Conqueror brought Albanians and installed them in the districts of Istanbul where they founded Arnavutköy, a place named after them meaning Albanian village.

Albanian migration to Turkey occurred during three distinctive phases. The first was during the Ottoman era when Albanians served as Ottoman bureaucrats, seasonal employees or in the military drawn to Istanbul, the then capital and the nearby area of the Marmara region. These Albanian migrations to northwestern Anatolia mainly began from the 16th century onward. Members of the Albanian community from this group have for the most part assimilated into Turkish society, with small numbers regarding themselves as Albanians.

Albanians also undertook labour migration alongside other Balkan peoples to Anatolia that resulted in seasonal or permanent settlement. At times these Albanians were unemployed in Istanbul and often lived in near each other causing concern for Ottoman authorities that a large group of unemployed people having potential to cause social upheaval. Due to the sociopolitical crisis of the 18th century, Ottoman elites developed views of low-class Albanians being prone to banditry and crime alongside other vices and those views being reflected in Turkish popular culture of the shadow puppet Karagöz plays. Several Ottoman Sultans issued decrees forbidding Albanian migration to Istanbul resulting at times in Ottoman authorities breaking up clusters of Albanians in the city and deporting others back to their homeland, actions later undertaken in the Marmara region. An Albanian community in Istanbul and to a lesser extent in İzmir played a significant role through the emerging Albanian intelligentsia of the late 19th and early 20th century in shaping and generating Albanian nationalist aspirations. For example, the group Bashkimi (Union) opened offices in Istanbul and throughout Anatolia and the Balkans in various urban centres promoting Albanian sociopolitical rights, the development of Albanian language education, publishing and literature.

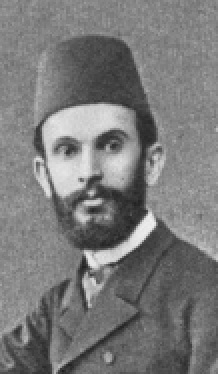
Sami Frashëri, Ottoman-Albanian intellectual

There were also some people coming from a Balkan Albanian speaking or cultural space and often belonging to the urban elite (şehirli) in Kosovo and Macedonia that migrated to Anatolia did not always identify with a concept of Albanianess. Instead during the 19th and early 20th centuries they adopted an Ottoman Turkish outlook and came to refer to themselves as Turks or Ottoman Turkish-speaking citizens. Due to the effects of socio-linguistic assimilation, promoters of Albanian nationalism became concerned about migration to Anatolia and degraded Albanians from the lower classes who undertook the journey. It is unknown if or to what degree descendants in contemporary times from this group have fluency or knowledge of the Albanian language. The effects of Albanian migration has influenced Turkish culture such as toponyms named after Albanians, in cuisine the dish Arnavut ciğeri (Albanian liver) and character traits Arnavut inadı (Albanian stubbornness).

==== Second Phase: Wars and forced population movements (1878–1944) ====
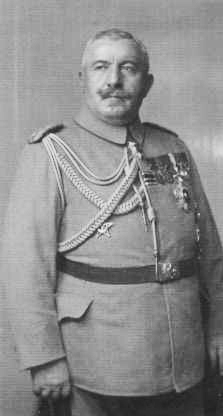
Ahmed Izzet Pasha, Ottoman Grand Vizier, Minister of Foreign Affairs and General, participant in Turkish War of Independence

The second phase was during the late 19th and early 20th centuries when Albanians mainly fled persecution and became refugees as the Ottoman Empire was disintegrating due to conflict. Albanians were expelled by the Serb army and fled from the Sanjak of Niş in 1878, settling in the Samsun region. The Balkan Wars (1912-1913) fought by Greece, Serbia, Montenegro and Bulgaria against the Ottoman Empire expanded the Albanian diaspora. Large numbers of Muslim refugees arrived in Istanbul and Anatolia overwhelming the abilities and resources of Ottoman authorities to provide food, shelter, personal registration and documentation. Descendants from these Albanians form the largest portion of the Albanian community in Turkey.

Ottoman authorities aware of the demographics of Kosovo and Macedonia understood that a large portion of the unregistered refugees migrating toward Eastern Thrace and Anatolia were Albanian and many of them had congregated in urban centres like Karacabey, Edremit, Değirmendere, Karamürsel, Kirmasti and Bursa. The capture of Debar by Serbia made many of its Albanian inhabitants flee to Istanbul. The new Young Turk (CUP) government of the Ottoman Empire sought to restructure the demographic situation during the First World War around the wider Marmara region.

At the onset of the war, Albanian migration to Anatolia continued toward districts (Istanbul, Edirne, Hüdavendigâr) and counties (Çatalca, Kale-i-Sultaniye, İzmit and Gelibolu) made forbidden by authorities to Albanians, due to large numbers already present and the geostrategic importance of the area. The Young Turk government viewed Albanians as prone to banditry and violence when congregated and sought to undermine threats to the state through dispersal. The Young Turk government also was distrustful of Albanians after they had declared independence from the Ottoman Empire, especially Christian Albanians who were involved in that process and they were banned from coming into the country. New destinations by the Ottoman government were intended for Albanian migrants toward Ankara, Konya with resettlement in Sivas, Diyarbakır, Elazığ, Kayseri, Adana and other places while those measures were also applied to settled Albanians in the Marmara region with few exceptions.

Albanians were one of many Muslim peoples in the empire set for resettlement throughout Anatolia to generate conditions for linguistic and cultural assimilation with the aim of creating loyal Muslim Turkish speaking citizens. Ottoman government officials applied the policy in some regions and avoided it in other places understanding the sociopolitical importance of Albanians in an area as some of the decision making authorities hailed from a Balkan Albanian linguistic or cultural space. Some Albanian migrants resisted those government moves for resettlement.

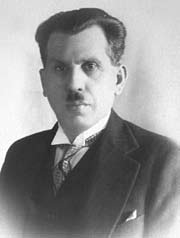
Kâzım Özalp, military officer, later General; politician, and a leading figure in the Turkish War of Independence

After Albanian independence, the Albanian elite from Shkodër, Tirana and Kosovo had the option of working for the Republic of Albania while those Albanian elites from Greek and Serbian Macedonia had no home or government in need of them or familial, business or other Balkan networks to draw upon and moved to Anatolia. The Albanian community consisting of a large number of refugees was geographically fragmented between 1914-1918 and were not much integrated into Ottoman paramilitary formations based on the Eastern Front, unlike other more established communities like the Circassians. Albanians were seen as possible recruits for those structures and some Albanians from the Ottoman elite who had previous affiliations to the CUP in the Balkans or joined later in Anatolia, worked to recruit Albanians.

At the end of the First World War, Albanians of the Bursa and Kirmasti regions in paramilitary formations had sided with the Turkish Nationalists. Albanian armed groups fought against Laz and Georgian paramilitaries due to local interests and familial rivalries in the South Marmara region while Albanian paramilitaries attacked Christian villages and Ottoman officials had minimal to no control of the wider area. Fighting also occurred between Albanian and Circassian paramilitaries of whom the latter sacked and plundered Albanian properties in the Marmara region. Some Circassian paramilitaries focusing on provincial issues cooperated with incoming Greek military forces in 1920 during the Turkish War of Independence and Albanian paramilitaries fought against them. Albanian paramilitaries were also active in the Bafra region. Little attention was placed by the older Istanbul Albanian diaspora toward the plight of Albanians recently arrived in Anatolia. Instead they were indifferent to the occupation of Ottoman Anatolian lands and mainly interested in Balkan Albanian affairs, in relation to Yugoslav encroachment of Albanian sovereignty in the early 1920s.

The Turkish republic was established in 1923 and Albanian immigration continued unabated through Thrace and Turkey found it difficult to resettle Albanian refugees in state assigned areas or to stop them going to regions that were classed as forbidden. The Turkish government instead preferred Turks and other Muslims from the Balkans and the National Assembly forbid Albanians with Serbian and Yugoslav passports from entering Turkey. The Turkish republic reserved a right to remove, disperse and resettle Albanians to parts of Turkey it desired. Unlike the previous Young Turk government, Albanians were no longer forbidden by new republican authorities to settle in the South Marmara region, as the capital Istanbul was transferred to Ankara and the region lost its strategic importance. By allowing freedom of movement for the Albanian community, Turkey sought to integrate those Albanians already present into Turkish society. Local Turkish administration authorities differed toward their views in resettling Albanians with some like provinces of Antalya, Kocaeli and Çatalca refusing assistance, while others such as Iğdır and Adana expressed a willingness to accept Albanian refugees. Albanian communities in many areas were newly established such as those in Çatalca, Niğde, Kirkkilise, Kastamonu and Osmaniye made up mainly of Albanian refugees from Kosovo and Macedonia with some working as merchants, government employees while some others engaged in banditry.

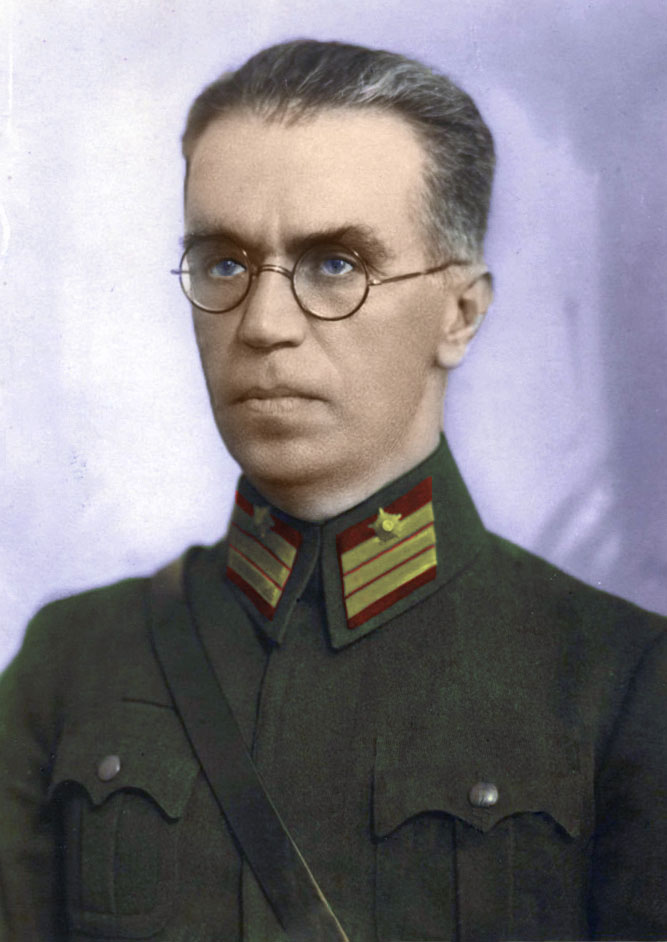
Hayrullah Fişek, career officer in the Turkish army and Undersecretary for the Ministry of National Defence

Some Turkish administration officials in official correspondences under reported Albanian numbers of both long established communities and newer arrivals living in parts of Turkey. Other Turkish authorities noted that Albanian communities had become dense living in many Turkish villages, towns, neighbourhoods and often comprising at least 10 percent of the population. The region of İzmir had the most Albanians made up of a long established population, some that were displaced by Greek military forces during the war and newer arrivals squatting on abandoned Greek properties of which some were relocated to the Anatolian interior around Isparta and Niğde and given former Armenian property. In Istanbul Turkish authorities compiled lists of names and other family details of which Albanians, mainly from Kosovo and Macedonia were to remain and others to be relocated in Anatolia. Albanians from the Istanbul area had a preference to be resettled in the region of İzmir.

Turkish officials generated a large corpus of correspondences and administrative documents that contained details about Albanian refugees and immigrants regarding their location, numbers and percentage of the population and where they could be relocated. Other administrative documents refer to Turkish officials losing track of other Albanians who were unregistered or unaccounted for during the period of war. Integrated Albanians who were employed as state civil servants, merchants, landowners, tradesmen, officials and officers featured little in Turkish state documentation and attention was toward Albanian refugees and the poor viewed as populations who could threaten the state. Continued Albanian immigration was viewed negatively by the Turkish government as Albanians in immigration law (1926) were placed within the third tier alongside Arabs, Kurds and Romani populations, viewed as subversive and undesirable that were forbidden to be naturalised.

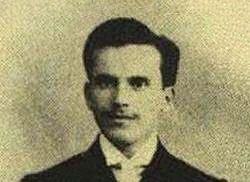
Ali Sami Yen, founder of Galatasaray football club

Albania pursued developing and furthering interstate relations with Turkey of which were considerations and concerns toward safeguarding the interests of the large Albanian population in Turkey who were experiencing economic and political problems. Within the context of Albanian-Turkish bilateral relations, both countries signed the Citizenship Agreement (1923) that contained provisions for safeguarding property and citizenship rights of Turkish citizens in Albania and of Albanian nationals in Turkey while due to the Lausanne Treaty Ankara did not uphold those protocols in relation to Christian Albanians.

In 1923 the Treaty of Lausanne formalised a Greco-Turkish population exchange which was done according to religious affiliation and not based on linguistic or other differences. High ranking Turkish officials such as Rıza Nur, a close associate of Mustafa Kemal Atatürk had negative views of Albanians and pressed for their exclusion from the population exchange to Turkey of which Greece agreed. Greek representatives noted that Albanians were confined only to Chameria and had promised Turkish officials that only Turkish speakers from Epirus and other regions from Greece would be sent. Thousands of Albanians from Chameria arrived in Turkey alongside others from Preveza, Ioannina and Florina that resettled around Bursa and the wider South Marmara region and were part of the Turkish effort to rebuild settlements destroyed during the war. Albania tried and failed to convince Ankara to omit Orthodox Albanians who were regarded as Greeks from the population exchange with Greece and to safeguard their property and assets in Turkey. Turkey claimed that conventions in the Lausanne treaty defined automatically all Orthodox people as Greeks and could not be undone for individual groups or cases.

Tirana was also concerned about the forced removal of Muslim Albanians during the population exchange with Greece who had arrived to Turkey and were living in difficult economic circumstances to be permitted migration to Albania if they so wished. Granted that right for Albanians from Chameria, the arrangement also covered Albanians arriving from Yugoslavia to Turkey the option of migrating to Albania. For example, some Albanians that fled from Debar to Turkey migrated to Albania and its capital city Tirana where they became an important segment of the urban population during the 1920s. Turkish officials such as Nur expressed their displeasure that Albanians had arrived as Turks contravening the exchange agreement and that they were resettled in areas such as Kartal, Pendik and Erenköy, west of İzmit considered to be high quality lands and in Ankara. Albanians descended from people arriving during the population exchange still inhabit the areas of Erenköy and Kartal in Istanbul, as well as a number of towns in the area of Bursa, especially Mudanya. Albanians from villages on the Greek side of the border opposite the Albanian Devoll region and villages from the Kastoria region arrived to Turkey during the population exchange.

Riza Nur placed blame on Abdülhalik Renda, an Albanian native of Ioannina and close associate of Atatürk who served as İzmir governor during the period of encouraging Albanians to resettle from other Anatolian regions to İzmir. Official Turkish government reports of the gendarmerie and local officials refer to large numbers of Albanians from the Anatolian interior from places such as Bursa, Eskişehir, Konya and others traveling toward the Turkish Aegean coast, in particular İzmir. Turkish authorities expressed concerns that Albanians were going to "make this place into Albania". Albanians kept arriving into Turkey illegally and their main destination was İzmir. In Kosovo between 1918 and 1923, as a result of Yugoslav state policies of Serbianisation 30,000 and 40,000 mainly Muslim Albanians migrated to the regions of Izmir and Anatolia.

From 1925 onward Yugoslavia sought an agreement with Turkey to allow for the migration of Muslims and Albania was concerned that it entailed the removal of Albanians from the Balkans for intended resettlement in depopulated parts of Turkey. Turkey reiterated to Albania its disinterest in Albanians from Yugoslavia coming to Anatolia and stated that the matter mainly related to ethnic Turks of Vardar Macedonia. By the mid-1920s, large numbers of Albanian refugees were present in Turkey and an understanding had arisen with Albania to cooperate and stem Albanian migration from Yugoslavia that decreased substantially during the remainder of the decade.

Based in Ankara, the data gathered for 1919-1940 by the Yugoslav Legation shows 215,412 Albanians migrated to Turkey from Yugoslavia. Between 1923 and 1939, some 115,000 Yugoslav citizens migrated to Turkey and both Yugoslavian and Turkish sources state that Albanians composed most of that population group. Albanian scholars from Albania and Kosovo place the number of Albanian refugees from 300,000 upward into the hundreds of thousands and state that they left Yugoslavia due to duress. Other estimates given by scholars outside the Balkans for Kosovan Albanians that emigrated during 1918-1941 are between 90,000 and 150,000 or 200,000-300,000. To date, access is unavailable to the Turkish Foreign Ministry archive regarding this issue and as such the total numbers of Albanians arriving to Turkey during the interwar period are difficult to determine.

Turkey attempted to resettle these Albanians in eastern Anatolia within areas such as Yozgat, Elazığ, and Diyarbakır, whereas many Albanians eventually settled in Eskişehir, Kocaeli, Tekirdağ, İzmir, Bursa and Istanbul. Albanians from Yugoslavia migrated to Turkey for a variety of reasons that included confiscations of land and redistribution to Serb colonists in Kosovo alongside the warfare between the armed Albanian Kaçak resistance movement active in Kosovo and north-western Macedonia with Yugoslav authorities. Yugoslav authorities viewed Albanians as a hostile population and preferred to reduce their presence in Yugoslavia, whereas Turkey wanted to repopulate areas of Anatolia that had been emptied of its previous Orthodox Greek speaking and Turkish speaking Christians during the population exchange.

In 1933, the Turkish foreign minister Tevfik Rüştü Aras made several visits to the Yugoslav Foreign Ministry in Belgrade and discussed the deportation of Muslims from the area of Yugoslavia that had been designated as South Serbia to Anatolia. Foreign minister Aras and the Yugoslav Milan Stojadinović after five years of negotiations signed a convention regarding the migration of Muslim Turks to Turkey. The agreement referred to the proposed relocation of 40,000 families during 1939–1944 in accordance with regulations and requirements such as being fluent in Turkish, exclusion of Romani and targeting municipalities in Kosovo and western Macedonia for the migration process. Rural communities were the main targets of the measures and properties of deported people were to be liquidated in Yugoslavia. The journey to Anatolia from the port of Thessaloniki would be funded mainly by Turkey with a joint Turkish-Yugoslav commission monitoring the situation.

Archival and printed documentation from the era show the agreement to have been a misleading and deceptive text in its written composition and intent, as the outcome was for the removal of the Albanian population to Turkey. Atatürk met with Yugoslav authorities as the bilateral convention was negotiated and later presented the agreement to the Turkish Assembly for ratification. Five months prior to the death of Atatürk, the Turkish Assembly during July 1938 refused to ratify the agreement and with the onset of the Second World War, the matter was not reopened. Of all those who settled in villages where Albanians became or are the only population, the language has been retained to various degrees, whereas in ethnically mixed areas language retention has been obsolete.

==== Third Phase: 1945-2000s ====
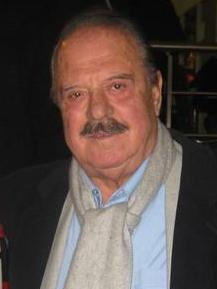
İlhan Cavcav, businessman and chairman of Gençlerbirliği football club

The third phase of Albanian migration to Turkey involves the post-world war two period until 1999. Albanian migrants during this era originated from Yugoslavia, in particular Kosovo during the 1950s–1970s often due to discrimination and or pressure exhibited by the state on Albanians to declare themselves Turkish and migrate to Turkey. After the Second World War and the Yugoslavia-Albania split, Yugoslav authorities attempted to downplay links between Albanians of Albania and Kosovo and to implement a policy of "Turkification" that encouraged Turkish language education and emigration to Turkey among Albanians. In 1953, an agreement which revived the 1938 convention was reached between Yugoslav President Josip Broz Tito and Mehmet Fuat Köprülü, the foreign minister of Turkey that promoted the emigration of Albanians to Anatolia.

Forced migration to Turkey increased and numbers cited by Klejda Mulaj for 1953-1957 are 195,000 Albanians leaving Yugoslavia and for 1966, some 230,000 people. Numbers cited by Tim Judah estimate that between 1952 and 1967 some 175,000 Muslims emigrated from Yugoslavia and though many were Macedonian speaking Muslims (Torbeš), Bosniaks and ethnic Turks, the majority of migrants were Albanians. Historian Noel Malcolm placed the number of Albanians leaving for Turkey at 100,000 between 1953 and 1966. Factors involved in the upsurge of migration were intimidation and pressure toward the Albanian population to leave through a campaign headed by Yugoslav police chief Aleksandar Ranković that officially was stated as aimed at curbing Albanian nationalism. Kosovo under the control of Ranković was viewed by Turkey as the individual that would implement "the Gentleman's Agreement." The situation ended in 1966 with the removal of Ranković from his position. Many of these Albanians from Yugoslavia settled in urban centres such as İzmir, Gemlik and Aydın. With the fall of communism, some Albanians arrived from Albania to Turkey after 1992. In 1999, some Albanians arrived to Turkey fleeing the conflict in Kosovo. Albanians from this third group have mainly settled in large urban centres located in western areas of Turkey.

=== Albanians in Turkey today and transnational links with Balkan Albanians ===
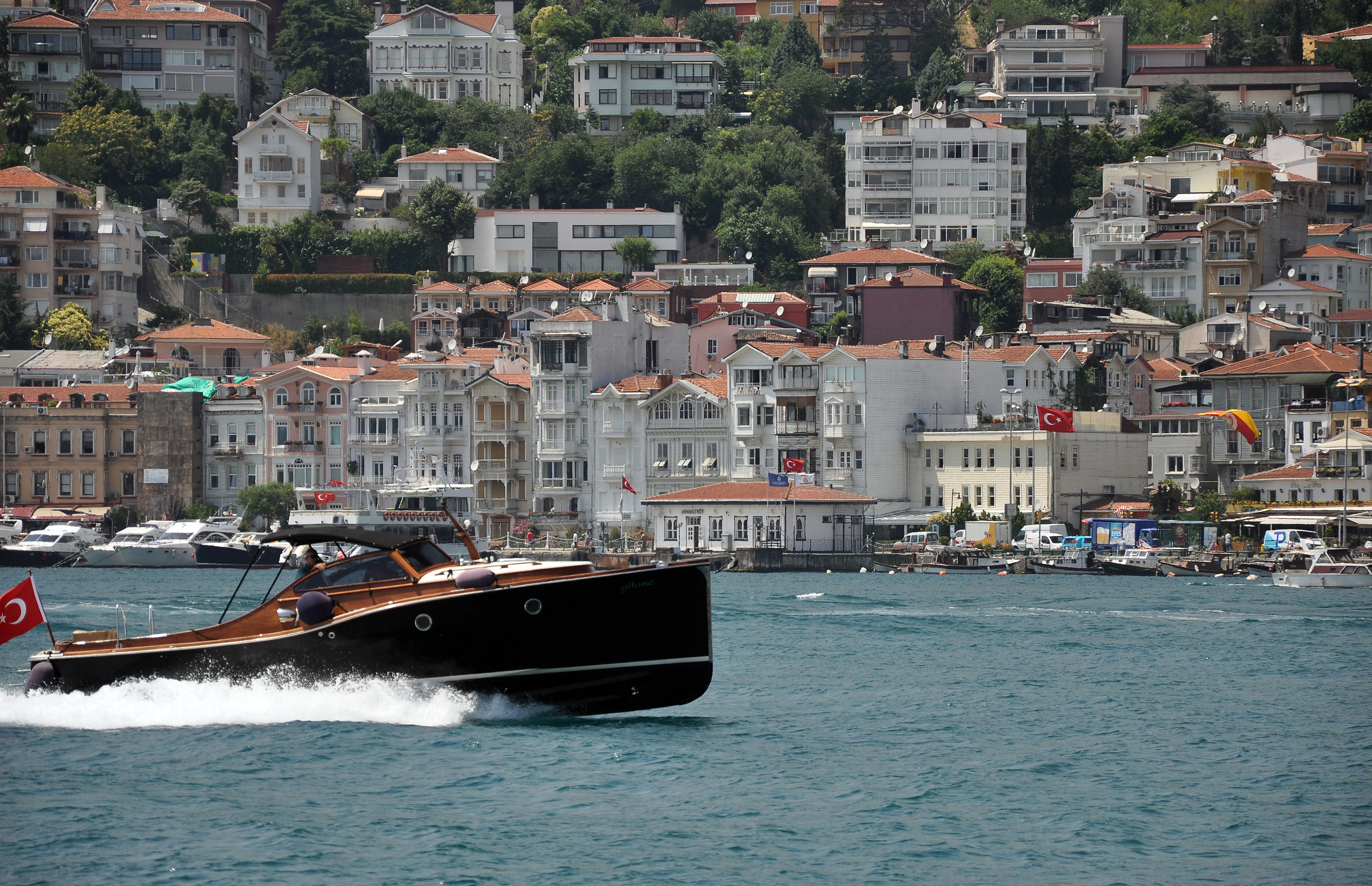
The historic neighbourhood of Arnavutköy (Albanian village) in Istanbul was established in the 15th century as the Sultan Mehmed the Conqueror brought Albanians to the city. Today, the Albanian people of Istanbul maintains a distinct Albanian identity and culture.

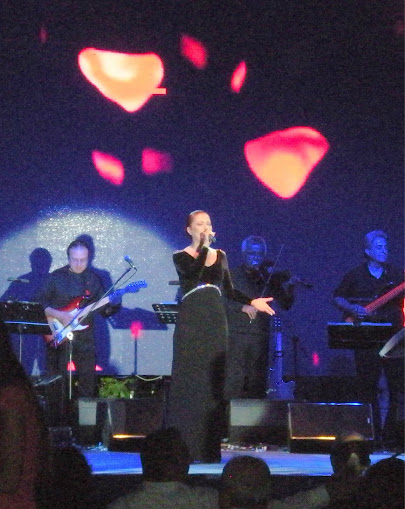
Candan Erçetin, singer, songwriter, and vice-president of Galatasaray football club of partial Albanian origin

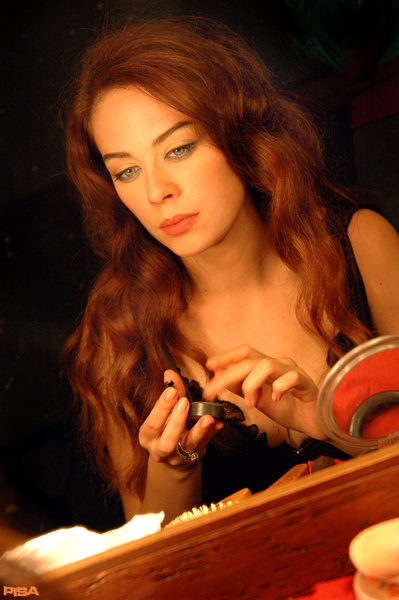
Demet Evgar, Turkish actress of partial Albanian descent.

There are Albanian language schools in Turkey. The Turkish-Albanian Brotherhood Culture and Solidarity Association aims to preserve Albanian culture and traditions by hosting cultural nights and folklore festivals. This organization based in Bayrampaşa (Istanbul) has three branches located in Küçükçekmece and in the provinces of Ankara and Bursa. It also provides Albanian language classes throughout the year and organizes celebrations to commemorate the independence of Albania.

Albanians are active in the civic life of Turkey. In Turkey, Albanians participate in Turkish politics through membership of local and national cultural associations (dernek). These organisations range from the more religiously conservative Rumeli Türk Derniği, the ethno-nationalist Türk-Arnavut Kardeșliği and the more community oriented Sakarya Arnavutları Kültür ve Dayanıșma Derniği. After the Turks and Kurds, Albanians are the third most represented ethnic group of parliamentarians in the Turkish parliament, though belonging to different political parties. The Albanian diaspora in the country lobbied the Turkish government for recognition of Kosovo's independence by Turkey.

State relations of Albania and Kosovo with Turkey are friendly and close, due to the Albanian population of Turkey maintaining close links with Albanians of the Balkans and vice versa and also Turkey maintaining close socio-political, cultural, economic and military ties with Albania and Kosovo. Albanians who migrated in a post Second World War context, in particular from Kosovo and Macedonia have closer family contact with relatives in Turkey and vice versa than those from Albania whose migrations to Anatolia occurred much earlier. Turkey has been supportive of Albanian geopolitical interests within the Balkans. In Gallup polls conducted in the 2010s, Turkey is viewed as a friendly country with a positive image amongst a large majority of people in Albania, Kosovo and the Republic of Macedonia which contains a sizable Albanian minority.

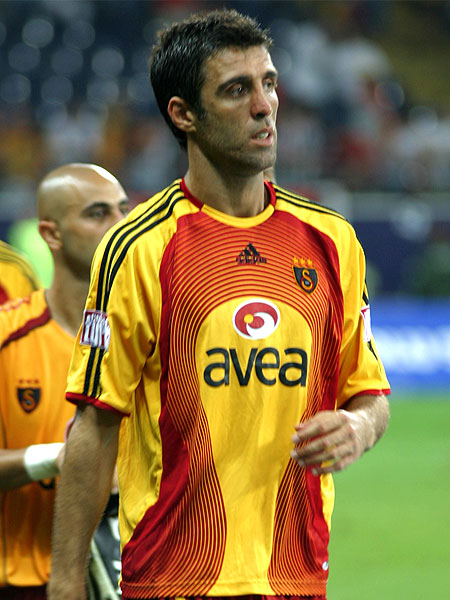
Hakan Şükür, footballer and politician

Albanians form a significant population group in Turkey and have contributed to Turkish society and the state with many merchants, army officers, labourers, officials, educators and intellectuals. The Turkish military has traditionally viewed Albanian identity in Turkey as a sub-ethnic identity alongside others forming part of the larger state-centric Turkish identity and that debates about primary versus sub-identities would undermine (Turkish) national identity.

The current AKP Turkish political leadership has acknowledged that there are large numbers of people with Albanian origins within Turkey, more so than in Albania and Kosovo combined and are aware of their influence and impact on domestic Turkish politics. Albanian identity in Turkey was given prominent focus in 2013 when Hakan Şükür, a former soccer player turned politician declared "I am Albanian, as such I am not a Turk" while giving a university speech which caused media controversy and heated public discussions about Turkish identity.

In 2016, as part of a state project named "living languages and accents in Turkey" the Turkish government accepted the Albanian language as a selective course for its schools and announced that classes would start in 2018, first being piloted in areas with people of Balkan origins. The first inaugural Albanian language class opened (2018) in a school within the Izmir area, attended by the Turkish and Albanian education ministers İsmet Yılmaz and Lindita Nikolla.

=== Cham Albanians in Turkey ===
Muslim Chams in Turkey form the second largest community of Chams, after Albania. This community was established after the two World Wars. After the First World War, Chams were forced to leave for Turkey during the population exchange, and another migration wave followed after the Second World War, when a minority of the Chams expelled from Greece chose Turkey over Albania because of their anti-communist sentiments.

The exact number of Muslim Chams in Turkey is unknown, but various estimates conclude that they number between 80,000 and 100,000, from a total population of 1.3 to 6 million Albanians that live in Turkey. The Chameria Human Rights Association declares that most of them have been linguistically assimilated, although they maintain Albanian consciousness and regional Cham traditions. A considerable number of Chams in Turkey have changed their surnames to Cam or Cami, which in Turkish means pine, in order to preserve their origin. They are organized within the "Albanian-Turkish Brotherhood Association" (Albanian: Shoqëria e Vllazërisë Shqiptaro-Turke, Turkish: Türk-Arnavut Kardeşliği Derneği), which fights for the rights of Albanians.

=== Albanophone Romani ===
In Turkey there exists small communities of Albanian speaking Romani in Adana and Gaziantep who self-identify as Albanians and are employed in trades such as blacksmithing, metalwork and ironwork. The collapse of Ottoman rule in southern Europe due to the Balkan wars (1912-1913) caused their ancestors to migrate and settle in Turkey.

== Demographics ==
Albanian-speaking population in Turkey
Year	As first language	As second language	Total	Turkey's population	% of total speakers
1927	21,774	-	21,774	13,629,488	0.16
1935	14,496	26,161	40,657	16,157,450	0.25
1945	14,165	17,701	31,866	18,790,174	0.17
1950	16,079	-	16,079	20,947,188	0.08
1955	10,893	25,898	36,791	24,064,763	0.15
1960	12,000	37,144	49,144	27,754,820	0.18
1965	12,832	40,688	53,520	31,391,421	0.17

In the census of 1965, those who spoke Albanian as first language were proportionally most numerous in Bursa (0.3%), Sakarya (0.2%), Tokat (0.2%) and Istanbul (0.2%).

According to a 2008 report prepared for the National Security Council of Turkey by academics of three Turkish universities in eastern Anatolia, there were approximately 1,300,000 people of Albanian descent living in Turkey. According to that study, more than 500,000 Albanian descendants still recognize their ancestry and or their language, culture and traditions. In a 2011 survey, 0.2% within Turkey or roughly 150,000 people identify themselves as Albanian.

There are also other estimates regarding the Albanian population in Turkey that range from being 3-4 million people up to a total of 5 million in number, although most of these are Turkish citizens of either full or partial Albanian ancestry being no longer fluent in Albanian (cf. German Americans). This was due to various degrees of either linguistic and or cultural assimilation occurring amongst the Albanian diaspora in Turkey. Nonetheless, a sizable proportion of the Albanian community in Turkey, such as that of Istanbul, has maintained its distinct Albanian identity.

== See also ==
- Albania–Turkey relations
- Kosovo–Turkey relations
- Albania under the Ottoman Empire
- Arnaut
- Man of Soil (Njeriu prej Dheu) - 1984 Kosovan drama-thriller film about Albanian migration to Turkey
- Turks in Albania
