= Azem Shkreli =

Albanian writer

- Born: February 10, 1938; Peja, Kosova
- Died: May 24, 1997 (aged 59); Prishtina, Kosova
- Education: University of Prishtina
- Occupations: Poet, literary critic
- Writing career
- Language: Albanian
- Notable works: The White Caravan 1961; I Know a Word of Stone 1969

Azem Shkreli (Albanian pronunciation: [a'ʒɛm 'ʃkɾɛli]; 10 February 1938 – 24 May 1997) was a writer, poet, director and producer of Albanian ethnicity. He was head of the Kosovo Writers' Association, president of the Association of Writers of Yugoslavia, manager of the National Theatre of Kosovo (then People`s Provincial Theatre) in Pristina and founder and manager of Kosovafilm, a film production, distribution and screening company.

== Biography ==
Azem Shkreli was born on February 10, 1938, in the village of Shkrel of Peja, Kingdom of Yugoslavia (now Kosovo). His mother died when he was two years old, and he was brought up by his grandmother, who also died when he was young.

He went to elementary school in his hometown. In Pristina, he attended high school and graduated in 1961. He then went to the Faculty of Philosophy of the University of Pristina, to study in the Department of Albanian Language and Literature Studies, from which he graduated in 1965. As a student, he began writing for the daily newspaper Rilindja, and served as head of the Kosovo Writers' Association.

He worked as director of the National Theatre of Kosovo (then People's Provincial Theatre) from 1960 to 1975. In 1975 he became founder and director of Kosovafilm, a film production, distribution and screening company – a post he held until he was expelled by the new Serb administration in 1991.

He was the president of the Association of Writers of Yugoslavia between 1982 and 1983.

Shkreli was deeply concerned with the fate of Kosova, dedicating himself to the struggle for his people's fundamental human rights and liberation. During the 1990s, he spent some time in Germany, where his wife received medical treatment unavailable in Kosova. Despite this, he chose not to remain abroad with his family, instead returning to Prishtina to live alone. When invited to stay for three months at Villa Waldberta in Bavaria in 1993, he grew restless and left after only six weeks.

...For four nights I have endured a stone, Kosova, dripping away...

— Azem Shkreli, from the poem Villa Waldberta

Shkreli worked tirelessly, never losing sight of the ultimate goal: freedom and independence for his fellow Kosovo Albanians.

On May 24, 1997, he died at the Prishtina airport, just moments after stepping onto his homeland's soil following a visit to Germany.

== Works ==
His published works in poetry include:

- Bulzat (1960)
- Angels of the streets (1963)
- I know a stone vial (1969)
- From the bible of silence (1975)
- Baptism of the word (1981)
- Night of the parrots (1990)
- Rainy lyrics (1994)
- Birds and stones (1997)

His prose works include:

- The white caravan (1961)
- Eve's eyes (1975)
- The Albanian wall

His dramas include:

- Fosilet (1968)
- Varri i cyqes (1983)

His poems have been translated into many foreign languages.

Preceded by Duško Roksandić	President of the Association of Writers of Yugoslavia; 1982-1983	Succeeded by Kole Čašule
