= Antoneta Kastrati =

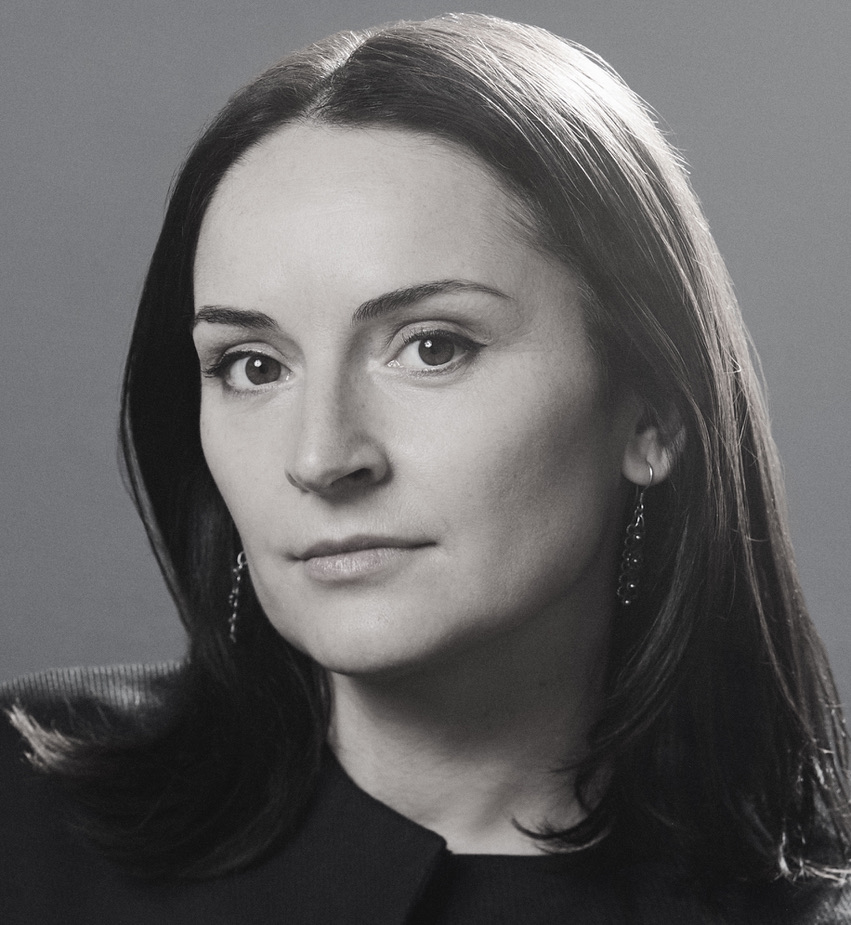
Antoneta Kastrati

Antoneta Kastrati (1981, Pejë, Kosovo) is a Kosovo-born film director and screenwriter, recognized as part of the "Kosovo New Wave" – the first generation of female directors in the country. Her work often explores themes of post-war society, social issues, and the complexities of human relationships.

== Filmmaking ==
Kastrati's early films, made in the aftermath of the Kosovo War, shed light on the struggles and experiences of individuals navigating post-conflict life. Her notable documentaries include "Dasmat dhe Pampersat" (Weddings and Diapers) and "Zana" (2010).

Kastrati frequently collaborates with her husband, American filmmaker Casey Cooper Johnson. Together, they have directed documentaries such as "Love Makes a Difference" (2011) and "Zana: The Unseen" (2019), which delve into social issues and gender dynamics in Kosovo.

Kastrati's work often delves into the complexities of marriage and relationships, particularly within the context of Kosovo's evolving social norms. Her documentary "Marriage and Diapers" examines the changing landscape of marriage customs, while "Love Makes a Difference" explores the challenges and triumphs of interfaith couples.

== Awards ==
Kastrati's films have garnered international recognition and awards. "Zana" received the Grand Jury Prize at the 2010 Kosovo Film Festival, and "Love Makes a Difference" was awarded Best Documentary at the 2011 Raindance Film Festival.

== Filmography ==
- 2007: Weddings and Diapers (documentary)
- 2009: Seeking Magic (documentary)
- 2010: The Guardian (documentary)
- 2011: The Kingdom of Coal (documentary)
- 2011: Kofja e Zbrazet (film, short film)
- 2012: Robin (documentary short film)
- 2012: Laleh (short documentary film)
- 2013: She Comes in Spring (film, short film)
- 2019: Zana
