= Man of Soil =

- Directed by: Agim Sopi
- Screenplay by: Agim Sopi, Fadil Hysaj
- Produced by: Kosova Film, Pristina
- Starring: Abdurrahman Shala, Bislim Muçaj, Lumnije Muçaj, Teuta Rrahmani.
- Cinematography: Menduh Nushi
- Edited by: Agron Vula
- Music by: Rauf Dhomi
- Distributed by: AS Film Production
- Release date: November 12, 1984
- Running time: 102 minutes
- Country: Kosovo
- Language: Albanian

Man of Soil (Albanian: Njeriu prej dheu) is a 1984 Kosovar drama-thriller film directed by Agim Sopi. The movie is about the Albanian immigrants in Turkey, their struggle to adjust to the new lands and their yearning for the motherland. The director accurately portrays the gloomy atmosphere that prevailed during those times. The score for the film was composed by the renowned Kosovo-born, Albanian composer Rauf Dhomi.

== Plot ==
Sokol, a middle aged man, together with his family, emigrates from Kosova to Turkey due to sociopolitical pressures. There he faces a foreign and unknown world. His son Bardhi, emigrates again from Turkey to Germany in order to work as a gastarbeiter and keep his family financially solvent. Sokol, remains in Turkey to look after his son's wife and children. After a while Sokol's wife dies and he remains alone with his son's family. His daughter in law, the wife of Bardhi, lives an intemperate and double life, which Sokol can not accept. He is completely lonely. Every day he walked along the sea, dreaming of returning to his homeland, Kosova. After some time, being sick from melancholy, he leaves his last will to his son that when he dies, his bones are to be returned in his country, in Kosova. The following day after, he leaves for Kosova, but is unable to pass the sea. He dies near off one cliff on the shore of the Black Sea.

At the time of his death, in his village in Kosova, there is some news that Sokol returned from emigration. The phantom of Sokol meets with his elderly sister who went mad after her child died in her youth, and his brother, Malo. In Sokol's eyes, nothing appears as it used to be. The land changed and the people of his age died long ago. His youth and age vanished completely from that side of the world. He keeps walking like a shadow, trying to reconstruct his past, encountering villagers he once knew along the way. After a period of time, his son Bardhi, returns to the village carrying a suitcase. In it he brought the bones of his father from Turkey, to bury them in his homeland. Sokol, later sees Bardhi asleep by the fireplace and opens the suitcase, views his remains and disappears. A mystery erupts among villagers if Sokol really died and returned home as a phantom or was alive the whole time.

== Cast ==
- Abdurrahman Shala - Sokol
- Bislim Muçaj - Bardh (Sokol's son)
- Lumnie Sopi - Tringa (Bardhi's village sweetheart)
- Teuta Rrahmani - Hana (Sokol's sister)
- Skënder Tafaj - Mala (Sokol's brother)
- Xhevat Qorraj - Rrap (villager)
- Avdush Hasani - Mema (villager)
- Ramadan Malaj - Burri (Mala's younger son)
- Hazir Myftari - unnamed (Mala's older son)

== See also ==
- Albanians in Turkey
