= Unwanted (film) =

2017 Kosovan film

- Film poster
- Directed by: Edon Rizvanolli
- Written by: Edon Rizvanolli
- Starring: Adriana Matoshi; Jason de Ridder
- Cinematography: Danny Noordanus
- Release dates: 1 July 2017 (Karlovy Vary); 14 September 2017 (Kosovo)
- Running time: 85 minutes
- Countries: Kosovo; Netherlands
- Languages: Dutch; Albanian

Unwanted (Albanian: T'padashtun) is a 2017 Kosovan social drama film directed by Edon Rizvanolli. It was selected as the Kosovan entry for the Best Foreign Language Film at the 90th Academy Awards, but it was not nominated.

== Plot ==
Alban, a teenage boy from Kosovo, had lived in the Netherlands with his mother since the Kosovo War. When Alban begins a romance with a sensitive young woman named Anna, dark memories of the past rise to the surface.

== Cast ==
- Adriana Matoshi as Zana
- Jason de Ridder as Alban
- Niki Verkaar as Ana
- Hugo Koolschijn as Rudi

== See also ==
- List of submissions to the 90th Academy Awards for Best Foreign Language Film
- List of Kosovan submissions for the Academy Award for Best Foreign Language Film
