= Home Sweet Home (2016 film) =

2016 Kosovan film

- Film poster
- Directed by: Faton Bajraktari
- Written by: Zymber Kelmendi
- Starring: Donat Qosja; Arta Muçaj; Shkumbin Istrefi; Lea Qosja
- Release date: 1 July 2016 (Karlovy Vary)
- Running time: 90 minutes
- Country: Kosovo
- Language: Albanian

Home Sweet Home is a 2016 Kosovan drama film directed by Faton Bajraktari. It was screened at the Karlovy Vary International Film Festival. It was selected as the Kosovan entry for the Best Foreign Language Film at the 89th Academy Awards but it was not nominated.

== Cast ==
- Donat Qosja
- Arta Muçaj
- Shkumbin Istrefi
- Lea Qosja

== See also ==
- List of submissions to the 89th Academy Awards for Best Foreign Language Film
- List of Kosovan submissions for the Academy Award for Best Foreign Language Film
