= Zana (film) =

2019 Kosovan film

- Film poster
- Directed by: Antoneta Kastrati
- Written by: Casey Cooper Johnson; Antoneta Kastrati
- Produced by: Casey Cooper Johnson; Antoneta Kastrati
- Starring: Adriana Matoshi; Astrit Kabashi; Fatmire Sahiti; Mensur Safaqiu; Irena Cahani
- Cinematography: Sevdije Kastrati
- Edited by: Antoneta Kastrati
- Music by: Dritero Nikqi
- Production company: Crossing Bridges Films
- Distributed by: Cineplexx Cinemas
- Release dates: 7 September 2019 (TIFF); 21 September 2019 (Kosovo)
- Running time: 97 minutes
- Country: Kosovo
- Language: Albanian

Zana is a 2019 Kosovan thriller tragedy film directed by Antoneta Kastrati. It was selected as the Kosovan entry for the Best International Feature Film at the 92nd Academy Awards, but it was not nominated.

== Plot ==
Haunted by her long suppressed past and pressured by family to seek treatment from mystical healers for her infertility, a Kosovar woman struggles to reconcile the expectations of motherhood with a legacy of wartime brutality.

== Cast ==
- Adriana Matoshi as Lume
- Astrit Kabashi as Ilir
- Fatmire Sahiti as Remzije
- Mensur Safaqiu as imam Murat
- Irena Cahani as Sorceress

== Critical reception ==
On the review aggregator website Rotten Tomatoes, 100% of 14 critics' reviews are positive.

== See also ==
- List of submissions to the 92nd Academy Awards for Best International Feature Film
- List of Kosovan submissions for the Academy Award for Best International Feature Film
