= Cinema of Kosovo =

The Cinematography in Kosovo in the Albanian language began its activities after the foundation of Kosovafilm, which produced short films, documentaries, cartoons and later feature films. Since 2008, the central authority for cinematography in Kosovo has been Kosovo Cinematography Center (KCC) though numerous independent film companies are active in Kosovo. Before Kosovafilm, there were no fully Kosovan films.

== History ==
=== Early beginning ===
Some of the earliest films shot on the modern-day territory of Kosovo are Oduzimanje oružja od Arnauta and Dule-hanu na putu za Prizren, which were screened in Vračar in 1912.

One of the notable Yugoslav films from the interwar period was Kroz naše Kosovo, shot in 1932. The movie was produced by the Yugoslav Ministry of Health in order to promote the importance of good hygienic habits.

By 1937 on the territory of modern-day Kosovo (then within the Kingdom of Yugoslavia), there were seven operating cinemas. There was one per town, located in Pristina, Prizren, Mitrovica, Gjilan, Ferizaj, Gjakova, and Peja. Cinematography in the former Yugoslavia after World War II was developed in accordance with the criteria of the League of Communists of Yugoslavia. Every republic in SFR Yugoslavia had centres of cinematography, so Kosovo not being a republic had access to these centres only through Belgrade to participate in documentary film production, artistic play and the education framework for cinematography. With the formation of the cultural centre began Albanian-language cinematography in Kosovo. The first artistic film was realised in 1955, Esalon doktora M. but the first movie in Albanian was Uka i Bjeshkeve te Nemura. The film's protagonist is Uka, an old Albanian man who lives in the mountains on the border of Yugoslavia (Kosovo) and Albania. As an honorable man, he must deal with his son who befriended Italian fascists during World War II. Era dhe lisi is the first completely Kosovan production movie.

=== Kosovafilm industry ===
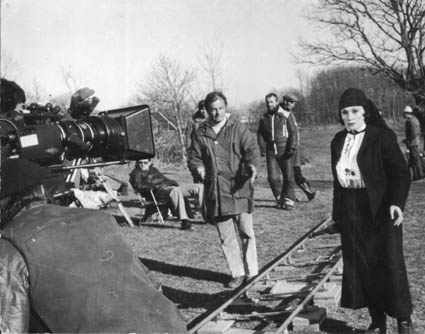
Filming "When Spring Comes Late"-1979, Kosovo

The Kosovo film industry dates from the 1970s. On 20 February 1969, the parliament of Kosovo established Kosovafilm, a state institution for the production, distribution and showing of films. Its initial director was actor Abdurrahman Shala, followed by writer and noted poet Azem Shkreli, under whose direction the most successful films were produced. Subsequent directors of Kosovafilm were Xhevar Qorraj, Ekrem Kryeziu and Gani Mehmetaj. After producing seventeen feature films, numerous short films and documentaries, the institution was taken over by the Serbian authorities in 1990 and dissolved. Kosovafilm was reestablished after the Yugoslav withdrawal from the region in June 1999 and has since been endeavoring to revive the film industry in Kosovo.

Kosovafilm produced eight feature films in BCS, mostly partisan war films, many of which were in collaboration with Filmske Novosti and Avala Film of Belgrade. Its first Albanian-language production was the film Kur pranvera vonohet (When Spring Comes Late), which premiered on 12 July 1979 and was directed by Ekrem Kryeziu and was based on Fadil Hoxha's partisan diary. Perhaps the best-known, and last of the nine Albanian-language feature films of the period, was Rojet e mjegulles (The Keepers of the Fog), which premiered on 15 June 1988. It was also directed by lsa Qosja and starred Xhevat Qorraj, Enver Petrovci, Florie Siarina and Cun Lajçi.

Some of the films produced by Kosovafilm are:

Film	Director	Year
Kukumi	Isa Qosja	2005
Rojet e mjegulles	Isa Qosja	1988
Pikniku	Emin Halili	1986
Njeriu prej dheut	Agim Sopi	1984
Proka	Isa Qosja	1984
Lepuri me pesë këmbë	Ismail Ymeri	1982
Swelling River	Besim Sahatçiu	1981
Kur pranvera vonohet	Ekrem Kryeziu	1980
Tito e Kosova 79	Besim Sahatçiu	1980
Gjurmët e barëdha	Ekrem Kryeziu	1980
Kur pranvera vonohet	Ekrem Kryeziu	1979
Kur pranvera xhirohet	Isa Qosja	1979
Era dhe lisi	Besim Sahatçiu	1979
Reslovi	Ekrem Kryeziu	1978
Loja e rufaive	Azem Shkreli Azem Shkreli, Gani Bobi	1977
Vizita e shokut Tito ne Kosovë	Azem Shkreli	1976
117	Besim Sahatçiu	1976
Tito in Kosovo	Besim Sahatçiu	1975
Dita e mërgimtarëve	Ekrem Kryeziu	1975
Pikë e gurë	Ekrem Kryeziu	1975
Brigada e VII e Kosovës	Ekrem Kryezi	1974
Uka i Bjeshkëve të nemura	Miomir 'Miki' Stamenkovic	1968

=== Modern cinematography ===
Kosovo Cinematography Center is public film fund and central authority for cinematography. Its objective is achieving goals on public interest on cinematography issues. It became a member of the pan-European organization –European Film Promotion (EFP). This decision was taken at the General Assembly of this organisation and it was announced in 2012. Kosovo became the 33rd member of this network organisation. In 2014, Kosovo Cinematography Center got accepted at the “Academy of Motion Picture Arts and Sciences” that organizes the ceremony of “Oscar” awards. Kosovan films have participated in many international film festivals, such as: Berlin International Film Festival, Sundance Film Festival, San Sebastián International Film Festival, Sarajevo Film Festival, Monterrey international film festival, International Film Festival Rotterdam, Melbourne International Film Festival, Abu Dhabi Film Festival, Winterthur Film Festival, Thessaloniki International Film Festival, Warsaw International Film Festival, etc. They have also won prizes in many of these festivals. The most recent festival winners are Visar Morina's "Exile", which won the top prize at the Sarajevo Film Festival in 2020, and Blerta Basholli's "Zgjoi"(Hive), which won 3 prizes at Sundance in early 2021.

== Featured figures ==
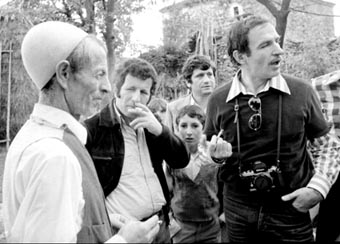
The famous actor Bekim Fehmiu. Kosovo, 1978.

Bekim Fehmiu was born on 1 June 1936 in Sarajevo. He was an ethnic Albanian and his family moved to the Kosovo region, where, as a 20-year-old amateur boxer and manual worker. His big break was the 1967 film I Even Met Happy Gypsies, a subtle portrayal of Roma life which won two awards in Cannes and was nominated for an Oscar. In 1974 Fehmiu appeared in the title role The Adventures of Ulysses, with Irene Papas as Penelope, and in John Frankenheimer's Black Sunday (1977) he played a Palestinian terrorist alongside Robert Shaw and Marthe Keller.

The New York Times dubbed him the "Yugoslav heart-throb" for his youthful conquests and acquaintances with the likes of Brigitte Bardot and Ava Gardner. Decades after his last appearance on the screen, readers of a leading Italian women's magazine voted him one of the ten most attractive men of the 20th century. He committed suicide in his Belgrade apartment on 15 June 2010. According to his last wish, Bekim Fehmiu's ashes were scattered across the river Bistrica near his hometown of Prizren.

Faruk Begolli was the most famous Kosovo Albanian actor and director in Yugoslavia (along with Bekim Fehmiu). He attended high school in Pristina and completed the academy of film in Belgrade (1966). Begolli played in more than 60 films, starting with Veljko Bulajić's Pogled u zenicu Sunca (1966). He cooperated with director Puriša Đorđević in his films Podne (Noon), Jutro (The Morning), and San (The Dream). In the late 1980s, Begolli returned from Belgrade to Kosovo, where he worked at the University of Pristina as a professor at the Faculty of Drama. His last lead role was in Ekrem Kryeziu's Dashuria e Bjeshkeve te Nemuna (Love in the Damned Mountain), and his last piece was Etjet e Kosoves (Kosovo: Desperate Search), where he was also a co-scenarist. He died in 2007, after a long battle with cancer.

Arta Dobroshi is famous with her role in the screen drama Lorna’s Silence (winner of Best Screenplay at the 2008 Cannes Film Festival). This young actress achieved her international breakthrough and a nomination for the 2008 European Film Awards. Born in Pristina, she has played many stage roles in her country, as well as a leading role in the prize-winning German-Albanian production Magic Eye (2005), a film about the situation in Albania in 1997, when it was rocked by unrest. She starred in the films Three Worlds (2012), Late Bloomers (2011), Baby (II) (2010), Lorna's Silence (2008), The Sadness of Mrs. Snajdrova (2008), and Magic eye (2005).

== Kosovo film festivals ==
- Dokufest
- Skena Up
- Prishtina International Film Festival
- Rolling Film Festival
- Anibar International Animation Festival

=== Dokufest ===
The International Documentary and Short Film Festival is the largest film event in Kosovo. The Festival is organized in August in Prizren which attracts numerous international and regional artists. In this annually organized festival films are screened twice a day in three open air cinemas as well as in two regular cinemas. Except for its films, the festival is also well known for lively nights after the screening. Various events happen within the scope of the festival: workshops, DokuPhoto exhibitions, festival camping, concerts, which altogether turn the city into a charming place to be. In 2010 Dokufest was voted as one of the 25 best international documentary festivals. In 2010 Dokufest was voted as one of the 25 best international documentary festivals.

=== Skena up ===
Founded in October 2003 by a group of students and young artists, Skena Up is the NGO that organizes the International Students’ Film and Theatre Festival in Kosovo.

=== PRI film fest ===
PriFest aims to develop local and international talent, by enhancing growth of the industry in the country.

=== Rolling film festival ===
The Rolling Film Festivals have become Kosovo’s event for introducing other Kosovan communities to the Roma community, for supporting Romani artistic expression, and for providing a venue for combating stereotypes and promoting positive inter-ethnic relations. Kosovo has an Action Plan for integration of Roma in national life, including culture. The project will seek MOUs with appropriate government agencies recognizing this program as an aspect of the Action Plan, and support for the project in approach to schools and community venues. European goals, as embodied in European level and national action plans, and in the Decade of Roma Inclusion, recognize education, culture, and non-discrimination as necessary and fundamental means for breaking the cycle of poverty, and including marginalized minorities successfully in national life.

=== Anibar International Animation Festival ===
The AniBar International Animation Festival is the only festival of animated film in Kosovo. The AniBar Festival is organized by NGO 'Anibar Group' and is held in August in the town of Peć. The aim of the festival is to present to the public of Kosovo the latest global trends in the field of animated film, as well as create an environment for young writers and animators to be able to create their art. The Anibar Festival started in August 2010, with the main aim of creating a new platform in Kosovo for the animated film genre, as well as encouraging and enabling young authors to create new works with classical and contemporary techniques. In 2011, the Anibar Festival was already officially represented at the annual Dok Leipzig festival in Germany. Animated films that are screened in AniBar are divided into three categories: competitive program, special program and the program 'Kids for Kids Animations'. Admission to the competitions for animated films is open every year from January 30 to April 30.

== See also ==
- Cinema of Albania
- Cinema of North Macedonia

== Exterlal links ==
- Kosovo Cinematography Center (KCC)
