= Çun Lajçi =

Çun Lajçi (born 18 December 1946) is an Albanian actor, musician, author, and drama teacher from Kosovo. He is famous for reciting poems from The Highland Lute (Lahuta e Malsisë). He is also a lahuta player. Lajçi has played over 200 roles and has been in 30 movies. He has been nominated twice as best actor in Serbia in the theater organization "Joakim Vujić". He received the "Naim Frashëri" award from the Albanian presidency. He has released two books, "Zjarr i pashuar" and "Fake Noses in Bëhet vonë".

== Background ==
Lajçi was born on 18 December 1946 in Drelaj, Peja, Kosovo. He started school in Drelaj, and continued at the drama school in Prizren. He then proceeded to Prishtina. In 1970, he worked as an actor in Prishtina's city theater.

== Work ==
Cun Lajçi is a passionate activist and lahutor and has released many videos and songs where he dramatizes various political and historical events in Albanian national interests. He has released many recitals of Lahuta e Malsisë. Lajci himself has said that he lives a poor life and in a residence he received by Josip Bros Tito during the time of ancient Yugoslavia. On a television broadcast he received a renovation of his apartment with no charge for which he expressed gratitude, via a construction company sponsored by the program. He has strongly criticized Hashim Thaqi for deceiving the interests of the Albanian people.

== Family ==
In December 2017, the Albanian media reported that Lajçi's daughter, Bubulina Lajçi, had died from an overdose. Lajçi criticized the media claiming they made his daughter's death into sensational news. According to Lajçi, his daughter died in her mother's arms. In a broadcast, Lajçi said he had been poor for a long time and struggled to support his family. He often thought about going to New York and selling books on the street. Later, his sister also died, as he reported through social media.
