= Kosovafilm =

Kosovafilm

Kosovafilmi was a film production, distribution and screening company in Socialist Autonomous Province of Kosovo, Yugoslavia. Established on 20 February 1969, its first general director was Abdurrahman Shala. The following directors were Azem Shkreli, in which period the best movies of Kosovafilm were produced, also Xhevat Qorraj and Ekrem Kryeziu. The actual director of Kosovafilm is Gani Mehmetaj.

Kosovafilm produced short movies, documentaries, cartoons and later feature movies. In year 1969, Kosovafilm made its first coproduction with Filmske Novosti, Belgrade, after that the company started collaborations with several other big Balkan film production companies.

In 1971 the department of distribution was established: movies were brought with exclusive screening rights for Yugoslavia and Balkan countries. Over 200 feature movies and foreign production were distributed.
