= Yervand Manaryan =

Iranian-born Armenian actor (1924–2020)

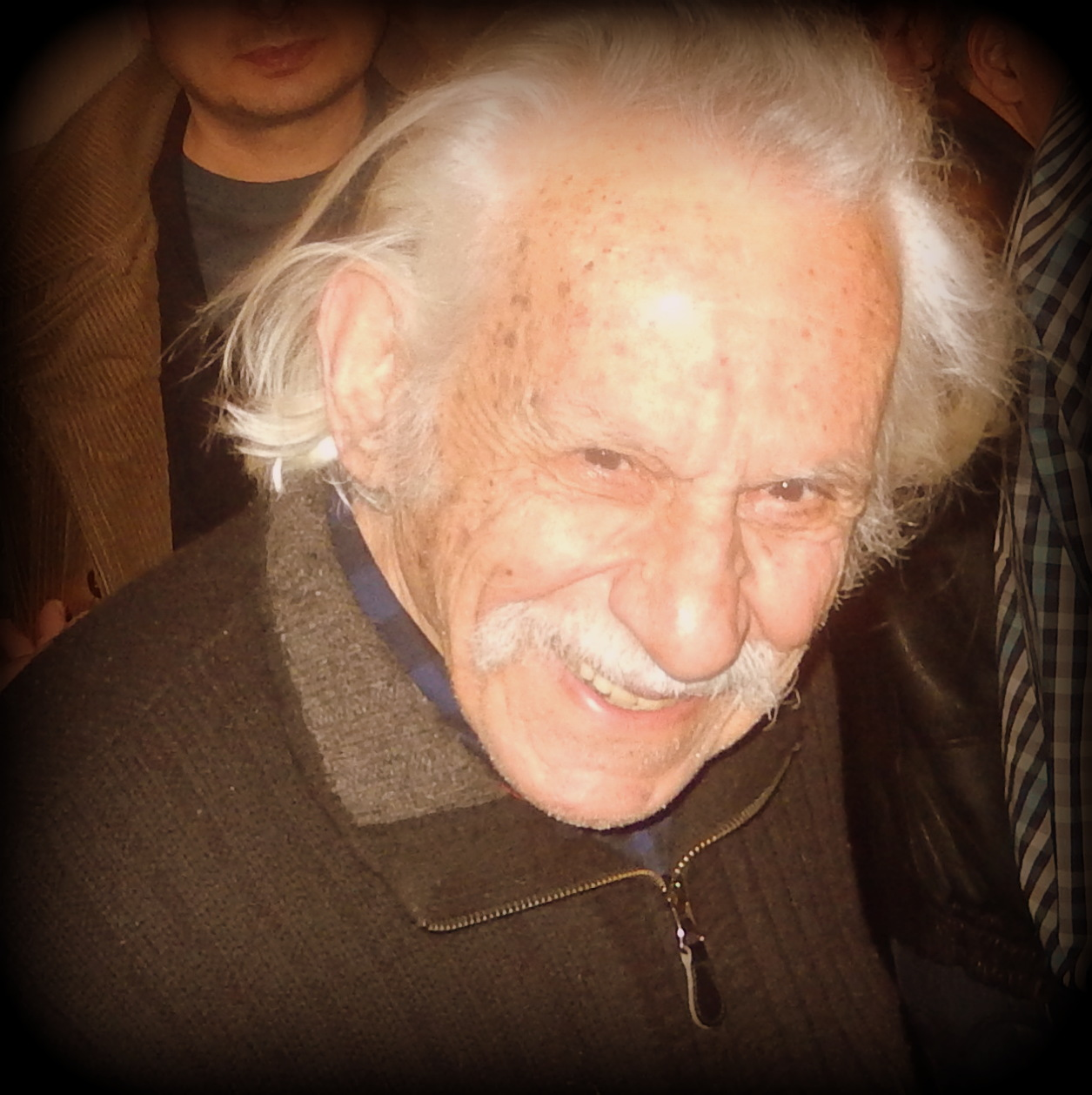
- Born: September 20, 1924; Arak, Iran
- Died: February 19, 2020 (aged 95)
- Occupation: Actor

Yervand Manaryan (Armenian: Երվանդ Մանարյան; September 20, 1924 – February 19, 2020) was an Iranian-born Armenian actor.

== Biography ==
Manaryan was born in Arak, Iran in 1924 in a family from Agulis, Nakhichevan. In 1946 his family repatriated to Soviet Armenia along with thousands of other Iranian Armenians. He was an atheist.

The actor was a member of the Armenian National Congress of former President Levon Ter-Petrosyan.

Manaryan died in February 2020, aged 95.

== Filmography ==
According to IMDb

- Karine (1969)
- Morgan's Relative (1970)
- Chaos (1974)
- A Bride from the North (1975)
- Priekhali na konkurs povara... (1977)
- Arevik (1978)
- Captain Arakel (1986)
- Comrade Panjuni (1992)
- Le piano (2011)
- Garegin Nzhdeh (2013)

== Awards ==
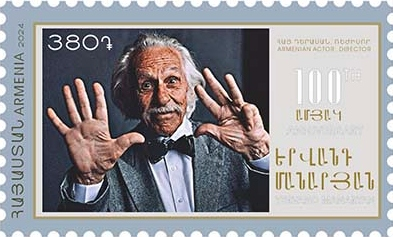
Manaryan on a 2024 stamp of Armenia

- Honored Artist of Armenia (2003)
- Artavazd Award of the UTEA (2005)
- Honorary Citizen of Yerevan (2019)
