= Blerta Basholli =

Kosovar film director (born 1983)

- Born: 1983 (age 42–43); Pristina, SFR Yugoslavia
- Education: New York University
- Occupations: Writer, director, producer
- Years active: 2006–present
- Notable work: Hive; Lena and Me; Mirror, Mirror...
- Spouse: Artan Korenica
- Children: 2

Blerta Basholli is a Kosovar Albanian writer, director and producer. Basholli has previously lived in New York City for a time span of four years, allowing her to work on a number of projects as a student, among those being her short film "Lena and Me" which won awards in a number of international and Kosovo-based festivals. In 2008, she was awarded with the Deans Fellowship at the Film Graduate Program at Tisch School of the Artists, NYU. Most recently, her debut feature film Hive (2021) has achieved great success, breaking Sundance Records, and becoming the first Kosovo film to enter the Oscars shortlist nomination.

== Personal life ==
Basholli completed her higher education at NYU, New York City, however she is currently based in Prishtina. She is married to Artan Korenica, a well-known Kosovan photographer, with whom she has two children.

== Career ==
2006-2011: Beginnings

In 2006, Basholli came out with her first film, the documentary "Mirror, Mirror…". It went on to have substantial success, being selected at the Sarajevo Film Festival 2006; Tirana International Film Festival 2006; Balkan Black Box Film Festival 2006, Berlin and the New York International Independent Film and Video Festival 2016. In 2008, she released "Gjakova 726", a short film that was shown at the Rotterdam Film Festival 2009; Busho Film Festival 2009; Dokufest 2009; Toffifest 2009; Filmmor's Women's Film Festival 2009. Later on, in 2011, Basholli's short film "Lena and Me'' was screened and awarded at the First Run Film Festival 2011; Dokufest 2011; Pogradec Film and Food Festival 2011; Skena Up 2011; Tirana International FF 2011 and the 9/11 Film Festival 2012 (Best Actress Award).

2021–Present: Worldwide Recognition

Her most known film comes in 2021, and it tells the true story of Fahrije Hoti, a Kosovan woman's challenge of opening a business in a patriarchal community. The film is called Hive and it is Basholli's first feature film.Hive broke Sundance records, where it won the Grand Jury Prize, the Directing Award, and the Audience Award in the World Cinema Dramatic Category. Through Hive Basholli has also become the first Kosovan director to make it into the Oscars nomination shortlist, in the Best International Feature category.

== Filmography ==
=== Feature films ===
Year	English Title	Original Title	Notes
2006	Mirror, Mirror...		Documentary
2021	Hive	Zgjoi	
2026	Dua		Post-production

=== Short films ===
- Gjakova 726 (co-writer, director) 2008

=== Other credits ===
1. Lena dhe Unë (Short) (writer) 2011
2. Everything Is Broken Up and Dances (co-producer) 2016
3. The Marriage (first assistant director) 2017
4. The Return (assistant director) 2017
5. Unwanted (first assistant director) 2017
6. Looking for Venera (first assistant director) 2021
7. Cold November (production manager) 2018
