= Three Windows and a Hanging =

2014 Kosovan film

- Directed by: Isa Qosja
- Written by: Zymber Kelmendi
- Starring: Irena Cahani; Luan Jaha; Donat Qosja; Xhevat Qorraj; Leonora Mehmetaj
- Release dates: 19 August 2014 (Sarajevo); 4 September 2014 (Kosovo)
- Running time: 93 minutes
- Country: Kosovo
- Language: Albanian

Three Windows and a Hanging (Albanian: Tri dritare dhe një varje) is a 2014 Kosovan drama film directed by Isa Qosja. It was selected as the Kosovan entry for the Best Foreign Language Film at the 87th Academy Awards, but was not nominated. It was the first time that Kosovo submitted a film in this category.

== Cast ==
- Irena Cahani as Lushe
- Luan Jaha as Uka
- Donat Qosja as Sokol
- Xhevat Qorraj as Alush
- Leonora Mehmetaj as Nifa
- Lyra Xhoci as Interpreter

== Awards ==
Three Windows and a Hanging won the Critics Award at the Luxembourg City Film Festival in 2015.

== See also ==
- List of submissions to the 87th Academy Awards for Best Foreign Language Film
- List of Kosovan submissions for the Academy Award for Best Foreign Language Film
