= Blerta Zeqiri =

Film director from Kosovo

- Born: 1979 (age 46–47); Kosovo
- Occupation: Film director
- Years active: 2004–present
- Notable work: The Return (2012); The Marriage (2018)
- Awards: Knight of the Order of Arts and Letters (2019)

Blerta Zeqiri (born 1979) is a film director from Kosovo. Her work primarily focuses on missing people and LGBT rights issues.

Zeqiri was born in 1979 in Kosovo and grew up in Suva Reka. As a teen, she was a hip-hop artist in Kosovo. In 1999, her and her family escaped a massacre in their hometown during the Kosovo War; Zeqiri subsequently immigrated that year to France, as a refugee of the war.

In 2004, Zeqiri co-directed the short film "Exit". She directed the short movie "The Return" ("Kthimi"), which was shot in three days and was about a couple that reunited after the Kosovo War. The film won the Jury Prize in Short Film, International Fiction at the Sundance Film Festival in 2012. Her debut feature-length film, The Marriage ("Martesa"), was released in 2018 and focused on LGBT rights. The Marriage was directed by Zeqiri and co-written by her and Kreshnik Berisha, her partner. In 2018, Kosovo selected the film as their country's submission for the Oscars' best foreign-language film category.

In 2019, she was awarded a Knight of the Order of Arts and Letters from France.
