= Atrpet =

Armenian writer

Sargis Mubayeajian
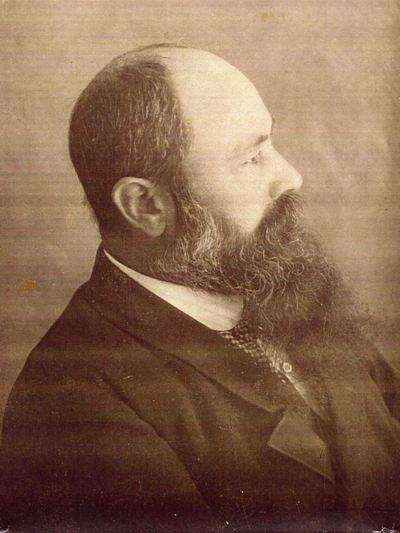
- Born: January 31, 1860; Kars, Ottoman Armenia
- Died: May 27, 1937 (aged 77); Leninakan, Armenian SSR
- Occupations: Novelist and writer

Sargis Mubayeajian (Armenian: Սարգիս Մուբայաջյան; January 31, 1860 – May 27, 1937), better known by his pen name Atrpet (Adrbed in Western Armenian, Armenian: Ատրպետ), was a prolific and multifarious Armenian writer.

== Biography ==
Having been educated in Kars and Constantinople, he lived mostly in Transcaucasia, wandering from one city to another (Alexandropol, Tiflis, Akhalkalaki, Baku, etc.) and in Tabriz. In the mid-1890s he was incarcerated by the Russian government for his political activities in the ranks of the Hunchak Party. Atrpet toured Europe in 1905–06, and spent the rest of his life in Alexandrapol (Leninakan, now Gyumri, Armenia). Many of his works are still scattered in Armenian periodicals. Atrpet was also known for his articles on Armenian history and numismatics.

Atrpet is mostly recognized as the author of the popular novel Tjvjik.
