= Isa Qosja =

Albanian film director

Isa Qosja (born in Vuthaj, Montenegro in 1949) is an Albanian film director. After gymnasium he studied dramatic art and acting in faculty of Prishtina.

== Life and career ==
After he studied Academy of film, theater, radio and television in Belgrade.

Isa Qosja is the author of many artistic and documentary films, among the best known is "Proka" which has featured in many international festivals, including the RIFJ Cannes. His second feature film, "Rojat e Mjegullës" (1988) dealt with the suffering and treatment of Albanians in time of the great communist repression.

In 2005 he directed Kukumi.

In 2014 he directed "Tri Dritare dhe Nje Varje" (Three Windows and a Hanging), which became the first Kosovan film to be submitted for the Academy Award for Best Foreign Language Film but it didn't get nominated.

== Filmography and awards ==
- Proka (1985)
- Grand Prix on RIFJ, Cannes, 1986
- Prix des Jury de Jeunes aux Rencontres
- Internationales du Film et Jeunesse de RIFJ Cannes, 1986
- 2nd Prize of the Public RIFJ Canes 1986
- ROJET E MJEGULLËS 1987
- Best original music - Pula Festival 1987
- The best film - Pardubice
- KUKUMI (2005)
- Special Jury Prize, Sarajevo Film Festival, Bosnia-Herzegovina
- 62 Mostra International Cinematography di Venetia, Regione di Venetio, Award 2005
- Sophie International film Festival - "NISIMASA" Award, 2006
- The best film - Albanian Film Festival, Tirana, 2006
- The best Director - Albanian Film festival, Tirana, 2006
- The best feature film, drama - Spokane International Film Festival USA, 2006
- Grand Prize - Film festival Cinema des authors in Morocco, 2007
- Best Twenty Five Films in the last twenty five years in Vienna Film Festival.
- TRI DRITARE DHE NJË VARJE 2014
- Postproduction Award, Sarajevo Film Festival
- Sarajevo Film Festival – Cineuropa Award
- Cottbus Film Festival- Germany, Special Mention Award
- Cottbus Film Festival- Germany, Dialogue award for Intercultural Communication.
- Lexembourg City Film Festival Prize de la critique
- Berlin -Cinema for Peace and Justice Award
- Durrës International Film Festival- Golden Gladiator
- Palm Springs International Film Festival - Cinema without borders Award
- Cyprus Film Festival- Best Film Award
- Cyprus Film Festival - Student Jury Award
- Best of Best Award - Washington Film Festival
- Heartland Film Festival - Narrative Feature award Winner
- Festival International du cinema Mediterranean de Montpellier – Critic Award
- Festival International du cinema Mediterranean de Montpellier – Nova Award
- Jerusalem International Film Festival – Best Feature Film Award
- International Crime and Punishment Film Festival - Istanbul –Best Feature Film Award
- Arpa International Film Festival – Best Screenplay
- Thessaloniki International Film Festival – Audience Award
- Roshford Film Festival – Best Feature Film
- Tetouan International Mediterranean Film Festival – Grand Prix of the City of Tetouan
