= List of Croatian films =

A list of films produced in Croatia. For an A-Z list of Croatian films see Category:Croatian films.

== 1910s ==
| Title | Director | Cast | Genre | Notes |
|---|---|---|---|---|
1910
| Sokolski slet | Josip Karaman | | Documentary | |
1911
1912
1913
1914
1915
1916
1917
| Brcko in Zagreb (Brcko u Zagrebu) | Arsen Maas | Stjepan Bojničić, Irna Polak | Comedy | First Croatian fictional film, now considered lost |
| Matija Gubec | Aca Binički | | | |
1918
1919
| Jeftina ošta | Arnošt Grund | Ignjat Borštnik | | |
| Brišem i sudim | Arnošt Grund | Ignjat Borštnik | | |
| U lavljem kavezu | Arnošt Grund | | | |
| Kovač raspela | Heinz Hanus | | | |

== 1920s ==
| Title | Director | Cast | Genre | Notes |
|---|---|---|---|---|
1920
| Grička Vještica | Hinko Nunic | Melita Bohinec, Bozo Miller | | |
1921
1922
1923
1924
1925
1926
1927
1928
1929

== 1930s ==
| Title | Director | Cast | Genre | Notes |
|---|---|---|---|---|
1930
1931
1932
1933
1934
1935
1936
1937
| Šešir | Oktavijan Miletić | | Comedy | First Croatian sound film |
1938
1939

== 1940s ==
| Title | Director | Cast | Genre | Notes |
|---|---|---|---|---|
1940
1941
1942
1943
| Agram, die Hauptstadt Kroatiens | Oktavijan Miletić | | Short | |
| Tamburica | | | Documentary | |
1944
| Radium - izvor zraka | Oktavijan Miletić | Marija Crnobori | Short | |
| Lisinski | Oktavijan Miletić | | Biographical | |
1945
1946
1947
| Živjeće Ovaj Narod / This People Will Live | Nikola Popović | Vera Ilić, Siniša Ravasi, Fran Novaković, Carka Jovanović, Miša Mirković, Nikola Popović | | |
1948
1949
| Zastava / The Flag | Branko Marjanović | Sonja Kastl, Marijan Lovrić, Joža Gregorin, Antun Nalis | | |

== 1950s ==
- List of Croatian films of the 1950s

== 1960s ==
- List of Croatian films of the 1960s

== 1970s ==
- List of Croatian films of the 1970s

== 1980s ==
- List of Croatian films of the 1980s

| Title | Director | Cast | Genre | Notes |
|---|---|---|---|---|
1980
1981
| Ritam zločina | Zoran Tadić | Ivica Vidović, Fabijan Šovagović | Drama | |
1982
1983
1984
| Tajna starog tavana (The Secret of the Old Attic) | Vladimir Tadej | Špiro Guberina, Boris Dvornik, Mia Oremović, Jan Kanyza, Miloš Kopecky, Petar Jelaska, Edo Peročević, Mario Mirković, Jiri Guriča, Nina Petrović | Children's film | |
1985
1986
1987
| Osuđeni | Zoran Tadić | Rade Šerbedžija, Ivo Gregurević, Boris Buzančić | Drama | |
1988
| Sokol Did Not Love Him (Sokol ga nije volio) | Branko Schmidt | Fabijan Šovagović | War drama | Based on the play by Fabijan Šovagović, it was the first Yugoslav movie to deal with the 1945 Yugoslav pursuit of Nazi collaborators |
| Život sa stricem | Krsto Papić | Ivo Gregurević | Drama | Based on the novel by Ivan Aralica |
1989
| Čovjek koji je volio sprovode | Zoran Tadić | Fabijan Šovagović, Rade Šerbedžija | | Written by Dubravko Jelačić Bužimski |

== 1990s ==
| Title | Director | Cast | Genre | Notes |
|---|---|---|---|---|
1990
| Captain America | Albert Pyun | Matt Salinger, Ronny Cox, Ned Beatty, Darren McGavin, Michael Nouri, Melinda Dillon, Kim Gillingham, Scott Paulin | Superhero | American-Yugoslav-Croatian co-production |
| Ljeto za sjećanje (A Summer to Remember) | Bruno Gamulin | Branislav Lečić, Suzana Nikolić, Luka Milas, Dora Lipovčan, Milka Podrug-Kokotović, Fabijan Šovagović, Zvonko Torjanac, Danko Ljuština, Kruno Šarić, Relja Bašić | Mystery | Zagreb film |
| Stela | Petar Krelja | Anja Šovagović-Despot, Žarko Laušević, Mira Furlan, Miodrag Krivokapić, Davor Janjić, Ivo Gregurević, Zijad Gračić, Ivan Goran Vitez, Zlatko Vitez, Vanja Matujec, Tomica Milanovski, Ilija Ivezić, Slobodan Milovanović, Eta Bortolazzi | Drama | |
| Eagle (Orao) | Zoran Tadić | Vlatko Dulić, Zdenko Jelčić, Božidar Orešković, Ivica Vidović, Ljiljana Blagojević, Gordana Gadžić, Renata Ćurković, Ksenija Pajić, Fabijan Šovagović | Drama | |
| Karneval, anđeo i prah (Carnival, Angel and Dust) | Antun Vrdoljak | Boris Dvornik, Ivica Vidović, Tonko Lonza, Ena Begović, Žarko Potočnjak, Zvonimir Zoričić, Danko Ljuština, Alen Liverić, Milka Podrug-Kokotović, Bernarda Oman, Marija Kohn, Asja Potočnjak, Siniša Popović, Rade Šerbedžija | | |
| Školjka šumi (The Murmur of the Shell) | Miroslav Međimorec | Sven Lasta, Josip Genda, Špiro Guberina, Slavica Jukić, Ivan Lovriček | | |
1991
| Čaruga | Rajko Grlić | Ivo Gregurević | | Based on the novel by Ivan Kušan about bandit Jovo Stanisavljević Čaruga |
| Đuka Begović | Branko Schmidt | Slobodan Ćustić | | Zagreb Film/HRT |
| Fragments: Chronicle of a Vanishing (Krhotine - Kronika jednog nestajanja) | Zrinko Ogresta | Filip Šovagović | | |
| Priča iz Hrvatske | Krsto Papić | Ivo Gregurević | | |
| The Time of Warriors (Vrijeme ratnika) | Dejan Šorak | Josip Genda, Kruno Šarić | Thriller | |
| Hrvatske katedrale | Hrvoje Hribar | Rene Medvešek | | |
1992
| Luka | Tomislav Radić | Ivo Gregurević | | Based on a novel by Antun Šoljan |
| Baka bijela | Stijepo Mijović-Kočan | Maroja Aleksić | | |
| Kamenita vrata | Ante Babaja | | | |
1993
| Kontesa Dora | Zvonimir Berković | | | |
| Vrijeme za... | Oja Kodar | | | |
| Zlatne godine | Davor Žmegač | | | |
1994
| Cijena života | Bogdan Žižić | | | |
| Svaki put kad se rastajemo | Lukas Nola | | | |
| Vukovar se vraća kući | Branko Schmidt | | | |
| Between Zaghlul and Zaharias | Hrvoje Hribar | Relja Bašić, Branko Brezovac, Ksenija Marinković, Dario Marković | | |
1995
| Anđele moj dragi | Tomislav Radić | | | |
| Gospa | Jakov Sedlar | | | |
| Washed Out (Isprani) | Zrinko Ogresta | | Drama | |
| Nausikaja | Vicko Ruić | | | |
| Osveta je moja | Lordan Zafranović | | | |
| Putovanje tamnom polutkom | Davor Žmegač | | | |
1996
| Djed i baka se rastaju | Zvonimir Ilijić | | | |
| Izgubljeno blago | Darko Vernić-Bundi | | | |
| Kako je počeo rat na mom otoku | Vinko Brešan | | Comedy | |
| Kalvarija | Zvonimir Maycug | | | |
| Ne zaboravi me | Jakov Sedlar | | | |
| Prepoznavanje | Snježana Tribuson | | | |
| Sedma kronika | Bruno Gamulin | | | |
1997
| Božić u Beču | Branko Schmidt | | | |
| Mondo Bobo | Goran Rušinović | | | |
| Pont Neuf | Željko Senečić | | | |
| Puška za uspavljivanje | Hrvoje Hribar | | | |
| Rusko meso | Lukas Nola | | | |
| Treća žena | Zoran Tadić | | | |
1998
| Agonija | Jakov Sedlar | | | |
| Kad mrtvi zapjevaju | Krsto Papić | | | |
| Kanjon opasnih igara | Vladimir Tadej | | | |
| Transatlantic | Mladen Juran | | | |
| The Three Men of Melita Žganjer (Tri muškarca Melite Žganjer) | Snježana Tribuson | | | |
| Zavaravanje | Željko Senečić | | | |
1999
| Madonna (Bogorodica) | Neven Hitrec | | | |
| Crvena prašina | Zrinko Ogresta | | | |
| Četverored | Jakov Sedlar | | | Centres on the Bleiburg death marches |
| Da mi je biti morski pas | Ognjen Sviličić | | | |
| Dubrovački suton | Željko Senečić | | | |
| Garcia | Dejan Šorak | | | |
| Marshal Tito's Spirit (Maršal) | Vinko Brešan | | Comedy | |

== 2000s ==
| Title | Director | Cast | Genre | Notes |
|---|---|---|---|---|
2000
| Cashier Wants to Go to the Seaside (Blagajnica hoće ići na more) | Dalibor Matanić | | | |
| Celestial Body (Nebo, sateliti) | Lukas Nola | | War drama | |
| Is It Clear, My Friend? (Je li jasno, prijatelju?) | Dejan Aćimović | | | |
| Ne daj se, Floki | Zoran Tadić | | | |
| The Old Oak Blues (Srce nije u modi) | Branko Schmidt | | | |
2001
| Ante se vraća kući | Ognjen Sviličić | | | |
| Go, Yellow (Ajmo žuti!) | Dražen Žarković | | Comedy-drama | |
| The Miroslav Holding Co. (Holding) | Tomislav Radić | | | |
| Kraljica noći | Branko Schmidt | | | |
| Polagana predaja | Bruno Gamulin | | | |
| The Last Will (Posljednja volja) | Zoran Sudar | | | |
| Sami | Lukas Nola | | | |
2002
| Fine Dead Girls (Fine mrtve djevojke) | Dalibor Matanić | | Drama | |
| God Forbid a Worse Thing Should Happen (Ne dao bog većeg zla) | Snježana Tribuson | | Drama | |
| Josephine | Rajko Grlić | | | Never released to theatres. |
| Potonulo groblje | Mladen Juran | | | |
| Winter in Rio (Prezimiti u Riju) | Davor Žmegač | | | |
| Serafin, svjetioničarev sin | Vicko Ruić | | | |
| Sjećanje na Georgiju | Jakov Sedlar | | | |
2003
| Infekcija | Krsto Papić | | | |
| Ispod crte | Petar Krelja | | | |
| Horseman (Konjanik) | Branko Ivanda | | | |
| Milost mora | Jakov Sedlar, Dominik Sedlar | | | |
| The One Who Will Stay Unnoticed (Onaj koji će ostati neprimijećen) | Zvonimir Jurić | | Drama | |
| Sretno dijete | Igor Mirković | | | |
| Witnesses (Svjedoci) | Vinko Brešan | | | |
| Svjetsko čudovište | Goran Rušinović | | | |
| Tu | Zrinko Ogresta | | | |
2004
| Djevojčica s olovkama | | Dalibor Matanić | Family | |
| Long Dark Night (Duga mračna noć) | Antun Vrdoljak | Goran Višnjić | War drama | |
| 100 Minutes of Glory (Sto minuta Slave) | Dalibor Matanić | Sanja Vejnović, Miki Manojlović, Vili Matula | Drama | |
| Oprosti za kung fu | Ognjen Sviličić | | | |
| A Wonderful Night in Split (Ta divna splitska noć) | Arsen Anton Ostojić | | Drama | |
2005
| Dva igrača s klupe | Dejan Šorak | | | |
| Lopovi prve klase | Fadil Hadžić | | | |
| Pušća Bistra | Filip Šovagović | | | |
| Sex, piće i krvoproliće | Boris T. Matić, Antonio Nuić, Zvonimir Jurić | | | |
| Snivaj, zlato moje | Neven Hitrec | | | Entered into the 28th Moscow International Film Festival |
| What Is a Man Without a Moustache? | Hrvoje Hribar | | Comedy | |
| What Iva Recorded (Što je Iva snimila 21. listopada 2003.) | Tomislav Radić | | Drama | |
2006
| All for Free (Sve džaba) | Antonio Nuić | Rakan Rushaidat, Nataša Janjić, Emir Hadžihafizbegović, Franjo Dijak, Bojan Navojec, Enis Bešlagić, Sergej Trifunović, Bogdan Diklić, Darija Lorenci, Pero Kvrgić | | |
| The Border Post (Karaula) | Rajko Grlić | | | |
| The Ghost in the Swamp (Duh u močvari) | Branko Ištvančić | Ivo Gregurević, Dejan Aćimović, Mladen Vulić, Vlatko Dulić | Children's film | |
| I Love You (Volim te) | Dalibor Matanić | | Drama | |
| Libertas | Veljko Bulajić | Sven Medvešek, Sandra Ceccarelli, Goran Grgić, Maro Martinović, Žarko Potočnjak, Urša Raukar, Mladen Vulić, Radko Polič, Vanja Drach, Livio Badurina, Ljubomir Kerekeš, Barbara Nola, Biserka Ipša, Željko Vukmirica | | |
| The Melon Route (Put lubenica) | Branko Schmidt | Krešimir Mikić, Leon Lučev, Emir Hadžihafizbegović, Ivo Gregurević, Zijah Sokolović | | |
| Tressette: A Story of an Island (Trešeta) | Dražen Žarković | | | |
2007
| Armin | Ognjen Sviličić | | Drama | |
| The Recollection Thief (Kradljivac uspomena) | Vicko Ruić | Nikša Kušelj, Sven Medvešek | | |
| I Have to Sleep, My Angel (Moram spavat anđele) | Dejan Aćimović | | | |
| Play Me a Love Song (Pjevajte nešto ljubavno) | Goran Kulenović | Ivan Herceg, Ivan Đuričić, Ivan Glowatzky, Hrvoje Kečkeš, Enes Vejzović, Olga Pakalović, Žarko Potočnjak, Helena Buljan, Damir Lončar, Ksenija Marinković, Robert Ugrina, Hana Hegedušić, Stojan Matavulj | | |
| True Miracle (Pravo čudo) | Lukas Nola | | | |
| The Living and the Dead (Živi i mrtvi) | Kristijan Milić | | | |
2008
| The Blacks (Crnci) | Zvonimir Jurić, Goran Dević | | War film | |
| Buick Riviera | Goran Rušinović | Slavko Štimac, Leon Lučev | Drama | |
| Iza stakla | Zrinko Ogresta | | | |
| Kino Lika | Dalibor Matanić | | | |
| Ničiji sin | Arsen Anton Ostojić | | Drama | |
| Will Not End Here (Nije kraj) | Vinko Brešan | | | |
| Tri priče o nespavanju | Tomislav Radić | | | |
| Zapamtite Vukovar | Fadil Hadžić | | | |
2009
| Donkey (Kenjac) | Antonio Nuić | | | |
| The Man Under the Table (Čovjek ispod stola) | Neven Hitrec | | | |
| Metastases (Metastaze) | Branko Schmidt | Rene Bitorajac | Drama | |

== 2010s ==
| Title | Director | Cast | Genre | Notes |
|---|---|---|---|---|
2010
| 72 Days (72 dana) | Danilo Šerbedžija | Rade Šerbedžija, Bogdan Diklić, Krešimir Mikić, Živko Anočić | Drama | |
| Forest Creatures (Šuma summarum) | Ivan-Goran Vitez | Vili Matula, Hana Hegedušić, Ljubiša Savanović, Nataša Dangubić | | |
| Just Between Us (Neka ostane među nama) | Rajko Grlić | | Drama | |
| Mother of Asphalt (Majka asfalta) | Dalibor Matanić | Marija Škaričić, Janko Popović Volarić, Krešimir Mikić | Drama | |
| The Show Must Go On | Nevio Marasović | Sven Medvešek, Nataša Dorčić | Science fiction drama | |
| Some Other Stories (Neke druge priče) | Ivona Juka (segment "Hrvatska priča"), Ana Marija Rosi (segment "Srpska priča"), Ines Tanović (segment "Bosanskohercegovačka priča"), Marija Džidževa (segment "Makedonska prikazna"), Hanna Slak (segment "Slovenska zgodba") | | | This film is in a coproduction of Croatia, Serbia, Bosnia and Herzegovina, Republic of Macedonia and Slovenia. |
| Two Sunny Days (2 sunčana dana) | Ognjen Sviličić | Maya Sansa, Bristol Pomeroy, Leon Lučev, Sylvia Kristel | Drama | |
2011
| 7 seX 7 | Irena Škorić | Ana Majhenić, Robert Kurbaša, Jelena Perčin | Erotic drama | |
| Blurs (Fleke) | Aldo Tardozzi | | Drama | |
| Josef | Stanislav Tomić | | War film | |
| Koko and the Ghosts (Koko i duhovi) | Daniel Kušan | | Children's film | |
| Kotlovina | Tomislav Radić | | Drama | |
| The Little Gypsy Witch (Duh babe Ilonke) | Tomislav Žaja | | Fantasy | |
2012
| Accidental Passer-by (Slučajni prolaznik) | Jozo Patljak | | | |
| Flower Square (Cvjetni trg) | Krsto Papić | | | |
| Halima's Path (Halimin put) | Arsen Anton Ostojić | | Drama | |
| Hives (Košnice) | Boaz Debby, Michael Lennox, Simon Dolensky, Tomás Kratochvíl, Igor Šeregi | Akbar Kurtha, Stefan Lampadius, Luboš Veselý, Nili Tserruya, Ozren Grabaric | Drama, Comedy | |
| Lea and Darija (Lea i Darija) | Branko Ivanda | | Drama | |
| A Letter to My Father (Pismo ćaći) | Damir Čučić | | Drama | |
| Night Boats (Noćni brodovi) | Igor Mirković | Ana Karić, Radko Polič, Lana Barić, Pero Kvrgić | Drama | |
| No Laughing Allowed (Zabranjeno smijanje) | Davor Žmegač | | | |
| Sonja and the Bull (Sonja i bik) | Vlatka Vorkapić | | | |
| Vegetarian Cannibal (Ljudožder vegetarijanac) | Branko Schmidt | | Drama | |
2013
| Cowboys (Kauboji) | Tomislav Mršić | | Comedy | |
| Handymen (Majstori) | Dalibor Matanić | Areta Ćurković, Nikša Butijer, Goran Bogdan, Bojan Navojec | Comedy | |
| Hush (Šuti) | Lukas Nola | Tihana Lazović, Živko Anočić, Lana Barić, Milan Pleština, Ksenija Pajić, Ksenija Marinković, Bojan Navojec, Enes Vejzović, Ivo Gregurević | Drama | |
| The Mysterious Boy (Zagonetni dječak) | Dražen Žarković | Antonio Parač, Karlo Maloča, Toma Budanko, Vanja Markovinović, Filip Ružić, Nina Mileta | Children's film | |
| The Priest's Children (Svećenikova djeca) | Vinko Brešan | | Comedy | |
| Projections (Projekcije) | Zrinko Ogresta | Jelena Miholjević, Bojan Navojec, Polona Juh | Drama | |
| A Stranger (Obrana i zaštita) | Bobo Jelčić | Bogdan Diklić, Nada Đurevska | Drama | |
| Vis-à-Vis | Nevio Marasović | Rakan Rushaidat, Janko Popović-Volarić, Krešimir Mikić, Daria Lorenci | Drama | |
2014
| The Bridge at the End of the World (Most na kraju svijeta) | Branko Ištvančić | Aleksandar Bogdanović, Sanja Radišić, Boro Stjepanović, Vlatko Dulić, Nela Kocsis, Slobodan Ćustić, Miralem Zupčević, Slaven Knezović, Jelena Perčin, Nikša Kušelj | Drama | |
| The Little Gypsy Witch (Duh babe Ilonke) | Tomislav Žaja | Selma Ibrahimi, Marin Arman Grbin, Rakan Rushaidat, Aleksandra Balmazović, Sabina Ajrula, Krunoslav Šarić | Children's film | |
| Love or Death (Ljubav ili smrt) | Daniel Kušan | Antonio Parač, Kristian Bonačić, Vanja Markovinović, Nina Mileta, Filip Mayer, Tesa Litvan, Tara Thaller, Korana Ugrina, Marin Stević, Ilijana Knežević | Children's film | |
| Number 55 (Broj 55) | Kristijan Milić | Goran Bogdan, Alan Katić | War film | |
| The Reaper (Kosac) | Zvonimir Jurić | Ivo Gregurević, Mirjana Karanović | Drama | |
| These Are the Rules (Takva su pravila) | Ognjen Sviličić | Emir Hadžihafizbegović, Jasna Žalica, Hrvoje Vladisavljević | Drama | |
| The Judgement (-) | Stephan Komandarev | Assen Blatechki | Drama | |
| Monument to Michael Jackson (-) | Darko Lungulov | Boris Milivojevic | Comedy | |
| These Are the Rules (Takva su pravila) | Ognjen Sviličić | Emir Hadžihafizbegović, Jasna Žalica | Drama | |
| No One's Child (-) | Vuk Ršumović | Denis Muric, Pavle Čemerikić | Drama | |
2015
| Belladonna | Dubravka Turić | | Drama | |
| The High Sun (Zvizdan) | Dalibor Matanić | Tihana Lazović | Drama | |
| Life Is a Trumpet (Život je truba) | Antonio Nuić | Bojan Navojec, Iva Babić, Zlatko Vitez, Mirela Brekalo Popović, Goran Navojec, Filip Šovagović, Ksenija Marinković, Filip Križan | Comedy | |
| Shooting Stars (Narodni heroj Ljiljan Vidić) | Ivan-Goran Vitez | | Comedy | |
| Swineherds (Svinjari) | Ivan Livaković | Iva Visković, Marin Radman, Iva Mihalić, Ivana Roščić, Ana Maras, Damir Poljičak, Marina Redžepović, Jasna Bilušić, Nera Stipičević, Senka Bulić, Ljerka Boroša, Jadranka Matković | Comedy | |
| Ungiven (Imena višnje) | Branko Schmidt | Ivo Gregurević, Nada Đurevska, Goran Bogdan | Drama | |
| You Carry Me (Ti mene nosiš) | Ivona Juka | Lana Barić, Vojislav Brajović, Nataša Janjić, Nataša Dorčić | Drama | |
2016
| All the Best (Sve najbolje) | Snježana Tribuson | Ksenija Marinković, Renata Pokupić, Ozren Grabarić, Bogdan Diklić, Goran Navojec, Ksenija Pajić | Comedy-drama | |
| The Constitution (Ustav Republike Hrvatske) | Rajko Grlić | Nebojša Glogovac, Dejan Aćimović, Ksenija Marinković | Drama | |
| Goran | Nevio Marasović | Franjo Dijak, Nataša Janjić, Goran Bogdan, Janko Popović Volarić, Milan Štrljić, Bojan Navojec, Edita Karađole, Filip Križan, Iva Krajnc | Drama | |
| Ministry of Love (Ministarstvo ljubavi) | Pavo Marinković | Stjepan Perić, Ecija Ojdanić | Comedy | |
| On the Other Side (S one strane) | Zrinko Ogresta | Ksenija Marinković, Lazar Ristovski | Drama | |
| Quit Staring at My Plate (Ne gledaj mi u pijat) | Hana Jušić | Mia Petričević, Nikša Butijer, Arijana Čulina, Zlatko Burić | Drama | |
| The Trampoline (Trampolin) | Katarina Zrinka Matijević | Franka Mikolaci, Frano Mašković, Lana Barić, Tena Brankov Nemet, Nina Violić, Marija Tadić, Igor Kovač, Enes Vejzović | Drama | |
| ZG80 | Igor Šeregi | Rene Bitorajac | Action comedy | |
2017
| Agape | Branko Schmidt | Goran Bogdan | Drama | |
| Anka | Dejan Aćimović | Cvita Viljac, Linda Begonja, Eric Cantona, Matea Elezović, Goran Grgić, Nikola Kojo | Children's film | |
| The Avalanche (Lavina) | Stanislav Tomić | Robert Ugrina, Stojan Matavulj, Ksenija Marinković, Ana Maras Harmander, Borko Perić, Žarko Radić, Goran Grgić, Sara Stanić, Nina Violić, Miran Kurspahić, Sven Jakir | Comedy | |
| A Brief Excursion (Kratki izlet) | Igor Bezinović | Ante Zlatko Stolica, Mladen Vujčić, Josip Visković, Željko Beljan, Iva Ivšić, Marko Aksentijević, Martina Burulic | Drama | |
| Dead Fish (Mrtve ribe) | Kristijan Milić | Dragan Despot, Slaven Knezović, Đorđe Kukuljica, Asim Ugljen, Marko Cindrić, Alen Liverić, Armin Omerović, Velibor Topić | Drama | |
| Exorcism (Egzorcizam) | Dalibor Matanić | Marko Braić, Senka Bulić | Drama | |
| Fuck Off I Love You | Anđelo Jurkas | Csilla Barath-Bastaić, Marko Cindrić, Judita Franković | Drama | |
| The Mystery of Green Hill (Uzbuna na zelenom vrhu) | Čejen Černić | Marko Tocilj, Alex Rakoš, Jan Pentek, Tin Gregorić, Jakov Piljek, Lucija Philips, Sara Čolaković, Toma Serdarević, Dora Bilić, Dijana Vidušin, Ozren Grabarić | Children's film | |
2018
| Aleksi | Barbara Vekarić | Tihana Lazović, Jason Mann, Sebastian Cavazza, Goran Marković, Neda Arnerić, Aljoša Vučković | Drama | Winner - Best Feature Film - 2019 New Jersey International Film Festival |
| All Alone (Sam samcat) | Bobo Jelčić | Rakan Rushaidat, Miki Manojlović, Snježana Sinovčić Šiškov, Lea Breyer | Drama | |
| Comic Sans | Nevio Marasović | Janko Popović Volarić, Zlatko Burić | Comedy-drama | |
| Deep Cuts (Duboki rezovi) | Dubravka Turić, Filip Mojzeš, Filip Peruzović | Lana Barić, Roko Glavina, Milivoj Beader, Nikša Butijer, Franko Jakovčević, Areta Ćurković, Glorija Pinturić, Lily Antić, Jadranka Đokić, Borna Fadljević, Živko Anočić, Vinko Kraljević, Marina Redžepović, Mirela Brekalo, Bernard Perić | Drama | |
| The Eighth Commissioner (Osmi povjerenik) | Ivan Salaj | Frano Mašković, Ivo Gregurević, Borko Perić, Filip Šovagović, Špiro Guberina | Comedy-drama | |
| F20 | Arsen Anton Ostojić | Filip Mayer, Romina Tonković, Mladen Vulić | Drama | |
| Mali | Antonio Nuić | Franjo Dijak, Vito Dijak, Iva Babić, Ksenija Marinković, Rakan Rushaidat, Hrvoje Kečkeš, Bojan Navojec, Robert Ugrina, Živko Anočić, Paško Vukasović | Drama | |
| What a Country! (Koja je ovo država) | Vinko Brešan | Daniel Olbrychski, Sebastian Cavazza, Goran Grgić, Zvonimir Sunara, Nikša Butijer | Black comedy | |
2019
| Extracurricular (Dopunska nastava) | Ivan-Goran Vitez | Marina Kostelac, Nadežda Perišić Radović, Petra Vukelić, Frida Jakšić, Ana-Marija Percaić | | |
| General | Antun Vrdoljak | Goran Višnjić, Nataša Janjić | War drama | |
| The Last Serb in Croatia (Posljednji Srbin u Hrvatskoj) | Predrag Ličina | Krešimir Mikić, Hristina Popović, Tihana Lazović | Horror comedy | |
| My Grandpa Is an Alien (Moj dida je pao s Marsa) | Marina Andree Škop, Drazen Žarković | Lana Hranjec, Nils Ole Oftebro | Children's science fiction | |
| The Voice (Glas) | Ognjen Sviličić | Franko Jakovčević, Belma Salkunić, Karla Brbić, Barbara Vicković, Igor Kovač, Goran Bogdan, Stipe Radoja, Josip Lukić | Drama | |

== 2020s ==
| Title | Director | Cast | Genre | Notes |
|---|---|---|---|---|
2020
| Accidental Luxuriance of the Translucent Watery Rebus | Dalibor Barić | Rakan Rushaidat, Ana Vilenica, Frano Mašković | Animation | |
| Tereza37 | Danilo Šerbedžija | Lana Barić | Drama | |
2021
| Murina | Antoneta Alamat Kusijanović | Gracija Filipović, Leon Lučev, Danica Curcic | Drama | 2021 Caméra d'Or winner |
| The Staffroom | Sonja Tarokić | Marina Redžepović, Stojan Matavulj, Nives Ivanković | Drama | 2021 Big_Golden_Arena_for_Best_Film winner |
2022
| Safe Place | Juraj Lerotić | Juraj Lerotić, Goran Marković, Snježana Sinovčić Šiškov | Drama | |
| Sixth Bus | Eduard Galić | Arnaud Humbert, Toni Gojanovic, Marko Petric | War | |
2023
| Bosnian Pot | Pavo Marinković | Senad Bašić, Bruna Bebić, Andreas Kiendl, Birgit Stöger | Comedy-Drama | |
2024
| Beautiful Evening, Beautiful Day | Ivona Juka | Emir Hadžihafizbegović, Elmir Krivalić, Dado Ćosić, Slaven Došlo, Đorđe Galić | Drama | |
| Cat's Cry | Sanja Živković | Jasmin Geljo, Andrijana Đorđević, Sanja Mikitišin, Marija Škaričić, Denis Murić, Sergej Trifunović, Srđan Miletić | Drama | Serbian-Croatian-Canadian coproduction; screenplay by Goran Paskaljević unproduced before his death in 2020 |
| The Man Who Could Not Remain Silent | Nebojša Slijepčević | Dragan Mićanović, Goran Bogdan, Alexis Manenti | Short drama | Winner of the Short Film Palme d'Or at the 2024 Cannes Film Festival |
2025
| Fiume o morte! | Igor Bezinović | | Comedy, documentary, drama | |
| Sandbag Dam (Zečji nasip) | Čejen Černić Čanak | Lav Novosel, Andrija Žunac, Leon Grgić, Franka Mikolaci, Tanja Smoje | Drama | Premiere at the Berlinale 2025. |
2026
| The Wedding | Igor Šeregi | Rene Bitorajac, Dragan Bjelogrlić, Linda Begonja, Vesna Trivalić, Roko Sikavica, Anđelka Stević Žugić, Nika Grbelja, Marko Grabež | Comedy | |
| The Last Roman God | Božidar Domagoj Burić | Amar Bukvić, Nataša Janjić, Slavko Sobin, Marko Cindrić, Krešimir Mikić, Dragan Despot | Historical drama | |
