= Ivo Gregurević =

Croatian actor (1952–2019)

- Born: 7 October 1952; Donja Mahala, PR Bosnia and Herzegovina, FPR Yugoslavia
- Died: 1 January 2019 (aged 66); Zagreb, Croatia
- Education: Academy of Dramatic Art
- Alma mater: University of Zagreb
- Occupation: Actor
- Years active: 1977–2018
- Partner: Dolores Lambaša (2002–2007)
- Children: 1

Ivo Gregurević (pronounced [ivo gr̩egur̩eʋitɕ]; 7 October 1952 – 1 January 2019) was a Croatian film, theatre and television actor. Throughout over a quarter of a century, Gregurević played rural bullies and arrogant nouveau riche, becoming one of Croatia's best-known and most-lauded character actors.

== Biography ==
Born in the village of Donja Mahala, Ivo was the child of Marko and Jela Gregurević. He graduated from the Zagreb Academy of Dramatic Art, and has worked in over 90 movies and television programs since the late 1970s; in particular, he acted in almost all of Croatian movies after gaining independence in 1991. He also had few starring roles, best known being in 1991 film Čaruga. Croatian film director Snježana Tribuson has stated that she had intentionally cast Gregurević in almost all of her movies.

Besides movie roles, he made the successful appearances in popular Croatian TV series, Velo misto, playing the Netjak, and Marko Kosmički in Odmori se, zaslužio si. He has won two Croatian Actors' Association Awards for Šokica (1998) and Duga mračna noć (2006). In 2005 he was ranked second in the Croatian-based film magazine Hollywood in the "Best Croatian Male Movie Stars of All Time" list.

== Personal life ==
Gregurević was in a relationship with Croatian actress Dubravka Ostojić, with whom he had a son Marko, born in 1978. Following their rupture, Gregurević reported he has been in a relationship with the actress Dolores Lambaša. Last years, Gregurević was in a relationship with, to media unknown woman, who works as an inspector with the Croatian Ministry of the Interior.

Gregurević was found dead in his own home in Zagreb on 2 January 2019, but he died the day before. He was 66. He was buried at Karaula Cemetery in his hometown of Donja Mahala, on 8 January.

== Awards and nominations ==
Golden Arena Award

Year	Nominated work	Award	Result
1998	The Three Men of Melita Žganjer	Golden Arena for Best Supporting Actor	Won
1999	Madonna	Golden Arena for Best Actor	Won
2002	Fine Dead Girls	Golden Arena for Best Actor	Won
2005	What Iva Recorded	Golden Arena for Best Actor	Won
2014	The Reaper	Golden Arena for Best Actor	Won

Nagrada Fabijan Šovagović

Year	Group	Award	Result
2015	Lifetime achievement award for contributions in Croatian film	Yearly award	Won

Vladimir Nazor Award

Year	Group	Award	Result
1998	Film art	Yearly award	Won

== Performances ==
=== Films ===
Year	Film	Role	Notes
1977	Don't Lean Out the Window	Filip	
1977	Snowstorm	Ivan	
1979	Osvajanje slobode	Krga	
1979	Usijanje	Rajko	
1980	Lost Homeland	Tona	
1981	High Voltage	Drug Vlado	
1982	Cyclops	Krele	
1983	The Third Key	Marko	
1985	Crveni i crni	Alberto Sikora	
1986	Evening Bells	Đurica	Credited as: Ivo Grgurević
1987	Kraljeva završnica	Alcohol salesman in car	
1987	Osuđeni	Ivo	
1988	My Uncle's Legacy	Drug Radojica	Nominated: Golden Globe Award for Best Foreign Language Film
1988	Sokol Did Not Love Him	Toma	
1989	That Summer of White Roses	The German Captain	Tokyo Grand Prix
1989	Diploma za smrt	Guba	
1989	Povratak Katarine Kožul	Vinko Kozul	
1989	Hamburg Altona	Mrva	
1990	Stela	Tomo Lončar	
1991	Čaruga	Jovo Stanisavljević Čaruga	
1991	Story from Croatia	Luka	
1991	Fragments: Chronicle of a Vanishing	Vinko	
1992	Luka	Slobodan Despot	
1993	Countess Dora		
1994	Vukovar: The Way Home	Boss	
1995	Washed Out	Ivo	
1996	The Seventh Chronicle	Kapo	
1997	Christmas in Vienna	Guest	
1997	Russian Meat	Vuk	
1998	The Three Men of Melita Zganjer	Jura	Golden Arena for Best Supporting Actor
1998	Transatlantic	Saša	
1998	When the Dead Start Singing	Cinco Kapulica	
1999	Madonna	Rade	Golden Arena for Best Actor
1999	Marshal Tito's Spirit	Luka	
1999	Red Dust	Kirby	
1999	Četverored	Kapetan Rasa	
2000	Is It Clear, My Friend?	Slaviša	Credited as: Ivo Gregureviæ
2000	Milky Way	Službenik	
2000	The Old Oak Blues	Ante	
2000	Celestial Body	Škaričić	
2001	Alone		
2001	The Last Will	Mato	
2001	Queen of the Night	Emil	
2001	The Miroslav Holding Co.	Šušnjara	
2002	Fine Dead Girls	Branko	Golden Arena for Best Actor
2002	Serafim, the Lighthouse Keeper's Son	Serafim's father	
2003	Here	Boris	
2003	Witnesses	Father	
2003	Infection	Muller	
2003	Below the Line	Mate Vranar	
2004	Long Dark Night	Major	
2005	What Iva Recorded	Božo	Golden Arena for Best Actor
2005	What Is a Man Without a Moustache?	Marinko	
2005	Pod vedrim nebom	Nasilnik	Short film
2005	Posljednja pričest	Darko	Short film
2006	The Melon Route	Ćale	
2006	The Ghost in the Swamp	Vučević	
2007	Konji vrani	Vavan	
2007	Pravo čudo	President	
2007	Kradljivac uspomena		
2008	The Lika Cinema	Joso	
2009	The Blacks	Ivo	
2009	Metastases	Filip's dad	
2009	Ta tvoja ruka mala	Mister	
2011	Josef	Muđibar	
2011	Ćaća	Ćaća	
2011	Room 304	Nebojša	
2012	Sonja and the Bull	Ante's dad	
2013	Šuti	Zdenko	
2013	The Brave Adventures of a Little Shoemaker	Boss	
2014	The Reaper	Ivo	Golden Arena for Best Actor
2015	Imena višnje	Slavko	
2016	The Final Barrier	Slavko	
2016	Sve najbolje	Matko	
2017	Men Don't Cry	Josip	
2017	Agape	Bishop Anić	
2017	Catalina	Father	
2018	Osmi povjerenik	Tonino's father	
2018	Za ona dobra stara vremena	Emil	
2019	General		Post-production, last film

=== Television ===
Year	Series	Role	Notes
1978	Oko	Iva	TV movie
1978	Slučaj Filipa Franjića		TV movie
1978	Mačak pod šljemom	Repica	TV series, 5 episodes
1979	Djavolje sjeme	Pavle	
1979	Knjiga drugova		TV movie
1979	Liberanovi		TV movie
1979	Gradilište	Miloje	TV movie
1980-1981	Velo misto	Nećak	TV series, 10 episodes
1981	Duvanski put	Rajko	Mini series, 3 episodes
1982	Nepokoreni grada	Professor Hrastinski	TV series, episode: Čovjek u sjeni
1983	Hildegard	Đuro	TV movie
1983	Kiklop	Đuro	Mini series, 2 episodes
1983	Zamke	Martin	TV series, 4 episodes
1983	Rade Končar		TV series
1984	Veliki talenat	Mišo Krunić	TV movie
1984	Jedan cijeli ljudski vijek		TV movie
1984	Duet za jednu noć		TV movie
1985	Brisani prostor	Stimer	3 episodes
1985	Hajdučki gaj	Franjesa	TV series, 3 episodes
1986	Dosije		Episode: Pad
1986	Smogovci		TV series, episode: Maturanti i zafrkanti
1987	Terevenka		TV movie
1988	Ciao, ciao bambina	Mile	TV movie
1988	Večernja zvona	Đurica	TV series, 4 episodes
1988	Gospodski život Stipe Zvonarova	Stipe Zvonarov	TV movie
1988	Bez trećeg	Marko	TV movie
1989	Ptice nebeske	Gavrić	Mini series, episode: Geometri
1989	Leo i Brigita	Inspector	TV movie
1990	Operacija Barbarossa	Mirko's dad	TV series, episode: Pogled unatrag
1990	Lude gljive		TV movie
1990	Doktorova noć	Forest ranger	TV movie
1993	I dok je srca, bit će i Kroacije!	Ivo Andrić	TV movie
1993	Dok nitko ne gleda		TV movie
1994	Each Time We Part Away	Melita's husband	TV movie
1995	Olovna pričest		TV movie
1995	Mrtva točka	Ante	TV movie
1996	Sokica		TV movie
1996	Prepoznavanje	Plainclothes policeman	TV movie
1996	Djed i baka se rastaju	Branimir	TV movie
1997	Komedijice	Božo Ivić / Generalni Direktor	2 episodes
2000	Crna kronika ili dan žena	President Runolista	TV movie
2001	Go, Yellow	Usljebrk	TV movie
2002	Novo doba	Jure Čular	Episode: Čudo
2002	Naši i vaši	Dr. Jozo	Episode: Mirovina
2004	Zlatni vrč	Doctor	TV series, 2 episodes
2004–2006	Crna hronika	Mate Bošnjak 'Šampion'	TV series, 52 episodes, 1 voice episode
2005	Duga mračna noć	Major	TV series, 13 episodes
2005	Otac	Father	TV movie
2005	Odmori se, zaslužio si Christmas Special	Marko Kosmički	TV movie
2006	Ne pitaj kako!	Abas	TV movie
2006	Klopka	Mate Bošnjak 'Šampion'	TV series, 17 episodes
2006–2013	Odmori se, zaslužio si	Marko Kosmički	TV series, 72 episodes
2006–2007	Tata i zetovi	Daut	TV series, 22 episodes
2008–2009	Mamutica	Chief Pavković	TV series, 17 episodes
2009	Goose Feather	Vavan	TV series, 2 episodes
2008–2011	Stipe u gostima	Marko Kosmički	TV series, 3 episodes
2010	Periferija city	Piljo Kamenić	TV series, 14 episodes
2010	Tito	Joseph Stalin	Mini series, 4 episodes
2011	Provodi i sprovodi	Vlado Deronja	TV series, episode: Od kolijevke pa do groba sve je generalna proba
2012	Nedjeljom ujutro, subotom navečer	Nedjeljković	TV series, 9 episodes
2013–2014	Zora dubrovačka	Tonko Šimunović	TV series, 21 episodes
2014–2015	Budva na pjeni od mora	Mile Kovač	TV series, 10 episodes
2016	Patrola na cesti	Don Anđelko	TV series, 3 episodes
2016	Dobrodosli u Orient Express	Soldo	TV series, episode:Kada Ornela spasava stvar
2017	Čuvar dvorca	Boris Bišćan	TV series, 4 episodes
2018	Počivali u miru	Pavle Rešetar	TV series, 5 episodes
2018	Velikani hrvatskog glumišta	Himself	TV documentary series

=== Music videos ===
Year	Video	Artist	Notes
2000	Lijepa li si	Thompson	Cameo
