= Golden Arena for Best Screenplay =

- Country: Yugoslavia (1955–1990); Croatia (1992–present)
- Presented by: Pula Film Festival Jury
- First award: 1955
- Currently held by: Sandra Antolić; Branko Schmidt; Ognjen Sviličić
- Website: Official Website

The following is a list of winners of the Golden Arena for Best Screenplay at the Pula Film Festival.

== List of winners ==
The following is a list of winners of the Golden Arena for Best Screenplay at the Pula Film Festival.

=== Yugoslav competition (1955–1990) ===
Year	Winner	English title	Original title
1955	Slavko Janevski		Vučja noć
1956	Ratko Đurović		Zle pare
1957	Slavko Kolar	Master of His Own Body	Svoga tela gospodar
1958	Zvonimir Berković (co-winner)	H-8	H-8
1958	Tomislav Butorac (co-winner)	H-8	H-8
1959	Veljko Bulajić (co-winner)	Train Without a Timetable	Vlak bez voznog reda
1959	Ivo Braut (co-winner)	Train Without a Timetable	Vlak bez voznog reda
1959	Stjepan Perović (co-winner)	Train Without a Timetable	Vlak bez voznog reda
1959	Elio Petri (co-winner)	Train Without a Timetable	Vlak bez voznog reda
1960	Zora Dirnbach	The Ninth Circle	Deveti krug
1961	Dragoslav Ilić (co-winner)	Boom Town	Uzavreli grad
1961	Radenko Ostojić (co-winner)	Boom Town	Uzavreli grad
1961	Veljko Bulajić (2) (co-winner)	Boom Town	Uzavreli grad
1963	Arsen Diklić		Radopolje
1964	Ivan Ribič	Don't Cry, Peter	Ne joči, Peter
1966	Zvonimir Berković (2) (shared)	Rondo	Rondo
1966	Simon Drakul (shared)		Do pobjede i dalje
1967	Puriša Đorđević		Jutro
1968	Branimir Šćepanović		Pre istine
1969	Staša Borisavljević	Downstream from the Sun	Nizvodno od sunca
1970	Puriša Đorđević (2)	The Cyclists	Biciklisti
1971	Miroslav Antić		Doručak sa đavolom
1972	Slavko Janevski (2) (co-winner)		Makedonskiot del od pekolot
1972	Pande Toškovski (co-winner)		Makedonskiot del od pekolot
1972	Vatroslav Mimica (co-winner)		Makedonskiot del od pekolot
1973	Branimir Šćepanović (2)	The Battle of Sutjeska	Sutjeska
1974	Branko Šomen		Let mrtve ptice
1975	Arsen Diklić (2) (co-winner)	Wintering in Jacobsfeld	Zimovanje u Jakobsfeldu
1975	Branko Bauer (co-winner)	Wintering in Jacobsfeld	Zimovanje u Jakobsfeldu
1976	Zdravko Velimirović (co-winner)	The Peaks of Zelengora	Vrhovi Zelengore
1976	Mladen Oljača (co-winner)	The Peaks of Zelengora	Vrhovi Zelengore
1976	Đurica Labović (co-winner)	The Peaks of Zelengora	Vrhovi Zelengore
1977	Slavko Goldstein (co-winner)	Operation Stadium	Akcija stadion
1977	Dušan Vukotić (co-winner)	Operation Stadium	Akcija stadion
1978	Dragoslav Mihailović		Aller retour
1979	Petrit Imami		Era e Lisi
1980	Puriša Đorđević (3)		Osam kila sreće
1981	Abdulah Sidran	Do You Remember Dolly Bell?	Sjećaš li se Dolly Bell?
1982	Mirza Idrizović	The Smell of Quinces	Miris dunja
1983	Živojin Pavlović (co-winner)	Body Scent	Zadah tela
1983	Slobodan Golubović (co-winner)	Body Scent	Zadah tela
1984	Branko Gradišnik		Leta odlučitve
1985	Abdulah Sidran (2)	When Father Was Away on Business	Otac na službenom putu
1986	Gordan Mihić	Happy New Year '49	Srećna nova '49.
1987	Dejan Šorak	Officer with a Rose	Oficir s ružom
1988	Žarko Dragojević		Kuća pored pruge
1989	Dušan Kovačević	The Meeting Point	Sabirni centar
1990	Ferenc Deak		Granica

=== Croatian competition (1992–present) ===
Year	Winner	English title	Original title
1991	Festival was not held.		
1992	Lada Kaštelan (co-winner)	Fragments: Chronicle of a Vanishing	Krhotine
1992	Zrinko Ogresta (co-winner)	Fragments: Chronicle of a Vanishing	Krhotine
1993	Zvonimir Berković (3)	Countess Dora	Kontesa Dora
1994	Festival was not held.		
1995	Lukas Nola	Each Time We Part Away	Svaki put kad se rastajemo
1996	Nino Škrabe		Ne zaboravi me
1997	Branko Schmidt	Christmas in Vienna	Božić u Beču
1998	Snježana Tribuson	The Three Men of Melita Žganjer	Tri muškarca Melite Žganjer
1999	Zrinko Ogresta (2) (co-winner)	Red Dust	Crvena prašina
1999	Goran Tribuson (co-winner)	Red Dust	Crvena prašina
2000	Ivo Brešan (co-winner)	Marshal Tito's Spirit	Maršal
2000	Vinko Brešan (co-winner)	Marshal Tito's Spirit	Maršal
2001	Josip Cvenić	Queen of the Night	Kraljica noći
2002	Goran Tribuson (2)	God Forbid a Worse Thing Should Happen	Ne dao bog većeg zla
2003	Jurica Pavičić (co-winner)	Witnesses	Svjedoci
2003	Živko Zalar (co-winner)	Witnesses	Svjedoci
2004	Antun Vrdoljak	Long Dark Night	Duga mračna noć
2005	Dejan Šorak (2)	Two Players from the Bench	Dva igrača s klupe
2006	Antonio Nuić	All for Free	Sve džaba
2007	Ognjen Sviličić	Armin	Armin
2008	Goran Rušinović (co-winner)	Buick Riviera	Buick Riviera
2008	Miljenko Jergović (co-winner)	Buick Riviera	Buick Riviera
2009	Antonio Nuić (2)	Donkey	Kenjac
2010	Nevio Marasović	The Show Must Go On	The Show Must Go On
2011	Tomislav Radić		Kotlovina
2012	Vlatka Vorkapić	Sonja and the Bull	Sonja i bik
2013	Bobo Jelčić	A Stranger	Obrana i zaštita
2014	Ivan Pavličić	Number 55	Broj 55
2015	Josip Mlakić	Ungiven	Imena višnje
2016	Mate Matišić (co-winner)	On the Other Side	S one strane
2016	Zrinko Ogresta (3) (co-winner)	On the Other Side	S one strane
2017	Rajko Grlić (co-winner)	The Constitution	Ustav Republike Hrvatske
2017	Ante Tomić (co-winner)	The Constitution	Ustav Republike Hrvatske
2018	Sara Hribar	Lada Kamenski	Lada Kamenski
2019	Mate Matišić (2)	What a Country!	Koja je ovo drzava!
2020	Lana Barić	Tereza37	Tereza37
2021	Sandra Antolić (co-winner)	Once We Were Good for You	A bili smo vam dobri
2021	Branko Schmidt (2) (co-winner)	Once We Were Good for You	A bili smo vam dobri
2021	Ognjen Sviličić (2) (co-winner)	Once We Were Good for You	A bili smo vam dobri
2026	Igor Jelinović	Honey Bunny	Koke
