= Ksenija Marinković =

Croatian actress

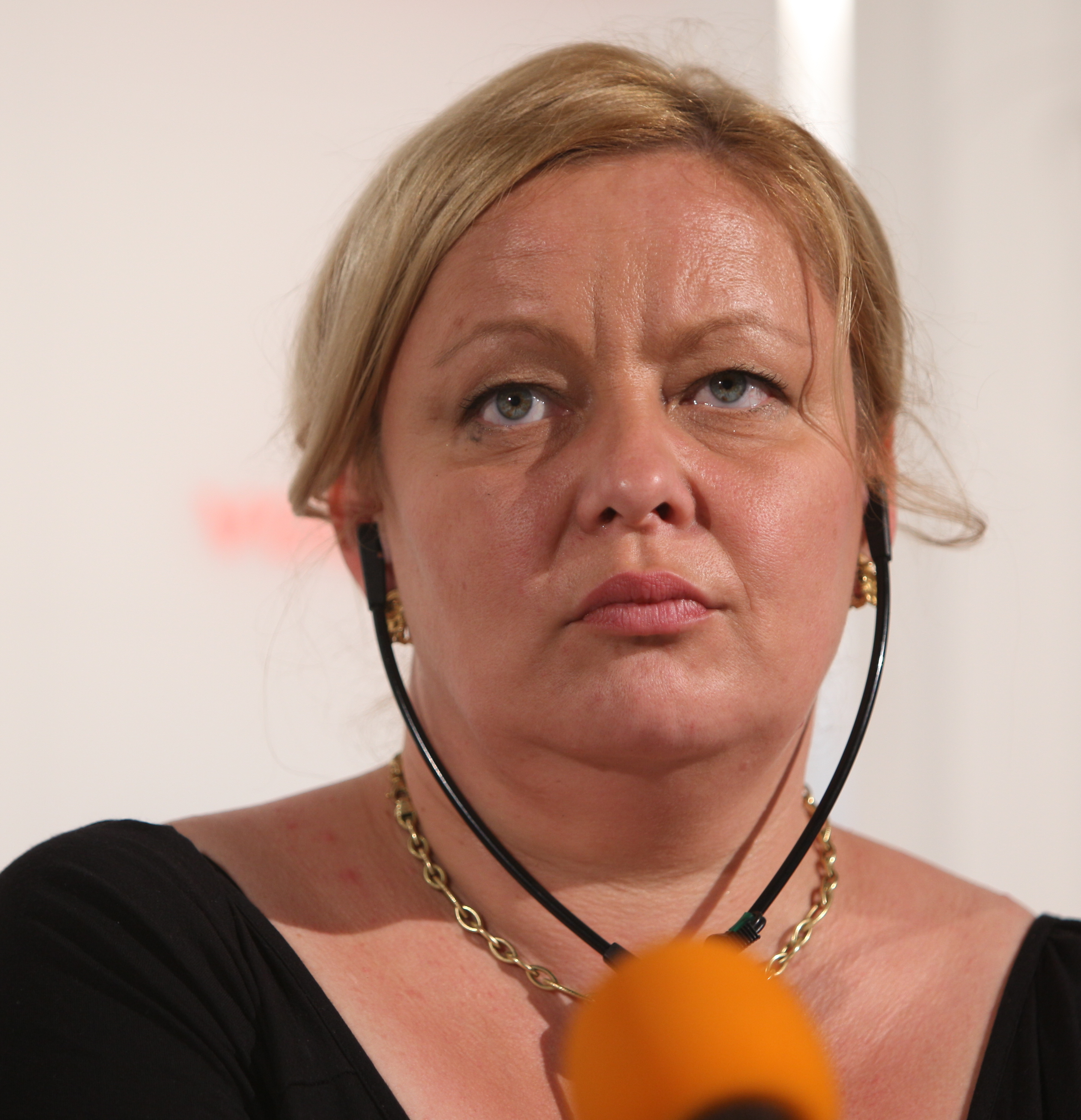
- Born: Ksenija Marinković; 18 April 1966 (age 60); Virovitica, SR Croatia, SFR Yugoslavia
- Education: University of Zagreb
- Occupation: Actress
- Years active: 1988–present
- Spouse: Kristijan Ugrina

Ksenija Marinković (born 18 April 1966) is a Croatian film, television and theatre actress.

== Biography ==
Ksenija Marinković was born in Virovitica in 1966 where she finished high school. Ever since she was eight until entering the Academy of Dramatic Art in Zagreb, she was involved in the Virovitica theatre as an amateur actress. As a student of the academy she started to collaborate with the Gavella Drama Theatre and the Histrioni troupe. After graduating from the academy she spent one year with the Teatar u gostima and has been employed with the ZKM theatre in Zagreb since 1989 where she created some of her most important roles. Some of her significant roles were created outside her theatre and she also starred in TV and feature films.

== Filmography ==
=== Movie roles ===
Year	Film	Role
1988	Mjesec u djevici	?
1989	Krvopijci	?
1990	Eskperiment	?
1990	Fatal Sky	?
1990	Jecarji	Kristina
1993	Dok nitko ne gleda	?
1994	Each Time We Part Away	Headmistress
1994	Između Zaglula i Zaharijusa	?
1995	Noć za slušanje	?
1996	Prepoznavanje	shopkeeper
1997	Tranquilizer Gun	Guitar player
1997	Russian Meat	?
1998	The Three Men of Melita Žganjer	Maca
1999	Red Dust	Doctor
2000	Celestial Body	Mrvica
2004	100 Minutes of Glory	Miss Ridlich
2004	Sex, Drink and Bloodshed	?
2005	First Class Thieves	Psychologist
2005	Sleep Sweet, My Darling	Nadica
2007	Play Me a Love Song	Emica
2008	Horton Hears a Who! - Croatian version	Kangaroo
2009	Metastases	Kizo's mother
2011	Room 304	Elira
2011	Korak po korak	Vjera Kralj
2012	Vegetarian Cannibal	dr. Domljan
2012	Hives	Lady in the bus
2013	Šuti	Ksenija
2016	The Constitution	Maja Samardžić
2022	Have You Seen This Woman?	Draginja

=== Television roles ===
Year	Film	Role
2005	Naša mala klinika	Miss Žalbić
2005	Kad zvoni?	Igor's mother
2005	Žutokljunac	Marica
2005	Bitange i princeze	Unuka
2005–2006	Bumerang	Sofija
2006–2007	Kazalište u kući	Melanija Matačić-Kurelec
2006–2013	Odmori se, zaslužio si	Melita Bajs
2007	Operacija Kajman	Ankica Margetić
2008	Hitna 94	Kaja
2008–2009; 2011–2012	Stipe u gostima	Neda Šoštarić
2011–2012	Provodi i sprovodi	Ksenija Vajs-Ćalasan
2012	Nedjeljom ujutro, subotom navečer	Filip's mother
2013	Počivali u miru	Dijana
