= Golden Arena =

Golden Arena may refer to:

- The Croatian national film award presented at the Pula Film Festival:
  - Big Golden Arena for Best Film
  - Golden Arena for Best Actor
  - Golden Arena for Best Supporting Actor
  - Golden Arena for Best Actress
  - Golden Arena for Best Supporting Actress
  - Golden Arena for Best Cinematography
  - Golden Arena for Best Costume Design
  - Golden Arena for Best Director
  - Golden Arena for Best Film Editing
  - Golden Arena for Best Film Music
  - Golden Arena for Best Production Design
  - Golden Arena for Best Screenplay
- Golden Spike Arena, a multi-purpose arena in Ogden, Utah, United States
