= Goran Grgić =

Croatian actor

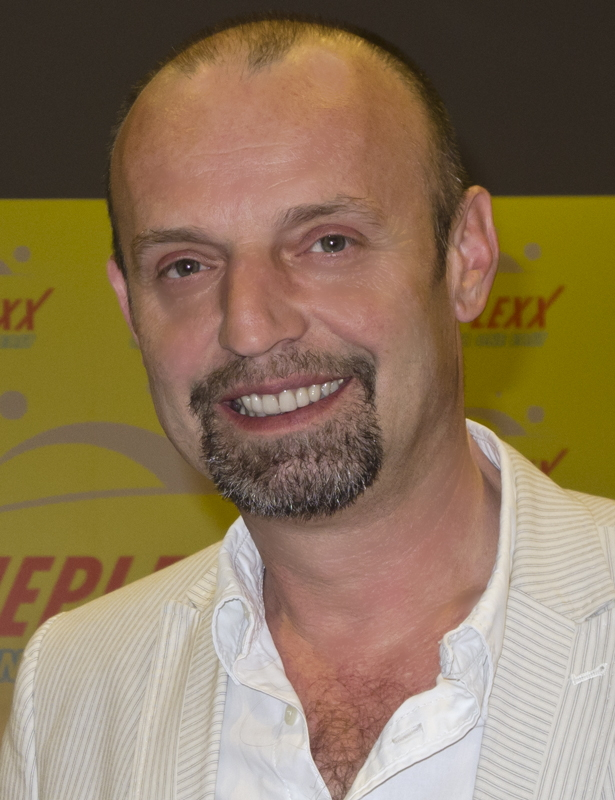
- Born: 17 November 1965 (age 60); Osijek, SR Croatia, SFR Yugoslavia (now Croatia)
- Occupation: Actor
- Years active: 1972–present
- Spouse: Ivana Grgić (m. 1995)
- Children: 3

Goran Grgić (born 17 November 1965) is a Croatian theatre, television and film actor.

Grgić graduated from the Zagreb Academy of Dramatic Art in 1990. Upon graduation he was hired as a regular cast member at the Gavella theatre in Zagreb. Since 2002 he has been a member of cast at the Croatian National Theatre in Zagreb.

== Partial filmography ==
- Fragments: Chronicle of a Vanishing (Krhotine - Kronika jednog nestajanja, 1991) - Doktor
- Zlatne godine (The Golden Years, 1994) - Mislav Petras
- The Price of Life (Cijena života, 1994) - Dusan
- Gospa (1995) - Interviewer
- Noć za slušanje (1995, Short) - Tvrtko
- Russian Meat (Rusko meso, 1997) - Hrvoje
- The Three Men of Melita Žganjer (Tri muškarca Melite Žganjer, 1998) - Vodja snimanja
- Transatlantic (1998) - Austrijski Casnik
- Četverored (1999) - fra Lujo Milicevic
- Garcia (1999)
- Bogorodica (1999)
- Celestial Body (Nebo sateliti, 2000) - Senna
- Slow Surrender (Polagana predaja, 2001)
- Queen of the Night (Kraljica noći, 2001) - Doktor Janda
- Behind Enemy Lines (2001) - Technician
- Sami (2001)
- God Forbid a Worse Thing Should Happen (2002) - Direktor
- Horseman (Konjanik, 2003) - Andrija
- Ispod crte (2003) - Inspektor
- Long Dark Night (Duga mračna noć, 2004) - Franz Kirchmeier
- First Class Thieves (2005) - Dramski Prvak
- Sleep Sweet, My Darling (Snivaj, zlato moje, 2005) - Redatelj
- Libertas (2006) - Luka
- Kradljivac uspomena (2007)
- I Have to Sleep, My Angel (Moram spavat', anđele, 2007) - Otac
- No One's Son (Ničiji sin, 2008) - Inspektor
- Zapamtite Vukovar (2008)
- U zemlji cudesa (2009) - Gospodin
- Tito (2010, TV Mini-Series) - Archbishop Stepinac
- Lea and Darija (2011) - Dubravko Dujsin
- Blurs (2011) - Lanin tata
- Duh babe Ilonke (2011) - Grobar
- Cvjetni trg (2012) - Ministar
- Simon Cudotvorac (2013) - Vedran
- A Perfect Day (2015) - Commander at the Checkpoint
- Wasn't Afraid to Die (2016) - Franjo Greguric
- Anka (2017) - Sudac
- Lavina (2017) - Majstor Tvrtko
- F20 (2018) - Tata
- Koja je ovo država! (2018) - Sef tajne sluzbe
- Ufuraj se i pukni (2019)
- Zagrebacki Ekvinocij (2019) - Uberovac
- General (2019) - Pukovnik M. P.
- Bosnian pot (2023)
- Beautiful Evening, Beautiful Day (2024)

== See also ==
- Croatian National Theatre in Zagreb
