= Matija Prskalo =

Croatian actress

- Born: 25 October 1966 (age 60); Zagreb, SR Croatia, SFR Yugoslavia
- Occupation: Actress
- Years active: 1990–present
- Spouse: Dominik Galić
- Children: 1

Matija Prskalo (born 25 October 1966) is a Croatian theatre, film and television actress.

== Filmography ==
=== Television roles ===
- Nemoj nikome reći as Anita Jurić (2015-2016)
- Zora dubrovačka as Marijana (2013-2014)
- Stipe u gostima as Anica (2011)
- Vrata do vrata (TV pilot) as Tamara (2009)
- Stipe u gostima as Anica (2009)
- Zauvijek susjedi as Marica (2008)
- Ne daj se, Nina as Pamela Privora (2008)
- Luda kuća as Lidija Devčić (2005-2006)
- Zabranjena ljubav as Stela Vidak (2004-2006)
- Bitange i princeze as sutkinja (2006)
- Milijun eura as voditeljica (2005)
- Naši i vaši as Mila (2002)
- Veliki odmor (2000)

=== Movie roles ===
- Djeca jeseni as teacher (2012)
- Cvjetni trg as Mackov's wife (2012)
- Nije kraj as Rahmeta (2008)
- Crveno i crno as Beba (2006)
- Accidental Co-Traveller as Dadilja (2004)
- The Society of Jesus as Castellan's wife (2004)
- Sjaj u očima as Agnes (2003)
- Witnesses as nurse (2003)
- Duga ponoć as Ivanov's wife (2003)
- Queen of the Night as Goca (2001)
- Starci as Hilga (2001)
- Višnje u rakiji (2000)
- Ispovijed koju niste zavrijedili (1999)
- Madonna as novinarka RTB-a (1999)
- When the Dead Start Singing as Cinco's daughter (1998)
- Transatlantic (1998)
- How the War Started on My Island as Lucija Milosavljević (1996)
- Zona sudbine (1992)
- Luka (1992)
- Fragments: Chronicle of a Vanishing (1991)
- Ljeto za sjećanje (1990)
