= Golden Arena for Best Film Editing =

- Country: Yugoslavia (1980–1990); Croatia (1992–present)
- Presented by: Pula Film Festival Jury
- First award: 1980
- Currently held by: Dubravka Turić (2020)
- Website: Official Website

== List of winners ==
The following is a list of winners of the Golden Arena for Best Film Editing at the Pula Film Festival.

=== Yugoslav competition (1980–1990) ===
Year	Winner	English title(s)	Original title(s)
1980	Vuksan Lukovac		Svetozar Marković
1981	Vesna Lažeta	High Voltage	Visoki napon
1982	Andrija Zafranović		Kraljevski voz
1983	Vuksan Lukovac (2)	Balkan Express	Balkan ekspres
1984	Andrija Zafranović (2)	Balkan Spy	Balkanski špijun
1985	Filip Robar Dorin		Ovni in mamuti
1986	Andrija Zafranović (3)	Evening Bells	Večernja zvona
1987	Petar Marković		Hi-Fi
1988	Branka Čeperac	A Film with No Name	Za sada bez dobrog naslova
1989	Goran Terzić (co-winner)	The Fall of Rock and Roll	Kako je propao rokenrol
1989	Mustafa Presheva (co-winner)	The Fall of Rock and Roll	Kako je propao rokenrol
1989	Snežana Ivanović (co-winner)	The Fall of Rock and Roll	Kako je propao rokenrol
1990	Karpo Godina		Umetni raj

=== Croatian competition (1992–present) ===
Year	Winner	English title	Original title
1991	Festival was cancelled.^{[A]}		
1992	Martin Tomić	The Stone Gate	Kamenita vrata
1993	Not awarded.		
1994	Competition program was cancelled.^{[B]}		
1995	Josip Podvorac	Washed Out	Isprani
1996	Vesna Štefić		Prepoznavanje
1997	Bernarda Fruk (co-winner)	Mondo Bobo	Mondo Bobo
1997	Ivana Fumić (co-winner)	Mondo Bobo	Mondo Bobo
1998	Marina Barac	The Three Men of Melita Zganjer	Tri muškarca Melite Žganjer
1999	Josip Podvorac (2)	Red Dust	Crvena prašina
2000	Tomislav Pavlic	Cashier Wants to Go to the Seaside	Blagajnica hoće ići na more
2001	Not awarded.		
2002	Marina Barac (2)	God Forbid a Worse Thing Should Happen	Ne dao bog većeg zla
2003	Josip Podvorac (3)	Here	Tu
2004	Dubravko Slunjski	A Wonderful Night in Split	Ta divna Splitska noć
2005	Slaven Zečević	Sleep Sweet, My Darling	Snivaj, zlato moje
2006	Tomislav Pavlic (2)	I Love You	Volim te
2007	Goran Guberović	The Living and the Dead	Živi i mrtvi
2008	Sandra Botica	Will Not End Here	Nije kraj
2009	Dubravko Slunjski (2)	Love Life of a Gentle Coward	Ljubavni život domobrana
2010	Mato Ilijić	Forest Creatures	Šuma summarum
2011	Slaven Zečević (2)	Koko and the Ghosts	Koko i duhovi
2012	Hrvoje Mršić (co-winner)	A Letter to My Father	Pismo Ćaći
2012	Damir Čučić (co-winner)	A Letter to My Father	Pismo Ćaći
2013	Slaven Zečević (3)	Hush	Šuti
2014	Veljko Segarić	Number 55	Broj 55
2015	Vesna Lažeta (co-winner)	The High Sun	Zvizdan
2015	Hrvoje Mršić (2) (co-winner)	The High Sun	Zvizdan
2016	Tomislav Pavlic (3)	On the Other Side	S one strane
2017	Hrvoje Mršić (3)		Agape
2018	Tomislav Pavlic (4)	Comic Sans	Comic Sans
2019	Marko Ferković	The Diary of Diana B	Dnevnik Diane Budisavljević
2020	Dubravka Turić		Tereza37

== Footnotes ==
A. Although the festival was opened on 26 July 1991 and a press screening of Zrinko Ogresta's film Fragments: Chronicle of a Vanishing was held, the festival board presided by Antun Vrdoljak decided to cancel the festival, as a sign of protest against violence related to the Ten-Day War in Slovenia and the initial stages of the Croatian War of Independence. Nine films were supposed to be screened in the competition program.
B.: The awards ceremony was cancelled in 1994 as only one Croatian feature film was made in the preceding 12 months (Bogdan Žižić's The Price of Life). The festival was held in spite of this, but the usual competition program was replaced by screenings of the classic works of the Zagreb School of Animated Film and documentaries, while the main program featured premieres of six American movies.

== See also ==
- Cinema of Yugoslavia
- Cinema of Croatia
