= Golden Arena for Best Costume Design =

- Country: Yugoslavia (1978–1990); Croatia (1992–present)
- Presented by: Pula Film Festival Jury
- First award: 1978
- Currently held by: Sara Giancane & Valentina Vujović (2020)
- Website: Official Website

== List of winners ==
The following is a list of winners of the Golden Arena for Best Film Editing at the Pula Film Festival.

=== Yugoslav competition (1980–1990) ===
Year	Winner	English title(s)	Original title(s)	Ref.
1978	Hasan Sućeska		Ljubav i bijes	
1979	Milena Kumar		Draga moja Iza	
1980	Jasna Petrović		Svetozar Marković	
1981	Ljiljana Dragović		Dorotej	
1982	Divna Jovanović		Smrt gospodina Goluže	
1983	Saša Kuljač		Nešto između	
1984	Nadežda Perović		O pokojniku sve najlepše	
1985	Alenka Bartl		Dedeščina	
1986	Irena Felicijan		Kormoran	
1987	Milena Kumar (2)		Ljubezni Blanke Kolak	
1988	Ika Škomrlj	The Glembays	Glembajevi	
1989	Biljana Dragović (shared)	Battle of Kosovo	Boj na Kosovu	
1989	Ljiljana Dragović (2) (shared)	Battle of Kosovo	Boj na Kosovu	
1990	Best Costume Design category cancelled.			

=== Croatian competition (1992–present) ===
Year	Winner	English title	Original title	Ref.
1991	Festival was cancelled.^{[A]}			
1992	Maja Galasso	Charuga	Čaruga	
1993	Best Costume Design category cancelled.			
1994	Competition program was cancelled.^{[B]}			
1995	Vjera Ivanković	Each Time We Part Away	Svaki put kad se rastajemo	
1996	Vanda Ninić	How the War Started on My Island	Kako je počeo rat na mom otoku	
1997	Lada Gamulin	The Third Woman	Treća žena	
1998	Ruta Knežević	Transatlantic	Transatlantik	
1999	Ruta Knežević (2)	Wish I Were a Shark	Da mi je biti morski pas	
2000	Ksenija Jeričević	Celestial Body	Nebo, sateliti	
2001	Ana Savić-Gecan	Alone	Sami	
2002	Ruta Knežević (3)	Winter in Rio	Prezimiti u Riu	
2003	Ante Tonči Vladislavić		Svjetsko čudovište	
2004	Ana Savić-Gecan (2)	100 Minutes of Glory	Sto minuta slave	
2005	Željka Franulović	Sleep Sweet, My Darling	Snivaj, zlato moje	
2006	Željko Nosić (shared)	Libertas	Libertas	
2006	Nina Silobrčić (shared)	Libertas	Libertas	
2006	Franc Pastieri (shared)	Libertas	Libertas	
2007	Sanja Šeler	Play Me a Love Song	Pjevajte nešto ljubavno	
2008	Željka Franulović (2)	Will Not End Here	Nije kraj	
2009	Doris Kristić	In the Land of Wonders	U zemlji čudesa	
2010	Zorana Meić	Forest Creatures	Šuma summarum	
2011	Barbara Bourek	Lea and Darija	Lea i Darija	
2012	Slavica Šnur	Sonja and the Bull	Sonja i bik	
2013	Emina Kušan	The Mysterious Boy	Zagonetni dječak	
2014	Vedrana Rapić	Number 55	Broj 55	
2015	Ana Savić-Gecan (3)	The High Sun	Zvizdan	
2016	Ivana Zozoli Vargović	All the Best	Sve najbolje	
2017	Katarina Pilić	Quit Staring at My Plate	Ne gledaj mi u pijat	
2018	Morana Starčević	The Eighth Commissioner	Osmi povjerenikz	
2019	Selena Orb	The Last Serb in Croatia	Posljednji Srbin u Hrvatskoj	
2020	Sara Giancane (shared)		Mare	
2020	Valentina Vujović (shared)		Mare	

== Footnotes ==
A. Although the festival was opened on 26 July 1991 and a press screening of Zrinko Ogresta's film Fragments: Chronicle of a Vanishing was held, the festival board presided by Antun Vrdoljak decided to cancel the festivale, as a sign of protest against violence related to the Ten-Day War in Slovenia and the initial stages of the Croatian War of Independence. Nine films were supposed to be screened in the competition program.
B.: The awards ceremony was canceled in 1994 as only one Croatian feature film was made in the preceding 12 months (Bogdan Žižić's The Price of Life). The festival was held in spite of this, but the usual competition program was replaced by screenings of the original works of the Zagreb School of Animated Film and documentaries, while the main program featured premieres of six American movies.

== See also ==
- Cinema of Yugoslavia
- Cinema of Croatia
