= While No One Is Watching =

While No One Is Watching may refer to:

- While No One Is Watching (2013 film), a Swedish documentary film
- While No One Is Watching (1993 film), a Croatian TV film
