= Vili Matula =

Croatian actor and political activist

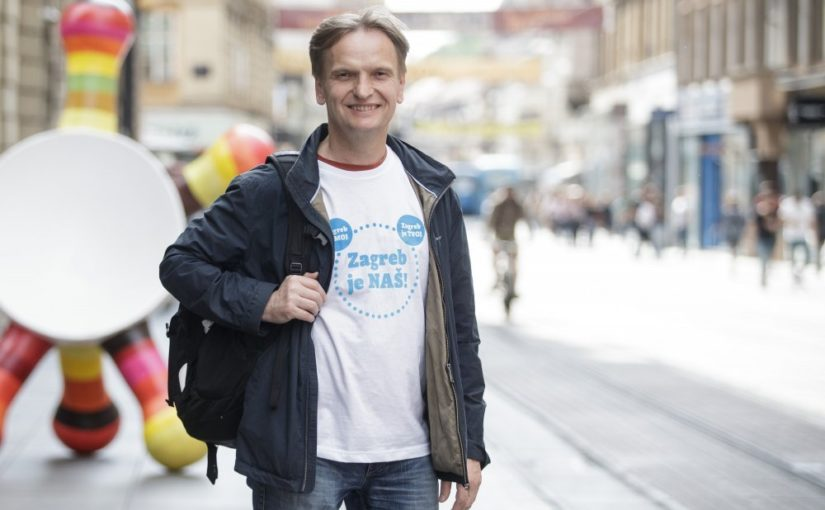
- Born: Vilim Matula; 5 March 1962 (age 64); Zagreb, PR Croatia, FPR Yugoslavia
- Occupations: Actor; director; producer; comedian; civil rights activist
- Years active: 1978–present
- Spouse: Branka Trlin

Vilim "Vili" Matula (born 5 March 1962) is a Croatian actor, director, activist, and politician. He serves as a representative in the Croatian Parliament for green left coalition We Can!.

Matula's acting roles include S.P.U.K., Infection, 100 Minutes of Glory, Wallenberg: A Hero's Story, Schindler's List, and Rosencrantz & Guildenstern Are Dead. He works with the Kerempuh Satirical Theatre in Zagreb.

== Early life ==
Matula attended elementary and high school in Zagreb and was a member of the Zagreb Youth Theatre college. In 1978, Matula started his own theatre group, "Domaći" before enrolling in the Academy of Dramatic Art in 1980. After graduating in 1985, he joined Zagreb's Comedy Theatre. In 1988, Matula co-founded Zagreb's Acting Studio, intended for developing acting skills with techniques such as the Strasberg Method, the Chekhov Technique, Meyerhold's Biomechanics, and the Alexander Technique.

In 1993, Matula attended the Summer Acting Programme at the Royal National Theatre in London. From 1987 to 1997, he was employed in the drama ensemble of the Zagreb Youth Theatre.

== Career ==
=== Acting ===
In 2000, he participated in the launching of the Boal Forum Theatre by invitation from theatrologist and feminist critic Nataša Govedić. In 2001, Matula started his collaboration with Damir Bartol Indoš and The House of Extreme Music Theatre Group Kugla. In 2008, he appeared in a supporting role in Metastases, for which he won a Marul award and a Croatian Theatre Award. He was nominated for an Apollo Prize at the Belgrade Culture Festival.

Matula has appeared in Tranquilizer Gun, Is It Clear, My Friend?, Infection, 100 Minutes of Glory, Long Dark Night, and Šuma summarum. For his role in 100 Minutes of Glory, Matula won Best Supporting Actor at the Pula Film Festival. He has also appeared in productions of Wallenberg: A Hero's Story, Schindler's List, and Rosencrantz & Guildenstern Are Dead (where he played Horatio). His television work includes guest roles on Zakon!, Naša mala klinika, and Žutokljunac. Matula has also filmed and produced television specials and shorts for the Motovun Film Festival.

Matula has recorded several hundred radio dramas. His spoken word discography includes reciting works by August Šenoa, Ivan Goran Kovačić, Ante Kovačić, Vladimir Nazor, and Miroslav Krleža. He provided vocals for three songs on the Punk Cabaret album by Stanislav Kovačić. He voiced several characters on the Croatian-American animated film The Elm-Chanted Forest, Chum in the Croatian dub of Finding Nemo (2003), and Sterling in the Croatian dub of Cars 3 (2017).

=== Politics ===
Matula was a member of the League of Communists of Croatia, as well as delegate in the 11th and final convention of the Central Committee of the League of Communists of Croatia, which resulted in the first democratic elections in 1989 of the Socialist Republic of Croatia, then part of the Socialist Federal Republic of Yugoslavia.

Matula has opposed the Right to the city movement PravoNaGRAD in Zagreb as well as neo-fascism. He's one of the founders of the Actor's Union, of which he was also a president. Matula is a member of the coordinating committee of Zagreb is OURS! (Zagreb je NAŠ!), a progressive citizen platform registered as a green-municipalist party. In the Zagreb municipal elections of 2017, Matula entered as a candidate in the borough council of Donji grad as vice president. His focus included council suppression and corrupt behavior of city authorities. In 2019 he became a founding member of the citizen platform We can! (Možemo!) that formed a green-left coalition for the 2020 parliamentary election. He was elected to the Croatian Parliament with six other members of the coalition. In 2017, Matula signed the Declaration on the Common Language of the Croats, Serbs, Bosniaks, and Montenegrins.

== Selected filmography ==
=== Television ===
Year	Title	Role	Notes
1985	Wallenberg: A Hero's Story	Second SS Sergant	TV film
1987	The Dirty Dozen: The Deadly Mission	Karl – Krieger's Aide	TV film

=== Film ===
Year	Title	Role	Notes
1993	Schindler's List	Investigator	
1996	Sedma kronika	Antonije	
2004	100 Minutes of Glory	Rapacki	

== Awards ==
- 1988: Orestija Award for Orestija
- 1989: Dubravko Dujšin, Veljko Maričić, and Golden Laughter awards for the play Dekadencija
- 1998: Veljko Maričić, Mila Dimitrijević, Vladimir Nazor, and Croatian Theatre awards for Best Actor and Best Monodrama for "Münchhausen"
- 2004: Golden Arena for Best Supporting Actor
- 2008:Marul and Croatian Theatre awards for supporting role in Metastases
- 2010: Marul and Golden Laughter awards at the Kerempuh Satire Festival for Balon
- 2010: Orlando Award at the Dubrovnik Summer Festival for lead role in Gogol's Revizor
- 2019: Apollo Prize and Marul Award for Best Actor in Govori glasnije!
