= Lada Kaštelan =

Croatian dramatist and screenwriter

Lada Kaštelan (born 2 May 1961) is a Croatian dramatist and screenwriter.

Between 1987 and 2007, Kaštelan worked as a dramaturge at the Croatian National Theatre, Zagreb. Since 2007, she has been a professor at the Academy of Dramatic Art, University of Zagreb.

Kaštelan's screenplay for Fragments: Chronicle of a Vanishing, co-written with Zrinko Ogresta, received the Golden Arena for Best Screenplay at the 1992 Pula Film Festival. Her play Giga i njezini received the 1995 Marin Držić Award.

== Sources ==
- "Lada Kaštelan, izvanredni profesor". adu.unizg.hr (in Croatian). Academy of Dramatic Art, University of Zagreb. 9 June 2009.
