= What Is a Man Without a Moustache? =

- Promotional poster (Croatian)
- Directed by: Hrvoje Hribar
- Screenplay by: Hrvoje Hribar
- Based on: Što je muškarac bez brkova? by Ante Tomić
- Produced by: Hrvoje Hribar; Mirko Galić
- Starring: Leon Lučev; Zrinka Cvitešić; Ivo Gregurević
- Cinematography: Silvio Jesenković
- Edited by: Ivana Fumić
- Music by: Tamara Obrovac
- Distributed by: United States: Doors Art Foundation
- Release date: July 23, 2005
- Running time: 109 minutes
- Country: Croatia
- Language: Croatian

What Is a Man Without a Moustache? (Croatian: Što je muškarac bez brkova?) is a 2005 Croatian romantic comedy-drama film. Hrvoje Hribar directed the film and wrote the screenplay as an adaptation of Ante Tomić's 2000 novel of the same name.

Starring Leon Lučev and Zrinka Cvitešić and set against a background of a country still recovering from the Croatian War of Independence, the film tells the story of a young widow who falls in love with a local priest and a difficult choice that the priest faces when being forced to choose between the woman and his church. It won the audience award at the Pula Film Festival as the favourite film while Zrinka Cvitešić won two festival awards for her performance in the film.

== Plot ==
Tatjana (Zrinka Cvitešić) and Miljenko (Robert Ugrina) are a young married Croatian couple living in Germany. Miljenko is killed when he falls while working on a construction site and his employer pays a financial settlement to his young widow. Tatjana then moves back to the rural countryside of Croatia where the couple first met. There she meets Father Stipan (Leon Lučev), an alcoholic Catholic priest of the local rundown church. Tatjana uses the settlement money to make a romantic purchase of the hill where Miljenko proposed to her only to make a small fortune when a local developer discovers precious minerals in the hill and pays Tatjana handsomely for it. She uses her newly acquired riches to purchase a grocery store and a hotel. Tatjana becomes a target for new prospective suitors, including her husband's brother Marinko (Ivo Gregurević), who has also recently returned from Germany. Tatjana falls in love with the troubled priest and offers most of her money to him so that the church can be repaired and the parish does not go bankrupt. Under the local bishop's (Ivica Vidović) threat of relocation if the funds aren't raised, Father Stipan is torn between choosing to accept Tatjana's money to be given to the church and choosing Tatjana's love.

== Release, screenings and festival performance ==
What Is a Man Without a Moustache? was commercially released in Croatia on July 23, 2005, and was screened domestically and abroad during 2005 and 2006 at several film festivals including the Pula Film Festival, Sarajevo Film Festival and International Thessaloniki Film Festival. Distributed in the United States by Doors Art Foundation, the film had limited theatrical release in the US, premiering in New York City on May 25, 2006.

At the 53rd Pula Film Festival, the film won the Golden Gate of Pula award as the audience's favourite. At the same festival, Cvitešić won the Golden Arena award for Best Actress in a Leading Role and Tamara Obrovac won the award for Best Music Score. In addition to winning at Pula, Cvitešić also won the Best Actress Award at the 11th Sarajevo Film Festival.

== Critical response ==
What Is a Man Without a Moustache? received generally positive reviews from critics. As of March 9, 2010, aggregate review website Metacritic registered a normalized rating of 62 based on five reviews from critics.

In a review for Variety magazine, critic Deborah Young called What Is a Man Without a Moustache? "an entertaining romantic comedy" and a "good-humored film" while, on the other hand, noting that the film should be better received by local and regional audiences due to its story being "a hard sell abroad". Author and film critic Michael Atkinson, writing for The Village Voice, expressed his divided opinion that the film "is not remarkable or ingenious" but that it still is "adept enough for a pass on." Critic Nathan Lee of The New York Times had also expressed opinions of a divided nature. He called the film "pleasant if inconsequential", offered an opinion that it contains "good-natured sensibility" and a "slightly fabulous tone" while still feeling like "magic realism, without the magic", and concluded his review by stating that "the pleasant pointless of it all is laced with a tantalizing tease of allegory suggested by the dialectical twins and the strain of mellow nationalism in the dialogue." Reviewing the film for TV Guide, Maitland McDonagh awarded the film three stars out of four calling it "sardonic" and "absurdist".

== See also ==
- 2005 in film
- Cinema of Croatia
- List of Croatian films
