= Zvonimir Maycug =

Croatian film director

- Born: 27 December 1959 (age 66); Zvonik, near Vrbovec, Yugoslavia
- Occupations: Film director, screenwriter
- Years active: 1983-1996

Zvonimir Majcug (born 1959), better known by his pen name Zvonimir Maycug, is a Croatian film producer, director, screenwriter, actor, and writer. He is famous for producing the first Croatian and Yugoslav pornographic film Oaza(Oasis) in 1984, which was banned. His film Kalvarija(Calvary) also received notoriety.

== Biography ==
Zvonimir Maycug was born in Zvonik in 1959. In middle school, he participated in film and photographic extracurriculars. He started recording amateur film in 1974, and began writing scripts the following year. He completed his studies at the Zagreb Hotelier School. He recorded a tourist film in Germany, and a documentary film about clay potters who make water pots, in Marija Bistrica. Then he unsuccessfully tried to enroll at the Zagreb Academy of Film Art to study film making. During his compulsory military service in the Yugoslav Army, he wrote the script for his first film, Ja sam tvoj Bog (I am Your God). Upon finishing service, he produced it in 1983, as the youngest film director in Yugoslavia. The film never entered popular distribution.

After recording the hardcore pornographic film Oaza (Oasis) in 1984, he was sentenced to two years of parole and three months of prison if he made the same offense again. The decision was made by the County court in Zagreb by the judge Ranko Marijan on 20 December 1985. His defense argued that it was incorrectly classified as pornography, because the confiscated copy was not intended for publication. He recorded a different version in 1988 which had some success on the video market.

He recorded Kalvarija (Calvary), the first Croatian gay film, in 1997. Actors in his films were amateurs and friends. He recorded his films with a low budget and took many roles in production. After recording Kalvarija, he was left bankrupt. He had to sell his own family house to cover the debts caused by producing the little distributed film. This stopped his production of the film Blago kralja Tomislava (The Treasure of King Tomislav), and a film adaptation of his novel Noć kada su umirale ruže (The Night the Roses Were Dying). He hasn't been involved in writing, publishing or film since. He used to paint while he was in high school, and started earning money off it in the 1990s. His work was primarily copies and commissions for the Catholic Church. He started painting under a pseudonym when the Church found out that he was convicted for creating pornography. During his life he also worked in journalism and erotic theater. He now works in catering and says that "film was always just a hobby for me". When asked if he will ever return to producing film, he says that maybe he will when his children grow up and he can't put anyone at risk with his financial decisions.

== Filmography ==
=== Ja sam tvoj Bog ===
The film was produced in 1983. It is an erotic film with comedic elements. While in the Yugoslav military, Maycug met a man from Gornji Vakuf and visited him upon finishing service. He met an amateur actor group there, consisting of a credit approver in the Bank of Sarajevo, among others. There was enough funding, but every actor was an amateur, aside from lead actress Ružica Sokić. The film was recorded on a 35mm tape in Jadran Film. Shortly before distribution with Kinematografi, Maycug tried publishing a magazine called YU Express with the publisher Vjesnik. However, it was banned by the Zagreb court because of the article "Da li će muslimanski manijaci osvojiti svijet?"(Will the Muslim maniacs conquer the world?), which critiqued Khomeini and Gaddafi, on 31 December 1983. This was due to fear of retribution by the Iranian and Libyan embassies. Following this, Kinematografi cancelled the planned distribution. The lead actress Ružica Sokić also protested, having said that she was lured into the project through misrepresentation. Maycug says this was because of the 1992 shorter VHS re-release, where a few pornographic scenes were edited in the tape from foreign films. The film was only shown at private screenings.

==== Plot ====
A female traveler(played by Sokić) spends the night in a small Bosnian town. Soon, she is overwhelmed with erotic fantasies. In her dreams, she encounters the people she has met during the day, particularly the hotel receptionist(played by Maycug).

=== Oaza ===
The original film was produced in 1984. It was supposed to be pornographic. The film's negative was sent to Jadran Film whereupon the police was alerted, and the film banned. He wrote and published the book Kako je snimljena i zabranjena Oaza(How Oaza was Recorded and Banned) about this event. While pornography was not totally illegal, it was in a legal grey area. Pornographic material became more widespread in Yugoslavia, in the form of VHS, in Spring 1988. The remake followed the same year. Fearing troubles with the law, the remake was more of a parody on pornography, and he sent the negative to the Belgrade-based Zastava film. Often, material not allowed in Croatia was allowed in Serbia, and vice versa. While it was not successful in cinemas, it met moderate success on the VHS market, allowing him to build a family house. The total revenue was, according to Maycug, 120 000 German Marks, 80 000 of which was pure profit.

==== Plot ====
A free-spirited woman has an affair with a provincial painter. She eventually kills him, and later finds another lover, an elderly peasant.

=== Kalvarija ===
The film was produced in 1996. Kalvarija had one public screening in the Zagreb cinema Kustošija and was distributed in the domestic video market. It is the first Croatian film with a same-sex relationship, between a traveling accordionist and a journalist. It was recorded in 32 locations, including the Plitvica Lakes, castles Veliki Tabor, and Trakošćan, nearby villages, Sisak, and Zagreb. Maycug had an organiser who borrowed objects from the Croatian National Theatre for free. Maycug planned to have multiple professional actors, but because of his controversial reputation, the only willing actor with experience was Dubravko Sidor. The film had no explicit romantic or pornographic themes, because Maycug thought it was already subversive enough.

The film went over budget, at 30 000 dollars. It was recorded in around twenty days. It had been supposed to be shown at the Pula Film Festival in 1997, but it was rejected by the organiser due to "not meeting the basic aesthetic and professional criteria". The reason is that parts of the film were recorded only in blue. According to an unconfirmed explanation, the cause was an incident at Jadran Film's laboratory, where chemicals destroyed a part of the negative, turning it blue. Not having enough funds to record again, the blue scenes were edited as night scenes, the rest as day scenes. Maycug insists this is intentional, and says that he used the "American night" technique of recording night scenes during daytime. He says the destroyed parts of the negative were scrapped. Maycug thinks that the real reason for the rejection is Dragica Raščan's act as Teta, who entered the film "very late", after professional actresses rejected the role when they found out he created the first pornographic film. He describes her acting as "[of] debatable [quality]". The film was a box office flop, with little distribution outside of the VHS market, because it was rejected by Kinematografi. On the VHS market it met little success, and only when it was packaged in with Oaza.

The film is melodramatic with many subplots. It presents the Zagreb class as high class, even presenting the journalist's family with a butler, and as posh. Religious motives are important, and the Calvary in the film is a mythical place where believers relive Christ's passion. Also important is the character Teta, the zealous sister of the accordionist's wife. It shows many people in the countryside possessing weapons, and it was common for ex-soldiers to not return their firearms to the military after the Croatian War of Independence. Maycug said that he wanted all of his films to receive attention, so he made the pornographic Oaza, and included a gay couple in Kalvarija. There were no negative reactions to the film's LGBT themes and the actors didn't protest.

==== Plot ====
Trapped in an unhappy marriage, with a grown daughter, the traveling accordionist Slavko(played by amateur Mato Pavlović) falls in love with a male journalist(played by Sidor) he meets on an international bus. He invites him to his home, a castle in the Croatian hills, where he is a caretaker. The journalist's presence strains the frail family ties.

== Legacy and reception ==
His work is a part of the samizdat DIY culture, and he was the main funder of all of his films. Kalvarija, along with Darko Vernić Bundi's Izgubljeno blago, are the beginning of the 1990s Croatian underground film- guerilla, independent production, financed without the usual state sources. Mainstream film studies has by and large disregarded his work, citing its amateur and pornographic nature, until Nenad Polimac's essay on Croatian trash film in 2004. According to Susan Sontag, trash film disregards good taste, has many sexual and violent scenes, is exaggerated, naive yet subversive. Polimac describes Maycug as the most significant Croatian trash producer.

A documentary about the producer was made by Gordan Stojić in 1999, titled "Maycug". Oaza received a short segment in Silvio Mirošničenko's 2011 Pod udarom cenzure(Under Censorship), a documentary about the history of censorship of Croatian film.

His work was included in a retrospective in the cinema Tuškanac in 2004. Maycug's films were shown in Casanovafest in Vrsar in 2009. Kalvarija was shown in cinema Europa in 2011. His entire body of extant work was shown at the accompanying program of the Dani hrvatskog filma (Days of Croatian Film) film festival in 2016. Kalvarija attained cult popularity on the Internet. Index.hr describes Kalvarija as a "masterpiece of trash" and "criminally bad", "a must watch because you won't believe it exists until you see it."

== See also ==
- Low-budget film
