= Julian Po =

- Film Poster
- Directed by: Alan Wade
- Written by: Branimir Šćepanović (book); Alan Wade (written by)
- Produced by: Jon Glascoe; Joseph Pierson
- Starring: Christian Slater; Robin Tunney
- Cinematography: Bernd Heinl
- Edited by: Jeffrey Wolf
- Music by: Patrick Williams
- Distributed by: Fine Line Features
- Release date: September 5, 1997
- Running time: 84 minutes
- Country: United States
- Language: English
- Box office: $51,942

Julian Po is a 1997 American drama film directed by Alan Wade and starring Christian Slater and Robin Tunney.

== Plot ==
The film is the story of a depressed man who comes into a town with no future. The title character (Slater) wanders into a small sleepy town with the intent to kill himself. When the townspeople learn of his plan, Julian becomes a minor celebrity, and is offered all sorts of free perks since this is the most exciting thing to ever happen in that town. However, Julian gets attached to the town and decides life is worth living after all, much to the annoyance of the townspeople who decide to set into motion plans for his suicide, assisted or forced if need be, as long as he keeps his word and carries through with his original plans, much to his desperation and anger.

Julian is a man with no goals except to kill himself at the beginning of the film. He is treated with suspicion, then sympathy once he explains his goal. Then, he meets Sarah (Robin Tunney), who says that she has been waiting her entire life for him. She rekindles within him the desire to live and experience love. After they make love, however, Julian awakens to find the bed empty and a letter from Sarah. He rushes to the bridge out of town, knowing that it is too late: Sarah has committed suicide, explaining that she wants to see Julian "on the other side". Heartbroken, Julian's mental condition is not helped by the townsfolks' cruelty, forcing him to "keep his promise" on killing himself. Before this, many of the townspeople have tried to "assist" him with his suicide; the barber offering a quick, bloody death with a straight razor, the hotel manager showing off his multiple rifles, and the town sheriff expounding on the joy of death and killing.

The film ends with Julian walking out of town, dressed in a suit and tie, "supervised" by the town sheriff, mayor and barber so as to make sure he does not run away. It is assumed that he kills himself shortly afterwards, fulfilling his dream of "going to the sea".

== Cast ==
- Christian Slater as Julian Po
- Robin Tunney as Sarah
- Michael Parks as Vern
- Cherry Jones as Lucy
- Frankie Faison as Sheriff Leon
- Harve Presnell as Mayor Henry Leech
- Allison Janney as Lila Leech
- LaTanya Richardson as Darlene
- Dina Spybey-Waters as Dee
- Bruce Bohne as Pastor Bean
- Roy Cooper as Tobias the Barber
- Željko Ivanek as Tom Potter
- Ellen McElduff as Reva
- iO Tillett Wright as Walter
