= Goran Rušinović =

Croatian film director and screenwriter

- Born: 15 May 1968 (age 58); Zagreb, Yugoslavia
- Occupations: Film director, screenwriter
- Years active: 1997–present

Goran Rušinović is a Croatian film director and screenwriter.

After graduating from the Zagreb Academy of Fine Arts Rušinović went on to enrol at the European Film College in Ebeltoft, Denmark in 1993, where he directed his first short film titled Kilo of Shrimp. In 1996 he went on to the New York Film Academy where he made another short film titled Get the Hard Goods.

His first feature film was the independently produced Mondo Bobo (1997), which won four Golden Arena awards at the 1997 Pula Film Festival, the Croatian national film awards, including the Golden Arena for Best Director.

His next film was the largely unnoticed The World's Greatest Monster (2003), but his 2008 film Buick Riviera, based on a novel by Miljenko Jergović, won him the Golden Arena for Best Screenplay at the 2008 Pula Film Festival, as well as the main award in the regional competition at the 2009 Motovun Film Festival, and the Best Film award at the 2008 Sarajevo Film Festival.

== Filmography ==
- Mondo Bobo (1997)
- The World's Greatest Monster (Svjetsko čudovište, 2003)
- Buick Riviera (2008)
