= Room 304 =

2011 film

- Film poster
- Directed by: Birgitte Stærmose
- Written by: Kim Fupz Aakeson
- Produced by: Jesper Morthorst
- Starring: Mikael Birkkjær
- Cinematography: Igor Martinovic
- Edited by: Anne Østerud
- Music by: Jocelyn Pook
- Release date: 20 October 2011
- Running time: 88 minutes
- Country: Denmark
- Language: Danish

Room 304 (Danish: Værelse 304) is a 2011 Danish drama film directed by Birgitte Stærmose.

== Cast ==
- Mikael Birkkjær as Kasper
- Stine Stengade as Nina
- David Dencik as Martin
- Luan Jaha as Agim
- Ariadna Gil as Teresa
- Lourdes Faberes as Maid
- Ksenija Marinković as Elira
- Trine Dyrholm as Helene
- Magnus Krepper as Jonas
- Ivo Gregurević as Nebojsa

== Premiere and reception ==
The film premiered internationally in the main competition at Karlovy Vary IFF 2011, where it won Special Mention of the Jury for Best Music.

Room 304 brought Stærmose Best Director award at the Aubagne Film Festival in 2013.
