= Branimir Šćepanović =

Serbian and Yugoslav writer (1937–2020)

- Born: 19 April 1937; Podgorica, Kingdom of Yugoslavia
- Died: 30 November 2020 (aged 83); Belgrade, Serbia
- Resting place: Belgrade New Cemetery
- Citizenship: Montenegrin
- Education: University of Belgrade
- Occupation: Writer
- Writing career
- Language: Montenegrin
- Genres: novel, short story, screenplay
- Notable works: Usta puna zemlja Stid; Smrt gospodina Goluže
- Notable awards: October Award

Branimir Šćepanović (Serbian Cyrillic: Бранимир Шћепановић; 19 April 1937 – 30 November 2020) was a Montenegrin and Yugoslav writer.

== Biography ==
His father was a teacher and a published author. Šćepanović started writing during high school. The novel Usta puna zemlje had 32 editions in Serbia and 23 editions in France. He served as artistic director of Avala Film.

Šćepanović won the October award from the city of Belgrade and two Golden Arenas for Best Screenplay.

Šćepanović's 1977 novel, Smrt gospodina Goluže (The Death of Mr. Goluzha) was adapted in 1997 by Alan Wade for the film he directed, Julian Po. Julian Po starred Christian Slater and Robin Tunney, and was released by Fine Line Features and New Line International.

== Works ==
Books

- Pre istine, 1961
- Sramno leto, 1965
- Usta puna zemlje, 1974
- Smrt gospodina Goluže, 1977
- Iskupljenje, 1980
- Ono drugo vreme, Srpska književna zadruga, 2015

Screenplays

- Ono more, 1965
- Kljuc, 1965
- Pre istine, 1968
- Lelejska gora, 1968
- Sramno leto, 1969
- Kako umreti, 1972
- Sutjeska, 1973
- Smrt gospodina Goluže, 1982
- Vreme leoparda, 1985

== See also ==
- Serbian literature
