= The Reaper (2014 film) =

2014 Croatian-Slovenian film

- Film poster
- Directed by: Zvonimir Jurić
- Written by: Zvonimir Jurić; Jelena Paljan
- Starring: Ivo Gregurević
- Release date: 25 July 2014 (Pula Film Festival)
- Running time: 98 minutes
- Countries: Croatia; Slovenia
- Language: Croatian

The Reaper (Croatian: Kosac) is a 2014 Croatian-Slovenian drama film directed by Zvonimir Jurić. It was selected to be screened in the Contemporary World Cinema section at the 2014 Toronto International Film Festival.

== Cast ==
- Ivo Gregurević as Ivo
- Mirjana Karanovic as Mirjana
- Igor Kovac as Josip
- Nikola Ristanovski as Kreso
- Lana Baric
- Zlatko Buric as Rodic
- Dado Cosic as Dado
