= Felix (1996 film) =

1996 film

- Directed by: Božo Šprajc
- Written by: Božo Šprajc
- Starring: Dejan Acimovic
- Release date: 1996
- Running time: 87 minutes
- Country: Slovenia
- Language: Slovenian

Felix (Slovene: Feliks) is a 1996 Slovenian drama film directed by Božo Šprajc. The film was selected as the Slovenian entry for the Best Foreign Language Film at the 69th Academy Awards, but was not accepted as a nominee.

== Cast ==
- Dejan Acimovic
- Ivo Ban
- Peter Benedejcic
- Janez Hocevar
- Meto Jovanovski
- Polona Juh
- Petar Mircevski

== See also ==
- List of submissions to the 69th Academy Awards for Best Foreign Language Film
- List of Slovenian submissions for the Academy Award for Best Foreign Language Film
