= Brcko in Zagreb =

1917 Croatian film

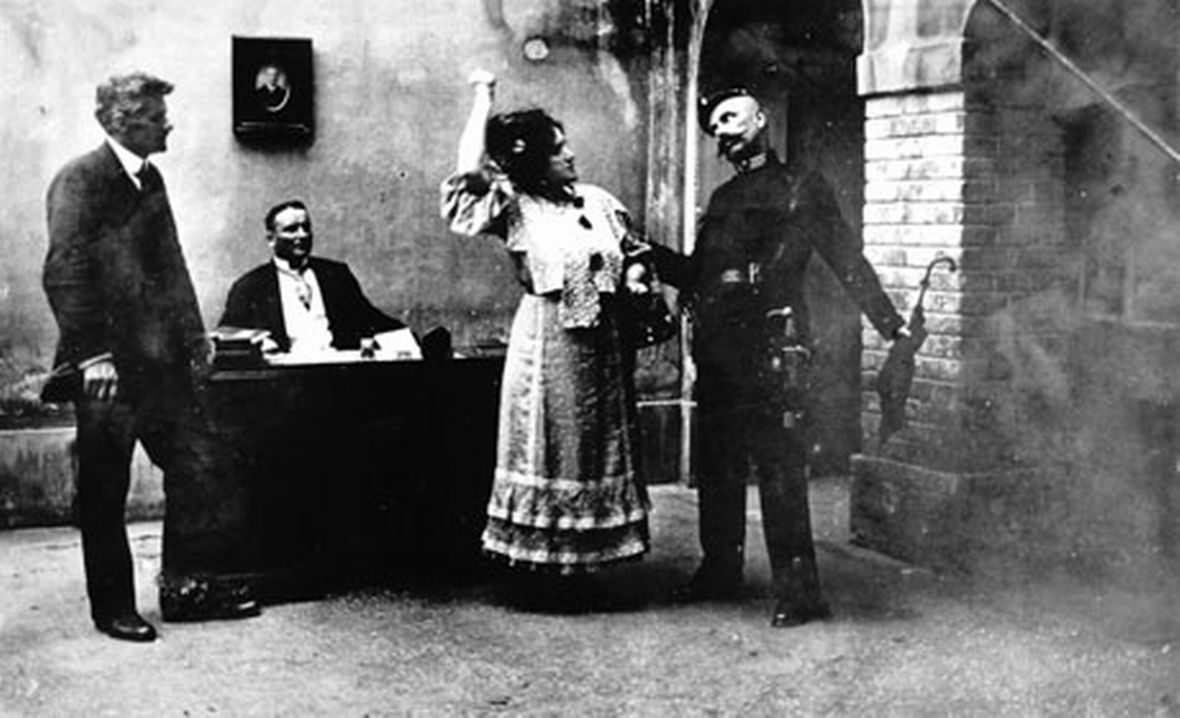
- Croatian: Brcko u Zagrebu
- Directed by: Arsen Maas
- Screenplay by: Arnošt Grund
- Based on: Alaj su nas nasamarili by Arnošt Grund
- Starring: Arnošt Grund; Irma Polak; Tonka Savić; Stjepan Bojničić
- Production company: Croatia Film k.d. (Note: To be distinguished from Croatia Film, a Zagreb-based production company established in 1946.)
- Release date: 28 August 1917 (Croatia)
- Country: Austria-Hungary

Brcko in Zagreb (Croatian: Brcko u Zagrebu) is a 1917 Croatian short comedy film directed by Arsen Maas.

The film, created by a band of Zagreb-based theatrical actors and produced by Croatia Film k.d., features a simple plot in which Brcko, the titular protagonist, comes from a province to the big city. It premiered on 28 August 1917 in Zagreb, making it the first Croatian fictional film.

Like all other Croatian fictional films of the era, Brcko in Zagreb is now considered lost. The identity of Arsen Maas remained unknown until 2014, when it was discovered to be an alias of Ante Masovčić, previously known for his theater-related work, and for being a subject of a well-known painting by Miroslav Kraljević.

== Plot ==
Brcko, a provincial salesman (Arnošt Grund), comes to Zagreb and meets a diva from the operetta (Irma Polak). He takes her to various places, including a public swimming pool on the Sava, and buys her a new outfit. Brcko's wife learns about what is going on in Zagreb. She arrives in the city and finds the two sitting in a café. The wife makes a scene and sprays Brcko in the face with a soda water syphon.

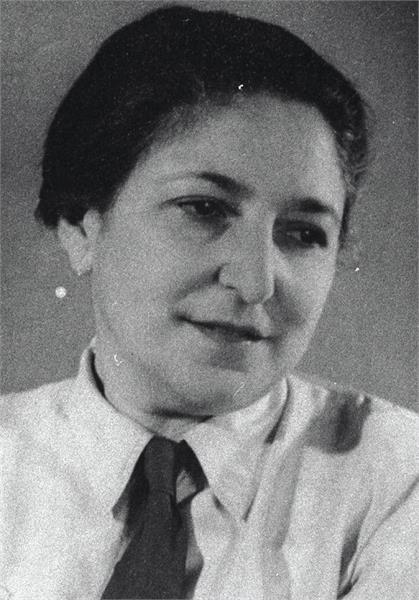
Irma Polak 1941

== Background, release and legacy ==
Brcko in Zagreb was a creation of a group of actors – Arnošt Grund, Irma Polak, Tonka Savić and Stjepan Bojničić – who were members of the ensemble of the Croatian National Theatre in Zagreb, and had also performed in cabaret acts. They felt the time had come to shoot their first film. The film's screenplay was based on Alaj su nas nasamarili (They Played a Trick on Us, 1912), a then-popular comedy play written by Grund, a Czech-born actor and theatre director known for his numerous comedic roles.

The film was produced by Croatia k.d., established in 1917 by Hamilkar Bošković and Julio Bergman, which was the first Croatian film production company. The actors performed virtually as amateurs, with almost no compensation.

Brcko in Zagreb premiered on 28 August 1917 in Metropol Cinema in Zagreb (later known as Capitol Cinema and Zagreb Cinema), making it the first Croatian fictional film. It was shown in a number of cinemas across Croatia and was very popular.

No copies of the film have been preserved, and it is now considered lost, sharing the fate of all other feature films from the earliest days of Croatian cinema, none of which survived in entirety. All that is known about it is based on contemporary newspaper articles and advertisements, as well as several surviving stills.

In 2017, on the 100th anniversary of the film's release, the Croatian Post issued a stamp commemorating the event.

Today, the main prize of the PSSST! Silent Film Festival, held annually in Zagreb since 2007, is named the Brcko Grand Prize, after the protagonist of the first Croatian silent film.

=== Identity of Arsen Maas ===
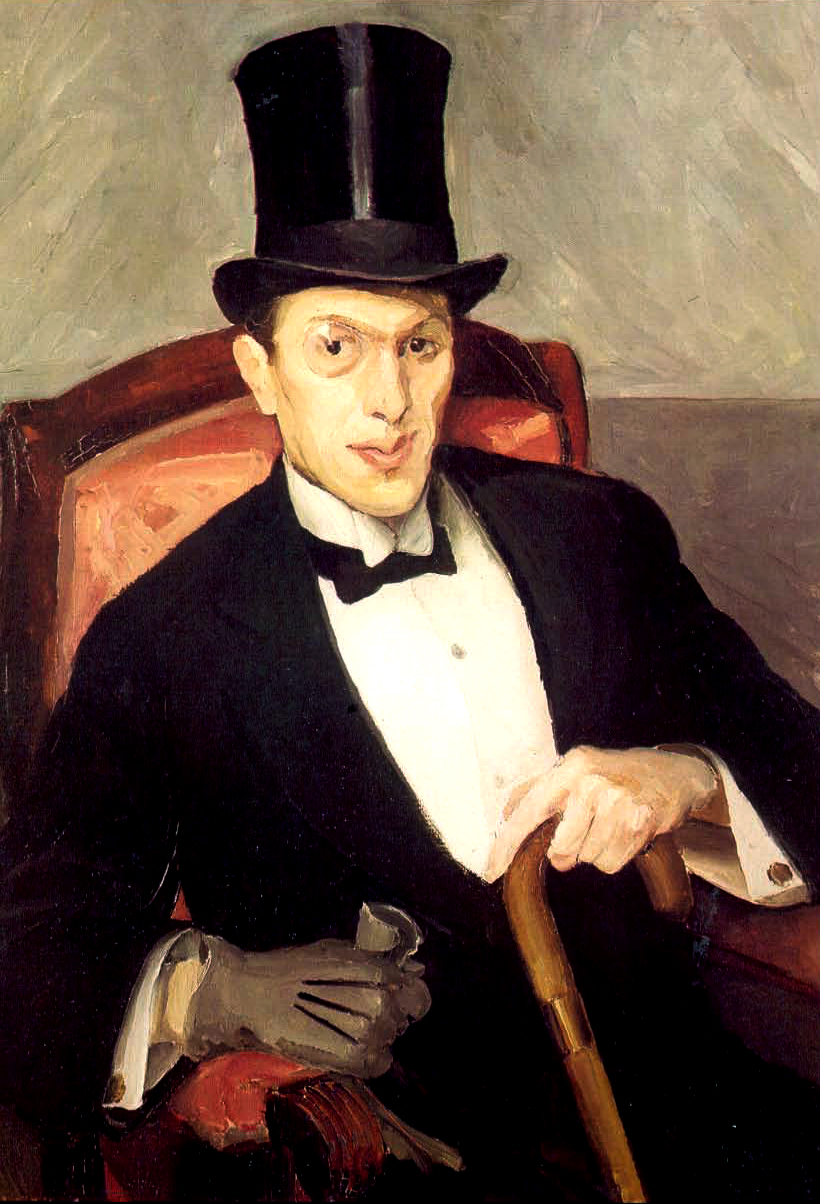
Although Ante Masovčić's identity as a subject of Miroslav Kraljević's Bonvivant (1912) had been known for a long time, the connection with Arsen Maas was discovered only in 2014.

The identity of the film's director, credited as Arsen Maas, was accidentally discovered after being a mystery for almost a century.

In 2014, Croatian film archivist and historian Daniel Rafaelić visited a retrospective exhibition of Miroslav Kraljević, held in Modern Gallery in Zagreb. Under the painting titled Bonvivant – one of Kraljević's most important works – he noticed a legend which identified the subject as Ante Masovčić, also known under the alias of Arsen Mazoff. Rafaelić immediately suspected that Masovčić and Maas are the same person, and subsequent research quickly found strong corroborating evidence.

Ante Masovčić (1889–1948) became friends with Kraljević in Paris, and was 23 years old when he posed for the painting. He wrote theater reviews for Obzor, a Zagreb-based newspaper, and mingled with actors and artists. According to Tin Ujević, Masovčić was "well-known in the theatrical and bohemian circles of Paris". At the time of release of Brcko in Zagreb, Masovčić was the secretary of the Croatian National Theatre in Zagreb, which also employed the entire main cast of the film. In the last decade of his life, Masovčić worked as a diplomat. Brcko in Zagreb most probably remained his only film work.
