= Donja Mahala =

Donja Mahala Доња Махала
- Village
- Location within Bosnia and Herzegovina
- Coordinates: 45.0476°N 18.6644°E
- Country: Bosnia and Herzegovina
- Entity: Federation of Bosnia and Herzegovina
- Canton: Posavina
- Municipality: Orašje

Area
  - Total: 7.88 sq mi (20.40 km^{2})

Population (2013)
  - Total: 3,702
  - Density: 470.0/sq mi (181.5/km^{2})
- Time zone: UTC+1 (CET)
  - Summer (DST): UTC+2 (CEST)

Donja Mahala (Serbian Cyrillic: Доња Махала) is a village in the municipality of Orašje, Bosnia and Herzegovina.

== Demographics ==
In the 1991 census it had a population of 4,273.

According to the 2013 census, its population was 3,702.

Ethnicity in 2013
Ethnicity	Number	Percentage
Croats	3,669	99.1%
Bosniaks	9	0.2%
Serbs	6	0.2%
other/undeclared	18	0.5%
Total	3,702	100%
