= Sonja and the Bull =

2012 Croatian film

- Directed by: Vlatka Vorkapić
- Starring: Judita Franković; Goran Bogdan; Ivo Gregurević
- Release date: 21 July 2012 (PFF)
- Running time: 102 minutes
- Country: Croatia
- Language: Croatian

Sonja and the Bull (Croatian: Sonja i bik) is a 2012 Croatian comedy film directed by Vlatka Vorkapić.

== Plot ==
Animal rights activist Sonja (Judita Franković) and insurance broker Ante (Goran Bogdan) come from very different backgrounds.

Sonja speaks against bull wrestling on TV, which angers some families in Ante's village, which has a tradition of bull wrestling.

Stipe (Dejan Aćimović) bets that Sonja will not dare to come close to Garonja, his beloved bull. Ante is sent to Zagreb to bring Sonja to the village. Using his persuasive talents he succeeds. When the moment comes to face the bull Sonja shows a lot of courage.

== Cast ==
- Judita Franković - Sonja Sterle
- Goran Bogdan - Ante Kevo
- Ivo Gregurević - Ante's father
- Csilla Barath Bastaić - Nika Pofuk
- Dejan Aćimović - Stipe
- Vladimir Tintor - Davor
