= Mondo Bobo =

- Directed by: Goran Rušinović
- Written by: Goran Rušinović
- Produced by: Boris Matić
- Starring: Sven Medvešek; Nataša Dorčić; Svebor Kranjc; Lucija Šerbedžija; Mladen Tojaga; Damir Urban; Jagoda Kaloper; Miroslav Škaro; Tomislav Gotovac
- Cinematography: Ven Jemeršić
- Edited by: Bernarda Fruk; Ivana Fumić
- Music by: Hrvoje Štefotić
- Release date: 1997
- Running time: 80 minutes
- Country: Croatia
- Language: Croatian

Mondo Bobo is a 1997 Croatian film directed by Goran Rušinović.

== Synopsis ==
Bobo, a young man, (played by Sven Medvešek) kills two criminals in self-defense. Acting on his lawyer's advice, he turns himself in, but ends up in a mental institution. He then escapes and meets up with his girlfriend (Mojca Židanik), but she is killed in a police shootout. With Bobo on the run, the police start a manhunt which also attracts a great deal of media attention, including an ambitious journalist (Nataša Dorčić) who follows the chase. Bobo then barricades himself in an abandoned house and takes a woman for a hostage.

== Production ==
Director and screenwriter Goran Rušinović initially had an idea to create a true crime film based on life of Vinko Pintarić, a notorious serial killer, and to cast rock singer Davor Gobac in the lead role. Rušinović quickly abandoned this concept, making the protagonist a fictional character, but the plot remained loosely based on some of the Pintarić's exploits.

Rušinović described his status in Zagreb at the time as being a "total outsider", since Mondo Bobo was his debut feature film. To give himself a sense of security, he drew a complete storyboard before the start of the filming.

== Reception ==
The black-and-white film has been described as "an energetic art film featuring an excellent rock-and-roll score", and was seen at the time as a step away from the usual stereotypes of Croatian cinema. Other critics drew parallels with the poetics of Jean-Luc Godard's films, which in the 1990s went through a period of revival spurred by American independent film. Although the film is described today as having flaws in characterisation and narrative composition, it is still regarded as having offered something fresh and contemporary in Croatian cinema of the 1990s.

The film won five Golden Arena awards at the 1997 Pula Film Festival (the Croatian national film awards festival), including Best Film, Best Director, Best Actor, Best Editing and Best Production Design.
