= Dejan Aćimović =

Croatian actor and film director (born 1963)

- Born: 20 May 1963 (age 62); Čapljina, SR Bosnia and Herzegovina, SFR Yugoslavia
- Occupations: Film director; actor
- Spouse: Tanja Antunović (m. 2009; div. 2010)
- Children: 1
- Website: http://www.dejanacimovic.com

Dejan Aćimović (1963) is a Bosnian-Croatian actor and film director.

== Biography ==
He was born in Čapljina, SFR Yugoslavia, now Bosnia and Herzegovina. As an actor, his work included principal and supporting roles in numerous films, both within and outside Croatia. His directorial debut was Je li jasno, prijatelju? (2000), for which he also won a Golden Arena Award as a supporting actor at the Pula Film Festival.

== Filmography ==
=== Actor ===
- Putovanje u Vučjak (1986) (TV)
- Život sa stricem (1988)
- Diploma za smrt (1989)
- Ljeto za sjećanje (1990)
- Čaruga (1991)
- Zlatne godine (1992)
- Vukovar se vraća kući (1994)
- Gornja granica (1995)
- Prolazi sve (1995)
- Olovna pričest (1995) (TV)
- Posebna vožnja (1995) (TV)
- Felix (1996)
- Božić u Beču (1997)
- The Peacemaker (1997)
- Zbogum na dvaesetiot vek (1998)
- Bogorodica (1999)
- Četverored (1999)
- Je li jasno prijatelju? (2000)
- Novo doba (2002) (TV)
- Radio West (2003)
- Remake (2003)
- Konjanik (2003)
- Infekcija (2003)
- Mathilde (2004)
- Crna hronika (2004) (TV)
- Družba Isusova (2004)
- Iluzija (2004)
- Bal-Can-Can (2005)
- Grbavica (2006)
- Duh u močvari (2006)
- Hermano (2007)
- 72 Days (2010)
- The Parade (2011)
- The Constitution (2016)
- Bosnian pot (2023)

=== Director ===
- Is It Clear, My Friend? (2000)
- I Have to Sleep, My Angel (2007)
- Anka (Croatian film)

== Awards ==
- 2000 Pula Film Festival - Golden Arena Award: Best Actor in a Supporting Role (Je li jasno prijatelju?)
