= Christmas in Vienna (film) =

1997 Croatian film

Christmas in Vienna (Croatian: Božić u Beču) is a 1997 Croatian film written and directed by Branko Schmidt, starring Filip Šovagović and Bojana Gregorić.

The film is set in 1991 in Slavonia during the Yugoslav Wars.

== Reception ==
The film was described as being "about sensitive individuals in the extreme situation of the harsh reality of war. By honestly telling the story of the complex and burdensome relationships between its characters, the film questions universal ethical values."; and a "richly produced patriotic melodrama for our times about the dilemma between the security of exile and the patriotic call to share fate with fellow citizens". However, it has also been accused of technical amateurism, and contributing to a national victim myth, like some other Croatian films produced in the 1990s.

== Screenings and awards ==
- Pula film festival, 1997, where the film received:
  - Golden Arena for Best Screenplay
  - Golden Arena for Best Sound Editing
  - Golden Arena for Best Supporting actor (Drago Krča)
- International film festival, Troia

== See also ==
- List of Christmas films
