= Povratak Katarine Kožul =

Povratak Katarine Kožul is a 1989 Croatian film directed by Slobodan Praljak and starring Alma Prica and Mustafa Nadarević.

== Sources ==
- Povratak Katarine Kožul (in Croatian)
