= Luka (1992 film) =

Luka is a 1992 Croatian film directed by Tomislav Radić, starring Ivo Gregurević, Mirta Zečević, Zlatko Crnković and Damir Lončar.

The script was based on the 1976 novel of the same name by Antun Šoljan.
