= Rene Medvešek =

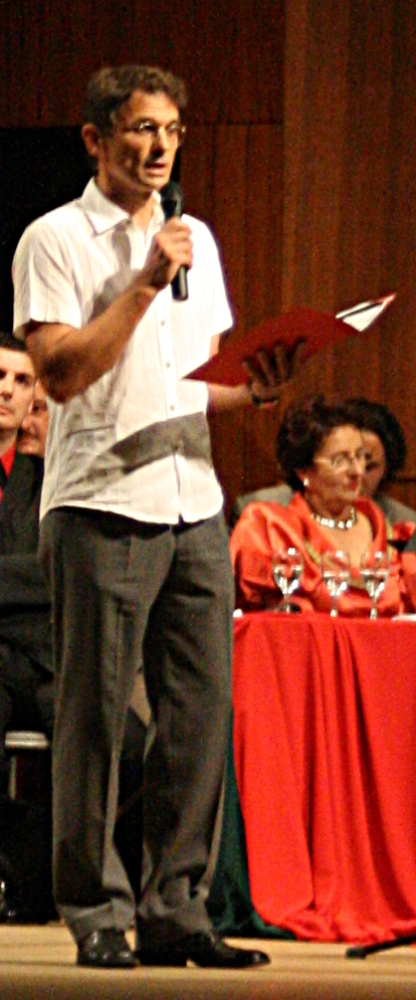
- Medvešek in 2008
- Born: 21 June 1963 (age 61); Velika Gorica, SR Croatia, SFR Yugoslavia
- Occupation: Actor
- Years active: 1974–present
- Spouse: Milena Medvešek
- Children: 4

Rene Medvešek (born 21 June 1963) is a Croatian film and theatre actor and director. He was born in Velika Gorica.

He has appeared in more than 10 films and several television series. To the international audience he is probably best known for playing the role of Serbian terrorist Vlado Mirić in the 1997 action film The Peacemaker.

Medvešek was the stand-in presenter for Oliver Mlakar in the 1990 Eurovision Song Contest staged that year in Zagreb, when the latter quit over comments made about his age at the time. However Mlakar went on to present the show.

== Filmography ==
Year	Title	Role	Notes
1988	The Orchid Villa	Boris	
1989	Veter v mrezi	Mose Kamniski / V. Polajnski	
1990	Captain America	Resistance Fighter	
1990	Fatal Sky	Journalist	
1991	Hrvatske katedrale		
1996	The Seventh Chronicle	Fugitive	
1997	The Peacemaker	Vlado Mirich	
1997	Tranquilizer Gun	Janko	
