= Hush (2013 film) =

- Film poster
- Croatian: Šuti
- Directed by: Lukas Nola
- Starring: Tihana Lazović; Milan Pleština
- Release date: 26 July 2013 (PFF)
- Running time: 86 minutes
- Country: Croatia
- Language: Croatian

Hush (Croatian: Šuti) is a 2013 Croatian drama film directed by Lukas Nola.

== Cast ==
- Tihana Lazović - Beba
- Milan Pleština - Tata
- Živko Anočić - Mirko
- Lana Barić - Mama
- Ksenija Pajić - Jelena
- Bojan Navojec - Simic
