= The Last Will =

2001 film by Zoran Sudar

- Directed by: Zoran Sudar
- Release date: 2001
- Country: Croatia

The Last Will (Croatian: Posljednja volja) is a 2001 Croatian comedy film directed by Zoran Sudar and produced by Vicenco Blagaić.

== Plot ==
The film focuses on a tour guide in small town of Dalmatia, played by Goran Višnjić, who inherited millions from a distant relative in the United States only to find himself pursued by professional killers.

== Production ==
The Last Will was one of the more ambitious Croatian films in the 1990s. It was supposed to be the first Croatian feature film made completely in private production, without state subsidies. It was also supposed to use the charisma of Goran Višnjić and Dalmatia locations to promote Croatian tourism, as well as to encourage American filmmakers to use Croatian locations and film production resources in their future projects.

However, the production was hampered by many financial problems, leading to all types of lawsuits. Producers also failed to bring in any major stars from Hollywood other than Angelica Bridges. Although the film finished in 1999, because of the budget constraints, it had to wait until 2001 to be released in Croatian cinemas. It received mixed reviews and anything but spectacular box-office numbers.
