= Below the Line (2003 film) =

2003 film by Petar Krelja

Below the Line (Ispod crte) is a 2003 Croatian film directed by Petar Krelja, starring Rakan Rushaidat and Leona Paraminski.

== Sources ==
- "Ispod crte". Baza HR kinematografije (in Croatian). Croatian Film Association.
