= Prepoznavanje =

1996 Croatian film by Snježana Tribuson

Prepoznavanje is a Croatian film directed by Snježana Tribuson. It was released in 1996.
