= While No One Is Watching (1993 film) =

While No One Is Watching (Dok nitko ne gleda) is a 1993 Croatian TV film directed by Lukas Nola, starring Dragan Despot, Nataša Dorčić and Ivo Gregurević.

While No One Is Watching, Nola's student work, gained him recognition for its post-modernist genre approach. A mix of crime thriller, melodrama and comedy, it is characterized by energetic direction and colorful characters. While No One Is Watching won the Oktavijan Award for Best Short Film by the Croatian Film Critics' Society.
