= Snježana Tribuson =

Croatian screenwriter and film director (born 1957)

- Born: 8 February 1957 (age 69); Bjelovar, PR Croatia, FPR Yugoslavia
- Occupation: Director
- Years active: 1981–present

Snježana Tribuson (born 8 February 1957) is a Croatian screenwriter and film director. She directed more than ten films since 1981. In 1998 she won the Golden Arena for Best Screenplay for the film The Three Men of Melita Žganjer.

== Selected filmography ==
| Year | Title | Role | Notes |
|---|---|---|---|
| 1998 | The Three Men of Melita Žganjer | | |
| 2002 | God Forbid a Worse Thing Should Happen | | |
