= Alone (2001 film) =

2001 film by Lucas Nola

Alone (Sami) is a 2001 Croatian film directed by Lukas Nola, starring Leon Lučev and Nina Violić.

== Sources ==
- "Sami". Baza HR kinematografije (in Croatian). Croatian Film Association.
