= A Summer to Remember (1990 film) =

A Summer to Remember (Ljeto za sjećanje) is a Croatian film directed by Bruno Gamulin. It was released in 1990.
