= The Seventh Chronicle =

1996 Croatian film

The Seventh Chronicle (Sedma kronika) is a 1996 Croatian film directed by Bruno Gamulin, starring Rene Medvešek, Alma Prica and Sven Medvešek.
