= Antun Šoljan =

Croatian writer

Antun Šoljan (1 December 1932 – 12 July 1993) was a Croatian writer in a period of Cold War who appeared as a part of the literary magazine Krugovi (Circles, from 1952 onwards). Šoljan was active as a poet, novelist, short story writer, essayist, literary critic and translator.He wrote four novels: Izdajice (1961, Traitors), Kratki izlet (1965, A Brief Excursion), Luka (1976, The Harbour) and Drugi ljudi na mjesecu (1978, Other People on the Moon), as well as short stories, theatre and radio plays and poems. He began under the influence of existentialism, in the vein of Albert Camus, about the alienation of modern man, embracing postmodernist concepts later in his career. He is one of the most prominent Croatian authors of what was dubbed the "jeans prose" (Croatian: proza u trapericama), an off-beat prose genre modeled on J. D. Salinger's The Catcher in the Rye.

== Works ==
=== Poetry collections ===
- Na rubu svijeta (1956)
- Izvan fokusa (1957)
- Gartlic za čas kratiti (1965)
- Gazela i druge pjesme (1970)
- Bacač kamena (1985)

=== Novels ===
- Izdajice (1961)
- Kratki izlet (1965)
- Luka (1976)
- Drugi ljudi na mjesecu (1978)

=== Short story collections ===
- Deset kratkih priča za moju generaciju (1966)
- Obiteljska večera i druge priče (1975)

=== Essay collections ===
- Prošlo nesvršeno vrijeme (1992)

== Bibliography ==
- Flaker, Aleksandar (1977). Proza u trapericama. Zagreb: Liber (Razlog).
- Župan, Ivica (1978). "Aleksandar Flaker, "Proza u trapericama", Liber/Razlog, Zagreb 1977". Croatica.
- Helena Peričić, 'Isprepletanje igre/svečanosti u Šoljanovoj Romanci o tri ljubavi ', Dani hvarskog kazališta (Igra i svečanost u hrvatskoj književnosti i kazalištu), ed. by N. Batušić et al., Zagreb-Split, HAZU-Književni krug, 31, 2005., 406–415.
- Helena Peričić, 'Između stvaralačkog egzila i poticaja domaće književne tradicije (Slamnig, Šoljan, Paljetak)', in: Dani hvarskog kazališta (Prostor i granice hrvatske književnosti i kazališta), ed.by N. Batušić et al., Zagreb-Split, HAZU-Književni krug, 32, 2006, 346–359.
- Helena Peričić, 'Multiculturalism and the Return to Tradition. Elements of the Literatures in English in the Works of Some Postmodern Croatian Playwrights: Slamnig - Šoljan - Paljetak', Identities in Transition in the English-Speaking World, ed. by Nicoletta V′′asta et al., Udine, Forum, 2011, 251–260.
- Obituary: Antun Soljan
- Umro Antun Šoljan (in Croatian)
- Vodič kroz lektire za srednju školu, Školska knjiga, Zagreb, 1997.
