= Lukas Nola =

Croatian film director and screenwriter (1964–2022)

- Born: 31 March 1964; Zagreb, SR Croatia, SFR Yugoslavia
- Died: 29 October 2022 (aged 58)
- Years active: 1993–2022
- Spouse: Barbara Živković
- Children: 2
- Awards: Golden Arena for Best Director; 2000 Celestial Body

Lukas Nola (31 March 1964 – 29 October 2022) was a Croatian film director and screenwriter. He also worked for television and theater and wrote poetry.

== Filmography ==
- Dok nitko ne gleda (TV film, 1993)
- Each Time We Part Away (Svaki put kad se rastajemo, TV film, 1994)
- Russian Meat (Rusko meso, 1997)
- Celestial Body (Nebo, sateliti, 2000)
- Alone (Sami, 2001)
- True Miracle (Pravo čudo, 2007)
- Hush (Šuti, 2013)
- Escort (Escort, 2023)
