= Russian Meat =

1997 film

- Directed by: Lukas Nola
- Written by: Lukas Nola
- Starring: Ivo Gregurević; Barbara Nola; Nina Violić; Goran Grgić; Nataša Dorčić; Filip Šovagović
- Cinematography: Stanko Herceg
- Edited by: Slaven Zečević
- Music by: Boris Runjić
- Release date: 1997
- Running time: 114 mins
- Country: Croatia
- Language: Croatian

Russian Meat (Croatian: Rusko meso) is a 1997 Croatian film directed by Lukas Nola.
