= Lana Barić =

Croatian actress (born 1979)

- Born: 11 December 1979 (age 46); Split, SR Croatia, SFR Yugoslavia
- Occupation: Actress
- Years active: 2001–present

Lana Barić (born 11 December 1979) is a Croatian actress. She appeared in more than twenty films since 2001.

In 2017, Lana Barić has signed the Declaration on the Common Language of the Croats, Serbs, Bosniaks and Montenegrins.

== Selected filmography ==
Year	Title	Role	Notes
2010	Mother of Asphalt		
2012	Night Boats		
2013	Hush		
2014	The Reaper		
2015	You Carry Me		
2015	Belladonna		
2020	Tereza37		
2024	This Is Not A Love Song		
