= Nina Violić =

Croatian actress

- Born: 15 March 1972 (age 54); Rijeka, SR Croatia, SFR Yugoslavia
- Education: Academy of Dramatic Art
- Alma mater: University of Zagreb
- Occupation: Actress
- Years active: 1993–present
- Spouse: Tvrtko Jurić (m. 2001)
- Children: 1

Nina Violić (born 15 March 1972) is a Croatian actress. Violić graduated from the Zagreb Academy of Dramatic Art in 1994. She has appeared in more than twenty films since 1993. She also hosted the Croatian version of the quiz show The Weakest Link in 2004.

== Selected filmography ==
Film
Year	Title	Role	Notes
1997	Russian Meat		
2002	Fine Dead Girls	Marija	
2010	On the Path		
