= Djed i baka se rastaju =

Djed i baka se rastaju is a 1996 Croatian film directed by Zvonimir Ilijić.
