= The Three Men of Melita Žganjer =

- Directed by: Snježana Tribuson
- Written by: Snježana Tribuson
- Starring: Mirjana Rogina; Goran Navojec; Suzana Nikolić; Sanja Vejnović; Ena Begović; Filip Šovagović; Ivo Gregurević; Ljubomir Kerekeš
- Cinematography: Goran Mećava
- Edited by: Marina Barac
- Music by: Darko Rundek
- Production companies: Kvadar Film; Croatian Radiotelevision
- Release date: 1998
- Running time: 97 minutes
- Country: Croatia
- Language: Croatian

The Three Men of Melita Žganjer (Croatian: Tri muškarca Melite Žganjer) is a 1998 award-winning Croatian film directed by Snježana Tribuson, who also wrote the screenplay for the film.

== Synopsis ==
The film has been described as a "lighthearted comedy" and centers on Melita Žganjer (Mirjana Rogina), a 30-something single woman who works as a vendor in a small cake shop in Zagreb. Melita is infatuated with Juan (Filip Šovagović), a character in a popular Spanish telenovela aired on local TV, and at the same time tries to get Janko (Goran Navojec), the cake delivery man, to notice her. Her affection for Janko goes unnoticed and Melita turns to Jura (Ivo Gregurević), a police officer and colleague of her roommate Eva (Sanja Vejnović). However, Melita soon finds Jura's interest in her superficial and, upon hearing that Juan would come to Zagreb to play an UNPROFOR soldier in a locally produced film dealing with the Croatian War of Independence, Melita succeeds in meeting him, but is immediately disappointed as the Spanish actor is nothing like his character in the telenovela. In the end, Melita learns that Janko likes her and ends up with him.

== Cast ==
- Mirjana Rogina as Melita Žganjer
- Goran Navojec as Janko
- Suzana Nikolić as Višnja
- Sanja Vejnović as Eva
- Ena Begović as Maria
- Filip Šovagović as Juan / Felipe Mulero
- Ivo Gregurević as Jura
- Ljubomir Kerekeš as Žac

== Awards ==
The film won five Golden Arena awards at the 1998 Pula Film Festival, including Best Screenplay (Snježana Tribuson), Best Scenography (Vladimir Domitrović), Film Editing (Marina Barac), Best Supporting Actress (Suzana Nikolić) and Best Supporting Actor (Ivo Gregurević). The film was also screened at the 2000 Cinequest Film Festival.

== See also ==
- Cinema of Croatia
