= Is It Clear, My Friend? =

2000 film directed by Dejan Aćimović

Is It Clear, My Friend? (Je li jasno, prijatelju?) is a Croatian film directed by Dejan Aćimović. It was released in 2000.
