= Celestial Body =

- Directed by: Lukas Nola
- Screenplay by: Lukas Nola
- Starring: Filip Nola; Barbara Nola; Filip Šovagović; Ivo Gregurević; Lucija Šerbedžija; Rene Bitorajac; Leona Paraminski
- Production companies: Croatian Radiotelevision; Banfilm
- Distributed by: Croatian Radiotelevision
- Release date: 2000
- Running time: 85 minutes
- Country: Croatia
- Language: Croatian

Celestial Body (Croatian: Nebo, sateliti) is a 2000 Croatian film directed by Lukas Nola. The film received four Golden Arena awards at the Pula Film Festival.

== Plot ==
The film takes place during the Croatian War of Independence. When Serbian and Croatian armies exchange captives in the middle of a minefield, a nameless man without identity and memory, subsequently named Jakov, leaves the column unnoticed and wanders around in order to minimize other people's sufferings. On his dangerous journey, he meets a female first-fighter who runs an orphanage, a commander who returned from the French Foreign Legion to run a defence line from a disco club. He goes through many other adventures only to end up in the endless backwaters of the Neretva river where war threatens to arrive.
