= Branko Schmidt =

Croatian film director

- Born: 21 September 1957 (age 68); Osijek, PR Croatia, Yugoslavia
- Years active: 1974–present

Branko Schmidt (born 21 September 1957) is a Croatian film director. His 2012 film Cannibal Vegetarian was selected as the Croatian entry for the Best Foreign Language Oscar at the 85th Academy Awards, but it did not make the final shortlist.

== Filmography ==
- Sokol Did Not Love Him (Sokol ga nije volio) (1988)
- Đuka Begović (1991)
- Vukovar: The Way Home (Vukovar se vraća kući) (1994)
- Christmas in Vienna (Božić u Beču) (1997)
- The Old Oak Blues (Srce nije u modi) (2000) - written by Goran Tribuson. With Graham Rock, Nataša Lušetić, Ivo Gregurević, Franjo Dijak and Damir Lončar. This comedy, set at the beginning of the Croatian war of Independence, revolves around a British ecologist going to Osijek to save the oldest oak tree in the world.
- Queen of the Night (Kraljica noći) (2001)
- The Melon Route (Put lubenica) (2006)
- Metastases (Metastaze) (2009)
- Vegetarian Cannibal (Ljudožder vegetarijanac) (2012)
- Ungiven (Imena višnje) (2015)
- Agape (2017)
- Demo (2020)
- A bili smo vam dobri (2021)
