= Red Dust (1999 film) =

- Directed by: Zrinko Ogresta
- Written by: Zrinko Ogresta; Goran Tribuson
- Produced by: Ivan Maloča
- Starring: Ivo Gregurević; Kristijan Ugrina; Josip Kučan; Marko Matanović; Slaven Knezović
- Cinematography: Davorin Gecl
- Edited by: Josip Podvorac
- Music by: Neven Frangeš
- Release date: October 14, 1999
- Running time: 105 minutes
- Country: Croatia
- Language: Croatian

Red Dust (Croatian: Crvena prašina) is a 1999 Croatian film directed by Zrinko Ogresta. It was Croatia's official Best Foreign Language Film submission at the 72nd Academy Awards, but did not manage to receive a nomination.

Selected for the 56th Mostra Internazionale d'Arte Cinematografica di Venezia (official section), Venezia (Italy, September 1999)

Grand Prix "Golden Anchor" Haifa's 15th International Film Festival - Haifa (Israel, September 1999)

== Plot summary ==
The film is set in a neighborhood in western Zagreb at the beginning of the 1990s, offering a dark and tragic portrayal of the community during this period of turbulent transition marked by the collapse of Yugoslavia and the rise of organized crime.

The plot centers on Crni, a 27-year-old local boxer. The central conflict begins when Crni, having fled the Yugoslav Army in 1990 after a telegram informing him of his mother's death was withheld, returns home. He disrupts the wedding of his former girlfriend, Lidija, who is marrying Boss, a local bully and coffee bar owner who controls the criminal rackets in the area.

Driven by desperation and the need to survive, Crni, aided by his car mechanic friend Škrga, gets involved in cigarette smuggling. This criminal venture unwittingly places him in direct competition with Boss's operation. Crni's boxing coach, Kirby, who is also a local policeman, tries to steer Crni away from crime by convincing him to return to boxing, attempting to protect him from both the military police and Boss.

The story takes a tragic turn when Lidija, unable to endure the abuse from Boss, leaves him. Later, a complicated and violent situation leads to her death in Crni's house. The entire narrative is seen through the eyes of Zrik, a 16-year-old apprentice of Škrga, who is the only witness to the murder. The film ultimately uses the personal tragedy of Crni and his community as a microcosm of the societal and economic breakdown occurring in Croatia just before the war.

== Cast ==
- Ivo Gregurević - Kirby
- Kristijan Ugrina - Škrga
- Josip Kučan - Crni
- Marko Matanović - Zrik
- Slaven Knezović - Boss
- Mirta Takač - Sonja
- Sandra Lončarić - Lidija
- Žarko Savić - Otac
- Ante Vican - Velecasni Grga

== Awards and nominations ==
Haifa International Film Festival

- 1999: Won, "Golden Anchor Award" - Zrinko Ogresta

Pula Film Festival

- 1999: Won, "Audience Award" - Zrinko Ogresta
- 1999: Won, "Best Direction" - Zrinko Ogresta
- 1999: Won, "Best Editing" - Josip Podvorac
- 1999: Won, "Best Screenplay" - Zrinko Ogresta
  Goran Tribuson
- 1999: Won, "Best Supporting Actor" - Ante Vican

== See also ==
- List of submissions to the 72nd Academy Awards for Best Foreign Language Film
- List of Croatian submissions for the Academy Award for Best Foreign Language Film
