= Fragments: Chronicle of a Vanishing =

- Directed by: Zrinko Ogresta
- Written by: Lada Kaštelan; Zrinko Ogresta
- Starring: Filip Šovagović; Alma Prica; Slavko Juraga
- Cinematography: Davorin Gecl
- Edited by: Josip Podvorac
- Production companies: Jadran Film; HRT
- Release date: 1991
- Running time: 97 minutes
- Country: Croatia
- Language: Croatian

Fragments: Chronicle of a Vanishing (Croatian: Krhotine - Kronika jednog nestajanja; sometimes translated as Fragments: Chronicle of a Disappearance) is a 1991 Croatian film directed by Zrinko Ogresta. The film was selected for the Awards Category Young European Film of the Year for the fourth annual European Film Awards Ceremony (Berlin, 1991).

== Cast ==
- Filip Šovagović as Ivan Livaja
- Alma Prica as Ivan's Wife
- Slavko Juraga as Lovro Livaja
- Nada Subotić
- Semka Sokolović
- Ana Karić
- Đuro Utješanović
- Ivo Gregurević
- Lena Politeo
- Božidar Orešković as Tomo Livaja
- Kruno Šarić
