= God Forbid a Worse Thing Should Happen =

- Croatian: Ne dao Bog većeg zla
- Directed by: Snježana Tribuson
- Written by: Goran Tribuson
- Based on: Ne dao Bog većeg zla by Goran Tribuson
- Starring: Luka Dragić; Mirjana Rogina; Ivo Gregurević; Goran Navojec; Semka Sokolović-Bertok
- Cinematography: Goran Trbuljak
- Music by: Darko Rundek
- Release date: 2002
- Running time: 107 min
- Country: Croatia
- Language: Croatian

God Forbid a Worse Thing Should Happen (Croatian: Ne dao Bog većeg zla) is a 2002 Croatian film directed by Snježana Tribuson. It is based on a novel of the same name by Goran Tribuson.

== Cast ==
- Luka Dragić - Frula
- Mirjana Rogina - Nevenka
- Ivo Gregurević as Branko
- Goran Navojec as Emil
- Semka Sokolović-Bertok as Ruža
- Bojan Navojec as Zumzo
- Borko Perić as Kompa
- Dora Fišter as Hana
- Hana Hegedušić as Cica
