= Each Time We Part Away =

Each Time We Part Away (Svaki put kad se rastajemo) is a Croatian film directed by Lukas Nola. It was released in 1994.
