= Queen of the Night (2001 film) =

2001 Croatian film directed by Branko Schmidt

Queen of the Night (Croatian: Kraljica noći) is a 2001 Croatian film directed by Branko Schmidt. It was Croatia's submission to the 74th Academy Awards for the Academy Award for Best Foreign Language Film, but was not accepted as a nominee.

== See also ==
- Cinema of Croatia
- List of submissions to the 74th Academy Awards for Best Foreign Language Film
