= Pula Film Festival =

Croatian film festival

Coordinates: 44.873°N 13.850°E

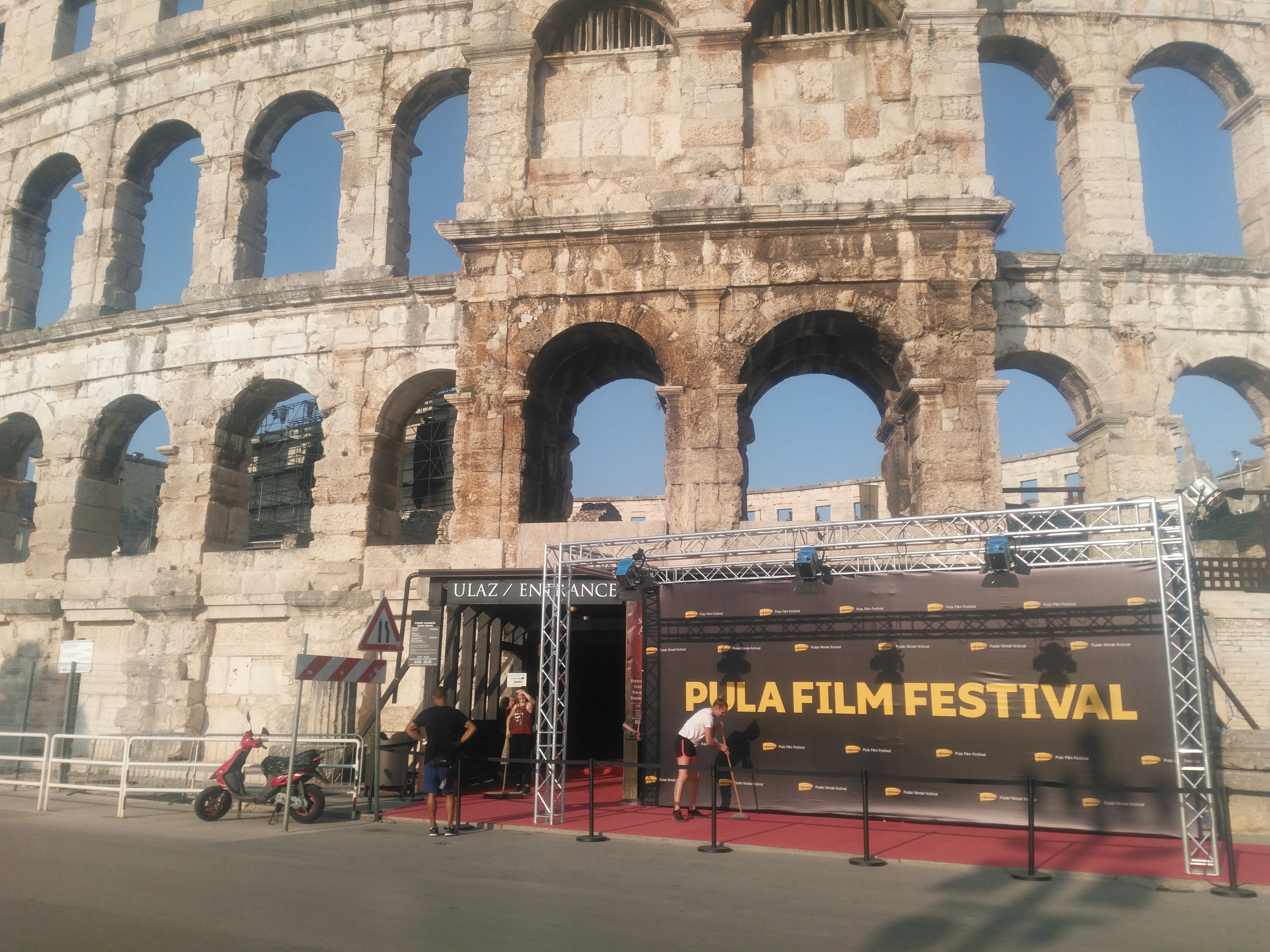
- 2021 red carpet
- Location: Pula, Croatia
- Founded: 1954
- Awards: Golden Arena
- Film titles: National and International programme
- Artistic director: Gordana Restović
- Language: Croatian (with English subtitles)
- Website: www.pulafilmfestival.hr

The Pula Film Festival (Croatian: Pulski filmski festival) is an annual Croatian film festival, established in 1954. It is held in a Roman amphitheater known as the Pula Arena. The Pula Film Festival is the largest and oldest Croatian film festival and is usually held in the summer, in July or August.

Apart from film screenings open to the public, the annual Croatian film industry awards are also traditionally presented at the festival. The awards presented at the festival (called Golden Arenas) are the main national film awards in the country.

The festival was originally started in 1954 and within a few years it became the centerpiece event of the Yugoslav film industry, with the first national awards being presented in 1957. This lasted until 1991, when the festival was cancelled due to the breakup of Yugoslavia, only to resume in 1992 as the Croatian film awards festival. It has been held every year since (with the exception of the 1994 edition, which was also cancelled).

== History ==
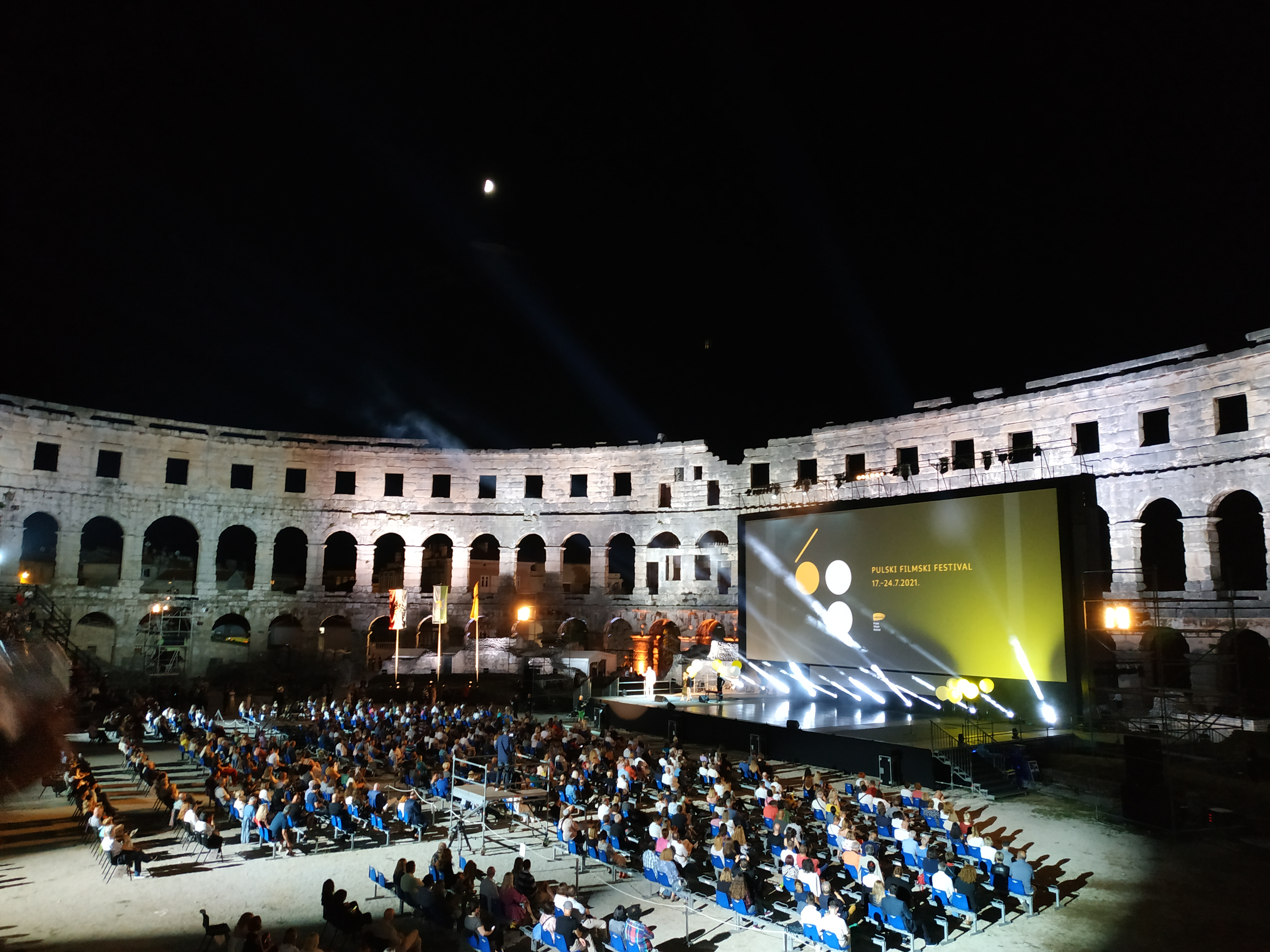
Pula Arena, the home of the festival.

In 1954, when it was established, it was known as the Festival of Yugoslav Film, and it quickly became the most important national film festival in SFR Yugoslavia. Over the following decades the festival gained considerable recognition internationally, along with the Yugoslav film industry which continued to thrive since the 1960s. Many film production companies were soon founded across the former Yugoslavia and the industry released about 20 new feature films for nationwide distribution every year. These films competed for a number of awards at the festival, since the award categories and the festival concept were modeled after the Academy Awards. However, the festival often served as a launching pad for new films before being released in cinemas nationwide, so — unlike the Academy Awards — the festival usually marked the beginning of a new season for filmgoers, not its ending.

In 1991 the festival was cancelled because of the outbreak of the war and the related breakup of Yugoslavia. In 1992 the festival was restarted, but it was renamed Filmski festival u Puli (eng: Pula Film Festival). The 1992 edition was also the first one that was dedicated solely to Croatian films, since the unified Yugoslav film industry disappeared along with the former country.

In 1995 it was renamed again and called Festival hrvatskog filma (eng: Croatian Film Festival) to emphasize its now exclusively Croatian character. However, since the Croatian film industry proved to be insufficiently productive, with only a handful of new titles being released each year, the festival's popularity rapidly plummeted. In order to rectify this, the festival opened for foreign films for the first time in its history in 2001, and was renamed once again to Festival hrvatskog i europskog filma (eng: Croatian and European Film Festival). From then on, apart from screenings of Croatian films, the festival also regularly offers an international program, as well as various one-off theme programs and retrospectives.

In 2014, the festival was rebooted by the new artistic team comprising Hrvoje Puksec, Mike Downey and Tanja Milicic. In 2015, the festival collaborated with the European Film Academy for the short program.

== Golden Arena awards ==
The national film industry awards called Golden Arena are always presented at the festival. All the locally produced feature films made in the preceding 12 months are screened at the festival and everyone involved in making them automatically qualify for the Golden Arena award in their respective category. Therefore, there are no Academy Award-style shortlists of nominees announced prior to the actual awarding ceremony. However, some festival editions in the past also had runner-up awards for some categories, called Silver Arena. The awards are given by the jury made up of prominent film critics, directors, actors, etc.

- National competition awards
  - Best Film
  - Best Director
  - Best Leading Actor
  - Best Leading Actress
  - Best Screenplay
  - Best Supporting Actor
  - Best Supporting Actress
  - Best Production Design
  - Best Cinematography
  - Best Costume Design
  - Best Film Editing
  - Best Makeup
  - Best Film Music
  - Best Sound Editing
- Other awards
  - Golden Birch (Croatian: Zlatna Breza) for best debuting director
  - Oktavijan Award given by the Croatian Film Critics' Association for best film
  - Golden Gate of Pula - Audience Award for best film as voted by festival audiences

== See also ==
- List of Croatian films
- List of Yugoslav films
