= The Man Under the Table =

- Croatian: Čovjek ispod stola
- Directed by: Neven Hitrec
- Written by: Hrvoje Hitrec
- Story by: Vjekoslav Domini
- Produced by: Ivan Maloča
- Starring: Luka Petrušić
- Cinematography: Stanko Herceg
- Edited by: Slaven Zečević
- Music by: Darko Hajsek
- Production companies: Croatian Radiotelevision; Interfilm
- Release date: 22 July 2009
- Running time: 72 minutes
- Country: Croatia
- Language: Croatian

The Man Under the Table (Croatian: Čovjek ispod stola) is a Croatian drama film, directed by Neven Hitrec, based on motifs from short stories by Vjekoslav Domini.

== Cast ==
- Luka Petrušić as Groš
- Jelena Lopatić as Lidija
- Marija Škaričić as Jasna
- Višnja Babić
- Nikša Butijer
- Inge Appelt
- Danko Ljuština
- Vera Zima
- Damir Lončar
- Ljubomir Kerekeš
- Predrag Vušović
- Filip Radoš as Argentinian
