= Josip Zovko =

Croatian actor and director (1970–2019)

- Josip Zovko
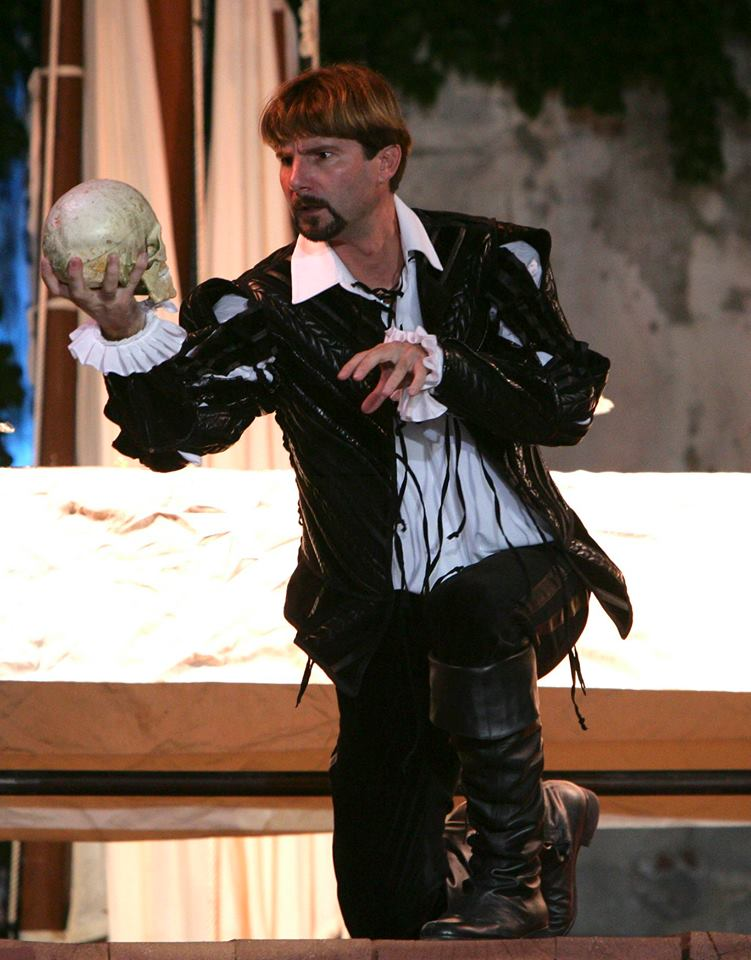
- Josip Zovko at HNK Split in 2006.
- Born: 4 June 1970; Split, SR Croatia, SFR Yugoslavia (now Croatia)
- Died: 3 April 2019 (aged 48); Grude, Bosnia and Herzegovina
- Citizenship: Croatian
- Education: Academy of Dramatic Art
- Occupation: Actor
- Years active: 1993–2019

Josip Zovko (4 June 1970 – 3 April 2019) was a Croatian actor and director. A native of the Berinovac, Lokvičići municipality in the Imotska Krajina, he was best known for playing Joze in the television series Naši i vaši. He was also acclaimed for his roles in the films Sorry for Kung Fu and Wish I Were a Shark.

== Biography and studies ==
Zovko was born on June 4, 1970, in Split. He graduated from the Academy of Dramatic Art in Zagreb, and in 1993, he became a member of the Croatian National Theater ensemble in Split, also known as HNK Split, where he played many roles. At the Theater of Split, he was a student of Mustafa Nadarević, with whom Zovko had been on the stage many times.

== Early career ==
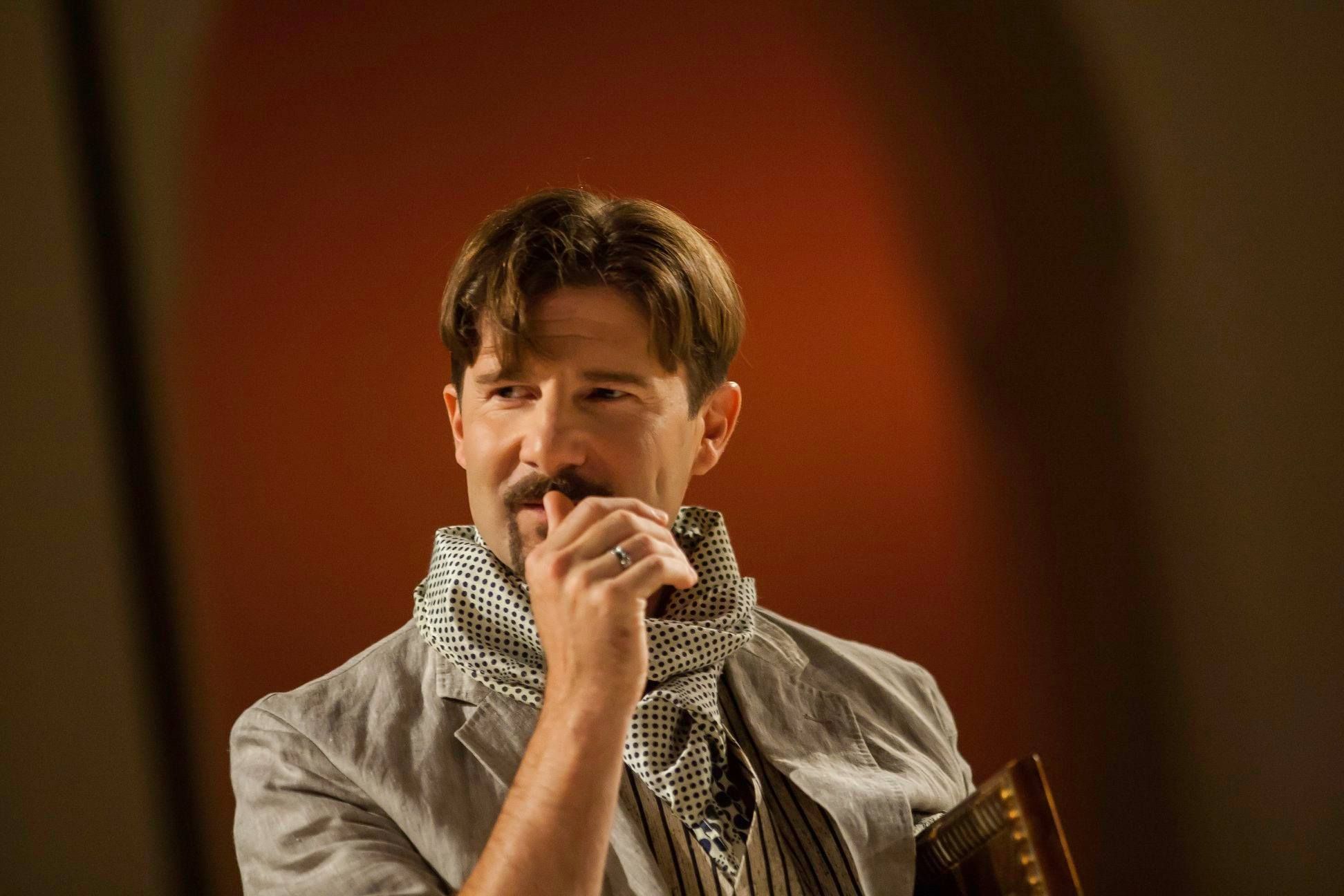
Josip Zovko in a theatre performance of William Shakespeare Timon Atenjanin as painter, 2013

Zovko's first television appearance was in 1997 in the theater play Mali libar Marka Uvodića Splićanina. He later played the character “Mate” in the movie Da mi je biti morski pas (If I could be a shark) in 1999. Zovko won several awards at the 46th Pula Film Festival. In 2001, Zovko played a main role in the movie Ante se vraća kući (Ante is Returning home). He played the character “Kole”, a student from Dalmatia. In the movie Holding, he played a smaller role as a little brother. In the same year, he played a waiter on a cruise ship in the movie Posljedna Volja (The Last Will), with fellow Croatian actor Goran Višnjić.

Zovko played the character “Jozo” in the Croatian TV series “Naši i vaši“ (Ours and Yours) (2000-2002) along with the actor Vedran Mlikota. In this series, both actors played men from “Hercegovina” who came to Zagreb. The story goes that both were under the impression that college would be easy since they knew the professor, but it turned out that they actually had to study hard to finish college. Josip Zovko also appeared in the movie Sorry for Kung Fu as „Ćaćo“ in 2004. In the TV movie Trešet from the year 2006, Josip acted as a cop named "Prekrasni Um" (Beautiful Mind). Domestic people had the desire to corrupt him and lure him to their side because they saw a benefit for themselves. In the movie Najvećoj pogrešci Alberta Einsteina (The Biggest Mistake of Albert Einstein), Josip acted as a stranger. In 2008, Josip Zovko took on a role in Bitange i Princeze. In 2009, he appeared as "Roko" in the movie Vjerujem u anđele (I believe in Angels), where Oliver Dragojević also participated. In 2011, Josip played a Yugoslav Partisan in the movie Bella Biondina. In the music video of the singer Miroslav Škoro (2003) Tamo gdje je dom (There Where the House Is) Zovko played a knight who is fighting for his homeland.

== Death ==
Josip Zovko was killed in a car crash in Grudsko Vrilo (close to Grude) in Bosnia and Herzegovina and was buried at the cemetery Sveti Ante in Lokvičići on April 6. A memorial service was held in his honor on April 12, 2019, attended by friends and acting colleagues.

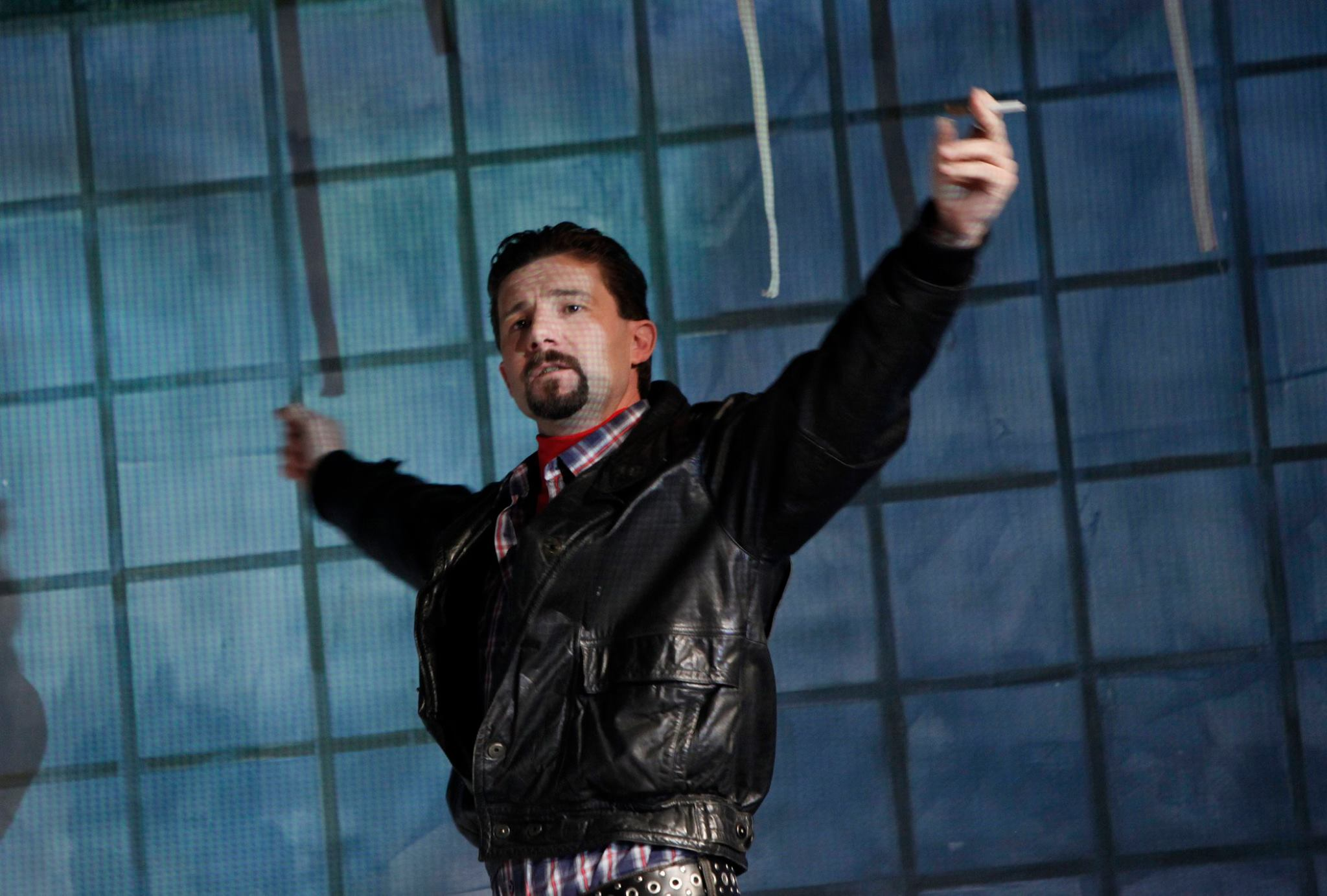
Josip Zovko in a theatre performance of Simon Bent Elling as Frank Ashley, 2010

== Filmography ==
=== Film ===
- "Bella Biondina" as Yugoslav Partisan (2011)
- "Vjerujem u anđele" as Roko (2009)
- "Najveća pogreška Alberta Einsteina" as stranger (2006)
- "Trešeta" as Beautiful Mind (2006)
- "Oprosti za kung fu" as Ćaćo (2004)
- "Posljednja volja" as waiter on a cruise ship (2001)
- "Holding" as Tein little brother (2001)
- "Ante se vraća kući" as Kole (2001)
- "Da mi je biti morski pas" as Mate (1999)
- "Mali libar Marka Uvodića Splićanina" (1997)

=== Television ===
- "Bitange i princeze" as Peraica (2008)
- "Naši i vaši" as Jozo (2001-2002)

=== Music videos ===
- Miroslav Skoro "Tamo gdje je dom" (There Where the House Is) as a knight, 2003

== Theatre HNK Split ==
- Eugène Ionesco Nosorog as Drugi građanin, Vatrogasac, Prvi čovjek, zbor), 2017
- William Shakespeare Mletački trgovac as Tubal, 2016
- Ante Tomić Čudo u poskokovoj dragi as Don Stipe, 2014
- Jean – Baptiste Poquelin Molière Učene žene as Bilježnik, 2014
- Bertolt Brecht Majka courage i njezina djeca as Vrbovnik, drugi narednik, 2013
- William Shakespeare Timon Atenjanin as Slikar, 2013
- Dino Pešut Pritisci moje generacije as Muškarac, 2013
- Milan Begović Amerikanska jahta u splitkskoj luci as Lee Prentice, 2013
- William Shakespeare Romeo i Julija as Escalo, 2012
- Ivo Brešan Svečana večera u pogrebnom poduzeću Grobar Fiki, as Bosanac, 2011 *Euripides Hekuba as Taltibije, Glasnik helenski, 2011.
- Arthur Miller Smrt trgovačkog putnika (Death of a Salesman) as Howard Wagner, 2011
- Sanja Ivić Tartuffeerie as Inspicijent, 2011
- Simon Bent Elling as Frank Ashley), 2010
- Lada Kaštelan Prije sna as Mate 2009
- Marin Držić Skup as Drijemalo, 2008
- Eduardo De Filippo Velika magija as Policijski brigadir, Gregorio, Calogerov brat, 2008
- Nina Mitrović Kad se mi mrtvi pokoljemo as Fazo, Izbjeglica, Musliman, 2007
- Tom Stoppard Rosenkranz i Guildstern su mrtvi (Rosenkrantz and Guildenstern are Dead), 2006
- Renato Baretić Osmi povjernik as Bart Kvasinožić, Muonin muž, Anthonyijev otac), 2005
- Tennessee Williams Noć iguane as Hank, 2005
- Lada Martinac Kralj, prema Ranku Marinkoviću Otok svetog ciprijana as Mićel, 2004
- Arijana Čulina Jo ča je život lip as Čep, 2004 *Tonči Petrasov Marović Antigona, kraljica u tebi as Drugi stražar, 2004.
- Ferenc Molnár Liliom as Drugi policajac, ujedno i Drugi nebeski policajac, 2004
- Jean-Baptiste Poquelin Molière Don Juan as Gusman, Elvirin konjušar), 2003
- Sergi Belbel Poslije kiše as Informatički programmer, 2003.
- Bernard-Marie Koltès Roberto Zucco as Drugi čuvar, inspektor, drugi policajac, 2002
- Vlaho Stulli Kate Kapuralica as Manoval, Vlaj, 2002
- Tennessee Williams Tetovirana ruža / Serafin Splićanka as Doktor, 2001
- Edmond Rostand Cyrano de Bergerac as Christian de Neuvillette, 2000
- Sophocles Antigona as Hemon, 2000
- Luigi Pirandello Šest lica traži Autora as Sin, 2000
- Ivan Leo Lemo – Ana Tonković Dolenčić Plinska boca as Svećenik, 2000
- Arsen Dedić Kuća pored Mora, ballet as interpretator, 2000
- Mate Matišić Svećenikova djeca as Don Šimun, 1999
- William Shakespeare Na tri kralja as Antonio, pomorski kapetan, 1999
- Anton Pavlovič Čehov Galeb as Ilja Afanasjevič Šamrajev, Upravnik kod Sorina), 1998
- Fjodor Mihajlovič Dostojevski Braća Karamazovi as Rakitin, 1998
- Dubravko Mihanović Bijelo as Mali, 1998
- Antun Šoljan Tarampesta / Mototor as Marino), 1997
- Ray Cooney Pokvarenjak as Ronnie, 1997
- William Shakespeare Kralj Lear as Francuski kralj, 1997
- Jean-Baptiste Poquelin Molière Tartuffe as Valere, 1996
- Ivan Antun Nenadić Kako je izdan Isus as Apostol Ivan, 1996
- Carlo Goldoni Posljednja noć karnevala as Redatelj, 1996
- Ivo Brešan Julije Cezar as Tinko Metikoš, 1995
- John Webster Vojvotkinja Malfeška as Grisolan, dvorjanin, sluga, ubojica, 1995
- Sophocles Edip as Mladić, 1994
- Hugo von Hofmannsthal Svatković as Susjed siromah, 1994
- Joseph Kesselring Arsen i stara Čipka as Klein, policajac, 1994
- William Shakespeare Hamlet as Drugi glumac, 1994
- Miroslav Krleža Saloma as Ađutant, Pjesnik, Kuhar, 1993
- Lada Martinac - Snježana Sinovčić Živim as Grof, 1993
- Claudio Magris Stadelmann as Konobar, 1992
- Tomislav Bakarić Smrt Stjepana Radića as Narodni zastupnici, 1992
- Ray Cooney Kidaj od svoje žene as Fotograf, 1992
- Muka spasitelja našega as Anđeli i alegorije, 1991
- Euripides Helena, 1990.

== Performances outside Split Theatre ==
- Mail Libar Marka Uvodića Splićanina, GKM Split
- performance Ilija Zovko, regie / direction Josip Zovko, GKM Split

== Film awards and special honors ==
- Croatian actress prize for role of Mate in TV movie To be a shark, directed by Ognjen Sviličić, 2000.
- Award Veljko Maričić at the International Small Scene Festival for the role of Little in the performance of Bijelo Dubravko Mihanović, directed by John Leo Leme, 1998.
