= What Iva Recorded =

- Promotional still
- Directed by: Tomislav Radić
- Written by: Tomislav Radić; Ognjen Sviličić
- Starring: Anja Šovagović-Despot; Ivo Gregurević; Boris Svrtan; Masha Mati Prodan; Barbara Prpić; Karl Menrad; Adam Končić
- Cinematography: Vedran Šamanović
- Edited by: Kruno Kušec
- Release date: 21 July 2005
- Running time: 92 minutes
- Country: Croatia
- Language: Croatian

What Iva Recorded (Croatian: Što je Iva snimila 21. listopada 2003., lit. What Iva Recorded On 21 October 2003) is a 2005 Croatian comedy-drama film directed by Tomislav Radić. The plot is told from the perspective of a camcorder, the birthday present of Iva, a teenage girl played by Masha Mati Prodan in her film debut, leading to a mockumentary-style footage. The film was very well received by critics, winning five awards, including the Big Golden Arena for Best Film at the Pula Film Festival. It was seen as a welcome change, compared to Radić's previous work.

== Plot ==
Iva (Mati Prodan) lives in a middle-class family in Zagreb, Croatia. She receives a digital camcorder as a present for her 14th birthday, which she uses to film the events in the family apartment during the rest of the day. The film is shown from the perspective of her camcorder. Her mother, Željka (Šovagović-Despot), is a perfectionist housewife who deals with her problems by drinking. Božo (Gregurević), Iva's stepfather, is a dimwitted entrepreneur who likes to bark out commands to the family members, but is a sycophant at work. He organises a family dinner to invite his business partner, a German named Hoffman (Menrad), to negotiate a big business deal, Iva's birthday being a handy excuse to do so.

Darko (Svrtan), Iva's happy-go-lucky uncle, arrives and is fascinated by the camcorder. Nobody in the house can communicate with Hoffman as nobody speaks German, so Darko invites a friend, Nina (Prpić), who is purportedly a polyglot. She charms Hoffman, but the family is shocked to discover that she is actually an escort lady. Željka begins to show open animosity towards her, while Božo accepts it much more stoically. When Željka accidentally spills the family dinner on Nina's clothes, the group decides to visit a restaurant. Hoffman has a good time at the restaurant and shows sexual interest in Željka; Božo ignores this. Nevertheless, when he discovers Hoffman gave her the number of his hotel room, Božo angrily takes off after him. He is too late, as Hoffman has already left in a taxi. Exhausted, the family returns home late in the evening and Iva turns off the camcorder.

== Cast ==
- Anja Šovagović-Despot as Željka
- Ivo Gregurević as Božo
- Boris Svrtan as Darko
- Masha Mati Prodan as Iva
- Barbara Prpić as Nina
- Karl Menrad as Hoffman
- Adam Končić as the Waiter

== Reception ==
Unlike most Croatian films from the 1990s onwards, What Iva Recorded was lauded by critics. Jakov Kosanović wrote for Slobodna Dalmacija that the film was "direct, full of life and often funny", and "a refreshment, compared to the current work of the older generation of Croatian directors". He also lauded the camcorder technique. Damir Radić of Nacional compared the film to the Dogme 95 movement, known for its use of camcorder. He called What Iva Recorded the best Croatian film since the independence of Croatia in the 1990s. The only problem of the film, according to him, was not enough emphasis on the character of Iva. Damir Radić considered Tomislav Radić an unlikely director of a masterpiece, due to the critical panning of his previous films, Anđele moj dragi (lit. My Dear Angel) and The Miroslav Holding Co.

52nd Pula Film Festival
Big Golden Arena for Best Film
Golden Arena for Best Director (Tomislav Radić)
Golden Arena for Best Actor (Ivo Gregurević)
Golden Arena for Best Actress (Anja Šovagović-Despot)
Croatian Film Critics' Association
Oktavijan Award
