= Golden Arena for Best Actor =

- Awarded for: "Performance by an actor in a leading role"
- Country: Yugoslavia (1955–1990); Croatia (1992–present)
- Presented by: Pula Film Festival Jury
- First award: 1955
- Currently held by: Rene Bitorajac (2021)
- Website: Official Website

The Golden Arena awards were established in 1955 as the Yugoslav national film awards, presented annually at the Pula Film Festival. From 1955 to 1990 the awards were given for highest achievements in Yugoslav cinema. In 1991 the festival was cancelled due to the breakup of Yugoslavia, only to resume in 1992 as the Croatian film awards festival. It has been held every year since (with the exception of the 1994 edition which was also cancelled).

Since each Pula Film Festival includes screenings of all the locally produced feature films made in the preceding 12 months (which is made possible due to the local film industry's relatively low output), everyone involved in making them is considered automatically qualified for the Golden Arena award. Therefore there are no Academy Award-style shortlists of nominees announced prior to the actual awarding ceremony, although some festival editions did award runner-up acting awards, called Silver Arena.

The awards are given by the jury of five or six members, usually consisting of prominent filmmakers and film critics. Some festival editions also had Best Actor winners as voted by audiences, but these are not considered Golden Arena awards. Also, in the 1950s and 1960s awards in the acting category were given for actors' whole body of work in the preceding year so some of the more prolific recipients are officially listed as having won the Golden Arena award for several films made that year.

== List of winners ==
The following is a list of winners of the Golden Arena for Best Actor at the Pula Film Festival.

=== Yugoslav competition (1955–1990) ===
Year	Winner	English title(s)	Original title(s)
1955	Stane Sever	Moments of Decision	Trenutki odločitve
1956	Bert Sotlar (shared)	Don't Look Back, My Son	Ne okreći se sine
1956	Ljuba Tadić (shared)	Big and Small	Veliki i mali
1957	Mladen Šerment	Master of His Own Body	Svoga tela gospodar
1958	Pavle Vuisić		Tri koraka u prazno
1959	Petre Prličko	Miss Stone	Mis Ston
1960	Antun Vrdoljak	Atomic War Bride	Rat
1961	Miha Baloh		Veselica
1962	Mija Aleksić		Dr
1963	Slobodan Perović	Men	Muškarci
1964	Ljuba Tadić	The March to River Drina	Marš na Drinu
1965	Bata Živojinović	Three; The Enemy	Tri; Sovražnik
1966	Antun Nalis (shared)	Looking Into the Eyes of the Sun	Pogled u zjenicu sunca
1966	Relja Bašić (shared)	Rondo	Rondo
1967	Bata Živojinović	I Even Met Happy Gypsies; The Birch Tree; The Feast	Skupljači perja Breza; Praznik
1968	Ljuba Tadić	Before the Truth; Wolf of Prokletije	Pre istine Vuk sa Prokletija
1969	Boris Dvornik	When You Hear the Bells; The Bridge	Kad čuješ zvona Most
1970	Stevo Žigon	Oxygen	Oxygen
1971	Darko Damevski	Black Seed	Crno seme
1972	Bata Živojinović	The Master and Margaret; Traces of a Black Haired Girl	Maestro i Margarita; Tragovi crne devojke
1973	Ljubiša Samardžić	A Performance of Hamlet in the Village of Mrdusa Donja; The Battle of Sutjeska	Bombaši; Predstava Hamleta u Mrduši Donjoj; Sutjeska
1974	Dragomir Bojanić	The Wedding	Svadba
1975	Ljuba Tadić	Fear	Strah; Doktor Mladen
1976	Radko Polič	Idealist	Idealist
1977	Pavle Vuisić	Manhunt; Beasts; The Written Off Return	Hajka; Beštije; Povratak otpisanih
1978	Rade Šerbedžija	Bravo Maestro	Bravo maestro
1979	Boris Dvornik	The Return	Povratak
1980	Ljubiša Samardžić		Rad na određeno vreme
1981	Dragan Nikolić	The Falcon	Banović Strahinja
1982	Ljubiša Samardžić	Savamala	Savamala
1983	Miki Manojlović	Something In-Between	Nešto između
1984	Danilo Stojković	Balkan Spy	Balkanski špijun
1985	Miki Manojlović	When Father Was Away on Business	Otac na službenom putu
1986	Rade Šerbedžija	Evening Bells	Večernja zvona
1987	Žarko Laušević	Officer with a Rose	Oficir s ružom
1988	Mustafa Nadarević	The Glembays	Glembajevi
1989	Janez Hočevar	Cafe Astoria	Kavana Astoria
1990	Branislav Lečić	Silent Gunpowder	Gluvi barut

=== Croatian competition (1992–present) ===
Year	Winner	English film title	Original film title
1991	Festival was cancelled.		
1992	Sven Lasta	The Murmur of the Shell	Školjka šumi
1993	Ilija Ivezić	The Golden Years	Zlatne godine
1994	Award ceremony was cancelled.		
1995	Filip Šovagović	Washed Out	Isprani
1996	Rene Medvešek	The Seventh Chronicle	Sedma kronika
1997	Sven Medvešek	Mondo Bobo	Mondo Bobo
1998	Filip Šovagović (2)	Transatlantic	Transatlantik
1999	Ivo Gregurević	Madonna	Bogorodica
2000	Ilija Ivezić (2)	Marshal Tito's Spirit	Maršal
2001	Filip Šovagović (3)	Slow Surrender	Polagana predaja
2002	Ivo Gregurević (2)	Fine Dead Girls	Fine mrtve djevojke
2003	Zlatko Crnković	Here	Tu
2004	Goran Višnjić	Long Dark Night	Duga mračna noć
2005	Ivo Gregurević (3)	What Iva Recorded	Što je Iva snimila 21. listopada 2003.
2006	Krešimir Mikić	The Melon Route	Put lubenica
2007	Emir Hadžihafizbegović	Armin	Armin
2008	Alen Liverić	No One's Son	Ničiji sin
2009	Rene Bitorajac	Metastases	Metastaze
2010	Rade Šerbedžija (3); Tony Grga	72 Days, The Abandoned	Sedamdeset i dva dana, Ostavljeni
2011	Draško Zidar	Kotlovina	Kotlovina
2012	Rene Bitorajac (2)	Cannibal Vegetarian	Ljudožder vegetarijanac
2013	Bogdan Diklić	A Stranger	Obrana i zaštita
2014	Ivo Gregurević (4)	The Reaper	Kosac
2015	Emir Hadžihafizbegović (2)	These Are the Rules	Takva su pravila
2016	Lazar Ristovski	On the Other Side	S one strane
2017	Nebojša Glogovac	The Constitution	Ustav Republike Hrvatske
2018	Janko Popović Volarić	Comic Sans	Comic Sans
2019	Krešimir Mikić (2)	What a Country!	Koja je ovo država
2020	Rade Šerbedžija (4)	Fishing and Fisherman's Conversations	Ribanje i ribarsko prigovaranje
2021	Rene Bitorajac (3)	Once We Were Good for You	A bili smo vam dobri
2022	Stojan Matavulj	The Staffroom	Zbornica
2023	Goran Marković	Safe Place	Sigurno mjesto
2024	Bernard Tomić	Celebration	Proslava
2025	Filip Šovagović (4)	Good Children	Dobra djeca
2026	Dado Ćosić	Beautiful Evening, Beautiful Day	Lijepa večer, lijep dan

== Multiple winners ==
The following actors have received multiple awards. The list is sorted by the number of total awards. Years in bold indicate wins in Yugoslavian competition (1955–1990).

- 4 : Ljuba Tadić (**1956**, **1964**, **1968**, **1975**)
- 4 : Ivo Gregurević (1999, 2002, 2005, 2014)
- 4 : Filip Šovagović (1995, 1998, 2001, 2025)
- 4 : Rade Šerbedžija (**1978**, **1986**, 2010, 2020)
- 3 : Bata Živojinović (**1965**, **1967**, **1972**)
- 3 : Ljubiša Samardžić (**1973**, **1980**, **1982**)
- 3 : Rene Bitorajac (2009, 2012, 2021)
- 2 : Pavle Vuisić (**1958**, **1977**)
- 2 : Boris Dvornik (**1969**, **1979**)
- 2 : Miki Manojlović (**1983**, **1985**)
- 2 : Ilija Ivezić (1993, 2000)
- 2 : Emir Hadžihafizbegović (2007, 2015)
- 2 : Krešimir Mikić (2006, 2019)
