= Sleep Sweet, My Darling =

- Directed by: Neven Hitrec
- Written by: Hrvoje Hitrec
- Produced by: Ivan Maloca
- Starring: Ljubomir Kerekes
- Cinematography: Stanko Herceg
- Edited by: Slaven Zecevic
- Music by: Darko Hajsek
- Release date: 22 July 2005
- Running time: 110 minutes
- Country: Croatia
- Language: Croatian

Sleep Sweet, My Darling (Croatian: Snivaj, zlato moje) is a Croatian comedy film directed by Neven Hitrec. It was released in 2005 and was entered into the 28th Moscow International Film Festival.

== Cast ==
- Ljubomir Kerekeš - Darko Skrinjar
- Ivan Glowatzky - Tomica
- Ines Bojanić - Tonka
- Ozren Grabarić - Professor Laslo
- Alan Malnar - Tomica
- Franka Kos - Janja Bartolic
- Vlatko Dulić - Djed
- Višnja Babić - Mira Skrinjar
- Ksenija Marinković - Teta Nadica
- Marija Kohn - Neda Glazar
- Danko Ljuština - Djed Ladovic
