= Violation (film) =

2020 horror film

- Official poster
- Directed by: Madeleine Sims-Fewer; Dusty Mancinelli
- Written by: Madeleine Sims-Fewer; Dusty Mancinelli
- Produced by: Madeleine Sims-Fewer; Dusty Mancinelli
- Starring: Madeleine Sims-Fewer; Anna Maguire; Jesse LaVercombe; Obi Abili; Jasmin Geljo; Cynthia Ashperger
- Cinematography: Adam Crosby
- Edited by: Gabriella Wallace
- Music by: Andrea Boccadoro
- Production companies: One Plus One; MPI Media Group
- Distributed by: Shudder
- Release dates: September 14, 2020 (TIFF); March 25, 2021 (Shudder)
- Running time: 107 minutes
- Country: Canada
- Language: English

Violation is a 2020 Canadian horror drama film directed and written by Madeleine Sims-Fewer and Dusty Mancinelli. It is the feature film debut of the two directors, who have collaborated on several short films displayed at film festivals worldwide. The plot follows Miriam, who seeks revenge on her brother-in-law after a traumatic incident. The film stars Madeleine Sims-Fewer, Anna Maguire, Jesse LaVercombe, Obi Abili, Jasmin Geljo, and Cynthia Ashperger.

The film premiered at the 2020 Toronto International Film Festival. It had its US premiere at the 2021 Sundance Film Festival on February 1, 2021.

== Plot ==
Unhappy married couple Miriam and Caleb drive to the secluded home of Miriam's sister Greta and her husband Dylan to help prepare for Dylan's upcoming family reunion. Despite tension between Miriam and Caleb, they have an easy rapport with Greta and Dylan, who has known the sisters since high school. Greta privately offers Miriam marital advice, and Miriam implies that she envies Greta's successful marriage. Later, during a drunken campfire conversation after the others have gone to bed, Miriam kisses Dylan, then apologizes and reveals her marital problems and insecurities, to which Dylan is sympathetic.

Early the next morning, Dylan begins sexually assaulting Miriam while she is asleep. She wakes and implores him to stop, but he persists. Miriam then wanders into the forest, where she encounters a wolf carrying a slain rabbit. She returns to the cabin and initiates sex with Caleb, but he rebuffs her. She later confronts Dylan about the assault, but he denies responsibility, claims that she wanted to have sex with him, and assures her that he will not tell Greta what happened.

During a swim in a nearby lake, Miriam tells Greta about the assault, but Greta refuses to believe her and suggests that Miriam is trying to cover up an attempted seduction of Dylan. That night, while the group prepares for dinner, Dylan tells Greta that he slept on the couch after the night by the campfire, upsetting Miriam, who behaves aggressively towards the group and embarrasses Caleb by claiming that he secretly dislikes Dylan and Greta.

The day before the family reunion, Miriam lures Dylan to a guest cabin on the pretext of another sexual encounter. She convinces him to strip naked and be blindfolded, asking him what it felt like to assault her, then bludgeons him unconscious. She ties him to a chair and duct-tapes a plastic bag around his head. As he begins to suffocate, she tears the bag out of remorse. Dylan headbutts her and breaks his restraints. After a struggle, Miriam finally chokes him to death, crying afterward.

Miriam collects Dylan's blood in containers, dismembers his corpse, and saves some of the bones, which she later pulverizes with a sledgehammer. After clearing evidence from the scene, she burns the rest of the body and scatters the ashes across the water. She then dons a wig and travels to a motel, where she encounters a couple arguing. She interjects and loudly rebukes the man, much to the couple's surprise. In her motel room, Miriam pours the corpse's blood down the bathtub drain and cleans the tub.

On the day of the family reunion, Miriam makes final preparations with Greta, who is furious about Dylan's unexplained absence. Miriam describes a dream in which she discovered Greta hanging from a belt and felt guilty for not responding sooner, to which Greta responds with disgust. Miriam insists that Dylan is not the right partner for Greta, which prompts Greta to claim that she only invited Miriam and Caleb at Dylan's suggestion and that Miriam is self-righteous and overprotective. Miriam makes ice cream for the reunion by herself, secretly adding Dylan's powdered bone to the mix. Greta rejoins Miriam after calming down and asks her if she survived in Miriam's dream. Miriam responds that she tried to hold Greta up and offer words of reassurance, wanting her last experience to be one of love rather than panic. Greta tearfully assures Miriam that she loves her. During the reunion, Greta sits beside Miriam, and, along with many of Dylan's relatives, enjoys an ice cream cone while Miriam quietly cries.

== Cast ==
- Madeleine Sims-Fewer as Miriam
- Anna Maguire as Greta
- Jesse LaVercombe as Dylan
- Obi Abili as Caleb
- Jasmin Geljo as Ivan
- Cynthia Ashperger as Jelena

== Production ==
Deepa Mehta, whom Mancinelli had worked for as an assistant, served as executive producer, along with David Hamilton, François Dagenais and David James.

== Release ==
The film had its world premiere at the 2020 Toronto International Film Festival in the section Midnight Madness on September 14, 2020. The film also premiered at the 2021 Sundance Film Festival on February 1, 2021, in the Midnight section. In December 2020, streaming service Shudder announced it had purchased streaming rights for the film. It was released on Shudder on March 25, 2021.

== Reception ==
=== Critical response ===
On Rotten Tomatoes, the film has an approval rating of 88% based on reviews from 99 critics, with an average rating of 7.1/10. The website's critics consensus reads, "Violation presents a powerful depiction of one woman's trauma -- and its uncomfortably gripping aftermath." Metacritic, which uses a weighted average, assigned the film a score of 70 out of 100, based on 11 critics, indicating "generally favorable" reviews.

Violation, which is described as "decidedly dark, potentially dangerous and probably deranged" and "flips the revenge genre on its head", was selected for the "Fantastic 7" genre festival initiative to highlight genre films at seven international film festivals. Critic Mike Crisolago has named it one of 30 films he is already "excited to see." Now Toronto critic Norman Wilner called it "a major levelling up of their signature combination of rage and intensity". According to Variety reviewer Tomris Laffley, "Despite some heavy-handed choices, Madeleine Sims-Fewer and Dusty Mancinelli pack a profound gut-punch with their debut feature."

=== Awards and nominations ===
The film received five Canadian Screen Award nominations at the 9th Canadian Screen Awards in 2021, for Best Actress (Sims-Fewer), Best Supporting Actor (LaVercombe), Best Sound Editing (Matthew Chan, Ida Marci), Best Sound Mixing (Matthew Chan) and the John Dunning Best First Feature Award.

- TIFF Rising Star - Madeleine Sims-Fewer
- Emerging Canadian Artist Award - Calgary International Film Festival
- Emerging Canadian Director Award - Vancouver International Film Festival
- ACTRA Awards - Outstanding Performance - Jesse LaVercombe
- Directors Guild of Canada Discovery Award (nominee)
- Vancouver Film Critics Circle Awards (nominee): Best Picture, Best Director, Best Actor - Madeleine Sims-Fewer
