= S.P.U.K. =

S.P.U.K. AKA Sreća Pojedinca - Uspjeh Kolektiva
- Directed by: Milivoj Puhlovski
- Written by: Hrvoje Hitrec
- Story by: Nenad Burcar; Pero Kvesic
- Starring: Damir Saban; Cintija Asperger; Danko Ljustina; Zvonimir Juric
- Cinematography: Enes Midzic
- Edited by: Robert Lisjak
- Production companies: Zagreb Film; Kinematografi
- Release date: December 12, 1983 (Yugoslavia)
- Running time: 99 minutes
- Country: Yugoslavia
- Language: Serbo-Croatian

S.P.U.K. (Long title: Sreća Pojedinca - Uspjeh Kolektiva ) is a 1983 Serbo-Croatian language Yugoslavian comedy film written by Hrvoje Hitrec and directed by Milivoj Puhlovski.

== Plot ==
The Government's Sava Commander wants his youth labor brigade to be the best, but this goal seems difficult to reach when he sees graffiti being repeated all over his area of command. The Commander begins to hunt for the graffiti makers, but they are difficult to find and stop.

== Cast ==
- Damir Šaban as Lovro
- Cintija Ašperger as Vlasta
- Danko Ljuština as Vlado
- Zvonimir Jurić as Kuhar
- Radoslav Spitzmuller as Boro
- Elizabeta Kukić as Koka
- Branimir Vidić as Mrva
- Predrag 'Pređo' Vušović as Redford
- Vili Matula as Ninđa
- Pjer Zardin as Clapton
- Mario Mirković as Mišo
- Anja Šovagović-Despot as Bolničarka
- Ivanišević Nedeljko as Bilder
- Tanja Mazele as Zita
- Borivoj Zimonja as Radio-voditelj
- Tomislav Lipljin as Liječnik
- Milan Plećaš as Sekretar
- Otokar Levaj as Ličilac
- Slavica Knežević as Seksolog
- Đuro Utješanović as Dermatolog
- Mladen Crnobrnja as Sociolog
- Đuro Crnobrnja as Kino-operator
- Zdenka Trach as Teta
- Željko Haberstok as Ribić
- Željka Galler as Redfordova djevojka
- Emira Filipović as Zvjezdana
- Mehdi Jashari as Medo / Dobrovoljac
- Ranko Vujisić as Recitator
- Zlatko Rado as Dežurni
- Mirko Sušić as Pomoćnik
- Vlasta Klemenc as Miss
- Slobodanka Burcel as Boba

== Reception ==
The film was shot in an era when once very popular youth work actions were waning in Yugoslavia, and its exploitation formula of youth comedy mixed with eroticism was unsuccessful with the critics and the cinemagoers alike.
