= Ferić =

Ferić is a surname, an Italianised version of the Croatian Gvozdenica. Notable people with the surname include:

- Đuro Ferić (1739–1820), Croatian poet and Jesuit
- Nikola Ferić (1736–1819), Croatian Catholic bishop
- Mirosław Ferić (1915–1942), Polish World War II flying ace
- Zoran Ferić (born 1961), Croatian writer and columnist
