= Ruža na asfaltu =

Ruža na asfaltu (The Asphalt Rose)
- Cover page of the program booklet
- Music: Darko Hajsek
- Lyrics: Darko Hajsek; Ladislav Prežigalo
- Book: Igor Weidlich
- Productions: 2007 Croatian Production

Ruža na asfaltu (The Asphalt Rose) is a Croatian musical with a book by Igor Weidlich, music by Darko Hajsek and lyrics by Darko Hajsek and Ladislav Prežigalo. It premiered at Zagreb's Komedija Theatre in October 2007.

Following a string of Komedija Theatre's foreign musical hits (such as Hair, Jesus Christ Superstar and Chicago), Ruža na asfaltu was, at the time of its opening, the first original Croatian musical in more than a decade to be performed at the theatre.

== Synopsis ==
In the suburbs of a big city, while Trenk is lamenting the fact that his girlfriend has left him for another woman, his friend Tvrtko meets Ružica and falls madly in love with her. Ružica seems to feel the same way; however, she is only in the city for a short while to visit her cousin Krešo and must soon go back to the country. There, she is set to enter into an arranged marriage to a man she doesn't love. When Ružica returns to the country, Tvrtko and his friends go after her, determined to bring her back with them. Once there, they soon begin to realize that the traditionalist world of Ružica's village might be more difficult to leave than they had expected.

== Characters and original cast ==
Trenk (Ervin Baučić / Vladimir Tintor)
Boy from the suburbs whose girlfriend has just left him for another woman
Tvrtko (Dražen Bratulić / Branko Glad)
Boy from the suburbs, falls in love with Ružica
Dora (Vlatka Burić / Lana Blaće)
Trenk's ex-girlfriend, left him for Meri
Meri (Željka Veverec / Tina Rupčić)
Dora's girlfriend
Krešo (Ivica Pucar / Boris Barberić)
Ružica's cousin, hails from the country but has made a life for himself in the city
Sponzoruša (Jelena Burić)
Krešo's gold-digging girlfriend

Ružica (Mila Elegović / Danijela Pintarić)
Country girl, wants to escape to the city
Euzebije (Adam Končić / Boris Barberić)
Ružica's fiancé
Stipe (Adalbert Turner Juci)
Ružica's father
Vrač Lovro (Goran Malus)
Traditionalist leader of the village community
Beatrice (Dražen Čuček)
"The loveliest flower of the rural county"

== Song list ==
Act I

- Overture ^{*}
- "San ljetne noći (Instrumental)"
- "Savršeni svijet" — Trenk, Tvrtko and Company
- "Nek' je zora budi" — Dora, Meri, Trenk, Tvrtko and Company
- "Ej, da možeš moja biti" — Tvrtko, Krešo and Company
- "San ljetne noći" — Tvtko and Trenk ^{*}
- "Svake duge zime" — Ružica and Ptica
- "Još uvijek čekam te" — Tvrtko, Ružica and Trenk ^{*}
- "Već se budi dan" — Company
- "Zato pusti ga" — Meri, Dora and Company
- "Srce moje za tobom gine" — Tvrtko and Trenk
- "Vještica i raspikuća" — Trenk and Company ^{*}
- "Odlazim" — Tvrtko and Company ^{*}
- "Bit ćeš tu" — Company

Act II

- "Sjedim tu k'o nekad pokraj rijeke" — Company
- "Oj ti luče, poriluče" — Vrač Lovro, Stipe and Company
- "Kad si kraj mene ti" — Ružica and Tvrtko
- "Beatrice" — Beatrice and Company
- "Uha bez sluha" — Ružica
- "I nikad više" — Euzebije, Tvrtko and Company ^{*}
- "Zajdi, zajdi" — Tvrtko, Ružica and Company
- "Isto sunce za sve nas" — Company ^{*}

^{*} Songs omitted from the abridged Bundek version.

== Production history ==
=== Original production ===
The original production of the show, directed by Marko Juraga, choreographed by Igor Barberić and musically directed by Krešimir Batinić, opened at Zagreb's Komedija Theatre on October 27, 2007. The musical received mixed reviews: Vjesnik called it "dynamic and alive", while Zarez commended the passion of everyone involved, criticized the lack of quality in the actors' performances, but ultimately declared the musical "hilariously amusing because of being bad".

Although Vjesnik described the opening night audience response as "enthusiastic", the lack of audience interest caused the musical to play its final performance on April 14, 2008.

=== Abridged Bundek production ===
Ruža na asfaltu was performed once more on June 28, 2008, as a part of Komedija Theatre's free concert series given at Zagreb's Bundek Lake. Originally planned as a two-evening event, one performance was ultimately canceled because of bad weather.

A shortened version of the show was performed at this venue, with most of the dialogue and several songs cut.
