= Foreign accent syndrome =

- Specialty: Psychiatry, Neurology

Foreign accent syndrome is an extremely rare medical condition in which patients develop speech patterns that are perceived as a foreign accent that is different from their native accent, without having acquired it in the perceived accent's place of origin.

Foreign accent syndrome usually results from a stroke, but can also develop from head trauma, migraines or developmental problems. The condition might occur due to lesions in the speech production network of the brain, or may also be considered a neuropsychiatric condition. The condition was first reported in 1907, and between 1941 and 2009 there were 62 recorded cases.

Its symptoms result from distorted articulatory planning and coordination processes, and although popular news articles commonly attempt to identify the closest regional accent, speakers with foreign accent syndrome acquire neither a specific foreign accent nor any additional fluency in a foreign language. There has been no verified case where a patient's foreign language skills have improved after a brain injury.

== Signs and symptoms ==
To the untrained ear, those with the syndrome sound as though they speak their native languages with a foreign accent; for example, a speaker of British English may be perceived as speaking English with an Italian accent. Contrary to popular belief, individuals with FAS do not exhibit their accent without any effort. Instead, these individuals feel as if they have a speech disorder. More recently, there is mounting evidence that the cerebellum, which controls motor function, may be crucially involved in some cases of foreign accent syndrome, reinforcing the notion that speech pattern alteration is mechanical and thus non-specific.

Generally, FAS is not a persisting disorder; it is a temporary stage in recovery from stroke or trauma or potentially a stage of deterioration. FAS mainly affects speech at a segmental or prosodic level. Vowels are more likely to be affected than consonants. Vowel errors include an increase in vowel tensing, monophthongization of diphthongs, and vowel fronting and raising. There is evidence of both vowel shortening and lengthening. Consonantal anomalies include cases of changes in articulation, manner, and voicing.

On a suprasegmental level, there are changes in intonation and pitch, such as monotonous intonation or exaggerations in pitch height and range. There are also difficulties in using stress accents to indicate pragmatics and meaning. There is a tendency for FAS patients to switch to syllable-timed prosody when their native language is stress-timed. This perception could be due to changes in syllable durations, and the addition of epenthetic vowels.

FAS has many similarities to apraxia of speech (AoS), which is another motor speech disorder. Some researchers think that FAS is a mild form of AoS because they are both caused by similar lesions in the brain. FAS differs from AoS in that FAS patients have more control over their speech deficits and their "foreign accent" is a form of compensation for their speech problems. Because there are relatively few differences in the symptoms of FAS and AoS, a listener's perception of the affected speech plays a large role in diagnosis of FAS rather than AoS. The listener has to be familiar with a foreign accent in order to attribute it to the affected speech of someone with FAS.

The perception of a foreign accent is likely to be a case of pareidolia on the part of the listener. Nick Miller, Professor of Motor Speech Disorders at Newcastle University has explained: "The notion that sufferers speak in a foreign language is something that is in the ear of the listener, rather than the mouth of the speaker. It is simply that the rhythm and pronunciation of speech has changed."

== Causes ==
Foreign accent syndrome is more commonly pronounced in females than in males. In a meta-analysis of 112 patients with FAS, 97% were adults, and 67% were female. The typical age range for this disease is around 25–49 years of age. Only in 12.5% of the cases did the patients have previous exposure to the accent that they later seemed to develop due to FAS.

The majority of FAS patients develop FAS due to a stroke, but it can also develop as a result of developmental or psychological disorders, trauma, or tumors. Of the patients with neurological damage, the majority had a lesion in the supratentorial left hemisphere. Lesions primarily affected the: premotor cortex, motor cortex, basal ganglia or Broca's area. Lesions are also seen in the cerebellum, which projects to the previous areas. Right hemisphere damage rarely causes FAS. The majority of patients with FAS usually present other speech disorders, such as: mutism, aphasia, dysarthria, agrammatism and apraxia of speech.

== Diagnosis ==
Neurolinguist Harry Whitaker first coined the term foreign accent syndrome in 1982. He originally proposed some criteria that must be present in order to diagnose someone with FAS; they must be monolingual, they must have damage to their central nervous system that affects their speech, and their speech must be perceived as subjectively sounding foreign by themselves or clinicians. One problem with Whitaker's criteria is that they are based primarily on subjectivity, and therefore acoustic phonetic measurements are rarely used to diagnose FAS.

Since this syndrome is very rare, it takes a multidisciplinary team to evaluate the syndrome and diagnose it, including: speech-language pathologists, neurolinguists, neurologists, neuropsychologists and psychologists. In 2010, linguist Jo Verhoeven and neurolinguist Peter Mariën identified several subtypes of foreign accent syndrome. They described a neurogenic, developmental, psychogenic and mixed variant. Neurogenic FAS is the term used when FAS occurs after central nervous system damage. Developmental FAS is used when the accent is perceptible as of an early age, e.g. children who have always spoken with an accent. Psychogenic FAS is used when FAS is psychologically induced, associated with psychiatric disorder or clear psychiatric traits. The term mixed FAS is used when patients develop the disorder after neurological damage, but the accent change has such a profound impact on the self-perception and identity that they will modify or enhance the accent to make it fit with the new persona.

Diagnostic tests may include a detailed physical examination with focus on the facial muscles, medical history to rule out genetic conditions, CT scans, MRI scans, PET scans, single-photon emission computer tomography scans (SPECT), and speech and language tests with audio and video recordings. Psychological evaluations may be performed in order to rule out any psychiatric condition that may be causing the change in speech, as well as tests to assess reading, writing, and language comprehension in order to identify comorbid disorders. The differentiation of subtype is necessary for the clinician to allow for correct therapeutic guidance.

One of the symptoms of this syndrome is that the patient moves their tongue or jaw differently while speaking, which creates a different sound, so a recording of the speech pattern is done in order to analyze it. Often, images of the brain are taken with MRI, CT, SPECT or PET scans. This is done to see if there is structural and or functional damage in the areas of the brain that control speech and/or rhythm and melody of speech. Electroencephalography is sometimes performed to investigate whether there are disturbances at the electrophysiological level.

Treatment involves intense speech therapy. Methods such as oromotor exercises, using mirrors, targeting phonetic awareness, reading lists and texts, and using electropalatography are all methods that have been used in the past. Treatment should be developed on a patient by patient basis. About a quarter of FAS patients go through remission after treatment.

== Potential treatments ==
FAS is a very rare disorder. Likewise, there are not very many proposed treatments. Two that may provide relief to patients with FAS in the future include mastery of musical skills and "tongue reading".

In terms of mastery of music skills, research by Christiner and Reiterer suggests that musicians, both instrumental and vocal, are better at imitating foreign accents than non-musicians. Vocalists are further better than instrumentalists at this task. In this way, individuals with FAS might be able to reimitate their original, lost native accents more easily if they master a musical – especially vocal – skill.

Pursuing this further, another set of researchers, Banks et al. investigated the role of hearing a foreign accent versus hearing and seeing someone use a foreign accent and which of these may be better for helping an individual replicate a foreign accent. Contrary to the researcher's predictions, "no differences were found in perceptual gains between the two modalities." By contrast, a method that did seem to improve learning of non-native speech sounds was "real-time visual feedback of tongue movements with an interactive 3D visualization system based on electromagnetic articulography."

== History ==
The condition was first described in 1907 by the French neurologist Pierre Marie, and another early case was reported in a Czechoslovak study in 1919, conducted by German internist Alois Pick (1859–1945). Other well-known cases of the syndrome include one that occurred in Norway in 1941 after a young woman, Astrid L., suffered a head injury from shrapnel during an air-raid. After apparently recovering from the injury, she was left with what sounded like a strong German accent and was shunned by her fellow Norwegians.

== Society and culture ==
Cases of foreign accent syndrome often receive significant media coverage, and cases have been reported in the popular media as resulting from various causes including stroke, allergic reaction, physical injury, and migraine. A woman with foreign accent syndrome was featured on both Inside Edition and Discovery Health Channel's Mystery ER in October 2008, and in September 2013 the BBC published an hour-long documentary about Sarah Colwill, a woman from Devon, whose "Chinese" foreign accent syndrome resulted from a severe migraine.

In 2016, a Texas woman, Lisa Alamia, was diagnosed with foreign accent syndrome when, following a jaw surgery, she developed what sounded like a British accent. Ellen Spencer, a woman from Indiana who has foreign accent syndrome, was interviewed on the American public radio show Snap Judgment. The British singer George Michael reported briefly speaking in a West Country accent following his recovery from a three-week long coma in 2012.

== Cases ==
Table #1: Cases from developmental FAS (DFAS), Psychogenic FAS (PFAS) and a New Variant of Neurologic FAS

Subtype	Case Descriptions
DFAS	An adolescent male without family history of developmental disorders or personal psychiatric issues. No cognitive issue except for some executive function issues. Through a functional neuroimaging study, researchers found significantly decreased blood flow to the "medial prefrontal and lateral temporal regions bilaterally." They also found hypoperfusion in the cerebellum.
DFAS	Two males with mild DFAS had psychiatric disorders, which suggested a potential psychogenic diagnosis. But upon further examination, they were determined to have structural issue in their brains – "venous malformation and expanded perivascular spaces".
PFAS	Patient with head trauma received the diagnosis of PFAS. The reason for the given diagnosis instead of one of the others was due to lack of structural brain damage and the existence of neuropsychiatric disorders.
New Variant	Three adult males dealing with Broca's aphasia lose their regional accents. Studies on these patients imply that lesion of the "middle part of the left motor cortex and adjoining regions" may contribute to loss of regional accent.

== Media ==
Depictions of foreign accent syndrome in media have included Foreign Tongue, a 2019 stage musical by Cynthia Ashperger, and Foreign Tongue, a 2026 film adaptation by Boris Mojsovski.

== See also ==
- Susac's syndrome
- Xenoglossia
