= Ljubomir Kerekeš =

Croatian actor (born 1960)

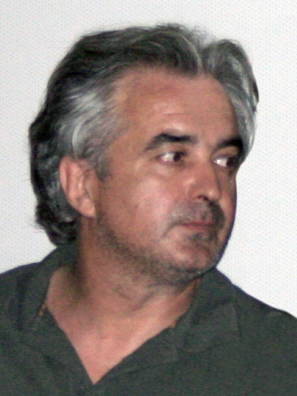
- Kerekeš in 2008
- Born: 16 January 1960 (age 66); Varaždin, PR Croatia, Yugoslavia
- Occupation: Actor
- Years active: 1980–present
- Spouse: Jasenka Kerekeš
- Children: 2

Ljubomir Kerekeš (born 16 January 1960) is a Croatian film, theatre and television actor.

== Life and work ==
Kerekeš began acting in 1980 in his hometown of Varaždin and between 1982 and 1996, was a member of the theatre ensemble at the Croatian National Theatre in Varaždin. In 1996 he moved to the Kerempuh theatre in Zagreb and in 1998 moved again to the Croatian National Theatre in Zagreb, where he has been working until 2014. In 2014, he returned to the National Theatre in Varaždin.

Apart from theatre, Kerekeš also appeared in a number of Croatian TV series and feature films, and is best known in the country for his role of major Aleksa in the hugely popular 1996 black comedy film How the War Started on My Island. He also appeared alongside Richard Gere in the 2007 American action-thriller The Hunting Party.

== Personal life ==
Kerekeš's wife is named Jasenka, and she works in the Varaždin National Theatre. They have a daughter, Ema, and a son, Jan who is also an actor.

== Selected filmography ==
Film
Year	Title	Role	Original name
1996	How the War Started on My Island	Major Aleksa Milosavljević	Kako je počeo rat na mom otoku
1998	The Three Men of Melita Žganjer	Zec	Tri muškarca Melite Žganjer
1999	Madonna	Kuzma Glavan	Bogorodica
2001	The Last Will	Honza	Posljednja volja
2001	The Miroslav Holding Co.	Petretić	Holding
2002	God Forbid a Worse Thing Should Happen	Feliks	Ne dao Bog većeg zla
2003	Witnesses	Dr. Matić	Svjedoci
2005	Sleep Sweet, My Darling	Darko Škrinjar	Snivaj, zlato moje
2006	Libertas	Veljko	Libertas
2007	The Hunting Party	Dragoslav "The Fox" Bogdanović	The Hunting Party
2008	Will Not End Here	Doctor	Nije kraj
2008	Where the Penguins Fly	dr. Alan Fjord	Gdje pingvini lete
2009	The Man Under the Table	Ćafur	Čovjek ispod stola
2010-2011	Najbolje godine	Ante "Lale" Lalić	Najbolje godine
2012	Cannibal Vegetarian	prof.dr. Matić	Ljudožder vegetarijanac
2012	Hives	Alojz	Košnice
2012	Inspector Martin and the Gang of Snails	Inspector Golatch	Inspektor Martin i banda puževa

=== Voice-over roles ===
Film
Dubbing year	Title	Role
2003	Finding Nemo	Bloat
2004	Aladdin	Genie
2004	The Return of Jafar	Genie
2004	Aladdin and the King of Thieves	Genie
2006	Ice Age: The Meltdown	Manny
2006	Over the Hedge	Verne
2006	Hoodwinked!	Nicky Flippers
