= Madonna (1999 film) =

- Croatian: Bogorodica
- Directed by: Neven Hitrec
- Based on: Hrvatska bogorodica by Hrvoje Hitrec
- Starring: Ljubomir Kerekeš; Lucija Šerbedžija; Ivo Gregurević
- Music by: Darko Hajsek
- Release date: 1999
- Running time: 85 minute
- Country: Croatia
- Language: Croatian

Madonna (Croatian: Bogorodica) is a 1999 Croatian film directed by Neven Hitrec and starring Ljubomir Kerekeš, Lucija Šerbedžija and Ivo Gregurević. It is based on a novel by Hrvoje Hitrec.

== Reception ==
At the 1999 Pula Film Festival, Madonna received the Big Golden Arena for Best Film, and Kerekeš and Šerbedžija won Golden Arenas for Best Actor and Best Actress. The critics wrote favorably of the film's directing, editing and acting, but criticized the scenario for being ideologized.
