= The Border Post =

- Directed by: Rajko Grlić
- Written by: Rajko Grlić; Ante Tomić
- Based on: Ništa nas ne smije iznenaditi by Ante Tomić
- Produced by: Ademir Kenović
- Starring: Toni Gojanović; Sergej Trifunović; Emir Hadžihafizbegović
- Cinematography: Slobodan Trninić
- Edited by: Andrija Zafranović
- Release date: 20 March 2006
- Running time: 94 minutes
- Countries: Croatia; Macedonia; Slovenia; Serbia and Montenegro; Bosnia and Herzegovina
- Language: Serbo-Croatian

The Border Post (Serbo-Croatian: Karaula / Караула) is a 2006 comedy-drama produced in international cooperation between the countries of former Yugoslavia and directed by Rajko Grlić. It is based on Ante Tomić's novel Ništa nas ne smije iznenaditi.

== Plot ==
A Yugoslav People's Army military border post on the Yugoslav-Albanian border in the late 1980s is thrown into disarray when its commander Safet Pašić discovers he has syphilis which he contracted from a local prostitute. To conceal his infidelity from his wife, he raises the combat readiness with a fabricated story about an imminent Albanian attack to buy time until he can complete the three-week course of penicillin.

Although the leave is cancelled for all personnel, Pašić secretly sends his doctor Siniša to transport his things from his home to the barracks. There, Siniša meets Pašić's wife Mirjana who is tired of her husband's military career. After several meetings they start a passionate affair.

Meanwhile, soldiers in the barracks reinforce their positions and try to spend their time. One of the soldiers, Ljuba Paunović, pulls various pranks to be discharged from the army which causes frequent conflicts with Pašić. In honor of deceased President Josip Broz Tito, (inspired by television coverage of the Relay of Youth), Paunović volunteers to march hundreds of kilometers from the barracks to Tito's grave at the House of Flowers in Belgrade. He is then sent to the high command but once there, he says he never actually wanted to march, and that Lt. Pašić had forced him. The high command decides to punish Pašić and sends a group of soldiers to arrest him. On their way, Mirjana joins them to find out what is really happening with her husband.

The sentries at the border post see the approaching military vehicles which they mistake for the Albanian troops and open fire. The shots hit and mortally wound Mirjana, while Paunović and Pašić start a fight which leaves Pašić dead.

The film ends with Siniša returning home, visibly shaken.

== Cast ==
- Sergej Trifunović as Ljuba Paunović
- Toni Gojanović as Siniša Sirisčević
- Emir Hadžihafizbegović as Lt. Safet Pašić
- Verica Nedeska as Mirjana (Pašić's wife)
- Bogdan Diklić as Col. Rade Orhideja
- Miodrag Fišeković as Gvozdenović
- Franjo Dijak as Budiščak
- Petar Arsovski as Ilievski
- Tadej Troha as Lanisnik
- Zoran Ljutkov as Milčo
- Igor Benčina as Vladika
- Selim Sendžul as Mica
- Elmedin Leleta as Hasan
- Hrvoje Kečkeš as Miljenko
- Halid Bešlić as Singer

== Background and production ==
After the dissolution of Yugoslavia, The Border Post was the first film made in co-production with all the former republics, as well as a company from Hungary, the United Kingdom, and Austria. The film was supported by the Ministry of Culture and Sports of Bosnia and Herzegovina, the Ministry of Culture of Croatia, the Ministry of Culture of Macedonia, the Ministry of Culture of the Republic of Serbia, the Film Fund from Slovenia, Macedonian Radio Television, Croatian Radiotelevision, and the Federal Television of Bosnia and Herzegovina.

The screenplay, written by Rajko Grlić and Ante Tomić, is based on Ništa nas ne smije iznenaditi, Tomić's 2003 novel, with some minor changes. From the early 1980s, the plot was moved to 1987, the advanced stage of Serb-Albanian conflict and the beginning of Slobodan Milošević's era. Second lieutenant Pašić's character, originally an ethnic Hungarian, was changed to Bosniak in order to accommodate for Emir Hadžihafizbegović.

The film was shot at authentic locations in Bitola and the Galičica National Park above Lake Ohrid. The filming lasted from 10 May 2005 to 6 July 2005.

== Premiere ==
The premiere in Skopje was held on 20 March 2006. The premiere in Belgrade took place on 22 March at the Sava Center and was attended by 4,000 people. Following the Belgrade premiere, there was a premiere in Sarajevo at the Zetra Hall, in Zagreb on 28 March, and in Ljubljana on 30 March.

In Croatia, the film was watched by 20,000 people within ten days of its release.

== Awards ==
At the Pula Film Festival in 2006, Emir Hadžihafizbegović received the Golden Arena for Best Actor. At the Trieste Film Festival in 2007, the film received the Audience Award. Director Rajko Grlić was nominated for the Golden Shell Award at the San Sebastian International Film Festival. At the Festroia International Film Festival, the director received four awards: two Golden Dolphins, one Silver Dolphin, and the FIPRESCI Award.

== Rating and critique ==
On the review aggregator website Rotten Tomatoes, 83% of 6 critics' reviews are positive.

Journalist Nenad Polimac from the Zagreb-based Globus stated that Karaula is "the pinnacle of Rajko Grlić's career."
