= Ognjen Sviličić =

Croatian screenwriter and film director

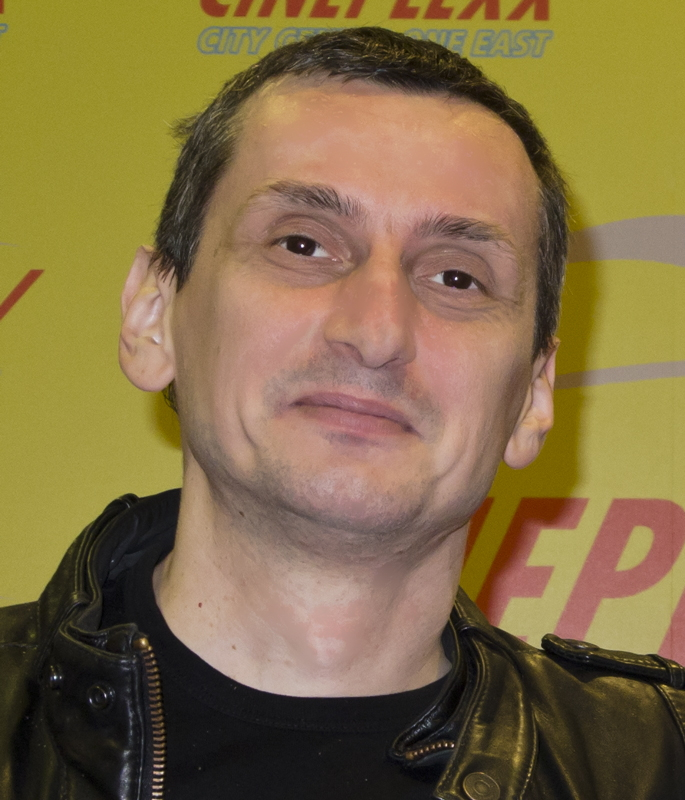
- Born: 1971 (age 54–55); Split, Yugoslavia
- Years active: 1999–present
- Awards: “I Wish I Where a Shark” 2000, 70 min, Croatia Premiere: Mannheim 2000 “Sorry for Kung fu” 2003 75 min, Croatia Premiere: Berlinale, Forum of new cinema 2004 Grand Prix Warsaw film festival 2004 “Armin” 2007, 84 min, Croatia, Germany, Bosnia and Herzegovina Premiere: Berlinale, Forum of new cinema 2007 FIPRESCI prize, best foreign film Palms Springs 2008 East of the west award, Karlovy Vary 2008 “Two Sunny Days” 2010, 78 min, Croatia Premiere: Warsaw 2011 “These are the Rules” 2014, 78 min Croatia, France, Serbia, North Macedonia Premiere: Venice, Orizzonti, 2014 Best Actor Venice Orizzonti, 2014 Best director Warsaw 2015 Best director Les Arcs 2015 “The Voice” 2019, 80 min Croatia, Serbia, North Macedonia Premiere. Busan 2019

Ognjen Sviličić (born 1971 in Split) is a screenwriter and film director, based in Berlin, noted for his critically acclaimed 2007 films Sorry For Kung Fu, Armin and These Are the Rules.

== Career ==
Sviličić was born 1971 in Split, in a family of journalists. He started his career with a series of TV features which had a mixed critical response. At the beginning of the 2000s, Sviličić often worked as a co-writer or script doctor on films by other directors (What Iva Recorded by Tomislav Radić, The Melon Route by Branko Schmidt). Many of the directors with whom he worked made significantly better films than usual while co-working with Sviličić. Sviličić was therefore sometimes nicknamed "Mabuse of Croatian cinema", who "resurrects [directors] from the dead".

Sviličić's first international success was the comedy Sorry for Kung Fu, in which a young woman from the Dalmatian highlands comes back from Germany to her native village. Girl (Daria Lorenci) is pregnant, but does not reveal the identity of the father. Their old-fashioned parents try to find a husband for her, but she stubbornly refuses. The film was screened in a Forum program of Berlinale.

Sviličić's next film, Armin, was also screened in Berlin Forum. That is the story about a teenage musician and his simpleton father who travel from Bosnia to Zagreb to audition for a German coproduction film. Son is skeptical and bitter, and father is naive and overtly enthusiastic for anything that is "Western" and "European".

His next internationally recognised film was These Are the Rules, premiered in the Orrizonti section at the Venice Film Festival, where it won the award for the best actor.

Sviličić is continually working as a script writer, he wrote the script for "The Father" together with director Srdan Golubović (Premiere Berlinale 2020, Panorama audience award).

He was working as a script consultant for many European script development platforms like First Film First, EAVE or Nipkow Program. At the Academy of Dramatic Art in Zagreb, he has worked as a screenwriting tutor, later he started teaching at a smaller art academy in Široki Brijeg in Bosnia Herzegovina.

Sviličić signed the Declaration on the Common Language of the Croats, Serbs, Bosniaks and Montenegrins.

== Filmography ==
- Wish I Were a Shark (Da mi je biti morski pas) (1999) — writer and director
- Sorry for Kung Fu (Oprosti za kung fu) (2004) — writer and director
- What Iva Recorded (Što je Iva snimila 21. listopada 2003.) (2005) — writer
- The Melon Route (Put lubenica) (2006) — writer
- Armin (2007) — writer and director
- Metastases (2009) — writer
- Two Sunny Days (2010) — writer and director
- These Are the Rules (2014) — writer and director
- We Will Be the World Champions (2015) — writer
- The Voice (2019) — writer and director
- Father (2020) — writer
