= I Want You (1998 film) =

- Directed by: Michael Winterbottom
- Written by: Eoin McNamee
- Produced by: Andrew Eaton
- Starring: Rachel Weisz; Alessandro Nivola; Labina Mitevska; Luka Petrušić
- Cinematography: Sławomir Idziak
- Edited by: Trevor Waite
- Music by: Adrian Johnston
- Production companies: PolyGram Filmed Entertainment; Revolution Films
- Distributed by: PolyGram Filmed Entertainment
- Release date: 18 February 1998
- Running time: 87 minutes
- Country: United Kingdom
- Language: English

I Want You is a 1998 English crime film directed by Michael Winterbottom and written by Eoin McNamee. It stars Rachel Weisz, Alessandro Nivola, Labina Mitevska, and Luka Petrušić. The film centers on the obsessive infatuation two men have with the same mysterious woman. The film premiered at the 1998 Berlin International Film Festival, where it won a Special Mention Honor for cinematographer Sławomir Idziak.

The film's title was inspired by the Elvis Costello song of the same name.

== Plot ==
At Farhaven, a British seaside town, a 14-year-old boy named Honda bumps into Helen, a hairdresser. During that short encounter, he notices that Helen inadvertently dropped her bracelet. Ever since accidentally witnessing the dead body of his mother, who committed suicide in her bathtub, Honda does not speak a word to anyone. However, a now infatuated Honda tracks Helen down and silently gives her back the bracelet. As a result, she starts to act friendly towards him.

Meanwhile, after eight years in prison, Helen's ex-boyfriend Martin returns to town. He still pines for Helen, but is scared to approach her. Frustrated, he pays to spend time with a sex worker that has some of her same features.

Both Honda and Martin are shocked to discover that Helen has a boyfriend, a radio DJ named Bob. Stalking the couple with a long-range microphone, Honda discovers that, despite having dated Bob for six months, Helen refuses to have sex with him. Frustrated, Bob is starting to act aggressively towards her. Thanks to Honda and his older sister, Bob is tricked into playing a tape of his violent behavior towards Helen on his own radio show. Believing all of this was the work of Helen, an enraged Bob later shouts at her on the phone, and the two break up. While driving by the beach, Bob spots Honda, figures out what is going on and chases after him. Martin, who had been stalking Bob, takes this opportunity to beat him up. Honda's sister, believing he was protecting her little brother, becomes attracted to Martin. The two start dating, but he only seems to have eyes for Helen.

One night, Helen decides to go to a nightclub. There, she bumps into Sam, an old friend, and starts dancing with him. The two hit it off and, leaving the building, they start kissing. However, Helen again refuses to have sex, and the situation turns violent. She is about to get raped when Martin intervenes and attacks Sam. Scared by Martin, a distraught Helen runs away. She finds Honda, who was also stalking Helen, and he comforts her. Helen later reveals that, when she was 14, an already adult Martin started a sexual relationship with her. Helen is still dealing with the trauma from his abuse.

Martin later appears at her house, and after some talking, the two have sex. Helen is left disturbed by that encounter. Meanwhile, Honda continues to spy on her. While doing some research, he discovers that Martin ended up in jail for charges of manslaughter. According to Helen, the victim was her father, who died in the struggle that ensued after he found her in bed with Martin. Helen later asks for a restraining order on Martin. Fearing he will return to jail, Martin decides to leave town, but first, he wants to visit Helen one last time.

That night, Helen invites Honda to her house and creates situations in which he has to take most of his clothes off. She starts touching him inappropriately when Martin knocks on the door. Knowing who it is, Helen orders Honda to remain on one side of the house while she speaks to Martin on the other. At the entrance, Martin and Helen agree to have sex one last time before he leaves forever. While doing it, Martin starts strangling her. Hearing the struggle through his microphone, Honda saves Helen by smashing a bottle on Martin's head. Hurt, Martin reveals that it was Helen who killed her father. Before Martin can say anything else, Helen grabs a bust and beats him to death. She then convinces Honda to help her throw the body into the river, the same thing she and Martin did with her father's corpse. Then, a blood-splattered Helen approaches Honda, who runs away, traumatized. Helen leaves the town, and Honda resumes his life. His later recordings imply that he eventually started to speak again.

== Cast ==
- Rachel Weisz as Helen
- Alessandro Nivola as Martin
- Luka Petrušić as Honda
- Labina Mitevska as Smokey
- Ben Daniels as Bob
- Carmen Ejogo as Amber

== Critical reception ==
In The A.V. Club, Keith Phipps gave a positive review in which he wrote, "Like the Elvis Costello song from which it takes its title, I Want You explores the place where passion becomes madness, a troubling area of the psyche inaccessible to similarly inclined films (like Romance) that loudly announce their intentions. Winterbottom's movie is made all the more effective for the way it seems to inadvertently stumble across life's dark places, an element enhanced by its structure."

TV Guide wrote, "This fairly straightforward thriller is tricked up with the Conversation-like gimmick of Honda's aural peeping, but it's Slawomir Idziak's handsome cinematography, which makes much of the story look as though it was shot through neon- and rain-streaked glass, and the captivating score…that make it genuinely haunting."

== Awards and nominations ==
Berlin Film Festival

- 1998: Won, Special Mention - Sławomir Idziak
- 1998: Nominated, Golden Berlin Bear Award - Michael Winterbottom

Camerimage

- 1998: Nominated, Golden Frog Award - Slawomir Idziak

Valladolid International Film Festival

- 1998: Won, Youth Jury Award - Michael Winterbottom
