= These Are the Rules =

- Takva su pravila
- Directed by: Ognjen Sviličić
- Written by: Ognjen Sviličić
- Starring: Emir Hadžihafizbegović; Jasna Žalica; Hrvoje Vladisavljević
- Cinematography: Crystel Fournier
- Edited by: Atanas Georgiev
- Production companies: Maxima film KinoElektron; Biberche Production; Trice Films
- Release dates: August 29, 2014 (Venice Film Festival); January 29, 2015 (Croatia)
- Running time: 77 minutes
- Language: Croatian
- Budget: HRK 8.2 million (c. €1.1 million)

These Are the Rules (Croatian: Takva su pravila) is a Croatian 2014 drama film written and directed by Ognjen Sviličić.

== Plot ==
Maja (Jasna Žalica), Ivo (Emir Hadžihafizbegović) and their 18-year-old son Tomica (Hrvoje Vladisavljević) are an ordinary family from Zagreb. Maja and Ivo are nearing retirement and are struggling financially while Tomica is unemployed after graduating from high school.

One day, for no apparent reason, Tomica is attacked and beaten by a group of kids in the street. The next day, he suffers from a strong headache. His parents take him to hospital, but the doctors find only minor injuries. Soon after, Tomica collapses and slides into a coma, and it becomes clear that his condition is life-threatening. Maja and Ivo are suddenly thrown into a challenging situation, in which they decide to fight against the apathetic system.

== Cast ==
- Emir Hadžihafizbegović — Ivo
- Jasna Žalica — Maja
- Hrvoje Vladisavljević — Tomica
- Goran Bogdan — Doctor Raus
- Ljubomir Bandović — Ljubo
- Mira Banjac — Old Lady
- Stjepan Perić — Policeman

== Production and themes ==
The film's screenplay is inspired by a real-life 2008 incident in which Luka Ritz, an 18-year-old high school graduate, died of injuries sustained in a seemingly senseless attack by a group of teens. His case received high-profile media coverage in Croatia and led to the establishment of the national Luka Ritz Award for the promotion of tolerance and non-violence in schools. In the words of Ognjen Sviličić:

This event made me think about his parents, and how they dealt with this tragedy. I imagined ordinary people, who had always obeyed the laws and the rules. But now, when they are faced with this horrible tragedy, no one wants to help them, and they are unable to do anything about it. No one listens to them, no one cares, they are simply not important. These people represent the majority that suffers quietly, and also carries on through the injustices done to them. My story is dedicated to these people.

== Release ==
The film's world premiere took place on 29 August 2014, in the Horizons section of the 71st Venice International Film Festival. It was the first Croatian film shown at the Venice Film Festival since Zrinko Ogresta's Red Dust in 1999.

== Accolades ==
The film won the Jury Grand Prix at 2014's Les Arcs International Film Festival. Ognjen Sviličić won the Best Director award at the Warsaw Film Festival in Poland. Emir Hadžihafizbegović won the Venice Horizons Award for Best Actor or Actress at the 71st Venice International Film Festival in Italy and had also won the Golden Arena for Best Actor at the Pula Film Festival in Croatia.
