= Darko Hajsek =

Croatian composer (born 1959)

- Birth name: Darko Hajsek
- Born: 22 September 1959 (age 65); Zagreb, PR Croatia, FPR Yugoslavia
- Genres: Classical music, Soundtrack, Opera, Symphony, Orchestration
- Occupation: Composer
- Instrument(s): Piano, keyboard, organ, Hammond organ, guitar
- Years active: 1974–present
- Website: darkohajsek.webs.com

Darko Hajsek (born 22 September 1959) is a Croatian composer. He composed (and by itself orchestrated) a respectable opus of more than 650 musical works, concert and musical-stage forms, ranging from small, instrumental and chamber shape to big orchestral symphonic works and ten large music and music-theatrical works of contemporary forms and synthesis involving opera, musical theatre and ballet, stage music and other musical forms.

His music has been performed in productions of companies such as Croatian National Theatre in Zagreb, NT Varaždin, Croatian National Theatre in Split, Croatian National Theatre in Osijek, Gavella Drama Theatre, Zagreb Youth Theatre, Zagreb Theatre Komedija, City Theater Žar Ptica, Satirical Theatre Kerempuh Zagreb, Cankarjev Dom-Ljubljana, Maribor Slovene National Theatre, then Croatian Radiotelevision, Orpheus, Suzy, Zagreb Film, Maxima-movie, Inter-movie, Positive film, with numerous performances in Croatia and in a number of European and non-European countries.

== Early life ==
Since the beginning of his involvement with music of classical foundation Hajsek showed tendencies towards a broader spectrum of musical expressions and has developed the ability to express a full range of musical styles that are used in his creative work, sometimes as musical lexicon in pure form and sometimes as elements of peculiar authorial synthesis and recognizable composer's "touch". His interest in music, musical talent and composer's impulse he has expressed at an early age, starting to intensively compose in the seventies, at 15 years of age writing his first elements of symphony. He began composing in adolescence, from the beginning of his career in 1989, working exclusively as a composer, with 27 years of professional compositional work behind his name.

== Career ==
=== Early career ===
Since the middle of the 70's Hajsek began developing his composing style, which included elements of classical, electrophonic and 'avant-garde' music, antic musical tradition with elements of jazz and archaic music. In the 80's he turns more towards orchestral music and finds inspiration in the works of great composers of the 20th century such as Stravinsky, Prokofiev, Shostakovich, Alberto Ginastera and Aaron Copland, but also in the avant-garde and electronic music of Karlheinz Stockhausen, Pierre Schaeffer, Edgard Varèse, La Monte Young, Terry Riley and John Chowning, Krzysztof Penderecki, György Ligeti and John Cage and composing works on the basis of such inspiration, while on the other hand being inspired by alternative rock and progressive music (Keith Emerson) and the works of New York music and art scene, with artists like John Cale, Andy Warhol and Brian Eno, and authors like Tom Waits and Nick Cave.

=== 1980s ===
Hajsek studied classical composition, polyphony, harmony and counterpoint at the Academy of Music, University of Zagreb, specializing on seminars of contemporary and electrophonic music. From that time dates the author's collaboration with big American avant-garde composer Alvin Lucier, with following compositions standing out in particular: "Sounds from Lost in Space" for chamber orchestra and electronics and "2 Loud Sounds 4 4 Steel Strings" for double string orchestra, "Passacaglia" for big orchestra, "Alpine Symphony" and the ballet "Mishima".

=== 1990s ===
In the 90's Hajsek worked intensively on new musical works and develops his own composing and performing techniques, while experimenting with new forms, which resulted in a particularly interesting work "The sound of the earth" for chamber orchestra, electronics and instruments, created as works of art by the most famous visual artists which has caused great interest and positive reactions in Croatia and abroad, presented by leading Swiss magazine for culture, one of the most influential in the world.

=== Modern rock ===
Hajsek composed, arranged and played for many famous Croatian and Bosnian rock bands and their members (Bijelo Dugme, Divlje Jagode, Drugi način, Vještice, Peti Element). He also collaborated with many renowned jazz musicians (Csaba Deseo, Domagoj Ralašić, Miro Kadoić). One of his projects in early 2000s was Van Hajsek Orchestra, a group whose music is based on combination of elements of classical, ethno, popular, commercial and rock music, thus having nothing in common with the usual gig production and performance.

=== Film scoring and media production ===
Hajsek composed high number of works related to media and multimedia production and worked on theater and film projects. In that period came two interesting cantatas for choir and orchestra "Mother", "Next to the river of Babylon" and "Wave" for eight voice choir, "Antistema ghithago" electrophonic music, 2nd Symphony, and the music for great animated series "The Pomkiners" which has undergone numerous broadcast around the world (Canada, United States, UK, Australia, Sweden, Norway, Switzerland etc.) valued also because of the author's music. The beginning of the third millennium has been characterized in the author's work by large number of new compositions and more interest towards music theater works and film music, working on a variety of film projects, with four long length movies "Madonna", "Sleep Sweet, My Darling", "The Man Under the Table" and "Walt Disney's Mousetrap" standing out, just as dozens of short films and documentaries and art films of animation in which he collaborated with great artists within the field, such as Milan Blažeković, winner of the Academy Award for Best Animated Short Film, Zlatko Bourek and many other renowned artists. The Vijenac, Croatian magazine for literature, art and science, at the time of Hajsek's film work, praises Hajsek's composing abilities and, regarding Hajsek's masterwork on the Madonna soundtrack, puts authentic Croatian soundtrack business industry in high perspective for the future. He composed music for number of art movies, like "Theory of Reflection", "Malformance-Performance", "Leaf on Water", "On the Gallery" and others. Musical works of particular interest from this period, amongst others, were "Sonata for piano and percussion", "Allegro Spicatto" for chamber orchestra, "Fuga Primavera" and "Fuga Polaris" for big orchestra, "Symphony of Istria", "Opera Furiosa", string quintet "In the evening" and "Mare Stellarum" electrophonic composition.

=== Relationship to theatre and film ===
Hajsek's professional composing career has always been related to theater and he wrote a large number of musical and theater related works in the forms of modern synthesis of opera, theater and musicals, field within he cooperated with American Broadway musical-director Seth Weinstein. They successfully collaborated on the theater project Black House (Croatian: Crna Kuća), an original Croatian musical composed and authored by Hajsek. The musical had a great reception and was called a "successful blend of home-made satire with a fresh breath of Broadway".

The main difference in terms of traditional film and theater music and composer's concept is that the composer's works in the field of theater and film are complete musical forms, so in fact representing concert works intended for independent concert performance. One of the major projects in Hajsek's relationship to theatre is The Asphalt Rose, which premiered in 2007. The project, based on book by Igor Weidlich, was, at the time of its opening, the first original Croatian musical in more than a decade to be performed at the Zagreb Theatre Komedija. Commenting the after-premiere of the musical Hajsek explains that the work connects "a postmodernist piece that has music with baroque, Viennese classics and romanticism, through twentieth-century styles, to the influence of music from different parts of the world, such as Cuba and Africa." Hajsek's music structure is formed by variations in classical, ethno and modern music.

Hajsek founded and led a full range of ensembles in classical music and various forms of contemporary music which involved a large number of prominent musicians and artists from Croatia and abroad, working also as a pianist performing his music and the music of other authors, with whom he has so far performed in places like Croatian Music Institute, Vatroslav Lisinski Concert Hall, Mimara, Arena in Pula and other secular/profane and sacred concert spaces locally and abroad. He also works as a music recording producer and musical director, primarily for his own music. For his composing work, the author has received numerous awards, amongst which the most important are two music awards Porin, that he achieved as the best composer for the soundtrack CD and for the best composition in the category of music for theater, film and TV projects and also the Golden Arena for Best Film Music for the best film music, "Golden Firebird" (in a competition between composers from 10 European countries and Israel) at the International Theatre Festival in Zagreb and other awards.

=== Selection of works ===
From approximately 1974:

- Fuga on Mozart's theme for strings
- Hommage a Debussy for piano
- Tocatta for piano
- Midnight for 2 guitars and celeste
- "The Secret World" for wind orchestra
- "Astral Vibrations" - electrophonic music
- "Exhibition music" - electrophonic music
- La cogida y la muerte: for choir, string orchestra and percussion (1983)
- La sangre dermada: for choir, string orchestra and percussion (1984)
- String Trio (1985)
- "Passacaglia" for strings and orchestra (1987)
- "Sounds from Lost in Space" for chamber orchestra and electronics (1988)
- "2 Loud Sounds 4 4 Steel Strings" for double string orchestra- div. s 24 (1989)
- "Mishima" ballet (1989)
- "Alpine Symphony" (1990)
- "The sound of the earth" for chamber orchestra, electronics and artistically crafted instruments (1992)
- "Wave" for eight voice choir (1992)
- 2 Symphony (1993)
- "Mother" cantata for chorus and orchestra (1994)
- "Antistema githago" Electronical music (1999)
- "Night," song for voice, piano and orchestra (1999) "PORIN"
- "Pavane" - for Strings (2001)
- "The Mediterranean" - for flute and organ (2001)
- "Oceanus" - electrophonic music (2003)
- "Waltz villa" for choir and orchestra (2004)
- "On the eve" for Piano Quintet (2005)
- "Mare Stellarum" - electrophonic music (2006)
- "Dragon geometry" film Ballet (2007)
- "Allegro spiccatto" - for chamber orchestra (2009)
- "Fuga Polaris" - for big orchestra (2009)
- "Fuga primavera" - for big orchestra (2009)
- Sonata for piano and percussion (2010)
- "Love in 4 dimensions" film Ballet (2009)
- "The Ballad of Augustus" for choir and orchestra (2011)
- "Aria bellissima" for voice and orchestra (2012)
- Mazurka for Piano (2013)
- "Dancing with the joke" - for orchestra (2013)
- "Andante 2013 " for orchestra (2013)
- Impromtus for piano (2015)

Major musical theatre works, film and stage music (selection):

- "Brigades of Beauty" stage music (1988)
- "Mail" Rabindranath Tagore - stage music (1989)
- "Antigone" stage music (1997)
- "Golden Rose" stage music (1998)
- "Medea" stage music (1999)
- "Madonna (1999 film)" (1999) "PORIN"
- "Walt Disney's Mousetrap" (2003)
- "Midsummer Night's Dream" (2004) (musical)
- "Sleep Sweet, My Darling" - "Golden Arena" for the original music for film (2005)
- "Malformance - Performance" film art animation (2006)
- "Suddenly Last Summer" stage music (2008)
- "With all my heart" soundtrack (2007)
- "Ruža na asfaltu" (2007)
- "Drazen" soundtrack (2008)
- "Peter Pan" (musical) (2008)
- "Maria Stuart" stage music (2009)
- "Tango" (2009) (musical)
- "The Man Under the Table" soundtrack (2009)
- "Grižula" (2009) (opera-musical)
- "Pippi Longstocking" (2009) (musical)
- "Time out" soundtrack (2009)
- "Leaf on Water" musical art - film animation (2009)
- "On the Gallery" musical art - film animation (2009)
- "Class optimistic" soundtrack (2011)
- "Zulejka" musical art -film animation (2012)
- "Plitvice" musical documentary feature (2011)
- "Salome" (2010) (musical)
- "The underwater world of the Adriatic" musical documentary (2011)
- "You're lying Melita '(2011) (musical) "Golden Firebird"
- "Elektra" (2011) (musical)
- "Midsummer Night's Dream" (2012) (opera-musical)
- "Black House" - musical (2012)
- "Crime and Punishment" (2013) (opera-musical)
- "Tamara" "soundtrack (2013)
- "Wild horses" musical (2014)
- "Wolfdog" - (2014) (opera-musical)
- "Opera furiosa" for soloists, chorus and orchestra (2014)
- "Eco-eco" stage music (2014)
- "Fisherman’s Tale" soundtrack (2015)
- "Hromi ideali" - musical (2016)
