= Sven Lasta =

Croatian actor

- Born: 18 April 1925; Pakrac, Kingdom of Yugoslavia (present-day Croatia)
- Died: 15 August 1996 (aged 71); Zagreb, Croatia
- Occupation(s): Film and theatre actor
- Years active: 1964–1991

Sven Lasta (18 April 1925 – 15 August 1996) was a Croatian television and film actor.

== Filmography ==
Year	Title	Role	Notes
1965	The Key (Ključ)	Muz	(segment "Poslije Predstave")
1969	The Fifth Day of Peace	Fra-Pave	
1970	The Fifth Day of Peace	Bosch	
1971	Gold, Frankincense and Myrrh	Mali	
1971	Short Night of Glass Dolls	Pravski - Blind Man	
1974	Il tempo dell'inizio	David Lambda	
1985	Jenseits der Morgenröte	Fugger	Episode: "Adler der Steppe"
1985	The Red and the Black	Upravitelj	
1986	Nägel mit Köpfen		
1986	The Elm-Chanted Forest	Do, žaba and puž Muž	Voice
1989	Povratak Katarine Kozul		
1990	The Magician's Hat	Pero, Marta and puž Muž	Voice
1990	The Murmur of the Shell (Školjka šumi)	Magistar	
1991	The Time of Warriors (Vrijeme ratnika)	Ubojica u sumi	
