= Walt Disney's Mousetrap =

- Directed by: Eduard Tomičić
- Written by: Zoran Ferić
- Produced by: Mario Orešković
- Starring: Željko Vukmirica
- Cinematography: Branko Cahun
- Edited by: Kruno Kušec
- Music by: Darko Hajsek
- Release date: 1 January 2003
- Running time: 71 minutes
- Country: Croatia
- Language: Croatian

Walt Disney's Mousetrap (Croatian: Mišolovka Walta Disneya) is a Croatian fantasy-comedy film directed by Eduard Tomičić and is based on the writing by Zoran Ferić. It was released in 2003.

== Plot ==
Completely enchanted by Walt Disney and the heroes from his animation world, a nine-year-old boy awaits the visit of his uncle from the USA. Young boy's family is also anxious to finally see a man they haven't seen for so long. With the appearance of a gangster-movie hero, the boy's uncle is full of interesting stories adding even more flame to the child's imagination. Everything seems perfect and surreal as if almost they are completely sucked into a world of imagination, up until one horrific event reveals the real truth about uncle's life and deeds.

== Cast ==
- Željko Vukmirica
- Matej Čavlović
- Boris Festini
- Slavko Juraga
- Josip Marotti
- Jadranka Matković
- Marina Nemet
- Marinko Prga
- Predrag Vušović
