= Ma-Anne Dionisio =

Filipino-Canadian singer and actress

- Born: July 16, 1973 (age 53); Taguig, Manila, Philippines
- Occupations: Singer, actress
- Years active: 1992–present
- Children: 3

Ma-Anne Dionisio (born 16 July 1973) is a Filipino-Canadian singer and actress. She is the middle child of five sisters; her parents moved the family from Taguig, Metro Manila, Philippines, to Winnipeg, Manitoba, Canada in 1990.

== Early life ==
Ma-Anne began singing at the age of 13 and immediately began winning awards and critical acclaim in the Philippines. She was chosen as a finalist in the Philippine television talent search program Discovery '88, which led to guest appearances on television programs in the Philippines and the opportunity to record her first single, "Ang Puso Ko'y Sa Iyo", with Vicor Recording Company. She also appeared in the television drama series Discovery Drama Theatre.

After emigrating to Canada, she won a leading role in Experience Canada: The Spirit of a Nation Tour, a cross-country musical tour celebrating Canada's 125th anniversary. A TV presentation of the show was seen by someone in the casting department for the Toronto production of Miss Saigon who arranged for an audition for the role of Kim in the musical.

== Career ==
=== Stage ===
She won the role of Kim in the original Toronto production of Miss Saigon in 1993 at the Princess of Wales Theatre and was a celebrated success, earning a nomination for the Dora Mavor Moore Award for Best Actress in a Musical in 1994. Dionisio has since performed as Kim in British, Australian and American productions of Miss Saigon. She played the role of Éponine in the U.S. touring company of Les Misérables, joining Lea Salonga as the second Asian to play Éponine in western theater.

She played Bertrande de Rols in Martin Guerre in London, performed in West Side Story as Maria at the Stratford Festival in 1999, and appeared on Broadway as Little Girl in the 2002 revival of Flower Drum Song.

Her stage work also includes productions of Jesus Christ Superstar, Sunday in the Park with George, Mamma Mia!, Grease, and The Secret Garden on Broadway and London's West End.

In July 2008, Dionisio reprised her original role as Kim in the seated production of Miss Saigon at The Muny in St. Louis, Missouri. In July 2010, she also reprised this role in the second Toronto, Ontario, Canada production.

She is a founding artist of Theatre 20, a musical theatre company in Toronto formed by artists in 2009, and performed in Theatre 20's 2011 Concert Series at the Panasonic Theatre.

In 2011, she received a second Dora Mavor Moore Award nomination for Best Actress in a Musical.

In August 2011, she reprised the role of Kim in Miss Saigon at Broadway at Music Circus, closing the Wells Fargo Pavilion's 61st season in Sacramento, California, directed by Stafford Arima.

In 2013, she starred as Grizabella in a new all-Canadian production of Cats at the Panasonic Theatre in Toronto, the first resident Canadian production of Cats in the city since 1985.

In 2017, she appeared in The Secret Garden at Theatre Calgary, directed by Stafford Arima.

In 2019, she won the Dora Mavor Moore Award for Outstanding Performance in a Leading Role at the 40th Annual Dora Mavor Moore Awards, for her portrayal of Diana Goodman in the Toronto production of Next to Normal, produced by the Musical Stage Company and presented by David Mirvish.

In 2020, she appeared in the world premiere of Marjorie Chan's Lady Sunrise at Factory Theatre, directed by Nina Lee Aquino, as part of an ensemble of six Asian-Canadian women.

In May 2022, she appeared in the English-language world premiere of Lesson in Forgetting by Emma Haché, presented by Pleiades Theatre at the Young Centre for the Performing Arts in Toronto's Distillery District.

In July 2022, she starred as Elsie in Billy & the Dreamerz, a new original musical by Neil Coombs and Grace Kosaka, which had a showcase run at the Toronto Fringe Festival at Ada Slaight Hall, Daniels Spectrum.

In the summer of 2024, she appeared in the world premiere of Ma-Buhay, an original musical celebrating Filipino-Canadian history, at Rainbow Stage in Winnipeg, playing the roles of Gloria and Galinda.

In February 2026, she appeared as the Woman in the world premiere of The Tale of the Gifted Prince at Theatre Calgary, in partnership with Somerled Arts. The musical, with book and lyrics by Lezlie Wade and music by Daniel Green, is based on Lloyd Alexander's novel The Remarkable Journey of Prince Jen. The production featured an all-Asian cast from across Canada and the United States, directed and choreographed by Darren Lee, and ran from February 14 to March 15, 2026 at the Max Bell Theatre (Werklund Centre). Her character, the Woman, is a shapeshifting shaman who guides the titular prince through his journey — a role reimagined as female for the musical adaptation.

In April 2026, she performed in Divine Women 2: A Celebration of Iconic Female Performers at the Victoria Playhouse Petrolia, a theatrical concert featuring five Canadian female artists from musical theatre, Broadway and concert stages, running April 21 to May 1, 2026.

On May 30, 2026, she headlined Daan: A Journey Through Song, a one-night-only concert at the Royal Manitoba Theatre Centre in Winnipeg, alongside Stephanie Sy. The concert, whose title means "the road" in Tagalog, blended Broadway hits, works from the Filipino-Canadian musical theatre canon, and a preview of the upcoming musical Rizal, with book and music by Winnipeg composer Joseph Aragon.

In the summer of 2026, she appeared in two productions at the Confederation Centre of the Arts as part of the Charlottetown Festival: Anne of Green Gables – The Musical™, running June 25 to August 29, 2026 at the Sobey Family Theatre, and Come from Away, running June 30 to September 26, 2026.

She is involved in the development of Rizal, an upcoming original Canadian musical about the life of Philippine national hero José Rizal, with book and music by Winnipeg composer Joseph Aragon, which received a public preview as part of the Daan concert at the Royal Manitoba Theatre Centre in May 2026.

=== Film and television ===
Dionisio has appeared in numerous film and television productions. An early credit is the voice role of Ariana in the Canadian animated film Mirabelle and Me (Bardel Entertainment/Nelvana, 1994). Her screen credits include the role of Patricia in The Waiting Room (2015), Circulating Nurse in Remedy (Global, 2015), Jazzagal #2 in five episodes of Schitt's Creek (CBC, 2016–2017), Caroler 3 in the television film Christmas Next Door (2017), Mrs. Kim in Good Witch (2018), Mae Wilson in Behind Closed Doors (2020), Angela Garcia in Coroner (CBC, 2021), and Helen in four episodes of Astrid and Lilly Save the World (Syfy/Crave, 2022). She voiced the character Deedee Curazon in the video game Hardspace: Shipbreaker (2022) and played Jane DiMaapi in the Apple TV+ miniseries Five Days at Memorial (2022).

She also appeared in In Her Mother's Eyes (HERetic Films) and Flashpoint (CTV/CBS). More recent credits include the role of Dolores in the short film Inang Reyna (2024), Tita Carmelita in the television film Recipe for Romance (2025), Judge Malinda Chang in Boston Blue (CBS, 2025), and appearances in the series Abroad (2023–2025).

== Stage roles ==
Year	Production	Role	Venue / Company
1993–1995	Miss Saigon	Kim	Princess of Wales Theatre, Toronto (Canadian premiere)
1994	Mirabelle and Me	Ariana (voice)	Bardel Entertainment / Nelvana (animated film)
1996	Les Misérables	Éponine	Asian / 3rd U.S. Tour
1997	Miss Saigon	Kim	London West End
1997–1998	Martin Guerre	Bertrande de Rols	London West End
1999	West Side Story	Maria	Stratford Festival
2002	Flower Drum Song	Little Girl	Broadway revival
2008	Miss Saigon	Kim	The Muny, St. Louis
2010	Miss Saigon	Kim	Toronto (second production)
2011	Miss Saigon	Kim	Broadway at Music Circus, Wells Fargo Pavilion, Sacramento
2013	Cats	Grizabella	Panasonic Theatre, Toronto
2017–2018	The Secret Garden		Theatre Calgary
2019	Next to Normal	Diana Goodman	Musical Stage Company / Mirvish, Toronto
2020	Lady Sunrise	Tawny	Factory Theatre, Toronto (world premiere)
2022	Lesson in Forgetting		Young Centre for the Performing Arts, Toronto (English-language world premiere)
2022	Billy & the Dreamerz	Elsie	Toronto Fringe Festival
2024	Ma-Buhay	Gloria / Galinda	Rainbow Stage, Winnipeg (world premiere)
2026	The Tale of the Gifted Prince	Woman	Theatre Calgary (world premiere)
2026	Divine Women 2: A Celebration of Iconic Female Performers	Performer	Victoria Playhouse Petrolia
2026	Daan: A Journey Through Song	Performer	Royal Manitoba Theatre Centre, Winnipeg
2026	Anne of Green Gables – The Musical™		Confederation Centre of the Arts, Charlottetown
2026	Come from Away		Confederation Centre of the Arts, Charlottetown
