= Emir Hadžihafizbegović =

Bosnian actor (born 1961)

- Born: 20 August 1961 (age 64); Tuzla, PR Bosnia and Herzegovina, FPR Yugoslavia
- Education: Academy of Performing Arts, Sarajevo
- Occupation: Actor
- Years active: 1985–present
- Political party: Party of Democratic Action (1990–present)
- Spouse: Aida Hadžihafizbegović
- Children: 2

Emir Hadžihafizbegović (Bosnian pronunciation: [ˈemir ˈhaʤiˈhafizˌbegovitɕ]; born 20 August 1961) is a Bosnian actor. Often regarded as one of the best actors from Bosnia and Herzegovina, he has appeared in over fifty films, including When Father Was Away on Business (1985), Remake (2003), Fuse (2003), Days and Hours (2004), The Border Post (2006), Grbavica (2006), Armin (2007), Vegetarian Cannibal (2012), Men Don't Cry (2017), The Son (2019), Quo Vadis, Aida? (2020) and Beautiful Evening, Beautiful Day (2024).

For his role as struggling husband and father Ivo in the drama film These Are the Rules (2014), Hadžihafizbegović was awarded the Best Actor or Actress Award at the 71st Venice International Film Festival. He was also nominated for a Silver Bear for Best Actor at the 65th Berlin International Film Festival for the same role. On television, he has most notably acted in the sitcoms Lud, zbunjen, normalan (2007–2021) and Konak kod Hilmije (2018–2019).

== Early life and education ==
Hadžihafizbegović was born on 20 August 1961 in the city Tuzla, PR Bosnia and Herzegovina, while it was a part of FPR Yugoslavia. His parents were Mustafa (born 1929—2025) and Nizama. He has an older brother named Irfan.

Originally an aspiring sports reporter, Hadžihafizbegović moved to Sarajevo and entered the Academy of Performing Arts in 1982, receiving his diploma in 1986.

== Acting career ==
Hadžihafizbegović made his film debut as Fahro Zulfikarpašić in the film When Father Was Away on Business (1985), written by Abdulah Sidran and directed by Emir Kusturica. He appeared in two television films and a guest role on a Yugoslav television series before landing the role of a bartender from Bosansko Grahovo in the 1987 film Hajde da se volimo 2 with Bosnian pop star Lepa Brena, as well popular Yugoslav actors Bata Živojinović and Dragomir Bojanić. Hadžihafizbegović revisited his role in Hajde da se volimo 3 (1990).

His career went on hiatus in 1992 due to the breakup of Yugoslavia and the breakout of war in Bosnia and Herzegovina. Hadžihafizbegović reappeared in Bosnian cinema in the 2003 war film Remake, by screenwriter Zlatko Topčić. Since that film, Hadžihafizbegović has appeared in 40 more films, mostly as a lead role. He has played in a number of sitcoms as well, including Lud, zbunjen, normalan and Konak kod Hilmije.

== Political career ==
Hadžihafizbegović has been part of the Party of Democratic Action (SDA) since its foundation. From 2007 to 2011, he held the position of Minister of Culture and Sports of Sarajevo Canton. Hadžihafizbegović was part of the SDA presidency from 2019 until 2023.

== Controversies ==
=== Fatal car accident ===
Hadžihafizbegović was involved in a fatal car accident on the night of 12 October 2014 in the village Bročice near Novska, Croatia, when he accidentally hit the driver and one of the two passengers of another car who were standing on the left side of the highway repairing a flat tire. One of the people he hit was 63-year-old Ankica Kuduz, mother of Croatian model Lana Kuduz, who died soon after of her injuries in a Nova Gradiška hospital. The driver and Hadžihafizbegović were also hospitalized with non-life-threatening injuries.

On 11 March 2016, Hadžihafizbegović admitted guilt and was put on probation for four years and sentenced to one year imprisonment by the Municipal Criminal Court in Sisak, which would be suspended if he does not commit another criminal offense by 2020. Expert witness testimony at the trial also established that the actor had exceeded the speed limit the night of the accident and had attempted to drive around a parked car. Following the crash, Hadžihafizbegović befriended the victim's daughter, Lana.

=== Corruption scandal ===
On 28 February 2020, Hadžihafizbegović found himself in the middle of a corruption scandal. On 3 March 2020, the Party of Democratic Action, of which he is a member, announced that Hadžihafizbegović would not be the new Minister of Culture and Sports of Sarajevo Canton because of the scandal.

=== Conflicts with journalists ===
On 19 January 2018, Hadžihafizbegović insulted and then kicked a journalist out of his office. On 5 March 2020, the video of Hadžihafizbegović insulting a journalist after a question about dubious allocation of funds of the Foundation for Cinematography of which he is a board member was posted on YouTube.

=== Fake lordship title ===
On 31 January 2020, Hadžihafizbegović announced that he had received a lordship title. Considering that he could not theoretically receive that title, it was revealed that he had purchased it online for $49.

== Personal life ==
Hadžihafizbegović's wife is Aida. Together they have two children: a son Edin (born 1990) and a daughter Amra (born 1994).

In 2013, he received Croatian citizenship.

== Filmography ==
=== Feature films ===
- Ada (1985)
- When Father Was Away on Business (1985)
- Ovni in mamuti (1985)
- Život radnika (1987)
- Hajde da se volimo 2 (1989)
- Stanica običnih vozova (1990)
- Hajde da se volimo 3 (1990)
- Prokleta je Amerika (1992)
- Remake (2003)
- Fuse (2003)
- Summer in the Golden Valley (2003)
- Days and Hours (2004)
- First Class Thieves (2005)
- Well Tempered Corpses (2005)
- Grbavica (2006)
- The Border Post (2006)
- The Melon Route (2006)
- All for Free (2006)
- Armin (2007)
- It's Hard to be Nice (2007)
- Snow (2008)
- The Tour (2008)
- Metastases (2009)
- Buick Riviera (2009)
- The Blacks (2009)
- Donkey (2009)
- Neke druge priče (2010)
- Stanje šoka (2011)
- Vegetarian Cannibal (2012)
- Death of a Man in the Balkans (2012)
- Šanghaj (2012)
- Led (2012)
- Circles (2013)
- Falsifier (2013)
- Odumiranje (2013)
- Čefurji raus! (2013)
- Children of the Sun (2013)
- Quiet People (2014)
- The Kids from the Marx and Engels Street (2014)
- These Are the Rules (2014)
- Žaba (2015)
- Smrdljiva bajka (2015)
- Our Everyday Life (2015)
- Men Don't Cry (2017)
- The Frog (2017)
- The Son (2019)
- Quo Vadis, Aida? (2020)
- Koncentriši se, baba (2020)
- Praznik rada (2022)
- Beautiful Evening, Beautiful Day (2024)

=== Television films ===
- Veliki talenat (1984)
- Audicija (1985)
- Ćao, ćao, bambina! (1988)
- Nepitani (1999)
- Borac (2001)

=== Television series ===
- Vrijeme prošlo (1986)
- Specijalna redakcija (1989–1990)
- Obećana zemlja (2002)
- Viza za budućnost (2003–2004)
- Crna hronika (2004)
- Bitange i princeze (2005)
- Večernja škola: Povratak upisanih (2005)
- Naša mala klinika (2006, 2011)
- Tata i zetovi (2006–2007)
- Odmori se, zaslužio si (2007)
- Lud, zbunjen, normalan (2007–2021)
- Luda kuća (2010)
- Turneja (2011)
- Dva smo svijeta različita (2011)
- Ne diraj mi mamu (2018)
- Konak kod Hilmije (2018–2019)
- Na rubu pameti (2022–2023)
- San Snova (2023–2024)

=== Short films ===
- 42 ½ (2003)
- Prva plata (2005)
- Ram za sliku moje domovine (2005; documentary short)
- Vidimo se u Sarajevu (2008)

== Achievements ==
Hadžihafizbegović received the Golden Arena for Best Actor at the Pula Film Festival and Best Actor Award at the Durban International Film Festival. On the final day of the 71st Venice International Film Festival on 6 September 2014, he was awarded the Venice Horizons Award for Best Actor or Actress in the film These Are the Rules.

=== Awards and nominations ===
Year	Award	Category	Nominated work	Result	Ref.
2006	Golden Arena	Best Supporting Actor	The Border Post	Won	
2007	Golden Arena	Best Actor	Armin	Won	
2007	Best Actor Award	Best Actor	Armin	Won	
2014	Venice Horizons Award	Best Actor or Actress	These Are the Rules	Won	
2015	Silver Bear	Best Actor	These Are the Rules	Nominated	
2015	Golden Arena	Best Actor	These Are the Rules	Won	
2015	Heart of Sarajevo	Best Actor	These Are the Rules	Nominated	

=== Honorary awards ===
Year	Organizations	Award	Result	Ref.
2026	Sarajevo Film Festival	Honorary Heart of Sarajevo Award	Honoured	
