= The Waiting Room (2015 film) =

- Film poster
- Directed by: Igor Drljaca
- Written by: Igor Drljaca
- Produced by: Munire Armstrong; Jordan Barker; Borga Dorter; Igor Drljaca; Albert Shin
- Starring: Jasmin Geljo; Ma-Anne Dionisio; Cynthia Ashperger; Filip Geljo
- Cinematography: Roland Echavarria
- Edited by: Ajla Odobasic
- Production company: Timelapse Pictures
- Distributed by: A71 Entertainment
- Release date: August 7, 2015 (Locarno)
- Running time: 92 minutes
- Country: Canada
- Languages: English; Bosnian

The Waiting Room is a 2015 Canadian drama film written and directed by Igor Drljaca. Loosely based on the life of Jasmin Geljo, the film stars Geljo as an actor once popular in his native country of Yugoslavia, who has struggled to find success since immigrating to Canada.

The film had its world premiere at the Locarno Film Festival in Switzerland, and its North American premiere at the 2015 Toronto International Film Festival. It was picked up by A71 Entertainment and had a limited theatrical release in Canada on June 3, 2016.

== Plot ==
Jasmin, once a successful actor in the former Yugoslavia, now lives in Toronto with his second wife and young son. While juggling a construction job and a busy audition schedule, he dreams of re-launching an old televised stage show that made him famous in his homeland. When he is cast in a role that triggers recollections of the civil war, he is forced to reconcile his current reality with memories of his past success.

== Cast ==
- Jasmin Geljo as Jasmin
- Filip Geljo as Dan
- Masa Lizdek as Daughter
- Ma-Anne Dionisio as Patricia
- Cynthia Ashperger as Azra
- Zeljko Kecojevic as Zoran
- Goran Slavkovic as Miro / Soldier
- Christopher Jacot as Derek
- Inka Malovic as Svetlena

== Production ==
The film combines fiction with biographical elements inspired by Jasmin Geljo's life in Toronto. Geljo was a successful actor in pre-war Sarajevo, and was part of a wildly popular televised stage show Audicija (The Audition). Igor Drljaca notes that he was drawn to the idea of exploring the intersection between reality and fiction within the film, which is a study of an immigrant performer, rather than a film about immigration.

== Release ==
=== Critical reception ===
The Globe and Mail's Barry Hertz praised the film, writing "It's heavy material, but handled with enough sincerity and dexterity by Drljaca – and anchored by Geljo's tremendous lead performance – that its weight is more poignantly impactful than fatally crushing." NOW Magazine's Norman Wilner was less enthused, writing "There’s a stark beauty to Roland Echavarria’s imagery, and Geljo clearly knows his frustrated, melancholy character inside out, but a few ill-advised choices let the air out of The Waiting Room in its final movement."

=== Accolades ===
The film received two Canadian Screen Award nominations at the 4th Canadian Screen Awards in 2016. Jasmin Geljo was nominated for Best Actor and Cynthia Ashperger for Best Supporting Actress.
