= Sorry for Kung Fu =

- Directed by: Ognjen Sviličić
- Written by: Ognjen Sviličić
- Produced by: Vesna Mort
- Starring: Daria Lorenci; Filip Radoš; Vera Zima
- Cinematography: Vedran Šamanović
- Edited by: Vjeran Pavlinić
- Release date: July 22, 2004
- Running time: 70 minutes
- Country: Croatia
- Language: Croatian

Sorry for Kung Fu (Croatian: Oprosti za kung fu) is a 2004 Croatian drama film directed by Ognjen Sviličić. The plot follows a pregnant unmarried woman played by Daria Lorenci, who returns to her village in Croatia after living in Germany during the Croatian War of Independence. Her family labors to find her a husband to avoid a local scandal, not knowing the father is Asian.

== Cast ==
- Daria Lorenci as Mirjana "Mira"
- Filip Radoš as Jozo, Mira's father
- Vera Zima as Kate, Mira'a mother
- Luka Petrušić as Marko, Mira's brother
- Vedran Mlikota as Veliki
- Ivica Bašić as Mate
- Yong Long Dai as Child
- Jadranka Đokić as Zorica
- Barbara Vicković as Nurse
- Mate Curic as Krule
- Milivoj Cace as Jović
- Branimir Rakić as Tadija
- Ivan Brkić as Ljubo
- Jolanda Tudor as Mare
- Josip Zovko as Caco
