= Dora Polić =

Croatian actress (born 1971)

- Born: 30 August 1971 (age 53); Zagreb, Yugoslavia (present-day Croatia)
- Occupation: Actress
- Years active: 1995–present

Dora Polić (born 30 August 1971) is a Croatian theatre, film and television actress. She won a Golden Arena at the 2000 Pula Film Festival.

== Filmography ==
=== Television roles ===
- Stipe u gostima as dr. Pilzner (2012)
- Provodi i sprovodi as Barbara Premijum (2011)
- Bitange i princeze as Nina Majer (2007)
- Smogovci (1996)

=== Movie roles ===
- Neka ostane među nama as Milka (2010)
- Čovjek ispod stola as mlada majka (2009)
- Crna kronika ili dan žena (2000)
- Blagajnica hoće ići na more as Barica (2000)
- Kanjon opasnih igara kao Mande (1998)
- Tri muškarca Melite Žganjer as TV secretary (1998)
- Prepoznavanje as girlfriend in cinema (1996)
- Posebna vožnja (1995)
- Isprani (1995)
