= The Fifth Day of Peace =

1970 film by Giuliano Montaldo

- English DVD cover
- Directed by: Giuliano Montaldo
- Written by: Andrea Barbato; Lucio Battistrada; Ottavio Jemma; Giuliano Montaldo
- Produced by: Silvio Clementelli
- Starring: Richard Johnson; Franco Nero; Larry Aubrey; Helmuth Schneider; Michael Goodliffe; Bud Spencer
- Cinematography: Silvano Ippoliti
- Edited by: Franco Fraticelli
- Music by: Ennio Morricone
- Production companies: Clesi Cinematografica; Jadran Film
- Distributed by: Euro International Films (Italy)
- Release date: 17 April 1970 (Italy)
- Running time: 113 minutes
- Countries: Italy; Yugoslavia

The Fifth Day of Peace (original Italian title: Gott mit uns, German for "God With Us") is a 1970 war drama film directed and co-written by Giuliano Montaldo, and starring Richard Johnson, Franco Nero, Helmuth Schneider, Michael Goodliffe and Bud Spencer. It dramatizes the May 1945 German deserter execution, in which two German prisoners-of-war in a Canadian-run camp were executed by their comrades for cowardice. The film was an international co-production between Italian and Yugoslavian companies, filmed at Jadran Studios in Zagreb.

== Plot ==
Two German deserters, Kriegsmarine Ensign Bruno Grauber and Army Corporal Reiner Schultz are captured by the Canadian Army at the end of World War II. They are interned in a Canadian-run POW camp in the Netherlands, where the senior German officer, Colonel von Bleicher, is a career officer. Their fellow German prisoners of war, led by Von Bleicher, discover that they are deserters. They are put through a formal military court martial organised by Von Bleicher and charged with cowardice. They are sentenced to death and are to be executed on the "fifth day of peace". Von Bleicher pressures the Canadian camp commandant, Captain Miller, to allow the execution to be carried out and requests rifles and ammunition to carry out the sentence.

Captain Miller's superior officer, General Snow, persuades (but does not order) him to allow the execution to be carried out for the higher purpose of preserving military discipline. He also motivates Miller with a promotion to major.

== Cast ==
- Richard Johnson as Capt. Miller
- Franco Nero as Ens. Bruno Grauber
- Helmuth Schneider as Col. von Bleicher
- Larry Aubrey as Cpl. Reiner Schultz
- Bud Spencer as Cpl. Jelinek
- Michael Goodliffe as Gen. Snow
- Relja Bašić as Lt. George Romney
- T. P. McKenna as Nick
- Graham Armitage as Mark
- Torello Angeli as Lt. Vaschel
- Emilio Delle Piane as Gleason
- Enrico Osterman as Trevor
- Renato Romano as Sgt. Malley
- Sven Lasta as Capt. Bosch
- Demeter Bitenc as Maj. Brandt
- Oswaldo Ruggeri as Capt. Warner
- Zlatko Madunić as Moeller

== Historical background ==
This movie is based on the true story of two Kriegsmarine sailors, leading seaman Bruno Dorfer and machinist's mate Rainer Beck, both executed for desertion on 13 May 1945, after being found guilty of cowardice by fellow POWs. The sentence was carried out by German POWs who were under Canadian custody.

== Production ==
The film was shot at Jadran Film Studios in Zagreb, Croatia (then a part of Yugoslavia). Ronald Brittain was the film's military advisor.

The original title of the film, "Gott mit uns", is a Prussian phrase traditionally associated with the German armed forces. During the Second World War, Wehrmacht soldiers wore this slogan on their belt buckles.

== Release and reception ==
The film premiered in Milan on 17 April 1970. At the 1970 Karlovy Vary International Film Festival, the film was nominated for the Crystal Globe, but lost to Kes.

In Canada, where it was released under the title Firing Squad, the film was met with controversy.

=== Accolades ===
Institution	Year	Category	Nominee	Result
Nastro d'Argento	1971	Best Director	Giuliano Montaldo	Nominated
Nastro d'Argento	1971	Best Producer	Silvio Clementelli	Won
Karlovy Vary International Film Festival	1970	Crystal Globe	Giuliano Montaldo	Nominated
