= Wish I Were a Shark =

1999 film by Ognjen Sviličić

Wish I Were a Shark (Da mi je biti morski pas) is a 1999 Croatian film written and directed by Ognjen Sviličić, starring Vedran Mlikota and Josip Zovko.

== Sources ==
- Da mi je biti morski pas at lzmk.hr (in Croatian)
