= Timon (film) =

1973 film by Tomislav Radić

Timon is a 1973 Yugoslavian film directed by Tomislav Radić. It is based on William Shakespeare's tragedy Timon of Athens.

== Plot ==
A theater premiere of Timon of Athens ends with a rapturous applause from the audience, and Boris, the lead actor (Boris Buzančić), is congratulated for having played the role of his lifetime. Encouraged by the sense of his own worth, he starts a romantic affair with a prompter, spurring gossip in the theater. The ensemble embarks on a tour, but as their performances achieve more success, Boris is becoming less liked among his colleagues, and he begins to experience the fate of the character he is playing...
