= Luka Petrušić =

Croatian actor

- Born: 15 September 1982 (age 43); Zagreb, Yugoslavia
- Occupation: Actor
- Years active: 1997-present

Luka Petrušić (born 15 September 1982) is a Croatian actor. He appeared in more than thirty films since 1997.

== Selected filmography ==
Year	Title	Role	Notes
1998	I Want You	Honda	
2004	100 Minutes of Glory		
2004	Sorry for Kung Fu	Marko	
2008	Pratioci		Short film
2009	The Man Under the Table		
