= Cashier Wants to Go to the Seaside =

- Croatian: Blagajnica hoće ići na more
- Directed by: Dalibor Matanić
- Produced by: Ankica Jurić-Tilić
- Starring: Dora Polić; Ivan Brkić
- Cinematography: Branko Linta
- Edited by: Tomislav Pavlić
- Music by: Svadbas
- Production company: Croatian; Radiotelevision
- Release date: July 2000 (Croatia)
- Running time: 86 minutes
- Country: Croatia
- Language: Croatian

Cashier Wants to Go to the Seaside (Croatian: Blagajnica hoće ići na more) is a 2000 Croatian comedy film directed by Dalibor Matanić.

== Cast ==
- Dora Polić as Barica
- Ivan Brkić as Miljenko
- Milan Štrljić as Police Detective
- Nina Violić as Jadranka
- Vera Zima as Štefica
- Hana Hegedušić as Željka
- Mirjana Rogina as Đurđa
- Danko Ljuština as Đurđa's Husband
- Anita Diaz as Tonka
- Marija Kohn as Old Thieving Lady
- Vlasta Knezović as Miljenko's Wife
- Branko Meničanin as Menial Worker
- Vlatko Dulić as Professor
- Drago Diklić as Himself
