= Foreign Tongue =

2026 Canadian comedy film

- Directed by: Boris Mojsovski
- Written by: Boris Mojsovski; Cynthia Ashperger
- Based on: Foreign Tongue by Cynthia Ashperger
- Produced by: Munire Armstrong; Felipe Rodriguez; Boris Mojsovski
- Starring: Kimberly-Sue Murray; Steve Byers; Cynthia Ashperger; Jasmin Geljo
- Cinematography: Fraser Brown
- Edited by: Julia Blua
- Music by: Marcel Castillo
- Production companies: YN Films; A Thousand Lights Dark
- Release date: September 18, 2026 (Oldenburg)
- Running time: 104 minutes
- Country: Canada
- Languages: English; Bosnian

Foreign Tongue is a Canadian comedy film, directed by Boris Mojsovski and released in 2026. The film stars Kimberly-Sue Murray as Kathy, a woman who begins suffering from foreign accent syndrome following an accident; now speaking with a Bosnian accent, she begins to be treated as an outsider because she no longer sounds like everybody else in her own community, opening her up to a new understanding of the immigrant experience, as well as a potential new romance with David (Steve Byers), a man entranced by her "exotic" accent.

The cast also includes Cynthia Ashperger, Janet Porter, Rachel Ancheril, Cas Anvar, Jasmin Geljo, Greg Bryk, Paulino Nunes and Mladen Obradovic in supporting roles.

The film was shot in Toronto and North Bay in summer 2025. The screenplay was co-written by Mojsovski and Ashperger, based on a stage musical Ashperger had previously written. Mojsovski attributed the strength of Murray's performance of a Bosnian accent to the presence on set of himself, Ashperger, Geljo and Obradovic, all immigrants to Canada from the Balkans whose accents she could emulate as well as receiving direct coaching and guidance.

The film premiered on September 18, 2026, at the Oldenburg International Film Festival, followed by its Canadian premiere at the 2026 Cinéfest Sudbury International Film Festival.
