= Armin (film) =

- Directed by: Ognjen Sviličić
- Written by: Ognjen Sviličić
- Produced by: Marcelo Busse; Mirko Galić; Markus Halberschmit; Ademir Kenović; Damir Terešak
- Starring: Emir Hadžihafizbegović; Armin Omerović
- Cinematography: Stanko Herceg; Vedran Šamanović
- Edited by: Vjeran Pavlinić
- Music by: Michael Bauer
- Release date: 9 February 2007 (Berlin Film Festival)
- Running time: 82 minutes
- Country: Croatia
- Languages: Bosnian; Croatian; German; English

Armin is a 2007 Croatian-Bosnian drama film directed by Ognjen Sviličić that premiered at the 2007 Berlin Film Festival.

== Plot ==
The film follows Ibro (Emir Hadžihafizbegović) and his son Armin (Armin Omerović), who travel from a small town in Bosnia to a film audition in Zagreb, hoping to land a part for Armin in a German film about the war in Bosnia. On their way to fulfilling the boy's dream, they encounter a series of disappointing setbacks — their bus to Zagreb breaks down and they are late for the audition. After Ibro convinces the director to give the boy a second chance, they soon realize that Armin is too old for the part anyway. As it becomes obvious that Armin's dream of playing a part in the movie will never happen, he feels increasingly disheartened, while Ibro's determination to help his son grows. Finally they do get another chance, but Armin buckles under the pressure and experiences an epileptic seizure. As they get ready to head back to Bosnia, the film crew makes an unexpected offer, but when Ibro refuses, Armin at last realizes how much his father really loves him.

== Awards ==
Armin was selected to be Croatia's submission for the Best Foreign Language Film at the 80th Academy Awards. The film was also screened at a number of film festivals, including the Berlin Film Festival, the Karlovy Vary Film Festival, the Tribeca Film Festival, the Palm Springs Film Festival and Durban Film Festival. It received the following awards:

- 2007 Durban International Film Festival
  - Best Actor (Emir Hadžihafizbegović)
- 2007 Festróia - Tróia International Film Festival
  - Silver Dolphin for Best Screenplay (Ognjen Sviličić)
- 2007 Karlovy Vary International Film Festival
  - East of West Award
- 2007 Pula Film Festival
  - Golden Arena for Best Actor (Emir Hadžihafizbegović)
  - Golden Arena for Best Screenplay (Ognjen Sviličić)
- 2008 Palm Springs International Film Festival
  - FIPRESCI Award for Best Foreign Language Film of 2007
- Zerkalo Film Festival, Russia, 2007
  - Best actor award (Emir Hadzihafizbegovic)
