= Jasmin Geljo =

Bosnian-Canadian actor (born 1959)

- Born: September 18, 1959 (age 66); Sarajevo, PR Bosnia and Herzegovina, FPR Yugoslavia
- Education: Academy of Performing Arts in Sarajevo
- Occupation: Actor
- Years active: 1982–present
- Children: Filip Geljo

Jasmin Geljo (born September 18, 1959) is a Bosnian-Canadian actor. He is best known for his roles in Cube Zero, as Ryjkin, and in the films Land of the Dead, Assault on Precinct 13 and The Sentinel. He also appears in Schitt's Creek (2015–2020) as Ivan.

Before the Bosnian War, Geljo was mostly known for his roles as Mima Šiš and Roki Mokroguz in the Yugoslav and Bosnian cult show Audicija (Audition).

== Early work ==
Geljo was born in Sarajevo, PR Bosnia and Herzegovina, FPR Yugoslavia. He graduated acting at the Academy of Performing Arts in Sarajevo. At only eleven years of age, he made his first film called Boy with a Violin. After completing high school, he studied drama at the University of Sarajevo's Academy of Dramatic Arts, taught by professor Boro Stjepanović and world-renowned director Emir Kusturica.

By the second year of the four-year-long academic program, Geljo started getting principal roles in film, television, and theatre in the former Yugoslavia. In 1985, he played a role in Kusturica's film When Father Was Away on Business, which received a Golden Palm for best film of the year at the Cannes Film Festival. After graduating from the Academy, he appeared in numerous productions all over former Yugoslavia.

Geljo is also known for his roles as Mima Šiš and Roki Mokroguz in the famous Yugoslav and Bosnian show Audicija.

== Career in Canada ==
Geljo relocated to Toronto, Ontario, Canada in 1993 and continued his acting. He has since expanded his repertoire to include film production as well.

In 2016, Geljo received a Canadian Screen Award nomination for Best Actor at the 4th Canadian Screen Awards, for his performance in the film The Waiting Room. He subsequently received a nomination for Best Lead Performance in a Drama Film at the 14th Canadian Screen Awards in 2026 for his performance in Cat's Cry.

== Filmography ==
=== Film ===
- Noć strijepnje (1982)
- Pismo – Glava (1983)
- Samek (1983)
- Provincija u pozadini (1984)
- Veliki talenat (1984)
- When Father Was Away on Business (1985)
- Audicija (1985) as Mima Šiš
- Azra (1988) as Ibro
- Čovjek koji je znao gdje je sjever a gdje jug (1989) as Ivan
- Hajde da se volimo 2 (1989) as Vatrogasac 1
- Sa 204-272 (1991) as Otas
- Nova Audicija (1991) as Mima Šiš and Roki Mokroguz
- Voajer (1992)
- Peacekeepers (1997) as Cowboy
- After Alice (2000) as Immigrant Husband
- Beyond Borders (2003) as Truck Driver
- Cube Zero (2004) as Ryjkin
- Left Behind: World at War (2005) as Russian Officer
- Neil (2005) as Davor
- Land of the Dead (2005) as Tambourine Man
- Assault on Precinct 13 (2005) as Marko
- Citizen Duane (2006) as Barber
- The Battery-Powered Duckling (2006) as The Guard
- Skinwalkers (2006) as Cabin Person #1
- The Sentinel (2006) as Assassin
- Stir of Echoes: The Homecoming (2007) as Maintenance Man
- Snijeg (2008) as Miro
- Gangster Exchange (2009) as Gogo Wolf
- The Shrine (2010) as Purple Cloaked Man #2
- The Waiting Room (2015)
- Scaffold (2017)
- Violation (2020) as Ivan
- The White Fortress (2021)
- The Last Mark (2022) as Oslo
- Cat's Cry (Mačji krik) (2024)
- Foreign Tongue (2026)

=== Television ===
- Brisani prostor (1985) as Bili (3 episodes)
- ZOS: Zone of Separation (2009) as Vilko the Red (3 episodes)
- Schitt's Creek (2015–2020) as Ivan
- Air Emergencies; Locomotiv hockey team disaster (2013) as first officer Igor Javielov (1 episode)
- Titans (2021) as Conductor (1 episode)
- The Boys (2022) as "Big Nina" Oligarch (1 episode)
