= Vera Zima =

Croatian actress (1953–2020)

- Born: Vjeročka Zimova; 21 March 1953; Metković, PR Croatia, FPR Yugoslavia
- Died: 7 November 2020 (aged 67); Zagreb, Croatia
- Education: Academy of Dramatic Art
- Alma mater: University of Zagreb
- Occupation: Actress
- Years active: 1975–2020

Vjeročka Zimova (21 March 1953 – 7 November 2020), better known as Vera Zima, was a Croatian actress.

She appeared in more than fifty films since 1975. She was of paternal Slovak descent.

== Selected filmography ==
Year	Title	Role	Notes
2009	Metastases		
2004	Long Dark Night		
2004	Sorry for Kung Fu		
2002	Winter in Rio		
2000	Cashier Wants to Go to the Seaside		
1999	Četverored		
1985	Love Letters with Intent		
1979	Journalist		
