= My Dear Angel =

My Dear Angel (Anđele moj dragi) is a Croatian film directed by Tomislav Radić. It was released in 1995.
