= Tressette: A Story of an Island =

Tressette: A Story of an Island (Trešeta) is a 2006 Croatian film directed by Dražen Žarković.

== Plot ==
Four friends, Martin, Šime, Nikša and Milan, who live on a small Dalmatian Adriatic island, often get together for a game of tressette. When Milan suddenly dies, the three remaining friends start looking for his tressette replacement. They try to interest several locals in joining them, and as their search for the fourth card player continues, the fates of the islanders start to intertwine in unusual ways, and some well-kept secrets emerge.
