= Beautiful Evening, Beautiful Day =

- Promotional release poster
- Directed by: Ivona Juka
- Written by: Ivona Juka
- Produced by: Anita Juka
- Starring: Emir Hadžihafizbegović; Elmir Krivalić; Dado Ćosić; Slaven Došlo; Đorđe Galić
- Cinematography: Dragan Ruljancic
- Edited by: Nenad Pirnat; Nina Velnic
- Music by: Michael Brook
- Production companies: 4film Quiet Revolution Pictures; ORKA Production Studio; Caretta Films; Depo Production; Tastemaker Studios
- Release date: September 9, 2024 (Croatia)
- Running time: 131 minutes
- Countries: Croatia; Poland; Canada; Cyprus; Bosnia and Herzegovina
- Language: Croatian

Beautiful Evening, Beautiful Day (Croatian: Lijepa večer, lijep dan) is a 2024 drama film written and directed by Ivona Juka. It stars Emir Hadžihafizbegović, Elmir Krivalić, Dado Ćosić, Slaven Došlo, and Đorđe Galić.

A Croatian-language international co-production between Croatia, Poland, Canada, Cyprus, and Bosnia and Herzegovina, the film was filmed in Croatia, and selected as the Croatian entry for Best International Feature Film at the 97th Academy Awards but was not nominated.

== Synopsis ==
Lovro and his friends Nenad, Stevan, and Ivan rebelled against the Nazi regime and joined the Yugoslav Partisans. Sixteen years later, they are renowned artists who feel entitled to criticize the society for which they fought. Although they are veterans worthy of the Yugoslav Partisans, the party does not like the films they create, and the party hires Agent Emir to sabotage their work when their sexuality becomes suspicious.

== Cast ==
- Emir Hadžihafizbegović
- Elmir Krivalić
- Dado Ćosić
- Slaven Došlo
- Đorđe Galić
- Goran Grgić
- Asja Jovanovic
- Milica Mihajlović
- Vedran Mlikota
- Enes Vejzović
- Marko Braić
- Anja Šovagović
- Matija Prskalo

== Release ==
It had a limited release at Kino Forum on September 9, 2024.

== See also ==
- List of submissions to the 97th Academy Awards for Best International Feature Film
- List of Croatian submissions for the Academy Award for Best International Feature Film
