= Tomislav Radić =

- Born: 8 December 1940; Zagreb, Kingdom of Yugoslavia
- Died: 7 March 2015 (aged 74); Zagreb, Croatia
- Occupation(s): Film director, screenwriter
- Years active: 1972–2015

Tomislav Radić (8 December 1940 – 7 March 2015) was a Croatian film director and screenwriter.

== Biography ==
Born in Zagreb, Radić graduated from both University of Zagreb's Faculty of Humanities and Social Sciences and Academy of Dramatic Art. Lived in Zagreb, was two times married and has three children: two daughters and a son. In the 1960s Radić made a name for himself as a theatre director, with his greatest success being a stage production of Raymond Queneau's Exercises in Style, which has been continuously on the program of &TD Theatre in Zagreb since 1968 to this day.

He then turned to television and directed a number of documentaries and drama series for TV Zagreb, before his first feature film debut Živa istina in 1972. He continued directing feature films and television dramas throughout the several decades. His best acclaimed feature films are What Iva Recorded (2005) and Kotlovina (2011), which both won the Big Golden Arena for Best Film at the Pula Film Festival, Croatia's national film award festival.

He died on 7 March 2015.

== Filmography ==
- Živa istina (1972)
- Timon (1973)
- Luka (1992)
- Anđele moj dragi (1995)
- The Miroslav Holding Co. (2001)
- What Iva Recorded (2005)
- Three Stories About Sleeplessness (2008)
- Kotlovina (2011)
