= Vlaho Stulli =

Croatian-Ragusan poet, playwright and public servant

Vlaho Stulli (Vlaho Stulić)
- Vlaho Stullić
- Born: Vlaho Stulli; 8 October 1768; Dubrovnik
- Died: 19 December 1843 (aged 75); Dubrovnik
- Citizenship: Republic of Ragusa
- Occupations: writer, poet, comediographer, public servant
- Writing career
- Language: Croatian, Latin, Italian
- Genres: comedy, diary, poetry
- Notable works: Kate Sukurica (comedy; also known as Kate Kapuralica, suggested by Mihovil Kombol); Diario (diary)
- Literary movement: realism, naturalism

Vlaho Stulli (Croatised as Vlaho Stulić; 8 October 1768 – 19 December 1843), was a Croatian and Ragusan poet, playwright and public servant of the Republic of Ragusa. Influenced by Croatian-Ragusan writers Nikola Nalješković and Marin Držić, as well as Italian Carlo Goldoni, he is best known for his naturalistic satire comediographic work Kate Sukurica in Croatian, Diario (Diary) in Italian and epigrams in Latin language, written to his friends. Stulli lived and wrote during the period of the stronger influence of the French language and literature ("French wave" known as frančezarija) in Dubrovnik, whose writers and playwrights translated many of Molière's comedies into Croatian, adapting them to local idiom and mentality, as well as influences of Latin language, Italian language theatre troupes and style-pluralistic Croatian literature; the 18th century being considered the "golden century" of Ragusan literature. Stulli is the most prominent representative of the late 18th-century Ragusan drama and his comedy Kate Kapularica the best Ragusan play of that time.

== Works ==
- Kate Kapuralica: Među vratima od Peskarije učinjena u Dubrovniku god. 1800. od V. S., Ragusa, 1800.
  - Theatrically premiered in 1966 in the Croatian National Theatre, Split.
  - Reprints in 1973 and 1996
- Diario, 1962. (posthumously published)

His works were included in several anthologies:

- Per le nozze del signor cavaliere Gianluca Garagnin e della signora Francesca Borelli poesie, Ragusa: dalle stampe di Antonio Martechini, MDCCCX.
- Per le faustissime nozze del sig. cavaliere Geremia Gaguitsch... colla signora Eustachia Lucich: versi, Ragusa: Per Antonio Martecchini, 1826.
- A perpetua onoranza del padre Franc. M. Appendini delle scuole pie, direttore generale dei ginnasii della Dalmazia e del Liceo-convitto di Zara. I suoi amici ed alunni di Ragusa, Ragusa: coi tipi di Pietro Francesco Martecchini, 1838.
- A memoria perenne dell' amato vescovo monsignor Antonio Giuriceo... questo funebre serto tributa la beneficata popolazione di Ragusa, Vienna: Coi tipi dei rr. pp. Mechitaristi, 1842.

== Legacy ==
- Street in Zagreb's neighbourhood of Špansko is named after him (Croatian: ”Ulica Vlahe Stulića”).

== Literature ==
- Prosperov Novak, Slobodan (2003). Povijest hrvatske književnosti (in Croatian). Zagreb: Golden marketing.
- Bogišić, Rafo (1974). "Književnost prosvjetiteljstva". In Marin, Franičević; Franjo, Švelec; Rafo, Bogišić (eds.). Povijest hrvatske književnosti: od renesanse do prosvjetiteljstva. Knjiga 3 (in Croatian). Zagreb: Liber – Mladost.
- Bujadinović, Lorena (2016). Dubrovačka svakodnevica "Među vratima od Peskarije" (BSc) (in Croatian). Josip Juraj Strossmayer University of Osijek, Faculty of Humanities and Social Sciences. Archived from the original on 11 January 2023.
- Jelčić, Dubravko (1997). Povijest hrvatske književnosti (in Croatian). Zagreb: Naklada Pavičić.
- Stulli, Vlaho (1967). "Kate Kapuralica". In Marko, Fotez (ed.). Pet stoljeća hrvatske književnosti, Knjiga 20, Komedije XVII. i XVIII. stoljeća (in Croatian). Zagreb: Matica hrvatska & Zora.
