= Zoran Ferić =

Croatian author and columnist

- Born: 2 June 1961 (age 65); Zagreb, FPR Yugoslavia
- Education: University of Zagreb
- Occupations: Short story writer, novelist and columnist
- Writing career
- Period: 1996–present

Zoran Ferić (born 2 June 1961 in Zagreb, Croatia) is a Croatian writer and columnist who resides in Zagreb. He attended the Ivan Goran Kovačić Elementary School in the city's wealthy neighborhood of Šalata and graduated in Croatian studies at the Faculty of Philosophy at the University of Zagreb. He has written three novels and two collections of short stories. For his literary work, he has received the Ksaver Šandor Gjalski Prize in 2000 and the Jutarnji list Award in 2001. Ferić wrote columns for Nacional, a Croatian weekly. He teaches Croatian at a higher secondary school in Zagreb.

== Books ==
- 1996 – Mišolovka Walta Disneya (Walt Disney's Mousetrap) - (2003 feature film Walt Disney's Mousetrap)
- 1998 – Quattro stagioni (Four Seasons; in co-operation with Miroslav Kiš, Robert Mlinarec and Boris Perić)
- 2000 – Anđeo u ofsajdu (An Angel Offside)
- 2002 – Smrt djevojčice sa žigicama (Death of the Little Match Girl)
- 2003 – Otpusno pismo (Letter of Discharge)
- 2005 – Djeca Patrasa (The Children of Patras)
- 2007 – Simetrija čuda (The Symmetry of the Miracle)
- 2011 – Kalendar Maja (The Maya Calendar)
- 2015 – Na osami blizu mora
- 2019 – San ljetne noći
