= Adam Končić =

Croatian singer and actor

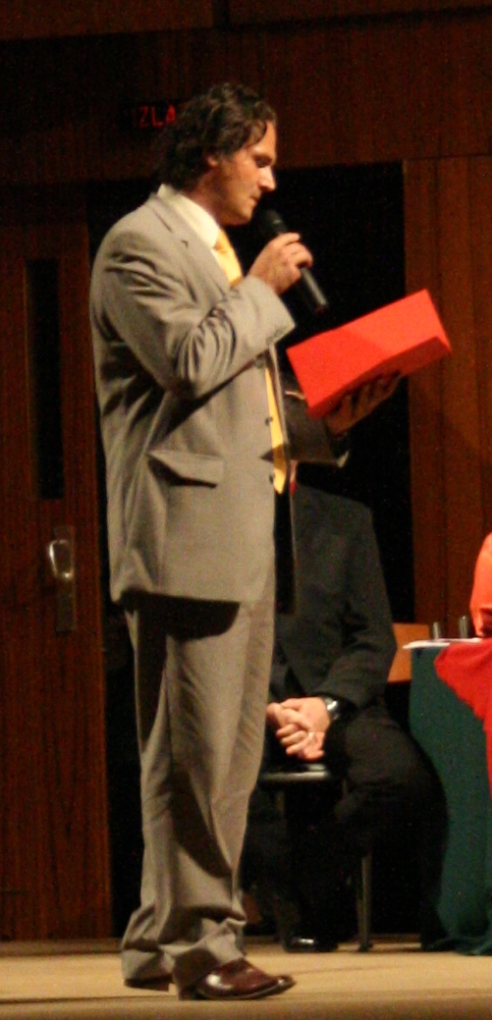
- Born: 28 February 1977 (age 49); Zabok, SFR Yugoslavia (now Croatia)
- Occupations: Singer, actor

Adam Končić (born 28 February 1977) is a Croatian singer and actor. A former member of the quartet Gubec, he has starred in both films and TV series.

== Biography ==
Končić was born in Zabok, in the Zagorje.

In 2021 he was part of a band that sang for the earthquake-stricken Sisak-Moslavina County.

Končić is married to wife Nina and has three children. He reportedly is a supporter of centre-right party HDZ.

== Filmography ==
=== Television roles ===
- Tito (2010)
- Odmori se, zaslužio si as Zdeslav (2010)
- Zakon! as Nelson (2009)
- Ljubav u zaleđu as Krešimir "Krešo" Kovač (2005-2006)

=== Film roles ===
- Penelopa (2009)
- What Iva Recorded as waiter (2005)Pogrešan čovjek
- Long Dark Night (2004)
- Duga ponoć as chaplain (2003)
- Četverored as second investigator (1999)
- Kuća duhova (1998)

== Voice roles ==
- Jura bježi od kuće as Zig and Zag (2007)
