= Cynthia Ashperger =

Croatian-Canadian actress

Cintija Ašperger (born May 4, 1963), credited as Cynthia Ashperger in English-language roles, is a Croatian-Canadian film, television and stage actress.

== Early years ==
Born in Zagreb in 1963, she worked as an actor in Yugoslavia, including in the film S.P.U.K., before meeting Canadian director Allan Eastman when she was cast in the 1987 television film Race for the Bomb. She subsequently married Eastman, and spent the next number of years working in both Canada and Yugoslavia until the outbreak of the Yugoslav Wars in 1991. She moved permanently to Canada in 1995, taking a job as a drama teacher at Ryerson University in Toronto, Ontario.

== Career ==
On stage, her roles have included Out of Spite, a one-woman show based on the writing of Elma Softic; Richard Sanger's Not Spain; and Jordan Tannahill's Feral Child. She has also had television roles in Degrassi and ZOS: Zone of Separation.

In 2026 she both co-wrote and had a supporting role in Boris Mojsovski's film Foreign Tongue, partially adapted from her own stage musical.

== Awards and honors ==
She received a Canadian Screen Award nomination for Best Supporting Actress at the 4th Canadian Screen Awards in 2016 for The Waiting Room, and a Dora Mavor Moore Award nomination for Best Performance by an Actress, Independent Theatre Division, for Feral Child.
