= Danko Ljuština =

Croatian actor (born 1952)

- Born: 24 February 1952 (age 74); Karlovac, PR Croatia, FPR Yugoslavia
- Occupation: Actor
- Years active: 1977-present

Danko Ljuština (born 24 February 1952) is a Croatian actor. He appeared in more than seventy films since 1977.

== Selected filmography ==
Year	Title	Role	Notes
2009	The Lika Cinema		
2005	First Class Thieves		
2003	Horseman		
2001	Go, Yellow		
2000	Cashier Wants to Go to the Seaside		
1983	S.P.U.K.		
