= The Murmur of the Shell =

1990 Croatian film by Miroslav Međimorec

The Murmur of the Shell (Školjka šumi) is a Croatian film directed by Miroslav Međimorec. It was released in 1990.
