= The Miroslav Holding Co. =

2001 film by Tomislav Radić

The Miroslav Holding Co. (original title: Holding) is a Croatian film directed by Tomislav Radić, starring amongst others Jagoda Kaloper and Igor Mešin. It was released in 2001.
