= Hrvoje Hitrec =

Croatian writer and propagandist

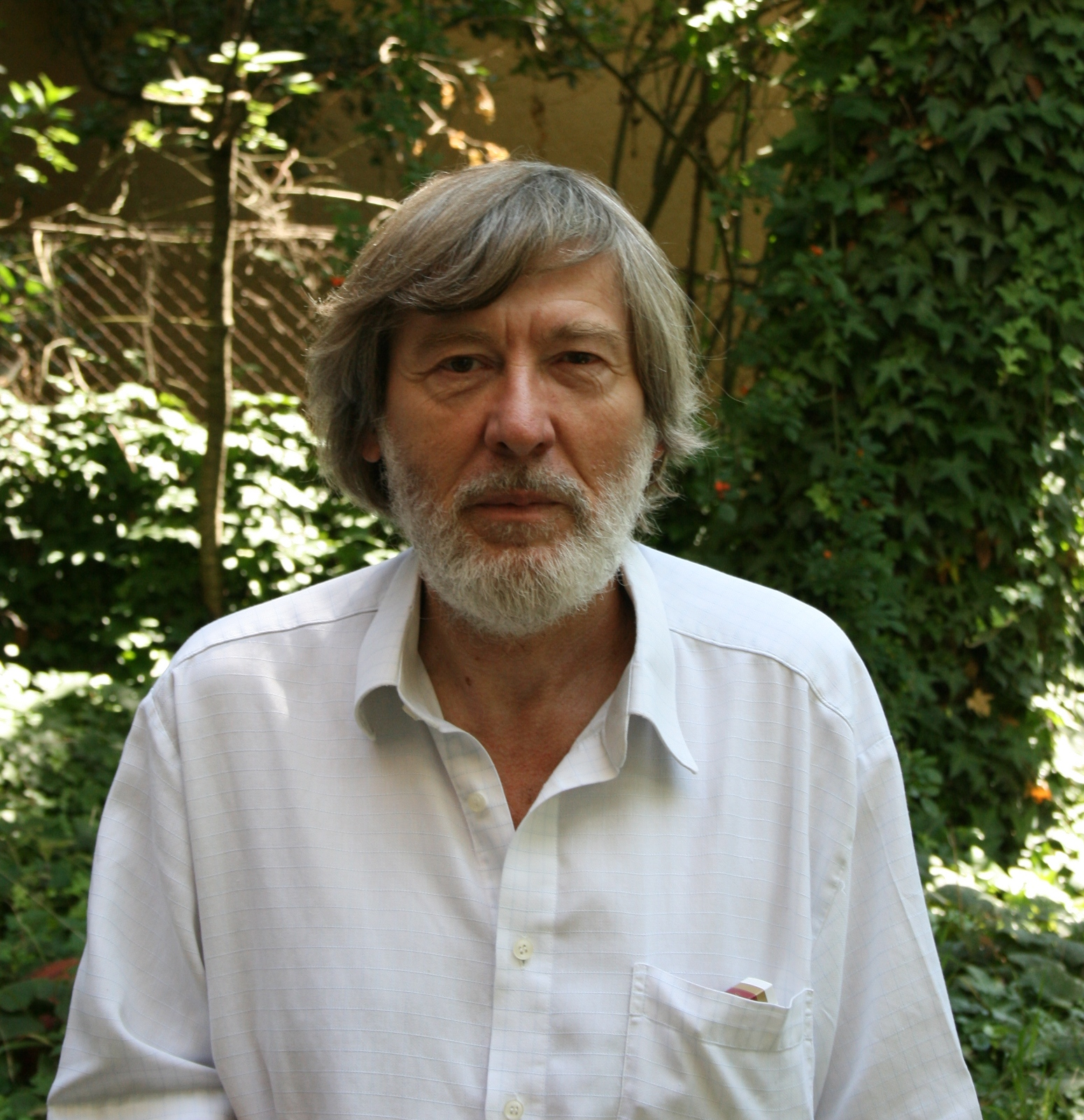

Minister of Information
- In office 4 March 1991 – 17 July 1991
- Prime Minister: Josip Manolić
- Preceded by: Milovan Šibl
- Succeeded by: Branko Salaj

Personal details
- Born: 14 July 1943 (age 83) Zagreb, Independent State of Croatia
- Party: Croatian Democratic Union
- Education: University of Zagreb (Faculty of Humanities and Social Sciences)

Hrvoje Hitrec (born 14 July 1943) is a Croatian writer, screenwriter, and politician. He is notable for his works for children and youth, most famous of his works being the novel (and later a very popular 1980s/90s TV series) Smogovci [hr], but Hitrec also wrote novels, film and TV scripts, dramas. He received several notable Croatian literary awards: "Ksaver Šandor Gjalski," "Ivana Brlić Mažuranić" and "Grigor Vitez."

== Politics ==
Hitrec was a close associate of Franjo Tuđman, the first President of Croatia and an early member of his nationalist Croatian Democratic Union (HDZ) party. In the early 1990s he served as director of the state broadcaster Croatian Radiotelevision, information minister in the government of Josip Manolić, and also a member of Croatian Parliament.

Hitrec headed a right-wing independent list in the 2007 parliamentary elections. He identified himself as eurosceptic, and won 709 votes, or 0.26% of the vote in the VII district.

== Works ==
Books

- "Humandel", Školska knjiga, Zagreb, 2007., ISBN 978-953-0-61231-0
- "Hrvatske legende", Školska knjiga, Zagreb, 2007., ISBN 978-953-0-61222-8
- "Kolarovi", Školska knjiga, Zagreb, 2004., ISBN 953-0-61622-8
- "Matko na štakama", Mosta, Zagreb, 2004., ISBN 953-226-042-0
- "Gradsko kazalište Trešnja 1999.", Zagreb, 1999.
- "Zagreb: hrvatska prijestolnica", Zagreb, 1994.
- "Kanjon opasnih igara", Zagreb, 1994.
- "Ur", SF novel, Zagreb, 1982.
- "Eko Eko", Zagreb, 1979. (9 editions, 2 translations)
- "Smogovci: romančić za nešto stariju djecu i prilično mladu omladinu", Zagreb, 1976. (8 editions)
- "Pustinjakov pupak", Zagreb, 1974.

Films

- Jasenovac – istina, 2016, screenwriter
