= Golden Arena for Best Production Design =

- Country: Yugoslavia (1956–1990); Croatia (1992–present)
- Presented by: Pula Film Festival Jury
- First award: 1956
- Currently held by: Jana Plećaš (2020)
- Website: Official Website

== List of winners ==
The following is a list of winners of the Golden Arena for Best Production Design (also known as Scenography or Scenic design) at the Pula Film Festival.

=== Yugoslav competition (1956–1990) ===
Year	Winner	English title(s)	Original title(s)	Ref.
1956	Želimir Zagotta (shared)	Don't Look Back, My Son	Ne okreći se sine	
1956	Ivo Spinčić (shared)		Dolina miru	
1957	Miomir Denić	Priests Ćira and Spira	Pop Ćira i pop Spira	
1958	Miomir Denić (2)		Četiri kilometra na sat	
1959	Vasilije Popović		Mis Ston	
1960	Duško Jeričević	Atomic War Bride	Rat	
1961	Dime Šumka		Solunski atentatori	
1962	Not awarded.			
1963	Mirko Lipužić (shared)		Samorastniki	
1963	Miomir Denić (3) (shared)		Nevesinjska puška	
1964	Željko Senečić		Pravo stanje stvari	
1965	Vlatko Gilić		Provereno, min nejt	
1966	Not awarded.			
1967	Dragoljub Ivkov		Buđenje pacova	
1968	Nikola Lazarevski		Makedonska krvava svadba	
1969	Niko Matul		Kekčeve ukane	
1970	Bogić Risimović		Biciklisti	
1971	Miodrag Nikolić		Uloga moje porodice u svjetskoj revoluciji	
1972	Vlastimir Gavrik	The Master and Margaret &	Maestro i Margarita & Dan duži od godine	
1973	Niko Matul (2)	Blossoms in Autumn	Cvetje v jeseni / Jesenje cveće	
1974	Vlastimir Gavrik (2)	The Dervish and Death	Derviš i smrt	
1975	Niko Matul (3)		Strah	
1976	Dragoljub Ivkov (2)	Beach Guard in Winter	Čuvar plaže u zimskom periodu	
1977	Drago Turina	The Rat Savior	Izbavitelj	
1978	Niko Matul (4)		Praznovanje pomladi	
1979	Veljko Despotović	Burning & The Man to Destroy	Usijanje & Čovjek koga treba ubiti	
1980	Mirko Lipužić (2)		Ubij me nežno	
1981	Vlastimir Gavrik (3)		Crveniot konj	
1982	Niko Matul (5) (shared)		Pustota	
1982	Janez Kovič (shared)		Pustota	
1983	Niko Matul (6)		Suton	
1984	Veljko Despotović (2)	Strangler vs. Strangler	Davitelj protiv davitelja	
1985	Željko Senečić (2)	Love Letters with Intent	Ljubavna pisma s predumišljajem	
1986	Dinka Jeričević	Three for Happiness	Za sreću je potrebno troje	
1987	Kemal Hrustanović		Život radnika	
1988	Snježana Petrović	The Harms Case	Slučaj Harms	
1989	Slobodan Rundo		Iskušavanje đavola	
1990	Janez Kovič (2)		Do konca i naprej	

=== Croatian competition (1992–present) ===
Year	Winner	English title	Original title	Ref.
1991	Festival was cancelled.^{[A]}			
1992	Željko Senečić (3)	Charuga	Čaruga	
1993	Not Awarded.			
1994	Competition program was cancelled.^{[B]}			
1995	Ivica Trpčić		Anđele moj dragi	
1996	Ivan Ivan	Nausikaya	Nausikaja	
1997	Grubimix Labyrinth	Mondo Bobo	Mondo Bobo	
1998	Vladimir Domitrović	The Three Men of Melita Zganjer	Tri muškarca Melite Žganjer	
1999	Gorana Stepan	Wish I Were a Shark	Da mi je biti morski pas	
2000	Ivica Trpčić (2)		Je li jasno, prijatelju	
2001	Željko Senečić (4)	Slow Surrender	Polagana predaja	
2002	Mladen Ožbolt	Winter in Rio	Prezimiti u Riu	
2003	Ivica Trpčić (3) (shared)	Horseman	Konjanik	
2003	Kemal Hrustanović (2) (shared)	Horseman	Konjanik	
2004	Ivo Hušnjak	The Society of Jesus	Družba Isusova	
2005	Mario Ivezić	Two Players from the Bench	Dva igrača s klupe	
2006	Mladen Ožbolt (2)	The Melon Route	Put lubenica	
2007	Tanja Lacko	Play Me a Love Song	Pjevajte nešto ljubavno	
2008	Mario Ivezić (2)	Will Not End Here	Nije kraj	
2009	Velimir Domitrović (2)	Love Life of a Gentle Coward	Ljubavni život domobrana	
2010	Ivo Hušnjak (2)	Just Between Us	Neka ostane među nama	
2011	Ivo Hušnjak (3)	Lea and Darija	Lea i Darija	
2012	Ivana Škrabalo	Cannibal Vegetarian	Ljudožder vegetarijanac	
2013	Mario Ivezić (3)	A Stranger	Obrana i zaštita	
2014	Damir Gabelica	Number 55	Broj 55	
2015	Ivan Veljača	These Are the Rules	Takva su pravila	
2016	Željka Burić	All the Best	Sve najbolje	
2017	Petra Poslek (shared)	Goran	Goran	
2017	Iva Rodić (shared)	Goran	Goran	
2018	Ivana Škrabalo (2)	The Eighth Commissioner	Osmi povjerenik	
2019	Jana Piacun	The Last Serb in Croatia	Posljednji Srbin u Hrvatskoj	
2020	Jana Plećaš	Mare	Mare	

== Footnotes ==
A. Although the festival was opened on 26 July 1991 and a press screening of Zrinko Ogresta's film Fragments: Chronicle of a Vanishing was held, the festival board presided by Antun Vrdoljak decided to cancel the festival, as a sign of protest against violence related to the Ten-Day War in Slovenia and the initial stages of the Croatian War of Independence. Nine films were supposed to be screened in the competition program.
B.: The awards ceremony was cancelled in 1994 as only one Croatian feature film was made in the preceding 12 months (Bogdan Žižić's The Price of Life). The festival was held in spite of this, but the usual competition program was replaced by screenings of the classic works of the Zagreb School of Animated Film and documentaries, while the main program featured premieres of six American movies.

== See also ==
- Cinema of Yugoslavia
- Cinema of Croatia
