= Damir Kudin =

Croatian cinematographer

- Citizenship: Croatia
- Occupation: Cinematographer

Damir Kudin is a Croatian cinematographer. His works include Tiny Tim: King for a Day, Ibiza, etc. He is a frequent collaborator with Nevio Marasović, they made together The Show Must Go On, Vis-à-Vis, Comic Sans, and Goran. For Comic Sans, Kudin was awarded by the Croatian Cinematographers Society at the 66th Pula Film Festival.

In 2023, he worked with Nevio Marasović on Good Times, Bad Times.
