= Cowboys (2013 film) =

2013 film

- Film poster
- Croatian: Kauboji
- Directed by: Tomislav Mršić
- Written by: Tomislav Mršić
- Based on: Kauboji play by Saša Anočić
- Produced by: Suzana Pandek
- Starring: Saša Anočić; Živko Anočić; Rakan Rushaidat
- Cinematography: Predrag Dubravcic
- Edited by: Hrvoje Mrsic
- Release dates: 26 July 2013 (Pula); 10 October 2013 (Croatia)
- Running time: 107 minutes
- Country: Croatia
- Language: Croatian

Cowboys (Croatian: Kauboji) is a 2013 Croatian comedy film directed by Tomislav Mršić and based upon Saša Anočić's play, Kauboji. It was selected as the Croatian entry for the Best Foreign Language Film at the 87th Academy Awards, but was not nominated.

== Cast ==
- Saša Anočić as Saša Anloković
- Živko Anočić as Domagoj Strbac
- Matija Antolić as Juraj Krmpotić
- Hrvoje Barišić as Javor Borovec
- Ana Begić as Saša's sister
- Nikša Butijer as post office clerk
- Nina Erak-Svrtan as Javor's mother
- Kruno Klobučar as Bruno Marić
- Ivana Rushaidat as Marica Krmpotić
- Rakan Rushaidat as Miodrag P. Osmanović
- Radovan Ruždjak as Ivan Horvat

== See also ==
- List of submissions to the 87th Academy Awards for Best Foreign Language Film
- List of Croatian submissions for the Academy Award for Best Foreign Language Film
