= I Have to Sleep, My Angel =

2007 film

- Directed by: Dejan Aćimović
- Starring: Karlo Barbarić; Nataša Dorčić
- Release date: 19 July 2007
- Running time: 1h 40min
- Country: Croatia
- Language: Croatian

I Have to Sleep, My Angel (Croatian: Moram spavat' anđele) is a 2007 Croatian drama film directed by Dejan Aćimović.

== Cast ==
- Karlo Barbarić - Goran
- Nataša Dorčić - Majka
- Franjo Dijak - Inspektor
- Goran Grgić - Otac
- Vera Zima - Baka
- Miralem Zubčević - Djed
- Olga Pakalović - Mirjana
- Ksenija Marinković - Biljana
- Doris Šarić-Kukuljica - Safija
- Zrinka Radić - Lucija
- Gordana Gadžić - Marija
