= Stjepan Perić =

Croatian actor

- Born: 1 March 1983 (age 42); Zagreb, SR Croatia, Yugoslavia
- Citizenship: Croatian
- Education: Central School of Speech and Drama Academy of Dramatic Art in Zagreb
- Occupation: Actor
- Years active: 2006–present
- Spouse: Jelena Jovanova Perić (m. 2015)
- Children: 2

Stjepan Perić (Croatian pronunciation: [stjêpaːn pɛːritɕ]; born 1 March 1983) is a Croatian actor.

== Biography ==
After finishing high school, Perić studied law at the University of Zagreb. In 2003, he quit law to pursue a career as an actor.

In 2003, he enrolled in the Academy of Dramatic Art at the University of Zagreb, graduating in 2008.

In 2009, with director Nevio Marasović he co-wrote and starred in the pilot for the TV series The Instructor, which later became the first Croatian mockumentary TV series.

In 2011, he earned a Master of Fine Arts degree in film acting at the Central School of Speech and Drama in London.

On stage, he has starred in productions of the National Theatre in Zagreb, the National Theatre in Rijeka, the National Theatre in Varaždin, the Trešnja Theatre, the KULT Theatre and the Gavella Drama Theatre.

Since 2010 he decided to do only screen-acting and has appeared in over forty titles since.

He won the Best Leading Actor award at Mostar Film Festival for his role in Ministry of Love in 2016. In 2023 he won the Best Actor award at International Filmmaker Festival of New York for his role in Po Tamburi.

He provided the voice of President Arnold Schwarzenegger in the Croatian dub of The Simpsons Movie (2007).

He is married to Jelena Jovanova and they have two children.

== Selected filmography ==
=== Film ===
Year	Title	Role	Notes
2006	True Miracle	Gost	
2010	The Show Must Go On	Jan	
2012	Zagreb Stories 2	Mislav	
2013	The Priest's Children	Policajac Vlado	
2013	Kratki spojevi	Frane	
2015	Shooting Stars	Mišo	
2016	Ministry of Love	Krešo	
2021	Po Tamburi	Caruga	
2023	Bosnian pot		

=== Television ===
Year	Title	Role	Notes
2006	Balkan Inc.	Diler	6 episodes
2009–2010	Najbolje godine	Filip	40 episodes
2010	Instruktor	Instruktor	12 episodes
2012	Ruža vjetrova	Dr. Nikola Križman	35 episodes
2013	Stella	Orsat Bošković	14 episodes
2013–2014	Tajne	Filip Petrić	140 episodes
2014–2015	Kud puklo da puklo	Ljubo Žulj	171 episodes
2015–2019	Crno-bijeli svijet	Mio Vesović	3 episodes
2019	Na granici	Dinko Duda	25 episodes
2019–2020	Drugo ime ljubavi	Bruno Bošnjak	175 episodes
2020–2021	Dar mar	Priest Srećko Zlonoga	53 episodes
2024	Kumovi	Vice Vuletić	80 episodes

== Stage ==
- They Shoot Horses, Don't They? as Robert Syverten, Croatian National Theatre (2008)
- Dundo Maroje as Maro Marojev, Croatian National Theatre (2008)
- Elton John's Sunglasses as Shaun, Croatian National Theatre (2008)
- Mourning Becomes Electra as Orin Mannon, Croatian National Theatre (2008)
- Sorrows of Young Werther as Werther, KULT (2007)
- No One's Son as Patient 002, Croatian National Theatre (2006)
- Cinderella as Storyteller, Tresnja (2006)
