= I Love You (2005 Croatian film) =

- Croatian: Volim te
- Directed by: Dalibor Matanić
- Written by: Dalibor Matanić
- Produced by: Mario Orešković
- Starring: Krešimir Mikić
- Cinematography: Branko Linta
- Edited by: Tomislav Pavlic
- Production company: Croatian Radiotelevision
- Release date: 18 December 2005 (Croatia)
- Running time: 83 minutes
- Country: Croatia
- Language: Croatian

I Love You (Croatian: Volim te) is a 2005 Croatian drama film directed and written by Dalibor Matanić.

== Plot ==
Krešo is a successful young copywriter who works for a marketing company in Zagreb. He largely ignores his girlfriend Ana, preferring to spend time with his high school friends in rounds of alcohol, drugs and sex.

When one day Krešo causes a death of a woman while driving under the influence, and gets infected with HIV from a subsequent blood transfusion, his life is turned upside down. He is left by his girlfriend, fired from his job, and gradually abandoned by his friends until he meets a good-natured waitress.

== Cast ==
- Krešimir Mikić – Krešo
- Ivana Roščić – Waitress
- Ivana Krizmanić – Ana
- Zrinka Cvitešić – Squash girl
- Nataša Janjić – Nataša
- Bojan Navojec – Žac
- Leon Lučev – Mario
- Angelo Jurkas – Robi
- Ana Stunić – Escort girl
- Božidar Orešković – Krešo's father
- Biserka Ipša – Krešo's mother

== Reception ==
In a favorable 2007 review in The New York Times, Jeannette Catsoulis describes the film as a "bleak drama [which] is an unusually perceptive scrutiny of absence and emptiness", emphasized further by gray and pastel tones of Branko Linta's cinematography.

Croatian Film Association's database of Croatian films describes I Love You as a film with a modern style, dealing with an interesting and somewhat intriguing topic, but notes its one-dimensionality and predictability, arguing that characterization and depth were sacrificed in favor of the film's visual style.

Ronnie Scheib from Variety called the film uneven, with perfect tech credits, music, ambience and visuals, good delivery of leading actors, but generally unconvincing plot.
