= Marinko Prga =

Croatian actor

- Born: 1 January 1971 (age 55); Split, SFR Yugoslavia
- Occupation: Actor
- Years active: 1995–present

Marinko Prga (born 1 January 1971) is a Croatian actor. He has appeared in more than fifty films since 1995.

== Selected filmography ==
Year	Title	Role	Notes
1997	Lapitch the Little Shoemaker		voice
2001	No Man's Land		
2002	24 Hours		
2003	Witnesses		
2003	Kiss of Life		
2004	A Wonderful Night in Split		
2005	First Class Thieves		
2007	The Living and the Dead		
2010	72 Days		
2013	The Priest's Children		
2026	The Last Roman God		
