= Comic Sans (film) =

2018 Croatian comedy-drama film

- Film poster
- Directed by: Nevio Marasović
- Written by: Nevio Marasović; Rakan Rushaidat; Janko Popović Volarić
- Produced by: Ankica Jurić Tilić; Hrvoje Pervan; Ira Cecić
- Starring: Janko Popović Volarić; Zlatko Burić
- Cinematography: Damir Kudin
- Edited by: Tomislav Pavlic
- Release dates: March 2, 2018 (FEST); March 7, 2018 (Croatia)
- Running time: 103 minutes
- Country: Croatia
- Languages: Croatian, English

Comic Sans is a 2018 Croatian comedy-drama film directed by Nevio Marasović.

The film premiered at the 46th FEST International Film Festival in Belgrade.

Comic Sans is the fourth film project by Nevio Marasović shot on Vis and the first Croatian feature to be shot on the remote Croatian island of Jabuka.

== Plot ==
A successful graphic designer Alan Despot (Janko Popović Volarić), after trying in vain to renew a broken relationship with his girlfriend (Nataša Janjić) experiences an emotional breakdown. Persuaded by his concerned mother (Alma Prica) he goes to the island of Vis with his estranged and eccentric father (Zlatko Burić) to arrange a funeral for their deceased aunt. There he meets another ex-girlfriend (Inti Šraj) and her fiancé (Miha Rodman). New situations and circumstances help Alan to view his own life from a new perspective.

== Cast ==
- Janko Popović Volarić as Alan
- Zlatko Burić as Bruno
- Nataša Janjić as Marina
- Miloš Timotijević as Lukas
- Alma Prica as Vesna
- Inti Šraj as Barbara
- Jette Ostan Vejrup as Anne
- Sara Hjort Ditlevsen as Sofie
- Miha Rodman as Peter
- Tanja Ribič as Urška
- Damir Poljičak as Pape

== Awards ==
The film was screened at numerous world film festivals, among its awards there are:

- Alexandria International Film Festival 2018, Alexandria, Egypt – official competition – award for best actor (Janko Popović Volarić);
- Actor's festival in Mojkovac 2018, Mojkovac, Montenegro – award for the best male role (Janko Popović Volarić);
- Sombor Film Festival 2018, Sombor, Serbia – competition program – best film award;
- 32nd Montenegro Film Festival 2018, Herceg Novi, Montenegro – FEDEORA award of the Federation of Film Critics of Europe and the Mediterranean;
- Pula Film Festival 2018, Pula, Croatia – Golden Arena for Best Director (Nevio Marasović), Golden Arena for Best Actor (Janko Popović Volarić), Golden Arena for Best Supporting Actress (Nataša Janjić), Golden Arena for Editing (Tomislav Pavlic), Golden Arena for Sound Design (Julij Zornik), Golden Gate of Pula Audience Award;
- Ceau, Cinema! 2018, Timișoara and Gottlob, Romania – competition program – Audience Award;
- Film for A!, Private art gymnasium award for best film 2018, Zagreb, Croatia;
- FEST International Film Festival 2018, Belgrade, Serbia, main competition program, Jury Award for the best film in the region given by film critics 'Nebojša Đukelić'.

== Other festival screenings ==
- Guwahati International Film Festival 2018, Guwahati, India - programme World Cinema
- Oaxaca FilmFest 2018, Oaxaca, Mexico - official competition
- Raindance Film Festival 2018, London, United Kingdom - non-competitive programme Narratives
- Manaki Brothers Film Festival 2018, Skopje, Macedonia - programme "European Cinema Perspectives"
- LIFFE - Leskovac International Film Festival 2018, Leskovac, Serbia
- Betina Film Festival 2018, Betina, Croatia
- Dalmatia Film Festival 2018, towns of Dalmatia, Croatia
- Film Meetings in Niš 2018, Niš, Serbia
- 19th Mediteran Film Festival 2018, Široki Brijeg, Bosnia and Herzegovina - non-competitive programme
- Prishtina International Film Festival 2018, Priština, Kosovo - competition programme "Honey and Blood"
- International Film Festival Tonneins 2018, Tonneins, France - official selection
- Five Days of Zagreb in Sarajevo 2018, Sarajevo, Bosnia and Herzegovina
- Philadelphia Independent Film Festival 2018, Philadelphia, United States
- South East European Film Festival 2018, Los Angeles, USA - program "Feature Program"
- Let's CEE Film Festival 2018, Vienna, Austria - program Artis International
- European Union Film Festival 2020, Ottawa, Canada
