= Amar Bukvić =

Croatian film and television actor

- Born: 10 June 1981 (age 45); Zagreb, SR Croatia, SFR Yugoslavia
- Occupations: Actor; producer
- Years active: 2003–present
- Spouse: Alma Vukičević (m. 2014)
- Children: 2

Amar Bukvić (born June 10, 1981) is a Croatian actor of Bosniak descent. He is famous for his work in theatre, television and film. He is a member of Gdk Gavella theatre in Zagreb, Croatia. He has received numerous acting awards, including the Croatian theatre award twice.

== Filmography ==
TV
Year	Title	Role	Notes
2005	Zabranjena ljubav	Roni	Guest star
2005	Bumerang	Zijo	Guest star
2007	Bitange i princeze	Vjeran	Guest star
2007	Operacija Kajman	Villain	Guest star
2007–2008	Ponos Ratkajevih	Vilko Orešković	Antagonist
2008	Zakon Ljubavi	Vojin	Guest star
2008–2009	Sve će biti dobro	Bruno Peleški	Supporting
2009	Moja tri zida	Amar	Main Cast
2010	Stipe u gostima	Cameraman	Guest star
2006–2011	Bibin svijet	Milivoj Babić	Main Cast
2009–2011	Najbolje godine	Tomo Hajduk	Co-Protagonist
2013	Počivali u miru	Visitor	Guest star
2013	Stipe u gostima	Bruno	Guest star
2013	Stella	Martin	Antagonist
2013–2014	Zora dubrovačka	Boris Pavela	Co-Protagonist
2015	Vatre ivanjske	Leon	Main antagonist
2015	Horvatovi	Filip Bukvić	Guest star
2016	Božićni ustanak	Charles	Guest star
2016–present	Prava žena	Aljoša Babić	Main cast

Film
Year	Title	Role	Notes
2003	Svjedoci	Prisoner	
2006	Pjevajte nešto ljubavno	Draško	
2010	The Show Must Go On	Albin	
2011	Blurs	Žac	
2013	Eyjafjallajökull	Police Officer in Ljubljana airport	
2022	The Weekend Away	Pavić	
2026	The Last Roman God	Diocletian	
