= Eagle (1990 film) =

1990 Croatian film directed by Zoran Tadić

- Croatian: Orao
- Directed by: Zoran Tadić
- Written by: Pavao Pavličić
- Based on: Umjetni orao by Pavao Pavličić
- Starring: Ivica Vidović; Božidar Orešković; Vlatko Dulić; Zdenko Jelčić; Ljiljana Blagojević; Gordana Gadžić; Iva Marjanović; Renata Jurković; Ksenija Pajić; Fabijan Šovagović
- Cinematography: Goran Trbuljak
- Edited by: Vladimir Klešćić
- Music by: Darko Rundek
- Production companies: Marjan Film; Color 2000
- Release date: 4 June 1990 (Yugoslavia)
- Running time: 92 minutes
- Country: Yugoslavia
- Language: Serbo-Croatian

Eagle (Croatian: Orao) is a 1990 Croatian film directed by Zoran Tadić. It is based on Umjetni orao, a novel by Pavao Pavličić.

== Plot summary ==
Radovan Orlak, known to his friends as Orao (Eagle), fell to his death off a high-rise building on his birthday. Upon hearing the news, four of his long-time friends—Milan, Dražen, Krešo and Vlado—realize how little they actually knew about him and begin to investigate in the hopes of uncovering what really happened. They assume their friend has committed suicide, and begin to exact revenge on people whom they deem responsible. After a while, they find out that Orao was seen with an unidentified man on the night of his death, and begin to suspect he was actually murdered.

== Cast ==
- Vlatko Dulić as Vlado
- Ivica Vidović as Krešo
- Zdenko Jelčić as Milan
- Božidar Orešković as Dražen
- Fabijan Šovagović as Kristofić
- Gordana Gadžić as Zlatka
- Ksenija Pajić as Branka
- Iva Marjanović as Jasna
- Ljiljana Bogojević as Zdravka
- Renata Ćurković as Marjana
- Otokar Levaj as the secretary
- Smiljka Bencet as the cleaning lady
- Boris Festini as the violinist

== Release and reception ==
Shortly after the film was completed, Marjan Film went bankrupt, which was followed by the outbreak of Yugoslav Wars. As a result, the film was never distributed theatrically.

While Croatian Film Association's database assessed Eagle as Tadić's weakest film to date, Croatian film critic Nenad Polimac listed it in his 2007 selection of "lost classics" of Croatian cinema.
