= Ministry of Love (film) =

- Directed by: Pavo Marinković
- Starring: Stjepan Perić; Dražen Kühn
- Release date: 10 July 2016 (PFF)
- Running time: 103 minutes
- Country: Croatia
- Language: Croatian
- Budget: €800,000

Ministry of Love (Croatian: Ministarstvo ljubavi) is a 2016 Croatian comedy film directed by Pavo Marinković.

== Cast ==
- Stjepan Perić – Kreso
- Dražen Kühn – Sikic
- Ecija Ojdanić – Dunja
- Olga Pakalović – Sandra
- Milan Štrljić – Slavko
- Ksenija Marinković – Brigadirka Rukavina
- Alma Prica – Ljerka
- Oleg Tomac – Janko
- Bojan Navojec – Ico
