= Kauboji =

- Music: Rakan Rushaidat, Matija Antolić
- Premiere: 6 March 2008; 18 years ago: Exit Theatre, Zagreb, Croatia
- Awards: See awards

Kauboji (English: Cowboys) is a comedy musical authored by Saša Anočić, with music by Rakan Rushaidat and Matija Antolić.

== Synopsis ==
The story follows eight people (described typically as losers) in an undefined setting who meet together in order to create a cowboy show, starting from an audition until the premiere. During this course of events, they develop their life stories, influencing each other and eventually becoming immersed in the development and begin viewing the show as a chance of a lifetime.

== History ==
The show premiered on March 6, 2008 at Exit Theatre, which was preceded by six months of preparations.

On 11 January 2020, it performed its 500th show.

== Crew ==
- Author and director: Saša Anočić
- Roles: Živko Anočić/Damir Klemenić, Matija Antolić, Hrvoje Barišić, Krunoslav Klabučar, Rakan Rushaidat, Radovan Ruždjak, Ivana Starčević
- Dramaturgy: Saša Anočić, Hana Veček
- Scenography: Margareta Lekić
- Costumes: Hana Letica
- Music: Rakan Rushaidat, Matija Antolić
- Lighting: Olivije Marečić

== Reception ==
The show achieved a cult status as a beloved theatre show on the Zagreb scene and is regarded as a popular and acclaimed show of Exit Theatre. It was sold out for 10 years.

Boris Horvat, in a column for Vijenac, stated that the young acting ensemble managed to "adapt very well to the destitute theatric ambiance", and described the show as an impressive effort showing great enthusiasm.

=== Awards ===
- Nagrada hrvatskog glumišta, 2008 (best show, best directing)
- Plaketa grada Zagreba (best show, best directing)
- Vjesnikova nagrada Dubravko Dujšin za kazališnu umjetnost, 2008 (best show)
- Marulićevi dani, 2009 (best show, best acting, best directing, best actor)
- Festival glumca, 2009 (best male actor, best young actor)
- Dani satire, 2008 (honorary award, best actor)
- Gavelline večeri, 2008 (honorary award)
- 25. Međunarodni kazališni susreti u Brčkom (best show, best male act)
- Teatar Fest, 2009, Banja Luka (best show)
- Outward, 2008 (best poster)
- Makarsko kulturno ljeto, 2016 (best show, best male act)
- 16. Međunarodni festival glumca u Nikšiću, 2019 (Grand Prix best show)

== Film adaptation ==
Due to its popularity, the show was eventually adapted into a movie during 2013, directed by Tomislav Mršić. However, the director entered a dispute with Saša Anočić over copyright, and the movie omitted the original show's credits.
