= The Lika Cinema =

- Film poster
- Croatian: Kino Lika
- Directed by: Dalibor Matanić
- Written by: Dalibor Matanic; Milan Živković
- Based on: Kino Lika by Damir Karakaš
- Produced by: Ankica Jurić-Tilić
- Starring: Krešimir Mikić
- Cinematography: Branko Linta
- Edited by: Tomislav Pavlić
- Release date: July 2008 (Pula Film Festival)
- Running time: 120 minutes

The Lika Cinema (Croatian: Kino Lika) is a Croatian drama film directed by Dalibor Matanić. It was released in 2008.

== Cast ==
- Krešimir Mikić as Mike
- Areta Ćurković as Olga
- Ivo Gregurević as Joso
- Danko Ljuština as Mike's father
- Jasna Žalica as Joso's wife
- Nada Gaćešić as Aunt
- Milan Pleština as Doctor
- Dara Vukić as Granny
- Marija Tadić as Jele
- Milivoj Beader as Iguman
- Damir Karakaš as Gliso
- Petar Tudja as Boy
- Trpimir Jurkić as Young Policeman
- Filip Radoš as Old Policeman
- Mirela Brekalo as Mike's mother
