= Just Between Us (film) =

- Croatian theatrical poster
- Directed by: Rajko Grlić
- Written by: Rajko Grlić; Ante Tomić
- Produced by: Igor Nola
- Starring: Miki Manojlović; Bojan Navojec; Nataša Dorčić; Daria Lorenci; Ksenija Marinković
- Cinematography: Slobodan Trninić
- Edited by: Andrija Zafranović
- Music by: Alfi Kabiljo; Alan Bjelinski
- Release date: 10 March 2010 (Croatia)
- Running time: 87 minutes
- Country: Croatia
- Language: Croatian

Just Between Us (Croatian: Neka ostane među nama) is a 2010 Croatian drama film directed by Rajko Grlić starring Miki Manojlović, Bojan Navojec, Nataša Dorčić, Daria Lorenci and Ksenija Marinković. The film is a co-production involving Croatia's Mainframe Production, Serbia's Yodi Movie Craftsman and Slovenia's Studio Maj and was additionally financed by the Croatian Radiotelevision and Eurimages.

== Plot ==
The film, set in Zagreb, centers around two middle-aged middle class brothers, Nikola and Braco (played by Manojlović and Navojec) and the parallel lives they lead amid a web of complex relationships with their wives, mistresses and children. The film has been described by critics as an examination of "loneliness, adultery and urban life", and has been praised for its authentic depiction of contemporary Zagreb.

== Cast ==
- Miki Manojlović - Nikola
- Bojan Navojec - Braco
- Ksenija Marinković - Marta
- Daria Lorenci - Anamarija
- Nataša Dorčić - Latica
- Nina Ivanišin - Davorka
- Buga Šimić - Maja
- Živko Anočić - Nino
- Krešimir Mikić - Jura

== Awards ==
The film was nominated for the Crystal Globe at the 45th Karlovy Vary International Film Festival, where Rajko Grlić won the Best Director award, and where it also won the Label Europa Cinemas award. It also went on to win seven Golden Arena awards at the 2010 Pula Film Festival, the Croatian national film awards, including Best Film, Best Director (Rajko Grlić), Best Supporting Actress (Ksenija Marinković), Best Cinematography (Slobodan Trninić), Best Production Design (Ivo Hušnjak), Best Film Music (Alfi Kabiljo and Alan Bjelinski) and Best Sound Editing (Srđan Kurpjel).
