= Meša Selimović Award =

Annual Bosnian literary award

- Awarded for: for the best novel published in the previous year from Bosnia and Herzegovina, Croatia, Montenegro and Serbia
- Location: Tuzla
- Country: Bosnia and Herzegovina
- Presented by: Cum grano salis
- First award: 2002

The Meša Selimović Award is a Bosnian literary award for the best novel published in the previous year from Bosnia and Herzegovina, Croatia, Montenegro and Serbia. It has been awarded in Tuzla since 2002. It is named in honor of the Bosnian writer Meša Selimović.

The award was founded by the former Municipality of Tuzla in 2001 on the initiative of Jasmin Imamović, and is awarded within the framework of literary meetings "Cum grano salis" in Tuzla. The prize consists of the sculpture Mastionica i pero, which is the work of academic sculptor Pera Jelisić, and a cash prize.

It is the most important literary award in Southeast Europe.

== Winners ==
Meša Selimović Award winners
Year	Author	Title	Country	Ref.
2002	Marinko Koščec	"Netko drugi"	Croatia	
2003	Irfan Horozović	"Shakespeare u Dar es Salaamu"	Bosnia and Herzegovina	
2004	Ivica Đikić	"Cirkus Columbia"	Croatia	
2005	Ognjen Spahić	"Hansenova djeca"	Montenegro	
2006	Sanja Domazet	"Ko plače"	Serbia	
2007	Miljenko Jergović	"Ruta Tannenbaum"	Croatia	
2008	Mirko Kovač	"Grad u zrcalu"	Croatia	
2009	Bekim Sejranović	"Nigdje, niotkuda"	Croatia	
2010	Mirjana Đurđević	"Kaja, Beograd i dobri Amerikanac"	Serbia	
2011	Ludwig Bauer	"Zavičaj, zaborav"	Croatia	
2012	Faruk Šehić	"Knjiga o Uni"	Bosnia and Herzegovina	
2013	Milorad Popović	"Karnera"	Montenegro	
2014	Ivan Lovrenović	"Nestali u stoljeću"	Bosnia and Herzegovina	
2015	Filip David	"Kuća sećanja i zaborava"	Serbia	
2016	Slobodan Šnajder	"Doba mjedi"	Croatia	
2017	Andrej Nikolaidis	"Mađarska rečenica"	Bosnia and Herzegovina/ Montenegro	
2018	Semezdin Mehmedinović	"Me’med, crvena bandana i pahuljica"	Bosnia and Herzegovina	
2019	Senka Marić	"Kintsugi tijela"	Bosnia and Herzegovina	
2020	Ivana Bodrožić	"Sinovi, kćeri"	Croatia	
2021	Damir Karakaš	"Okretište"	Croatia	
2022	Bora Ćosić	"Bergotova udovica"	Serbia	
2023	Kristian Novak	"Slučaj vlastite pogibelji"	Croatia	
2024	Jurica Pavičić	"Žigice"	Croatia	
2025	Almir Imširević	"Lavanda, petrolej "	Bosnia and Herzegovina	
