= Bosnian Pot (film) =

2023 film by Pavo Marinković

Bosnian pot
- Theatrical release poster
- Directed by: Pavo Marinković
- Written by: Pavo Marinković
- Produced by: Stanislav Babić; Slaven Knežović; Peter Roehsler
- Starring: Senad Bašić; Bruna Bebić; Andreas Kiendl; Birgit Stöger; Admir Glamočak; Zlatko Burić
- Cinematography: Peter Roehsler
- Edited by: Dubravko Slunjski
- Music by: Ted Regklis
- Production companies: Nanook Film Wien; Oktavijan; Telefilm
- Distributed by: Duplicato Media
- Release date: 13 August 2023; (Sarajevo Film Festival)
- Running time: 103 minutes
- Countries: Croatia: Bosnia and Herzegovina; Austria
- Languages: Bosnian; German

Bosnian pot (Bosnian: Bosanski lonac) is a 2023 comedy-drama film written and directed by Pavo Marinković. A co-production of Austria, Bosnia and Herzegovina and Croatia, the film was shot in Zagreb and Graz. The film stars Senad Bašić, Bruna Bebić, Andreas Kiendl, Birgit Stöger, Admir Glamočak and Zlatko Burić. Premiered on 13 August 2023 at the 29th Sarajevo Film Festival, the film received positive reviews.

== Cast ==
=== Main cast ===
- Senad Bašić as Faruk Šego
- Andreas Kiendl as Manni
- Birgit Stöger as Therese
- Bruna Bebić as Dragica
- Admir Glamočak as Mujica
- Zlatko Burić as Zdenek
- Igor Kovač as Radu
- Julia Franz Richter as Xandra
- Goran Grgić as Stjepo
- Dejan Aćimović as Boro
- Dražen Kühn as Ambasador
- Matija Prskalo as the Ambassador's Wife
- Aleksandar Petrović as Sigi
- Wolfram Berger as Father

=== Other cast ===
- Anđelko Petric as the Second miner
- Davor Svedružić as the Dirst miner
- Slaven Knezović as the Chief of the miners
- Ewald Pflefer as Technician
- Ismet Čolić as Marko
- Monika Klengel as secretary
- Rupert Lehofer as Buchsbaum
- Stjepan Perić as Imam
- Mirela Brekalo Popović as Waitress
- Ed. HausWirth as Artist
- Gudrun Maier as Artist
- Daria Lorenci Flatz as Mutapčička

== Release ==
The film had its premiere at the Sarajevo Film Festival on 13 August 2023.
