= All for Free =

- Theatrical release poster
- Directed by: Antonio Nuić
- Written by: Antonio Nuić
- Produced by: Boris Matić
- Starring: Rakan Rushaidat; Nataša Janjić; Emir Hadžihafizbegović; Franjo Dijak; Bojan Navojec; Miraj Grbić; Mirsad Tuka; Moamer Kasumović
- Cinematography: Mirsad Herović
- Edited by: Marin Juranić
- Music by: Siniša Krneta; Hrvoje Štefotić
- Release dates: July 2006 (Pula); 1 December 2006 (Serbia)
- Running time: 94 minutes
- Countries: Croatia; Bosnia and Herzegovina; Serbia
- Languages: Croatian, Serbian, Bosnian

All for Free (Bosnian: Sve džaba) is a 2006 Bosnian-Croatian-Serbian film directed by Antonio Nuić.

The film premiered at the 2006 Pula Film Festival (the Croatian national film awards festival), where it went on to win the Big Golden Arena for Best Film award, along with the Best Director (Antonio Nuić), Best Screenplay (Antonio Nuić) and Best Supporting Actress (Nataša Janjić) awards.
