= The Society of Jesus =

- Directed by: Silvije Petranović
- Written by: Silvije Petranović; Jirí Sotola
- Produced by: Maydi Petranović; Silvije Petranović
- Starring: Milan Pleština; Leona Paraminski; Ivica Vidović; Maša Petranović; Mustafa Nadarević; Matija Prskalo
- Cinematography: Mišo Orepić
- Edited by: Andrija Zafranović, Vanja Siruček
- Production companies: Maydi Film & Video, Croatian Radiotelevision
- Release dates: 17 July 2004 (PFF); 25 November 2004 (Croatia)
- Running time: 95 minutes
- Country: Croatia
- Language: Croatian

The Society of Jesus (Croatian: Družba Isusova) is a 2004 Croatian drama film directed by Silvije Petranović, starring Leona Paraminski and Milan Pleština. The screenplay, written by Petranović, is based on Jiří Šotola's 1969 novel of the same name.

== Cast ==
- Milan Pleština - Father Had
- Leona Paraminski - Countess Maria
- Ivica Vidović - Father Ivan
- Maša Petranović - Countess's Daughter
- Mustafa Nadarević - Castelan
- Matija Prskalo - Castelan's Wife
- Galliano Pahor - Provincial
- Darko Milas - Rector
- Livio Badurina - Archbishop
- Bojan Navojec - Bacvar
- Dejan Aćimović - Abot
- Leon Lučev - Vojnik
- Zoran Čubrilo - Admontor
- Vlatko Dulić - Seljak
- Krešimir Mikić - Zabavljac Sefard
