= Goran (film) =

- Directed by: Nevio Marasović
- Written by: Gjermund Gisvold
- Starring: Franjo Dijak; Nataša Janjić
- Release date: 2 August 2016 (FIFF)
- Running time: 90 minutes
- Country: Croatia
- Language: Croatian

Goran is a 2016 Croatian drama film directed by Nevio Marasović.

== Plot ==
Goran (Franjo Dijak) is a taxi driver that takes care of his blind wife Lina (Nataša Janjić). He and his friend Slavko (Goran Bogdan) decorate an old cabin in the woods. They make an outdoor sauna and make the inside comfy. Goran while driving taxi encounters Niko (Janko Popović Volarić), Lina's brother and Dragan (Filip Križan) arriving in town. Niko invites Goran, Lina and, Slavko to go bowling. They accept and, as Lina suggested Goran convinces Niko to join them for dinner in Niko and Lina's father's house, Luke (Milan Štrljić). At a family dinner, Goran's wife announces pregnancy. Her father is thrilled but Goran couldn't contain a worried face. Niko has a fight with his father because he doesn't support him being gay, and bringing Dragan as a boyfriend. Goran suspects his wife is cheating, especially when she claims to go on a business trip to Split for a few days on his birthday. He drives a taxi and ends up on a gas station where he sees his wife in Slavko's car. He takes her back to his car and confronts Slavko, unintentionally pushing him in front of a rushing truck that lost control and explodes. His wife then tells him that they planned a surprise for his birthday and they head to the cabin, where all his friends are waiting. He is confused and out of his mind. He goes out for air and Niko follows him giving him present and congratulating him on the baby. Goran confesses that he is not fertile. Party goes on a different level with drugs and alcohol, they all fall asleep. The next morning Goran finds a tape in their living room and plays it. It was some cartoon at the beginning, but after it was his wife and Borko (Bojan Navojec), Slavko's brother in bed. Borko enters and starts to apologize, but Goran starts laughing and crying hysterically. Luke arrives in the cabin and finds Borko beating up Goran for killing his brother while sex tape is running in the background, Lina sleeping in her bed and Niko and Dragan having sex in the sauna. He then locks Dragan in a hot burning sauna while fighting with Niko, causing Dragan's death, and Niko suffocating and killing his father. Niko enters the cabin, finding Borko on the floor dying and Goran smoking cigarettes beaten up. Lina wakes up and has no clue what was going on. The movie ends with the three going to Opatija as they used to before.

== Cast ==
- Franjo Dijak — Goran
- Nataša Janjić — Lina
- Janko Popović Volarić — Niko
- Filip Križan — Dragan
- Milan Štrljić — Luke
- Bojan Navojec — Borko
- Goran Bogdan — Slavko

== Awards ==
The film received two Golden Arena awards. Alen and Nenad Sinkauz received the Best Music award. Petra Poslek and Iva Rodić received the Best Scenography award.
