= The Last Roman God =

- Release poster
- Croatian: Posljednji rimski bog
- Directed by: Božidar Domagoj Burić
- Written by: Božidar Domagoj Burić
- Produced by: Božidar Domagoj Burić; Marija Kosor; Marko Kaić; Miro Mioč
- Starring: Amar Bukvić; Nataša Janjić; Slavko Sobin; Marko Cindrić; Krešimir Mikić; Dragan Despot
- Cinematography: Branko Cahun
- Edited by: Dubravko Prugovečki
- Music by: Božidar Domagoj Burić
- Production company: Croatian Radiotelevision
- Distributed by: Duplicato Media
- Release dates: October 26, 2026 (Branimir centar); October 29, 2026 (Croatia)
- Running time: 135 minutes
- Country: Croatia
- Language: Latin
- Budget: €10.5 million
- Box office: $201,516

The Last Roman God (Croatian: Posljednji rimski bog) is a 2026 Croatian historical drama film directed and written by Božidar Domagoj Burić. Produced by Croatian Radiotelevision (HRT), the film follows the life and reign of the Roman emperor Diocletian (Amar Bukvić). The film also stars Nataša Janjić, Slavko Sobin, Marko Cindrić, Krešimir Mikić and Dragan Despot. It is one of the largest and most expensive productions in HRT's history. A series was filmed simultaneously and will be released after the film.

The Last Roman God premiered at the Branimir centar in Zagreb on October 26, 2026, and was theatrically released in Croatia by Duplicato Media on October 29.

== Cast ==
- Amar Bukvić as Diocletian
- Nataša Janjić Medančić as Prisca, Diocletian's wife
- Slavko Sobin as Maximian, Diocletian's co-emperor
- Marko Cindrić as Carinus, Roman emperor
- Krešimir Mikić as Aper
- Dragan Despot as senator Proculus
- Roman Šušković Stipanović as Titus Claudius Aurelius Aristobulus
- Marinko Prga as Primus
- Anja Šovagović Despot as Dryad
- Jerko Marčić as Cassius Dio
- Jasna Burić as Arminia
- Nikola Baće as Sixtus
- Franjo Kuhar as Saint Domnius
- Robert Kurbaša as Paulanius
- Aria Dunda as Galeria Valeria, Diocletian's daughter Leon Drkić as Josipus Brosius Titus, Diocletians friend
