= Ivona Juka =

Croatian and Montenegrin film director

Ivona Juka is a Croatian and Montenegrin film director. She is the author of award-winning short films Garbage and Editing, which were selected in Official competition of US festivals. She was selected by European Film Academy as one of 5 European students to make short films for awards ceremonies in Berlin, and to participate at the EFA conference Cinema of Tomorrow in Warsaw as one of the most promising directors in Europe.

Her previous short, View from a well, was awarded Best Film at American International Film Festival where Juka was awarded Best Director.

She is the screenwriter and director of the full-length creative documentary Facing the Day, Croatia's most awarded documentary. It was awarded best documentary at goEast film festival in Wiesbaden, DokMa film festival, Sarajevo Film Festival, and by Croatian Film Critics. The film won the Grand Prix at Croatian Film Days. The film had successful distributions in Croatia, Bosnia and Hercegovina and Macedonia.

You Carry Me is Juka's debut feature fiction film. The film premiered at the Karlovy Vary International Film Festival in 2015. After Karlovy Vary, it won 6 awards (Pula Film Festival - 4 awards; Montenegro Film Festival - award for the Best Director; Zadar Film Festival - Grand Prix). Juka was invited to other film festivals, such as International Film Festival of India – Goa (November 2015); FEST – Belgrade International Film Festival (February 2016); and, Munich International Film Festival (June 2016).

Ivona Juka is a member of the European Film Academy.

== Filmography ==
- Beautiful Evening, Beautiful Day, feature fiction film, 2024, 4film, Quiet Revolution Pictures, ORKA Production Studio, Caretta Films, Depo Production, Tastemaker Studios
- You Carry Me, feature fiction film, 2015, Galileo Production, 4film, Vertigo
- View from a Well („Pogled iz bunara“), short fiction film, 4 Film Ltd
- Facing the Day («Što sa sobom preko dana»), feature – length documentary, 72 min, 2006, 4 Film Ltd.
- EDITING, short film, 3 min, 2006
- BEHIND THE DOOR, short film, 2:13 min, 2007
- Welcome Home, Brother! («Dobrodošao kuči, brate!») documentary, 28min, 2005, Academy of Dramatic Arts - ADU
- Blue Pony Bicycle («Plavi pony»), documentary, 23 min, 2005, Academy of Dramatic Arts - ADU
- Nothing Else(«Ništa više»), short film, 12 min, 2004, Academy of Dramatic Arts - ADU
- Garbage («Smeće»), short film, 5 min, 2003, Academy of Dramatic Arts - ADU
