= Dubrovnik Twilight =

Dubrovnik Twilight (Dubrovački suton) is a Croatian film directed by Željko Senečić. It was released in 1999.
