= The One Who Will Stay Unnoticed =

- Directed by: Zvonimir Jurić
- Produced by: Boris T. Matić; Hrvoje Osvadić
- Starring: Nataša Dangubić
- Edited by: Dubravka Turić
- Release date: 2003
- Running time: 92 minutes
- Country: Croatia
- Language: Croatian

The One Who Will Stay Unnoticed (Croatian: Onaj koji će ostati neprimijećen) is a Croatian drama film directed by Zvonimir Jurić. It was released in 2003.

== Cast ==
- Nataša Dangubić
- Asja Jovanović - (as Asja Potočnjak)
- Daria Lorenci
- Krešimir Mikić - Kreso
- Bojan Navojec
- Rakan Rushaidat
