= The Priest's Children =

- Svećenikova djeca
- Directed by: Vinko Brešan
- Written by: Mate Matišić
- Produced by: Ivan Maloča
- Starring: Krešimir Mikić; Nikša Butijer; Marija Škaričić; Dražen Kühn; Jadranka Đokić; Marinko Prga; Stojan Matavulj
- Music by: Mate Matišić
- Production companies: Interfilm; Zillion film
- Distributed by: Continental Film
- Release date: 3 January 2013
- Running time: 92 minutes
- Countries: Croatia; Serbia; Montenegro
- Language: Croatian
- Budget: 10,000,000 kn

The Priest's Children (Croatian: Svećenikova djeca) is a 2013 Croatian comedy film directed by Vinko Brešan.

== Plot ==
Don Fabijan (Krešimir Mikić) is a young priest who comes to serve on an unnamed small island in the Adriatic. In order to help increase birth rate on the island, he decides to pierce condoms before they are sold. He therefore teams up with the newsagent Petar (Nikša Butijer) and the pharmacist Marin (Dražen Kühn).

After they abolish all forms of birth control on the entire island, the consequences become more and more complicated.

== Cast ==
- Krešimir Mikić as Don Fabijan
- Nikša Butijer as Petar
- Marija Škaričić as Marija
- Dražen Kühn as Marin
- Jadranka Đokić as Ana
- Goran Bogdan as Jure
- Stjepan Perić as Police officer Vlado
- Ivan Brkić as Luka
- Marinko Prga as Teacher Vinko
- Stojan Matavulj as Mayor

== Release and reception ==
The film was seen by 33,759 viewers during its opening weekend, which is the best opening of a Croatian film since the country's independence in 1991.
