= Areta Ćurković =

Croatian actress (born 1973)

- Born: 6 March 1973 (age 53); Đakovo, Yugoslavia
- Occupation: Actress
- Years active: 2008-present

Areta Ćurković (born 6 March 1973) is a Croatian actress. She won the 2014 Golden Arena for Best Actress for her performance as Ani in Happy Endings.

== Selected filmography ==
Year	Title	Role	Notes
2008	The Lika Cinema	Olga	
2014	Happy Endings	Ani	
2019	The Diary of Diana B.	Dragica Habazin	
