= Sex, Drink and Bloodshed =

- Film poster
- Seks, piće i krvoproliće
- Directed by: Zvonimir Jurić; Boris T. Matić; Antonio Nuić
- Written by: Zvonimir Jurić; Boris T. Matić; Antonio Nuić
- Produced by: Boris T. Matić; Hrvoje Osvadić
- Starring: Franjo Dijak; Bogdan Diklić; Daria Lorenci; Leon Lučev; Ksenija Marinković; Krešimir Mikić; Bojan Navojec; Leona Paraminski; Rakan Rushaidat
- Cinematography: Vjeran Hrpka
- Edited by: Marin Juranić; Veljko Segarić
- Release date: 25 November 2004
- Running time: 75 minutes
- Country: Croatia
- Language: Croatian

Sex, Drink and Bloodshed (Croatian: Seks, piće i krvoproliće) is a 2004 Croatian omnibus action film. The film depicts violence among football fans in Croatia on an Eternal Derby, a match between the country's two most popular football teams, Dinamo and Hajduk. It is divided into three stories: "Seks", "Piće" and "Krvoproliće" ("Sex", "Drink" and "Bloodshed" in English), directed by Boris T. Matić, Zvonimir Jurić and Antonio Nuić, respectively.

== Cast ==
- Franjo Dijak as Njonjo (segment "Krvoproliće")
- Bogdan Diklić as Komšija (segment "Seks")
- Matko Fabeković as Dario (segment "Seks")
- Admir Glamočak as Sejo (segment "Seks")
- Hrvoje Kečkeš as Žac
- Daria Lorenci as Policewoman (segment "Piće")
- Leon Lučev as Roko Vitaljić (segment "Piće")
- Ksenija Marinković as Valerija (segment "Seks")
- Krešimir Mikić as Zlatko Šnur
- Bojan Navojec as Mario (segment "Krvoproliće")
- Leona Paraminski as Martina (segment "Krvoproliće")
- Kristijan Potočki as Bad Blue Boy (the nickname for a supporter of Dinamo)
- Rakan Rushaidat as Goc (segment "Krvoproliće")
- Dražen Sivak as Policeman (segment "Piće")

== Critical reception ==
Critics gave mostly favorable reviews of Sex, Drink and Bloodshed. Croatican film critic Dean Šoša, writing for Nacional, rated the film 4 out of 5. He said the film is "not without faults", but that it is a "very decent and suggestive work of art", calling it the "most interesting product of Croatian cinematography since Mirta Learns Statistics and See You."
