= Veljko Despotović =

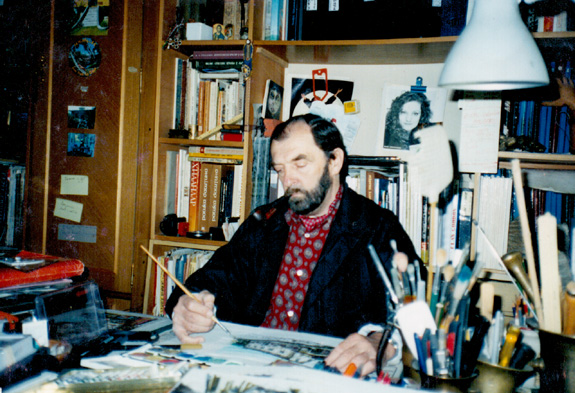
- Born: 1 October 1931; Zagreb, SFR Yugoslavia (present-day Croatia)
- Died: 6 April 2013 (aged 81)
- Occupation: Production designer
- Years active: 1964–present

Veljko Despotović (1 October 1931 – 6 April 2013) was a Serbian film and television production designer.

== Biography ==
In 1958 he graduated from the University of Belgrade Faculty of Architecture, after which he continued with designing theatre, film and television sets. Between 1950 and 1962 he was working as an assistant in the art department and as an architect in theatre, film and television. Since 1962 he works as independent Serbian and foreign film set designer. He has done over 150 domestic and foreign movies and co-productions.

Despotović won two Golden Arena for Best Production Design awards at the 1979 and 1984 editions of the Pula Film Festival, the Yugoslav national film awards. for his work on the films The Man to Kill (Čovjek koga treba ubiti, 1979; directed by Veljko Bulajić), Burning (Usijanje, 1979; directed by Boro Drašković), and Strangler vs. Strangler (Davitelj protiv davitelja, 1984; directed by Slobodan Šijan).

== Selected filmography ==
- I Even Met Happy Gypsies (1967)
- It Rains in My Village (1968)
- Who's That Singing Over There (1980)
- The Secret of Nikola Tesla (1980)
- Strangler vs. Strangler (1984)
- The Meeting Point (1989)
- Silent Gunpowder (1990)
- Tito and Me (1992)
- Tears for Sale (2008)
