= Željko Senečić =

- Born: 18 January 1933; Zagreb, Kingdom of Yugoslavia
- Died: 2 January 2018 (aged 84)
- Occupations: Production designer, film director
- Years active: 1960–2006

Željko Senečić (18 January 1933 – 2 January 2018) was a Croatian film and television production designer, film director and screenwriter.

Senečić studied painting at the Zagreb Academy of Fine Arts and scenography at the Zagreb Academy of Drama Arts. His career in filmmaking and production design began in the early 1960s. His most memorable films include the Palme d'Or and Academy Award-winning The Tin Drum (Die Blechtrommel, 1979; directed by Volker Schlöndorff and partially filmed in Zagreb, with Senečić credited as production co-designer) and classics of Croatian cinema such as Rondo (1966), One Song a Day Takes Mischief Away (Tko pjeva zlo ne misli, 1970).

Senečić won four Golden Arena for Best Production Design awards, making him one of the most decorated production designers in Croatian cinema.

He also co-wrote screenplays for films An Event (Događaj, 1969; directed by Vatroslav Mimica) and The House (Kuća, 1975; directed by Bogdan Žižić). Senečić also started directing short films in the late 1970s and then proceeded to make several feature films in the 1990s, such as Delusion (Zavaravanje, 1998) and Dubrovnik Twilight (Dubrovački suton, 1999).

== Selected filmography ==
As production designer

- Rondo (1966)
- One Song a Day Takes Mischief Away (1970)
- The Bloody Vultures of Alaska (1973)
- The Tin Drum (1979)
- The Glembays (1988)
- Charuga (1992)
