= You Carry Me (film) =

2015 film

- Film poster
- Directed by: Ivona Juka
- Written by: Ivona Juka
- Starring: Lana Barić
- Release dates: 3 May 2015 (Montenegro); 25 May 2015 (Croatia)
- Running time: 155 minutes
- Countries: Croatia; Slovenia; Serbia; Montenegro
- Language: Croatian

You Carry Me (Croatian: Ti mene nosiš) is a 2015 internationally co-produced drama film directed by Ivona Juka. The film was selected as the Montenegrin entry for the Best Foreign Language Film at the 88th Academy Awards but it was not nominated.

== Cast ==
- Lana Barić as Ives
- Vojislav Brajović as Ivan
- Nataša Janjić as Lidija
- Goran Hajduković as Vedran
- Helena Beljan as Dora
- Juraj Dabić as Jan
- Nataša Dorčić as Natasa

== See also ==
- List of submissions to the 88th Academy Awards for Best Foreign Language Film
- List of Montenegrin submissions for the Academy Award for Best Foreign Language Film
