= Metastases (film) =

2009 Croatian crime drama film

- Film poster
- Croatian: Metastaze
- Directed by: Branko Schmidt
- Written by: Ivo Balenović; Ognjen Sviličić
- Based on: Metastaze by Ivo Balenović
- Produced by: Stanislav Babić; Vanja Sutlić
- Starring: Rene Bitorajac; Franjo Dijak; Robert Ugrina; Rakan Rushaidat; Ivo Gregurević; Jadranka Đokić
- Cinematography: Dragan Ruljančić
- Production companies: HRT; Telefilm
- Release date: 30 March 2009 (Zagreb)
- Running time: 82 minutes
- Country: Croatia
- Language: Croatian

Metastases (Croatian: Metastaze) is a 2009 Croatian crime drama about some of the most common problems in post-war Croatia, including football hooliganism, drug addiction and alcoholism. It was directed by Branko Schmidt.

== Plot ==
Set in 1999, the film follows the lives of four unconventional friends from a Zagreb neighbourhood – Krpa, Filip, Kizo and Dejo. All of them are football fans and Dinamo Zagreb supporters.

Krpa is an antisocial football hooligan and Croatian War of Independence veteran who constantly abuses his wife. Throughout the film, he also insults and physically attacks several people who complain about his behaviour. In the final scene, he robs a betting shop and is involved in a foot chase with two police officers.

Filip is a drug addict who spent three years in a rehabilitation program in Spain. When he returns to Zagreb at the beginning of the film, his parents try to persuade him to find a job to prevent him from returning to his previous habits. The same day, he reunites with the remaining three members of the group at a neighbourhood bar.

Kizo is an ailurophiliac alcoholic and Croatian War of Independence veteran. He lives with his mother after the death of his father. One day, he goes to the bar to meet the rest of the group, so they can go to a football match together, only to learn that they had already left the bar without waiting for him to come. He goes back home, also visiting a supermarket to buy alcoholic beverages and cat food. He is then seen drinking and taking care of a litter of kittens in his backyard.

Dejo, half Serb, is the son of a former Yugoslav officer. He is also a drug addict and owes people money. His ethnicity constantly leads to insults from Krpa, who even persuades him to kiss the Altar of the Homeland.

Along with Filip, Dejo goes to Sarajevo to buy heroin. On their way back home, they visit Filip's aunt and uncle somewhere in Bosnia and Herzegovina. Filip's aunt and uncle say they would like to give his parents two bags of potatoes, but he says there is not enough space in Dejo's car to transport the bags, so they agree to transport them on their own in a few days. Filip hides the drug inside one of the bags, but it is eventually found by the border police when the bags are transported by a neighbour of Filip's aunt and uncle, Reuf, who did not know about the drugs.

== Cast ==
- Rene Bitorajac as Krpa
- Franjo Dijak as Filip
- Robert Ugrina as Kizo
- Rakan Rushaidat as Dejo
- Ivo Gregurević as Filip's father
- Ljiljana Bogojević as Filip's mother
- Daria Lorenci as Milica
- Jadranka Đokić as Krpa's wife
- Ksenija Marinković as Kizo's mother
- Predrag Vušović as Dejo's father
- Franjo Džimi Jurčec as Krpa's neighbour
- Vera Zima as Aunt Zora
- Emir Hadžihafizbegović as Reuf
- Ivan Brkić as Uncle Brane
- Elvedin Tiro as Mirza, the dealer
- Dražen Šivak as the doctor
- Ana Begić as the nurse
- Zoran Čubrilo as the porter
- Luka Dragić as the tennis player
- Tena Jeić Gajski as the tennis player
- Filip Šovagović as Zombi
- Kristijan Milić as Keks
- Robert Roklicer as Kina
- Kristijan Ugrina as Cic
- Ana Maras as the girl in the bookie #1
- Goran Nikić as Dugi
- Dora Lipovčan as Anita, the cashier
- Iva Babić as the other saleswoman
- Marko Marković as the store manager
- Grgo Prskalo as the police officer guard
- Jerko Marčić as the fat police officer
- Anastazija Jankovska as the girl in the bookie #2
- Melita Matijević as the waitress #1
- Masha Prodan Mati as the waitress #2

== Awards ==
The film won three Golden Arena awards at the 2009 Pula Film Festival:

- Big Golden Arena for Best Film
- Golden Arena for Best Actor (Rene Bitorajac as Krpa)
- Golden Arena for Best Makeup

== See also ==
- List of Croatian films
