= How the War Started on My Island =

1996 film directed by Vinko Brešan

- Directed by: Vinko Brešan
- Written by: Ivo Brešan; Vinko Brešan
- Produced by: Ante Škorput
- Starring: Vlatko Dulić; Ljubomir Kerekeš; Ivan Brkić; Predrag Vušović; Ivica Vidović; Božidar Orešković; Matija Prskalo
- Cinematography: Živko Zalar
- Edited by: Sandra Botica
- Music by: Mate Matišić
- Production company: Croatian Radiotelevision
- Release date: 7 August 1996; (Pula Film Festival)
- Running time: 97 minutes
- Country: Croatia
- Language: Croatian

How the War Started on My Island (Croatian: Kako je počeo rat na mom otoku) is a 1996 Croatian black comedy film directed by Vinko Brešan and starring Vlatko Dulić, Ljubomir Kerekeš, Ivan Brkić, Predrag Vušović, Ivica Vidović, Božidar Orešković and Matija Prskalo.

== Summary ==
The film is set in Croatia in mid-1991, after the Croatian Parliament had proclaimed the country's independence, seceding it from Yugoslavia. However, army garrisons around the country are still held by the Yugoslav People's Army (JNA), which does not acknowledge the parliament's decision. The JNA garrisons are largely manned by conscripts hailing from all over Yugoslavia who are serving their compulsory military service, and headed by senior officers who ignore Croatian demands that the JNA should leave Croatian territory and release Croats under their command. In this backdrop, the film begins with the arrival of art historian Blaž Gajski (played by Vlatko Dulić) to a small unnamed Croatian island with the intention of rescuing his son Zoran (Leon Lučev) who is serving at the local JNA barracks.

Gajski finds the situation on the island tense – the police have surrounded the barracks, locals are picketing the garrison, and the local commanders go in to negotiate a peaceful surrender of the compound with barracks commander major Aleksa Milosavljević (Ljubomir Kerekeš). However, Aleksa brushes them off, has the barracks rigged with explosives and threatens to blow everything up in case of any attempts to take the garrison by force. In response, islanders stage a non-stop festival in front of the compound, with rock bands and marching bands playing music, and with islanders reciting poems and giving speeches (including Aleksa's own wife) in the hope of convincing Aleksa to back down.

Meanwhile, the locals' commander has the garrison's power and phone lines cut. The locals then intercept an army radio transmission and, posing as army command, tell Aleksa not to do anything until a "colonel Kostadinović" arrives to give him detailed instructions, in order to buy more time to wear him down. After failing to get in the garrison or contact the commander, Gajski tries to get help from the locals in getting his son released, but everyone on the island seems completely engrossed by their own role in the events. He borrows a JNA officer uniform and enters the barracks, posing as colonel Kostadinović. There, he manages to retrieve his son and some soldiers, along with the full cache of explosives. As major Aleksa realizes he was deceived, he orders the remaining soldiers to open fire at the people gathered in front of the barracks, mortally wounding a poet reciting a poem.

== Background ==
In 1991, Vinko Brešan witnessed the protests in front of a Yugoslav People's Army garrison in Šibenik, observing some situations that he found very funny. At the time, Brešan had the idea of creating a documentary film about the events, but had no camera to record it. Finding that "experiencing these situations second-hand would deprive them of what made them funny", he came to realize that the only way to preserve the humor was to shoot a feature film instead. He made his impressions into an early version of the script, and presented it to his father Ivo Brešan, with whom he further developed the plot. The screenplay was finished and greenlighted for filming before Operation Storm, while the war was still ongoing.

How the War Started on My Island was shot in the winter of 1995, over 28 days, on locations near St. Anthony Channel and in Primošten. The garrison building featured in the film is the actual location of the 1991 protests.

== Reception ==
In spite of being filmed as a television production (the film was shot on 16 mm film, and later transferred to 35 mm film before being released to theaters), the film's blend of comedy and drama was well received by Croatian audiences. During its cinema run the film was seen by around 346,000 people in the country, which made it the most popular Croatian title of the 1990s, as well as one of the most popular Croatian films of all times. Its popularity has been ascribed to the film's return to "laughter and comedy, which were sorely absent in the cultural landscape of the first half of the 1990s, affected as it was with the high drama of profound changes".

The film won Grand Prize at the 1997 Cottbus Film Festival of Young East European Cinema and three Golden Arena Awards at the 1996 Pula Film Festival (Best Director, Best Actress in a Supporting Role and Best Costume).

In 1999, a poll of Croatian film fans found it to be one of the best Croatian films ever made.

== Bibliography ==
- Crnković, Gordana P. (2012). Post-Yugoslav Literature and Film: Fires, Foundations, Flourishes. London/New York: Continuum.
- Lučić, Krunoslav (2016). "The Representation of Minorities in Contemporary Croatian Film" (PDF). Umjetnost riječi. 60 (3–4). Zagreb: Croatian Philological Society: 231–260.
