= Boris T. Matić =

Croatian film producer (born 1966)

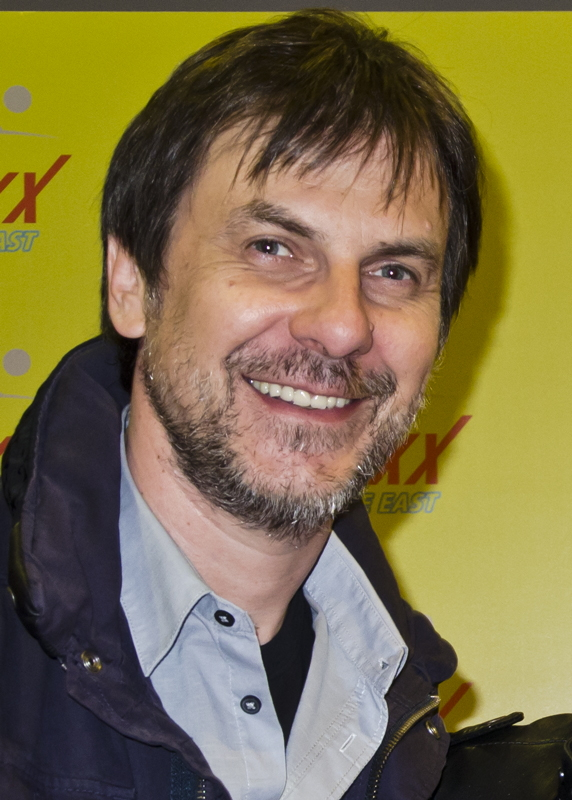
- Born: 1966; Doboj, Bosnia and Herzegovina
- Occupation: Film producer

Boris T. Matić (born 1966) is a Croatian film producer.

Matić is the founder and co-owner of Motovun Film Festival, and the founder and director of Zagreb Film Festival. His film production company, Propeler Film, was established in 2001.

Matić is a recipient of two Big Golden Arenas for Best Film, in 1997 (for Mondo Bobo) and 2006 (for All for Free).

== Filmography ==
=== Producer or co-producer ===
- Mondo Bobo (1997)
- The One Who Will Stay Unnoticed (2003)
- Sex, Drink and Bloodshed (2004)
- Gravehopping (2005)
- The Border Post (2006)
- All for Free (2006)
- Buick Riviera (2008)
- Donkey (2009)
- The Judgment (2014)
- Life Is a Trumpet (2015)
- Mali (2018)
- Father (2020)
- My Late Summer (2024)

== Sources ==
- "Boris T. Matić". propelerfilm.com. Archived from the original on 3 March 2016.
