= Predrag Vušović =

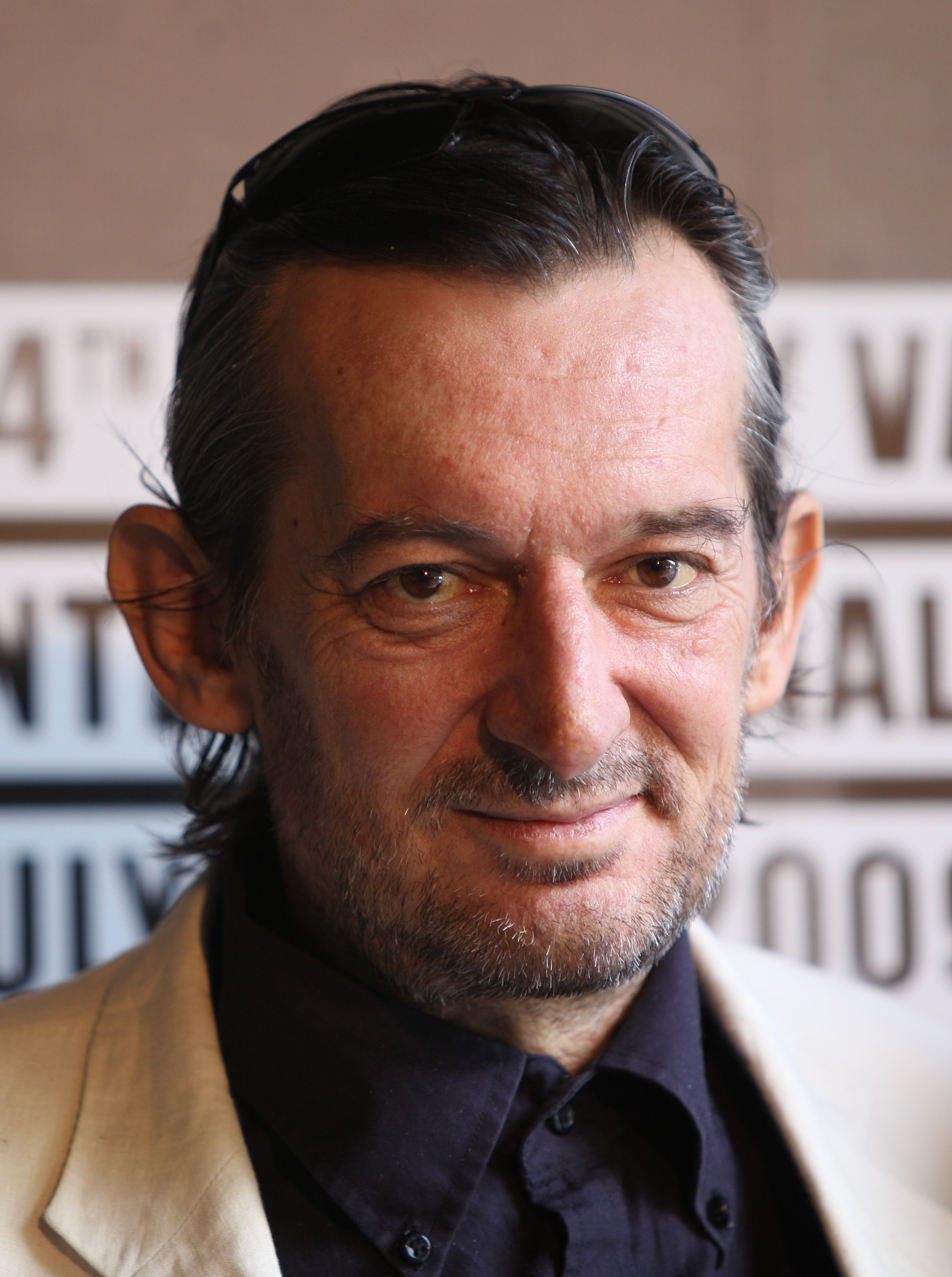
- Born: 29 August 1960; Kotor, PR Montenegro, Yugoslavia
- Died: 17 February 2011 (aged 50); Zagreb, Croatia
- Occupation: Actor
- Years active: 1983–2011

Predrag "Pređo" Vušović (29 August 1960 – 17 February 2011) was a Croatian actor. He appeared in more than fifty films from 1983 to 2011.

== Selected filmography ==
Year	Title	Role	Notes
2011	Koko and the Ghosts	Vincek	
2010	72 Days	Luka the Postman	
2009	Metastases	Dejo's father	
2008	Will Not End Here	Đuro	
2005	Pušća Bistra	Zvonarić	
2005	First Class Thieves	Hitman	
2003	Witnesses	Ljubo	
2001	The Last Will	Lou	
1999	Marshal Tito's Spirit	Toni	
1996	How the War Started on My Island	Murko Munita	
