= Horvatovi =

Croatian telenovela

- Genre: Comedy
- Based on: Los Serrano by: Daniel Écija; Álex Pina
- Starring: Bojana Gregorić; Goran Navojec; Bojan Navojec; Ljubomir Kerekeš
- Country of origin: Croatia
- Original language: Croatian
- No. of seasons: 1
- No. of episodes: 70

Production
- Production location: Zagreb, Croatia
- Production companies: RTL; Emotion

Original release
- Network: RTL
- Release: 7 September 2015 – 12 January 2016

Horvatovi ("The Horvats") is a Croatian comedy television series produced by RTL. The series centers on the Horvat family and stars Bojana Gregorić, Goran Navojec, Bojan Navojec, and Ljubomir Kerekeš.

The series ran for 70 episodes from 7 September 2015 to 12 January 2016 on RTL. Horvatovi is an adaptation of the Spanish drama series Los Serrano.

== Premise ==
The main roles are played by Goran Navojec and Bojana Gregorić. Stejpan (Goran Navojec) is the father of three sons, and Lila Horvat (Bojana Gregorić) is a mother to two daughters and Stejpan's high school sweetheart. The reunion after many years will be life-changing – Lili's life will be turned upside down when she moves to Zagreb to the home of Franjo Horvat (Ljubomir Kerekeš), whom she marries in the first episode. The Horvats thus become one big family with five children.

== Cast ==
- Bojana Gregorić as Lila Horvat
- Goran Navojec as Stjepan Horvat
- Bojan Navojec as Fedor
- Enes Vejzović as Andrija
- Elizabeta Kukić as Karmen
- Ljubomir Kerekeš as Franjo Horvat
- Marija Škaričić as Nikolina
- Ana Ledenko as Eva
- Adnan Prohić as Borna
- Tonka Pavić as Tereza
- Jan Begović as Branimir
- Adrian Hajsok as Krešimir
- Vojislav Brajović as Josip Joža
- Robert Budak as Davor
