= Oasis (2020 film) =

2020 film

- Directed by: Ivan Ikić
- Starring: Goran Bogdan
- Release dates: 3 September 2020 (Venice); 20 May 2021 (Serbia)
- Running time: 122 minutes
- Country: Serbia
- Language: Serbian

Oasis (Serbian: Оаза, romanized: Oaza) is a 2020 Serbian drama film directed by Ivan Ikić. It was selected as the Serbian entry for the Best International Feature Film at the 94th Academy Awards.

== Plot ==
At an institute for people with mental disabilities, a love triangle develops between three residents.

== Cast ==
- Goran Bogdan as Vaspitac Vlada
- Marusa Majer as Vaspitacica Vera
- Marijana Novakov as Marija
- Tijana Markovic as Dragana
- Valentino Zenuni as Robert

== See also ==
- List of submissions to the 94th Academy Awards for Best International Feature Film
- List of Serbian submissions for the Academy Award for Best International Feature Film
