= Father (2020 film) =

- Film poster
- Serbian: Oтац
- Directed by: Srdan Golubović
- Written by: Srdan Golubović; Ognjen Svilicić
- Produced by: Jelena Mitrović; Čedomir Kolar; Alexander Ris; Marc Baschet; Danis Tanović; Boris T. Matić; Lana Matić; Danijel Hočevar; Amra Bakšić Čamo; Adis Djapo
- Starring: Goran Bogdan; Boris Isaković; Nada Šargin; Milica Janevski
- Cinematography: Aleksandar Ilić
- Edited by: Petar Marković
- Production companies: Film House Baš Čelik; Propeler Film; SCCA/Pro. Ba Vertigo; Neue Mediopolis Filmproduktion; ASAP Films
- Release date: 2020
- Country: Serbia

Father (Serbian: Oтац, romanized: Otac) is a 2020 Serbian film directed by Srdan Golubović. It premiered as part of the Panorama programme at the 70th Berlin International Film Festival, where it won the Audience Award and the Prize of the Ecumenical Jury.

The film is based on the true story of a man from the Serbian town of Priboj, who, after his children had been taken away from him by local social services, travelled to Belgrade on foot in order to have his children returned to him.

== Cast ==
- Goran Bogdan as Nikola
- Boris Isaković as Vasiljević
- Nada Šargin as Biljana
- Milica Janevski as the Social Worker.

== Critical reception ==
Jessica Kiang of Variety had called the film "powerful, but grueling" and a "tough, but compelling downer".

== Accolades ==
Date	Award	Category	Recipient(s) and nominee(s)	Result	Notes
2022	35th Golden Rooster Awards	Best Foreign Language Film	Father	Won	

== See also ==
- List of Serbian films
- Cinema of Serbia
- FEST
