= Horseman (film) =

- Croatian: Konjanik
- Directed by: Branko Ivanda
- Written by: Drago Kekanović; Ivan Aralica
- Based on: Konjanik by Ivan Aralica
- Produced by: Telefilm; HRT
- Starring: Nikša Kušelj; Zrinka Cvitešić; Goran Grgić; Mladen Vulić
- Cinematography: Dragan Ruljančić
- Music by: Mojmir Novaković; Igor Savin; Kries
- Release date: 2003
- Running time: 136 minutes
- Country: Croatia
- Language: Croatian

Horseman (Croatian: Konjanik) is a 2003 Croatian film directed by Branko Ivanda. It is based on Ivan Aralica's 1971 novel of the same name.

The movie takes place in the early 18th century on the borders between the regions of Bosnia and Dalmatia, the crossroads of the Ottoman Empire and the Republic of Venice. It deals with issues relating to the region's native Croats as they struggle to live between two empires and two faiths: Catholicism and Islam. The film's main character Petar Revač, was played by Nikša Kušelj.

== Cast ==
- Nikša Kušelj as Petar Revač
- Zrinka Cvitešić as Lejla
- Goran Grgić as Andrija
- Mladen Vulić as Mujaga Lalić
- Borko Perić as Ivan Revač - Nikodim
- Božidar Orešković as the commander
- Dejan Aćimović as Begović
- Gordana Gadžić as Begovića
- Dragan Despot as Veliki
- Danko Ljuština as Džafer-beg
- Zijah Sokolović as Luda
