= Milan Pleština =

Croatian actor

- Born: 3 May 1961 (age 65); Split, PR Croatia, FPR Yugoslavia
- Occupation: Actor
- Years active: 1987–present

Milan Pleština (born 3 May 1961) is a Croatian actor. He appeared in more than thirty films since 1987.

== Selected filmography ==
Year	Title	Role	Notes
2004	The Society of Jesus	Father Had	
2009	The Lika Cinema	Doctor	
2012	Goltzius and the Pelican Company	Priest	
2013	The Brave Adventures of a Little Shoemaker	Black Man	
2013	Hush	Tata	
