= Victor Award =

Victor Award may refer to:

- Victor Award (Denmark), a Danish journalism award bestowed by Ekstra Bladet
- Victor Award (sport), a sports award bestowed by the National Academy of Sports Editors in the United States
- Victor Award (theatre), a series of local and national and international arts awards, bestowed by the Child's Play Touring Theatre in Chicago, United States

== See also ==
- Belgrade Victor Awards, film awards awarded at FEST film festival in Belgrade, Serbia
- Frances Fuller Victor Award for General Nonfiction, an American literary award bestowed by Literary Arts, Inc. in Oregon
- RCA Victor Award of Merit, an award bestowed on exceptional employees by American record company RCA Victor between 1945 and 1957
