= Nataša Janjić =

Croatian actress (born 1981)

Nataša Janjić-Medančić
- Born: Nataša Janjić; 27 November 1981 (age 44); Split, SR Croatia, SFR Yugoslavia (now Croatia)
- Occupation: Actress
- Years active: 2002–present
- Spouses: Joško Lokas (m. 2012; div. 2014) Nenad Medančić (m. 2019)

Nataša Janjić-Medančić (born 27 November 1981) is a Croatian film, stage and television actress.

== Personal life ==
Nataša Janjić was born in Split on 27 November 1981. As a child, she studied at the Youth Theatre in Split. After completing school in 2000, she went on to study journalism and acting in Zagreb.

Janjić previously dated director Antonio Nuić. In 2012, she began a relationship with Croatian actor and producer Joško Lokas, whom she married. The couple later divorced. In 2014, Janjić married her second husband, Nenad Medančić. Together, Janjić and Medančić have a son and a daughter.

== Filmography ==
Film
Year	Title	Role	Notes
2005	I Love You	Nataša	
2006	All for Free	Maja	
2007	True Miracle	woman	
2009	In the Land of Wonders	Dunja	
2009	Donkey	Jasna	
2009	St. George Shoots the Dragon	Katarina	
2012	Vegetarian Cannibal	Mia	
2014	Holidays in the Sun		
2015	You Carry Me	Lidija	
2016	Goran	Lina	
2018	Comic Sans	Marina	
2026	The Last Roman God	Prisca	

TV
Year	Title	Role	Notes
2005	Naša mala klinika	Ankica Hmelj	1 episode
2007	Bibin svijet	Tamara	
2006–2008	A Mess in the House	Tamara Šušnjara	
2008–2009	Mamutica	Martina	
2009	Na terapiji	Maja	
2010	Tito	Olga Hebrang	
2010	The Secret Diary of a Duck Mathilda	Roza, the Pig	
2011	Just the Two of Us	Herself	
