= Goran Bogdan =

Croatian actor (born 1980)

- Born: 2 October 1980 (age 45); Lištica, SR Bosnia and Herzegovina, Yugoslavia
- Citizenship: Croatia; Bosnia and Herzegovina
- Education: Faculty of Economics and Business, University of Zagreb
- Occupation: Actor
- Years active: 2005–present
- Partner: Jovana Stojiljković (2019–present)
- Children: 1

Goran Bogdan (born 2 October 1980) is a Croatian actor. He has appeared in more than 40 films since 2005, including the Academy Award-nominated The Man Who Could Not Remain Silent (2024).

He has appeared in some American and English films and TV series such as the 2012 film Goltzius and the Pelican Company, and the third season of the television series Fargo. He also starred in the 2015 TV series The Last Panthers, alongside Samantha Morton and John Hurt.

== Early life and career ==
Bogdan was born on 2 October 1980 in Lištica (today Široki Brijeg) in Herzegovina to ethnic Croat parents. He graduated at Faculty of Economics and Business of University of Zagreb, and started his acting career in The Zagreb Youth Theater. He later enrolled at Academy of Dramatic Arts, from which he graduated in 2012.

In 2013, he was named the theatre actor of the year by the Teatar.hr Awards. For his role in the Branko Schmidt film Agape, he won the 2017 Vladimir Nazor Award for excellence in film. His role in the 2020 film Father earned him universal acclaim and made history by becoming the first Croatian actor nominated at the European Film Awards for Best Actor.

He currently resides in Zagreb, Croatia.

== Personal life ==
He has been in a relationship with Serbian actress Jovana Stojiljković since 2019, and they have one child, born in 2024.

== Filmography ==
=== Film ===
| Year | Title | Role | Notes |
|---|---|---|---|
| 2006 | Garfield: A Tail of Two Kitties | McBunny | Voice; Croatian dub |
| 2007 | Za naivne dječake | Dario Šimić | Short film |
| 2008 | Iza stakla | Radnik | |
| 2009 | Dirty Little Bubbles | Suprug / Papak | Short film |
| 2010 | Neke druge priče | Marin | |
| 2010 | The Show Must Go On | Vojnik | |
| 2010 | Harakiri djeca | | Short film |
| 2010 | Šampion | Mladi vojnik | Short film |
| 2011 | View from a Well | Marin | Short film |
| 2011 | Pink Express | Gogo | Short film |
| 2011 | Noć za Dvoje | Goran | Short film |
| 2011 | Romkom | | Short film |
| 2012 | Iris | | Short film |
| 2012 | Sonja and the Bull | Ante | |
| 2012 | Ivo | Davor | Short film |
| 2012 | Goltzius and the Pelican Company | Gottlieb | |
| 2012 | Točkica na nosu | | Short film |
| 2013 | The Priest's Children | Jure | |
| 2013 | Soba 3 | | Short film |
| 2013 | Moj sin samo malo sporije hoda | Tin | |
| 2013 | Majstori | Ilija | |
| 2014 | Number 55 | Tomo | |
| 2014 | The Kids from the Marx and Engels Street | Stanko | |
| 2014 | Takva su pravila | Doktor | |
| 2015 | We Will Be the World Champions | Nikola Plećaš | |
| 2015 | Imena višnje | | |
| 2015 | Svinjari | | |
| 2015 | Goran | | |
| 2015 | Our Everyday Life | | |
| 2017 | All Inclusive | | |
| 2017 | Agape | Miran | |
| 2020 | Father | Nikola | |
| 2020 | Oasis | | |
| 2023 | Faraway | Josip | |
| 2024 | The Man Who Could Not Remain Silent | Dragan | Short film |
| 2024 | 78 Days | Stefan | |
| 2025 | Sore: Istri dari Masa Depan | Karlo | |
| 2026 | Storm Rider: Legend of Hammerhead | Larry | |

=== Television ===
| Year | Title | Role | Notes |
|---|---|---|---|
| 2005 | Zabranjena ljubav | Čuljak | |
| 2007 | Obični ljudi | Nebojša | |
| 2007 | Operacija Kajman | Ivo Španković | |
| 2007 | Cimmer fraj | Marko | |
| 2007–2008 | Zauvijek susjedi | Andrej | |
| 2008 | Luda kuća | Jozo | |
| 2008 | Ponos Ratkajevih | Stražar | |
| 2008 | Odmori se, zaslužio si | Nikola | |
| 2009 | Mamutica | Darko | |
| 2009 | Bitange i princeze | Ozren | |
| 2013 | Stipe u gostima | Boris | |
| 2013 | Na terapiji | Jozo | |
| 2015 | The Last Panthers | Milan Celik | 6 episodes |
| 2016 | Vere i zavere | Sergije | |
| 2017 | Fargo | Yuri Gurka | 6 episodes |
| 2017–2019 | Balkan Shadows | Mustafa Golubić | |
| 2020 | Strike Back: Vendetta | Edon Demachi | 2 episodes |
| 2021 | Vreme zla | Bogdan Dragović | 14 episodes |
