= Dražen Kühn =

Croatian actor (born 1965)

- Born: 1965 (age 60–61); Špišić Bukovica, Yugoslavia
- Occupation: Actor
- Years active: 1991-present

Dražen Kühn (born 1965) is a Croatian actor. He has appeared in more than forty films since 1991.

== Selected filmography ==
=== Film ===
Year	Title	Role	Notes
1997	Tranquilizer Gun		
1998	When the Dead Start Singing		
1999	Marshal Tito's Spirit		
2001	Go, Yellow		
2003	Witnesses		
2003	The Doctor of Craziness		
2003	Infection		
2008	Will Not End Here		
2009	Storm	Goran Duric	
2013	The Priest's Children	Marin	
2016	Ministry of Love	Sikic	
2023	Bosnian pot		
