= Zrinka Cvitešić =

Croatian actress (born 1979)

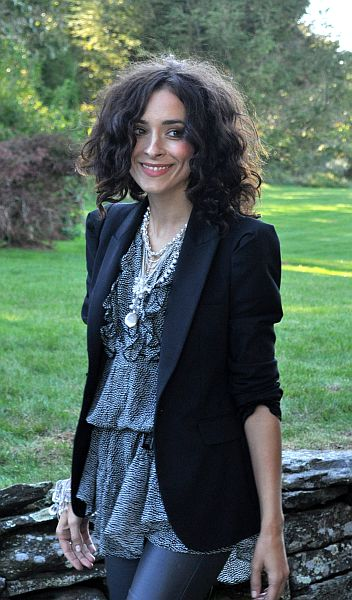
- Cvitešić in 2010
- Born: 18 July 1979 (age 46); Karlovac, Croatia
- Education: Academy of Dramatic Art, University of Zagreb
- Occupation: Actor
- Years active: 1999–present
- Partner(s): Hrvoje Rupčić (2009–2014); Niko Kranjčar (2014–)
- Awards: Order of Danica Hrvatska

Zrinka Cvitešić (born 18 July 1979) is a Croatian film, television and theatre actress.

== Biography ==
The elder of two daughters, Zrinka Cvitešić was born in Karlovac, in the Karlovac County to Ivan and Višnja Cvitešić. Her mother played organ in a local Catholic parish near her hometown. Cvitešić started acting at elementary school and her first role was Cinderella. As a theatre actress, she has been a member of the Croatian National Theatre since 2005. In April 2013, Cvitešić made her West End debut at the Phoenix Theatre in London as "Girl" in the musical Once. Her performance received rave reviews, and she won Laurence Olivier Award for Best Actress in a Musical.

For her performance in the 2005 film What Is a Man Without a Moustache?, Cvitešić won awards for best actress in a leading role both at the 53rd Pula Film Festival and the 11th Sarajevo Film Festival. She received the Shooting Stars Award, the annual acting award for up-and-coming actors by European Film Promotion, at the 60th Berlin International Film Festival in 2010. Cvitešić has been a recipient of Golden Arena, the top prize at Pula Film Festival for her work in the film On the Path.

== Personal life ==
Cvitešić was in relationship with Croatian musician Hrvoje Rupčić, but they broke up in 2014. She has been dating footballer Niko Kranjčar since they met in 2014.

== Filmography ==
=== Movie roles ===
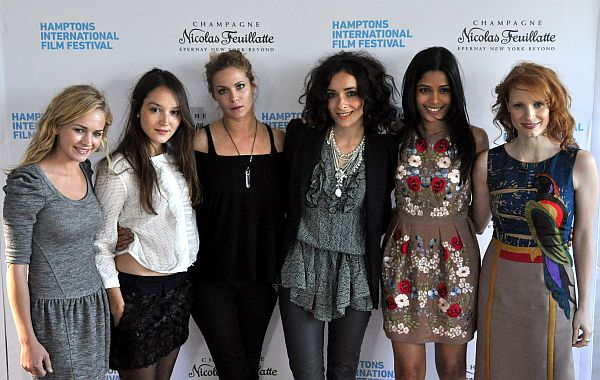
Britt Robertson, Anais Demoustier, Pihla Viitala, Zrinka Cvitešić, Freida Pinto and Jessica Chastain at Hamptons International Film Festival

Year	Film	Role	Notes
1999	Rano buđenje	Djevojka	Short film
2000	Veliko spremanje	Sara	
2001	Celestial Body	Nurse	
2002	Persona	?	
2003	Horseman	Lejla	
2004	Katarza	?	
2004	La Femme Musketeer	Elena	
2004	Čuvaj se sinjske ruke	Curly Whore	
2005	What Is a Man Without a Moustache?	Tatjana	Best Actress at the 53rd Pula Film Festival Best Actress at the 11th Sarajevo Film Festival
2005	Volim te	Squosh Girl	
2009	Zagrebačke priče	?	
2009	Libertango	Sophie	
2010	On the Path	Luna	Best Actress Award at the Alexandria Film Festival; The Golden Arena for Best Actress; Nomination - European Film Award
2010	Torta s čokoladom	Julijana	
2011	Lea and Darija	Ivka Deutsch	
2011	Bella Biondina	Vinka	
2012	My Beautiful Country	Danica	
2012	Vegetarian Cannibal	Dr. Lovrić	
2017	Lost in London	Suen	Starring with Woody Harrelson and Owen Wilson
2017	Lucky Accident Crash	Tara	

=== Television roles ===
Year	Film	Role	Notes
2006–2007	Ples sa zvijezdama (Croatian version of Strictly Come Dancing)	Competitor	Won
2008	Vratiće se rode	Mara	
2010	Cinema 3	Davorjanka Paunović	
2010	Tito	Davorjanka Paunović	
2015	London Spy	Sara	
2015	Capital	Matya	
2023	The Power	Tatiana Moskalev	Main role

Preceded by None	Ples sa zvijezdama winner Season 1 (2006 with Nicolas Quesnoit)	Succeeded by Luka Nižetić & Mirjana Žutić
