= Ivan Brkić (actor) =

- Born: 15 January 1960; Vinkovci, PR Croatia, FPR Yugoslavia
- Died: 5 September 2015 (aged 55); Zagreb, Croatia
- Occupation: Actor
- Years active: 1988–2015

Ivan Brkić (15 January 1960 – 5 September 2015) was a Croatian actor. He appeared in more than forty films from 1988 to 2015.

== Selected filmography ==
Year	Title	Role	Notes
1994	The Price of Life		
1996	How the War Started on My Island		
1997	Comanche Territory		
2000	Cashier Wants to Go to the Seaside		
2004	Long Dark Night		
2004	Sorry for Kung Fu		
2009	Metastases		
2013	The Priest's Children		
2016	On the Other Side		
