= Exit Theatre =

Coordinates: 45.81245°N 15.94998°E

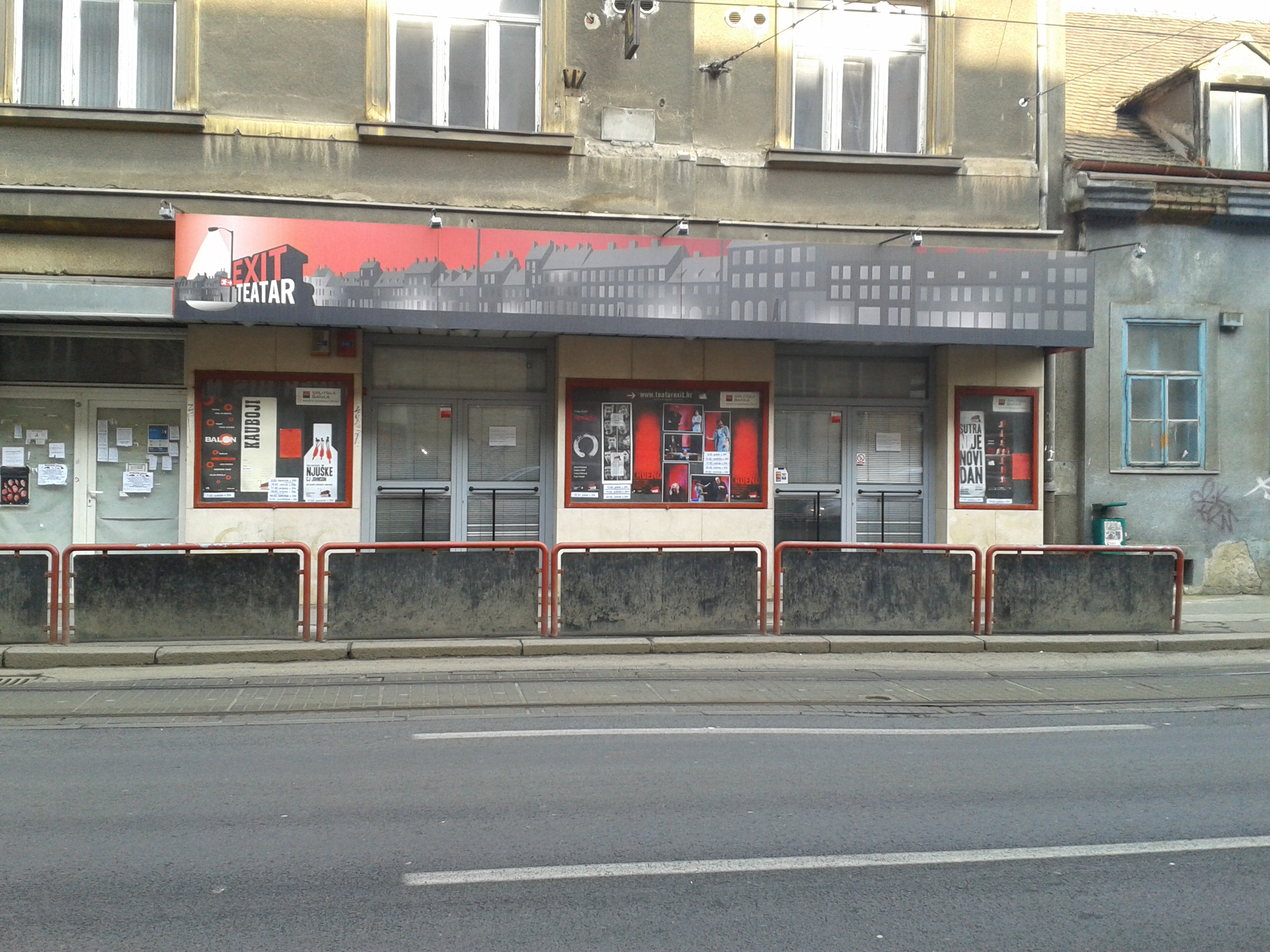
Exit

Exit Theatre (Croatian: Teatar Exit), sometimes stylized as EXIT, is an independent theatre in Zagreb, Croatia whose productions are mainly oriented towards adults. The theatre has won hundreds of awards and frequently performs abroad. In 2009, it was declared as one of top Croatian brands.

== History ==
The theatre was founded on 23 September 1994 by Matko Raguž and Nataša Lušetić and is currently located in Ilica 208, the location they hold since 1998 by adapting an old cinema. The theater's original productions explore significant societal topics and are characterized as being rooted in a "process-oriented collaboration among all participants." The theater perceives itself as a shared workshop, where every contributor holds equal authorship. The theatre had a major impact on the Croatian theatre scene during the nineties, but subsequently entered financial troubles, after which it began staging productions for children, producing successful dramatisations of Adrian Mole.

== Legacy ==
The theatre was received exceptionally well and it and its plays have earned numerous awards including the City of Zagreb award twice. Some plays, such as Kauboji have been performed 500 times.
