= Five Days of Zagreb in Sarajevo =

- Genre: Cultural festival
- Date: June
- Frequency: annual
- Locations: Sarajevo, Bosnia and Herzegovina
- Years active: 2008 - present
- Area: Bosnia and Herzegovina
- Website: jabih.com

Five Days of Zagreb in Sarajevo (Croatian: Pet dana Zagreba u Sarajevu) is an annual cultural festival held in Sarajevo, Bosnia and Herzegovina that celebrates Croatian culture. It was established in 2009 by Association for Promotion of Culture and Art " Ja BiH.." Zagreb and HKD Napredak. The festival hosts a five-day programme that includes numerous art exhibitions, film screenings, music concerts, art workshops and theatre productions. It is endorsed by the governments of the Federation of Bosnia and Herzegovina and the Republic of Croatia.
