= Franjo Dijak =

Croatian actor

- Born: 2 June 1977 (age 48); Zagreb, SR Croatia, Yugoslavia
- Occupation: Actor
- Years active: 1997–present

Franjo Dijak (born 2 June 1977) is a Croatian actor. He appeared in more than twenty films since 1997.

Dijak provides the voice of Po in the Croatian dub of the entire Kung Fu Panda franchise.

== Selected filmography ==
Year	Title	Role	Notes
1997	Mondo Bobo	Mislav	
1998	Cimbelin	Blaž	Short film
2004	Sex, Drink and Bloodshed	Njonjo	
2005	First Class Thieves	Nenad	
2006	The Border Post	Alen	
2006	All for Free	Josip	
2006	The Border Post	Alen	
2006	All for Free	Josip	
2008	Behind the Glass	Maja's brother	
2009	Metastases	Filip	
2009	The Blacks	Franjo	
2011	Koko and the Ghosts	Drago	
2016	Goran	Goran	
2018	Mali	Frankie	
