= Marshal Tito's Spirit =

Marshal Tito's Spirit (Croatian: Maršal) is a 1999 Croatian film directed by Vinko Brešan. It was Croatia's submission to the 73rd Academy Awards for the Academy Award for Best Foreign Language Film, but was not accepted as a nominee.

== Synopsis ==
The film centers on the Croatian island of Vis in 1998. During the funeral of a local Yugoslav Partisan veteran, his elderly comrades start seeing the ghost of Marshal Josip Broz Tito. After rumours about the apparition spread around, a Split-based policeman who goes by the name Stipan is ordered to investigate the suspicious movements of members of the Partisan veterans' association, SUBNOR, in his hometown, a remote Adriatic island whose only connection with the mainland is a ferry that comes around once a week.

Stipan's investigation goes awry, because the leader of former local fighters, Marinko Čičin, considers him a traitor to socialism and a collaborator with the enemy, while locals only speculate of what happened. Stipan learns about the ghost of Comrade Tito from a middle-aged married couple of painters from Zagreb who are looking for inspiration on the island. After a week of investigation, Stipan returns to Split on a ferry together with a large group of locals. The Split mayor Luka, who had previously privatized all state objects in the town, smells a business opportunity and begins organizing communist-era events to attract tourism (May Day parades, Relay of Youth, etc.) and maximise profits. Local Partisan veterans of the 7th Dalmatian Brigade led by Marinko decide to take arms and control the town, turning it into the communist-era shape. The island becomes a pilgrimage destination for retired fighters, who come in droves from the mainland to the island in belief that the time has come for the return of socialism.

== Cast ==
- Dražen Kühn as Stipan
- Linda Begonja as Slavica
- Ilija Ivezić as Marinko Cicin
- Ivo Gregurević as Luka
- Boris Buzančić as Jakov
- Ljubo Kapor as Bura
- Inge Appelt as Mare
- Bojan Navojec as Miuko
- Predrag Vušović as Toni
- Boris Svrstan as Lijan Mulderić
- Ksenija Pajić as Danica Skulić

== Awards and nominations ==
The film received 3 nominations and won 9 awards at various international film festivals. Among them, Vinko Brešan won the Best Director Award at the 36th Karlovy Vary International Film Festival.

== See also ==
- Cinema of Croatia
- List of submissions to the 73rd Academy Awards for Best Foreign Language Film
