= Vegetarian Cannibal =

2012 film

- Film poster
- Croatian: Ljudožder vegetarijanac
- Directed by: Branko Schmidt
- Written by: Ivo Balenović; Branko Schmidt
- Based on: Ljudožder vegetarijanac by Ivo Balenović
- Produced by: Stanislav Babić
- Starring: Rene Bitorajac; Nataša Janjić; Leon Lučev; Zrinka Cvitešić; Emir Hadžihafizbegović
- Cinematography: Dragan Ruljančić
- Release date: 1 March 2012
- Running time: 85 minutes
- Country: Croatia
- Language: Croatian

Vegetarian Cannibal (Croatian: Ljudožder vegetarijanac) is a 2012 Croatian drama film directed by Branko Schmidt. It was released on 1 March 2012 and stars Rene Bitorajac as an immoral doctor.

== Plot ==
Danko Babić (Rene Bitorajac) is highly successful and much sought after as a doctor of gynecology, but at the same time he is also incredibly ambitious and willing to do whatever it takes to succeed. These traits eventually lead him to Jedinko (Emir Hadžihafizbegović), a pimp who specializes in high-end prostitution and drug dealing. He's willing to pay Danko a considerable sum to perform abortions on his prostitutes, who get pregnant on a regular basis. Danko quickly gets pulled into a world of organized crime, corruption, and scandal.

== Cast ==
- Rene Bitorajac as Danko Babić
- Nataša Janjić as Nurse Lana
- Leon Lučev as Ilija
- Emir Hadžihafizbegović as Jedinko
- Zrinka Cvitešić as Dr. Lovrić
- Daria Lorenci as Dr. Miller
- Ksenija Pajić as Dr. Domljan
- Ozren Grabarić as Mario Filipović
- Mustafa Nadarević as Pathologist Marelja
- Robert Ugrina as Dr. Soldo
- Krešimir Mikić as Dr. Bantić
- Rakan Rushaidat as Hassan Al Sadat
- Ljubomir Kerekeš as Professor Matić
- Zdenko Jelčić as Colonel
- Slaven Knezović as Smoljo
- Ksenija Marinković as Patient Švarc

== Production ==
The film was based on the eponymous novel by Ivo Balenović, also known by the pen name "Alen Bović".

== Reception ==
Film School Rejects was mixed in their review, praising Bitorajac's acting while commenting that the film's ending "will easily divide the audience". The Austinist was more positive, stating "Yes, this movie is kind of a downer, but adventurous filmgoers will probably find Vegetarian Cannibal to be worth their time".

The film was selected as the Croatian entry for the Best Foreign Language Film at the 85th Academy Awards, but it did not make the final shortlist.

Lead actor Bitorajac states that he views the character of Danko as the "most despicable character he has ever played" and that while he was initially leery of the script, he was satisfied after seeing the completed product.

=== Awards ===
- Golden Arena for Best Actor (Rene Bitorajac) at the Pula Film Festival (2012, won)
- Golden Arena for Best Director at the Pula Film Festival (2012, won)
- Golden Arena for Best Cinematography at the Pula Film Festival (2012, won)
- Best Art Direction at the Pula Film Festival (2012, won)
- Best Achievement in Make-Up at the Pula Film Festival (2012, won)
- Kodak Award at the Pula Film Festival (2012, won)

== See also ==
- List of submissions to the 85th Academy Awards for Best Foreign Language Film
- List of Croatian submissions for the Academy Award for Best Foreign Language Film
