= Vlatko Dulić =

- Born: 20 April 1943; Szabadka, Kingdom of Hungary (now Subotica, Serbia)
- Died: 20 November 2015 (aged 72); Zagreb, Croatia
- Occupation: Actor
- Years active: 1968–2015

Vlatko Dulić (20 April 1943 – 20 November 2015) was a Croatian theatre, television and film actor and theatre director.

Hailing from Subotica in Vojvodina, at the time also in Yugoslavia, Dulić studied acting at the Zagreb Academy of Dramatic Art, where he graduated from in 1970 but he began acting as early as 1968 at the Gavella theatre in Zagreb.

He appeared in a number of supporting roles in Croatian TV series and feature films in a career spanning over four decades, including Vinko Brešan's popular comedies How the War Started on My Island (1996) and Marshal Tito's Spirit (1999). He died on 20 November 2015, aged 72.

== Selected filmography ==
- A Man Who Liked Funerals (Čovjek koji je volio sprovode, 1989)
- How the War Started on My Island (Kako je počeo rat na mom otoku, 1996)
- Marshal Tito's Spirit (Maršal, 1999)
- Madonna (Bogorodica, 1999)
- Cashier Wants to Go to the Seaside (Blagajnica hoće ići na more, 2000)
- Sleep Sweet, My Darling (Snivaj, zlato moje, 2005)
- Libertas (2006)
