= Damir Karakaš =

Croatian writer

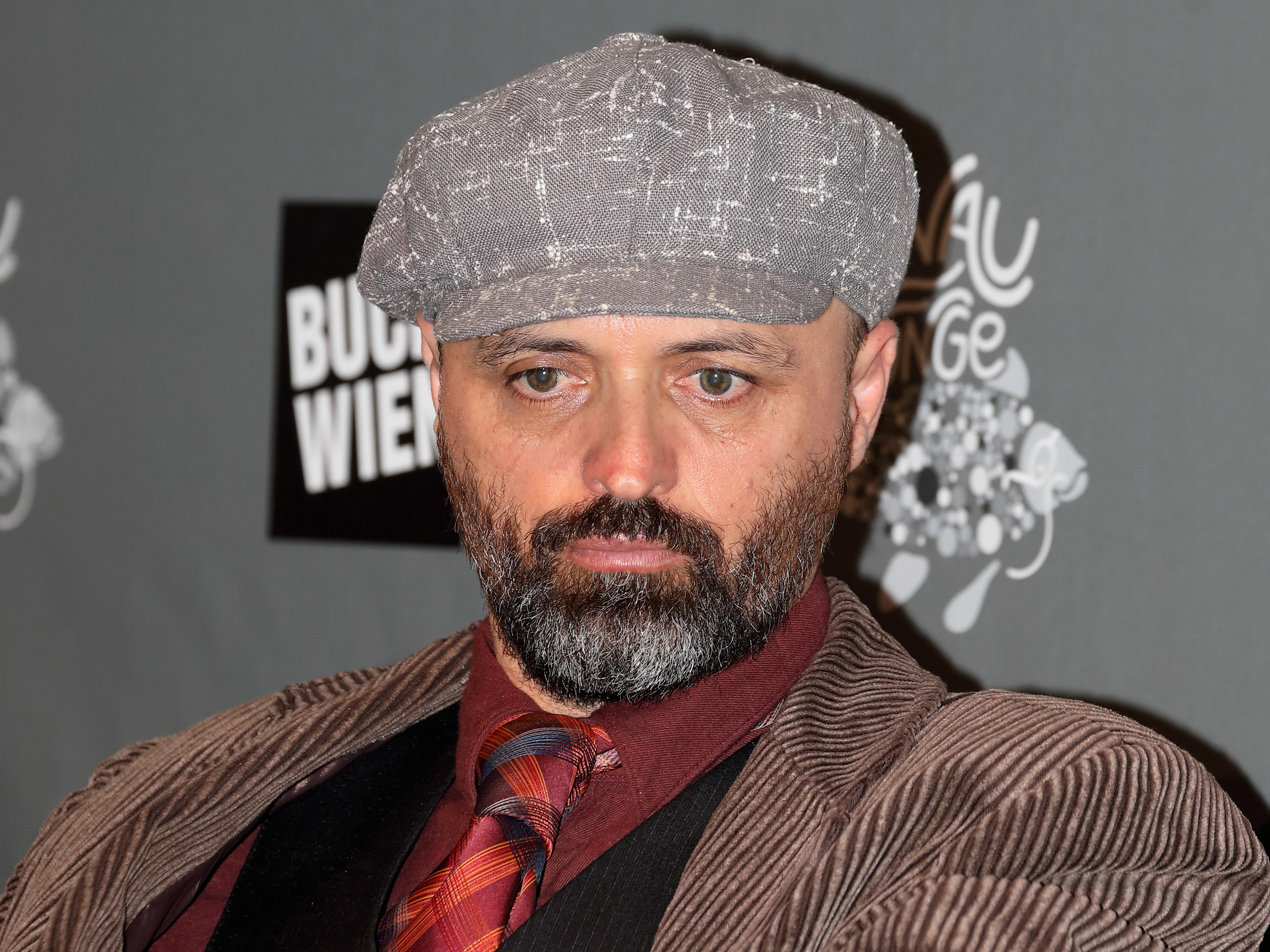
Photo of Damir Karakas

Damir Karakaš (born 1967 in Plašćica near Brinje, Croatia) is a Croatian writer.

== Early life and career ==
Karakaš went to high school in Senj and Zagreb. He graduated in law in 1993. He has worked as a journalist for the Croatian newspaper Večernji list. From 2001 to 2007, he lived in France. He has participated in the Croatian War of Independence. He made his debut with the book of travelogues Bosanci su dobri ljudi (Bosnians are good people, 1999). The novel Kombetari (2000) tells the story of what it was like to defend Lika in the early 1990s. In 2001, he published a collection of stories called Kino Lika, which was adapted into a film of the same name, The Lika Cinema, by director Dalibor Matanić in 2008. His novel Sjajno mjesto za nesreću (A great place for an accident, 2009) is a story about Paris through the eyes of an immigrant, writer from Croatia who tries to survive by drawing caricatures for tourists. For the novel Sjećanje šume (Memory of the Forest, 2016), he received the Fric Award for the best prose book in Croatia in 2017, the regional Petar Kočić Award for high achievements in contemporary literature, and the prestigious Italian literary award Premio ITAS for 2021. He published a novel Proslava in 2019. The translation of the novel, Celebration (2024) was included in World Literature Today's 75 Notable Translations of 2024. The same novel was included in the list of best books of the 2024 by the literary magazine The Paris Review. In 2021, he published the novel Okretište (Interchange). In 2017, Karakaš has signed Declaration on the Common Language.

== Personal life ==
Karakaš has been married twice. His first marriage lasted from 1993 to 1997. He is currently married to Mitra. He has three daughters.

== Works ==
- Bosanci su dobri ljudi (Bosnians are good people), 1999
- Kombetari (Domoljub) (Patriot), 2000.
- Kino Lika (The Lika Cinema), 2001
- Kako sam ušao u Europu: reality roman (How I entered Europe: a reality novel), 2004
- Eskimi (Eskimos), 2007
- Sjajno mjesto za nesreću (A great place for an accident), 2009
- Pukovnik Beethoven (Colonel Beethoven), 2012
- Blue moon 2014
- Sjećanje šume (A Memory of the Forest), 2016
- Proslava (Celebration), 2019
- Okretište (Turnstile), 2021
- Potop (Flood), 2023
- Avijatičari i druge drame (Aviators and other dramas), 2023

== Celebration (2019) ==
Celebration was translated from the Croatian by Ellen Elias-Bursać, a translator of Croatian, Bosnian and Serbian who has served as the president of the American Literary Translators’ Association. Between 1972 and 1990 she lived in Zagreb and for six years worked in the English Translation Unit of the International Criminal Tribunal for the former Yugoslavia in the Hague, Netherlands.

Awards

- Shortlisted for the EBRD Prize 2025
- Included in the Best Books of the Year for The Paris Review
