= Božidar Orešković =

Croatian actor

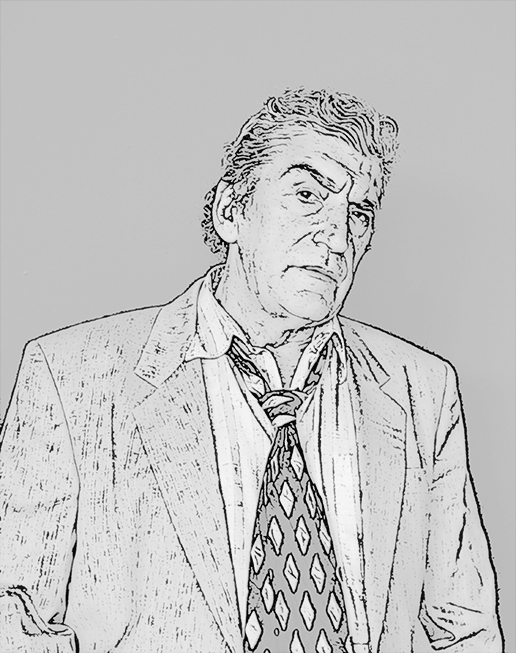
- Born: 21 August 1942; Zagreb, Independent State of Croatia
- Died: 9 July 2010 (aged 67); Kozjača, Croatia
- Occupation: Actor
- Years active: 1963–2010

Božidar Orešković (21 August 1942 – 9 July 2010) was a Croatian actor. He appeared in more than fifty films from 1963 to 2010.

== Selected filmography ==
Year	Title	Role	Notes
2007	The Living and the Dead		
2005	I Love You		
2004	Accidental Co-Traveller		
1998	Delusion		
1996	How the War Started on My Island		
1990	Eagle		
