= 72 Days =

2010 film

- Film poster
- Directed by: Danilo Šerbedžija
- Written by: Danilo Šerbedžija
- Starring: Rade Šerbedžija; Bogdan Diklić; Krešimir Mikić; Živko Anočić
- Cinematography: Saša Rendulić
- Edited by: Ivana Fumić
- Music by: Miroslav Tadić
- Release date: 20 July 2010
- Running time: 93 minutes
- Countries: Croatia; Serbia
- Languages: Croatian; Serbian

72 Days (Serbo-Croatian: Sedamdeset i dva dana) is a 2010 Croatian-Serbian black comedy film directed by Danilo Šerbedžija and starring Rade Šerbedžija. The film was selected as the Croatian entry for the Best Foreign Language Film at the 84th Academy Awards, but it did not make the final shortlist.

== Cast ==
- Rade Šerbedžija as Mane
- Krešimir Mikić as Branko
- Bogdan Diklić as Joja
- Živko Anočić as Todor
- Mira Banjac as Baba Neđa
- Dejan Aćimović as Mile
- Lucija Šerbedžija as Liča
- Nebojša Glogovac as Dane the policeman
- Predrag Vušović as Luka the postman
- Dragan Nikolić as Loan shark 1

== See also ==
- List of submissions to the 84th Academy Awards for Best Foreign Language Film
- List of Croatian submissions for the Academy Award for Best Foreign Language Film
