= The Melon Route =

- Directed by: Branko Schmidt
- Written by: Branko Schmidt; Ognjen Sviličić
- Produced by: Stanislav Babić
- Starring: Krešimir Mikić; Sun Mei; Leon Lučev
- Cinematography: Vjekoslav Vrdoljak
- Release date: 18 July 2006
- Running time: 89 minutes
- Country: Croatia
- Language: Croatian

The Melon Route (Croatian: Put lubenica) is a Croatian drama film directed by Branko Schmidt. It was released in 2006.

== Cast ==
- Krešimir Mikić - Mirko
- Sun Mei - Chinese girl
- Leon Lučev - Seki
- Armin Omerović - Meho
- Emir Hadžihafizbegović - Gojko
- Ivo Gregurević - Cale
- Slobodan Maksimović - Edo
- Zijah Sokolović - Pauk
- Darijo Veličan - Covjek sa paralizom
- Elena Dlesk - Ruskinja #1
- Dora Lipovčan - Ruskinja #2
- Filip Šovagović - Lak
- Iljo Benković Drca - Kolega
- Chen Samin - Stari Kinez
