= Nataša Dorčić =

Croatian actress (born 1968)

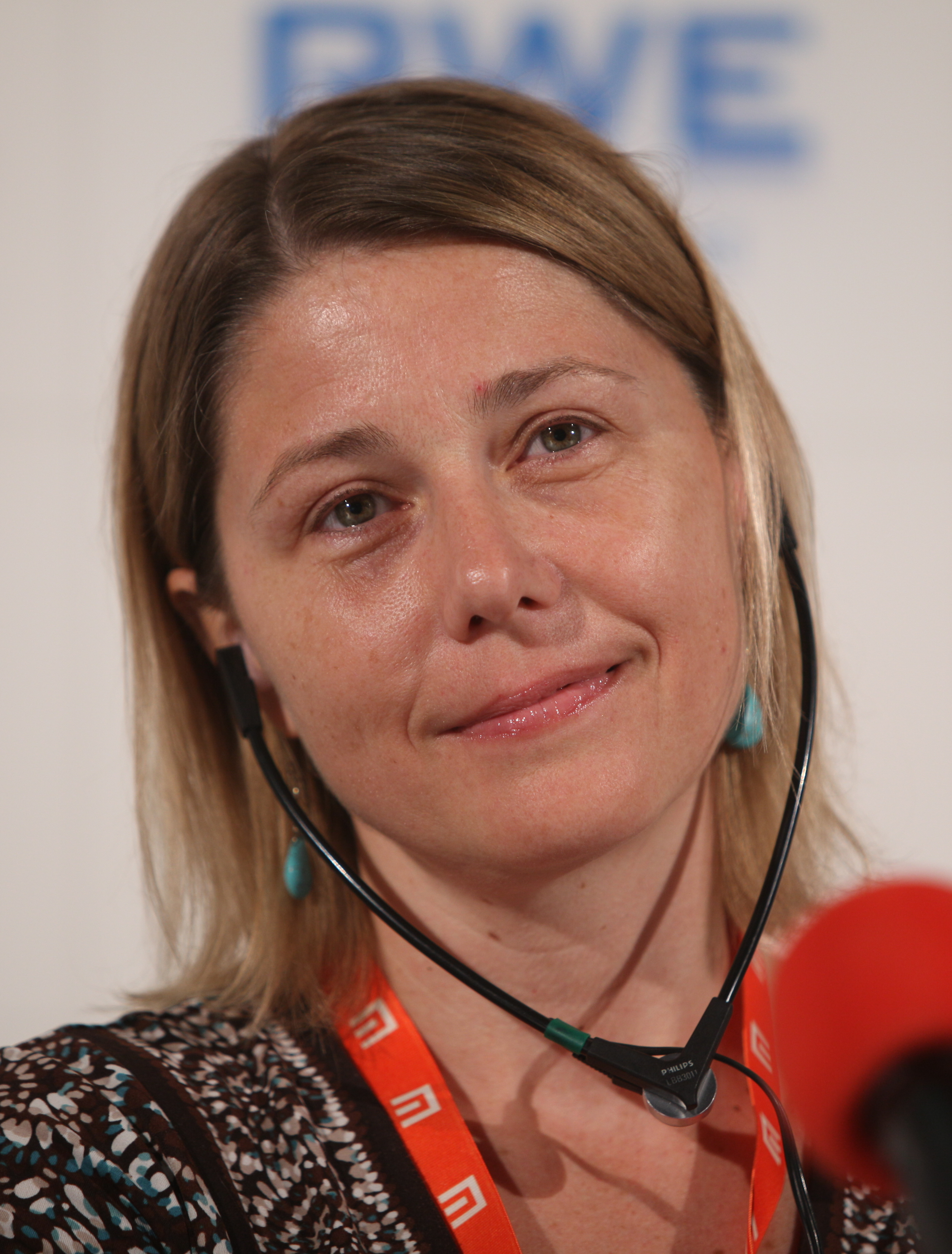
- Born: 9 June 1968 (age 57); Rijeka, SR Croatia, SFR Yugoslavia
- Occupation: Actress
- Years active: 1990–present
- Spouse: Sven Medvešek (divorced)
- Children: Toma; Tit Emanuel; Roza

Nataša Dorčić (born 9 June 1968 in Rijeka) is a Croatian theatre, film and television actress.

Dorčić graduated from the Zagreb Academy of Dramatic Art in 1998, but started acting professionally as early as 1994, when she joined the Croatian National Theatre in Zagreb (HNK). In 1996 she left HNK to join the Zagreb Youth Theatre (Zagrebačko kazalište mladih or ZKM) and has remained their member ever since.

She started appearing in television and feature films in mid 1990s, and her role in Snježana Tribuson's 1996 film Prepoznavanje won her the Golden Arena for Best Actress at the 1996 Pula Film Festival, the Croatian national film awards festival and she went on to win her second Golden Arena award in 2007 for starring in Dejan Aćimović's drama film I Have to Sleep, My Angel.

== Selected filmography ==
- Mondo Bobo (1997)
- I Have to Sleep, My Angel (Moram spavat', anđele, 2007)
- Just Between Us (Neka ostane među nama, 2010)
- You Carry Me (2015)
