= The Show Must Go On (2010 film) =

2010 Croatian science fiction film by Nevio Marasović

- Film poster
- Directed by: Nevio Marasović
- Screenplay by: Nevio Marasović
- Produced by: Saša Bijelić; Nevio Marasović
- Starring: Sven Medvešek; Nataša Dorčić; Filip Juričić; Amar Bukvić; Josip Vujčić
- Cinematography: Damir Kudin
- Edited by: Marko Ferković
- Music by: Željko Marasović
- Release dates: 17 July 2010 (Pula Film Festival); 26 April 2011 (Croatia)
- Running time: 80 minutes
- Country: Croatia
- Language: Croatian
- Budget: 200,000 kn (c. US$40,000)

The Show Must Go On is a 2010 Croatian science fiction drama directed and written by Nevio Marasović, starring Sven Medvešek and Nataša Dorčić.

A dystopian story about a TV producer who keeps his reality show's contestants unaware of a global war raging outside their compound, Marasović's debut feature film debut was shot on a very low budget. It won several awards at the Croatian national film festival in Pula and was welcomed by the critics, despite receiving mixed reviews.

== Plot ==
As a result of Croatia joining the European Union in 2013, the country saw massive economical advancement, stabilizing the entire country. Meanwhile, an Asian terrorist coalition has destabilized the relations between Asia and Western countries.

In 2020, producer Filip Dogan (Sven Medvešek) starts Housed!, a reality show featuring six couples who live in an isolated, Big Brother-like house in Zagreb for 180 days. After a while, international tensions between Western countries and their unidentified Asian rival escalate into a global war which turns the entire European continent into a battlefield. Military aircraft are flying over Zagreb, and some of the city's landmarks, such as Zagreb Cathedral and Cibona Tower, are in ruins.

Having been cut off from access to media and outside contacts, the show's participants are completely unaware of goings-on outside their house, and their carelessness and preoccupation with trivialities suddenly become fascinating for the viewers, which boosts the show's ratings. Recognizing a winning formula, Dogan spares no effort to keep the participants from finding out what is going on outside the compound, while maintaining a tense relationship with his ex-wife Helena (Nataša Dorčić), a journalist at a competing TV channel.

== Background and production ==
Marasović's inspiration for the screenplay came from the Croatian version of Big Brother. Its second season coincided with the global outbreak of avian influenza in 2005, and, after the show ended, some of the competitors were shocked to learn that some parts of the country were under a military-enforced quarantine, which made Marasović think about what would happen if the show's participants faced a much bigger catastrophe upon their return to the real world.

The film was shot in the summer of 2008, over 45 days. A Sony EX1 digital camera with Nikon lenses was used for filming.

Of 450 shots in the film, as many as 300 included special effects. Despite this, Marasović said that special effects were being used exclusively to support the story, and described The Show Must Go On as a "pure drama". The post-production was lengthy, extending, according to Marasović, literally to the film's premiere.

Sven Medvešek described his role as "highly interesting" and a "huge challenge", due to the fact that he did not have a TV set at home and was wary of reality shows, so the entire concept was quite unfamiliar to him. Nataša Dorčić, Medvešek's ex-wife both on-screen and in real life, remarked that The Show Must Go On gave them both a chance to play out "fighting" and "yelling", which were absent from their amicable real-life divorce.

The lack of funding affected the production, as the actors sometimes received their lines just before filming. In retrospect, Marasović felt that this ultimately made them the film's "weakest link".

The film's working title was 101. dan (The 101st Day), under which it was released in some international markets, including Japan.

== Release and reception ==
The Show Must Go On premiered at the 2010 Pula Film Festival, where it won four awards: Breza Award for the best film debut, Special Golden Arena for Special Effects, Golden Arena for Best Screenplay, and the Oktavijan Award, given out by the Croatian Society of Film Critics.

Jurica Pavičić, writing for Jutarnji list daily, summarized The Show Must Go On as a "good dystopia with unconvincing protagonists". He noted it was only the third science fiction film in the history of Croatian cinema, while still being produced with funds that would otherwise be insufficient even for a TV drama. Despite the low budget, he described the film as professionally produced, with "decent" CGI effects. Still, Pavičić found that the film does not give enough attention to its many characters, and that the relationship between Dogan and his ex-wife does not move beyond a "yuppie post-industrial family cliché".

Janko Heidl, a Croatian film critic writing for filmovi.hr website, welcomed The Show Must Go On as a "praiseworthy endeavor", listing the special effects and an "impressive" depiction of a future Zagreb as its main qualities, but felt that the film lacks a more detailed elaboration of its themes and plot directions.

Sven Mikulec, writing for FAK.hr website, praised the film's production and directing while criticizing the actors' performances and poor development of supporting characters, finally noting that Marasović's elan and audacity still made him "leave the theater smiling".
