= Daria Lorenci Flatz =

Croatian actress

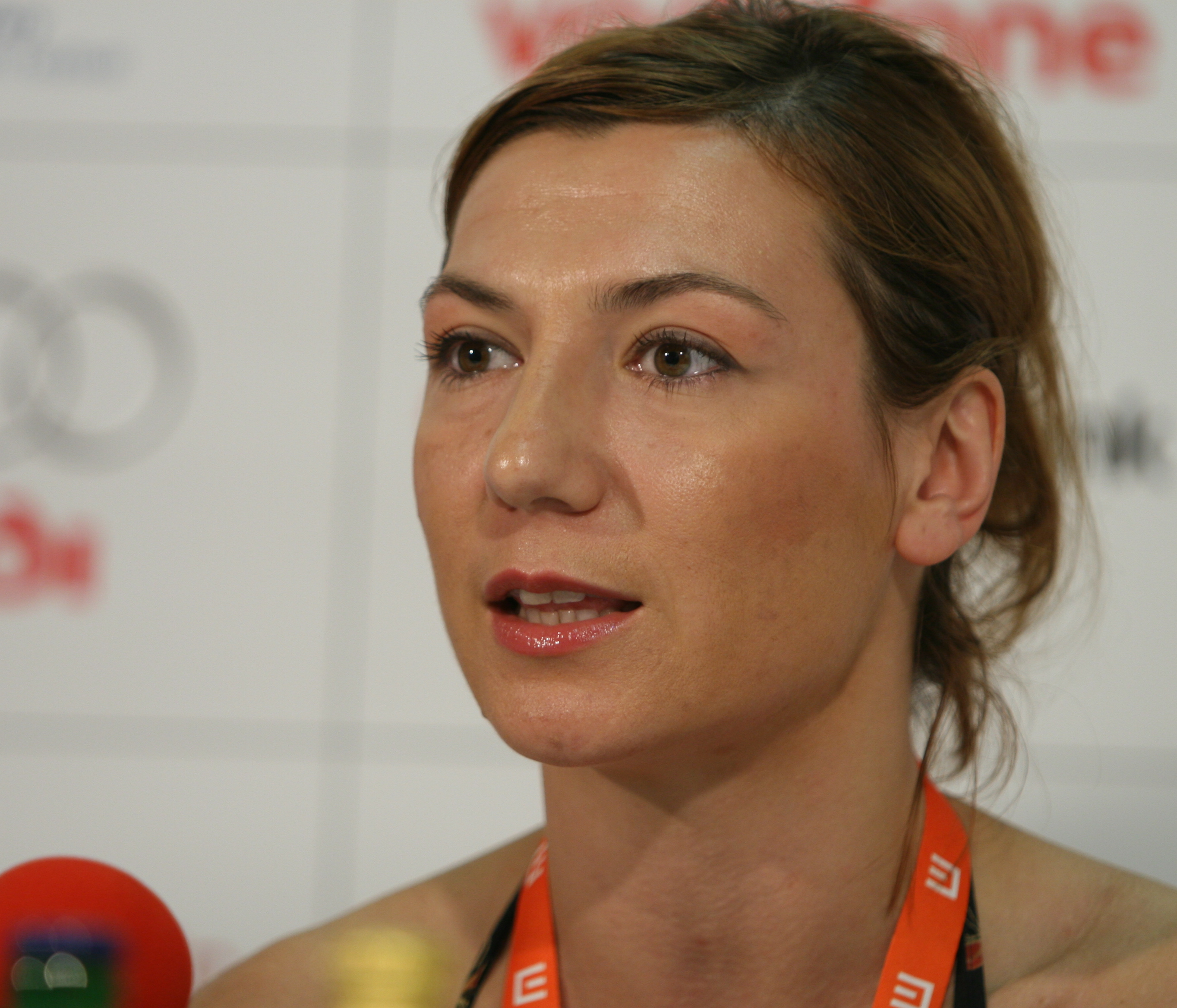
- Daria Lorenci Flatz in 2008
- Born: Daria Saltagić; 13 April 1976 (age 50); Sarajevo, SR Bosnia and Herzegovina, SFR Yugoslavia
- Occupation: Actress
- Years active: 2000–present
- Spouses: Jernej Lorenci (m. 1997–2000) Emil Flatz (m. 2009)
- Children: 3

Daria Lorenci Flatz (née Saltagić; born 13 April 1976) is a Bosnian-born Croatian television and film actress. She appeared in more than twenty feature films since 2000. She lives and works in Zagreb.

== Personal life ==
Daria Saltagić was born in Sarajevo to a Bosniak father and Bosnian Croat mother. Her father Emir Saltagić is a television director and her mother Danijela Turkalj is a documentarist. Emir and Danijela divorced a year before the Bosnian War broke out. Upon the outbreak of the war, Daria moved to Zagreb with her grandparents. She stated that the war outbreak made her suffer from anorexia. She is married to Emil Flatz. Together, they have three sons; twins Mak and Fran, and another son, Tin.

== Selected filmography ==
Film
Year	Title	Role	Notes
2012	Halima's Path	Rapka	
2012	Vegetarian Cannibal	Dr. Miller	
2010	Just Between Us	Anamarija	
2009	Metastases (film)	Milica	
2008	No One's Son	Marta	
2007	Teško je biti fin	Azra	
2005	Sex, Drink and Bloodshed	Police Officer	
2004	Sorry for Kung Fu	Mirjana	
2003	The One Who Will Stay Unnoticed		

TV
Year	Title	Role	Notes
2022–present	Kumovi	Jadranka Macan	600+ episodes
2020	Novine	Katarina Jerkov	10 episodes
2015	Počivali u miru	Franka Pavić	10 episodes
2008	Mamutica	Zrinka	1 episode
2007–2008	Lud, zbunjen, normalan	Vedrana	2 episodes
