= Gordana Gadžić =

Serbian actress

- Гордана Гаџић
- Born: 21 August 1955 (age 70); Belgrade, PR Serbia, FPR Yugoslavia
- Occupation: Actor
- Years active: 1981–present
- Spouse: Ivica Vidović (m. 1991; died 2011)
- Children: 2

Gordana Gadžić (Serbian Cyrillic: Гордана Гаџић; born 21 August 1955) is a Serbian actress. She has appeared in more, than 30 films since 1981.

== Biography ==
Gordana graduated in acting from the Faculty of Dramatic Arts in Belgrade, in the class of Professor Miroslav Minja Dedić. For her independent graduation thesis (Lady Macbeth), she was awarded as the best student of her generation. She has collaborated with almost all Belgrade theaters and appeared in approximately thirty films, several TV series, and TV dramas. In 1986, she received the Golden Arena for her role in the film Taiwan Canasta, directed by Goran Marković. Since 1992, she has been permanently residing in Zagreb, where she continues her artistic work. In 1998, she founded Teatar Rugantino, where she acts and produces.

She was married to the Croatian actor Ivica Vidović.

In memory of her late husband and great actor, she published the monograph Walking on the Edge, with Ivica, in which she documented the acting career of one of the most beloved actors from the region.

== Selected filmography ==
Year	Title	Role	Notes
2003	Horseman		
1997	Welcome to Sarajevo		
1990	Eagle		
1988	The Bizarre Country		
1987	Reflections		
1981	The Promising Boy		
