= Živko Anočić =

Croatian actor

- Born: 13 May 1981 (age 45); Osijek, SR Croatia, SFR Yugoslavia
- Occupation: Actor
- Years active: 2005-present

Živko Anočić (born 13 May 1981) is a Croatian male actor. He appeared in more than fifteen films since 2005.

== Filmography ==
=== Film ===
| Year | Title | Role | Notes |
|---|---|---|---|
| 2006 | Ne pitaj kako | Mali | |
| 2007 | Pusti me da spavam | Danko | |
| 2009 | Ljeto deset godina prije | Roko / Noa | |
| 2010 | 72 Days | Todor | |
| 2010 | Just Between Us | Nino | |
| 2011 | Zima | Mihael | |
| 2011 | Blurs | Igor "Igi" | |
| 2012 | Breza | Ivan, Hrvoje, Hamlet | |
| 2013 | 72 Days | Todor | |
| 2013 | Gospodin suza | Eugen | |
| 2013 | Zemlja meda | Roko "Čipo" Jurić | Short film |
| 2015 | Narodni heroj Ljiljan Vidić | Ivan Goran Kovačić | |
| 2015 | Zagrebačke priče vol. 3 | Kristijan | Segment: "Trešnjevka" |
| 2015 | Svinjari | Marin | |
| 2015 | Matija | Matija | Also producer |
| 2016 | Kreštavo | Gabrijel | Short film |
| 2016 | Orah | Martin | Short film |
| 2016 | Papar i sol | Petar Čakić | Television film |
| 2018 | Osmi povjerenik | Zorzi | |
| 2018 | Mali | Majić | |
| 2019 | Duboki rezovi | Father | |
| 2019 | Preporod | Ranko | Voice |
| 2019 | Smrt bijela kost | Gogo | |
| 2021 | Sixth Bus | TBA | |

=== Voice acting ===
| Year | Title | Role |
|---|---|---|
| 2005 | Bambi | Adult Thumper |
| 2006 | The Little Mermaid | The Seahorse Herald |
| 2006 | The Wild | Colin the Hyrax |
| 2006 | Garfield 2 | Nigel |
| 2007 | The Simpsons Movie | Groundskeeper Willie; Tre Cool; Captain McCallister; Barney Gumble |
| 2007 | Bee Movie | Bud Ditchwater; Buzzwell |
| 2007 | Shrek the Third | Wolf |
| 2008 | Bolt | Rhino |
| 2009 | Super Rhino | Rhino |
| 2009 | Up | Beta |
| 2011 | Rio | Armando |
| 2011 | Ice Age: A Mammoth Christmas | Prancer |
| 2012 | Ice Age: Continental Drift | Gupta |
| 2019 | Toy Story 4 | Forky |
