= Krešimir Mikić =

Croatian actor

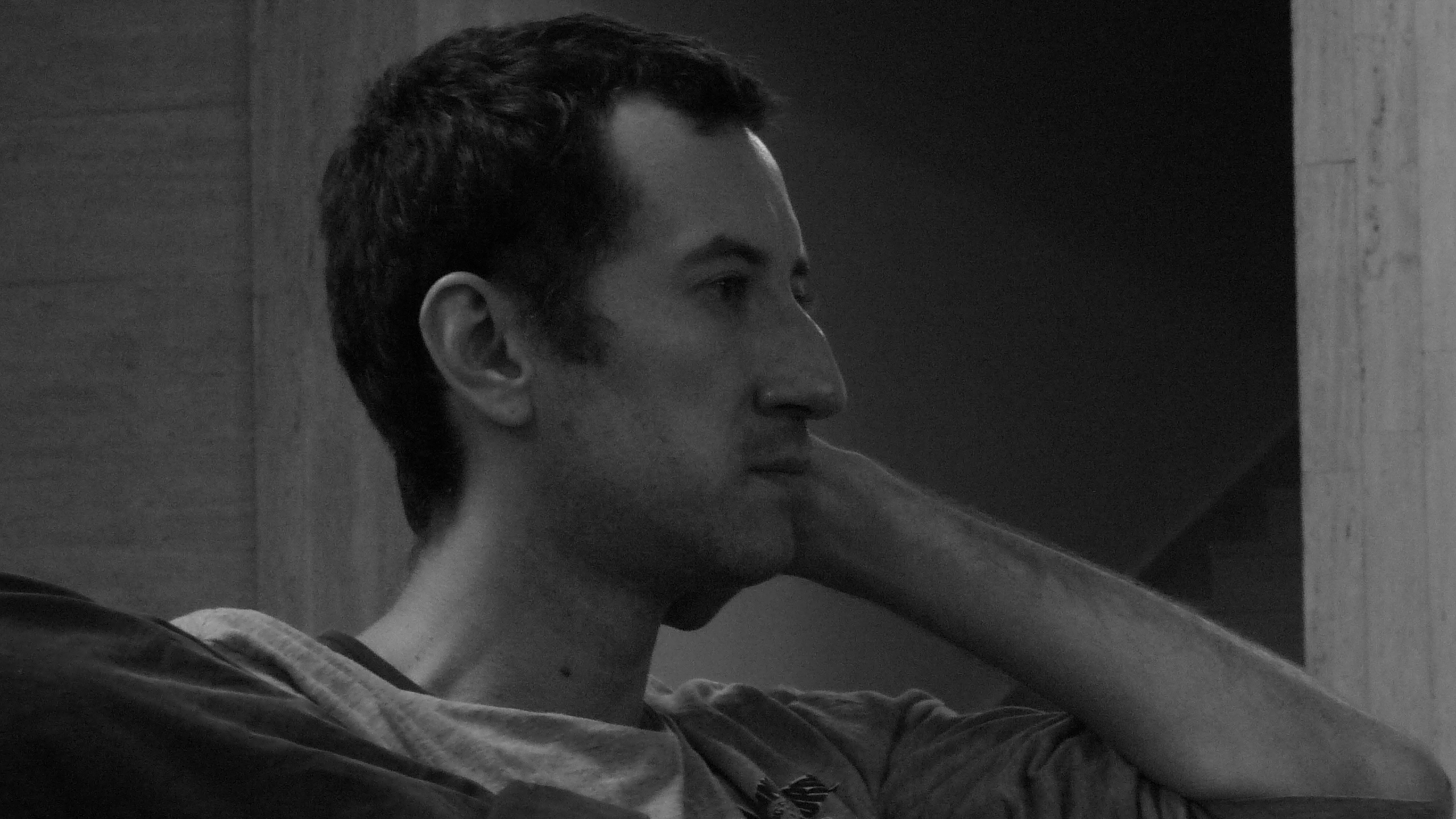
- Born: 17 April 1974 (age 52); Osijek, SR Croatia, SFR Yugoslavia (now Croatia)
- Education: Academy of Dramatic Art; University of Zagreb
- Occupation: Actor
- Years active: 1994–present

Krešimir Mikić (Croatian pronunciation: [krěʃimir mikiç]; born 17 April 1974) is a Croatian theatre and film actor. He is known for his roles in acclaimed feature films, including Zlatko in Sex, Drink and Bloodshed, Krešo in I Love You, Mirko in The Melon Route, and Don Fabijan in The Priest's Children.

On stage, he is known for his prominent activity in the Zagreb Youth Theatre and the Croatian National Theatre in Zagreb.

== Career ==
His acting in Dalibor Matanić's The Dawn was highly praised by critics.

== Selected filmography ==
- Fine Dead Girls (Fine mrtve djevojke) (2002)
- Witnesses (Svjedoci) (2003)
- The One Who Will Stay Unnoticed (Onaj koji će ostati neprimijećen) (2003)
- The Society of Jesus (Družba Isusova) (2004)
- Sex, Drink and Bloodshed (Seks, piće i krvoproliće) (2004)
- 100 Minutes of Glory (Sto minuta Slave) (2004)
- I Love You (Volim te) (2005)
- The Melon Route (Put lubenica) (2006)
- The Blacks (Crnci) (2009)
- 72 Days (Sedamdeset i dva dana) (2010)
- Vegetarian Cannibal (Ljudožder vegetarijanac) (2012)
- The Priest's Children (Svećenikova djeca) (2013)
- The Diary of Diana B. (Dnevnik Diane Budisavljević) (2019)
- The Dawn (Zora) (2020)
- The Last Roman God (Posljednji rimski bog) (2026)

== Awards ==
At the 27th International Small Scenes Theatre Festival Rijeka Mikić won the best male actor award for his role of Mr. Fulir in Rene Medvešek's play One song a day keeps mischief away.

In 2022, Mikić was nominated for best leading actor award at Sarajevo International Film Festival for his role in drama series The Last Socialist Artefact.
