= Leon Lučev =

Croatian actor

- Born: Leon Lučev; 1970 (age 55–56); Šibenik, SR Croatia, Yugoslavia
- Other name: Leo
- Occupation: Actor
- Years active: 1996–present
- Spouse: Ivana Jelavić (m. 2001; div. 2011)
- Children: 4
- Awards: Order of Danica Hrvatska

Leon Lučev (born 1970) is a Croatian actor.

== Career ==
He had his feature film debut in Vinko Brešan's 1996 comedy How the War Started on My Island. Since then, he has amassed lead roles in numerous high-profile European films, including Sex, Drink and Bloodshed (2004), What Is a Man Without a Moustache? (2005), Grbavica (2006), The Melon Route (2006), Behind the Glass (2008), On the Path (2010), Silent Sonata (2011), Vegetarian Cannibal (2012), The Miner (2017) and Men Don't Cry (2017).

Lučev won the Golden Arena for Best Supporting Actor at the 2008 Pula Film Festival, for his role in Will Not End Here. He was awarded the Heart of Sarajevo two times, for Buick Riviera in 2008 and The Load in 2018.

Apart from his film work, he regularly performs in the Croatian National Theatre in Rijeka. He provides the voice of Lightning McQueen in the Croatian dub of the Cars franchise (2006-2017) and voiced Nigel in the Croatian-language version of Finding Nemo (2003).

== Selected filmography ==
Film
Year	Title	Role	Notes
2001	Alone	unnamed man	
2004	Sex, Drink and Bloodshed	Roko Vitaljic	
2005	What Is a Man Without a Moustache?	Don Stipan / General Ivica	
2006	Grbavica	Pelda	
2006	The Melon Route	Seki	
2008	Will Not End Here	Martinov kolega	
2008	Behind the Glass	Nikola Jeren	
2008	Buick Riviera	Vuko	
2010	On the Path	Amar	
2011	Silent Sonata	Father	
2012	Cannibal Vegetarian	Ilija	
2013	Circles	Haris	
2016	The Black Pin	Savo	
2017	Men Don't Cry	Valentin	
2017	The Miner	Alija Basic	
2021	Murina	Ante	
2023	Disco Boy	Paul	
2025	How Come It's All Green Out Here?	Neven	The film is scheduled for premiere at KVIFF on 7 July 2025, competing for Proxima Grand Prix.
2026	Honey Bunny	Milan	

== Awards and nominations ==
Award	Year	Category	Nominated work	Result
Sarajevo Film Festival	2008	Heart of Sarajevo for Best Actor	Buick Riviera	Won
Sarajevo Film Festival	2018	Heart of Sarajevo for Best Actor	The Load	Won
Pula Film Festival	2011	Best Supporting Actor	Silent Sonata	Won
Locarno Festival	2018	Golden Pardino - Leopards of Tomorrow	I Can Barely Remember the Day	Nominated
