= Nevio Marasović =

Croatian film director and screenwriter (born 1983)

- Born: 7 July 1983 (age 42); Zagreb, SFR Yugoslavia
- Occupations: Film director, film producer, screenwriter
- Years active: 2003–present

Nevio Marasović (born 7 July 1983) is a Croatian film director, screenwriter, and a commercial director.

== Biography ==
Marasović made his first feature film called The Computer Repairment at the age of sixteen. He graduated from high school in 2002 and then studied film directing at the Academy of Dramatic Arts in Zagreb. In 2005 he made a ghost commercial “Durex Lunch” which won numerous awards at different advertising festivals. “Lunch” also became an Internet meme in the following years. Later on, Marasović shot over 150 TV commercials all over Europe.

Still being a student of the academy, in 2010 Marasović wrote and directed his feature film The Show Must Go On. The film became a break-through for the 24-year-old director, it received numerous awards such as Golden Arena for Best Screenplay, Golden Arena for the Best Special Effects, Best Newcomer award and the Critic's Choice Movie of the Year award at the Croatia's national film festival in Pula.

Also in 2010, Marasović made a TV comedy show called Instruktor for Croatia's RTL television. Along with a Croatian actor Stjepan Perić, Marasović was Instruktor's author and writer.

In 2013, he released Vis-à-Vis, a spontaneous and introspective indie movie about a director and actor. The film was screened at numerous international film festivals and received high critical acclaim. It won the Special Mention in the feature film competition at the 11th Zagreb Film Festival. The movie was also named one of the top five best European films of 2013 by Cineuropa.

In 2016, Marasović released dark comedy Goran. Its premiere took place at the 20th Fantasia International Film Festival. The movie was a result of collaboration with the Norwegian screenwriter Gjermund Gisvold, the setting is inspired by aesthetics of Frago. It won 6 awards, including Best Balkan Film at the International Film Festival in Priština.

In 2018, he released Comic Sans. It premiered at the 46th FEST in Belgrade and was screened at numerous world film festivals, winning many awards.

His next movie Good Times, Bad Times was released in 2023 and premiered at the 2023 Pula Film Festival.

== Filmography ==
- Autobiography (2003)
- Run (2009)
- The Show Must Go On (2010) feature film
- Instructor (2010) comedy show
- Vis-à-Vis (2013)
- Goran (2016)
- Comic Sans (2018)
- Good Times, Bad Times (2023)
