= Rakan Rushaidat =

Jordanian-born Croatian actor (born 1977)

- Born: 25 October 1977 (age 48); Irbid, Jordan
- Occupation: Actor
- Years active: 1998–present

Rakan Rushaidat (Arabic: راكان روشيدت; born 25 October 1977) is a Jordanian-born Croatian actor. He has starred in numerous commercially and critically acclaimed Croatian films, including Sex, Drink and Bloodshed (2003), The One Who Will Stay Unnoticed (2004), Metastases (2009), Vegetarian Cannibal (2012), A Stranger (2013) and Mali (2018).

== Selected filmography ==
Year	Title	Role	Notes
2013	A Stranger		
2013	Cowboys		
2012	Vegetarian Cannibal		
2011	The Little Gypsy Witch		
2009	Metastases		
2009	The Blacks		
2004	Sex, Drink and Bloodshed		
2003	The One Who Will Stay Unnoticed		
