= Bojan Navojec =

Croatian actor

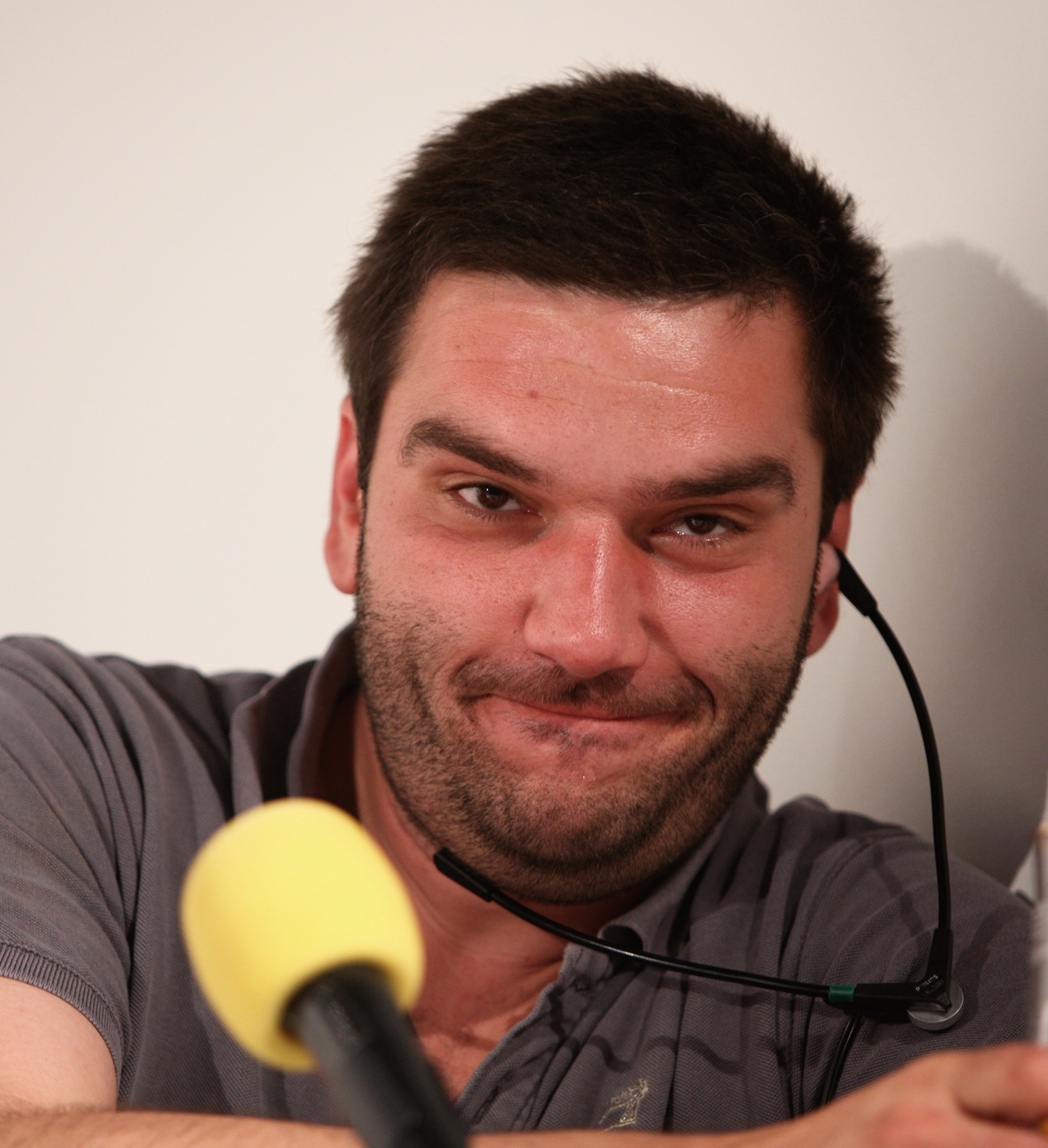
- Born: 26 April 1976 (age 48); Bjelovar, SR Croatia, SFR Yugoslavia
- Occupation: Actor
- Years active: 1997–present
- Height: 1.88 m (6 ft 2 in)

Bojan Navojec (born 26 April 1976) is a Croatian theatre and film actor.

Navojec was born in Bjelovar. He graduated from the Academy of Dramatic Art, University of Zagreb in 2010.

== Selected filmography ==
Film
Year	Title	Role	Notes
1999	Marshal Tito's Spirit		
2003	The One Who Will Stay Unnoticed		
2003	Witnesses		
2004	The Society of Jesus		
2004	Sex, Drink and Bloodshed		
2004	100 Minutes of Glory		
2005	I Love You		
2005	Pušća Bistra		
2006	All for Free		
2010	Just Between Us		
2011	Josef		
2012	Hives		
2012	Children of Sarajevo		
2013	Projections		
2016	A Good Wife		
