= List of Bosnian European Film Award winners and nominees =

This is a list of Bosnian European Film Award winners and nominees. This list details the performances of Bosnian actors, actresses, and films that have either been submitted or nominated for, or have won, a European Film Award.

== Main categories ==
Year	Award	Recipient	Status	Note
1997	Best Film	The Perfect Circle	Nominated	
1997	Best Screenwriter	Ademir Kenović, Abdulah Sidran for The Perfect Circle	Nominated	
2001	Best Screenwriter	Danis Tanović for No Man's Land	Won	
2001	Best Actor	Branko Đurić for No Man's Land	Nominated	
2002	Best Short Film	10 minutes	Won	
2003	European Discovery	Fuse	Nominated	Bosnian-Austrian-Turkish-French co-production
2005	Best Film	Grbavica: Esma's Secret	Nominated	Bosnian-Austrian-German-Croatian co-production
2005	Best Short Film	Prva plata	Nominated	
2008	European Discovery	Snow	Nominated	Bosnian-German-French-Iranian co-production
2008	Best Short Film	Tolerantia	Nominated	

    - Nominations - 8
    - Wins - 2

== See also ==
- List of Bosnian submissions for the Academy Award for Best Foreign Language Film
