= Naša mala klinika (Slovenian TV series) =

Slovenian comedy series

- Also known as: Our Little Clinic
- Genre: Sitcom; Satire
- Created by: Marko Pokorn; Branko Đurić
- Directed by: Branko Đurić; DWA
- Starring: Bojan Emeršič; Janez Hočevar; Rado Mulej; Lučka Počkaj; Tanja Ribič; Janez Škof; Sebastian Cavazza; Maša Derganc; Gojmir Lešnjak-Gojc; Jernej Šugman; Alenka Tetičkovič; Dario Varga; Jurij Zrnec
- Country of origin: Slovenia
- Original language: Slovenian
- No. of seasons: 7
- No. of episodes: 112

Production
- Executive producer: Matjaž Stražišar
- Camera setup: Single camera
- Running time: 40–45 minutes
- Production companies: Maska55 Production; Pro Plus

Original release
- Network: Pop TV
- Release: September 13, 2004 – December 10, 2007

Related
- Naša mala klinika (Croatia); Naša mala klinika (Serbia)

Naša mala klinika (Slovenian for 'Our Little Clinic') was a Slovenian comedy television series, which was broadcast for seven seasons by Pop TV from 2004 to 2007. The series was written by Marko Pokorn, Rok Vilčnik and Branko Đurić "Đuro", who also directed the series. The show won four (2005, 2006, 2007, 2008) viktors for the best played TV series.

The series was remade in Croatia under the same name, and ran on Nova TV from 2004 to 2006. The Serbian version, also titled Naša mala klinika aired from 2007 to 2011.

== Cast ==
The Slovenian cast:

Actor	Character	Occupation	Years (Seasons)
Bojan Emeršič	Dr. Jože Jarc	Surgeon	2004-2007 (1-7)
Janez Hočevar - Rifle	Dr. Leopold Krota	Anasthesist, Head doctor	2004-2007 (1-7)
Rado Mulej	Mile Car	Paramedic	2004-2007 (1-7)
Lučka Počkaj	Dr. Lili Muha	Dermatologist	2004-2005 (1-2)
Tanja Ribič	Magda Velepič	CEO	2004-2007 (1-7)
Janez Škof	Dr. Franci Ščinkovec	Internist	2004-2005 (1-2)
Jernej Šugman	Veso Lola Ribar	Reception, Security	2004-2007 (1-7)
Alenka Tetičkovič	Sestra Franja	Nurse	2004-2007 (1-7)
Dario Varga	Srečko Debevc	Patient	2004-2007 (1-7)
Jure Zrnec	Dr. Igor Muc	Not specialized doctor	2004-2007 (1-7)
Sebastian Cavazza	Dr. Boris Vrabec	Internist	2005-2007 (3-7)
Maša Derganc	Dr. Mila Sršen	Dermatologist	2005-2007 (3-7)
Gojmir Lešnjak-Gojc	Cvetko Vovk	Physiotherapist	2005-2007 (3-7)
Jaša Jamnik	Dr. Bogomir Moljka	Psychiatrist	2006-2007 (5-7)

== Episodes ==
=== Original Slovenian episodes ===
Season	Episodes	Originally released	
Season	Episodes	First released	Last released
1	12	September 13, 2004	November 29, 2004
2	18	February 14, 2005	June 13, 2005
3	14	September 12, 2005	December 12, 2005
4	18	February 13, 2006	June 12, 2006
5	16	September 4, 2006	December 18, 2006
6	19	February 12, 2007	June 18, 2007
7	15	September 3, 2007	December 10, 2007

=== Season 1 ===
No. overall	No. in season	Title	Directed by	Written by	Original release date
1	1	"Japanese patient" (Slovene: Japonski pacient)	Branko Đurić	Marko Pokorn, Branko Đurić	13 September 2004
2	2	"Clinic for hemorrhoids" (Slovene: Klinika za hemeroide)	Branko Đurić	Marko Pokorn, Branko Đurić	20 September 2004
3	3	"Elections" (Slovene: Volitve)	Branko Đurić	Marko Pokorn, Branko Đurić	27 September 2004
4	4	"Commissioner Rex" (Slovene: Komisar Reks)	Branko Đurić	Marko Pokorn, Branko Đurić	4 October 2004
5	5	"Body shop"	Branko Đurić	Marko Pokorn, Branko Đurić	11 October 2004
6	6	"Our baby" (Slovene: Naš dojenček)	Branko Đurić	Marko Pokorn, Branko Đurić	18 October 2004
7	7	"Ekshibicionist"	Branko Đurić	Marko Pokorn, Branko Đurić	25 October 2004
8	8	"Open day" (Slovene: Dan odprtih vrat)	Branko Đurić	Marko Pokorn, Branko Đurić	1 November 2004
9	9	"Fly from Spain" (Slovene: Muha iz Španije)	Branko Đurić	Marko Pokorn, Branko Đurić	8 November 2004
10	10	"Mushrooms" (Slovene: Gobe)	Branko Đurić	Marko Pokorn, Branko Đurić	15 November 2004
11	11	"Men's problems" (Slovene: Moške težave)	Branko Đurić	Marko Pokorn, Branko Đurić	22 November 2004
12	12	"Who?" (Slovene: Kdo?)	Branko Đurić	Marko Pokorn, Branko Đurić	29 November 2004

=== Season 2 ===
No. overall	No. in season	Title	Directed by	Written by	Original release date
13	1	"The cross and other problems" (Slovene: Križi in druge težave)	Branko Đurić	Marko Pokorn, Branko Đurić	14 February 2005
14	2	"Mr. bear" (Slovene: Gospod medved)	Branko Đurić	Marko Pokorn, Branko Đurić	21 February 2005
15	3	"Are you or are you not my girlfriend" (Slovene: Al si ti, al nisi moja punca)	Branko Đurić	Marko Pokorn, Branko Đurić	28 February 2005
16	4	"Franci returns" (Slovene: Franci se vrača)	Branko Đurić	Marko Pokorn, Branko Đurić	7 March 2005
17	5	"Wizard and other stories" (Slovene: Čarovnik in druge zgodbe)	Branko Đurić	Marko Pokorn, Branko Đurić	14 March 2005
18	6	"Bomb" (Slovene: Bomba)	Branko Đurić	Marko Pokorn, Branko Đurić	21 March 2005
19	7	"Financial inspector" (Slovene: Finančni inšpektor)	Branko Đurić	Marko Pokorn, Branko Đurić	28 March 2005
20	8	"Go daddy" (Slovene: Dajmo, očka)	Branko Đurić	Marko Pokorn, Branko Đurić	4 April 2005
21	9	"Veso's wedding" (Slovene: Vesova svatba)	Branko Đurić	Marko Pokorn, Branko Đurić	11 April 2005
22	10	"The new guard" (Slovene: Novi varnostnik)	Branko Đurić	Marko Pokorn, Branko Đurić	18 April 2005
23	11	"Our small alternative clinic" (Slovene: Naša mala alternativna klinika)	Branko Đurić	Miroslav Mandić	25 April 2005
24	12	"Kozmo"	Branko Đurić	Marko Pokorn, Branko Đurić	2 May 2005
25	13	"Sedmica"	Branko Đurić	Marko Pokorn, Branko Đurić	9 May 2005
26	14	"SARS"	Branko Đurić	Marko Pokorn, Branko Đurić	16 May 2005
27	15	"Kdor prdi, zlo ne misli"	Branko Đurić	Marko Pokorn, Branko Đurić	23 May 2005
28	16	"My kitten" (Slovene: Moj mucek)	Branko Đurić	Marko Pokorn, Branko Đurić	30 May 2005
29	17	"Our small nursery" (Slovene: Naša mala porodnišnica)	Branko Đurić	Marko Pokorn, Branko Đurić	6 June 2005
30	18	"Naša mala klinika, dok. oddaja"	Branko Đurić	Marko Pokorn, Branko Đurić	13 June 2005

=== Season 3 ===
No. overall	No. in season	Title	Directed by	Written by	Original release date
31	1	"Return cancellation" (Slovene: Vrnitev odpisanega)	DWA	Marko Pokorn, Branko Đurić	12 September 2005
32	2	"Syndrome terminator" (Slovene: Sindrom terminator)	DWA	Marko Pokorn, Branko Đurić	19 September 2005
33	3	"The bearded vulture" (Slovene: Brkati ser)	DWA	Marko Pokorn, Branko Đurić	26 September 2005
34	4	"Cuckold" (Slovene: Rogonosec)	DWA	Marko Pokorn, Branko Đurić	3 October 2005
35	5	"Cake" (Slovene: Torta)	DWA	Marko Pokorn, Branko Đurić, DWA	10 October 2005
36	6	"Tournament cleaning woman" (Slovene: Turnir snažilk)	DWA	Marko Pokorn, Branko Đurić, DWA	17 October 2005
37	7	"Makeover" (Slovene: Preobrazba)	DWA	Marko Pokorn	24 October 2005
38	8	"Oktoberfest"	DWA	Marko Pokorn	31 October 2005
39	9	"Sister sister" (Slovene: Sestrina sestra)	DWA	Branko Đurić	7 November 2005
40	10	"Replacement" (Slovene: Zamenjava)	DWA	Branko Đurić	14 November 2005
41	11	"Chimney sweep" (Slovene: Dimnikar)	DWA	Marko Pokorn	21 November 2005
42	12	"Wellness"	DWA	Marko Pokorn	28 November 2005
43	13	"Cousin of up" (Slovene: Bratranec od gor)	DWA	Marko Pokorn	5 December 2005
44	14	"Father Frost" (Slovene: Dedek Mraz)	DWA	Marko Pokorn	12 December 2005

=== Season 4 ===
No. overall	No. in season	Title	Directed by	Written by	Original release date
45	1	"Aliens" (Slovene: Vesoljci)	DWA	Rok Vilčnik, DWA	13 February 2006
46	2	"The carnival or happy day" (Slovene: Pust ali ta veseli dan)	Branko Đurić	Rok Vilčnik	20 February 2006
47	3	"Patient-friendly hospital" (Slovene: Bolniku prijazna bolnišnica)	DWA	Marko Pokorn	27 February 2006
48	4	"Piki"	DWA	Rok Vilčnik	6 March 2006
49	5	"Charity help" (Slovene: Dobrodelna pomoč)	DWA	Rok Vilčnik	13 March 2006
50	6	"Music video" (Slovene: Videospot)	DWA	Marko Pokorn	20 March 2006
51	7	"Elektrošok"	Branko Đurić, DWA	Branko Đurić	27 March 2006
52	8	"Dr. Spasojević"	Branko Đurić	Rok Vilčnik	3 April 2006
53	9	"Vampire" (Slovene: Vampir)	Branko Đurić	Rok Vilčnik	10 April 2006
54	10	"Our flesh of your flesh" (Slovene: Naše meso - vaše meso)	Branko Đurić, DWA	Branko Đurić	17 April 2006
55	11	"fortuneteller" (Slovene: Vedeževalec)	Branko Đurić	Marko Pokorn	24 April 2006
56	12	"Elastic Gonzo"	Branko Đurić	Rok Vilčnik	1 May 2006
57	13	"High Tech Clinique"	Branko Đurić	Branko Đurić	8 May 2006
58	14	"Zmago Batina"	Branko Đurić	Marko Pokorn	15 May 2006
59	15	"King funeral" (Slovene: Kralj pogrebov)	Branko Đurić, DWA	Rok Vilčnik	22 May 2006
60	16	"Smoke" (Slovene: Kadilec)	Branko Đurić	Marko Pokorn	29 May 2006
61	17	"Article" (Slovene: Članek)	Branko Đurić	Rok Vilčnik	5 June 2006
62	18	"Dokumentarna oddaja"	Klemen Dvornik	Klemen Dvornik	12 June 2006

=== Season 5 ===
No. overall	No. in season	Title	Directed by	Written by	Original release date
63	1	"Bar" (Slovene: Kantina)	Branko Đurić	Branko Đurić	4 September 2006
64	2	"Fobie" (Slovene: Fojba)	Branko Đurić	Marko Pokorn	11 September 2006
65	3	"Fiancee" (Slovene: Zaročenka)	Branko Đurić	Rok Vilčnik	18 September 2006
66	4	"Come silent and become a legend" (Slovene: Prišel je tiho in postal legenda)	Branko Đurić	Branko Đurić	25 September 2006
67	5	"White mouse" (Slovene: Bele miši)	Branko Đurić	Marko Pokorn	2 October 2006
68	6	"Buns, snake and much more" (Slovene: Žemljice, kača in še marsikaj)	Branko Đurić	Rok Vilčnik	9 October 2006
69	7	"Daliči code" (Slovene: Danilčijeva šifra)	Branko Đurić	Rok Vilčnik	16 October 2006
70	8	"Denationalization" (Slovene: Denacionalizacija)	Branko Đurić, DWA	Marko Pokorn	23 October 2006
71	9	"Carnivorous plants" (Slovene: Mesojeda rastlina)	Branko Đurić	Miha Mazzini	30 October 2006
72	10	"Police man" (Slovene: Policaj)	Branko Đurić	Rok Vilčnik	6 November 2006
73	11	"Professional patient" (Slovene: Profesionalni pacient)	Branko Đurić	Rok Vilčnik	13 November 2006
74	12	"Conveyor" (Slovene: Tekoči trak)	Branko Đurić, DWA	DWA	20 November 2006
75	13	"Patients come" (Slovene: Pacienti prihajajo)	Branko Đurić	Miroslav Mandić	27 November 2006
76	14	"White dress and gold teeth" (Slovene: Bela obleka in zlati zob)	Branko Đurić	Rok Vilčnik	4 December 2006
77	15	"Kupleraj"	Branko Đurić	Rok Vilčnik	11 December 2006
78	16	"Silvester"	Branko Đurić	Rok Vilčnik	18 December 2006

=== Season 6 ===
No. overall	No. in season	Title	Directed by	Written by	Original release date
79	1	"Presenečenje"	Branko Đurić, DWA	Rok Vilčnik	12 February 2007
80	2	"Skrita kamera"	Branko Đurić	Rok Vilčnik	19 February 2007
81	3	"Arabela"	Branko Đurić, DWA	Rok Vilčnik	26 February 2007
82	4	"Težave s posteljo"	Branko Đurić	Branko Đurić	5 March 2007
83	5	"Dolg"	Branko Đurić	Marko Pokorn	12 March 2007
84	6	"Štrajk"	Branko Đurić, DWA	Marko Pokorn	19 March 2007
85	7	"Nada Čokolada"	Miroslav Mandić	26 March 2007	
86	8	"NMK-tivi"	Branko Đurić, DWA	Marko Pokorn	2 April 2007
87	9	"Zobna miška"	Branko Đurić, DWA	Marko Pokorn	9 April 2007
88	10	"Alkimist"	Branko Đurić	Rok Vilčnik	16 April 2007
89	11	"Odškodnina"	Branko Đurić, DWA	Marko Pokorn	23 April 2007
90	12	"Čudežne kapljice"	Branko Đurić	DWA	30 April 2007
91	13	"Dve torbi"	Branko Đurić, DWA	Rok Vilčnik	7 May 2007
92	14	"Rubež"	Branko Đurić, DWA	DWA	14 May 2007
93	15	"Bratranec Poldi gre v klošter"	DWA	Rok Vilčnik	21 May 2007
94	16	"Lepa Vesna"	DWA	Rok Vilčnik	28 May 2007
95	17	"Legionela"	DWA	Marko Pokorn	4 June 2007
96	18	"Ugrabitev"	Branko Đurić, DWA	Branko Đurić	11 June 2007
97	19	"Dokumentarna oddaja"	Boris Gregurčič	nišče	18 June 2007

=== Season 7 ===
No. overall	No. in season	Title	Directed by	Written by	Original release date
98	1	"Fuzbal"	DWA	Rok Vilčnik	3 September 2007
99	2	"Pujs na Tromostovju"	DWA	Rok Vilčnik	10 September 2007
100	3	"Diktator Muc"	DWA	Rok Vilčnik	17 September 2007
101	4	"Patolog"	Branko Đurić, DWA	Marko Pokorn	24 September 2007
102	5	"Žleze pojejo"	DWA	Ranko Zidarić	1 October 2007
103	6	"Vse črno"	Branko Đurić, DWA	Rok Vilčnik	8 October 2007
104	7	"Plavalec in druge zgodbe"	DWA	Branko Đurić	15 October 2007
105	8	"Nič nas ne sme presenetiti"	DWA	Branko Đurić	22 October 2007
106	9	"Druga plat medalje"	DWA	Marko Pokorn	29 October 2007
107	10	"Laž ima kratke noge"	Branko Đurić, DWA	Rok Vilčnik, Marko Pokorn	5 November 2007
108	11	"Alkotest"	Branko Đurić, DWA	Rok Vilčnik	12 November 2007
109	12	"Šentviški mesar"	DWA	Marko Pokorn	19 November 2007
110	13	"Izganjalec zatičev"	Branko Đurić, DWA	Ranko Zidarić	26 November 2007
111	14	"Evrovizija"	Branko Đurić, DWA	Rok Vilčnik	3 December 2007
112	15	"Vse je bil hec"	Branko Đurić, DWA	Branko Đurić, Rene Bitorajac	10 December 2007

== Serbian version ==
The Serbian cast:

- Mladen Nelević - Sreten Pejević Pejo (Seasons 1-3)
- Rene Bitorajac - Dr. Veljko Zec (Seasons 1-3)
- Srdjan Miletić - Veselin Ribar Veso (Seasons 1-3)
- Miodrag Fiseković - Dr. Momčilo Šaranović Šaran (Seasons 1-3)
- Slobodan Ninković - Dr. Mirko Vrabac (Seasons 1-3)
- Boro Stjepanović - Dr. Jovan Guzina (Seasons 1-3)
- Sonja Damjanović - Sestra Mira (Seasons 1-3)
- Neda Arnerić - Sanja Popić (Seasons 1-3)
- Tanja Ribič - Dr. Lili Muha (Seasons 1-3)
- Svetislav Goncić - Cvetko Novak (Seasons 2-3)
- Erol Kadić - Lepomir Kralj (Seasons 2-3)

75 episodes

Sesone	Episode
1	37
2	21
3	17
