= Josip Pejaković =

Bosnian actor and writer (1948–2025)

- Born: 5 March 1948; Travnik, PR Bosnia and Herzegovina, FPR Yugoslavia
- Died: 18 July 2025 (aged 77); Sarajevo, Bosnia and Herzegovina
- Occupations: Actor; writer
- Years active: 1968–2025
- Spouse: Vesna Mašić

Josip Pejaković (5 March 1948 – 18 July 2025) was a Bosnian actor and writer. At one time he was the lead singer for the Travnik-based rock group Veziri. He was also an anti-war activist at the start of the Bosnian War. Pejaković was awarded the Sixth of April Sarajevo Award in 1975.

== Life and career ==
Pejaković was born in Travnik, PR Bosnia and Herzegovina, FPR Yugoslavia on 5 March 1948. He hosted a show on Bosnian television called "Josip Pejaković – U ime naroda" (Josip Pejaković – In the Name of the People). He was also a member of the advisory board of the left-wing magazine Novi Plamen.

Pejaković died in Sarajevo on 18 July 2025, at the age of 77. He was buried in Sarajevo five days later, at the Bare Cemetery on 23 July.

== Filmography ==
- Uvrijeđeni čovjek (1972)
- Papirna (1973)
- Odbornici (1975)
- Porobdžije (1976)
- Osma ofanziva (1979)
- Ukazanje Gospe u selu Grabovica (1982)
- Ljudski faktor (1981)
- Hasanaginica (1983)
- Vuk Karadžić (1988)
- Kuduz (1989)
- Silent Gunpowder (1990)
- Zamka Za Ptice (1991)
- The Perfect Circle (1997)
- All for Free (2006)
