= A Little Bit of Soul =

A Little Bit of Soul may refer to:

- "Little Bit O' Soul", a song written in 1964 by John Carter and Ken Lewis
- A Little Bit of Soul (1987 film), Bosnian film directed by Ademir Kenović
- A Little Bit of Soul (1998 film), an Australian film directed by Peter Duncan
