= Teater Paradižnik =

- Genre: comedy, sitcom
- Created by: Branko Đurić; Marko Pokorn
- Directed by: Branko Đurić
- Starring: Tanja Ribič; Janez Škof; Ivan Rupnik; Jernej Šugman; Gojmir Lešnjak
- Theme music composer: Marko Pokorn
- Composer: Saša Lošić
- Country of origin: Slovenia
- Original language: Slovene

Production
- Executive producer: Edo Brzin
- Production location: Ljubljana
- Running time: 55 minutes

Original release
- Network: TV Slovenia 1
- Release: 1994 – 1997

Teater Paradižnik (English: Paradižnik Theater; literally: Tomato Theater) is a Slovenian television comedy series, created and directed by Branko Đurić.

Screenplay was written by Marko Pokorn and Branko Đurić. This show lasted from 1994 to 1997 and was a huge hit in Slovenia. It was broadcast on first channel of RTV Slovenija, a Slovenian national television.

The story was set in theater. There was a lot of comic situations between workers behind the scenes; and a part on a stage with public and Slovenian music performances on the other side.

== Main characters ==
- Marijana (Tanja Ribič)...confused theater stage speaker
- Vinko (Janez Škof)...nervous theater show director
- Veso (Jernej Šugman)...chilled doorman from Bosnia, admissing all the guest and performers with his humor
- Hubert (Ivan Rupnik)...serious theater chairman with a bad breath
- Edwin (Jožef Ropoša)...gay wardrobe and make-up artist
- Scenci/Scene workers...group of crazy workers helping a director by setting stage sceneries
- Fani Mkombo (Metka Trdin)...cleaning lady
- Hinko (Gojmir Lešnjak)...funny fireman
- Plesalke Paradižnik/Paradižnik dancers...theater dancing girls
