= 10th European Film Awards =

1997 film awards ceremony in Germany

- Date: 7 December 1997
- Site: Flughafen Tempelhof, Berlin, Germany
- Hosted by: Tania Bryer
- Organized by: European Film Academy

Highlights
- Best Film: The Full Monty
- Best Actor: Bob Hoskins
- Best Actress: Juliette Binoche

The 10th European Film Awards were presented on 7 December 1997 in Berlin, Germany. The event was hosted by British television presenter Tania Bryer. The Space Dream performers gave a performance early ceremony. German actress Jasmin Tabatabai gave a performance mid-ceremony.

== Awards ==
=== European Actor of the Year ===
Bob Hoskins

=== European Actress of the Year ===
Juliette Binoche for her role in The English Patient

=== European Cinematographer of the Year ===
John Seale

=== European Achievement in World Cinema ===
Miloš Forman for The People vs. Larry Flynt. Forman was not present at the event but sent his thanks via video message.

=== Fassbinder Award ===
French director Bruno Dumont for La Vie de Jésus

=== European Screenwriter of the Year ===
Alain Berliner and Chris Vander Stappen for Ma vie en rose

=== European Film Academy Lifetime Achievement Award ===
Jeanne Moreau

=== Best Film ===
| English title | Original title | Director(s) | Country |
|---|---|---|---|
| The Full Monty | | Peter Cattaneo | United Kingdom |
| Captain Conan | Capitaine Conan | Bertrand Tavernier | France |
| The Fifth Element | Le Cinquième Élément | Luc Besson | France |
| The Perfect Circle | Savršeni krug | Ademir Kenović | Bosnia and Herzegovina |
| The English Patient | | Anthony Minghella | United States, United Kingdom |
| The Thief | Вор | Pavel Chukhrai | Russia |
