= Ranko Rihtman =

Bosnian pianist, composer, arranger, and conductor

- Born: 1948; Sarajevo
- Origin: Sarajevo
- Occupation(s): Pianist, composer, arranger and conductor
- Instrument: Piano

Ranko Rihtman (Sarajevo, 1948 (age 76–77)) is a Bosnian pianist, composer, arranger, and conductor.

== Education ==
Ranko Rihtman attended Sarajevo Music Academy, where he graduated at the Department of Ethnomusicology and Conducting, followed by attendance at the Berklee College of Music, in Boston, USA, in 1982 and 1983, where he completed professor Herb Pomeroy's Jazz Composition and Arranging class.

== Career ==
Since the 1960s, Rihtman played the organ and piano in several pop and rock bands, such as Čičci, Ambasadori, and most notably with Indexi, of whom he was a longtime member.

=== Conducting and cooperations ===
Between 1974 and 1992, Rihtman worked as a conductor of the Radio televizija Sarajevo Dance Orchestra, later Radio and Television of Bosnia and Herzegovina, usually conducting the orchestra for the Vaš Šlager Sezone Festival, held annually in Sarajevo. He arranged Eurovision Song Contest entry songs twice for Yugoslavia, both produced by Radio televizija Sarajevo, first in 1973 song Gori vatra, composed by Kemal Monteno, and sung by Zdravko Čolić and conducted by Esad Arnautalić, and in 1981, when Yugoslavia returned to the contest after a five-year-absence, he arranged and conducted Lejla, sung by Seid Memić Vajta.

From the 1970s, he worked as an arranger and conductor for various artists, such as Elda Viler, Zdravko Čolić, Ismeta Dervoz, Kemal Monteno, in pop music, and in rock music with Goran Bregović's Bijelo Dugme. In jazz he worked as a conductor and arranger with artists such as Duško Gojković, Gianni Basso, Bora Roković, Ladislav Fidri, Stjepko Gut, the Czech Radio Jazz Orchestra, Roberto Cittadini.

He also cooperated with various ensembles of classical, jazz and jazz-rock music, such as Sarajevo Philharmonic Orchestra, Sarajevo National Theatre and its Opera Orchestra, RTV Slovenia Symphony Orchestra, Saint Petersburg Glinka Orchestra.

When he moved to Israel in 1992, at the beginning of the Bosnian War, he worked at Israeli Radio and collaborated with a writer and screenwriter Đorđe Lebović on writing Yugoslavia in Four Movements, which was performed at the Kfar Blum Festival of Classical Music. In Israel he taught jazz harmony, arranging and piano, served as an academic advisor, and worked as the conductor of a professional Big Band and full-time arranger at the same college where he taught.

=== Film music ===
He has written music for film, TV, and theater. His work include Miris dunja, film by Mirza Idrizović in 1991, TV series and the movie Moj brat Aleksa in 1997, The Perfect Circle, film by Ademir Kenović, Jasmina, by Nedžad Begović, theater plays Woyzek, Hamlet, and other.

=== Bosnian anthem ===
He composed the first Bosnia and Herzegovina anthem as an independent state, Jedna si jedina, based on an old Bosnian folk song S One Strane Plive, which he arranged it in 1992, and is also the author of arrangements for the official version of the current national anthem, composed by Dušan Šestić in 1998.

=== Teaching ===
From 2016 to 2017 he was a lecturer at the Sarajevo Music Academy teaching a jazz harmony, arranging and piano . Since moving to Poreč, in 2015, he occasionally appeared on the Croatian music scene as an arranger. He held same position at the Hed College of Contemporary Music in Tel Aviv (most recently part of Ono - Academic College), after moving to Israel at the beginning of the Bosnian War in 1992, where he also served as an academic advisor.

== Private life ==
In 1992, at the beginning of the Bosnian War, Rihtman moved to Israel where he lived and continued his musical work until 2015. In 2015, Rihtman moved to Poreč, Istria, Croatia, where he currently resides.

== See also ==
- Music of Bosnia and Herzegovina
