= Tata i zetovi =

- Created by: Faruk Sokolović
- Written by: Hasan Džafić
- Directed by: Faruk Sokolović
- Starring: Boro Stjepanović; Mia Begović; Izudin Bajrović; Midhat Kušljugić; Žan Marolt; Mirvad Kurić; Ivo Gregurević; Tatjana Šojić; Faketa Salihbegović; Nikolina Đorđević; Meliha Fakić; Anita Memović; Emir Hadžihafizbegović; Dragan Bjelogrlić; Haris Burina; Dragan Marinković; Minka Muftić
- Theme music composer: Zlatko Pandur; Eldin Bihorac
- Countries of origin: Bosnia and Herzegovina
- No. of episodes: 26

Production
- Executive producer: Faruk Sokolović
- Producer: Šuhreta Duda Sokolović
- Production locations: Sarajevo, Bosnia and Herzegovina
- Running time: 30 minutes

Original release
- Network: BHT 1
- Release: 29 October 2006 – 19 April 2007

Tata i zetovi (English: Dad and the Sons-in-Law) was a Bosnian television sitcom.

The first episode of the show was aired on 29 October 2006. The final, 26th episode of the sitcom was aired on 19 April 2007.

== See also ==
- Top lista nadrealista
- Viza za budućnost
- Lud, zbunjen, normalan
- Memoari porodice Milić
