= Silent Gunpowder =

- Directed by: Bato Čengić
- Screenplay by: Bato Čengić
- Based on: Gluvi barut by Branko Ćopić
- Produced by: Mirza Pašić
- Starring: Mustafa Nadarević; Branislav Lečić; Fabijan Šovagović; Mira Furlan; Boro Stjepanović; Josip Pejaković; Zijah Sokolović
- Cinematography: Božidar Nikolić; Tomislav Pinter
- Edited by: Andrija Zafranović
- Music by: Goran Bregović
- Release date: 15 March 1990
- Running time: 116 minutes
- Country: Yugoslavia
- Language: Serbo-Croatian

Silent Gunpowder (Serbo-Croatian: Gluvi barut / Глуви барут) is a 1990 Yugoslav war film directed by Bato Čengić, starring Mustafa Nadarević, Branislav Lečić, Fabijan Šovagović, Mira Furlan, Boro Stjepanović and Josip Pejaković.

== Plot ==
Based on a novel by Branko Ćopić and set during World War II, the film tells the story of a Bosnian Serb village in the mountains of Bosnia and its villagers who found themselves divided along two opposing ideological lines in the face of the Axis invasion and subsequent occupation of the country, represented by the royalist Chetniks and the communist Partisans. These two opposing sides are personified in the Partisan commander nicknamed Španac (lit. "Spaniard", played by Mustafa Nadarević) and a former Royal Army officer Miloš Radekić (played by Branislav Lečić). Španac sees Radekić as the cause of villagers' resistance to the new communist ideology, and so the main plot revolves around the conflict between them.

== Cast ==
- Mustafa Nadarević as Španac
- Branislav Lečić as Miloš Radekić
- Fabijan Šovagović as Novak the Priest
- Mira Furlan as Janja
- Boro Stjepanović as Luka Kaljak
- Josip Pejaković as Trivun Drakulić the Duke
- Zaim Muzaferija as Stojan Kekić the Teacher
- Svetozar Cvetković as Zunzara
- Enver Petrovci as Uroš
- Radko Polič as Vlado the Commissioner
- Marko Nikolić as Mrki
- Milan Erak as Mlađen
- Milan Štrljić as Captain Rajić
- Zvonko Lepetić as Lazar
- Zijah Sokolović as Gojko the Miller

== Awards ==
- At the 1990 Pula Film Festival (the Yugoslavian version of the Academy Awards), the film won the Big Golden Arena for Best Film, as well as the awards for Best Actor in a Leading Role (Branislav Lečić), Best Film Score (Goran Bregović), and Best Makeup (Snježana Tomljenović).
- The film was also shown at the 17th Moscow International Film Festival, where both Branislav Lečić and Mustafa Nadarević won the Silver St. George Award for their performances.
