= Anžlovar =

Anžlovar is a Slovenian surname. Notable people with the surname include:

- Ivo Anžlovar (1915–1974), Slovenian opera singer
- Vinci Vogue Anžlovar (1963–2024), Slovenian film director
