= NMK =

NMK may refer to:

- Makura language, ISO 639-3 language code NMK
- Naša mala klinika, Balkan televised series
- National Museums of Kenya
- Newmarket (Suffolk) railway station, National Rail station code NMK
- NMK (company) (Nihon Maicom Kaihatsu), a Japanese video game developer
- North Macedonia, abbreviation used on their vehicle registration plates
