= TVSA =

Public TV channel in Sarajevo Canton, Bosnia and Herzegovina

TVSA HD
- Country: Bosnia and Herzegovina
- Headquarters: Sarajevo

Programming
- Language: Bosnian language
- Picture format: 16:9 1080i (HDTV)

Ownership
- Owner: JP "Televizija Kantona Sarajevo" d.o.o. Sarajevo
- Key people: Zlatko Topčić

History
- Launched: 1998

Links
- Website: www.tvsa.ba

Availability

Terrestrial
- Terrestrial signal: Territory of Sarajevo Canton

Streaming media
- TVSA Stream: www.tvsa.ba

Main building of TVSA located in Sarajevo. This building is also used by BHRT and RTVFBIH.

TVSA or Televizija Kantona Sarajevo (Sarajevo Canton Television) is a public TV channel founded by the Sarajevo Canton Assembly. The headquarters of TVSA are located in the capital city of Bosnia and Herzegovina, Sarajevo (along with national and entity level public broadcasters BHRT and RTVFBiH). Thanks to TV shows from its own production, TVSA became a recognizable and widely viewed TV station in Sarajevo. Their TV shows promote multiculturalism and specific culture, tradition and customs characteristic for the Sarajevo area and Bosnia and Herzegovina.

This television channel broadcasts a variety of programs such as news, talk shows, documentaries, sports, movies, mosaic, children's programs, etc.

Zlatko Topčić managed TVSA from 2013 to 2016.

== History ==
"Television Sarajevo" is the direct predecessor to today's Radio and Television of Bosnia and Herzegovina, a local television network broadcasting a TV channel in Bosnia and Herzegovina. The headquarters was in Sarajevo. Televizija Sarajevo was the first Bosnian-Herzegovinian television channel, when it debuted in 1961, although television service in Bosnia and Herzegovina had begun five years earlier.

== Programming ==
=== Series ===
- Karađoz (1969–1971), starring Momo and Uzeir.
- Top lista nadrealista (1984–1991)
- Memoari porodice Milić (1990–1991)

=== Films ===
- Husinska buna (1980)
- A Little Bit of Soul (1987)
