= Dubravka Ostojić =

Croatian actress

- Born: 19 June 1961 (age 64); Zagreb, PR Croatia, FPR Yugoslavia
- Occupation: Actress
- Years active: 1985–present
- Spouse: Ivan Vidić (m. 2019)

Dubravka Ostojić (pronounced [dûbraːʋka ôstojitɕ]; born 19 June 1961) is a Croatian actress.

== Filmography ==
"Zakon!" as Đurđa (2009)
"Naša mala klinika" as Sanja Grospić (2004-2007)
"Žutokljunac" as Terezija (2005)
"Osvajanja Ljudevita Posavca" as ? (2004)
"Naša kućica, naša slobodica" as ? (1999)
"Obiteljska stvar" as Maja Cvitan (1998)
"Smogovci" as Bongo's teacher (1991, 1997)
"Brisani prostor" as Sale's wife (1985)

== Personal ==
Ostojić was born, lives and works in Zagreb. She is married to Croatian author Ivan Vidić. Ostojić was previously in a relationship with Croatian actor Ivo Gregurević, with whom she had a son Marko, born in 1978.
