= Body Scent =

- Directed by: Živojin Pavlović
- Written by: Živojin Pavlović; Slobodan Golubović Leman
- Produced by: Dragoljub Vojnov
- Starring: Dušan Janičijević; Rade Šerbedžija; Metka Franko; Ljiljana Medješi; Zijah Sokolović
- Cinematography: Aleksandar Petković
- Edited by: Olga Skrigin
- Music by: Vartkes Baronijan
- Release date: 1983
- Running time: 99 minutes
- Country: Yugoslavia
- Language: Serbo-Croatian

Body Scent (Serbo-Croatian: Zadah tela), is a 1983 Yugoslav drama film directed by Živojin Pavlović.

It won four awards at the 1983 Pula Film Festival, including for Best Film, Best Screenplay (Živojin Pavlović and Slobodan Golubović Leman), Best Actress (Ljiljana Medješi) and Best Supporting Actor (Zijah Sokolović).
