= Rene Bitorajac =

Croatian actor (born 1972)

- Born: 2 March 1972 (age 54); Zagreb, SR Croatia, SFR Yugoslavia
- Occupations: Actor; director; screenwriter; TV host
- Years active: 1981–present
- Spouse: Ana Bitorajac

Rene Bitorajac (pronounced [reněː bitorǎːjat͡s]; born 2 March 1972) is a Croatian actor, director, screenwriter, and TV host. He earned acclaim for his dramatic and comedic roles in film and television. His notable film roles include the Academy Award-winning No Man's Land (2001), Metastases (2009) and Vegetarian Cannibal (2012). He won three Golden Arenas for Best Actor at the Pula Film Festival, as well as the Vladimir Nazor Award for Film Art.

On television, he notably starred in sitcoms Bitange i princeze (2005–2010) and Naša mala klinika (2004–2007), as well as hosted talent shows such as Supertalent (2009–2018) and Tvoje lice zvuči poznato (2014–2018).

== Career ==
He has appeared in several Croatian and Bosnian films since the 1980s. Most notably, he starred in the 2001 Academy Award-winning Bosnian film No Man's Land. He is also known for starring in popular Croatian television sitcoms Bitange i princeze (2005–2010) and Naša mala klinika (2004–2007).

Bitorajac won Golden Arena Awards for Best Actor for his portrayals of sociopathic football hooligan Krpa in the 2009 film Metastases, and Dr. Babić in the 2012 film Cannibal Vegetarian. His role in the latter earned him the Vladimir Nazor Award and the Paris Mediteraneo Gran Prix, among other accolades.

Bitorajac also worked prominently in Croatian-language versions of animated features. He provided voice acting for Syndrome in The Incredibles, Buck in Home on the Range (both 2004), Ham in Space Chimps (2008), Gru in the Despicable Me franchise (2010–present), and Red in The Angry Birds Movie (2016) complete with its 2019 sequel.

== Filmography ==
=== Film ===
Year	Title	Role	Director	Notes
1981	Visitors from the Arkana Galaxy	Targo	Dušan Vukotić	
1984	The Secret of an Old Attic	Adam	Vladimir Tadej	
1985	Anticasanova		Vladimir Tadej	
1990	A Summer to Remember	Gustav's friend	Bruno Gamulin	
1990	Death of a Schoolboy		Peter Patzak	
1993	A Time for...		Oja Kodar	
1994	Each Time We Part Away	The Educator (Joško)	Lukas Nola	
1995	See You	Kruno	Ivan Salaj	
1995	Letač Joe i Marija smjela	Friend	Saša Podgorelec	Short film
1996	How the War Started on My Island	The Albanian Soldier	Vinko Brešan	
1997	Russian Meat	The Inspector	Lukas Nola	
1998	The Three Men of Melita Žganjer	The Assistant Director	Snježana Tribuson	
1998	When the Dead Start Singing	Croatian Police Officer #1	Krsto Papić	
1998	Blues for Sara	Ismet	Boris Jurjaševič	
1999	Vendors of Good Fortune	Bobo Kumerle	Goran Kulenović	Short film
1999	Garcia		Dejan Šorak	
1999	Madonna	The Carpenter	Neven Hitrec	
2000	Celestial Body	The Commander	Lukas Nola	
2001	No Man's Land	Nino	Danis Tanović	
2001	Cats & Dogs	Butch	Lawrence Guterman	Croatian dub
2002	The Powerpuff Girls Movie	Mojo Jojo	Craig McCracken	Croatian dub
2002	24 Hours	Maki	Goran Kulenović and Kristijan Milić	
2003	Witnesses	The Albanian	Vinko Brešan	
2003	Cheese and Jam	Momo	Branko Đurić	
2004	Long Dark Night	The Speaker	Antun Vrdoljak	
2004	Home on the Range	Buck	Will Finn and John Sanford	Croatian dub
2004	The Incredibles	Buddy Pine / Syndrome	Brad Bird	Croatian dub
2006	Over the Hedge	RJ	Tim Johnson and Karey Kirkpatrick	Croatian dub
2006	Barnyard	Pig	Steve Oedekerk	Croatian dub
2008	Obituary for Escobar	Mileta	Milorad Milinković	
2008	Space Chimps	Ham III	Kirk DeMicco	Croatian dub
2008	Igor	Igor	Tony Leondis	Croatian dub
2009	Comrade Black in WWII	Hrvoje Budak	Rade Marković	
2009	Metastases	Krpa	Branko Schmidt	
2010	Despicable Me	Gru	Chris Renaud and Pierre Coffin	Croatian dub
2011	Gnomeo & Juliet	Fawn	Kelly Asbury	Croatian dub
2012	Vegetarian Cannibal	Dr. Danko Babić	Branko Schmidt	
2013	Despicable Me 2	Gru	Chris Renaud and Pierre Coffin	Croatian dub
2014	President Nixon's Present	Stipe Mrčela	Igor Šeregi	Short film
2015	Minions	Gru	Pierre Coffin and Kyle Balda	Croatian dub
2016	The Angry Birds Movie	Red	Clay Kaytis and Fergal Reilly	Croatian dub
2016	ZG80	Krpa	Igor Šeregi	
2017	Despicable Me 3	Gru	Pierre Coffin and Kyle Balda	Croatian dub
2017	The Nut Job 2: Nutty by Nature	Surly	Cal Brunker	Croatian dub
2019	The Last Serb in Croatia	DJ Mrkva	Predrag Ličina	
2019	General	The Instructor	Antun Vrdoljak	
2019	The Angry Birds Movie 2	Red	Thurop Van Orman	Croatian dub
2021	Fuji	Himself	Luka Hrgović and Dino Julius	Documentary short film
2021	Once We Were Good for You	Dinko	Branko Schmidt	
2022	Minions: The Rise of Gru	Gru	Kyle Balda	Croatian dub
2024	IF	Blue	John Krasinski	Croatian dub
2024	Despicable Me 4	Gru	Chris Renaud	Croatian dub
2026	The Wedding	Miljenko Lončarić	Igor Šeregi	
2026	The Golden Cut 42: Children of Kozara	Maks Luburić	Lordan Zafranović	
2028	The Wedding 2 †	Miljenko Lončarić	Igor Šeregi	Pre-production

=== Television ===
Year	Title	Role	Notes
1988	The Dirty Dozen	Marko	Episode: "Code Name – Romulus"
2004–2007	Naša mala klinika	Dr. Veljko Kunić	Croatian version; 110 episodes
2005	Duga mračna noć	The Speaker	Season 1, episode 3
2005–2010	Bitange i princeze	Robert "Robi" Kumerle	103 episodes (actor); 2 episodes (screenwriter)
2006–2007	Ples sa zvijezdama	Himself (contestant)	Season 1; runner-up
2007	Premijer	Prime Minister of Croatia	2 episodes
2007–2011	Naša mala klinika	Dr. Veljko Zec	Serbian version; 78 episodes
2008	Odmori se, zaslužio si	Robocop	Episode: "Bečka secesija"
2009	Zakon!	Captain Dragan	Episode: "Zavnoh!"
2009	Najveći hrvatski misteriji	Himself	Season 1, episode 3
2009–2018	Supertalent	Himself (host)	Talent show; seasons 1–6
2011–2012	Jadranske igre	Himself (host)	Game show
2012–2013	Volim Hrvatsku	Himself (team captain)	Game show; seasons 1–2
2013	Drug Crni u NOB-u	Hrvoje Budak	3 episodes
2014–2018	Tvoje lice zvuči poznato	Himself (host)	Reality competition show; seasons 1–5
2018	Ne diraj mi mamu	Budimir Ćorović	10 episodes
2019	General	The Instructor	2 episodes
2019	Ludi bar	Himself (host)	Game show
2021–2022	Ma lažeš!	Himself (host)	Game show; seasons 1–2
2021–2022	The Last Socialist Artefact	Oleg	Mini-series; 6 episodes
2022–2025	Metropolitanci	Petar Galić	26 episodes
