= Do You Remember Dolly Bell? =

- Directed by: Emir Kusturica
- Written by: Abdulah Sidran; Emir Kusturica
- Starring: Slavko Štimac; Slobodan Aligrudić; Ljiljana Blagojević; Mira Banjac
- Cinematography: Vilko Filač; Milenko Uherka
- Edited by: Senija Tičić
- Music by: Zoran Simjanović
- Distributed by: International Home Cinema (USA)
- Release date: 1981
- Running time: 106 minutes
- Country: SFR Yugoslavia
- Language: Bosnian

Do You Remember Dolly Bell? (Serbo-Croatian: Сјећаш ли се Доли Бел? / Sjećaš li se Doli Bel?) is a 1981 Yugoslav comedy-drama film directed by Emir Kusturica, in his feature film directorial debut. The screenplay is co-written by Abdulah Sidran and Kusturica, based on Sidran's 1979 novel of the same name. The film won the Silver Lion for Best First Work at the 38th Venice International Film Festival, and was selected as the Yugoslav entry for the Best Foreign Language Film at the 54th Academy Awards, but was not accepted as a nominee.

== Plot ==
Set over the 1963 summer in one of Sarajevo's neighbourhoods, the plot follows the fortunes of a school boy nicknamed Dino (Slavko Štimac) who grows up under the shadow of his good, but ailing, father. Simultaneous to being enthralled with a life that flashes before his eyes and ears in the local cinema and youth centre (where, among other things, he watches Alessandro Blasetti's European Nights and listens to Adriano Celentano's "24 Mila Baci"), Dino gets a taste of the world inhabited by local thugs and petty criminals. However, when he is rewarded via a liaison for providing a hiding place for prostitute "Dolly Bell" (Ljiljana Blagojević), his world is turned upside down as he falls in love with her.

== Cast ==
- Slavko Štimac - Dino
- Slobodan Aligrudić - Father
- Ljiljana Blagojević - Dolly Bell
- Mira Banjac - Mother
- Pavle Vuisić - Uncle
- Nada Pani - Aunt
- Boro Stjepanović - Cvikeraš
- Žika Ristić - Čiča
- Jasmin Celo
- Mirsad Zulić
- Ismet Delahmet
- Jovanka Paripović
- Mahir Imamović
- Zakira Stjepanović
- Tomislav Gelić
- Sanela Spahović
- Fahrudin Ahmetbegović
- Samir Ruznić
- Dragan Suvak
- Aleksandar Zurovac

== See also ==
- List of Yugoslavian films
- List of submissions to the 54th Academy Awards for Best Foreign Language Film
- List of Yugoslav submissions for the Academy Award for Best Foreign Language Film
