= Boris Miholjević =

Croatian actor

- Born: 24 July 1938 (age 87); Petrinja, Croatia
- Occupation: Actor
- Years active: 1963-present

Boris Miholjević (born 24 July 1938) is a Croatian theater, television and film actor. He appeared in more than seventy films since 1963.

== Selected filmography ==
Year	Title	Role	Notes
2005	First Class Thieves	Antoaneta	
2003	Infection	The Inspector	
2002	Fine Dead Girls	Perić the Gynecologist	
1998	When the Dead Start Singing	Dr. Lučić	
