= The Golden Cut 42: Children of Kozara =

- Serbian: Zlatni rez 42: Djeca Kozare
- Directed by: Lordan Zafranović
- Screenplay by: Arsen Diklić; Lordan Zafranović; Uroška Tatomir
- Produced by: Željko Joksimović; Zoran Janković; Uroška Tatomir; Miroslav Mogorović
- Starring: Miki Manojlović; Anica Dobra; Milan Marić; Leon Lučev; Rene Bitorajac; Irfan Mensur
- Cinematography: Goran Volarević
- Edited by: Milena Predić; Alfred Colombo
- Music by: Željko Joksimović
- Production companies: Minacord Production; Košutnjak Film; Netfilm; Film Center Serbia; Audio-Visual Center of Republika Srpska; TS Media; Art & Popcorn
- Release date: October 2, 2026 (FEST)
- Running time: 249 minutes
- Countries: Serbia; Bosnia and Herzegovina
- Languages: Serbian; Croatian

The Golden Cut 42: Children of Kozara (Serbian: Златни рез 42: Дјеца Козаре / Zlatni rez 42: Djeca Kozare) is a 2026 war drama film directed by Lordan Zafranović, based on a screenplay by Arsen Diklić, Zafranović, and Uroška Tatomir. A co-production of Serbia and Republika Srpska, the film premiered on 2 October 2026, opening the 53rd FEST in Belgrade.

== Premise ==
The film explores the theme of evil, taking inspiration from the true stories of the tens of thousands of children from the Kozara region who were taken to death camps during World War II in Yugoslavia—the only concentration camps for children in Europe, located in the fascist Independent State of Croatia (NDH).

The central plot follows the fate of three children, sister Zora and her two brothers, who fled from the fascists down the Dubica road with their mother in the summer of 1942. The mother and children, hungry and thirsty, escaped alongside hundreds of other refugees. The mother eventually ended up in the Ravensbrück concentration camp, while the children were sent to Collection Center No. 3, part of the Jasenovac concentration camp.

== Cast ==
Actor	Role
Leon Lučev	Bobinac
Milica Stanković	Zora
Vuk Trnavac	Baja
Miki Manojlović	Vukašin Mandrapa
Irfan Mensur	Doctor Bruner
Mina Sovtić	
Anica Dobra	Diana Budisavljević
Milan Marić	
Rene Bitorajac	Max
Werner Daehn	German colonel
Isidora Janković	
Milivoj Beader	Jasenovac camp commander
Bojan Navojec	Blaž Pavlek
Pavle Mensur	Žubrinić
Petar Benčina	
Dušanka Glid Stojanović	
Aleksej Bjelogrlić	Lovro
Miodrag Dragičević	Jurica
Milena Vasić	
Saša Joksimović	
Pavlina Radovanović	
Rade Maričić	
Tanasije Cakić	
Andrija Nikčević	
Đorđe Nikolić	
Nikola Brun	
Eva Ras	
Ljubomir Nikolić	Military cook
Sanja Marković	
Katarina Radivojević	
Veroljub Jeftić	
Marko Jeremić	Bobinac's driver
Batan Bogićević	Max's bodyguard
Nemanja Stanković	Mićko
Luka Antonijević	
Žarko Savić	Italian colonel
Mladen Prodan	Arnold Bach
Jadranka Nanić	Smiljka Miljuš
Katarina Gojković	Aunt (Strina)
Aneta Tomašević	
Nenad J. Popović	
Predrag Vasić	
Dejan Karlečik	
Gorica Popović	
Jelena Graovac	
Bora Nenić	
Hana Hegedušić	
Slobodan Milovanović	
Svetislav Marković	Second Ustashe drunkard
Danina Mogel	
Daniel Kovačević	
Ferid Karajica	
Branislav Ćalić	
Aleksa Tucakov	
Jack Dimić	
Spasoje Ž. Milovanović	German officer
Aleksandra Plahin	
Vladimir Tešović	Soldier translator
Aleksandar Stojić	Young Ustashe soldier
Jelica Kovačević	Dominican nun
Nikola Bošković	
Teodora Aleksić	Ustashe youth 1
Teodora Sparavalo	Ustashe youth 2

The ensemble cast also features appearances by Irfan Mensur, Anica Dobra, and Milan Marić.

== Historical background ==
During the 1942 Kozara Offensive, children from the Kozara region were forcibly taken to concentration camps in the NDH. Many children perished in Jasenovac and other camps, while a number of them were saved by Austrian humanitarian Diana Budisavljević. The film depicts these historical events through the personal tragedy of a single family.

== Production ==
=== Screenplay development ===
The idea to adapt this historical tragedy for the screen originated almost 40 years prior to its premiere. Writer and screenwriter Arsen Diklić and director Lordan Zafranović began working on the screenplay under the working title Children of Kozara (Deca Kozare) in 1986. The Yugoslav Wars in the 1990s halted the project. Decades later, Zafranović returned to Diklić's text and changed the film's title to The Golden Cut 42: Children of Kozara.

=== Filming ===
The film was produced by Minacord Production, in collaboration with Košutnjak Film, Netfilm, Film Center Serbia, the Audio-Visual Center of Republika Srpska, TS Media, and Art & Popcorn.

Principal photography began in July 2022. After a hiatus, filming resumed in May 2023 on locations across Serbia and Republika Srpska, lasting until the end of August 2023.

The shoot lasted for about 70 days in total. Zafranović and director of photography Goran Volarević stated they visually conceptualized the film to resemble "Renaissance paintings of evil". Young actors, including Milica Stanković and Vuk Trnavac, prepared for their roles by studying historical materials about the camp.

According to announcements following the wrap-up, the director stated that the film is dedicated to the victims of Ustashe crimes in the NDH.

=== Music ===
The film's musical score was composed by Željko Joksimović, who also serves as one of the film's producers.

== Release and reception ==
The film premiered on 2 October 2026, opening the 53rd FEST at the Sava Centar in Belgrade.

Tickets for the premiere were sold out. Director Emir Kusturica spoke positively about the film, emphasizing the importance of confronting history.

== See also ==
- Children of Kozara
- Jasenovac concentration camp
- Diana Budisavljević
- Kozara Offensive
