= Naša mala klinika =

Naša mala klinika may refer to:

- Naša mala klinika (Slovenian TV series)
- Naša mala klinika (Croatian TV series)
- Naša mala klinika (Serbian TV series), a Serbian version of series
