= Tanja Ribič =

Slovenian actress and singer (born 1968)

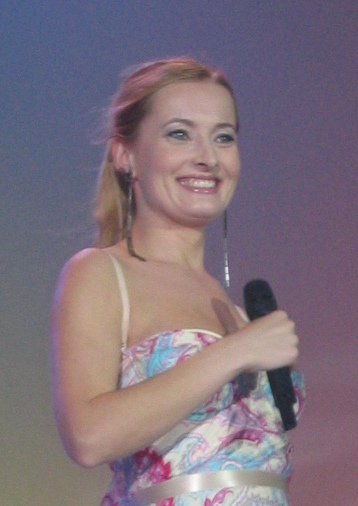
- Tanja Ribič, in 2004
- Born: 28 June 1968 (age 57); Trbovlje, SR Slovenia, Yugoslavia
- Occupations: Actress; singer
- Spouse: Branko Đurić (m. 2000)
- Website: www.tanjaribic.net (archive)

Tanja Ribič (born 28 June 1968) is a Slovenian actress and singer.

== Biography ==
Ribič graduated from the Academy of Theatre, Radio, Film and Television in Ljubljana. She has been a member of Ljubljana City Theatre since 1992.

She represented Slovenia in the Eurovision Song Contest 1997 with the song "Zbudi se", which finished tenth.

Her most noticeable role on television was when she played Magda Velepič in the Slovenian TV series Naša mala klinika.

In April 2009 Ribič and Branko Đurić acted in the movie Lunina prva noč, which was played in English language.

In 2014 she was a member of the jury in the TV show Znan obraz ima svoj glas.

== Personal life ==
She is married to actor and director Branko Đurić. The two are often portrayed in the Slovenian media as friends of Angelina Jolie and Brad Pitt.

== Movie roles ==
- 1990, Umetni raj – dir. Karpo Godina
- 1994, Halgato, as Iza
- 1994–1997, Teater Paradižnik, TV series, as Marjana Velepič
- 1996, Junaki petega razreda, as teacher
- 2000, Nepopisan list, as Jan's mother
- 2001, No Man's Land
- 2002, Kajmak in Marmelada, as Špela
- 2004–2007, Naša mala klinika, TV series, as Magda Velepič
- 2009, Lunina prva noč
- 2011, Traktor, ljubezen in rock′n′roll, as Silvija
- 2012, Hvala za Sunderland, as Sabina
- 2014, Dekleta ne jočejo
- 2014, Atomski zdesna, as Sonja
- 2014, Leaves of the tree, as nun

== Theater roles ==
- 1999, Pygmalion, Ljubljana City Theatre, as Eliza Doolittle
- 2001, Cyrano de Bergerac, Ljubljana City Theatre, as Roksana
- 2007, Ljudomrznik, Ljubljana City Theatre, as Celimena
- 2007, Zgodbe vsakdanje norosti, Ljubljana City Theatre, as Alice
- 2008, Tri sestre, Ljubljana City Theatre, as Irina
- 2008, Punce in pol, Ljubljana City Theatre, as Marlena
- 2009, Osli, Ljubljana City Theatre, as Kleareta
- 2011, Namišljeni bolnik, Ljubljana City Theatre, as Belina
- 2012, Čarovnice iz Eastwicka, Ljubljana City Theatre, as Alexandra Spofford
- 2013, Komedija z ženskami, Ljubljana City Theatre, as Hilde Prill

== Discography ==
=== Albums ===
- 1999, Ko vse utihne – "Waken now", "Midva bi lahko" and "Moja mala dlan"
- 2000, To je zdaj amore – "Roža", "100 solzic" and "Spomni se"

=== Songs ===
- "Zbudi se" (videospot)
- "Waken now"
- "Za vsako rano" (videospot)
- "Brez tebe ne bi" (videospot)
- "Julija" (videospot)
- "Simpatija"
- "Jablana"
- "Moja mala dlan"
- "Midva bi lahko"
- "100 solzic"
- "Spomni se"
- "Roža"
- "V dolini tihi" (videospot) (duet with Pero Lovšin)
- "Mambo italiano" (videospot)
- "Sinoči sem na vasi bil" (videospot) (duet with Saša Lošić)
- "Lajanje v luno"
- "Na božični večer"
- "Novoletni objem" (videospot)

Awards and achievements
| Preceded by Regina with "Dan najlepših sanj" | Slovenia in the Eurovision Song Contest; 1997 | Succeeded by Vili Resnik with "Naj bogovi slišijo" |
