= First Class Thieves =

- Directed by: Fadil Hadžić
- Written by: Fadil Hadžić
- Produced by: Jozo Patljak
- Starring: Goran Grgić; Emir Hadžihafizbegović; Mladen Vulić; Franjo Dijak; Boro Stjepanović
- Cinematography: Miodrag Trajković
- Edited by: Dubravko Slunjski
- Music by: Mate Matišić
- Production company: Alka film
- Release date: 20 July 2005
- Running time: 91 minutes
- Country: Croatia
- Language: Croatian

First Class Thieves (Croatian: Lopovi prve klase) is a Croatian comedy film directed by Fadil Hadžić. It was released in 2005.

== Cast ==
- Goran Grgić - Dramski Prvak
- Emir Hadžihafizbegović - Producent
- Mladen Vulić - Pacino
- Franjo Dijak - Glumac
- Boro Stjepanović - Upravitelj Zatvora
- Ksenija Marinković - Psihologica
- Marinko Prga - Guja
- Janko Rakos - Djoni Bomba
- Boris Miholjević - Antoaneta
- Božidar Smiljanić - Drzavni Lopov
- Predrag 'Predjo' Vusović - Placenik
- Zlatan Zuhrić-Zuhra - Vratar
- Katarina Bistrović-Darvas - Novinarka
- Danko Ljustina - Divlji kapitalista
- Vedran Mlikota - Policajac
- Vanda Božić - Veronika
