= See You (1995 film) =

- Vidimo se
- Directed by: Ivan Salaj
- Screenplay by: Ivan Salaj
- Starring: Nenad Cvetko; Goran Višnjić; Rene Bitorajac; Mislav Vilišić
- Cinematography: Vanja Černjul
- Production companies: Jadran Film; Croatian Radiotelevision; ADU
- Release date: 1995
- Running time: 70 minutes (65 minutes, according to some sources)
- Country: Croatia
- Language: Croatian

See You (Vidimo se) is a 1995 Croatian television film directed and written by Ivan Salaj, and starring Rene Bitorajac, Nenad Cvetko, Mislav Vilišić and Goran Višnjić. The film is about a group of childhood friends who reunite at the funeral of a mutual friend killed in a war. See You has gained a cult status among some Croatian film critics, and has been described as a "generational manifesto".

== Plot ==
In the summer of 1981, five boys – Maks, Mislav, Andre, Kruno and Borna – spend their time together playing in a forest, in an abandoned hut. One day their pet dog Afra is killed while fighting an unknown intruder. Saddened and angered, the boys bury the dog in the forest and promise they will all be buried next to him one day.

Ten years later, in the fall of 1991, Borna has been killed in combat in the Battle of Vukovar, and the four surviving friends reunite at his funeral. Since their childhood days, they have drifted apart: Maks is a member of a far-right paramilitary unit, Kruno went to Germany to attend college, Mislav is a heroin addict, and Andre seems to be completely uncertain about his future. The four friends have different attitudes about the war, which creates conflict among them. They are also troubled by their personal histories: Maks is heavily traumatized by his war experiences and is unable to adjust to civilian life, Mislav uses drugs as a way to escape the reality, and Kruno is apprehensive, worried that his leaving the country will be seen as desertion.

Remembering their childhood promise, they decide to dig up Borna's coffin from the cemetery and bury him in the forest. As the military police is setting a trap for Maks, the events take a dramatic turn...

== Cast ==
- Goran Višnjić as Maks
- Nenad Cvetko as Andrej
- Mislav Vilišić as Mislav
- Rene Bitorajac as Kruno
- Nadežda Perišić Nola as Dora
- Borna Krstulović as Borna

== Themes ==
See You has been described as "an account of a lost childhood and a rediscovered friendship". Its central theme is the loss of innocence, which is accentuated by the stark visual contrast between the warm, sunlit scenes of 1981, and dark and gloomy scenes that take place in the fall of 1991.

Salaj's pessimistic, even morbid outlook sharply diverges from an idealized depiction of the Croatian War of Independence, seen in some Croatian films of the era. Maks, ostensibly a war hero, is portrayed as a traumatized, broken man who is worthy of pity. Overpowered by the bleak reality of their existence, the protagonists rebel by clinging to an infantile childhood oath. At the same time, their differences and disagreements indicate a "schism within the Croatian society".

== Reception ==
See You was shown at the 1995 Pula Film Festival, where it received highly favorable reviews and won a special Arena award. Direction and cinematography were praised, as well as Goran Višnjić's "suggestive" portrayal of Maks, even if some generally criticized the acting as stilted.

See You was – with Zrinko Ogresta's Washed Out (1995) – described as the beginning of the "Croatian Black Wave", drawing parallels with bleak and pessimistic films of the 1960s Yugoslav Black Wave.

In a 2007 interview, Croatian film scholar Ante Peterlić singled out See You from the entire Croatian film production of the 1990s, saying that he "liked it very much". In a retrospective overview of the 1990s Croatian cinema, Nenad Polimac named See You the best Croatian war film of the decade.
