= Abdulah Sidran =

Bosnian writer (1944–2024)

Abdulah Sidran Абдулах Сидран
- Born: 2 October 1944 Sarajevo, Independent State of Croatia
- Died: 23 March 2024 (aged 79) Sarajevo, Bosnia and Herzegovina
- Occupation: Poet and screenwriter
- Genre: Poetry, prose, script

Abdulah Sidran (Serbo-Croatian Cyrillic: Абдулах Сидран; 2 October 1944 – 23 March 2024) was a Bosnian poet and screenwriter. He is considered to be one of the most influential writers in both Bosnia and Herzegovina and Yugoslavia.

Sidran is best known for writing the 1993 poetry book Sarajevski tabut ("The Coffin of Sarajevo"), as well as the scripts for Emir Kusturica's films Do You Remember Dolly Bell? (1981) and the Academy Award nominated When Father Was Away on Business (1985). He was a member of the Academy of Sciences and Arts of Bosnia and Herzegovina.

== Early life and family ==
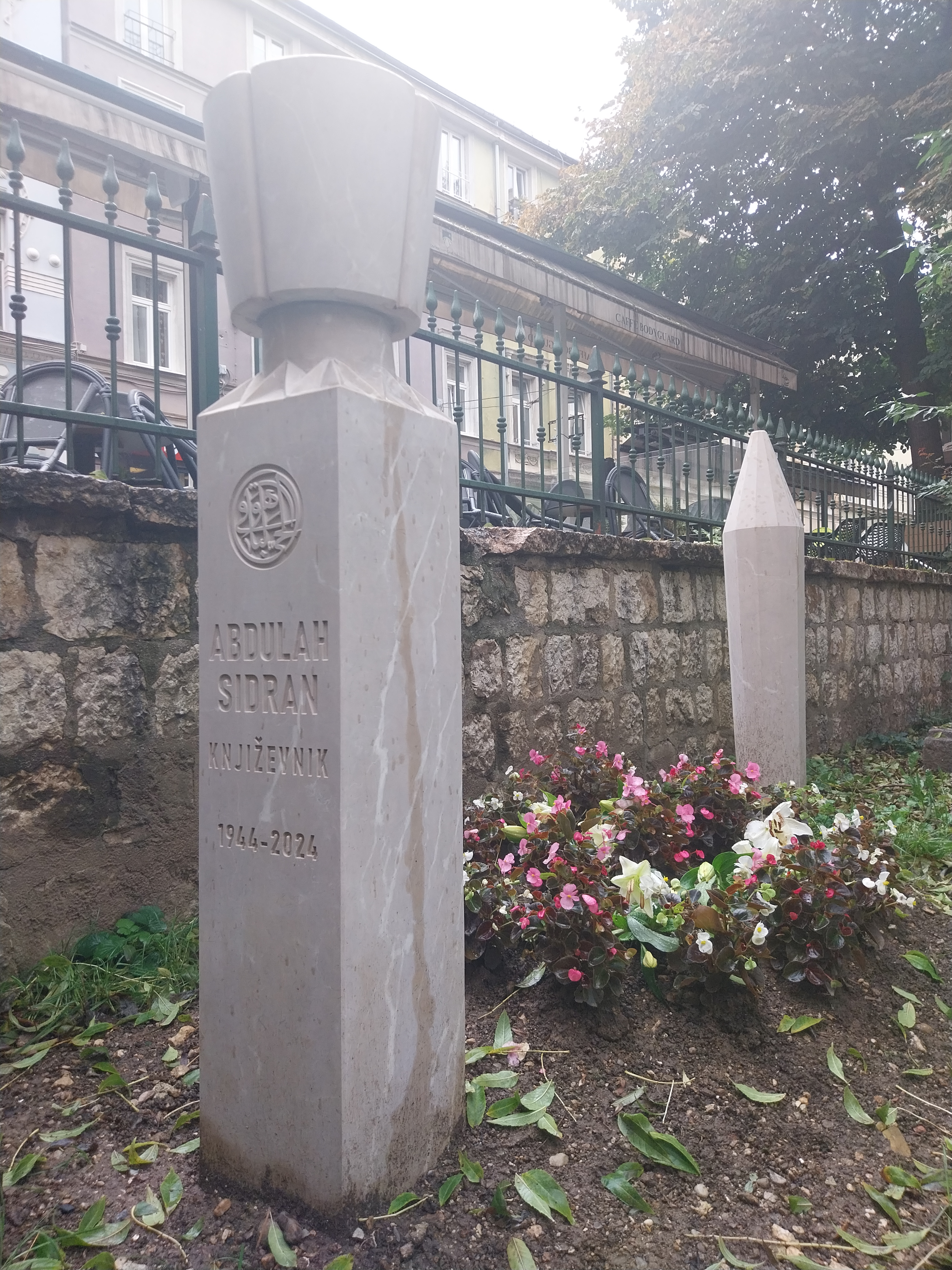
Sidran's grave in the courtyard of the Ferhadija Mosque in Sarajevo

Abdulah Sidran, the second of four children, was born in Sarajevo during World War II, on 2 October 1944. He was born to Bosniak parents; father Mehmed Sidran (1915–1965) was born in Kiseljak and worked as a locksmith at a railway workshop, while his mother Behija (née Jukić) was a housewife. Sidran had three siblings Ekrem (born 1942; deceased), Nedim (born 4 February 1947) and Edina (born 1953). He was named after his paternal uncle, a typographer and compositor, who perished in 1943 at the Jasenovac concentration camp. The Sidran family roots trace back to the hamlet Biograd near Nevesinje, Bosnia and Herzegovina. Abdulah's paternal grandfather Hasan Sidran relocated to Sarajevo from Belgrade in 1903.

== Personal life ==
After spending most of his life in Sarajevo, Sidran lived in Goražde before moving to a small village near Tešanj.

In 2019, Sidran, together with some thirty world intellectuals met with French president Emmanuel Macron. A meeting of world intellectuals with Macron was initiated by the prominent French philosopher, writer and journalist Bernard-Henri Lévy.

Sidran died in Sarajevo on 23 March 2024, at the age of 79 following a period of poor health. Shortly after, many prominent Bosnian politicians and public figures reacted to his death and offered their condolences. He was buried in the courtyard of the Ferhadija Mosque in Sarajevo on 27 March.

== Works ==
Major works of Sidran include Šahbaza, Bone and Meat (Kost i meso), The Sarajevo Tomb (Sarajevski tabut), Why is Venice Sinking (Zašto tone Venecija), several books of poetry, and screenplays for films from Yugoslavia, such as Do You Remember Dolly Bell? (1981) and When Father Was Away on Business (1985), directed by Emir Kusturica, and Kuduz (1989), directed by Ademir Kenović. When Father Was Away on Business was awarded a Palme d'Or at Cannes, and was nominated for an Academy Award for Best Foreign Language Film at the 58th Academy Awards.

=== Selected works ===
- Šahbaza (Sarajevo, 1970)
- Potukač (Zagreb, 1971)
- Kost i meso (Sarajevo, 1976)
- Dječija bolest: Otac na službenom putu: theater piece (Sarajevo, 1983),
- Otac na službenom putu: screenplay (Belgrade, 1985)
- Bolest od duše (Nikšić, 1988)
- Sarajevska zbirka, izabrane pjesme (Sarajevo, 1991)
- Sarajevski tabut (Sarajevo, 1993)
- Planeta Sarajevo (Stockholm, 1995)
- Zdravo Bosno, stižem iz Sarajeva: travelogue (Tuzla, 1996)
- Zašto tone Venecija (Sarajevo, 1996)
- Sarajevska zbirka i druge pjesme (Sarajevo, 1997)
- Sarajevska zbirka (Sarajevo, 1999)
- U Zvorniku ja sam ostavio svoje srce: theater piece (Tuzla, 2002)
- Kuduz, screenplay (Zenica, 2003)
- Sjećaš li se Doli Bel (Sarajevo, 2003)
- Tvrđava Meše Selimovića: dramatization and screenplay (Sarajevo, 2004)
- Izabrana djela 1-5 (Tuzla, 2004)
- Morija (Sarajevo, 2006),
- Pjesme poslije rata (Sarajevo, 2006),
- Izabrane pjesme (Belgrade, 2007),
- Dobročinitelj (with Mersad Berber, Sarajevo, 2008)
- Suze majki Srebrenice (Sarajevo, 2009),
- Otkup sirove kože (Belgrade, 2011),
- Oranje mora: journalistic texts (Sarajevo-Zagreb, 2016),
- A Nurija veli: journalistic texts (Sarajevo, 2021)

== Awards ==
=== Literary awards and recognitions ===
- Annual Award of the Writers' Association of Bosnia and Herzegovina (1979)
- Annual Award of the Svjetlost publishing company (1979)
- Jovan Jovanović Zmaj Award – Matica srpska (Novi Sad, 1980)
- Sixth of April Sarajevo Award (1986)
- Award for Freedom of Speech and Expression of the Foundation for Freedom of Speech and Expression, (US, 1993)
- Freedom Prize of the PEN Center of France (1994)
- Premio letterario della Fondazione Laboratorio Mediterraneo 1996.
- Skender Kulenović Award, 2002
- BZK Preporod Annual Award, 2002
- Bosanski stećak – Award of the Society of Writers of Bosnia and Herzegovina for life's work (2004)
- Premio letterario dedicato a Umberto Saba (Trieste 2005)
- Big Plaque of the Sarajevo Canton (2006)
- Muradif Ćato Award (2016)
- Ali Podrimja Award (2021)

=== Film awards and recognitions ===
- Golden Arena, Yugoslav film festival in Pula for the screenplay of the film Do You Remember Dolly Bell?
- Golden Arena, Yugoslav film festival in Pula for the screenplay of the When Father Was Away on Business
- Golden Arena, Yugoslav film festival in Pula for the screenplay of the Kuduz
- Vjekoslav Afrić Award, for contribution to Yugoslav cinematography
- Felix, award of the European Film Academy, for the film Kuduz
- Kaciga celjskog viteza, for the film The Perfect Circle
- Golden Lion of the Venice Film Festival for the film Do You Remember Dolly Bell?
- Palme d'Or, Cannes Film Festival, for the film When Father Was Away on Business
- Academy Award for Best Foreign Language Film nomination, for the film When Father Was Away on Business
