= Rok Vilčnik =

Slovene poet, playwright, dramaturge and writer

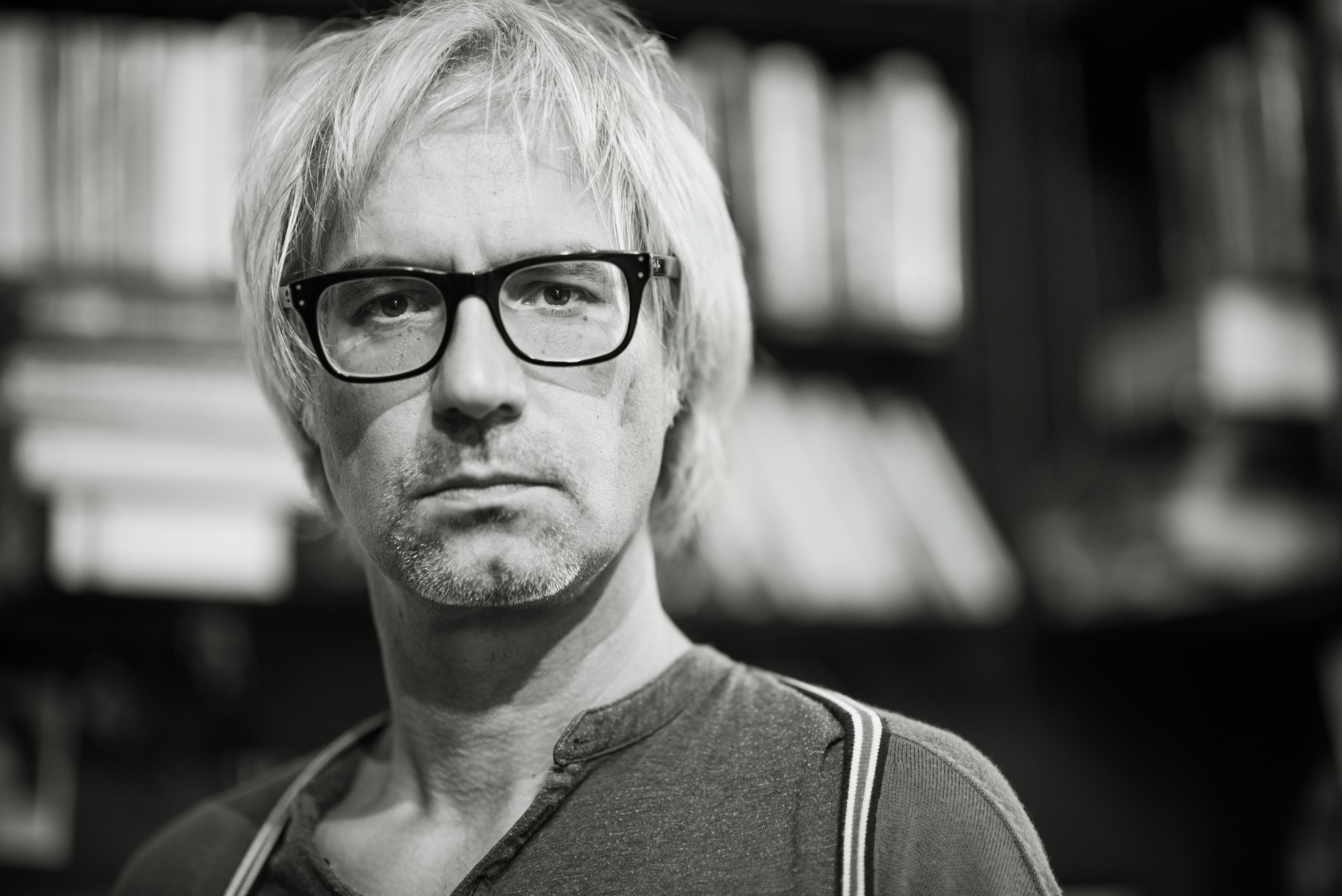
- Born: 18 April 1968 (age 57); Maribor, Slovenia
- Occupations: Writer, playwright, poet, songwriter, screenwriter
- Years active: 1994–present

Rok Vilčnik (born 1968 in Maribor, Slovenia), also known as rokgre, is a Slovene writer, playwright; poet, songwriter and screenwriter.

== Biography ==
He started his career as a painter and earned a BEd in fine arts. Due to a hand injury his career took a turn and he started writing. He has been a freelance artist ever since.
Vilčnik lives and works in Maribor, Slovenia.

== Works ==
He is mostly known for his theatrical plays for children and adults; he was three times awarded the Grum Award for best new Slovenian play. In 2000, he received it for To ("That"), in 2008 for Smeti na luni ("Garbage on the Moon"), and in 2016 for Ljudski demokratični cirkus Sakešvili ("The Sakeshvili Democratic People's Circus").

In 2004, at the Slovenian Festival of Monodrama in Ptuj, he was named the Slovenian Noble Comediographer and presented the Grand Prix for Pavlek ("Paulie"). In 2020 he was named Slovenian Noble Comediographer for the second time for Pravi heroji ("True Heroes").

Vilčnik also writes for TV, and he co-authored the popular television comedy series Naša mala klinika ("Our Little Clinic"), which has been broadcast in Slovenia, Croatia and Serbia. In addition, he was a script-writer for over 200 other TV plays, among them, Lepo je biti sosed ("Nice to be a Neighbour"), Trdoglavci ("Thickheads"), and Ena žlahtna štorija ("A Fine Story").

In 2014, he was recognized by the city of Maribor for his cultural achievements, particularly for his book of plays Ameriška trilogija ("American Trilogy"), with the Glazer Charter.

He is a founding member and songwriter for popular Slovenian bands Patetico, Papir and Pliš, and a songwriter for Neisha, Bilbi and Severa Gjurin. He is a frontman of the band Simpatico.

== Awards ==
- Grumova nagrada (Grum Award for best new Slovenian play) (2000, 2008 and 2016)
- Žlahtno komedijsko pero (Slovenian Noble Comediographer) (2004 and 2020)
- Glazerjeva listina (Glazer Charter) (2014)

== Bibliography ==
=== Theatre productions ===
- Zvezda (A Star)
- To (That)
- Kleščar (Thongsman)
- Enajsto čudo (The Eleventh Wonder)
- Leticija in Silvester (Laetitia and Sylvester)
- Blok (Tower Block)
- Milan (Milan)
- Mravljinčar ali gozd rdečih sadežev (Anteater or the Forrest of Red Fruit)
- Pavlek (Paulie)
- Othella (Othella)
- Kokolorek (Kokolorek)
- O čem govorimo, ko govorimo o ljubezni (What Do We Talk About When We Talk About Love)
- Serum resnice (Syrup of Truth)
- Bonton (Etiquette)
- Sirup sreče (Syrup of Happiness)
- Smeti na luni (Garbage on the Moon)
- Samohranilec (Single Parent)
- Mali priročnik biznisa (Little Guide for Business)
- Tarzan (Tarzan)
- Ljudski demokratični circus Sakešvili (The Sakeshvili Democratic People's Circus)
- Učinek kobilice (Grasshopper Effect)
- Gušto gre na romanje (Gušto's Pilgrimage)
- Tako ti je, mala (That's the Way it is, Darling)
- Večja od vseh (Biggest of All)
- Pošta (Post Office)
- Pravi heroji (True Heroes)

=== Published plays ===
- Kleščar (Thongsman) COBISS 52066561
- Ameriška trilogija (American Trilogy) COBISS 73838593
- Naše gledališče (Our Theatre) COBISS 4354139
- Vsakomur nekaj manjka (Short of Something) COBISS 95315201
- Drame: Tarzan, Ljudski demokratični cirkus Sakešvili, Naše gledališče (Plays: Tarzan, The Sakeshvili Democratic People's Circus, Our Theatre) COBISS 298962432

=== Radio drama ===
- Legenda o človeku (Legend about a Man)
- Dež (Rain)
- Kleistovo pismo (Kleist's Letter)

=== TV series ===
- Naša mala klinika (Our Little Clinic)
- Lepo je biti sosed (Nice to be a Neighbour)
- Trdoglavci (Thickheads)
- Ena žlahtna štorija (A Fine Story)
- Srečo kuha cmok (Cooking happiness)
- Gorske sanje (dialogs) (Mountain dreams)
- Črni Peter (Black Peter)
- Ja, Chef! (adaptation) (Yes, Chef!)

=== Poetry ===
- Sanje (Dreams)
- Pogrešanke (The Lost Poems)
- Zdravilo za Ano (The Cure for Ana)
- Šrapneli: poetični logaritmi (Shrapnels: Poetic Logarithms)

=== Novels ===
- Mali ali kdo si je življenje zmislo? (The Nipper, or Who Invented Life?)
- Deset let razmišljanja (Ten Years of Pondering)
- Človek s pogledom (A Man with a View)
- Sveti gozd (Holy Wood)

=== Children's literature ===
- Vesoljne pravljice (Universal Fairytales)
- Čombo, sončni kralj (Chombo the Sun King)
- Babica marmelada (Grandma Marmelade)
