= Naša mala klinika (Croatian TV series) =

- Genre: Comedy
- Based on: Naša mala klinika by: Marko Pokorn; Branko Đurić
- Written by: Marko Pokorn; Branko Đurić
- Directed by: Branko Đurić
- Starring: Igor Mešin; Enis Bešlagić; Goran Navojec; Ivica Vidović; Dubravka Ostojić; Ranko Zidarić; Bojana Gregorić Vejzović; Rene Bitorajac; Jadranka Đokić; Filip Šovagović; Damir Lončar; Filip Nola
- Country of origin: Croatia
- Original language: Croatian
- No. of seasons: 4
- No. of episodes: 112

Original release
- Network: Nova TV
- Release: 16 November 2004 – 18 December 2007

Related
- Naša mala klinika

Naša mala klinika (Croatian for 'Our Little Clinic') is a Croatian comedy television series based on the Slovenian series of the same name. The series is created by Branko Đurić.

The series ran on Nova TV from 2004 to 2007. It was later re-run on RTL Kockica.

== Premise ==
The series takes place in a small, financially struggling clinic where daily life is filled with humorous situations involving the medical staff, patients, and visitors. The strict rules imposed by the director Sanja Grospić shape the clinic’s chaotic routine, while the beloved porter and self‑proclaimed security guard Šemso serves as the key link between the clinic and the outside world. Under the leadership of chief physician Ante Guzina, the staff navigates professional duties, personal quirks, and close-knit friendships.

== Cast and characters ==
- Igor Mešin as Milan "Mile" Car
- Enis Bešlagić as Šemsudin Dino "Šemso" Poplava
- Ivica Vidović as Ante Guzina
- Rene Bitorajac as Veljko Kunić
- Dubravka Ostojić as Sanja Grospić
- Goran Navojec as Toni Grgeč
- Ranko Zidarić as Franjo Slaviček
- Jadranka Đokić as Helga
- Bojana Gregorić as Lili Štriga
- Damir Lončar as Florijan Gavran
- Filip Nola as Bogo Moljka
- Jos Zalokar
- Dženita Imamović as Anđa

== Episodes ==
112 episodes

Season	Episodes
1	30
2	32
3	35
4	15
