= Zijah Sokolović =

Bosnian actor, writer and director (born 1950)

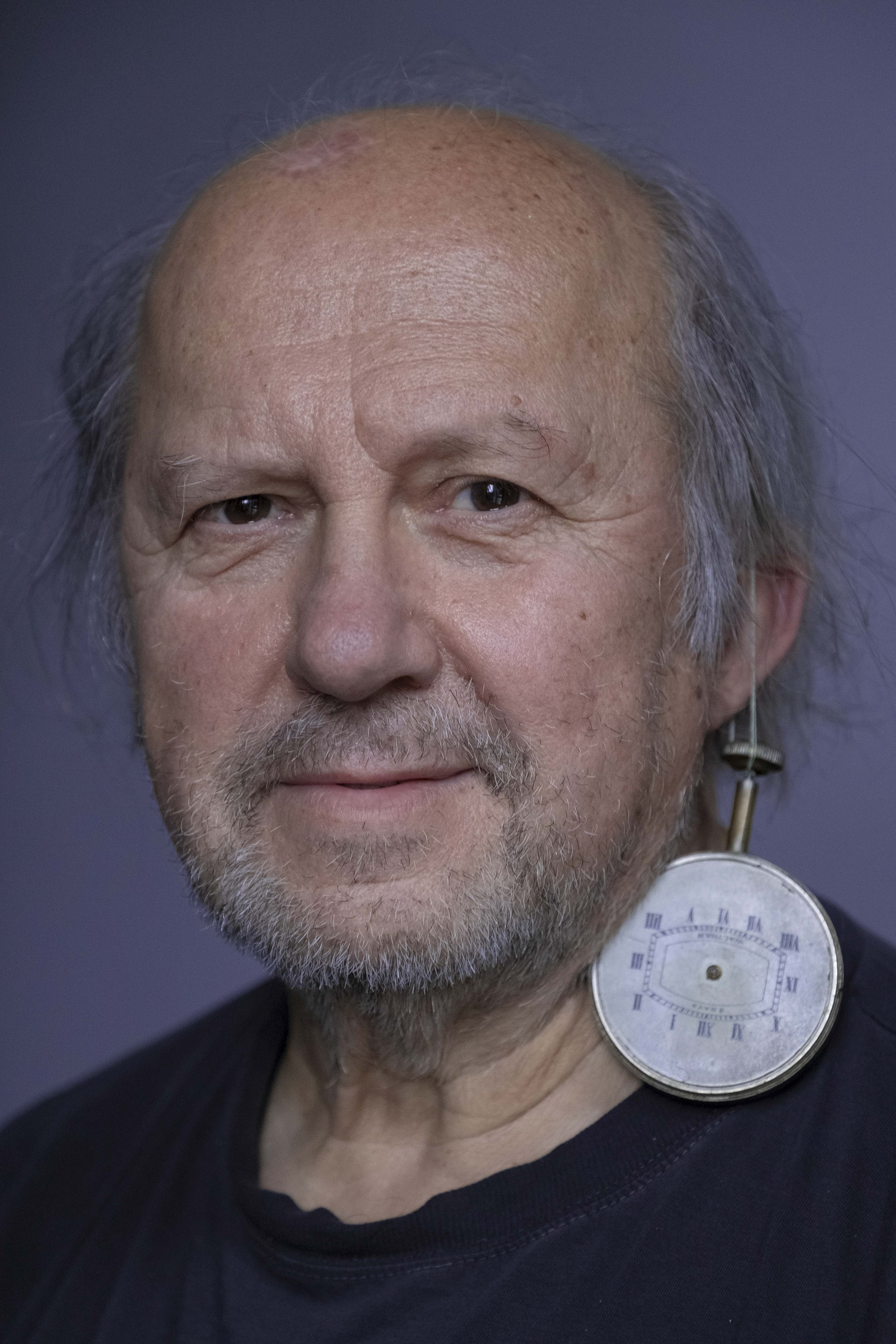
- Born: 22 December 1950 (age 75); Sarajevo, PR Bosnia and Herzegovina, FPR Yugoslavia
- Education: Academy of Performing Arts, Sarajevo
- Occupations: Actor; writer; director
- Years active: 1975–present
- Spouse: Lidija Stanković
- Children: 1

Zijah Sokolović (born 22 December 1950) is a Bosnian actor, writer and director. He is the director of Theaterland in Salzburg, professor at the Anton Bruckner Private University in Linz, artistic director of Dežela gledališča theatre in Ljubljana and artistic project leader for Dramatic society, Dramatično društvo, but also directs plays in Belgrade, Zagreb, Banja Luka and in his hometown of Sarajevo.

Sokolović appeared in numerous films, including multiple award-winning Yugoslav and Bosnian films Silent Gunpowder, Remake and The Abandoned. He also voiced Mr. Ping in the Serbian dub of the Kung Fu Panda franchise.

== Personal life ==
Sokolović is married to Lidija Stanković, and together they have a daughter named Hana Selena.

=== Health ===
On 9 November 2020, it was confirmed that Sokolović tested positive for COVID-19 and was sent to a hospital in Belgrade; by 11 November, he was let go to treat himself from home.

On 25 February 2021, he was admitted to a Banja Luka hospital because of heart problems. The next day, Sokolović was released from hospital and sent back home.

== Selected filmography ==
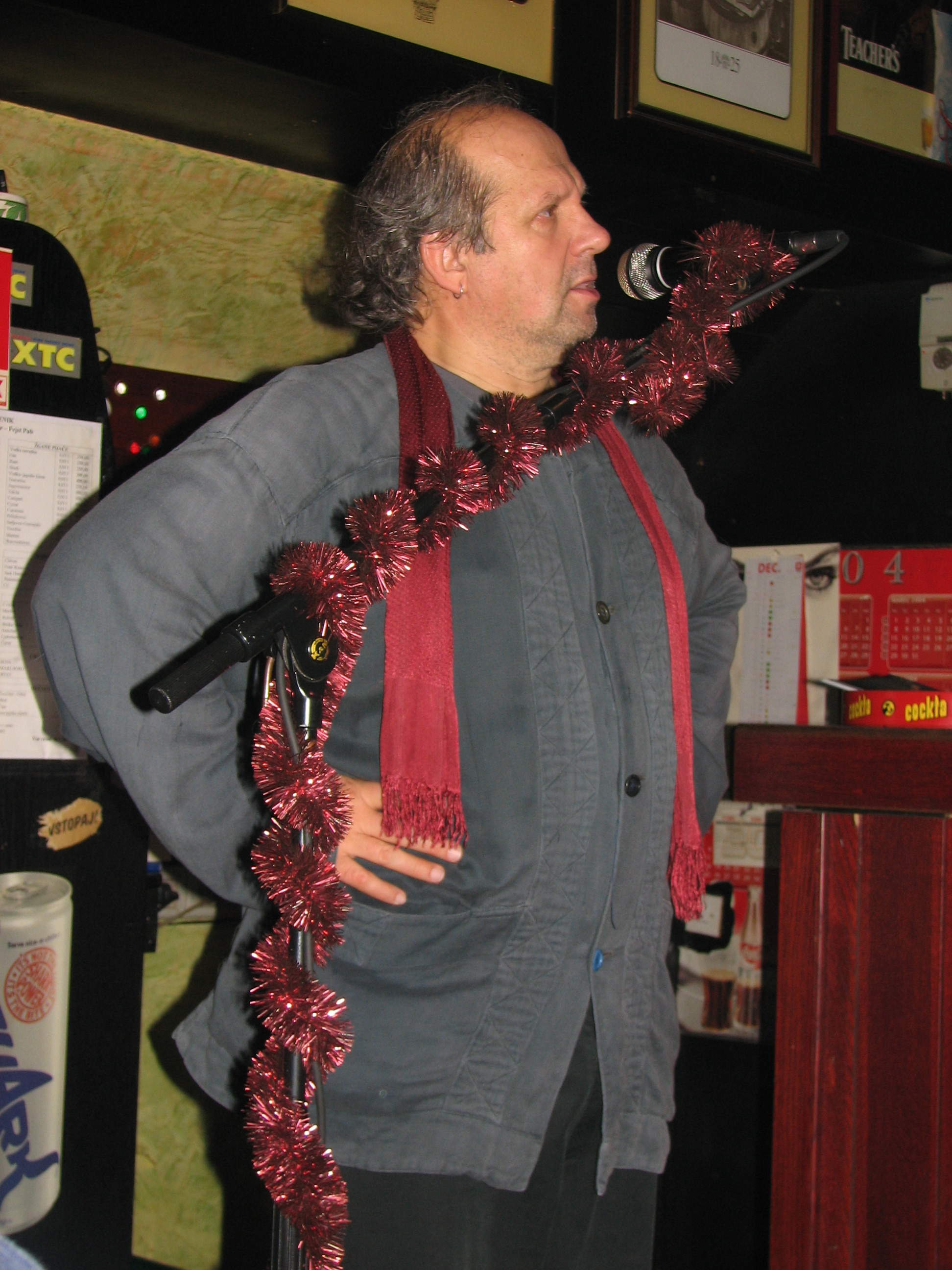
Sokolović performing in 2005

=== Film ===
Year	Title	Role
1975	Doktor Mladen	Huska
1981	You Love Only Once	Mirko
1982	The Smell of Quinces	Huso Mujagin
1983	Zadah tela	Panco's brother
1987	The Felons	Moše
1990	Silent Gunpowder	Gojko the Miller
1997	Outsider	Zastavnik Haris Mulahasanović
2003	Remake	Mirsad Alihodžić "Hodža"
2003	Horseman	Luda
2006	The Melon Route	Pauk
2010	The Abandoned	Muamer
2025	The Pavilion	It opened the 31st Sarajevo Film Festival

=== Television ===
Year	Title	Role
1990–1991	Memoari porodice Milić	Milan Milić
2005–2007	Ljubav, navika, panika	Mr Jovanović

=== Voice-over dubs ===
Year	Title	Role	Notes
2008	Kung Fu Panda	Mr. Ping	Serbian-language version
2011	Kung Fu Panda 2	Mr. Ping	Serbian-language version
2016	Kung Fu Panda 3	Mr. Ping	Serbian-language version

== Awards ==
Year	Award	Category	Nominated work	Result	Ref.
1983	Golden Arena	Best Supporting Actor	Zadah tela	Won	
