= A Little Bit of Soul (1987 film) =

A Little Bit of Soul Ovo malo duše
- Directed by: Ademir Kenović
- Written by: Ranko Božić
- Produced by: Senad Zvizdić
- Starring: Branko Đurić, Zaim Muzaferija, Boro Stjepanović, Saša Petrović
- Music by: Esad Arnautalić
- Distributed by: Televizija Sarajevo
- Release date: 16 February 1987
- Running time: 73 minutes
- Country: Yugoslavia (SR Bosnia and Herzegovina)
- Language: Bosnian

A Little Bit of Soul (Ovo malo duše) is a 1987 Bosnian television dramedy film written by Ranko Božić and directed by Ademir Kenović.

== Plot ==
A bitter coming-of-age story about a boy who grows up in a remote Bosnian village shortly after World War II.

== Cast ==
- Branko Đurić – Ibrahim
- Zaim Muzaferija – Jusuf
- Boro Stjepanović – Poštar/Mailman
- Snježana Sinovčić – Hanifa
- Saša Petrović – Latif
- Branka Bajić – Senada
- Davor Janjić – Nihad

== Production ==
A Little Bit of Soul was filmed in 1986.
