= Ines Fančović =

Bosnian actress

- Born: Ines Nikolić; 5 October 1925; Šibenik, Kingdom of Serbs, Croats and Slovenes
- Died: 21 August 2011 (aged 85); Sarajevo, Bosnia and Herzegovina
- Resting place: Bare Cemetery, Sarajevo
- Occupation: Actress
- Years active: 1960–2011

Ines Fančović (née Nikolić; 5 October 1925 – 21 August 2011) was a Bosnian actress of film, television and theater. She is best known for her role as Mare in the television series Velo misto and as Mara in Memoari porodice Milić.

== Early life ==
Born as Ines Nikolić in Šibenik, Croatia and grew up in Split.

== Career ==
She started her career in Split. Her best known role was as Mara in the television series Velo misto.

Fančović had roles in films such as The Perfect Circle, Welcome to Sarajevo (both 1997) and Cirkus Columbia (2010), among others.

== Personal life ==
She married Velo misto writer Miljenko Smoje and together they had a daughter, Nataša. Fančović was widowed in 1995.

Fančović moved to the Bosnian capital city Sarajevo in 1960 and remained there until her death. She was in the city throughout the entire Bosnian War and survived the Siege of Sarajevo.

She died at the age of 85 in August 2011 and was buried in the Bare Cemetery in Sarajevo.

== Filmography ==
=== Films ===
- Quo vadis Živorade (1968)
- Crows (1969)
- Deveto čudo na istoku (1972)
- Pjegava djevojka (1973)
- Ljubav i bijes (1978)
- Lost Homeland (1980)
- Defiant Delta (1980)
- Dvije polovine srca (1982)
- Kuduz (1989)
- Last Waltz in Sarajevo (1990)
- Bračna putovanja (1991)
- Magareće godine (1994)
- Welcome to Sarajevo (1997)
- The Perfect Circle (1997)
- Cirkus Columbia (2010)

=== Television ===
- Rođendan (1973)
- Odbornici (1975)
- Prijatelji (1975)
- Tale (1979)
- Jegulje putuju u Sargaško more (1979)
- Krojač za žene (1980)
- Velo misto (1980–81)
- Obična priča (1989)
- Čovjek koji je znao gdje je sjever a gdje jug (1989)
- Memoari porodice Milić (1990)
- Foliranti (2011–12)
