= Kuduz =

- Directed by: Ademir Kenović
- Written by: Abdulah Sidran, Ademir Kenović
- Produced by: Bakir Tanović
- Starring: Slobodan Ćustić; Snežana Bogdanović; Branko Đurić; Ivana Legin; Mustafa Nadarević
- Music by: Goran Bregović
- Distributed by: FRZ Bosna, Sarajevo, RTV Sarajevo
- Release date: 1989
- Running time: 105 minutes
- Country: Yugoslavia (SR Bosnia and Herzegovina)
- Language: Serbo-Croatian

Kuduz is a 1989 Yugoslavian drama film, set in SR Bosnia and Herzegovina written by Abdulah Sidran and Ademir Kenović, who also directed the film. It is based on the true story of the outlaw Junuz Kečo. The film was critically acclaimed and won more than 20 Yugoslavian awards.

== Plot ==
A petty criminal is released from prison and marries his girlfriend. He manages to live a life free from crime, poor but happy, until his new wife commits adultery, which leads him to murder her and her lover. He then escapes into the mountains and evades justice for years.

Kuduz takes place in the grim social setting of city outskirts. Badema, a seductive local girl, meets Bećir Kuduz who has just come out of prison. Neither the age difference nor the fact that Badema has a little girl of her own (without knowing who the father is) stops them from coming together, each with plans of their own. Kuduz dreams of starting up his own construction business, and Badema wants to work in a local cafe.

Badema seems light-hearted and is no homebody. Kuduz, meanwhile, is plagued by tragedy, torn by love, passion and jealousy. The two squabble and make up, then fight and split up only to return, and so the story unfolds until it reaches its tragic end. Behind this tragedy lies the love of two people who find each other: Kuduz and Badema's 5-year-old daughter Amela.

== Cast ==
- Slobodan Ćustić as Bećir Kuduz
- Snežana Bogdanović as Badema Kuduz
- Božidar Bunjevac as Salem Pilav
- Branko Đurić as Alija Goro
- Mustafa Nadarević as Police officer Šemso
- Ivana Legin as Amela, Badema's daughter
- Radmila Živković as Anđa
- Boro Stjepanović as Rudo
- Sena Mustajbašić
- Saša Petrović as Braco
- Amina Begović
- Haris Burina
- Zaim Muzaferija
- Ines Fančović (credited as Ines Fančević)
