= Memoari porodice Milić =

- Created by: Sulejman Kupusović
- Written by: Maja Đurić
- Directed by: Sulejman Kupusović
- Starring: Zijah Sokolović; Olivera Rajak; Etela Pardo; Milos Stojanović; Sabrina Sadiković; Ines Fančović
- Country of origin: SFR Yugoslavia
- Original language: Serbo-Croatian
- No. of seasons: 1
- No. of episodes: 20

Production
- Running time: 25 minutes

Original release
- Network: Televizija Sarajevo
- Release: 20 October 1990 – 2 March 1991

Memoari porodice Milić (Memoirs of the Milić Family) is a family sitcom that was first broadcast on Televizija Sarajevo from 20 October 1990 to 2 March 1991.

== Episodes ==
No.	Title	Directed by	Written by	Original release date
1	"Selo"	Sulejman Kupusović	Maja Đurić	20 October 1990
2	"Pušenje"	Sulejman Kupusović	Maja Đurić	27 October 1990
3	"Ljubav"	Sulejman Kupusović	Maja Đurić	3 November 1990
4	"Ozon"	Sulejman Kupusović	Maja Đurić	10 November 1990
5	"Boris"	Sulejman Kupusović	Maja Đurić	17 November 1990
6	"Sokrat"	Sulejman Kupusović	Maja Đurić	24 November 1990
7	"Rođendan"	Sulejman Kupusović	Maja Đurić	1 December 1990
8	"Rok zvijezda"	Sulejman Kupusović	Maja Đurić	8 December 1990
9	"Vanzemaljac"	Sulejman Kupusović	Maja Đurić	15 December 1990
10	"Maskenbal"	Sulejman Kupusović	Maja Đurić	22 December 1990
11	"Nesporazum"	Sulejman Kupusović	Maja Đurić	29 December 1990
12	"Ručak"	Sulejman Kupusović	Maja Đurić	5 January 1991
13	"Baka"	Sulejman Kupusović	Maja Đurić	12 January 1991
14	"Operacija"	Sulejman Kupusović	Maja Đurić	19 January 1991
15	"Krečenje"	Sulejman Kupusović	Maja Đurić	26 January 1991
16	"Karate"	Sulejman Kupusović	Maja Đurić	2 February 1991
17	"Operacija frižider"	Sulejman Kupusović	Maja Đurić	9 February 1991
18	"Beba"	Sulejman Kupusović	Maja Đurić	16 February 1991
19	"Kivi"	Sulejman Kupusović	Maja Đurić	23 February 1991
20	"Televizija"	Sulejman Kupusović	Maja Đurić	2 March 1991
