= No Man's Land (2001 film) =

War film by Danis Tanović

- Theatrical release poster
- Directed by: Danis Tanović
- Written by: Danis Tanović
- Produced by: Cédomir Kolar; Marc Baschet; Frédérique Dumas-Zajdela
- Starring: Branko Đurić; Rene Bitorajac; Filip Šovagović
- Cinematography: Walther Vanden Ende
- Edited by: Francesca Calvelli
- Music by: Danis Tanović
- Production companies: Fabrica; Man's Films; Studio Maj
- Distributed by: Océan Films (France); Rai Cinema (Italy); Momentum Pictures (United Kingdom)
- Release dates: 19 September 2001 (France); 28 September 2001 (Italy); 10 October 2001 (Belgium); 6 November 2001 (Slovenia); 17 May 2002 (United Kingdom)
- Running time: 98 minutes
- Countries: Bosnia and Herzegovina; France; Slovenia; United Kingdom; Belgium
- Languages: Bosnian; English; French; German
- Budget: €2 million
- Box office: $4.8 million

No Man's Land (Serbo-Croatian: Ničija zemlja, Ничија земља) is a 2001 war film that is set in the midst of the Bosnian War. The film is a parable and marks the debut of Bosnian writer and director Danis Tanović. It is a co-production among companies in Bosnia and Herzegovina, Slovenia, Italy, France, Belgium, and the United Kingdom. The film first premiered on 19 September 2001 in France. It later won an Oscar for Best Foreign Language Film in 2002.

== Plot ==
During the Bosnian War, two wounded soldiers, a Bosniak named Čiki and a Bosnian Serb named Nino, are caught between their lines in no man's land. The two soldiers confront each other in a trench, where they wait for dark. Trading insults at first, they eventually begin to find some common ground. Confounding the situation is another wounded Bosniak soldier named Cera who wakes from unconsciousness. A land mine has been buried beneath him by the Bosnian Serbs; should he make any move, the mine will explode.

A French Army sergeant named Marchand, of the United Nations Protection Force (UNPROFOR), gets involved in an effort to help the three trapped soldiers, despite initial orders to the contrary by high command. UNPROFOR's mission in Bosnia is to guard humanitarian aid convoys, remain neutral, and act as a mere bystander. Fortunately, a British reporter arrives on scene, bringing media pressure to bear that moves the UN high command to swing into action to try to save the soldiers.

A row between the stressed out and fatigued Čiki and Nino gradually escalates even after being rescued. Eventually, Čiki shoots Nino and in turn is shot by a UN Peacekeeper. Meanwhile, it is discovered that the mine underneath Cera cannot be defused. The UN high command tries to save face; they lie, saying that Cera has been saved and they leave the area, along with the reporters and everyone else.

In reality, Cera is left alone and desolate in the trenches, still immobilized by the mine. Meanwhile, the UN commander has arranged false information to be passed to both Bosnian and Serb forces, in order to make them believe that their enemies will be trying to reoccupy the trench at night (which each side would try to counter with an artillery barrage that will presumably kill Cera and destroy the evidence).

== Cast ==
- Branko Đurić as Čiki
- Rene Bitorajac as Nino
- Filip Šovagović as Cera
- Georges Siatidis as Sergeant Marchand
- Serge-Henri Valcke as Captain Dubois
- Sacha Kremer as Michel
- Alain Eloy as Pierre
- Mustafa Nadarević as older Serbian soldier
- Bogdan Diklić as Serbian officer
- Boro Stjepanović as Bosnian soldier
- Simon Callow as Colonel Soft
- Katrin Cartlidge as Jane Livingstone
- Tanja Ribič as Martha
- Branko Završan as Deminer
- Mirza Tanović as officer

== Release ==
4K Restored version of the film will be presented in the Open Air programme of the 32nd Sarajevo Film Festival as the closing film on 21 August 2026.

== Reception ==
=== Box office ===
The film had an estimated budget of €2,000,000. The film was a commercial success, earning $1,012,153 in the US & Canadian box office. In total, the film earned $4,858,869 worldwide.

=== Critical response ===
No Man's Land received positive reviews among critics and audiences. On review aggregator Rotten Tomatoes, the film holds a 93% approval rating based on 98 reviews, with an average rating of 7.80/10. The website's critics consensus reads, "Bleak and darkly humorous, No Man's Land vividly illustrates the absurdity of war." Metacritic, which uses a weighted average, has assigned the film a score of 84 out of 100 based on 29 critic reviews, indicating "universal acclaim". Prominent film critic Roger Ebert praised the film and cited it as a curiously beautiful film and rated 3.5 out of 4 stars.

== Other ==
The erroneous idea that a landmine goes off, not when you step on it but when you step off it, thus allowing to dramatically delay the explosion of a mine by keeping still, is a popular movie trope, commonly referred to as "Mine goes click".

== Accolades ==
Some of the awards that the film won included:

- Best Foreign Language Film, 2002 74th Academy Awards
- Best Foreign Language Film, 2002 59th Golden Globe Awards
- Best Screenplay Award, European Film Academy
- Best Screenplay, 2001 Cannes Film Festival

== See also ==
- Wicked Spring
