= Zaim Muzaferija =

Bosnian film, television and stage actor and poet

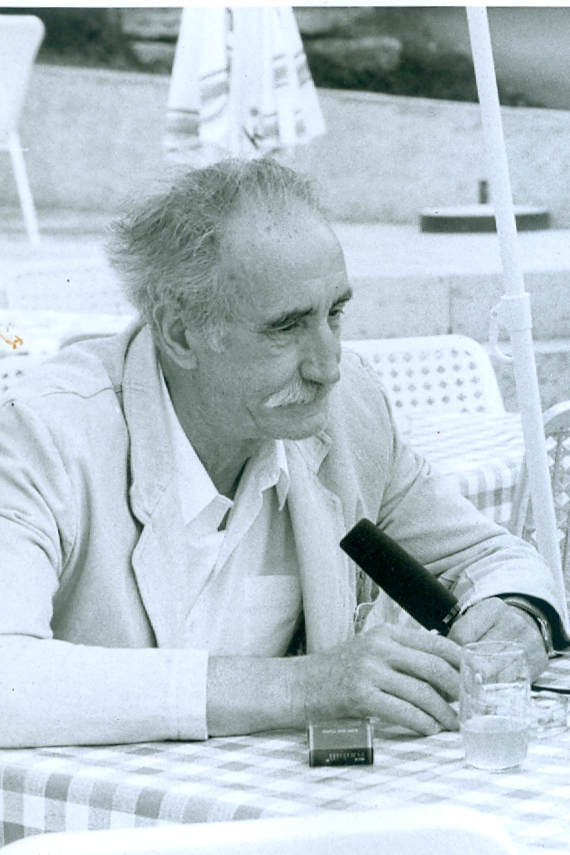
- Born: 9 March 1923; Visoko, Kingdom of Serbs, Croats, and Slovenes
- Died: 5 November 2003 (aged 80); Visoko, Bosnia and Herzegovina
- Occupations: Actor, poet
- Years active: 1961–2001

Zaim Muzaferija (9 March 1923 – 5 November 2003) was a Bosnian film, television and stage actor, and poet. The magazine 6yka (Buka) called Muzaferija a "legend of Bosnian cinema."

== Biography ==
During World War II, Muzaferija was arrested by NDH forces in 1942 along with a group of 36 anti-fascists. In his retirement he became a teacher of German and French.

Muzaferija became an actor when he was in his late 30s, his first film being Uzavreli grad (Boom Town), directed by Veljko Bulajić. The film premiered in February 1961.

== Death ==
Muzaferija died on 5 November 2003 after a long illness. He was buried in a Muslim funeral 7 November 2003.

== Filmography ==
=== Film ===
Year	Title	Role	Notes
1961	Uzavreli grad	Jefto Karanfil	English title: Boom Town
1962	Mačak pod šljemom	Kuvar	Uncredited
1964	Nikoletina Bursać		
1966	Glineni golub	Golijat	Credited as Zajim Muzaferija
1966	Sretni umiru dvaput	Stražar	
1967	Praznik	Starešina sela Nikola	English title: The Feast
1967	Djeca vojvode Šmita		
1967	Kaja, ubit ću te!	Kajo Sicilijani	English title: Kaya
1967	Mali vojnici	Airport Cop	English title: Playing Soldiers
1967	Diverzanti	Nusret	English title: The Demolition Squad
1968	Pohod		English title: The Trek
1968	Gravitacija	Otac	English title: Gravitation
1968	Opatica i komesar	Stanko	
1968	Uđi ako hoćeš		
1968	Ram za sliku moje drage	Zlatan	
1969	Bitka na Neretvi	Visoki seljak u partizanskoj koloni	English title: Battle of Neretva
1970	Ann och Eve - de erotiska	Farmer	Credited as Zaim Muzaterija; Swedish film; English title: Ann and Eve
1970	Lisice	Todor	English title: Handcuffs
1971	Klopka za generala	Jovan	
1971	Dan duži od godine	Mitar Zmijanjac	English title: A Day Longer Than a Year
1971	Ovcar	Čoban	English title: Shepherd
1972	Slike iz života udarnika		English title: Life of a Shock Force Worker
1973	So	Odbornik	
1973	Pjegava djevojka	Milan	
1974	Polenov prah		English title: Pollen Dust
1975	Doktor Mladen	Petar	
1975	Seljačka buna 1573	Kovačev šegrt	English title: Anno Domini 1573
1977	Hajdučka vremena	Zandar Rasula	English title: Daredevil's Time
1977	Hajka	Paško	
1978	Pogled u noć	Refik Selman	(segment "Koma")
1978	Tren	Arsenov otac	English title: Moment
1980	Izgubljeni zavičaj	Isoma	English title: Lost Homeland
1981	Pad Italije		
1981	Gazija		
1982	Smrt gospodina Goluže	Fotograf	
1982	13. jul	Čamdžija	
1982	Miris dunja	Pekar	English title: The Scent of Quince
1983	Igmanski marš		
1983	Pismo - Glava		English title: Heads or Tails
1985	Otac na službenom putu	Predsjednik	English title: When Father Was Away on Business
1987	Strategija svrake		English title: The Magpie Strategy
1988	Kuća pored pruge	Vukšan	
1989	Žena s krajolikom		
1989	Kuduz		
1990	Gluvi barut	Učitelj Stojan Kekić	English title: Silent Gunpowder
1990	Stanica običnih vozova	Omer	
1990	Death of a Schoolboy		
1990	Adam ledolomak	Visoko	
1991	Đuka Begović	Ilarija Begović	
1991	Tetoviranje	Jordan	
1991	Ovo malo duše	Jusuf	
1991	Bračna putovanja		
1992	Prokleta je Amerika		(Segment "Ruzina osveta")
1997	Savršeni krug	Asaf	English title: The Perfect Circle

=== Television ===
Year	Show	Role	Notes
1974	Trag		Television film
1975	Odbornici		2 episodes
1976	Jagoš i Uglješa	Jagoš	Television film
1976	Gosti i radnici	Isus	Television film
1976	Žena s krajolikom		Television film
1978	Papirna	Vaso	Television film
1978	Ljudski faktor	Safo	Television film
1978	Nevjeste dolaze	Nikola	Television film; English title: The Brides Are Coming
1979	Anno Domini 1573	Kovačev šegrt	2 episodes
1979	Tale	Siromah	Mini-series; 6 episodes
1979	Ivan Goran Kovačić		Television film
1979	Bife Titanik	Nail	Television film; English titles: Buffet Titanic
1979	Todora	Radul - Todorin otac	Television film
1980	Tren		Mini-series
1980	Husinska buna		Television film
1981	Zajedno		Television film
1982	Operacija Teodor		Television film
1982	Kože	Trgovac kožama	
1983	Pijanist		Television film
1983	Odumiranje međeda	Ibro	Television film
1983	Vatrogasac		Television film
1984	Skretničar		Television film
1985	Brisani prostor	Starac II	
1986	Misija majora Atertona		
1986	Vrijeme prošlo - vrijeme sadašnje	Ibro	
1986	Ovo malo duše	Jusuf	Television film
1988	Vizantija		Television film
1990	Majstori mraka	Otac	Television film
1990	Strategija svrake		
1991	Sa 204-272	Mićun	Television film
1991	Sarajevske priče	Hadžija	
1992	Aleksa Šantić		4 episodes
1999	Warriors	Imam	Television film; other titles: Peacekeepers
2000	List	Old Man	Television film (final film role)

=== Short films ===
Year	Short	Role	Notes
1979	Čovjek u neispravnom stanju		
1981	Život piše romane ali nema ko da ih čita		
1998	Kraj doba neprijatnosti		
