= Cheese and Jam =

Kajmak in marmelada Cheese and Jam
- Directed by: Branko Đurić
- Written by: Branko Đurić
- Produced by: Janez Jauh
- Starring: Branko Đurić, Dragan Bjelogrlić, Tanja Ribič, Igor Samobor
- Cinematography: Sven Pepeonik
- Edited by: Miran Miošić
- Music by: Saša Lošić
- Release date: 2003
- Running time: 98 minutes
- Language: Slovene/Serbo-Croatian

Cheese and Jam (Slovene: Kajmak in marmelada, also known as Cottage Cheese and Marmalade) is a 2003 comedy drama about the relationship between a Bosnian man and a Slovene woman in Slovenia, though the film begins by explaining it is about the stigmatized minority of any nation.

== Characters ==
- Branko Đurić as Božo, the beer-drinking, football-watching, jobless guy from Bosnia.
- Tanja Ribič as Špela, his Slovene wife who loves him, but after some fights decides to leave.
- Dragan Bjelogrlić as Goran, Božo's criminal friend who finds the job for Božo when he asks him for help.

== Plot ==
Špela, a younger Slovene woman lives with Bosnian boyfriend Božo. She has a job while Božo is unemployed and prefers staying at home, drinking beer and watching TV. After Špela leaves Božo because of his laziness and lack of will to find a job and moves back to her parents, he asks his friend Goran for help and gets a job as a Mickey Mouse impersonator at a local fair. A chance meeting with Špela leaves her less than impressed due to the simplicity of the job which seems ridiculous to her. Reluctantly, Božo accepts Goran's offer for a job involving smuggling illegal immigrants from Slovenia to Italy.

Goran loses his nerve and forces the immigrants to end their trip before they arrive to Italy - which doesn't go unnoticed by his boss after the immigrants are found by the police. After deceiving his boss, Goran is beaten, but he and Božo are offered a second chance: together with two thugs, they are to intimidate an innkeeper who had stopped paying protection money. Coincidentally, Špela is also there, celebrating her father's birthday. After the initial surprise she verbally attacks Božo for joining the criminals but she is immediately molested by one of the thugs. Seeing this, Božo attacks him with a bottle, causing the other one to pull out a gun and shoot Božo.

Following this incident, the thugs are arrested, Božo is taken to the hospital and Goran is beaten once again. After recovering from the wounds, Božo considers committing suicide, but changes his mind. Špela returns to him and tells him she is pregnant. The film ends with Božo, Špela and their daughter who are now a happy family.

== Release and reception ==
125,000 tickets were sold on the film's release to Slovenian cinemas and it currently holds the Slovenian record for domestic film attendance.

Branko Đurić won a Grand Golden Roll for the film.

Branko Đurić is the real life husband of Tanja Ribič. The role of Božo and Špela's daughter is played by their daughter, Zala Đurić-Ribič.
