= Branko Đurić =

Bosnian actor, comedian, film director and musician (born 1962)

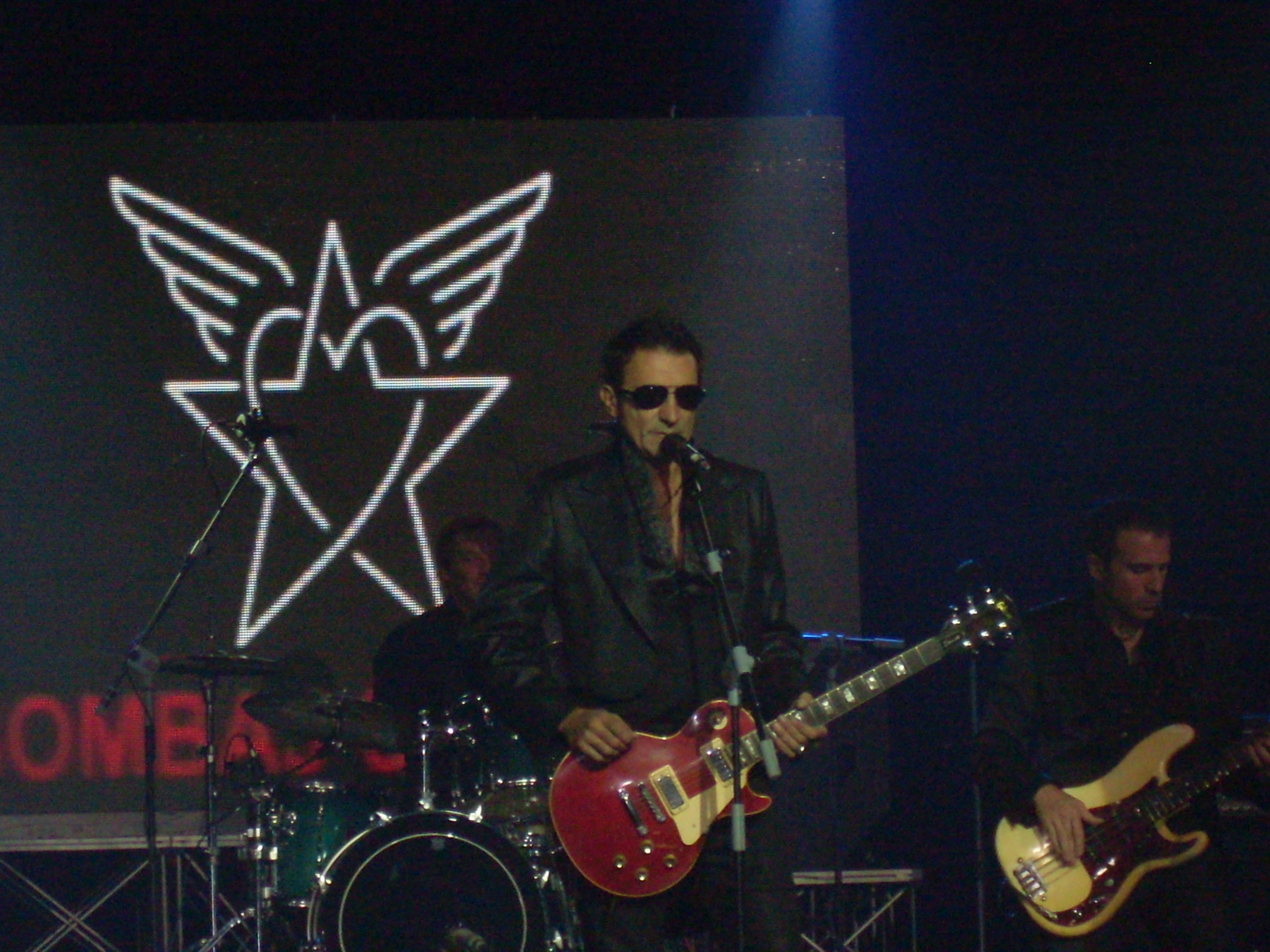
- Đurić performing with Bombaj Štampa in Sarajevo, September 2011
- Born: 28 May 1962 (age 64); Sarajevo, PR Bosnia and Herzegovina, Yugoslavia
- Other name: Đuro
- Occupations: Actor; film director; musician
- Years active: 1984–present
- Spouses: Nevena Đurić (divorced) Tanja Ribič (m. 2000)
- Children: 3
- Musical career
- Genres: Rock; progressive rock; psychedelic rock; experimental
- Instruments: Guitar; vocals
- Labels: Diskoton; Dallas

Branko Đurić (Cyrillic: Бранко Ђурић; born 28 May 1962), commonly known as Đuro (Cyrillic: Ђуро), is a Bosnian actor, comedian, film director and musician.

Born and raised in Sarajevo, Bosnia and Herzegovina, Đurić appeared in the comedy series Top lista nadrealista in the 1980s. He was one of the founding members of the band SCH in 1983, and the frontman of the Sarajevo rock band Bombaj Štampa. In August 1992, Đurić moved to Slovenia because of the Bosnian War. He currently lives and works in Ljubljana.

Đurić starred in the Academy Award-winning film No Man's Land. He also played supporting roles in numerous films, including Time of the Gypsies, Kuduz, Bal-Can-Can, In the Land of Blood and Honey, and See You in Montevideo. He created the comedy series Naša mala klinika, which has also been adapted in Croatia and Serbia.

== Early life ==
Branko Đurić was born on 28 May 1962, to a Serbian father from Kruševac and a Bosnian mother, Fadila. Đurić's father died of cancer when Đurić was one year old.

At age 14, after his mother married Serbian painter Branislav "Branko" Popovac, Đurić began to focus on his interest in art.

Đurić completed his secondary education at the First Sarajevo Gymnasium in 1980. The next year, he applied to the Academy of Performing Arts (ASU), but was rejected. Following this rejection, he enrolled in journalism studies at the University of Sarajevo's Faculty of Political Sciences.

== Career ==
Not giving up on acting after the ASU rejection, Đurić got work as an extra in various TV Sarajevo productions. He simultaneously continued applying to the ASU for each subsequent academic year; after two more rejections in 1982 and 1983, Đurić was accepted in 1984 on his fourth try, at which point he quit the journalism studies.

=== 1984–1985: Early roles: Top lista nadrealista, Audicija, and TV ads ===
In April 1984, while considering another application to the ASU, Đurić joined Top lista nadrealista, a newly launched TV Sarajevo prime time program that combined Norodna muzika with sketch comedy. The show was made by a group of young Sarajevans from the New Primitivism subculture, whom Đurić already knew. The sketches were positioned as comedy interludes between performances by leading folk musicians. The group had been performing weekly on radio for three years before the show reached the Yugoslav Radio Television national television audience.

While filming Top lista nadrealista, Đurić made a brief appearance in a TV Sarajevo-produced, Ademir Kenović-directed music video for the New Primitive band Zabranjeno Pušenje's track "Neću da budem Švabo u dotiranom filmu". During filming, Đurić mentioned his challenges in getting accepted at the ASU to Kenović who responded by connecting him with film director Vuk Janić, who in turn helped Đurić prepare material for another audition that would result in Đurić being accepted for the fall 1984 academic year.

In the meantime, from early June 1984, episodes of Top lista nadrealista began airing on TV Sarajevo's second channel. Đurić played multiple characters, most prominently a jumpy TV station security guard with the catchphrase "Ćega, ba". The show's popularity and focus on folk music led to the cast receiving offers from local promoters and managers, including Rizo Rondić, to perform sketch comedy at live shows and tours across Bosnia. Đurić and his colleague Zenit Đozić accepted many of these offers throughout 1984, performing as comic relief on folk music tours including "Udri kapom o ledinu", "Zasviraj i za pojas zadjeni" and "Prođoh Bosnu pjevajući".

From late 1984 and into 1985, Đurić participated in Audicija, a chamber play-like comedic staging that began as an academic project consisting of ASU students creating, developing and performing characters based on various individuals applying to the academy. Conceptualized as a series of one-on-one auditions between each applicant and a professor, with students drawing upon their own auditioning experiences, the production gained prominence after the recording of one of its stage shows was broadcast as part of TV Sarajevo's Noćni program. Performing alongside fellow students Željko Ninčić, Admir Glamočak, Emir Hadžihafizbegović, Haris Burina, Saša Petrović, Jasmin Geljo, Željko Kecojević, Senad Bašić, and Mladen Nelević, Đurić's streetwise Sarajevan character, Solomon Bičakćić, proved to be among the more popular characters from the show. Despite a generally poor critical reception, Audicija's folksy humour nevertheless became a comedy smash hit throughout Yugoslavia, with Đurić performing in 150 of its stagings across the country before quitting and even somewhat distancing himself from the show in subsequent interviews.

Taking advantage of the sudden popularity of his comedic everyman persona, Đurić, still an ASU student, starred in a series of television ads shot in early 1985 for the Sarajevo tourist board—promoting Jahorina and Bjelašnica mountains as tourist destinations—with recycled folksy catchphrase from Audicija, "Joj razlike, drastićne", delivered as somewhat of a punchline in heavy Sarajevan accent. At first, the commercials—directed by Đurić's old friend and professional collaborator Ademir Kenović and produced by Ismet "Nuno" Arnautalić with Goran Bregović providing the music—aired infrequently. However, they would soon gain further significance once their jingle-like tune (composed by Bregović & featuring vocals by Ðurić) got spun by Bregović into a full-length track called "Hajdemo u planine" ('Let's Go to the Mountains') on Bijelo Dugme's next studio album Pljuni i zapjevaj moja Jugoslavijo released in November 1986, this time sung by the band's vocalist Alen Islamović. With the song in heavy radio rotation and the album selling well, the commercials also began airing a lot more frequently, leading to a surge of popularity for Đurić throughout late 1986 and early 1987. Due to Bregović's habit of reusing old material, the same tune was performed in 1992 by Iggy Pop with different lyrics, titled "Get the Money" for the soundtrack of Arizona Dream.

=== 1987–1989: Early dramatic roles ===
In 1985, while still in the first year of his ASU studies, Ðurić was cast by Kenović for the leading role in the television drama Ovo malo duše. A rural coming-of-age story written by Ranko Božić, Đurić portrayed Ibrahim Halilović, a newly widowed father in a remote Bosnian village. The movie aired on TV Sarajevo in January 1987. Ovo malo duše led to further dramatic roles for Đurić, including in the series Znak (aired on TV Sarajevo) and the film Vanja (on TV Novi Sad).

Ðurić also continued doing TV commercials—this time for Dedo and Nana coffee.

Ðurić experienced a career breakthrough when Palme d'Or-winning director Emir Kusturica cast him in Dom za vešanje; Ðurić's first role in a feature film. As Kusturica's first feature film after his Palme d'Or-winning previous effort, the project received significant attention, as well as a screening at the 1989 Cannes Film Festival.

=== 1989–1992: Popularity in Yugoslavia ===
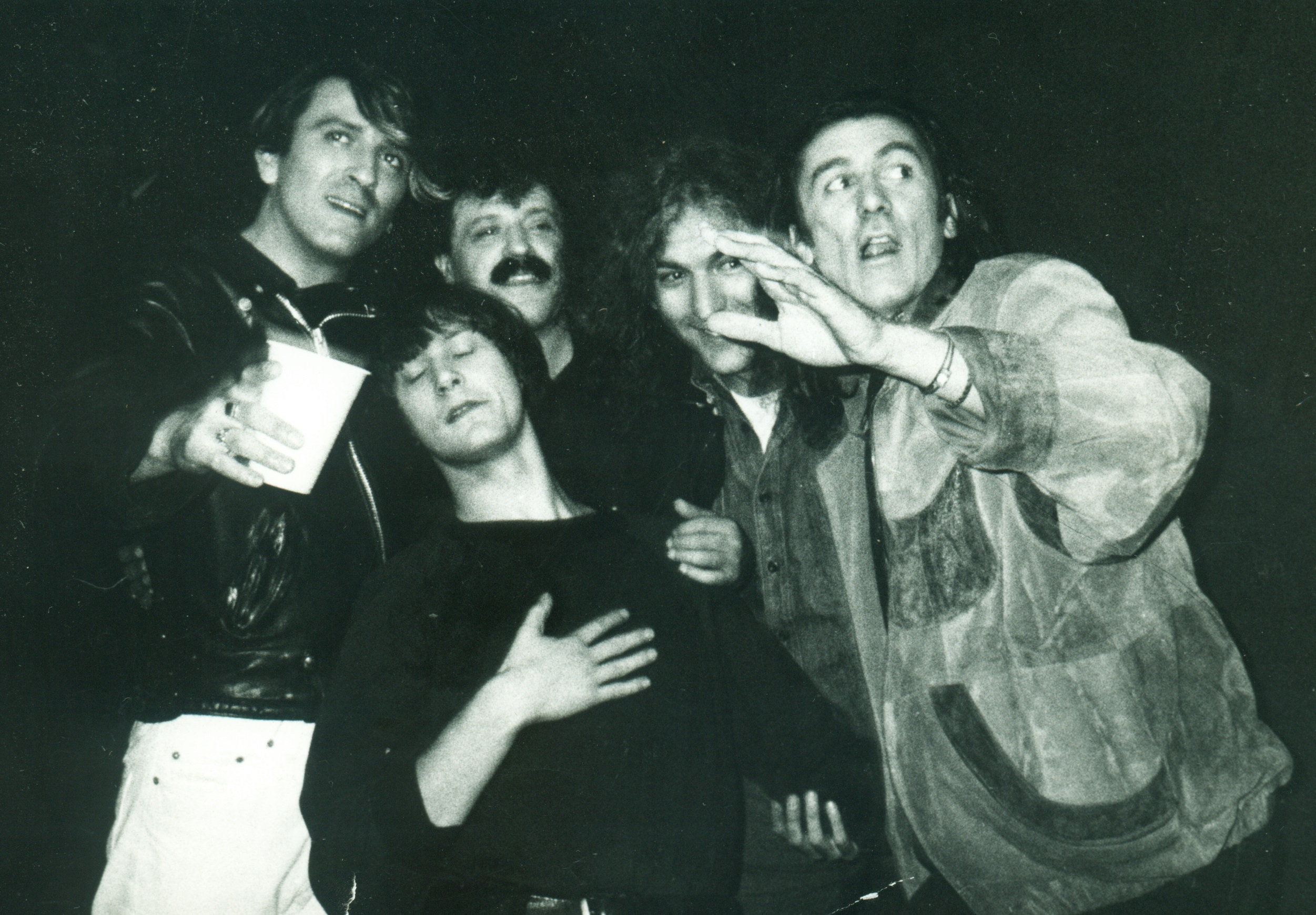
Đuro (far right) with fellow musicians Tifa, Davor Gobac, and Bruno Langer during Čičak's rock marathon in Sarajevo's Zetra on 14 October 1989.

By 1989, Ðurić had appeared in several films and television productions across Yugoslavia. He played a supporting role in Kuduz, Kenović's feature film debut. He appeared in Kako je propao rokenrol, a three-story ensemble film by recent Belgrade Faculty of Dramatic Arts graduates, as the male lead in the third story, opposite actress Vesna Trivalić, about a young couple preparing for the arrival of their first baby.

In 1989, the second series of Top lista nadrealista aired, which was met with positive reception. Ðurić played different comedic characters each week, including the policeman Rade Pendrek, the cranky television viewer Reuf, highly strung news director Đuđi, and do-it-yourself "Đurine kućne čarolije" segment host.

=== Bosnian War and relocation to Slovenia ===
Ðurić fled Sarajevo in August 1992, four months after the beginning of its besiegement at the outbreak of the Bosnian War. He settled in Ljubljana.

He also worked in Croatia, where he had a TV show Pet Minuta Slave (Five Minutes of Fame) on Nova TV, as well as the comedy series Naša mala klinika (Our Little Clinic), aired on POP TV and Nova TV.

In the mid-2000s, Ðurić starred in and directed the sitcom Brat bratu, the Slovenian version of Only Fools and Horses, though it was cancelled after thirteen episodes due to poor viewership.

In February 2007, Ðurić appeared on B92 television in Serbia in Ðurine žute minute short segments, a slightly different take on his "Ðurine kućne čarolije" sketch, which he performed on Top lista nadrealista. The segments, which had a commercial tie-in with Telekom Srbija's Žute strane (Yellow Pages), mostly received poor reviews and were quickly taken off the air.

In 2011, Ðurić played a Serbian soldier in the movie In the Land of Blood and Honey. This was Đurić's second movie about the Bosnian War, after No Man's Land.

=== Musical activity ===
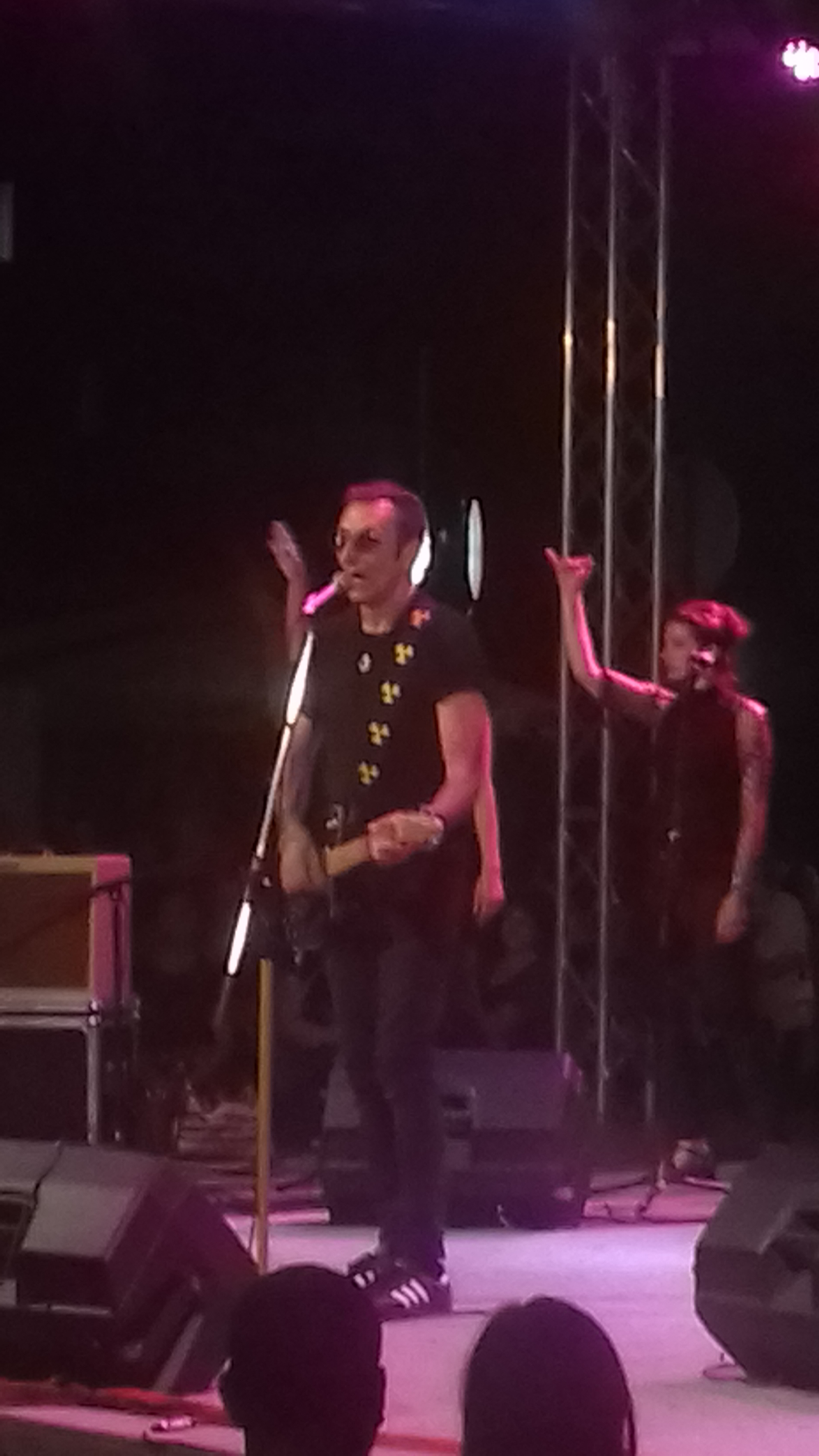
Đuro performing on Zenica summer fest on 25 July 2019.

Alongside his acting career in Yugoslav cinema and theatre, Đurić became involved in music starting in the early 1980s, when he formed a band, Ševe, with childhood friend Nedim Babović.

Đurić briefly joined the industrial rock band SCH in 1983 before joining Babović's band Bombaj Štampa. Despite sporadic activity, Bombaj Štampa released their eponymous debut album under Diskoton in 1987.

Ðurić reunited with Bombaj Štampa in December 2008 for a concert in Sarajevo, alongside Nedim Babović, drummer Dragan Bajić, and bassist Ernie Mendillo. The band later released a new album in 2010.

On 25 July 2019, Đurić and Bombaj Štampa performed for two hours at the Zenica Summer Fest, including the debut of Čekić, which was a new song that was due for release later that year in September, as well as an opera.

== Personal life ==
Đurić married Slovenian actress and singer Tanja Ribič.

He resides in Ljubljana, where he leads the production company Theatre 55.

== Filmography ==
=== Film ===
Title	Year	Role	Notes
A Little Bit of Soul	1987	Ibrahim	
Time of the Gypsies	1988	Sadam	
Kuduz	1989	Alija Boro	
The Fall of Rock and Roll	1989	Đura Veselinović	
No Man's Land	2001	Čiki	
Cheese and Jam	2003	Božo	Also writer and director
Small World	2003	Suspect	
Amatemi	2005	Dražen	
Bal-Can-Can	2005	Šefket Ramadani	
Triage	2009	Dr. Talzani	
In the Land of Blood and Honey	2011	Aleksandar	
With Mom	2013	Mladen	
See You in Montevideo	2014	Paco	
Florence Fight Club	2015	Magi	
Boldt	2018	Himself	
Not So Friendly Neighborhood Affair	2021	Enes	

=== Television ===
Title	Year	Role	Notes
Top lista nadrealista	1984–1991	Various characters	27 episodes
Audicija	1985	Solomon Bičakćić	Television film
Znak	1986	Đuro	Television film
Specijalna redakcija	1989	Jorga	Television film
Naša mala klinika	2004–2007	Dr. Harald Schmidt / Nedim Mulaomerović	Also writer and director
Crimes	2010	Goran Mladić	Television film
Ne diraj mi mamu	2018	Zlatko Sljepčević	Main role
Slow Horses	2022	Viktor Krymov	Season 2 Episode 4
Infamy	2023	Josef	

=== Stage ===
Title	Year	Role	Notes
Đurologija	2015	Himself	
Luda kuća	2018	Various	
Dangerous Game	2018	Dr. Hipolit Monel	

=== Voice-over dubs ===
Title	Year	Role	Notes
The Incredibles	2004	Lucius Best/Frozone	Croatian-language version
Madagascar: Escape 2 Africa	2008	Makunga	Croatian-language version
Despicable Me	2010	Dr. Nefario	Croatian-language version
Despicable Me 2	2013	Dr. Nefario	Croatian-language version
Moana	2016	Tamatoa	Croatian-language version
Incredibles 2	2018	Lucius Best/Frozone	Croatian-language version

== Discography ==
=== With Bombaj Štampa ===
- Bombaj Štampa (1987)
- Ja Mnogo Bolje Letim Sam (1990)
- Neka DJ Odmah Dole CJ (2010)

== Awards and nominations ==
Year	Award	Category	Work	Result
2001	European Film Award	Best Actor	No Man's Land	Nominated
2002	Golden Leopard Award	Best Actor	No Man's Land	Nominated
2003	Golden Roll Award	Best Director	Cheese and Jam	Won
2006	Golden Arena Award	Best Supporting Actor	Bal-Can-Can	Nominated

== See also ==
- Rene Bitorajac
- Danis Tanović
