= Boro Stjepanović =

Bosnian actor (born 1946)

- Born: Borislav Stjepanović; 8 May 1946 (age 80); Vareš, PR Bosnia and Herzegovina, FPR Yugoslavia
- Other name: Boro
- Education: University of Dramatic Arts in Belgrade
- Occupation: Actor
- Years active: 1968–present
- Height: 1.65 m (5 ft 5 in)
- Spouse: Zorica Stjepanović (m. 1974)
- Children: 1

Borislav "Boro" Stjepanović (born 8 May 1946) is a Bosnian film, theater and television actor.

He has played in over 50 films since the 1960s, most notably in Sjećaš li se Doli Bel, Ko to tamo peva, Čudo neviđeno, Miris dunja, Kuduz, Gluvi barut, First Class Thieves, Oscar award winning Bosnian film No Man's Land and many others.

Stjepanović has also appeared in many television series and sitcoms like Viza za budućnost, Tata i zetovi, Naša mala klinika (Serbian version) and Lud, zbunjen, normalan.

== Selected filmography ==
=== Film ===
- Ko to tamo peva (1980), as The Bald Guy
- Sjećaš li se Doli Bel? (1981), as Cvikeraš
- Miris dunja (1982), as Alkalaj
- Čudo neviđeno (1984), as Soro
- Kuduz (1989), as Rudo
- Gluvi barut (1990), as Luka Kaljak
- No Man's Land (2001), as Bosnian soldier
- First Class Thieves (2005), as Prison manager
- Our Everyday Life (2015), as Aljo

=== Television ===
- Bolji život (1990–1991), as Bogdan Bekčić
- Viza za budućnost (2005–2008), as Aleksandar Jović
- Tata i zetovi (2006–2007), as Žarko Bošnjak
- Naša mala klinika (Serbian version) (2007–2011), as Dr. Guzina
- Lud, zbunjen, normalan (2010), as Dr. Đuro Ubiparip
