= Vinci Vogue Anžlovar =

Slovenian film director (1963–2024)

- Born: 19 October 1963; Ljubljana, SR Slovenia, SFR Yugoslavia
- Died: 1 December 2024 (aged 61); Ljubljana, Slovenia
- Occupation: Filmmaker

Vinci Vogue Anžlovar (19 October 1963 – 1 December 2024) was a Slovenian film director. He directed Grandma Goes South (Slovene: Babica gre na jug), the first full-length film in the independent Slovenia. In 2009, he was awarded the media award Victor for his movie The Gorjanci Vampire (Slovene: Vampir z Gorjancev; Gorjanci being a mountain range in Southeastern Slovenia).

For the last two years of his life, he battled ALS. He died from complications of the disease on 1 December 2024, at the age of 61.

== Filmography ==
1. 1991 – Babica gre na jug (Grandma Goes South)
2. 1993 – Gypsy Eyes
3. 2001 – Poker
4. 2008 – Vampir z Gorjancev (The Gorjanci Vampire)
