= The Perfect Circle =

The Perfect Circle (Savršeni krug)
- Directed by: Ademir Kenović
- Screenplay by: Ademir Kenović; Abdulah Sidran; Pjer Žalica
- Starring: Mustafa Nadarević; Almedin Leleta; Almir Podgorica
- Cinematography: Milenko Uherka
- Edited by: Christel Tanović
- Music by: Esad Arnautalić; Ranko Rihtman
- Release date: 24 August 1997 (Montreal World Film Festival)
- Running time: 113 minutes
- Country: Bosnia and Herzegovina
- Language: Bosnian

The Perfect Circle (Bosnian: Savršeni krug) is a 1997 Bosnian war drama film by Ademir Kenović set in Sarajevo during the siege of 1992-1996. It was written by Kenović with Pjer Žalica and Abdulah Sidran. The title derives from the ability of "Hamza" (played by Mustafa Nadarević) to draw perfect circles on paper.

== Plot ==
A Bosnian poet (Hamza) lives with his family in Sarajevo during the horrific siege of the city in the early 1990s. The war in Bosnia is raging all around them. After sending his wife (Gospoda) and daughter (Miranda) to Croatia, he finds two orphans Adis and Kerim, who have escaped a massacre in their own village, hiding in his home. After escaping their village the orphans have come to Sarajevo in search of their aunt, who used to live in the Bistrik district. Hamza decides to help the boys by sheltering them and helping them look for their aunt. After a long search, Hamza discovers that the boys' aunt has been airlifted to Germany. Upon learning this, Hamza tries to save the kids by sending them out of the war zone. But the only way out is through the Sarajevo International Airport, which is a dangerous passage occupied and monitored by Chetniks and their death squads as well as snipers. As they try to cross and take refuge from Serb shelling in a building, a Serb soldier shoots the dog that Adis and Kerim have adopted. Kerim kills two Serbs as they are approaching Hamza and him. Outside of the building, Hamza and Kerim find Adis, who has died. They take him to the cemetery to be buried. On the wooden headstone placed on the grave, Kerim writes 'Adis', and encircles the name.

In many scenes Hamza is seen with the two kids speaking monologues, while observing photos of his wife and daughter. All the poetry cited in the film by Hamza are verses written by Abdulah Sidran, renowned Bosnian writer and poet, best known for his 1993 poetry masterpiece Sarajevski tabut ("The Coffin of Sarajevo").

== Cast ==
- Mustafa Nadarević - Hamza
- Almedin Leleta - Adis
- Almir Podgorica - Kerim
- Jasna Diklić - Gospoda
- Mirela Lambić - Miranda
- Ljubica Lohajner-Znidarić - an old woman
- Dragan Marinković
- Mira Avram - mother of Hamza
- Sabina Bambur
- Senad Bašić - Strazar
- Amina Begović - Gordana
- Vedrana Seksan
- Božidar Bunjevac - Grobar
- Ines Fančović - Baka
- Admir Glamočak - Staka
- Zaim Muzaferija - Asaf
- Elvira Delalić

== Production ==
Principal photography was originally scheduled for the Spring of 1992, but the siege of 1992-1996 began before any filming could be completed. The screenplay was retooled during the siege while the director and writers took refuge in a Holiday Inn that had originally been constructed for the 1984 Olympics. Filming began again in 1996 after the signing of the Dayton Peace Accord and after director Ademir Kenović had gotten permission from the United Nations, whose forces were still monitoring the area. The film would go on to become the first Bosnian feature released after the 1992 Bosnian independence referendum, making it in some sense the first Bosnian film.

== Awards ==
- "François Chalais Prize" at 1997 Cannes Film Festival
- "Tokyo Sakura Grand Prix" at 1997 Tokyo International Film Festival

== See also ==
- Bosnian War
- Siege of Sarajevo
- List of Bosnia and Herzegovina films
- List of films featuring the deaf and hard of hearing
