= Ademir Kenović =

Bosnian film director and producer (born 1950)

- Born: September 14, 1950 (age 75); Sarajevo, SR Bosnia and Herzegovina, FPR Yugoslavia
- Occupation(s): Film director, producer
- Years active: 1986–present

Ademir Kenović (born September 14, 1950) is a Bosnian film director and producer.

== Education and Career ==
He graduated from the University of Sarajevo in 1975. In 1972–73 he studied film, English literature and art at the Denison University in Ohio. His films include Kuduz (1989) and A Little Bit of Soul (1987). His 1997 work The Perfect Circle won the François Chalais Prize. He also produced the popular 2004 Bosnian film Days and Hours.
