= Croatian literature =

Croatian literature (Croatian: Hrvatska književnost) refers to literary works attributed to the medieval and modern culture of the Croats, Croatia, and Croatian. Besides the modern language whose shape and orthography were standardized in the late 19th century, it also covers the oldest works produced within the modern borders of Croatia, written in Church Slavonic and Medieval Latin, as well as vernacular works written in Čakavian and Kajkavian dialects.

== Croatian medieval literature ==
Croatian medieval prose is similar to other European medieval literature of the time. The oldest testaments to Croatian literacy are dated to the 11th and 12th centuries, and Croatian medieval literature lasted until the middle of the 16th century. Some elements of medieval forms can be found even in 18th-century Croatian literature, meaning their influence was stronger in Croatia than in the rest of Europe. Early Croatian literature was inscribed on stone tablets, hand-written on manuscripts, and printed in books. A special segment of Croatian medieval literature is written in Latin. The first works on hagiography and the history of the Church were written in the Dalmatian coastal cities (Split, Zadar, Trogir, Osor, Dubrovnik, Kotor), for example the "Splitski evanđelistar" (6th–7th century) and other liturgical and non-liturgical works. The beginning of Croatian medieval literature is marked by Latin hagiography, with texts about Dalmatian and Istrian martyrs: Saint Duje, Saint Anastasius, Saint Maurice and Saint Germanus. In Panonia in northern Croatia, works about Christian cults were created, such as that of Saint Quirinus, Saint Eusebius and Saint Pollio. For centuries, the Croats wrote all their works regarding law, history (chronicles) and scientific works in Latin, so they were available as part of a wider European literature.

Croatian medieval prose was written in two languages, Croatian and Church Slavonic, using three different alphabets, Glagolitic, Latin and Bosnian Cyrillic. Among these, there was some interaction, as evidenced by documents carrying two forms of letters, especially with respect to Glagolitic and Cyrillic texts, and some Latin relied on Glagolitic forms. That interaction makes Croatian writing unique among Slavic prose and even in European literature. Croatian medieval literature reflects the general trends within European literature, though there were some different traits, for example, literature directed at the common people, a strong background tradition of oral literature, blending of religious topics and interweaving of genres. A significant part of Croatian early literature is based on translations, with typical Central European edits. Croatian early literature was influenced by two spheres: from the East (Byzantine and Church Slavonic inheritance) and the West (from Latin, Italian, Franco-Italian and Czech traditions).

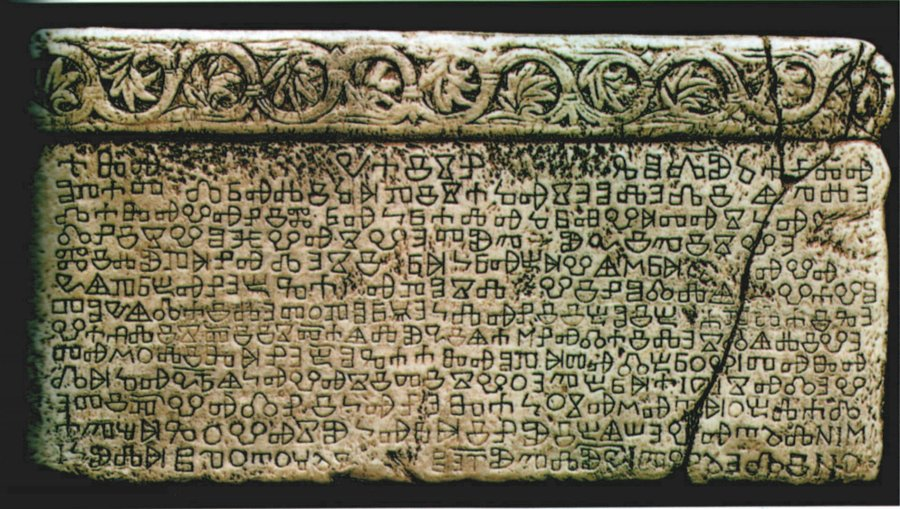
Baška tablet (1100)

From the 14th century, western influence remained strong in Croatian literature. Recognizing these patterns, Croatian authors, mostly anonymous, adapted their work to the specific needs of the community in which and for which they wrote. Despite their writings being largely translations, this literature achieved a notably artistic level of language and style. One of the most significant achievements was keeping alive the Church Slavonic written language (especially in the Glagolitic alphabet). In later periods, elements of that language came to be used in expressive ways and as a signal of "high style", incorporating current vernacular words and becoming capable of transferring knowledge on a wide range of subjects, from law and theology, chronicles and scientific texts, to works of literature. Such medieval works in the people's own language are the starting point for the literature of later periods. Anonymous poets and singers, developing their own styles of typically religious poetry of this period, were referred to as the "začinjavci" by later authors and sources.

As such, the first secular poetry in the native language also began appearing during the middle of the 14th century, both written in Glagolithic and Latin scripts, most notable of which is Svit se konča ("The world is ending").

The oldest artefacts of Croatian medieval prose are Glagolitic inscribed stone tablets: Valun tablet, Plomin tablet and the Krk inscription from the 11th century, and the Baška tablet from the 11th or 12th century. The Baška tablet is the first complete document on the people's language with elements of literal Church Slavonic. It is often regarded as the "birth certificate" of Croatian, and carries the first mention of the Croats. The inscribed stone records King Zvonimir's donation of a piece of land to a Benedictine abbey in the time of Abbot Drzhiha. It provides the only example of the transition from the Glagolitic of the rounded Macedonian type to the angular Croatian alphabet.

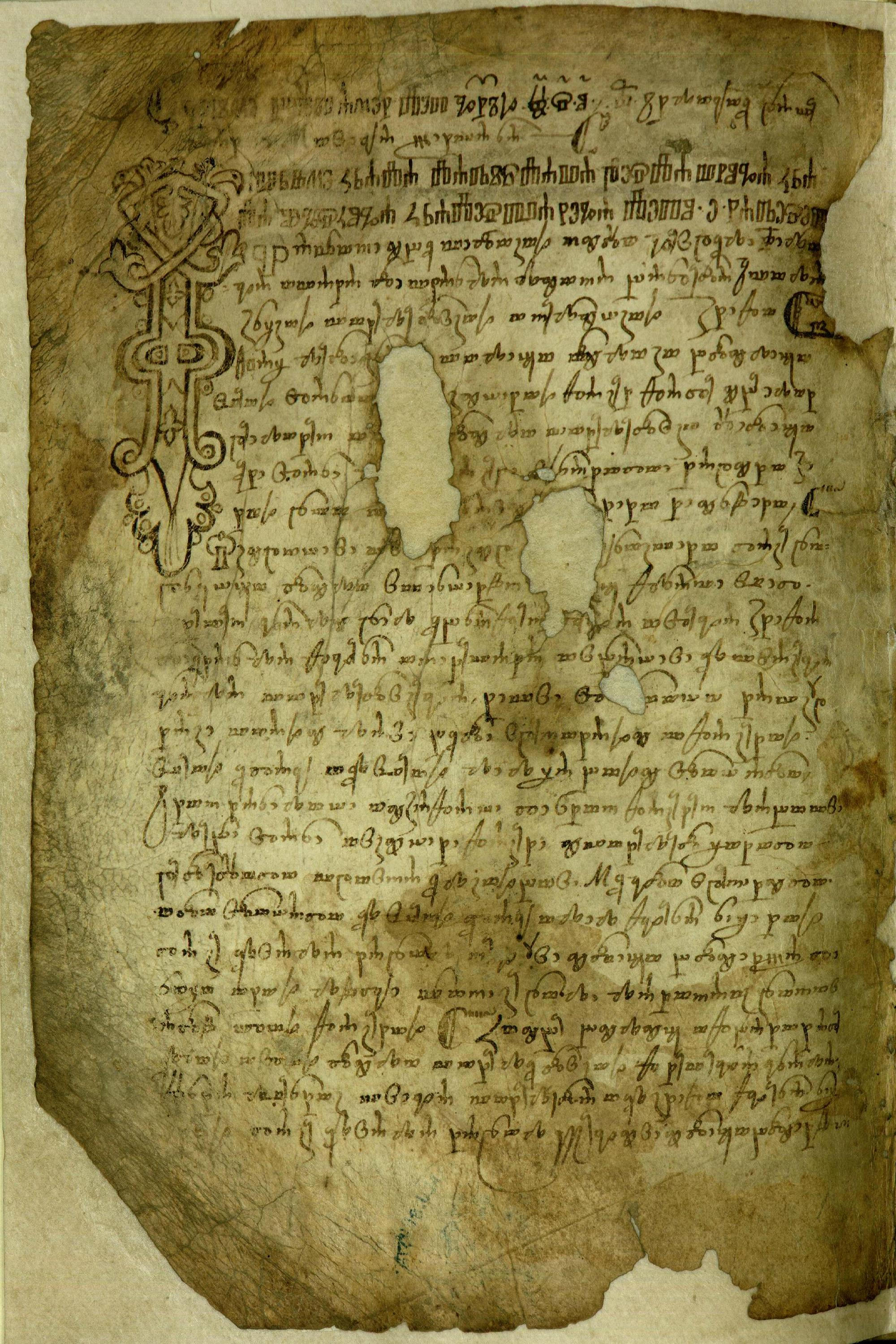
Vinodol Statute (1288)

Other early writings are the Senj tablet, Plastovo tablet, Knin tablet and Supetar tablet, all dating to the 12th century and the Humac tablet from the 11th or 12th century. The fragments of the Vienna leaves from a Glagolithic codex dating from the 11th/12th century, written somewhere in Western Croatia, represents the first liturgical writing of Croatian recension in the Church Slavonic. The Povlja tablet (Croatian: Povaljska listina) is the earliest document written in the Cyrillic script, dating from the 12th century and tracing its origin to Brač, it features the standard "archaic" Chakavian dialect.

Other legal documents such as the Vrbnik Statute, Vinodol statute and Kastav Statute describe the regulations of those coastal cities as administrative centres.

Only fragments are saved from hand-written documents, and they bear witness to a rich literary tradition on Croatian soil. These are part of biblical-liturgical works: fragments of apostles, such as Mihanović's apostle and Grašković's fragment, both created in the 12th century; fragments of missals, such as the first page of Kievan papers from the 11th or 12th century and the Vienna papers from the 12th century, those are the oldest Croatian documents of liturgical content; fragments of breviaries, like the London fragments, Vrbnik fragments and Ročki fragments, all dating to the 13th century. All of the Glagolitic documents form a continuity with those created simultaneously in Bulgarian, Macedonian, Czech and Russian areas. But by the 12th and 13th centuries, the Croats had developed their own form of Glagolitic script and were adapting Croatian with Chakavian influences. In doing so, the Croats formed their own version of Church Slavonic, which lasted into the 16th century. At the same time, biblical books were written according to the model of the Latin Vulgate. From that time come the oldest surviving texts of hagiographic legends and apocryphal prose, an example being the Budapest fragments (12th century with part of a legend about Saint Simeon and Saint Thecla from the 13th century, part of apocryphal works of Paul and Thecla).

== Renaissance literature ==
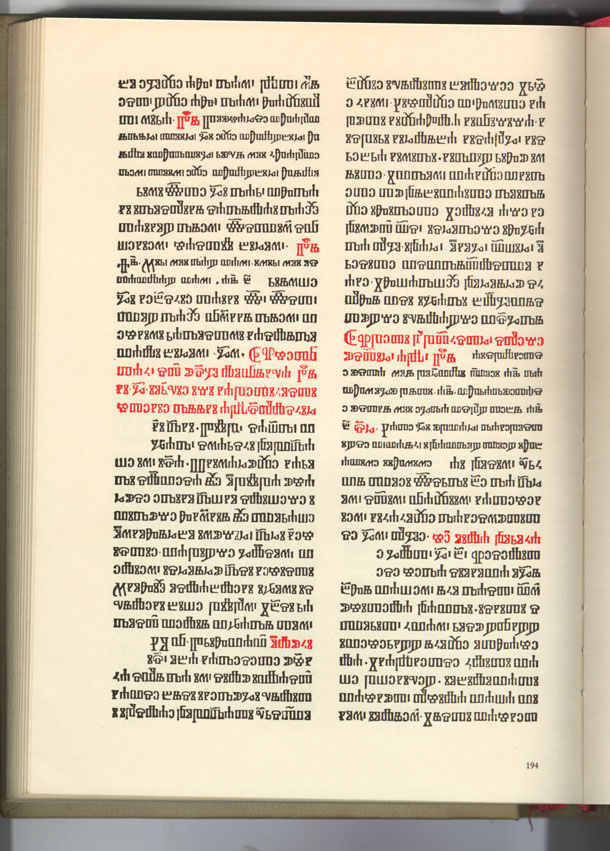
Missale Romanum Glagolitice

The first book printed in Croatian is the Missale Romanum Glagolitice (Croatian: Misal po zakonu rimskoga dvora). Dating from 1483, it was notable as being the first non-Latin printed missal anywhere in Europe. It is also the first printed book of the South Slavic idiom.

New poetical forms from elsewhere in Europe were absorbed during the 15th and 16th centuries. The Croatian Renaissance, strongly influenced by Italian and Western European literature, was most fully developed in the coastal areas of Croatia.

In the Republic of Ragusa (today's Dubrovnik), there was a flowering of vernacular lyrical poetry, particularly love poems. One of the most important records of the early works is Nikša Ranjina's Miscellany, a collection of poems, mostly written by Šiško Menčetić and Džore Držić. Poems in the miscellany deal chiefly with the topic of love and are written predominantly in a doubly-rhymed dodecasyllabic meter.

In Split, the Dalmatian humanist Marko Marulić was widely known in Europe at the time for his writings in Latin, but his major legacy is considered to be his works in Croatian, the most celebrated of which is the epic poem Judita, written in 1501 and published in Venice in 1521. It is based on the Biblical tale from the Deuterocanonical Book of Judith and written in the Čakavian dialect. The work is described by him as u versi haruacchi slozhena ("arranged in Croatian stanzas"). It incorporates figures and events from the classical Bible, adapting them for contemporary literature.

The next important artistic figure in the early stages of the Croatian Renaissance was Petar Hektorović, the song collector and poet from the island of Hvar, most notable for his poem Fishing and Fishermen's Talk. It is the first piece of Croatian literature written in verse in which travel is not described allegorically but as a real journey, describing the beauties of nature and homeland. Hektorović also recorded the songs sung by the fishermen, making this one of the earliest examples in Croatian literature to include transcribed folk music within the text. This makes Ribanje a work that blends artistic and folk literature. At the same time in Hvar, Hanibal Lucić was translating Ovid's work (Croatian: "iz latinske odiće svukavši u našu harvacku priobukal"). He also wrote drama - his play Robinja (The Slave Girl) being the first secular play in Croatian literature - and love poetry.

Croatian literature expanded into prose and plays with authors such as Dinko Zlatarić, Mavro Vetranović and Marin Držić. The first Croatian novel, Planine (Mountains) written by Petar Zoranić and published posthumously in 1569 in Venice, featured the author as an adventurer, portraying his passionate love towards a native girl. It was uniquely stylized and provided a description of the surrounding land against the backdrop of the then-current political situation of invading Turks.

== Baroque literature ==
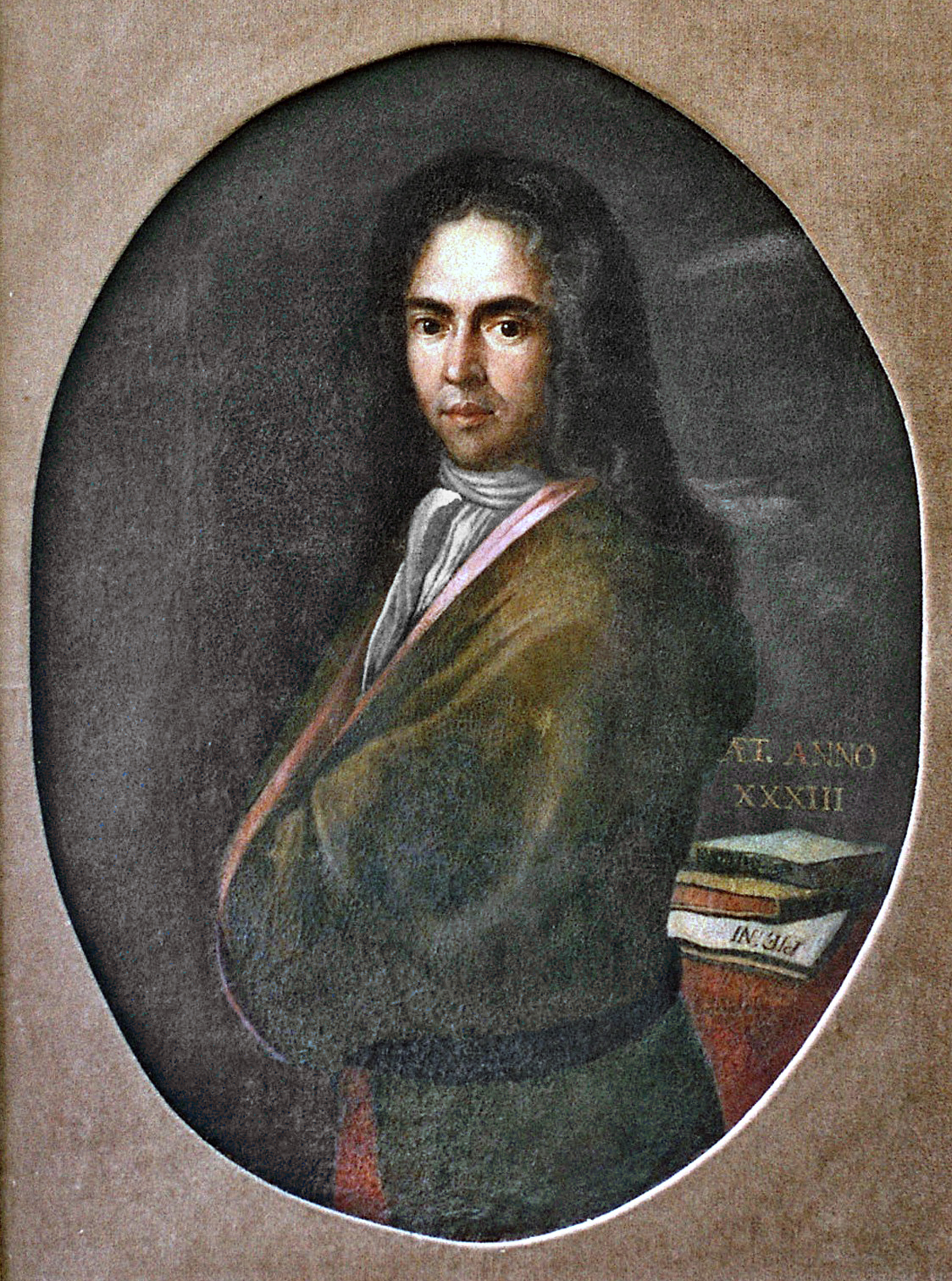
Ivan Gundulić (1589/8-1638)

The prevailing Baroque culture emerged in Croatia later during the 17th century, where it was a period of counter-reformation. Literature was marked by flamboyance, with pious and lofty themes using rich metaphors in which the form becomes more important than the content. Regional literary circles developed, such as Dubrovnik, Slavic, Kajkav and Ozalj. At this time, the lack of a standard Croatian language became a prominent issue.

Dubrovnik became the chief literary centre, with Ivan Gundulić playing a leading role. Gundulić's most famous play is Dubravka, a pastoral written in 1628, where he rhapsodises on the former glory of Dubrovnik, and it contains some of the most famous verses in Croatian literature: O liepa, o draga, o slatka slobodo (Fair liberty, beloved liberty, liberty sweetly avowed). In his greatest work, Osman (Gundulić), Gundulić presents the contrasts between Christianity and Islam, Europe and the Turks, West and East, and what he viewed as freedom and slavery. The work is firmly rooted within the rich literary tradition of the Croatian Baroque in Dubrovnik and Dalmatia and is considered one of its masterpieces.

Other notable literary figures in Dubrovnik at the time were Junije Palmotić, Ivan Bunić Vučić, Ignjat Đurđević, Stijepo Đurđević, Vladislav Menčetić, Petar Bogašinović, Petar Kanavelić, Jerolim Kavanjin and Rafael Levaković. Many works were translated from Latin and Italian into the local vernacular language and specifically, that used by the lower-class peasantry of the city.

Most notable works from northern, continental literary circles include Fran Krsto Frankopan's Gartlic za čas kratiti, a collection of lyric poems and Pavao Ritter Vitezović's Odiljenje sigetsko, an intertextual lyrical work written in innovative genre first published in 1684. Katarina Zrinska published her 1660 prayer book Putni tovaruš in Venice, which is praised by literary historians as a high literary achievement of the Croatian Baroque literature.

In the Kajkavian circle, the most important figure was the Jesuit Juraj Habdelić, who wrote on religious themes. His best-known work is Zrcalo Mariansko (Mary's Mirror), and he produced a Kajkavian to Latin dictionary.

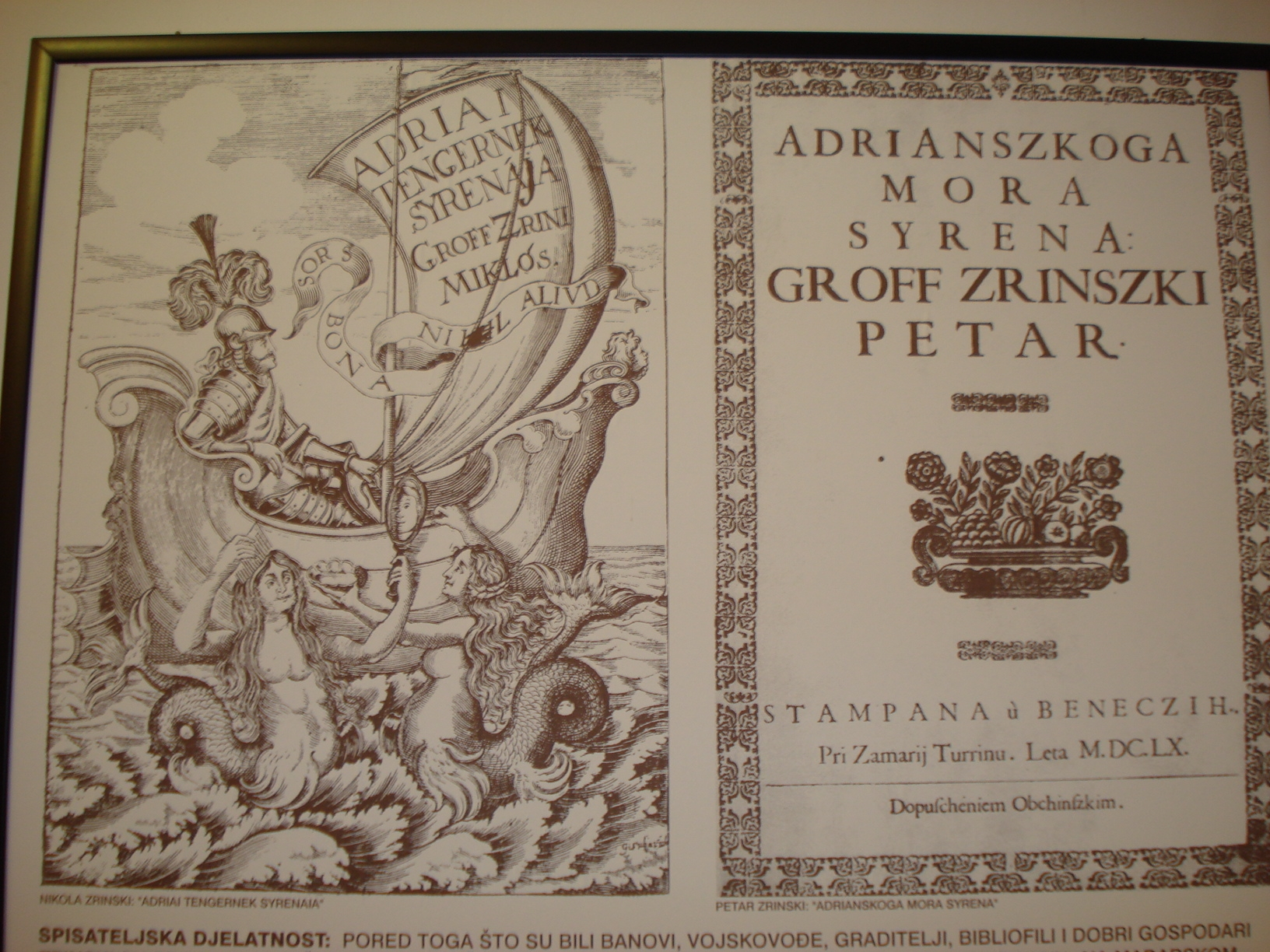
Petar Zrinski translated his brother Nikola's epic poem The Siren of the Adriatic Sea into Croatian

In the Slavic circle, another Jesuit, Antun Kanižlić wrote the epic poem Sveta Rožalija (St Rosalia) the story of the saint of Palermo.

The Ozalj circle is characterised by the language that unites all three dialects – the Kajkavian dialect mixed with čakavian, štokavian and Ikavian/Ekavian-equal elements. The most important authors in this circle are Petar Zrinski, Ana Katarina Zrinska, Fran Krsto Frankopan and Ivan Belostenec.

Many scientific works were also produced at this time, especially lexicons.

- Ivan Lucić wrote the first scientific history of Croatia in Latin: De regno Dalmatiae et Croatiae.
- Ivan Belostenec, a Pauline monk and member of the Ozalj circle, wrote a Kajkavian-Latin dictionary: Gazophylacium.
- Jakov Mikalja, wrote a Croatian-Italian-Latin dictionary: Blago jezika slovniskoga (Blessed Slavic language) and published the first orthography of the Slavic languages
- Bartol Kašić, whose most important work is Institutionum linguae Illyricae, the first Croatian grammar which was published in Rome in Latin.

== 18th century literature and the Age of Enlightenment ==
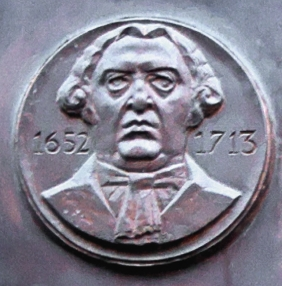
Pavao Ritter Vitezović

In the 18th century, there was a new attitude towards literature, as the greater part of Dalmatia and Slavonia were freed from Ottoman rule, and new ideas of Enlightenment were circulating from Western Europe, especially with regard to the social reforms of Maria Theresa and Joseph II in the northern part of Croatia. The artistic range is not as great in this period as during the Renaissance or the Baroque, but there is a greater distribution of works and a growing integration of the literature of the separate areas of Dalmatia, Bosnia, Herzegovina, Slavonia, Dubrovnik and northwestern Croatia, which will lead into the national and political movements of the 19th century.

The most prominent Croatian author of the Enlightenment era was Pavao Ritter Vitezović, who was a historian and the founder of the modern Pan-slavic ideology. He published histories (Stemmatographia, Croatia Rediviva), epics (Odiljenje sigetsko), reformed the lettering system, formed a printing press, and wrote chronicles and calendars. Many of his ideas formed the basis of the later Illyrian Movement (also known as the Croatian National Revival) protesting the rule of the Austro-Hungarian Monarchy.

Mihalj Šilobod Bolšić (1724–1787), a Roman Catholic priest, mathematician, writer, and musical theorist published the first Croatian arithmetic textbook Arithmatika Horvatzka (1758). He also published a number of other seminal works, including Zbirka crkvenih pjesama ("Collection of Church Songs"; 1757), an anthology of traditional songs and hymns from the Samobor region and Fundamentum cantus Gregoriani, seu chroralis pro Captu Tyronis discipuli, ex probatis authoribus collectum, et brevi, ac facili dialogica methodo in lucem expositum opera, ac studio ("The basis of the singing of Gregorian melodies, or the chorales definite for the disciples saw it, from the classical authors, and deposited in a short time, exposed to the light of the work of the Method in the rich and of easy dialogic, and a studio.") (1760), which is still studied in the theological conservatory in Rome and is considered a great theoretical guide to choral singing even after a century has passed.

The Slavonian Antun Kanižlić, author of the poem Sveta Rožalija, was the first of the northern writers to encounter the work of the Dubrovnik poets, particularly that of Ignjat Đurdevića. Kanižlić was one of the main protagonists of the Slavonskoga duhovnoga prepared (Slavonian spiritual revival), which was strongly influenced by the Southern literature from Dalmatia.

In Dubrovnik at that time were a number of prominent scholars, philosophers and writers in Latin, for example Ruđer Bošković, Bernard Džamanjić, Džono Rastić, and at the turn of the 19th century Đuro Hidža and Marko Bruerević-Desrivaux who wrote in Latin, Italian and Croatian.

Towards the end of the period, the Franciscan Joakim Stulić published a comprehensive Dubrovnik dictionary. A famous Latin scholar in northern Croatia was chronicler Baltazar Adam Krčelić, while in Slavonia, Matija Petar Katančić (author of the first Croatian printed version of the bible) and Tituš Brezovački (the most important playwright in the Kajkavian area) also wrote in Croatian.

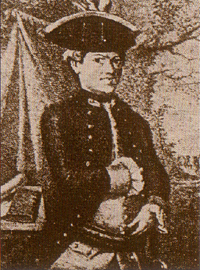
Matija Antun Reljković

A special place in the literature of the 18th century is held by the poet and writer Filip Grabovac and the Franciscan writer Andrija Kačić Miošić. Grabovac's Cvit razgovora naroda i jezika iliričkoga aliti rvackoga (Conversation of peasants and the Illyrian or Croatian language), from 1747 unites Croatian medieval literature with that of the Bosnian Franciscans while Kačić's Razgovor ugodni naroda slovinskoga (Pleasant conversation of Slavic people) from 1756 in verse and prose, was once one of the most widely read books in Croatian (translated into a dozen languages and has been reprinted almost 70 times by the end of the 20th century). This work, together with that of Matija Antun Relković, definitively set the idioms for Croatian in the Croatian National Revival movement. Relković, as a prisoner in Dresden, compared Slavonia with Germany in his 1762 poem Satir iliti divji čovik (Satyr or Wildman). Relković's influence is generally contained in his linguistic idioms and other grammatical and philological works. Having spread the štokavian idiom in the second half of the 18th century, he is, along with Andrija Kačić Miošić, considered to be one of the most decisive influences that helped shape standard Croatian.

Other notable contributors to religious and educational work, lexigraphic, grammar, and histories were Bosnian Franciscans, most notably Filip Lastrić, Nikola Lašvanin and from Herzegovina, Lovro Šitović. Besides Kanižlić, other authors were writing moral teachings and Enlightenment ideas in verse in Slavonia.

Theatre in the 18th century was performed in almost all the coastal cities from Dubrovnik, Hvar and Korčula to Zadar, Senj and Rijeka, and in northern Croatia from Zagreb and Varaždin to Požega and Osijek. In Dubrovnik, 23 plays by Molière were translated and performed, still unusual at the time. The best drama written in Croatian during the 18th century was Kate Kapuralica by Vlaha Stulli. The great playwright of the period was Tituš Brezovački, who wrote in the Kajkavian dialect (Matijaš grabancijaš dijak, «Diogeneš»).

== Romanticism and the Croatian National Revival ==
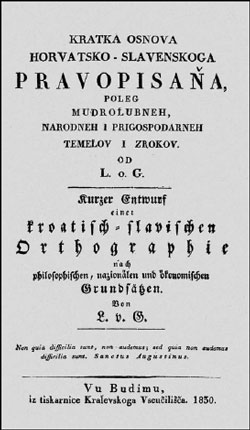
Brief Basics of the Croatian-Slavonic Orthography (1830)

The basic component of Romanticism in Croatian literature is the growing movement towards national identity. In addition to connecting with their local heritage, there was a belated influence of German Romanticism and the national awareness of other areas within the Habsburg monarchy. Since almost all Croatian poets of the time also wrote in German, the Croatian linguistic and cultural emancipation followed Central European patterns that were rooted in German culture and literature.

The Illyrian movement began in 1835 as a small circle of mostly younger intellectuals, led by Ljudevit Gaj, based around the magazine Danica ilirska (Illyrian Morning Star). They had plans for the cultural, scientific, educational and economic development of Croatia. At the centre of their activities was reform of the language, particularly the foundation of a single standard, based on the rich literary heritage. A common orthographic book set the new grammatical standards for the language, had been published by Gaj in 1830, entitled Kratka osnova horvatsko-slavenskog pravopisanja (otherwise known as Gaj's Latin alphabet). Gaj's Latin alphabet was one of the two official scripts used to write Serbo-Croatian until the dissolution of Yugoslavia.

Poets of the period were Ivan Mažuranić, Stanko Vraz and Petar Preradović. Mažuranić's epic Smrt Smail-age Čengića (The Death of Smail Agha Čengić) (1846) is considered to be the most mature work of Croatian romanticism, a combination of the Dubrovnik literary style and folk epic tradition. The literary magazine Kolo (Wheel) was launched in 1842 by Dragutin Rakovac, Ljudevit Vukotinović and Stanko Vraz. It was the first Croatian periodical to set high aesthetic and critical standards. Writing patriotic, love and reflective lyrics Preradović became the most prolific and popular poet of the period.

Dimitrije Demeter, author of the patriotic epic Grobničko polje (Grobnik Plain) in 1842, laid the foundation for the New Croatian Theatre, as manager and writer. His most important dramatic work, Teuta (1844), draws on Illyrian history. Other writers of the time are Antun Nemčić, author of a drama called Kvas bez kruha (Yeast bread), and of the best travelogue of his time called Putositnice (Travel Details) (1845), the writing of which was heavily influenced by Laurence Sterne and his A Sentimental Journey Through France and Italy. Matija Mažuranić wrote the travelogue Pogled u Bosnu (A Look into Bosnia) (1842), which was at the time very interesting because people knew almost nothing about modern Bosnia. Ivan Kukuljević Sakcinski was a politician, scientist, historian, and the first writer of plays based on more recent Croatian literature: Juran i Sofija (1839), and he also wrote travelogues. Ljudevit Vukotinović began writing in the Kajkavavian dialect and, along with Vraz, is one of the pioneers of literary criticism.

A number of authors consider the work of Ivan Filipović Mali Tobolac raznoga cvetja za dobru i promnjivu mladež naroda srbo-ilirskoga to be the first work of Children's literature in Croatia. Some authors hold a different view.

Other notable literary contributions were made by the diplomat Antun Mihanović (notably Horvatska Domovina which later became the Croatian Hymn Our Beautiful Homeland)

== Protorealism and Realism ==
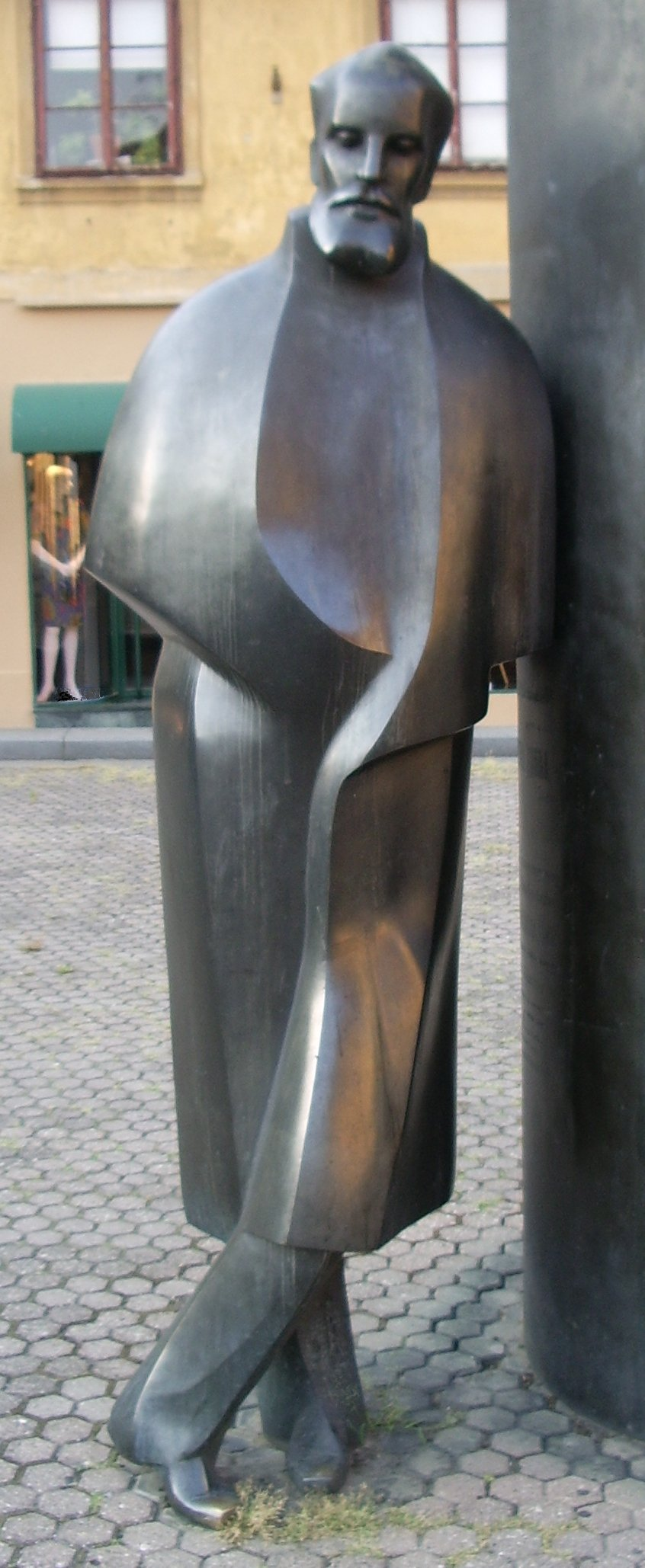
Statue of August Šenoa in Vlaška street, Zagreb

The period after 1848 saw a new generation of writers who acted as a transition between Romanticism and Realism. Some literary historians refer to it as "Photorealism", a time marked by the author August Šenoa whose work combined the flamboyant language of national romanticism with realistic depictions of peasant life. Šenoa considered that Croatian literature was too remote from real people's lives and that artistic creations should have a positive effect on the nation. He introduced the historical novel into Croatian literature, and from 1874 to 1881, edited the literary journal Vienac (Wreath), which was the focal point of Croatian literary life until 1903. It was in that magazine that he published many of his works, including the first modern Croatian novel, Zlatarovo zlato (Goldsmith's Gold, 1871), poems, stories, and historical novels, making him the most prominent Croatian writer of the 19th century.

The patronage of Bishop Josip Juraj Strossmayer enabled the founding of the Yugoslav Academy of Sciences and Arts in 1866, as well as the re-establishment of the University of Zagreb in 1874. Another important figure of the time was Adolfo Veber Tkalčević, a philologist, writer, literary critic and aestheticist. He continued the tradition of the Illyrian movement, at the same time introducing elements of Realism into Croatian literature. He was the author of the first syntax of standard Croatian, Skladanja ilirskog jezika ("Composing the Illyrian language", Vienna 1859). He authored several school-level textbooks and his Slovnica hrvatska published in 1871 was both a standard high-school textbook and a norm and codification of standard language for the period.

Also at that transition time were the poet, playwright and novelist Mirko Bogović, poet and teacher Dragojla Jarnević, storyteller and collector of folk ballads Mato Vodopić, Vienac editor Ivan Perkovac, poet Luka Botić and philosopher and writer Franjo Marković. Politician and publicist Ante Starčević wrote poetry, plays and literary critiques. Josip Eugen Tomić wrote poems, comedies and historical novels, Rikard Jorgovanić was a poet and storyteller.

Šenoa's requirements to provide literature for the people paved the way for Realism. The cultural framework of the time was bound up with national and political issues, and many young writers were involved with political parties. A large number of writers from the various Croatian provinces helped to bring the new direction into Croatian literature.

The first Croatian author of the new form was Eugen Kumičić, who encountered Realism in Paris. As a writer of Istrian, Zagreb and Croatian history, he moved between romanticism and naturalism in his Olga i Lina (1881). A younger, and more radical, militant writer was Ante Kovačić, who wrote a series of poems, short stories and novels, the best-known of which is U registraturi (In the Register, 1888). The work combines biting social satire with naturalist descriptions of Croatian bureaucracy and peasantry, along with a fascination with the supernatural inherited from Romanticism, and was one of the most powerful novels in 19th-century Croatian literature.

Ksaver Šandor Gjalski dealt with subjects from Zagorje's upper class (Pod starimi krovovi, Under Old Roofs, 1886), affected poetic realism and highlighted the political situation in »U noći« (In the Night, 1887).

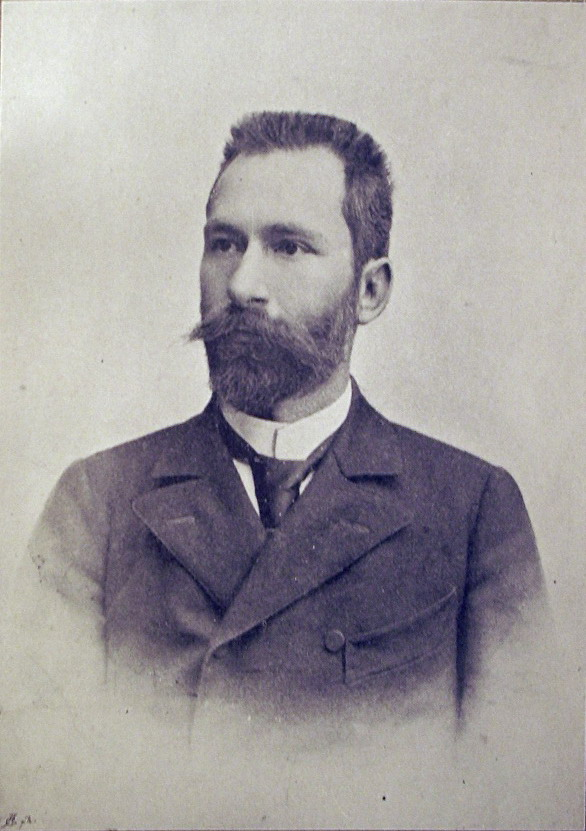
Vjencelav Novak

The most prolific writer of Croatian Realism was Vjenceslav Novak, starting from his hometown in Senj, broadened his range to include Zagreb and Prague. His best novel Posljednji Stipančići (The Last Stipančićs, 1899), dealt with the collapse of a Senj patrician family. Josip Kozarac wrote about the penetration of foreign capital into the previously patriarchal Slavonia (Mrtvi kapitali, Dead Capital, 1890; Tena, 1894). Towards the end of the Realist period, Janko Leskovar wrote his psychological novels, for example Misao na vječnost (1891), in which he would analyse his characters. His work would lead directly into Modernism in Croatian literature.

Silvije Strahimir Kranjčević was the most important of the 19th-century poets: (Bugarkinje, Folk Songs 1885; Izabrane pjesme, Selected Poems 1898; Trzaji, Spasms 1902). Drawing on the style of earlier patriotic poetry, he used sharp sarcasm, cold irony, deep pathos, and rhetoric. He embraced universal and cosmic themes, which made the young Kranjčević stand out among his contemporaries, such as August Harambašić, whose main themes were patriotism or romantic love.

Josip Draženović's Crtice iz primorskoga malogradskoga života (Sketches from a Coastal Small Town Life, 1893) focused on people and their relationships on the Croatian coast at the end of the 19th century. At the threshold of the modernist era, the poet, playwright and novelist Ante Tresić Pavičić brought classical and Italian poetry forms into his work. The collections Valovi misli i čuvstava (Waves of Thought and Emotion, 1903) and Sutonski soneti (Twilight Sonnets, 1904) were to influence some of his younger contemporaries.

== Modern literature ==
=== Modern literature up to 1914 ===
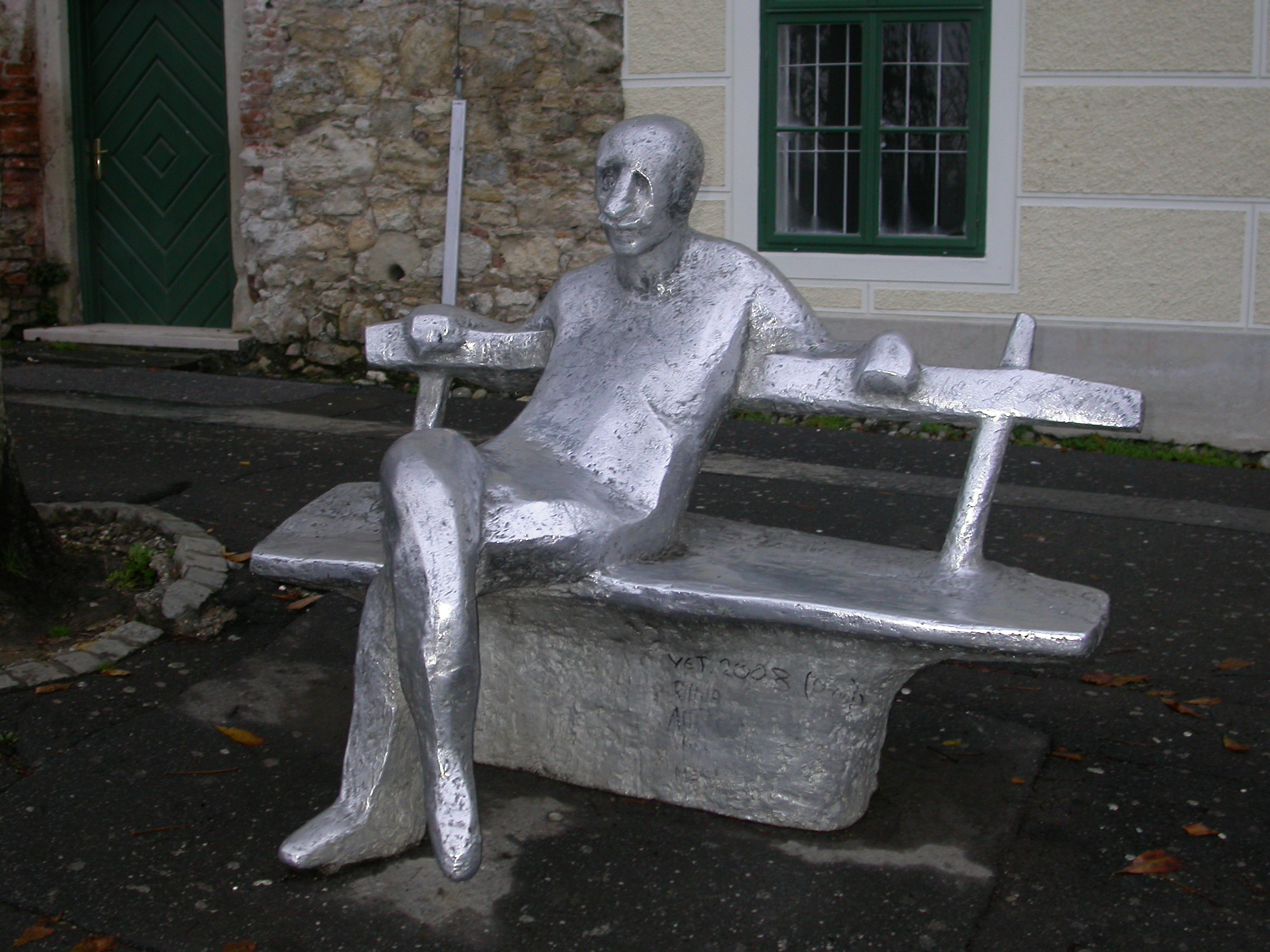
Statue of A.G. Matoš in Zagreb

The modernist movement manifested itself in literature, the visual arts, and other aspects of cultural and national life. From the beginning, there were two distinct threads: one mainly apolitical, cosmopolitan, and aesthetic (Mladost, Hrvatski salon, Život), while the other was younger, more progressive and political (Nova nada, Hrvatska misao, Novo doba, Narodna misao, Glas). A few prominent writers, such as Antun Gustav Matoš and Dinko Šimunović, were not involved in either movement. The difference between "old" and "young" lasted for more than a decade and was related to similar movements in the rest of Europe. In addition, there was a new openness to other influences and literature in French, German, Russian, Italian, Polish and Czech all left their mark.

The struggle for creative freedom in literature and the arts was led by modern idealist Milivoj Dežman (Ivanov). On the other side, Milan Marjanović believed that Croatian literature should be the driving force in the political struggle of the people. Similar thinkers of the time were Ante Kovačić, Silvije Strahimir Kranjčević and Vladimir Nazor. The novelist and playwright Milutin Cihlar Nehajev (Veliki grad, Big City, 1919) wrote a series of essays on national and foreign writers, and his Bijeg (Escape, 1909) is considered typical of Croatian modernist novels with its alienated and confused vision looking to solve national problems by escape.

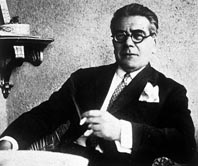
Milan Begović

Modernism was particularly strong in the field of poetry. The freely-expressed eroticism, ecstasy and rebellion against the discipline of life in Milan Begović's Knjiga Boccadoro (Boccadoro Book, 1900) acted as a manifesto and remains a standard of Croatian poetry. Begović's poetry was similar in style to that of Dragutin Domjanić, although Domjanić tended to be more lyrical and sentimental. He achieved some success with his poem Kipci i popevke, (Statuettes and popular songs 1917). Another prominent poet of the period was Vladimir Vidrić, whose work forms part of the wider European symbolism movement.

In theatre, Ivo Vojnović captivated the public with plays such as Ekvinocij (Equinox, 1895). Although his early works dealt with cosmopolitan themes, Dubrovnik remained his major inspiration, especially in Dubrovačka trilogija (Dubrovnik Trilogy, 1903). The subject relates to realism in that work, although the technique and inspiration is entirely modernist.

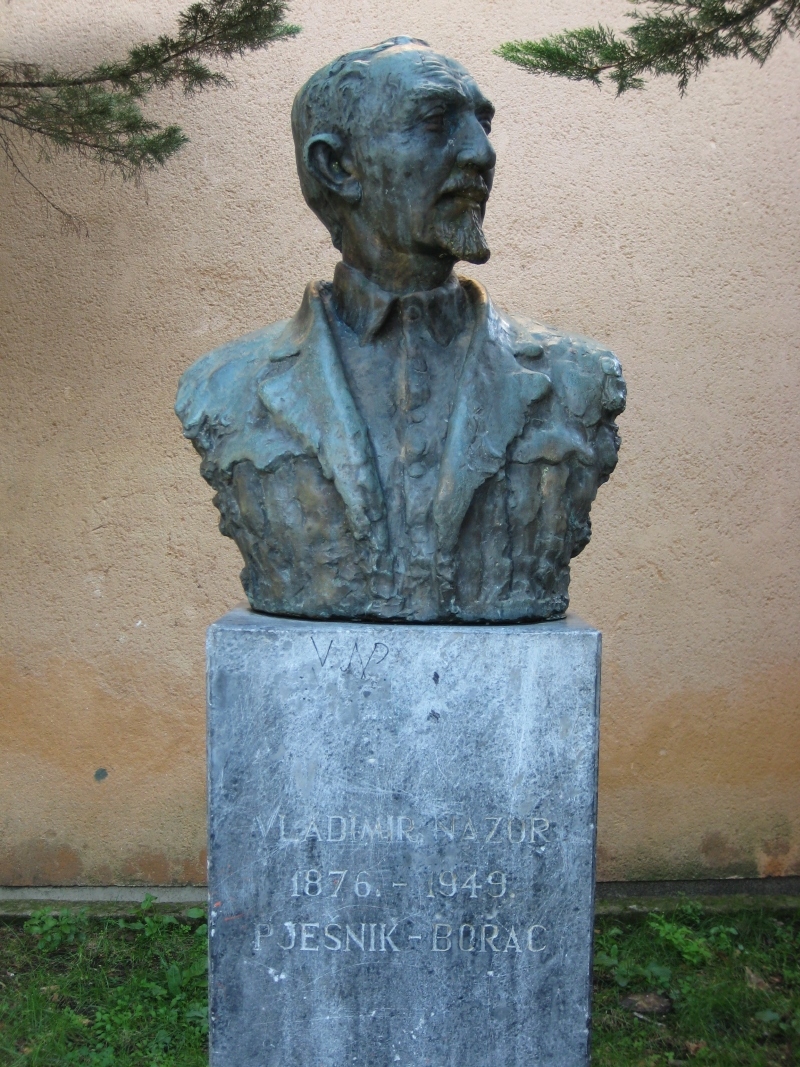
Vladimir Nazor

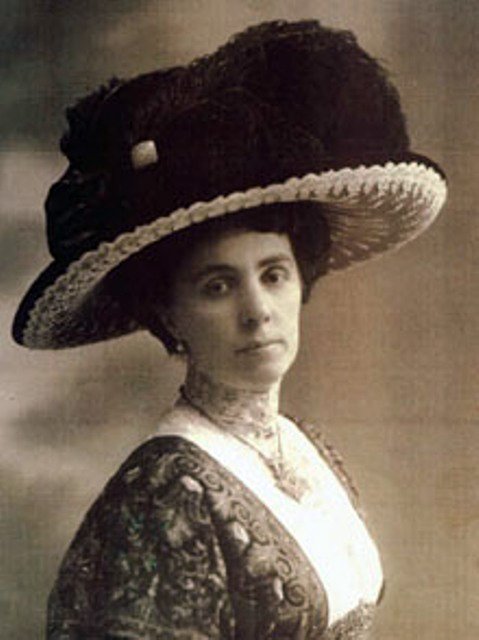
Ivana Brlić-Mažuranić

Around the same time, Vladimir Nazor began his career and became one of the most versatile and prolific authors of the modern age (Slavenske legende, Slavic Legends, 1900). His writing is modernist, though based on a realist tradition. Some of the most outstanding narrative prose was written by Dinko Šimunović, whose novels described life in the rural hinterland of Dalmatia.

Two very successful playwrights of the time were Milan Ogrizović and Josip Kosor. Ogrizović used themes from folk songs in works such as (Hasanaginica), and he also wrote passionate dramas ("Vučina", 1921), while Kosor is best known for his dramatic Požar strasti (Fire of Passion, 1912).

The novelist Franjo Horvat Kiš wrote about life in the Croatian zagorje, while Ivan Kozarac wrote the novel Đuka Begović (Devil's Blood, 1911) about Slavonia. The forerunner of modern fiction was Janko Polić Kamov, poet (Psovka, Ištipana hartija, 1907), narrator, innovative novelist (Isušena kaljuža 1957), playwright essayist and critic. His prose remains essentially modern even today in both its structure and subject.

The most complete European and Croatian writer of the period was Antun Gustav Matoš, who wrote his first short story in 1892, Moć savjesti (The Power of Conscience). His work spanning essays, reviews, novels, poems, and travel books was highly influential. The publication of the anthology Croatian Young Lyrics (1914) marked the end of an era – the year that Antun Gustav Matoš died and the First World War began. Twelve authors contributed to the anthology: Ivo Andrić, Vladimir Čerina, Vilko Gabarić, Karl Hausler, Zvonko Milković, Stjepan Parmačević, Janko Polić Kamov, Tin Ujević, Milan Vrbanić, Ljubo Wiesner and Fran Galović. All of these authors were influenced by Antun Gustav Matoš and Vladimir Vidrić, and many would later become well-known names in Croatian literature. Fran Galović, a prolific writer of modern novels and plays, was also known for poems in his native Podravina dialect (Z mojih bregov, From My Hills, published in 1925). Vladimir Čerina was best known for his poems Raspeće, Crucifixion, 1912. Ivana Brlić-Mažuranić achieved success as a writer of Croatian fairytales (Priče iz divine, Fairytales, 1916), which interweave fantasy with real characters. The journalist Marija Jurić Zagorka wrote historical novels that achieved great popularity. A. G. Matoš, in this period, published critical reviews Naši ljudi i krajevi (Our People and Regions, 1910) and Pečalba (Profit, 1913), and wrote serials and poems.

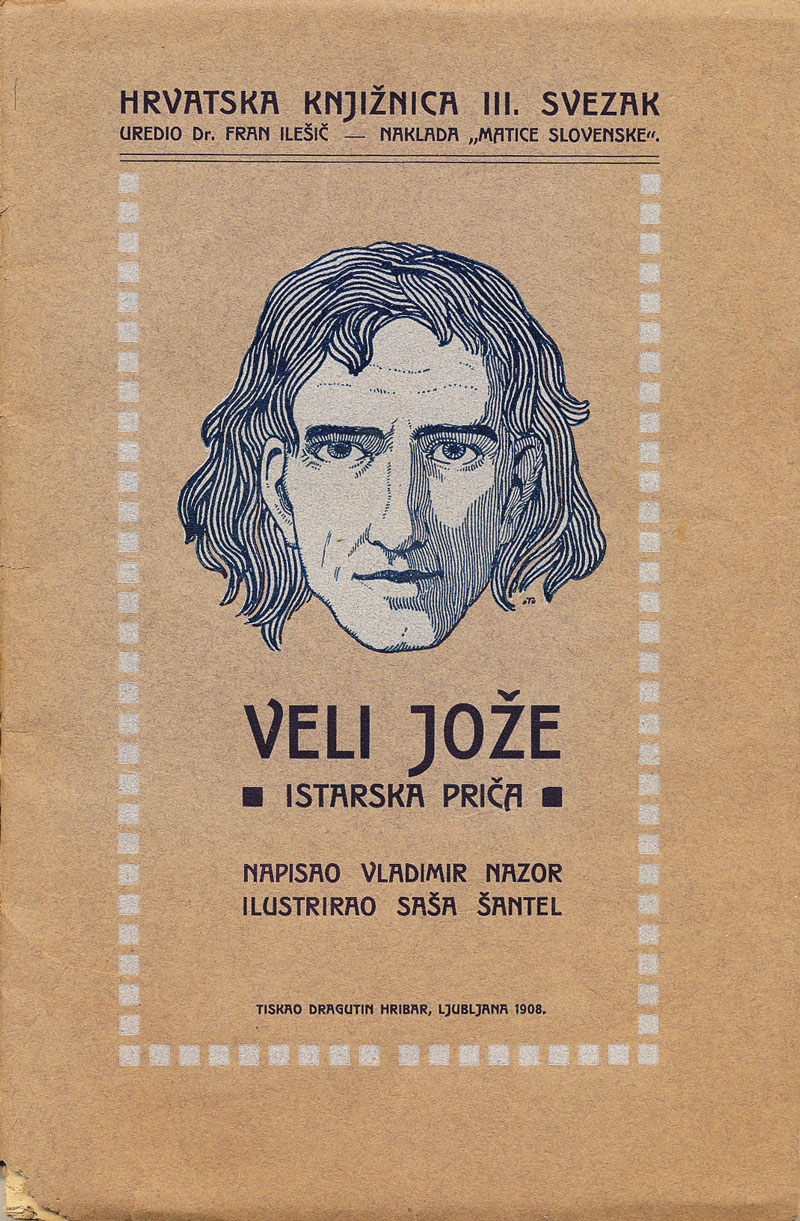
Veli Jože, firs-edition cover. The story of Veli Jože is one of Nazor's best-known works

The political events of the early 20th century and the movement for a united south Slavic state (Yugoslavia) were compelling topics in the literature of the time. Ivo Vojnović wrote about the Vidovdan myth, while Srđan Tucić published Osloboditelje (Liberators, 1914). Vladimir Nazor wrote several works on the theme of Croatian history Velog Jože (1908), Hrvatski kraljevi (Croatian Kings, 1912), Istarske priče (Istrian Tales, 1913) and Medvjeda Brundu (Bear Brundu, 1915). Milan Ogrizović's play Banović Strahinja was shown in 1912.

=== Modern literature between the wars 1914 to 1945 ===
The period immediately before the First World War was marked by a new avant-garde movement. Janko Polić Kamov, in his short life, was an early forerunner, with his modernist novel Isušena kaljuža (The Drained Swamp, 1906–1909) now considered to be the first major Croatian prose work of the genre. A new generation of futurist young writers began to appear, where expressive use of words was more important than a formal structure. Along with the new literary styles, came a stronger politicization of content that would continue to mark poetry and prose during the First World War and beyond.

==== Literary magazines and Matica hrvatska ====
The magazine Vihor (Whirlwind, 1914) gathered together a group of young writers who supported the unification of the South Slavs. In this, they were strongly influenced by the expressive and ideological works of sculptor Ivan Meštrović and writers Ivo Vojnović and Vladimir Nazor, who, before the First World War, had revived common Slavic mythology. Avant-garde poetry was published in a number of magazines, for example, Kokot (1916), Vijavica (1917), Juriš (1919) and Književnik (1924). Along with the avant-garde, mainly expressionist poetry, Leninist revolutionary ideas were promoted in magazines such as Plamen (1919) and Zenit (1921–23 in Zagreb; 1924–26 in Belgrade). Ljubo Micić was the most radical promoter of the avant-garde in literature, music, and art, advocating Zenitism as a synthesis of the original Balkan spirit and contemporary European trends (futurism, expressionism, dadaism, surrealism).

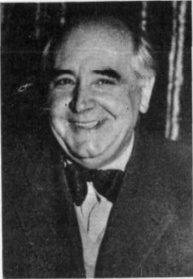
Miroslav Krleža in 1953

In addition to these avant-garde magazines, a significant contribution to the literary life of the period role was played by DHK Savremenik (published intermittently 1906–41), which gathered together writers of different generations and poetic orientations, Hrvatska njiva (1917–26; from 1919 Jugoslavenska njiva) offered more moderately traditional poetic viewpoints as in Vijenac (Wreath, 1913–28). The magazine Nova Evropa (1920–41), with its liberal and south Slav unity orientation, strongly impacted the first half of the 1920s. Miroslav Krleža In 1923, he launched his second magazine, Književna republika (Literary Republic, banned in 1927), bringing together leading leftist writers, focusing on inequality and social injustice, offering a sharp critique of the ruling regime in Yugoslavia.

After the assassination of Stjepan Radić and the introduction of the dictatorship at the beginning of 1929, consciousness of a Croatian identity strengthened among many writers, along with a growing resistance to Serbian dominance. Since normal public safety orders limited legitimate political activities, the movement found expression in cultural associations and literary publications. Matica hrvatska became the centre of intellectual and literary gatherings, within which Communist writers such as Miroslav Krleža and August Cesarec were active. Their magazine Hrvatska revija (Croatian Review, 1928) provided the Croatian literary voice of the time, bringing together the best authors of all orientations. However, the Matica administration gradually eased out the leftist writers, particularly after Filip Lukas' article Ruski komunizam spram nacionalnog principal (Russian Communism as opposed to National Principles, 1933).

Those with strong nationalistic views moved to magazines such as Hrvatska smotra (Croatian Folklore, 1933–45), and Hrvatska prosvjeta (Croatian education, 1914–40), while most leftist Croatian authors gathered around Književnici (Writers, 1928–39), which in its early years was open to liberal ideas, then around the journal Kritika (1928), Literatura (1931–33), Kultura (1933) and Izraz (Expression, 1939–41).

==== Increasing conflict ====
Towards the end of the 1920s and into the 1930s, turmoil within the international leftist movement (clashes at the First International Conference of Proletarian and Revolutionary Writers (1927), Kharkiv Congress (1930), Moscow Congress of Soviet Writers (1934) between leftist avant-garde authors and those engaged in writing social literature, i.e. propaganda) had its echoes in Yugoslavia. The most prominent left-wing author, Miroslav Krleža, found himself in conflict with the authorities as he refused to lower his standards, as he saw it, and become a mere tool for ideological goals. The debate grew increasingly heated while Krleža was publishing the magazine Danas (Today, 1934) and Pečat (Stamp, 1939–40), culminating in his highly critical essay Dijalektički antibarbarus (Dialectical antibarbarus, 1939), which brought him into direct conflict with the leadership of the Communist Party of Yugoslavia (who responded by publishing the collection Književne sveske (Literary Volume, 1940)).

==== Second World War ====
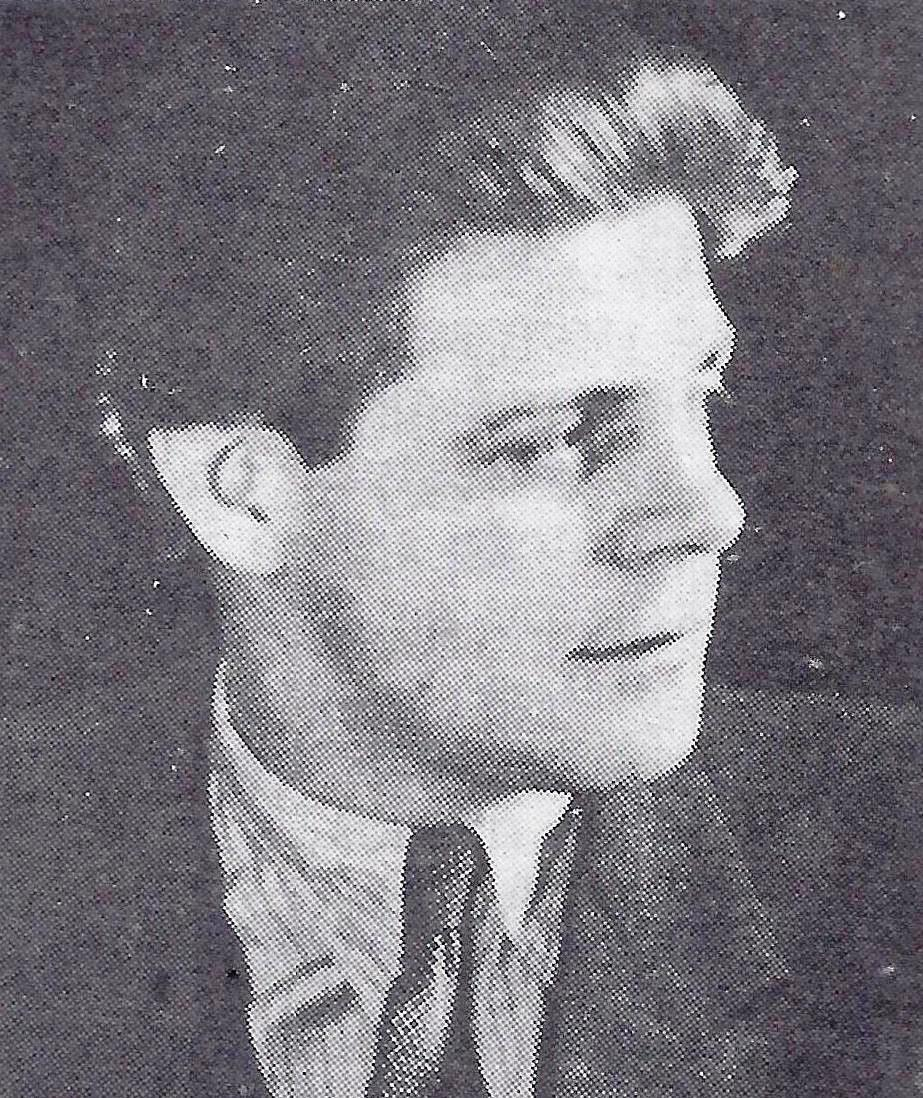
Ivan Goran Kovačić

The establishment of the Independent State of Croatia (NDH) in 1941 brought hope amongst some that the end of monarchist Yugoslavia would unleash a new creative energy. But the fascist ideology, the strong link to the Axis powers, the repressive practices of the Ustasha regime towards intellectuals (including the murder of Cesarec, Keršovani, Miškina and a slew of others), and the persecution of Communists and members of national minorities, pushed Croatia's intellectuals to distance themselves from the regime. Even some leading non-communist writers such as Vladimir Nazor and Ivan Goran Kovačić joined the partisans. While leftist writers who had not been murdered, such as Krleža, were banned altogether from publishing, the Ustasha authorities attempted to organize a literary presence around the Croatian Publishing and Bibliographic Institute, which issued an anthology of poetry and prose, Hrvatska enciklopedija (Croatian encyclopedia). In the territory under partisan control, there was intense literary activity. In addition to Vladimir Nazor and Ivan Goran Kovačić there were Joža Horvat, Mirko Božić, Jure Kaštelan, Ivan Dončević, Jure Franičević Pločar, Marin Franičević, Vjekoslav Kaleb, Vladimir Popović, Živko Jeličić, Josip Barković and others. Although most of their literary output was fairly utilitarian, artistic masterpieces came from this time, such as Kovačić's intensely emotional indictment of war crimes Jama (The Pit, 1944).

==== Leading writers and their best-known works ====
- Bosnian Croat Ivo Andrić was one of the gifted poets introduced in the 1914 anthology Croatian Young Lyrics. However, after his relocation to Belgrade, he worked in Serbian literature. His early works Ex Ponto (1918), Put Ali Đerzeleza (The Path of Ali Đerzelez, 1920), Nemiri (Unrest, 1921) were written in Croatian Ijekavian dialect (which also sometimes appeared in his later works, especially in the speech of Bosnian friars). He published three prose collections in Belgrade, Pripovetke (Stories, 1924, 1931, 1936). Stylistically virtuous, with an exaggerated sense of psychological analysis pervaded by unobtrusiveness, his prose analyzed civilization and religious controversy on Bosnian soil. Taken with his post-war novels, his work earned him worldwide recognition, crowned by the Nobel Prize in 1961.
- Đuro Arnold was a writer of romantic poetry in the tradition of August Šenoa and Franjo Marković, publishing several books of poems. Na pragu vječnosti (Threshold of Eternity, 1935)
- Mate Balota wrote many books and discussions on foreign and domestic trade theory, agrarian economics, industrial policy, the history of the economy, etc. His scientific works include Trgovina i unutrašnja trgovinska politika (1931), Industrijska politika (1936), Ekonomska struktura Jugoslavije 1918–1941 (1950) and Ekonomska historija Jugoslavije (1958). His literary works include Dragi kamen (1938), Tijesna zemlja: roman iz istarskog narodnog života (1946) and the travelogues published posthumously Na crvenoj istarskoj zemlji (1979).
- Milan Begović worked as a high school professor in Split before moving to Hamburg and Vienna to pursue a career in theatre. He wrote stories and novels but is best known for his plays in the 1920s and 1930s. The best-known titles are Pustolov pred vratima (Adventurer at the Door, 1926) and the comedy Amerikanska jahta u Splitskoj luci (American Yacht in Split Harbour).
- his right-wing politics strongly mark Mile Budak's work. A prominent member of the Ustasha movement, the founder of the newspaper Hrvatski narod (Croatian People) in 1938, and a Minister within the NDH Government, he published literary works intensively in 1930–45. His most significant work deals with a Lika village and the disintegration of traditional values within a closed patriarchal community Opanci dida Vidurine (Grandpa Vidurina's shoes, 1933), Ognjište (Fireplace, I-IV, 1938), Kresojića (Strain, I-III, 1944–45). He also wrote social novels in which he analyzed the urban environment Direktor Križanić (Director Križanić, 1938), Rascvjetana trešnja (Cherry Blossom I-IV, 1939), and a memoir Ratno roblje (Prisoners of war I-II, 1941). Budak was hanged for crimes against humanity after the war.
- The poet Dobriša Cesarić inherited the spirit of romance (translated Russian and German romantics), and on a stylistic-expressive plan, he inherited the poets of Croatian modernity, wrote a related verse with a strong sense of verse music. In his poems, he took on landscape scenes that had a symbolic function, and his seemingly simple poetry gained a deeper, philosophical meaning. He also dealt with scenes from the life of the urban poor as part of the social movement literature in his collection Lirika (Poetry, 1931), Spasena svijetla (Saved World, 1938). He achieved great popularity in the wider reading circles.
- Dragutin Domjanić wrote romantic poetry about spiritual love and the nobles and cavaliers of the days gone by. Kipci i popevke (Statuettes and pop songs, 1917), Po dragomu kraju ("Through the region", 1933)
- Ulderiko Donadini was a versatile author, writing poems, novels and essays. A follower of Matoš's symbolist-impressionist poetics, he was impressed by Dostoyevsky, and his works combine the spirit of the grotesque with some extremely neurotic characters. He published the collection Lude priče (Crazy Stories, 1915), a series of novels Vijavice (Whirlwind, 1917), Kroz šibe (Through the brush, 1921), Bauk (Bogeyman, 1922), dramas Bezdan (The Abyss, 1919), Igračka oluje (Toy storm, 1921). Gogoljeva smrt ("Gogol's death", 1921).
- Viktor Car Emin wrote numerous novels and stories dealing with the economic-social and political problems of Istria's past and present. Nove borbe (New Struggle, 1926), Vitez Mora (Hero of the Sea, 1939). He dealt with the same topics in his works for the theatre.
- August Cesarec was a versatile author, poet, novelist, playwright, and political publicist. Politically he belonged to the Leninist left, he was passionately engaged in social controversies. A more critical realism gradually replaced the expressionist style of his early poetry and prose as he addressed issues such as the Croatian national identity and social injustice Careva kraljevina (The Emperor's Kingdom, 1925), Zlatni mladić (Golden Youth, 1928), Bjegunci (Fugitives, 1933).
- Milutin Cihlar Nehajev was a journalist, novelist and dramatist. Veliki grad (Big City, 1919), Vuci (Wolves, 1928)
- Vjekoslav Kaleb depicted the environment and people of the Dalmatian hinterland with a sparse expressionist style in his novels Na kamenju (On the Rock, 1940) and Izvan stvari (Outside of Things, 1942).
- Slavko Kolar analyzed life in Croatian villages and provinces with remarkable humour. His best series of novels were Ili jesmo ili nismo (Either we are or not, 1933) and Mi smo za pravicu (We are for justice, 1936), which explored the fate of characters who live in conditions of total deprivation, satirizing provincial intelligence and bureaucracy, particularly political careerism and opportunism.
- Although the first collection of poems of Gustav Krklec (1899–1977) had expressionist elements (Lirika Poetry, 1919; Srebrna cesta (Silver Road, 1921), his poetic sensibility was more suited to traditionalist, impressionistic expression and linked verse Izlet u nebo (Trip to Heaven, 1928; Darovi za Bezimenu (Gifts for nameless, 1942). His wit is especially prominent in epigrams and pamphlets.
- Josip Kosor was a novelist and playwright. Starting with novels depicting peasant life in Dalmatia, he evolved into a dramatist, being nominated for the Nobel Prize in Literature three times. His plays Passion's Furnace (1912), The Invincible Ship (1921) and Reconciliation were translated for performance in England. Other works include Žena (Woman, 1920), Razvrat (Debauchery, 1923), Miris zemlje i mora ( Scent of Earth and Sea, 1925)
- Ivan Goran Kovačić, a poet, storyteller, critic and journalist, advocated HSS politics and followed Stjepan Radić. In an early novel, Dani gnjeva (Days of Anger, 1936), he wrote about his native Lukovdol, poetizing the harmony of nature and man, critically treating social injustice. In the poems published in the posthumous book Ognji i rože (Fire and Roses, 1945), he uses dialect to depict the arkadian landscapes of his native country. He achieved exceptional expression in his best-known poem Jama (The Pit, 1944), a strong work of universal artistic value and a shocking testimony of war crime.
- Ivo Kozarčanin, poet, critic and novelist, reached his artistic peak in the novels Tuđa žena (Someone Else's Wife, 1937) and, especially Sam čovjek (Man Alone, 1937) dealing with the psychological analysis of neurotic characters struggling to adapt to everyday life. His poems are interspersed with intense eroticism and a feeling of loneliness, Mrtve oči (Dead Eyes, 1938).
- Miroslav Krleža played a central role in literary life between the two world wars, based not only on his extensive output but also on having a wider public engagement driven by the magazines he published and his contributions to debates on cultural and political issues. His influence and popularity among the younger intellectuals can be seen in the number of his followers, known as the krležijanci. During the First World War, he wrote a series of avant-garde dramas called Kraljevo (King), Kristofor Kolumbo (Christopher Columbus), Michelangelo Buonarroti (Michelangelo) and poetry based on free verse and expressive imagery Three Symphonies, 1917; Songs I and Songs II, 1918; Songs III and Lirika (Poetry, 1919). In the period after World War I, he published an anti-war novel in the series "Croatian God Mars". In the second half of the 1920s, in the Glembay cycle (drama "In Agony", "Glembays," "Leda"), he analyzed the crisis of consciousness of the civic class using psychological realism. In the novels "The Return of Philip Latinowicz" (1932) and "The Edge of Reason" (1938), he dealt with the fate of a sensitive individual confronted with the social environment, and "Banquet in Blitva" (I., 1938, II., 1939), explored the conflict between an individual and despotic political authorities. By reviving the language of old Kajkavian literature, in "Balade Petrice Kerempuha" (1936) he created a complex picture of Croatian history. He also published a series of essay books, travelogues and controversies, with great public acclaim.
- Vjekoslav Majer is a poet of Zagreb scenes, close to Matoš, depicting the everyday life of the small man with social sensitivity and warm humour. Poetry collections Lirika (Poetry, 1924) and Pjesme zabrinutog Evropejca (Songs of a Worried European, 1934). Prose Iz dnevnika malog Perice (From the diary of little Perica, 1935), Pepić u vremenu i prostoru (Pepić in time and space, 1935–38), Život puža (Life of a snail, 1938), Dnevnik Očenašeka (Diary of Očenašeka, 1938).
- Milan Marjanović Vladimir Nazor kao nacionalni pjesnik (Vladimir Nazor as National Poet, 1923), Stjepan Radić (Stjepan Radic, 1937), Mi budale (We Fools, 1939)
- Vladimir Nazor Arkun (1920), Niza od koralja (String of Coral, 1922), Nove priče (New Tales, 1922–26), Priče s ostrva, iz grada i sa planine, "Tales from island, city and mountain, 1927), Pjesme moje mladosti (Songs of my youth, 1930), Fantazije i groteske (Fantasies and grotesque, 1931).
- Ante Tresić Pavičić Govori i pisma iz ere užasa i oslobođenja (Speeches and letters from a time of exile and liberation, 1922), Ivan Meštrović (Ivan Mestrović, 1925), Plavo cvijeće Blue Flowers, 1928)
- Đuro Sudeta wrote melancholy verses imbued with Christian spirituality in his collections Osamljene staze (Lonely Tracks, 1924) and Kućice u dolu (Houses in the Valley, 1926), in which he dealt with his own childhood, loneliness and foreboding imminent death. One of his best-known works is the fantasy narrative Mor (1930).
- Ksaver Šandor Gjalski Ljubav lajtnanta Milića (The Love of Lieutenant Milić, 1923), Pronevjereni ideali (Betrayed Ideals, 1925).
- In his short life Antun Branko Šimić wrote one of the most outstanding poetic and critical-essay works of Croatian literature. Initially writing impressionist poetry using symbolism and German Expressionism, he achieved his best work in poems written in stark verse, with no verbal ornamentation, about the human body's transience and the poor's life. During his lifetime, he published a collection, Preobraženja (Transfiguration, 1920) and posthumously Izabrane pjesme (Selected Poems, 1933). He criticized the radical rejection of Croatian classics (Preradović, Vidrić, Vojnović, Nazor), but also the younger contemporaries (Andrić, Krleža).
- Dinko Šimunović spent most of his life in the hinterland of Dalmatia, writing many stories and two novels dealing with people from his native region. Mladost (Youth, 1921), Porodica Vinčić (Vinčić Family, 1923).
- Nikola Šop's poetry was imbued with a profound spirituality, depicting love for the world of ordinary, small people, the poor and vagrants. He introduced a Jesus character into the everyday life of a small man Pjesme siromašnog sina (Poems of the Poor Son, 1926), Isus i moja sjena (Jesus and My Shadow, 1934), Za kasnim stolom (For the Late Table, 1943). In his later poems, he left the topic of earthly joy and dealt with the symbolism of astral spaces.
- Dragutin Tadijanović dealt with themes of lost childhood, employing a simplicity of language and intentionally naive views evocative of the subject. Lirika (Poetry, 1931), Sunce nad oranicama (Sun over the fields, 1933), Pepeo srca (Ashes of the heart, 1936), Dani djetinjstva (Days of Childhood, 1937), and Tuga zemlje (Sadness of the Earth, 1942).
- Grigorije Vitez is best remembered as the author of Children's poetry and other forms of literature for children and youth.
- Leading peacetime poet Tin Ujević began his career in 1914, with his contributions to the anthology Hrvatska mlada lirika (Croatian Young Lyrics). During World War I, he was politically engaged as a Yugoslav nationalist, but after the war, he became disillusioned, leaving politics to devote himself to literature as a professional writer and translator. In addition to poetry, he wrote short stories, essays on foreign and domestic writers, prose, and newspaper articles. He was close to Matoš in his early poetry, later taking inspiration from Baudelaire, Rimbaud and Whitman. Like other contemporary poets, he made use of highly-stylized folk tales, creating emotional expressions of personal tragedy, loneliness and intense passionate love, especially in Lelek sebra (Cry of Silver, 1920), and Kolajna (Medals, 1926). Apart from surrealist imagery, his later poem Auto na korzu (Car on the Promenade, 1932) is also distinguished by the philosophy of reflexivity. A representative collection of his poetry Ojađeno zvono (Stolen Bell, 1933), a selection of erudite essays and pamphlets Ljudi za vratima gostionice (People at the inn door, 1938) and Skalpel kaosa (Scalpel chaos, 1938) established Ujević as an outstanding poet of the interwar years.

=== Modern literature post Second World War ===
==== Post-war political changes ====
Literary life in the years immediately after the Second World War was marked by change: following the collapse of the Ustasha government, many writers went into exile. Those who had held high office in the NDH were put on trial, and Mile Budak was sentenced to death as a war criminal. Within the Croatian Writers' Association, radical changes occurred, with some members temporarily banned from publication. Those who had been involved in the partisan movement now took on a leading role. The journal Republika (Republic, 1945) was launched, intended as the new central platform of literary life. Leading leftist writer, Miroslav Krleža, who had not been active in the partisans due to a disagreement with the Communist Party leadership, gradually became re-engaged in public life. His role was considerably strengthened following Yugoslavia's break with Stalin, and in 1950, he founded the Leksikografski zavod FNRJ (known today as the Miroslav Krleža Institute of Lexicography) in Zagreb.

==== Socialist Realism ====
In those first years after the war, socialist realism dominated all arts fields. Agitprop (political propaganda) had a great influence on literary output and cultural life in general. In this, some of the leading writers of the partisans were active. Social realism writing left its mark in criticism and essays, although novels were rare. In the immediate post-war years, poetry was particularly popular. For example Marin Franičević’s Govorenje Mikule Trudnega (Speaking of Mikula Trudneg), Vladimir Popović’s Oči (Eyes), Jure Kaštelan's Tifusari (Tifusari), Živko Jeličić’s Koliba u inju (Hut in Inja), Oto Šolc's, Noć (Night). Common themes were the uprising of the Croatians and the peasants' fight against social injustice. Also popular were collections of stories about the Partisan War (Ivan Dončević Bezimeni (No name), Joža Horvat Za pobjedu (For victory), and Vjekoslav Kaleb Brigada (Brigade), and plays that had first been performed at partisan events during the war.

Works published outside the social realist genre included novels by Petar Šegedin Djeca božja (Children of God, 1946) and Osamljenici (Recluse, 1947), the poems of Vesna Parun Zore i vihori (Dawn and Whirlwinds, 1947), short stories by Ranko Marinković Proze (Prose, 1948), the novel of Vladan Desnica Zimsko ljetovanje (Winter Holidays, 1950). In 1945, Ivo Andric published three novels that were to bring him world acclaim: Na Drini ćuprija (Bridge on the Drina), Travnička hronika (Grass Chronicles) and Gospođica (Maiden).

==== Émigré writers ====
Émigré writers in Argentina got together to revive the Matica hrvatska journal that had been banned in Croatia by the communist authorities. Franjo Nevistić and Vinko Nikolić in Buenos Aires launched a half-monthly "Hrvatska" (Croatia), while Nikolić and Antun Bonifačić founded the "Hrvatska revija" (Croatian review, 1951–1966 in Buenos Aires, 1966–1991 in Paris, Munich and Barcelona). Notable contributors included: Ivan Meštrović, Mate Meštrović, Eugen Dido Kvaternik, Bogdan Radica, Milan Blažeković, Franjo Kuharić, Dominik Mandić, Rajmund Kupareo, Ante Ciliga, Vladko Maček, Džafer Kulenović, Alija Nametak, Asaf Duraković, Savić Marković Štedimlija, and Franjo Tuđman. In Argentina also, Krleža's former colleague from the journal Pečata (Stamp), Viktor Vida (1913–60), wrote books influenced by Italian hermeticism, which have been published in Croatia since the early 1970s.

==== Increasing freedom of expression ====
At the start of the 1950s, following the break of the Yugoslav leadership with Stalin, the rigid pressure of ideology in literature was gradually lifted. This freedom of expression was marked in 1952 by Krleža in his speech at the III Congress of the Yugoslav Writers' Union in Ljubljana. He announced the birth of a new era, one that allowed freedom of choice for expressive means, an opening up to western influences and a somewhat more open treatment of literary themes (not permitted was any criticism of the political system, the Communist government and Josip Broz Tito himself).

A number of writers began to establish the character of Croatian literature in the second half of the 20th century. Petar Šegedin was a writer of highly intellectual fiction, the best-known of which is the so-called "existentialist trilogy", which forms part of the novels Crni smiješak (Black Smile, 1969). He also published a series of short stories, novels, essays and travel books, his essays challenging the Croatian national question Svi smo mi odgovorni (We are all responsible, 1971).

Vladan Desnica published four collections of novels, which are usually classified into two thematic series: realistic concepts of the Dalmatian environment and maternally structured meditative prose. His work culminated in some of the best Croatian prose, the modernist concept of the Proljeća Ivana Galeba (The Spring of John Seagull, 1957), a series of essays in which he addressed the issue of artistic creation.

Ranko Marinković is representative of Croatian modernist authors. Writing with a virtuoso style, his work is marked by a refined irony. He dealt with the conflict of a sensitive individual in middle age, unable to achieve an authentic identity. A versatile writer, he tried his hand at different genres as a novelist "Ruke" (Hands, 1953), a dramatist Glorija (Gloria, 1956), a novelist Kiklop (Cyclops, 1965), and essayist Geste i Grimase (Gestures and Grimaces, 1951).

Vesna Parun is the author of fifty poetry collections and a book of prose and drama. Her love poetry is characterised by its attenuated sensuality and lush depictions of nature. In her later collections, she developed a tendency towards satire.

Jure Kaštelan was a poet who depicted themes of childhood and homeland, combining Ujević-Matošević traditions with oral poetry and surrealistic imagery. Poet and dramatist Radovan Ivšić wrote surrealist works that are considered early forerunners of 1970s surrealism. Surrealist elements also appeared in the poetry of Šime Vučetić, whose work was primarily focused on his own inner struggles and delusions.

The poetry of Drago Ivanišević initially showed influences of surrealism and Italian hermeticism, later writing in more personal style in his chakavian verses of the 1970s. Poet Marin Franičević wrote socially engaged verses in the chakavian dialect, later turning to intimate landscape motifs. Jure Franičević Pločar wrote poetry in the čakav and Štokav dialects, but established himself primarily as a novelist, with a series of books about the NOB period, written without sentiment, based on the complex psychological states of the characters. Joža Horvat dealt with war themes in humorous narratives, while his later works dealt with his own obsession with nature, hunting and adventure sailing. Mirko Božić is best known for his "Kurlan" novel trilogy depicting the life of the poor in the Dalmatian hinterland, with a keen sense of character portrayal in an expressive style based on the local stokavian dialect enriched with invented expressions. He also distinguished himself as a playwright. Pero Budak was the author of several dramas about rural life in Lika, with a pronounced comic touch, very popular in the 1950s.

Živko Jeličić wrote a series of short stories and novels in a modernist narrative structure. Ivan Raos was a prolific writer of short-stories, novelist and playwright, in a variety of styles from humour mixed with realistic narrative, to modernist experimentation. Vojin Jelić dealt with themes of life in the Knin district, using a modernist narrative. Marijan Matković was best-known as a playwright, whose best works are considered to be his dramatic texts with historical themes.

==== Krugovi (Circles) group ====
During the 1950s, the journal Krugovi (Circles, 1952–58), led by a group of young writers born around 1930, played a major role in developing Croatian literature. Together, they counteracted the policies of socialist realism and opened the door to wide-ranging influences from the rest of the world, from surrealism, Russian avant-gardists, and existentialism to American so-called hard-boiled prose. Their ironic style was a symptom of post-war optimism fading, most likely influenced by American novelists and critics, who saw a basic poetic quality in irony. Among the writers of this generation, the most significant prose was written by Slobodan Novak, in his collections Izgubljeni zavičaj (Lost Homeland, 1955), Tvrdi grad (Hard City, 1961), Izvanbrodski dnevnik (Outboard Diary, 1977) and the novel Mirisi, zlato i tamjan (Scents, Gold and Incense, 1968) in which he dealt with the dilemmas of the modern intellectual, with a sense of existential absurdity. Novak demonstrates a distinct sense of psychological shading in his characters and a sophisticated imaging of the native Mediterranean ambience.

Slavko Mihalić, was a leading poet of the Circles group, author of twenty collections of poetry, beginning with Komorne muzike (Chamber Music, 1954). He was preoccupied with the idea of human loss and the struggle to achieve an authentic existence, which he portrayed in a series of semantically layered images.

Ivan Slamnig, was the author of numerous collections of poetry Aleja poslije svečanosti (Alley after the ceremony, 1956), Odron (Landslide, 1956), Naronska siesta (Narona siesta, 1963), the novel Bolja polovica hrabrosti (Better half of courage, 1972), collections of short stories, radio drama, was prone to puns and irony, and his poetry is full of intellectual references.

Antun Šoljan was a poet, novelist, playwright, critic, feuilletonist, anthologist, editor of several journals, and translator. His novels include Izdajice (Traitor, 1961), Kratki izlet (Short Trip, 1965), and Luka (Port, 1974). Familiar with contemporary trends in world literature, he wrote modernist poetry that reworked myths, legends, and classical motifs and forms.

Milivoj Slaviček was another extremely prolific poet, using everyday expressions to describe seemingly small things, imbuing scenes of ordinary life with elements of lyrical meditation.

Irena Vrkljan was also a poet inspired by surrealism, whose greatest success was achieved in her 1980s confessional, feminist-inspired novel. The poetry of Vesna Krmpotić was concerned with a search for the mystical symbols of life.

Vlado Gotovac was characterized by a highly intellectual type of writing; critics often called him the "philosophical poet". He was close to the upcoming generation of new writers in the 1960s as editor of the Hrvatski tjednik (Croatian Weekly), a cult publication in the period of the Croatian Spring. He passionately advocated the idea of liberal democracy and Croatian national emancipation.

Ivan Kušan wrote stories for children with the main character, a boy called Kok. He also wrote some notable works for adults, prose and drama, based on his linguistic and stylistic virtuosity and wit that occasionally become happy pastiches of literary stereotypes from domestic and world literature. Other authors of children's literature include Zvonimir Balog, Sunčana Škrinjarić, Nada Iveljić and Višnja Stahuljak.

Predrag Matvejević explores the tradition of leftist literature and polemically analyzes current issues of cult politics. He succeeded internationally with the lexicographical work Mediteranski brevijar (Mediterranean Breviary, 1987). He produced at the end of the 1970s a series of historical novels inspired by the phrases and themes of old travel books and chronicles, folk literature and Ivo Andrić’s narrative technique. In the 1990s, he wrote books in which he confronted the opponents of HDZ policy.

==== Razlog (Reason) group ====
In the early 1960s, the magazine Razlog (Reason, 1961–68) and the associated library featured writers born mainly around 1940, characterized by a pronounced awareness of generational and aesthetic distinctiveness from other groups within Croatian literature. Reason's authors typically relied on philosophical discourse (so the group included somewhat older, more philosophical writers such as Vlado Gotovac, Bruno Popović, Branislav Zeljković) and initially were strongly influenced by Heidegger and the French existentialists, and by the late 1960s also by structuralist ideas. They tended to write more criticism and poetry than longer prose forms. "Reason" critiques were not only concerned with literature but attempted to interpret the phenomenon of art altogether. Boundaries between poetry and essays were removed: their favourite form of poetry was in prose, using themes derived from modern or analysis of the process of artistic creation or the phenomenon of literacy.

One of the key exponents was Zvonimir Mrkonjić, who began in the 1960s as a poet, relying on the experience of Europeans, particularly French modernism. He was significant as a critic and anthologist, seeking to reinterpret ideas about post-war Croatian poetry, affirming some previously neglected early modernists (Radovan Ivšić, Josip Stošić ) and writers who built autonomous poetic worlds, especially Nikola Šop.

Danijel Dragojević is considered one of the most important Croatian writers today, influencing generations of Croatian authors with his lyrics, poems, distinctive style and uncompromising attitude. He is the twin brother of writer Ivan Dragojević.

Poet Ante Stamać used more traditional, classical forms than most of the Reason writers, and is associated with existential poetry. Igor Zidić writes his poetry in compact, elliptical, clean statements, while Dubravko Horvatić developed a form of poetry in prose. Novelist and essayist Milan Mirić was also part of the Razlog generation.

Although very productive in poetry and criticism, the Reason group left no major prose works. Nedjeljko Fabrio is one of the few writers (also playwright, essayist and translator), whose writing displays a certain kinship with the group. In the 1980s, he had great success with two thematically related historical novels: Vježbanje života (Practice of Life, 1985) and "Berenikina Kosa” (Berenice's Hair, 1989). Mate Raos was an early writer of fantasy fiction that would become popular in later years. Tomislav Slavica wrote modernist-style prose organized with a strong allegorical and symbolic component. Jozo Laušić dealt with subjects related to Dalmatian Hinterland in his series of novels.

==== Drama and verse ====
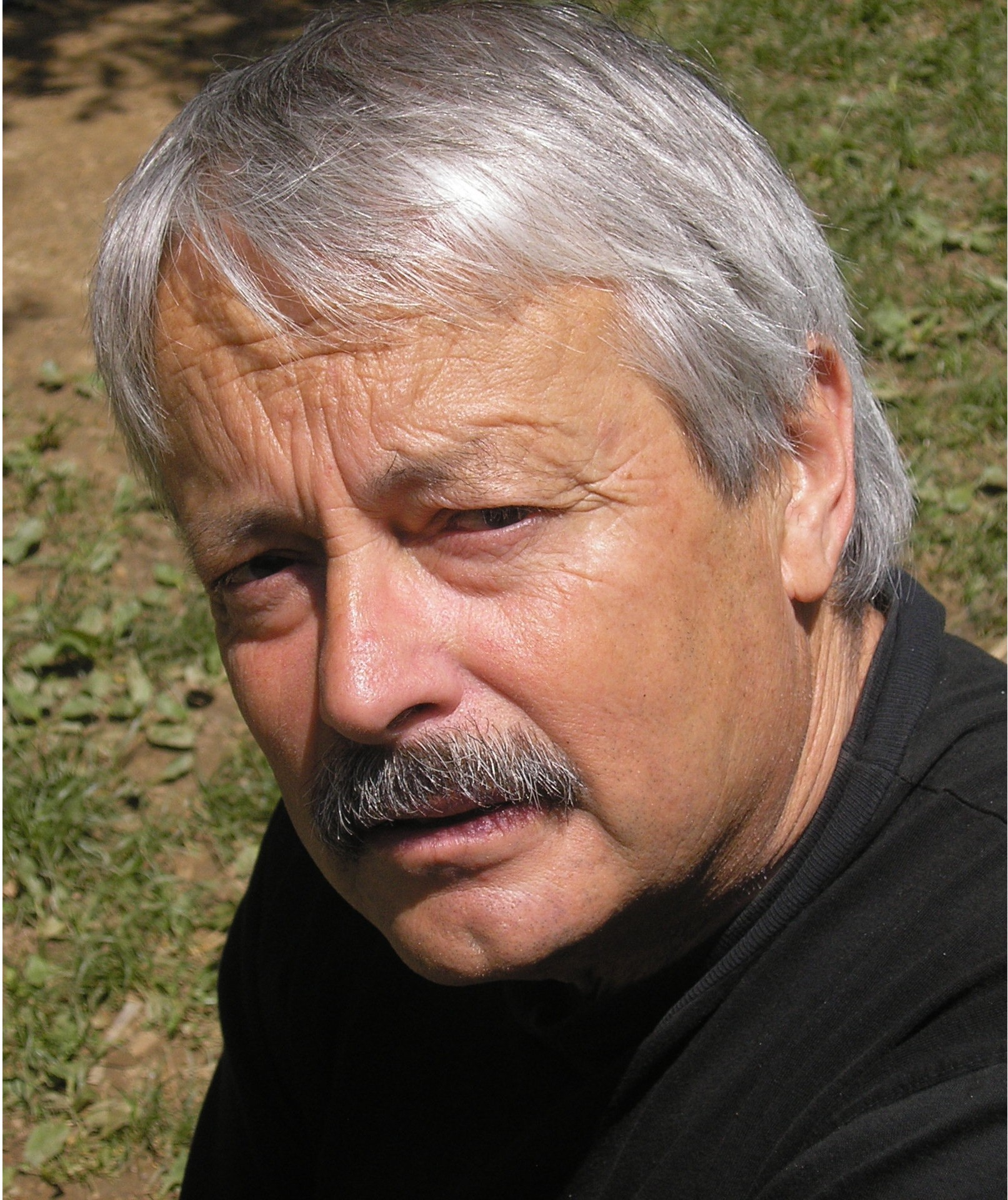
Slobodan Šnajder

At the end of the 1960s and early 1970s, a number of remarkable dramatists appeared in Croatian literature. Ivo Brešan is the author of a large number of plays marked by language interplay and the grotesque; his drama Predstava Hamleta u selu Mrduša Donja (Hamlet performance in the village of Mrduša Donja, first performed in 1971) is the most influential Croatian drama in the second half of the 20th century. He is also a successful novelist and screenwriter.

Slobodan Šnajder relies on the poetics of the avant-garde theatre of the 1960s and Krleža's heritage. Other dramatic writers were Tomislav Bakarić, Ivan Bakmaz and Slobodan Šembera. Dubravko Jelačić Bužimski writes drama, novels and prose for children. Boris Senker, Nino Škrabe and Tahir Mujičić wrote several comedies.

Branimir Bošnjak uses post-structuralist settings in his essays while his poetry evokes existential concepts. The poetry of Goran Babić characterized by an interest in the dark side of human existence. His themes range in tone and imagination from ancient legends to extravagant confessionals.

Marija Peakić Mikuljan's poetry is taken up with themes of falling, disappearing, and dying, along with a preoccupation with the musicality of the verse. Stijepo Mijović Kočan writes poetry of heterogeneous expression, ranging from modernist experiments to patterns of poetry. Jasna Melvinger writes intimate poetry with elegance and introspection. Luko Paljetak is a leading poet in various forms. His work is distinguished by its thoughtfulness, musicality of verse, and the effective conflict of feeling and irony. Borben Vladović is one of the best representatives of visual poetry in Croatia.

Among the many poets who published their first books at the end of the 1960s, and early 1970s, were Ernest Fišer, Željko Knežević, Mario Suško, Gojko Sušac, Jordan Jelić, Dubravka Oraić Tolić, Ivan Rogić Nehajev, Andriana Škunca, Vladimir Reinhofer, Nikola Martić, Ivan Kordić, Jakša Fiamengo, Momčilo Popadić, Enes Kišević, Tomislav Marijan Bilosnić, Džemaludin Alić, Stjepan Šešelj, Sonja Manojlović, Mile Pešorda, Tomislav Matijević, Božica Jelušić, Željko Ivanković, Dražen Katunarić, and Mile Stojić.

==== Modern Croatian prose ====
The new generation of authors in the early 1970s had a fondness for fantasy and was inspired by contemporary Latin American fiction, Russian symbolism and avant-garde (especially Bulgakov), then Kafka, Schulz, Calvino, and Singer. There was renewed interest in writing fiction, especially modern Croatian prose. Structural form became important; literary creation was often the theme, and quotations from Croatia's literary heritage often appeared. Towards the end of the 1970s, many writers were integrating so-called trivial genres (detective stories, melodrama) into high literature, while others were writing socially critical prose, for example, romance thrust into novels, which was popular in the 1970s.

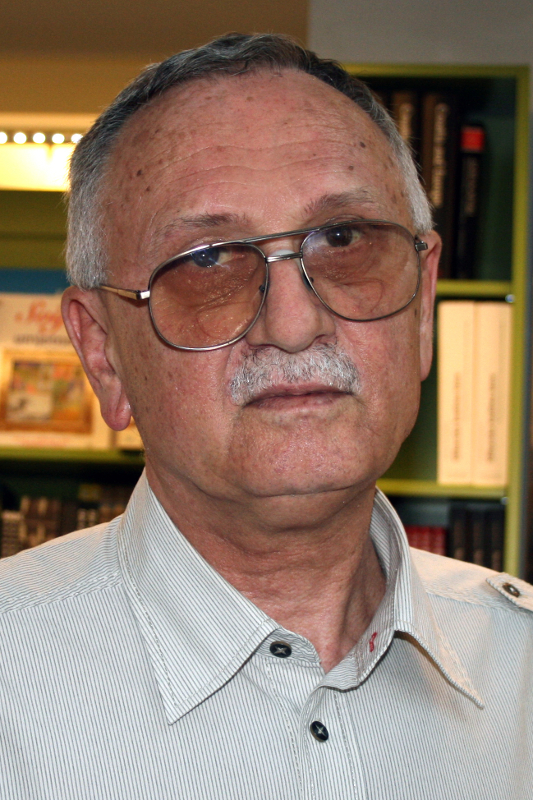
Pavao Pavličić wrote a number of detective novels and other works

Nenad Šepić and Albert Goldstein with their fantasy novels, led the generation of writers born after the Second World War. Stjepan Čuić in his early work Staljinova slika i druge priče (Stalin's Picture and Other Stories, 1971), intertwined fantasy and allegorical narrative dealing with the individual's relationship with a totalitarian political system.

Pavao Pavličić is a prolific writer, screenwriter, literary historian and theorist. He started as a fantasist willing to experiment, then went on to write a series of novels, mainly detective fiction. Goran Tribuson initially wrote an erudite type of fantasy prose, followed by a series of novels and short stories in which he nostalgically evokes the mythology of the sixty-four generation. He also writes detective fiction and screenplays.

The writing of Dubravka Ugrešić makes extensive use of quotations from classics as well as from popular literature. In the 1990s, her novels and books of political essays received several prestigious awards. Veljko Barbieri writes fiction related to the Mediterranean atmosphere, using quotations from classical Greek and Roman literature. Pero Kvesić writes so-called "jeans" prose with themes from the life of city youth, shaped into an urban colloquial style. Slavenka Drakulić writes novels and essays sparked by a feminist spirit and which have been published worldwide.

In the mid-1980s, in the journal Quorum, a series of new prose writers, poets and critics appeared: Damir Miloš, Ljiljana Domić, Branko Čegec, Krešimir Bagić, Vlaho Bogišić, Hrvoje Pejaković, Edo Budiša, Julijana Matanović, Goran Rem, Delimir Rešicki, Miroslav Mićanović, Miloš Đurđević, Nikola Petković and several young dramatic writers, such as Borislav Vujčić, Miro Gavran, Lada Kaštelan, Ivan Vidić, and Asja Srnec-Todorović.

==== Croatian War of Independence ====
Croatian War of Independence of 1991–95 had its echoes in literary works. Many writers were employed in support of Croatian independence and territorial integrity. Popular genres were patriotic columns and newspaper reports of the war. An anthology of patriotic poetry was published U ovom strašnom času (In this Terrible Time", 1992, edited by Ivo Sanader and Ante Stamać), and a representative collection of the wartime literary output was issued under Hrvatsko ratno pismo (Croatian war letters", 1992, edited by Dubravka Oraić Tolić).

During that period, many Croatian emigrant writers returned to Croatia. Nikolić transferred the location of his Hrvatske revije (Croatian Review) to the country. Of the returning authors, Boris Maruna was best integrated into the mainstream of contemporary Croatian literature. In contrast, other writers such as Dubravka Ugrešić, Slavenka Drakulić, Predrag Matvejević, Slobodan Šnajder, and Rada Iveković continued their literary activity abroad.

The war in Bosnia and Herzegovina also brought several Croatian writers from Sarajevo to Zagreb, among which were Miljenko Jergović, author of one of the best novels about the war in the former Yugoslavia Sarajevski Marlboro (Sarajevo Marlboro, 1994), Ivan Lovrenović Liber memorabilium, 1994), Jozefina Dautbegović, and Darko Lukić. Some prominent Serbian writers moved to Croatia and began writing in Croatian, for example Mirko Kovač and Bora Ćosić.

==== Festival of Alternative Literature ====
In 1990, a group of writers launched the Festival alternativne književnosti (FAK, Festival of Alternative Literature), an event for the public reading of literary works. Although initially emphasizing their mutual differences, most were characterized by a tendency towards neorealist poetry using a contemporary urban vocabulary. They were concerned about the lives of young people in a traumatized post-war Croatia and were critical of nationalistic myths. Among them were Zoran Ferić, Miljenko Jergović, Ante Tomić, Jurica Pavičić, and Robert Perišić.

==== Literature studies ====
The study of literature in Croatia in the mid-1950s put aside the previous social-realist ideology and developed into a more objective analytical form. In 1957, the journal Umjetnost riječi (Art of Words) was launched, collecting together a group of theoreticians and literary historians who would form the core of the Zagrebačke stilističke škole (Zagreb stylistic school). That was followed by the magazine Književna smotra (Literary Festival, 1969) and Croatica (1970).

During the second half of the 20th century, scholars in the field of Croatian literary studies included: Maja Bošković-Stulli, Viktor Žmegač, Darko Suvin, Milivoj Solar, Radoslav Katičić, Pavao Pavličić, Andrea Zlatar.

== See also ==
- Croatian comics
- Croatian Latin literature
- List of Croatian women writers
- List of Glagolitic books
- List of Glagolitic manuscripts

== Sources ==
- Croatian Glagolitic Manuscripts held outside Croatia
- Slavic Literature Resources from the Slavic Reference Service, University of Illinois, Urbana-Champaign

== Literature ==
- Cvitanic, Marilyn (2011). Culture and Customs of Croatia. Santa Barbara, California: ABC-CLIO. ISBN 9780313351174.
