= Viktor Vida =

Croatian writer

Viktor Vida (October 2, 1913 – September 25, 1960) was a Croatian writer.

== Early life ==
Vida was born in Kotor. After completing his matura in Podgorica in 1932, he moved with his parents to Zagreb, where he graduated from the University of Zagreb in both Croatian literature and Italian language and literature. From 1939, he worked as a librarian in the Institute of Italian Culture (Italian: Istituto di Cultura Italiana) in Zagreb. In 1941 he taught at the I Gymnasium.

His first poetry was published in Slobodna misao weekly in Nikšić.

== Emigration ==
From 1943 he worked in Rome. He emigrated to Buenos Aires with his family in 1948. In Argentina he contributed to the Croatian emigrant publication Hrvatska revija.

His poetry is in the bohemian tradition of Antun Gustav Matoš and Tin Ujević, which he was inspired by after meeting the circle of writers around Ljubo Wiesner and Nikica Polić.

He committed suicide in Buenos Aires on September 25, 1960. His tombstone in the La Chacarita cemetery bears the inscription "Ars longa, vita brevis".

== Legacy ==
With Croatian independence in 1991, there was renewed availability and interest in his work. The Association of Croatian Writers held an academic conference on him in 1993.

== Works ==
Poetry collections:

- Svemir osobe (Buenos Aires, 1951)
- Sužanj vremena (Buenos Aires, 1956)
- Sabrane pjesme (Buenos Aires, 1962)
- Otrovane lokve (Zagreb, 1971)
- Izabrane pjesme (Zagreb, 1994)

Non-fiction:

- Otključana škrinjica (Zagreb, 1997)

== Bibliography ==
- Brešić, Vinko (1998). "Hrvatska emigrantska književnost (1945.-1990.)" [Croatian Emigrant Literature (1945-1990)] (PDF). Croatica (in Croatian). 27 (45–46): 247–271.
- Šego, Jasna (2015). "Egzistencijalni, duhovni i eshatološki obzori Viktora Vide" [Existential, Spiritual and Eschatological Horizons of Viktor Vida] (PDF). Kroatologija (in Croatian). 6 (1–2): 260–276.
