= Petar Kanavelić =

- Born: December 27, 1637; Korčula, Republic of Venice (now Croatia)
- Died: January 16, 1719 (aged 81); Korčula, Republic of Venice (now Croatia)
- Other name: Pietro Canavelli
- Occupations: Writer, poet

Pietro Canavelli (in Italian, his personal spelling; known as Petar Kanavelić in Croatian; 27 December 1637 – 16 January 1719) was a Croatian writer who wrote poems in Croatian and Italian. He is regarded as one of the greatest Croatian writers of the 17th century.

== Biography ==
Canavelli was born in Curzola (Korčula), part of the Republic of Venice (now modern Croatia), the last male descendant of an old, wealthy and distinguished noble family of the town. In Curzola he attended local schools. He undertook clerical studies. He also studied law in Padua. This was a quite common practice for the time for patricians from all over the Republic of Venice. He worked in a series of town offices, mostly in legal matters, trade and the management of property. He was also a teacher, lawyer and in 1665 became a member of the Great Council. In Zara (Zadar), he was Chancellor of the Venetian Governor General of Dalmatia, C. Cornaro and A. Priuli (1665–68). In 1673 he became the representative of the Curzola community in Venice. He died in Curzola in 1719.

== Literary activity ==
Canavelli's literary work is one of the widest and most diverse in the 17th century. He wrote poems, epic works and songs in Croatian and Italian. He occasionally composed wedding songs. The oldest preserved traces of Canavelli's literary work was a written confirmation from 1660 for which he was paid 12 Lira for performing the song on the occasion of the arrival of General A. Cornaro, in the town of Curzola. This is one of the oldest recorded fee payments in the history of Croatian literature. During his stay in Zadar, Canavelli was in Spalato (Split) in 1667 and participated in the Italian comedy La moglie di Quattro Care which was by Venetian librettist Giacinto Andrea Cicognini. He traveled throughout Dalmatia and the Republic of Ragusa. There he gained a status within the Ragusan community who were mostly the leading writers and intellectuals of their time (Nikola Bunic, Baro Bettera, Sisko Gundulic, George Lucic). Later he became a member of the Akademije Ispraznijeh. His works have been translated in Italian, Hungarian and Polish.

There is a primary school named after him in the town of Korčula.

== See also ==
- Croatian literature
- Dalmatia
