= Rajmund Kupareo =

Croatian Roman Catholic priest (1914–1996)

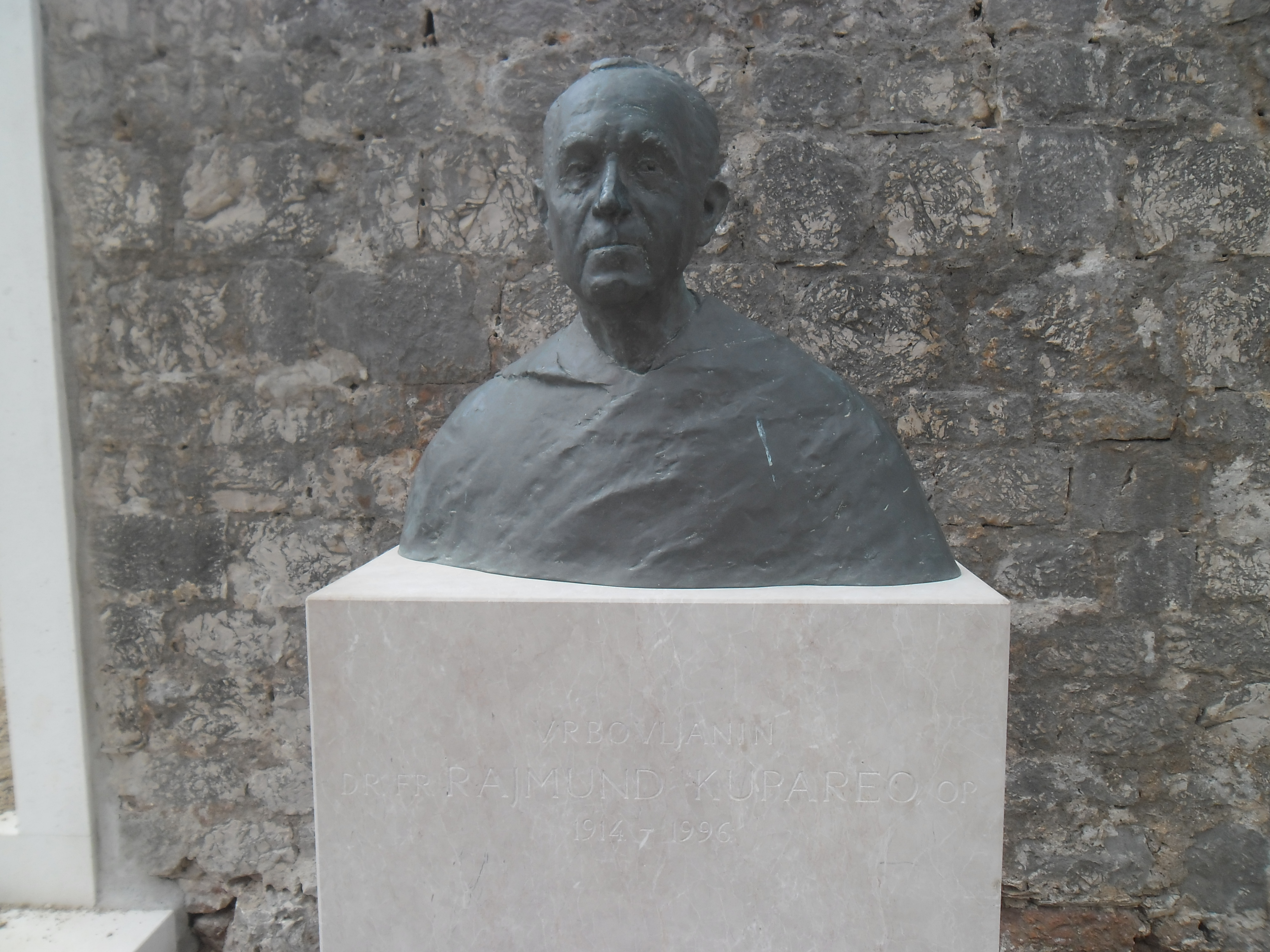
- Born: 16 November 1914; Vrboska, Croatia
- Died: 6 June 1996 (aged 81); Zagreb, Croatia

Rajmund Kupareo (Spanish: Raimundo Kupareo) (16 November 1914 – 6 June 1996) was a Croatian Roman Catholic priest of the Dominican Order, poet, theological writer, composer, translator and editor. He wrote in Croatian, Czech, Latin and Spanish. He spent years working as a professor of aesthetics and axiology in Santiago de Chile, Chile; he served there as the dean of the Faculty of Philosophy (twice) and the vice-rector of the Pontifical Catholic University of Chile.

In his philosophical work, Kupareo deals with the deep meaning and purpose of the art.

== Life ==
Rajmund Kupareo was born on 16 November 1914 in Vrboska, the island of Hvar (present-day Republic of Croatia), a descendant of an old noble family. He entered the Order of the Preachers in Dubrovnik in 1930 and was ordained priest in Split in 1937. He studied philosophy, theology and languages in Dubrovnik, Zagreb (Croatia), Olomouc (Moravia), Santiago de Chile (Chile) and Washington, D.C. (USA).

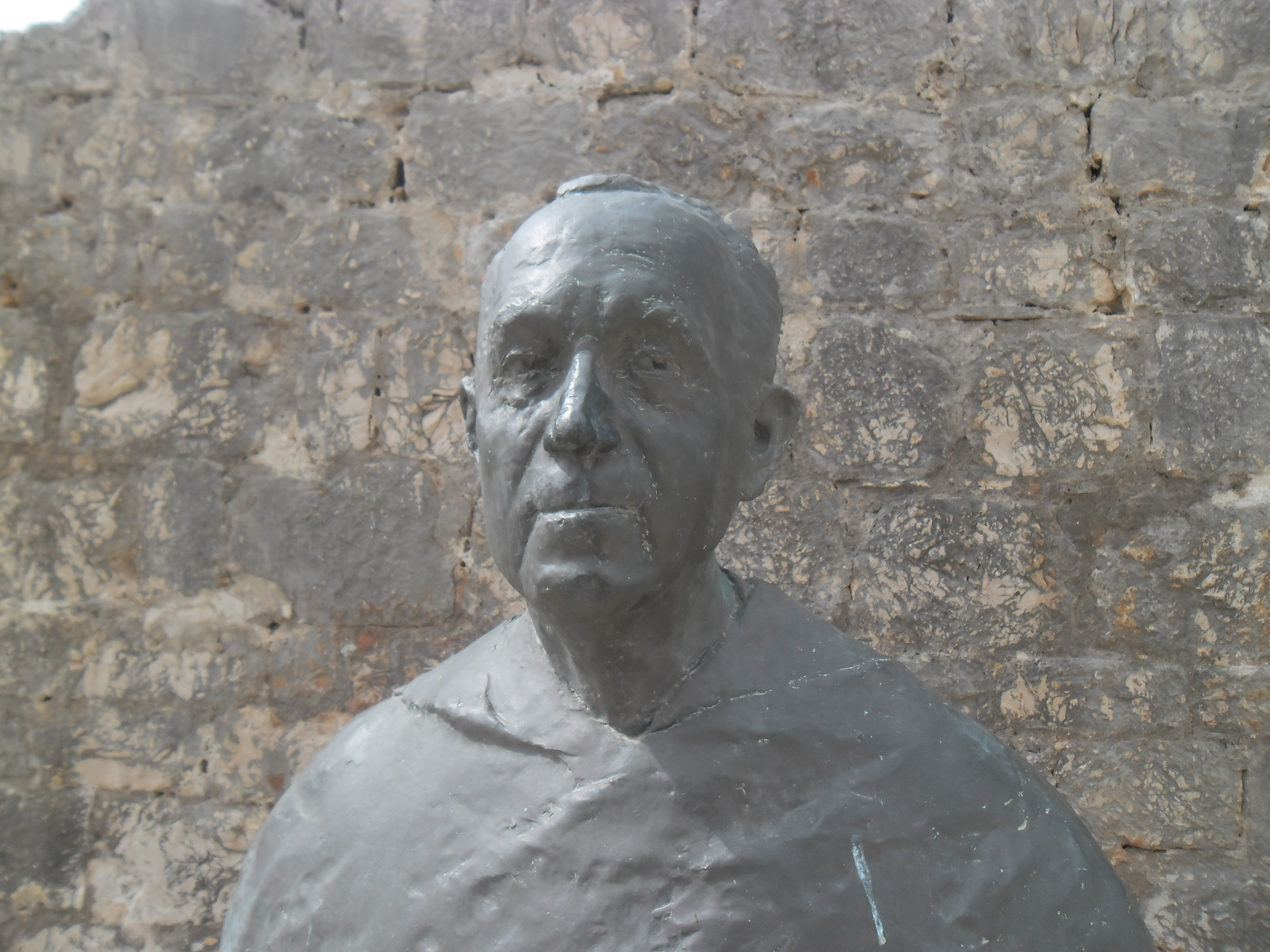
Monument in Vrboska

During World War II, Kupareo was the editor-in-chief of Gospina krunica (Our Lady's Rosary), a Catholic monthly magazine in Zagreb. He also managed the Dominican publishing house Istina (Truth), which published a translation of The Story of a Soul by Saint Thérèse of Lisieux, and Razmišljanja o krunici (Meditations on the Rosary), translated by Aloysius Stepinac, the Archbishop of Zagreb. The arrival of communist troops in the spring of 1945 hindered his project to publish all the sermons and speeches delivered by Stepinac from 1934–44, in which the Archbishop had strongly condemned racism and intolerance, and emphasized the right of the Croatian people to have their own state. After entering Zagreb, the communists destroyed the entire edition of 10.000 books in the printing-house. Only one copy was saved and Stepinac later used it at his trial to show there was no freedom of press in Tito's Yugoslavia. He left Croatia on 2 January 1947, and did not return until 10 June 1971. He took refuge first in the Czech Republic, afterwards in the Netherlands, France and Spain. Finally, in 1950, he found his place in Chile. He spent his most productive years as a professor of aesthetics and axiology in Santiago de Chile and served as the dean of the Faculty of Philosophy (twice) and the vice-rector of the Pontifical Catholic University of Chile. He was the founder the Institute of Aesthetics and the School of Journalism in Santiago de Chile, as well as initiator and editor of several publications. As the official representative of the university, he traveled through North, Central and South America, Europe and the Middle East.

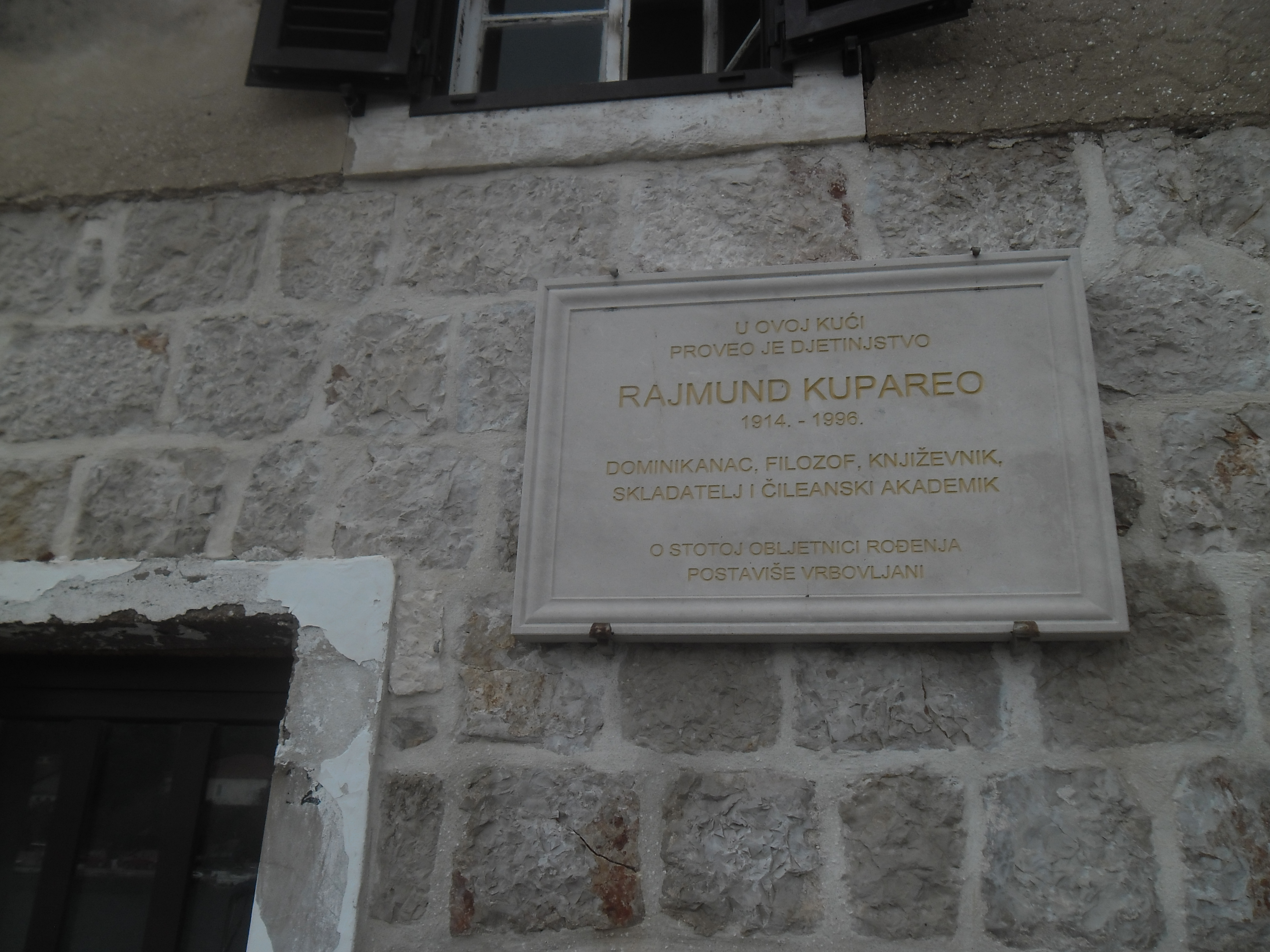
Memorial

He suffered a stroke on 14 May 1970, which forced him to retire. He returned to Croatia to die but recovered to a certain degree and led a secluded and simple life in the Dominican priory in Zagreb. Despite his frail condition, he continued his literary and scientific work. In 1985 he became a member of Academia Chilena de la Lengua of the Instituto de Chile, the Chilean Academy of Arts and Letters. After the democratic changes in Croatia he finally became a member of the Croatian Writers Association.

In 1985, he was promoted a foreign member of Academia Chilena de la Lengua.

He died in Zagreb, Croatia, on June 6th, 1996.

== Work ==
Kupareo published 25 different volumes of his writings: nine treatises on aesthetics (in Latin, Spanish and Croatian) and 14 books of poetry, novels, stories and plays (in Croatian, Czech and Spanish). His poetry is compiled in the anthology Svjetloznak (Lightsign, 1994). After his death two more poems were found in manuscript form and published in the daily newspaper Vjesnik on 6 June 1998.

He authored significant number of compositions of religious and secular character: manuscripts of polyphonic motets and even a few operettas, mainly to his own lyrics, are kept in Dominican priories’ archives in Croatia, Chile and Italy. Among others, he put to music O Spem Miram (O wonderful hope), the famous prayer to St Dominic, while he was in Las Caldas de Besayu priory (Spain) in 1949.

His stories on World War II and the lives of Dominicans, priests, professors and emigrants in Latin and North America: Balada iz Magallanesa (The Ballad from Magallanes) are published in 1978; followed by stories on the same subject Čežnja za zavičajem (Longing for Home, 1989) and Patka priča (Tales by a Duck, 1994). In 1939. is published his novel: U morskoj kući (In the Sea House, 1939), followed with novels Jedinac (The Only Son, 1942), Baraban (Barabban, 1943) and Sunovrati (The Narcissi, 1960).

He wrote two children's plays: Magnificat and Sliepo srdce (The Blind Heart, 1944) and three plays: Muka Kristova (Christ's Passion, Madrid, 1948), Uskrsnuće (The Resurrection, 1983) and Porođenje (The Nativity, 1984). These last three were published together under the title Prebivao je među nama (He Resided Among Us, 1985).

Starting with his Chilean period, he wrote several book on aesthetics: Ars et moralis (1951), El Valor del Arte – Axiología estética (1964), Creationes Humanas, I, La Poesia (1965), Creationes Humanas, II, El Drama (1966), Umjetnik i zagonetka života (The Artist and the Mystery of Life, 1982), Govor umjetnosti (Language of the Art, 1987), Čovjek i umjetnost (Man and the Art, 1993) and Um i umjetnost (Intellect and Art, 2007).

== See also ==
- Croatian literature
- Dominicans
