= Josip Eugen Tomić =

Croatian writer (1843–1906)

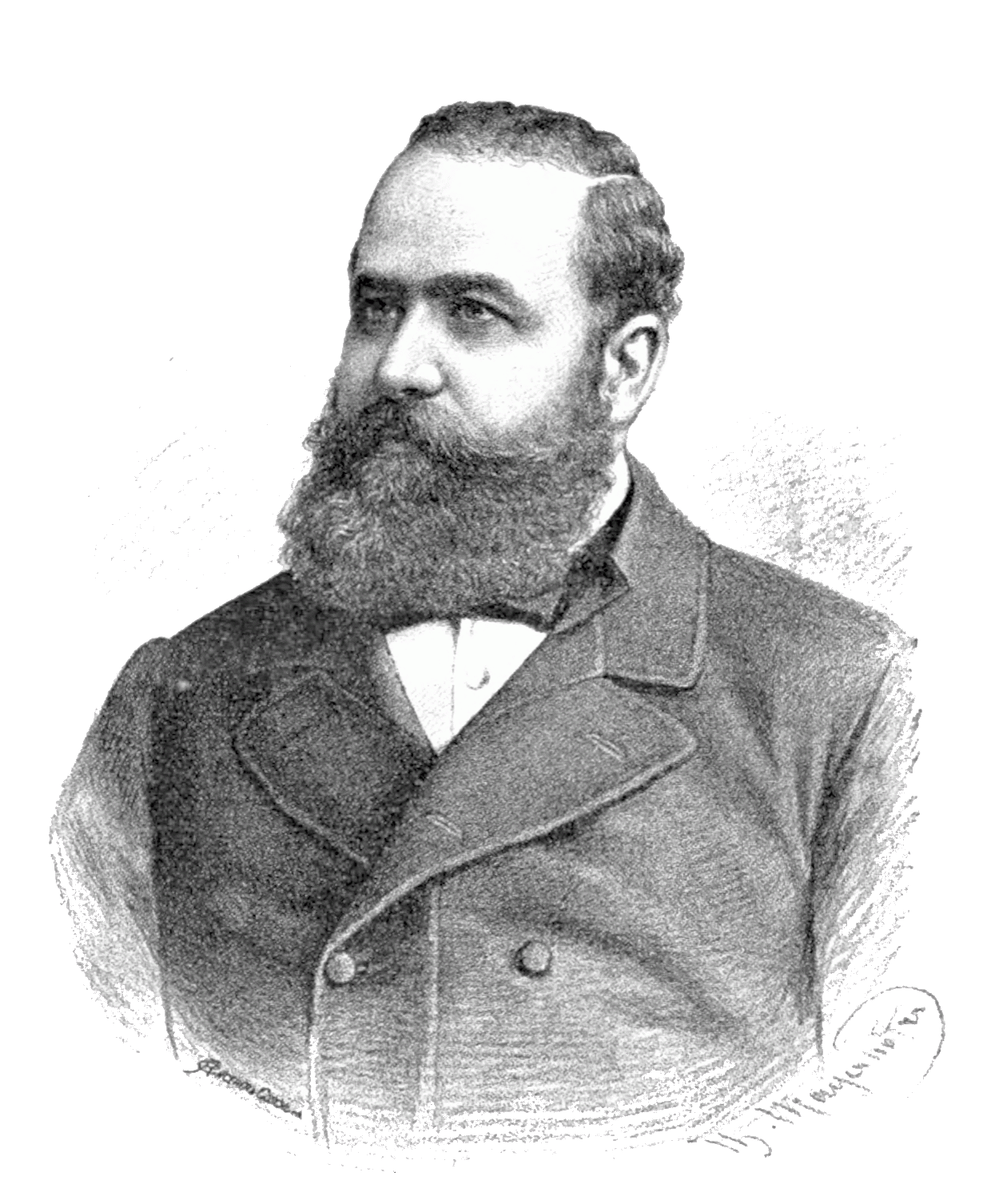
- Tomić in 1884 for Vienac
- Born: October 18, 1843; Požega, Kingdom of Croatia, Austrian Empire (now Požega, Croatia)
- Died: July 13, 1906 (aged 62); Zagreb, Kingdom of Croatia-Slavonia, Austria-Hungary (now Zagreb, Croatia)
- Occupations: novelist, translator

Josip Eugen Tomić (Croatian pronunciation: [jǒsip ěugen tômit͡ɕ]; October 18, 1843 – July 13, 1906) was a Croatian writer and translator.

Tomić was born in Požega. He specialised in writing light-hearted fiction, with which he became very popular. Many of his works dealt with neighbouring Bosnia and Herzegovina. He is known for translating 50 plays to Croatian. He is also known for completing August Šenoa's historical novel Kletva (The Curse) and for writing his own historical novels. He died in Zagreb.
