= Dinko Šimunović =

Croatian writer

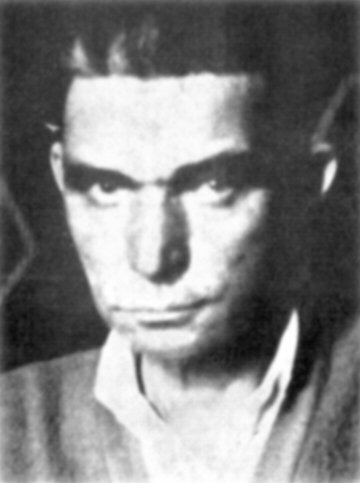
- Born: 1 September 1873; Knin, Dalmatia, Austria-Hungary (now Knin, Croatia)
- Died: 3 August 1933 (aged 59); Zagreb, Yugoslavia (now Zagreb, Croatia)
- Occupations: Teacher, Writer
- Writing career
- Language: Croatian
- Genres: Realism, impressionism

Dinko Šimunović (1 September 1873 – 3 August 1933) was a Croatian writer.

Dinko Šimunović was born in Knin. He spent almost two decades as a teacher in villages of the Zagora, the hinterland of Dalmatia. He retired in 1927 and moved to Zagreb in 1929, where he died in 1933.

Šimunović wrote many stories and two novels, all dealing with people from his native region. His contemporaries described his works as championing a patriarchal, hierarchical, black-and-white world, an impression further reinforced by author's personal distaste towards the modern, urban way of living.

== Biography ==
Dinko Šimunović spent his early childhood in Koljane near Vrlika where his father was a teacher in Kijevo. Šimunović completed teacher's school in Arbanasi between 1888 and 1892.

== Works ==
- "Duga" (The Rainbow, 1907)
- "Alkar" (The Knight, 1908)
- "Mrkodol" (1909)
- "Tuđinac" (The Foreigner, 1911)
- "Đerdan" (1914)
- "Mladost" (The Youth, 1921)
- "Porodica Vinčić" (Vinčić Family, 1923)

Alkar was translated to Chinese language and published in Shanghai in 1936.

== Bibliography ==
- Durić, Dejan (March 2013). "Patrijarhat, rod i pripovijetke Dinka Šimunovića" [Patriarchy, Gender And Stories By Dinko Šimunović] (PDF). Croatica et Slavica Iadertina (in Croatian). 8/1 (8): 259–276. doi:10.15291/csi.596.
