= Darko Lukić =

Croatian playwright (born 1962)

- Born: 8 September 1962 (age 64); Sarajevo, PR Bosnia and Herzegovina, FPR Yugoslavia
- Occupations: Theater scholar, writer, cultural theorist and playwright

Darko Lukić (born September 8, 1962) is a Croatian theatre scholar, writer, cultural theorist and playwright living and working in Germany. As an expert in multi-disciplinary expert pool for capacity building for European Capitals of Culture worked at audience development program ADESTE+. and Rijeka, European capital of Culture 2020. Lukić also publishes scientific papers and participates in international conferences and seminars and translates from English and Spanish language. He is the member of Programme Board of Maribor 2012, European Capital of Culture 2012. He was a member of the European jury of theatrologists for “Premio Europa per il teatro” award (2009), member of the jury for “Marko Fotez” theatre award of HAZU (Croatian Academy of Science and Arts (2008), president of the Board of Gavella Theatre (2007-2011), editor in Hrvatsko glumište (Croatian Theatre) magazine HDDU (2007-2009), artistic advisor of HAVC, Hrvatski audiovizualni centar (Croatian Audiovisual Centre) (2008-2011), artistic advisor of Ministry of Culture - Ministarstvo kulture RH and HRT (Croatian Radio – Television) for film (2006-2008), member of the Cultural Council for Performing Arts of Croatian Ministry of Culture (2001- 2004), president of the Theatre Committee of the City of Zagreb (2002-2004), member of the Council for International Cultural Cooperation of the City of Zagreb (2005-2007), and President of the Cultural Council for International Cooperation Ministry of Culture - Ministarstvo kulture RH (2013-2016), and member of Croatian centre of PEN International, member of IETM, CAE, ENCATC, Memory Studies Association, IFTR and EASTAP.

His areas of research, beside Audience development, are remembrance and trauma in theater and applied theater.

== Biography ==
Lukić was born in Sarajevo, FPR Yugoslavia (modern-day Bosnia and Herzegovina) where he finished elementary and high school, and completed studies of Comparative literature and Philosophy at the Filozofski fakultet u Sarajevu (Faculty of Philosophy). He published his first short story in 1980, as a high school senior. As a student, he started writing theatre critics, first in youth and student magazines and newspapers, and then in professional magazines and daily newspapers, and on radio and television. He continually published drama, ballet, opera and literary critics and reviews, and started working as a dramaturg in theatre and on television. After graduation, he enrolled on postgraduate studies at Fakultet dramskih umjetnosti u Beogradu (Dramatic Arts Faculty in Belgrade), where he got his master's degree in Drama and Theatre (1990). He continued publishing in different media, as well as working as a dramaturg in drama and dance performances and festivals all over former Yugoslavia (today's Republics of Serbia, Montenegro, North Macedonia, Slovenia, Croatia, Bosnia and Herzegovina). In 1990 he became Artistic Director of Drama of National Theatre in Sarajevo as the youngest director of capital's National drama theatre in former Yugoslavia. He left Sarajevo during the war and went to Slovenia, and to Zagreb (Croatia) where he worked as a dramaturg (1995-1998), and then Artistic Director of Teatar &TD (1998-2002). In the same period, he was also Artistic Director of INK:MKFM (International Youth Theatre Festival in Pula) (1996-2001) and selector of Međunarodni festival malih scena Rijeka (International Small Scenes Festival) in Rijeka (2002-2003). At the same time, he continued work on his education, and specialized as a Fulbright scholar at Tisch School of the Arts, New York University in New York 1997, then at the European Academy for Culture and Management in Salzburg 1995 (where he got the Diploma in cultural management), at ISTA Odin Teatret, Institute for Theatre Anthropology, University of Copenhagen 1998, and as playwright at The Royal Court Theatre in London 1996. and LA CHARTREUSE, 1994. He got his PhD in humanities at Faculty of Humanities and Social Sciences, University of Zagreb in 2005. Since 2001, he has been a professor at the Academy of Dramatic Arts in Zagreb, in departments of theater management and production, dramaturgy and theatre theory. He is also teaching at Doctoral studies of literature, Performing arts studies, Film and Cultural studies at Faculty of Humanities and Social Sciences, University of Zagreb. As a guest professor worked at the Karl-Franzens-Universität Graz (Austria), Akademija dramskih umjetnosti u Tuzli (Academy of Drama Arts in Tuzla) and Akademija scenskih umjetnosti Sarajevo (Academy of Performing Arts in Sarajevo). He also gives lectures and runs workshops outside Croatia, at United Kingdom, United States, Italy, Brazil, Argentina, Bulgaria, Romania, Venezuela and Costa Rica.

== Works ==
Performance Studies

Summarizing the experiences of practical dramaturgy work in drama and dance theatre, experiences of a critic who extensively travelled and followed recent production in regions and festivals, and through experience of scientific and expert research and studies, 1990. Lukić published a book of theatre essays and studies “Misliti igru?” (Thinking the Game?) in which he establishes basic direction of his future interests in theory of Performance studies, positioned between theatre anthropology and Cultural studies. Basic interest for exploring different forms of dynamic interaction between performance and all kinds of environment in which it occurs, as well as transdisciplinarity and interculturality shown in this book are being later developed in large number of Lukić's essays, studies and texts published in magazines and papers in numerous seminars, symposiums and conferences all over the world. In the book “Drama ratne traume” (Drama of war trauma), published in 2009, he comparatively analyses transposition of war trauma and dramatic speech of trauma in the examples of American plays on Vietnam War themes, and Croatian plays concerning contemporary war and disintegration of former Yugoslavia. In this book he researches social, psychosocial and political influences on plays. His book “Produkcija i marketing scenskih umjetnosti” (Production and marketing of performing arts) has had two editions (2006 and 2010) and is part of academic curriculum at several university studies of production and theater management in Southeast Europe. Two volume book "Kazalište u svom okruženju" (Theatre in Environment) with the first volume "Kazališni identiteti" (Theatre Identities) (2010) and the second volume "Kazališna intermedijalnost i interkulturalnost" (Theatrical Intermediality and Interculturalism) (2011) are a unique summary of psychological, sociological, anthropological, economical, political, cultural and media research of theatre and different forms of performing arts. Critics agree there is no similar research in contemporary Croatian theatrological literature, either by its themes volume and scope, or by its complex interdisciplinarity. His book "Uvod u antropologiju izvedbe" (Introduction to Anthropology of Performance) (2013) present all the recent approaches to the performance in contemporary anthropology, psychology, cultural studies, theology, neuroscience and sociology, in attempt to explain performance through the human biological and social evolution.

Cultural Politics

Working many years in Cultural policy, as a participant and co - creator of cultural politics through active participation in cultural institutions and at the same time by theoretical and scientific research of the relation between culture and society, Lukić has published papers in numerous symposia and conferences, and published commentaries and analysis on current problems of cultural policies in countries in transition in specialist magazines. In his book “Kazalište, kultura, tranzicija” (Theatre, Culture, Transition) published 2011, basic topics are relationship between culture, government and non-governmental institutions, financing, budgeting and governmental subsidizing of cultural programs, strategic planning of cultural policies and problems of the cultural transition, as viewed from the angle of performing arts.

Cultural Studies

After 2010, focus of Lukić's research moves towards the relationship between performing arts and representation of minority identities, accessibility of performance arts to individuals with disabilities, and visibility and recognition of minorities, repressed and marginalized social groups in performance and through performing arts practices.

== Fiction ==
Lukić published the first book of short stories “Gonetanje zrcala” (Surmising the Mirror) in 1987. Short stories in that book are mostly retelling and reinterpreting some of the mythological and cultural motives and are exploring topic of art and illusion in human life. He published his first novel “Noći punog mjeseca” (Nights of the Full Moon) in 1990. The novel was shortlisted among ten finalists the same year, for the most prestigious Yugoslav literary award NIN-ova nagrada za roman godine (Magazine NIN's award for the novel of the year”. In extremely postmodernist and metatextual construction, the novel makes up new commentaries of great historical events and connects themes that are very far apart, spatially and time wise. Lukić published his second novel “Uzaludnosti” (Futilities) in 1996. That novel, in the research of literary portal Op Art was recognized as the second most read novel in Croatia in the period 1996 – 2006, based on the data of sales and library usage. The story of two couples, younger and older, who meet by accident in Europe at the end of the 20th century was evaluated by critics as “deeply emotional and at the same time intellectually sophisticated”. The third novel “Bijeg od budućnosti” (The Escape from Future) was published in 2008, twelve years after the previous novel. In that novel, set in the contemporary surroundings, eight people try, in different ways, to resolve their life problems by using a psychic (fortune-teller), while at the same time a threat of terrorist attack is looming over. The critics called the novel a “refined chronicle of contemporary Croatian society”.

== Plays and theatre adaptations ==
Since 1990, a great number of Lukić's plays, ballet librettos and drama adaptations have been set on stages in Bosnia and Herzegovina, Croatia, Serbia, Slovenia, Spain, United States, Romania, Venezuela, Germany, and Poland. Apart from his own plays, Lukić wrote a considerable number of ballet librettos and made stage adaptations and dramatizations of great literary works, such as War and Peace by Tolstoy, Madame Bovary by Flaubert, City and dogs by Mario Vargas Llosa, Orlando by Virginia Woolf, Fortress by Meša Selimović and Eliah's chair by Igor Štiks. He translated plays for theatre from English and Spanish to Croatian, such as Caryl Churchill, Tom Kempinski, Manuel Puig, Sergi Belbel and others.

== Selected bibliography ==
Fiction:

Surmising the Mirror, Svjetlost, Sarajevo, 1987.

Nights of the Full Moon, Svjetlost, Sarajevo, 1990.

Futilities, HIT, Znanje, Zagreb, 1996.

The Escape from Future, Profil, Zagreb, 2008.

Non-fiction books

Thinking the Game?, Teatrorama, Sarajevo, 1990.

Pandur's Book of Dreams, (with Livija Pandur and Dalibor Foretić) Seventheaven, Maribor, 1997.

Production and Marketing of Performing Arts, Hrvatski Centar ITI UNESCO, Zagreb, 2006.

The War Trauma Drama, Meandar, Zagreb, 2009.

Production and Marketing of Performing Arts, second edition, Hrvatski Centar ITI, Zagreb, 2010.

Theatre in Environment, vol 1. Theatre Identities, Leykam International, Zagreb, 2010.

Theatre, Culture, Transition, Hrvatski Centar ITI, Zagreb, 2011.

Theatre in its Environment, vol 2. Theatrical Intermediality and Interculturalism, Leykam International, Zagreb, 2011.

Introduction to Anthropology of Performance, Leykam International, Zagreb, 2013.

Introduction to Applied Theatre, Leykam International, Zagreb, 2016.

Articles:

Teatro y Comprimiso, Primer Acto, Madrid, 10. 1995.

Contemporary Croatian War Plays, Slavic and East European Performance, New York, summer 1997.

New Theatre Audience, Frakcija, Zagreb, 03. 1997.

AIDS in American Theatre, Frakcija, Zagreb, 06.1997.

How Ancient Greek Drama Affected my Playwriting Concerning the Contemporary Balkan Wars, Fifth International Symposium on Ancient Greek Drama, Cyprus, 12. 1999,

The Existence of Gay plays, Frakcija, Zagreb, 06. 1999.

Dictionary of Dramaturgy (with Livija Pandur), Scena, Novi Sad, 9/10 2002.

Study Scripts of Theater Production 1. and 2. Kult Film, Zagreb, 2003. and 2004.

Overview of the Fragments of East and the West, Hrvatsko glumiste, summer 2004.

Croatian Theatre 2001-2003: Transformations, The World of Theatre, ITI UNESCO, Paris,10. 2004.

Problems of Translating Contemporary Plays Outside of Their Native Cultural Environment, Works from Symposium «Drama Texts Today in Bosnia and Herzegovina, Croatia, and Serbia and Montenegro: Possibilities of Dramaturgist readings», Universite Paris IV Sorbonne/University of Montenegro, Paris/Podgorica, 10. 2004.

Croatian Theatre Faced with the Challenges of European Integrations, Kazaliste, 19/20 2004.

Demystification of the Market – Theatre and its Consumers, Scena, Novi Sad, 09. 2005.

Croatian Drama of War Trauma, Kazaliste, Zagreb, 21/22 2005.

Show Business in Croatian Theater, Kazaliste, Zagreb, 23/24 2005.

'Male Stuff' from the Female Point of View; War and Warriors in Plays of Croatian Contemporary Female Playwrights, Works from Symposium «Drama Texts Today in Bosnia and Herzegovina, Croatia, and Serbia and Montenegro: Possibilities of Dramaturgist Readings» Universite Paris IV Sorbonne/Faculty of Philosophy University of Zagreb, Paris/Zagreb, 10. 2005.

Problem of Time in Drama, Works from Symposium «Drama Texts Today in Bosnia and Herzegovina, Croatia, and Serbia and Montenegro: Possibilities of Dramaturgist Readings» Universite Paris IV Sorbonne/Faculty of Philosophy University of Sarajevo, Paris/Sarajevo 12. 2006.

The Basic Problems of Theatre (Post)Transition, Scena, Novi sad, 4, 2008.

Transmedial Approach to the Theatre, Kazaliste, Zagreb, 35/36, 2008.

Theatre Producer – The organizer of the arts or the artist of organization?, Kazaliste, Zagreb, 33/34, 2008.

Preface: To Use or to Spend the Budget Money? in „Organizational Development and Strategic Planning in Culture: City of Zagreb“, Zagreb, 2008.

All the World's the Audiences, Kazaliste, Zagreb, 39/40, 2009

Our First Five Years, „HKD Theater/International Theater festival of Chamber Stages, Rijeka“, Rijeka 2009.

El mapeo del Pandur Theater, in Hamlet, Cuadernos del teatro Espanol, Madrid, 2009.

Time of a Certain Dramatic Challenge in “Drama and Time”, Sarajevo 2010.

Theatre and Economic Environment, Kazaliste, Zagreb, 2. 2010.

The Time Traveller, in Catalogue No. 1. Deutsches Staatsballett, Berlin, 2010.
