= Vjekoslav Kaleb =

Croatian writer

Vjekoslav Kaleb (27 September 1905 – 13 April 1996) was a Croatian short story writer and novelist.

== Biography ==
Kaleb was born in Tisno and educated in Zadar, Belgrade, Šibenik and Zagreb, where he attended Teacher’s Academy (today: Faculty of Teacher Education of the University of Zagreb). He later worked as a teacher in villages of the Zagora region in Croatia before joining the Partisans in 1943. After the World War II, Kaleb served as editor of many literary magazines (Književnik, Naprijed, Republika, Kolo) and secretary of the Croatian Writers’ Association and Matica hrvatska.

He has published 57 short stories and three novels, most of which deal with existential struggles of people in the remote hamlets of the rural Zagora during wartimes. The short story Gost (The Guest) is one of his first works (published in 1940), but also his best and most famous.

In addition to writing screenplays, articles and reviews, Kaleb was also a translator, his most notable work being the translation of Carlo Collodi’s Pinocchio. Kaleb’s works have also been translated into Albanian, English, French, German, Italian, Czech, Polish, Russian, Slovene and Macedonian.

== Selected works ==
Short stories

- Na kamenju (On the Stone), Zagreb 1940
- Izvan stvari (Outside of Things), Zagreb 1942
- Brigada (Brigade), Zagreb 1947
- Trideset konja (Thirty Horses), Zagreb 1947
- Kronika dana (Daily Chronicle), Zagreb 1949
- Smrtni zvuci (Sounds of Death), Sarajevo 1957
- Nagao vjetar (Hasty Wind), Zagreb 1959
- Ogledalo (Mirror), Beograd 1962

Novels

- Ponižene ulice (Humiliated Streets), Zagreb 1950
- Divota prašine (The Beauty of Dust), Zagreb 1954
- Bijeli kamen (White Stone), Zagreb, 1954
