= Ljubo Wiesner =

Croatian poet (1885–1951)

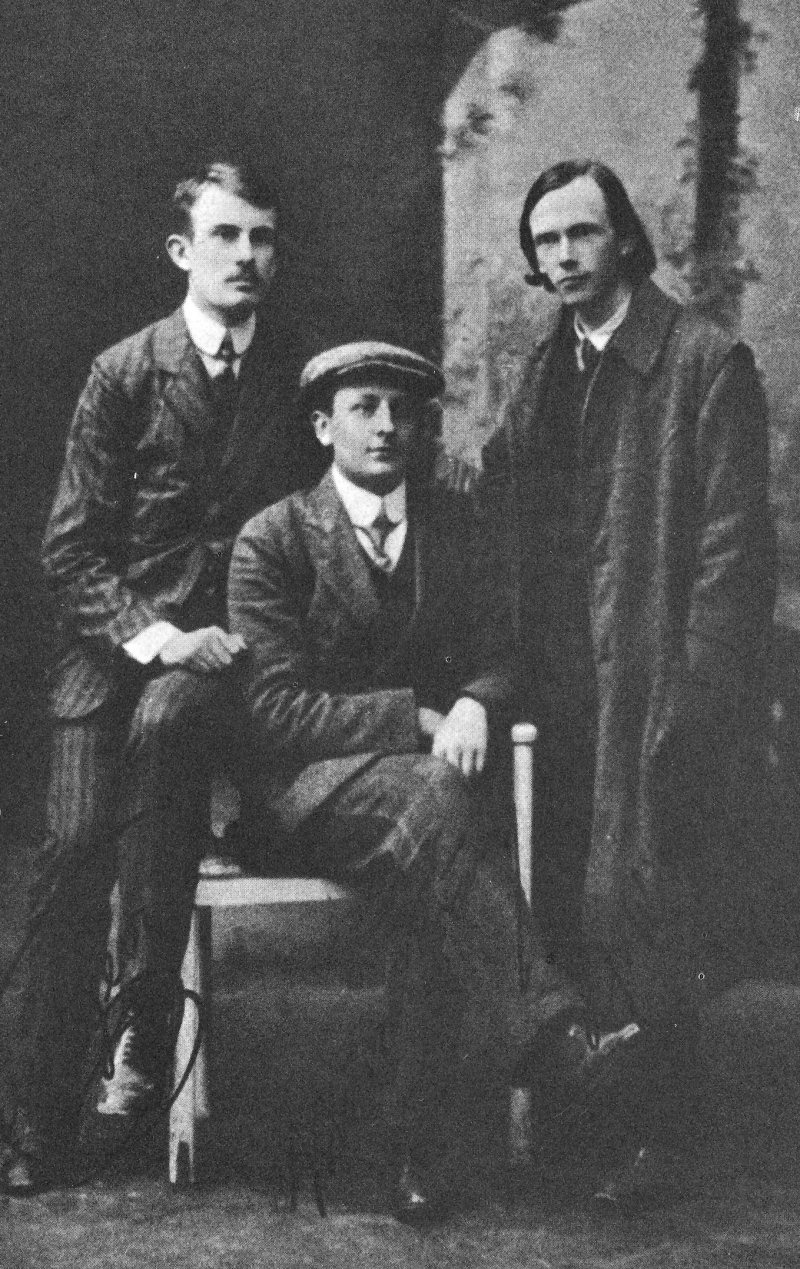
- Tin Ujević, Krešo Kovačić, and Ljubo Wiesner in 1911
- Born: 2 February 1885; Zagreb, Austria-Hungary
- Died: 3 July 1951 (aged 66); Rome, Italy
- Occupations: Poet, editor, translator
- Writing career
- Language: Croatian
- Genre: Poetry
- Notable work: Pjesme (1926)

Ljubo Wiesner (February 2, 1885 in Zagreb – July 3, 1951 in Rome) was a Croatian poet. He was a follower of Antun Gustav Matoš's work.

He founded the publications Grič, Kritika and Savremenik. His introduction to Hrvatska mlada lirika in 1914 defined the poetic style of the followers of Matoš. Wiesner was also active musically, and played gusle. Wiesner translated foreign poetry into Croatian, including works by Walt Whitman. He was an editor of Mate Ujević's Croatian Encyclopedia.

During World War II he worked on the Berlin-based Suradnja. From 1948, until his death he lived in Rome at the Pontifical Croatian College of St. Jerome, where he organized the Vatican's radio program in Croatian.

== Works ==
- Pjesme, Zagreb 1926.
- Pjesme, Zagreb 1943. (expanded edition)
- Izabrana djela, Zagreb 1970.
- Blago veče (izabrane pjesme), Zagreb 2001.
- Studija o A. G. Matošu (fragmenti), Zagreb 2002.
- Sabrana djela (pjesme, feljtoni, studije), Zagreb 2008.
