= List of encyclopedias by branch of knowledge =

List of notable encyclopaedias

This is a list of notable encyclopedias sorted by branch of knowledge. For the purposes of this list, an encyclopedia is defined as a "compendium that contains information on either all branches of knowledge or a particular branch of knowledge." For other sorting standards, see List of encyclopedias.

== General knowledge ==
=== Catalan ===
- Gran Enciclopèdia Catalana – Catalan-language encyclopedia, started in fascicles, and published in 1968 by Edicions 62

=== Chinese ===
- Encyclopedia of China
- Complete Classics Collection of Ancient China – Chinese language encyclopedia completed in 1725 (10 million Chinese characters)
- Yongle Encyclopedia – once contained 11,095 volumes and around 370 million Chinese characters but now contains less than 400 volumes

=== Czech ===
- Otto's encyclopedia – largest Czech-language encyclopedia published between 1888 and 1908 (28 vols) and 1930–1943 (12 vols, incomplete). Volumes 1–28 online
- Příruční slovník naučný – first post-war encyclopedia. With strong communist ideology. Four volumes, 1962–1967.

=== Danish ===
- Den Store Danske Encyklopædi

=== Dutch ===
- Winkler Prins – published in print between 1870 and 1993 and made available digitally to the present day
- Oosthoek – published between 1907 and 1981
- Christelijke Encyclopedie – published between 1926 and 2005
- Eerste Nederlandse Systematisch Ingerichte Encyclopaedie – published between 1946 and 1952
- Grote Nederlandse Larousse Encyclopedie – published between 1971 and 1979
- Grote Spectrum Encyclopedie – published between 1974 and 1980

=== English ===
- Academic American Encyclopedia – 21-volume work published in 1980, also issued by Grolier under the names Barnes & Noble New American Encyclopedia, Global International Encyclopedia, Grolier Academic Encyclopedia, Grolier International Encyclopedia, Lexicon Universal Encyclopedia, and Macmillan Family Encyclopedia
- Chambers's Encyclopaedia – published in 1859 by W. Chambers and R. Chambers
- The Children's Encyclopedia – by Arthur Mee, published 1908–64 in the UK and in the US starting in 1910 as Grolier's The Book of Knowledge
- Children's Illustrated Encyclopedia – published by Dorling Kindersley
- Collier's Encyclopedia
- Columbia Encyclopedia – one-volume encyclopedia from Columbia University Press last published in 2000
- The Complete Compendium of Universal Knowledge (1891)
- Compton's Encyclopedia – 26-volume encyclopedia
- Compton's Interactive Encyclopedia
- Cyclopædia, or an Universal Dictionary of Arts and Sciences – 1728 publication by Ephraim Chambers
- Dobson's Encyclopædia – first encyclopedia printed in the United States, but mostly a reprint of the Encyclopædia Britannica Third Edition
- Edinburgh Encyclopædia – 18 volumes printed and published by William Blackwood and edited by David Brewster between 1808 and 1830
- Encyclopædia Britannica – one of the best-known encyclopedias in English, online-only since 2010
- Encyclopædia Britannica Ultimate Reference Suite – DVD version of Encyclopædia Britannica
- Encyclopædia Metropolitana – 39 volumes in 59 parts published between 1817 and 1845
- Encyclopedia Americana – both a print work and currently a part of Grolier Multimedia Encyclopedia
- English Cyclopaedia – 23 volumes, published 1854–1862
- English Encyclopaedia – 10 volumes, published in 1802
- Everybody's Enquire Within – illustrated book of miscellaneous knowledge issued in weekly instalments from 1937 to 1938
- Everyman's Encyclopaedia – published by Joseph Dent from 1913 as part of the Everyman's Library
- Everything2 – collaborative Web-based database of interlinked user-submitted articles
- Funk & Wagnalls Standard Encyclopedia – first published in 1912; changed its name to Funk & Wagnalls New Standard Encyclopedia in 1931
- Grolier Multimedia Encyclopedia – electronic encyclopedia published by Grolier
- Groliers Encyclopedia
- Harmsworth's Universal Encyclopaedia – edited by John Alexander Hammerton and published 1921–22
- Hutchinson Encyclopedia – single-volume work first published in 1948
- New American Cyclopedia – 16 volumes published between 1857 and 1866
- Nupedia – peer reviewed, open content online encyclopedia project, currently inactive
- Oracle Encyclopædia – five-volume encyclopedia published in 1895
- An Outline of Modern Knowledge – published in 1931 by Victor Gollancz
- Pears Cyclopaedia – one-volume encyclopaedia published annually in the United Kingdom
- World Book Encyclopedia – designed for family use; the world's best selling print encyclopedia

=== French ===
- Découvertes Gallimard – illustrated encyclopaedia in pocket format, 588 volumes plus 150⁺ volumes of spin-offs, published 1986–present
- Encyclopédie, ou dictionnaire raisonné des sciences, des arts et des métiers – contributed by the Encyclopédistes, edited by Denis Diderot and Jean le Rond d'Alembert, published 1751–1772

=== German ===
- Allgemeine Encyclopädie der Wissenschaften und Künste – very large, unfinished 19th-century encyclopaedia by Ersch and Gruber in 167 volumes
- Brockhaus Enzyklopädie – best-known encyclopedia in German, online-only since 2014
- Grosses vollständiges Universal-Lexicon – huge 18th-century encyclopedia by Johann Heinrich Zedler
- Meyers Konversations-Lexikon
- Oeconomische Encyclopädie – Started by Johann Georg Krünitz in 1773 and finished 1858 in 242 volumes

=== Indonesian ===
- Ensiklopedi Umum dalam Bahasa Indonesia – the first encyclopedia in Indonesia
- Mippedia - online encyclopedia general multilingual created by a musician born in city bandung named Rumi Haitami and run and operated by Mippedia Community, an online community.

=== Italian ===
- Treccani – also known as Enciclopedia Italiana di Scienze, Lettere ed Arti

=== Latin ===
- Lexicon Universale – published in 1698

=== Lithuanian ===
- Visuotinė lietuvių enciklopedija

=== Persian ===
- The Book of Healing – 30-volume Persian-language encyclopedia published by Avicenna (Persian: ابن سینا) in 1027 (Arabic: کتاب الشفاء Kitāb al-Šifāʾ, Latin: Sufficientia)
- The Persian Encyclopedia (Persian: دایرةالمعارف فارسی) – three-volume encyclopedia edited by Gholamhossein Mosahab, partially based on the early editions of the Columbia Encyclopedia

=== Polish ===
- Nowe Ateny – published in 1745–1746
- Universal Encyclopedia – 1859, 28 volumes, Orgelbrand
- Wielka Encyklopedia Powszechna PWN – 1962–1970, 13 volumes, PWN
- Wielka Encyklopedia PWN – 2001–2005, 31 volumes, PWN

=== Russian ===
- Brockhaus and Efron – imperial encyclopedia in 86 volumes
- Great Soviet Encyclopedia (Большая Советская Энциклопедия) – second largest and most comprehensive encyclopedia in Russian; there were three editions; the third edition of 1969–78 contains 30 volumes
- Great Russian Encyclopedia – universal Russian encyclopedia, completed in 36 volumes (2004–2017)

=== Slovak ===
- Slovenský náučný slovník. 3 volumes 1932. First general encyclopedia in Slovak language.
- Encyclopaedia Beliana. 20 planned volumes, 1999–, 9 volumes published as of 2021

=== Slovenian ===
- Enciklopedija Slovenije

=== Spanish ===
- Enciclopedia Libre Universal (also known as Enciclopedia Libre) – project to create a Spanish encyclopedia using wiki software, released under the GFDL
- Enciclopedia universal ilustrada europeo-americana – largest encyclopedia of its time; also known as Enciclopedia Espasa o Enciclopedia Espasa-Calpe

=== Swedish ===
- Nationalencyklopedin – encyclopedia in Swedish
- Susning.nu – project to create a Swedish-language encyclopedia using wiki software; an anyone-can-edit encyclopedia until 2004; shut down in 2009

=== Turkish ===
- Anabritannica – published in Turkey and based on the Britannica Micropædia

=== Ukrainian ===
- Ukrainian Soviet Encyclopedia (Українська радянська енциклопедія) – encyclopedia in Ukrainian; its first edition was 17 volumes

=== Multiple languages ===
- Microsoft Encarta – computer-based encyclopedia published by Microsoft, now discontinued
- Wikipedia – world's largest free encyclopedia; a project to create a comprehensive encyclopedia using wiki software

== Specialized encyclopedias ==
=== National, regional, ethnic or cultural ===
==== Australia ====
- Australian Encyclopaedia (1925, 1958, 1977, 1983, 1988, 1996)

==== Austria ====
- aeiou Encyclopedia (1996ff.)

==== Bangladesh ====
- Banglapedia – 10 volumes published in 2003; bilingual; English and Bengali

==== Brazil ====
- Enciclopédia das línguas Arawak – 2020
- Enciclopédia Itaú Cultural de Arte e Cultura Brasileiras – 2001
- História Geral da Civilização Brasileira – 1960–2010
- Saga - A Grande História do Brasil – 1981
- Enciclopédia dos Municípios Piauienses – 1972
- Grandes Personagens da Nossa História – 1969
- Enciclopédia dos Municípios Brasileiros – 1957

==== Canada ====
- The Canadian Encyclopedia (1985 and 1988, CD-ROM and website since, active as of 2025)
- The Junior Encyclopedia of Canada (1990)

==== Croatia ====
- Hrvatska opća enciklopedija (started in 1999 – 7th vol. 2005 of 11)

==== Ethiopia ====
- Encyclopaedia Aethiopica – basic reference work for Ethiopian and Eritrean studies

==== Germany ====
- Deutsche Biographie (Biographical dictionary of Germans)

==== Iceland ====
- Icelandic Encyclopedia A–Ö

==== Iran ====
- Encyclopædia Iranica – on Iranian peoples and Persia
- Encyclopaedia Islamica
- Encyclopaedia of Imam Ali
- The Encyclopedia of Iranian Old Music – published in Tehran, 2000
- Encyclopaedia of Persian Language and Literature – published by the Academy of Persian Language and Literature in Persian in Tehran
- Encyclopaedia of Shia

==== Italy ====
- Dizionario Biografico degli Italiani (Biographical dictionary of Italians) – Istituto dell'Enciclopedia Italiana

==== Malaysia ====
- The Encyclopedia of Malaysia – published from 1998 to 2007

==== New Zealand ====
- The Cyclopedia of New Zealand (1897–1908) – unofficial; most subjects paid to have their articles appear; online at the New Zealand Electronic Text Centre
- An Encyclopaedia of New Zealand (1966–) – official
- Te Ara: The Encyclopedia of New Zealand (2005–) – official, incorporating the full text of An Encyclopaedia of New Zealand

==== Poland ====
- Encyklopedia Polski (Encyclopedia of Poland) – 2005, 10 volumes

==== Portugal ====
- Grande Dicionário Enciclopédico da Madeira (Grand Encyclopædic Dictionary of Madeira) – since 2016
- Enciclopédia Açoriana (Azorean Encyclopædia) – since 2008
- Elucidário Madeirense (Madeiran Glossary) – 1921–1940

==== Slovenia ====
- Enciklopedija Slovenije – published in 1987–2002

==== Sweden ====
- Nordisk familjebok – encyclopedia in Swedish

==== Ukraine ====
- Encyclopedia of Ukraine – English five-volume version of the Encyclopedia of Ukrainian Studies
- Internet Encyclopedia of Ukraine – online version of the Encyclopedia of Ukraine
- Encyclopedia of Modern Ukraine – multi-volume comprehensive encyclopedia about Ukraine from the 20th and 21st centuries

==== United Kingdom ====
- The London Encyclopaedia – 1007-page reference of the city of London; pub. 1983

==== United States ====
- Encyclopedia of Chicago
- Encyclopedia of New Jersey
- The Encyclopedia of New York City
- Handbook of Texas

==== Yugoslavia ====
- Enciklopedija Jugoslavije
- Opća enciklopedija JLZ (1977–82)

=== Field ===
==== Art and architecture ====
- Encyclopedia of Vernacular Architecture of the World – in 3 volumes (1997)
- Grove Dictionary of Art – in 34 volumes (1996)

==== Entertainment ====
- Allgame – comprehensive online guide to computer and video games created by All Media Guide
- Allmovie – comprehensive online guide to movies created by All Media Guide
- Allmusic – comprehensive online guide to music created by All Media Guide
- The Aurum Film Encyclopedia
- The Motion Picture Guide

==== Environmental science ====
- Encyclopedia of Earth (EoE) – electronic reference about the Earth, its natural environments, and their interaction with society
- Encyclopedia of Life Support Systems (EOLSS) – sponsored by UNESCO—an interdisciplinary encyclopedia, inspired by the sustainable development movement

==== Fashion and dress ====
- Berg Encyclopedia of World Dress and Fashion – edited by Joanne B. Eicher, 10 volumes

==== Fiction ====
- The Rocklopedia Fakebandica – by T. Mike Childs, published in 2004
- The Star Trek Encyclopedia
- TV Tropes

==== History and biography ====
- African American National Biography
- Africana – The Encyclopedia of the African and African-American Experience
- American National Biography
- Appleton's Cyclopedia of American Biography – 19th-century American encyclopedia
- Conspiracy Encyclopedia
- An Encyclopedia of World History – single-volume work; First Edition, 1940; Sixth Edition, 2001
- Encyklopedia Polski
- Harper's Encyclopedia of United States History
- Grandes Personagens da Nossa História (Great Figures of our History) – Brazilian encyclopædia published in 1969
- Grandes Personagens da História Universal (Great Figures of World History) – Brazilian encyclopædia published in 1970
- Lexikon des Mittelalters – German encyclopedia of medieval history, published in 1980
- Oxford Classical Dictionary – despite the name, a one-volume encyclopedia for antiquity

==== Law ====
- American Jurisprudence
- Corpus Juris Secundum
- Halsbury's Laws of Australia
- Halsbury's Laws of England
- Stair Memorial Encyclopaedia

===== International and comparative law =====
- Max Planck Encyclopedia of Public International Law

==== Library and Information Science ====
Encyclopedia of Library and Information Sciences

==== Literature ====
- Benet's Reader's Encyclopedia
- Benet's Reader's Encyclopedia of American Literature
- The Cambridge History of English and American Literature
- The Encyclopedia of Science Fiction – first published in 1979 by John Clute and Peter Nicholls
- Encyclopaedia of Indian Literature
- Literary Encyclopedia (Литературная энциклопедия) – 11 volumes, 1929–39 (incomplete; 12th volume draft later published)
- The Literary Encyclopedia – online encyclopedia started in 2000
- The Penguin Encyclopedia of Horror and the Supernatural – published in 1986; edited by Jack Sullivan
- The Poets' Encyclopedia – edited by Michael Andre
- Soviet Concise Literary Encyclopedia – Soviet-era encyclopedia of literature; 9 volumes published between 1962 and 1978
- Cyrillo-Methodian Encyclopedia of the Institute of Literature at the Bulgarian Academy of Sciences from 1985 to 2003.
- Kindlers Literature Encyclopedia – German encyclopedia about world literature. Online-only since 2009.
- Killy Literaturlexikon – German encyclopedia of German authors. Second edition in 12 volumes from 2008 to 2011.

==== Mathematics ====
- CRC Concise Encyclopedia of Mathematics – second edition 2002, based on Mathworld
- Encyclopaedia of Mathematics – published by Springer Verlag in 2002
- Encyclopedia of Cryptography and Security – published by Springer-Verlag in 2005
- Encyclopedia of Statistical Sciences - second edition published by John Wiley & Sons in 2006
- Encyclopedic Dictionary of Mathematics (EDM2) – second edition published in 1993 by The Mathematical Society of Japan
- Klein's encyclopedia – published 1898–1935
- Mathworld – online encyclopedia by Eric Weisstein
- On-Line Encyclopedia of Integer Sequences (OEIS)
- planetmath

==== Medicine ====
- Kitab al-Tasrif (The Method of Medicine) – by Abu al-Qasim al-Zahrawi (Abulcasis)
- The Canon of Medicine – by Avicenna
- Encyclopedia of Public Health
- Medical Compendium in Seven Books – by Paul of Aegina in the 7th century CE; it was the most complete medical encyclopedia in its day
- Taber's Cyclopedic Medical Dictionary

==== Music ====
- Eerste Nederlandse Pop Encyclopedie
- Encyclopedia of Popular Music
- The Grove Dictionary of Music and Musicians
- International Encyclopedia of Women Composers
- Musik in Geschichte und Gegenwart
- The New Grove Dictionary of Opera
- Músicos do Brasil: Uma Enciclopédia Instrumental (Musicians of Brazil: an Instrumental Encyclopædia)

==== Nautical ====
- Bibliography of encyclopedias#Nautical dictionaries and encyclopædias

==== Philosophy ====
- Encyclopedia of Philosophy – edited by Paul Edwards
- Internet Encyclopedia of Philosophy – online encyclopedia
- Routledge Encyclopedia of Philosophy
- Stanford Encyclopedia of Philosophy – online encyclopedia

==== Religion ====
===== Christianity =====
- Agiologio Lusitano – 17th-century (1652–1744) Portuguese encyclopædia on hagiography and ecclesiastical matters
- The Catholic Encyclopedia – 1907–1912 (15 vls.)
- Encyclopædia Biblica
- Encyclopedia of Christianity – John Stephen Bowden, ed., 1 vol., Oxford UP, 2006
- Encyclopedia of Mormonism
- Lexikon für Theologie und Kirche – 1930–38 (10 vls.)
- New Catholic encyclopedia – 1967–96 (15 vls. and 4 supplementary vls.); 2. ed. 2003 (15 vls.)
- Theologische Realenzyklopädie (TRE) – ed. Gerhard Müller. 38 vls.; Berlin 1977–2007
- Twentieth Century Encyclopedia of Catholicism – Hawthorn Books. 150 vls.; New York City 1958–1971

===== Islam =====
- Encyclopaedia Islamica
- Encyclopaedia of Imam Ali
- Encyclopaedia of Islam
- Encyclopaedia of Shia
- The Hussaini Encyclopedia
- Urdu Encyclopaedia of Islam or Urdu Daira Maarif Islamiya (Urdu: اردو دائرہ معارف اسلامیہ) is the largest Islamic encyclopedia published in Urdu by University of the Punjab.
- Islami Bishwakosh

===== Judaism =====
- Encyclopaedia Judaica – published 1972–91, second edition 2006
- Jewish Encyclopedia – published 1901–06; original full 12 volumes
- Shorter Jewish Encyclopedia in Russian – 11 volumes, published 1976–2005 in Jerusalem
- Talmudic Encyclopedia
- The YIVO Encyclopedia of Jews in Eastern Europe – Yale University Press, 2008

===== Hinduism =====
- Encyclopedia of Hinduism – published 2012

==== Science ====
- Encyclopedia Astronautica – reference website maintained by space-travel enthusiast Mark Wade
- Encyclopedia of Analytical Chemistry – Wiley, 2000, 15 volumes
- Encyclopedia of Flora and Fauna of Bangladesh
- Encyclopedia of Genetics
- Encyclopedia of Life Sciences (ELS) – owned by John Wiley & Sons; both a 20-volume print edition and an online edition
- The Illustrated Science and Invention Encyclopedia
- McGraw-Hill Encyclopedia of Science and Technology – also available in a one-volume edition
- The New Encyclopedia of Snakes
- Larousse Encyclopædia of Animal Life

==== Engineering ====
===== Chemical Engineering =====
- Ullmann's Encyclopedia of Industrial Chemistry – currently in its 7th edition; first edition in German available in the public domain.

==== Social sciences ====
- International Encyclopedia of the Social & Behavioral Sciences – edited by Neil Smelser and Paul Baltes, 26 vls., Elsevier, 2001
- International Encyclopedia of the Social Sciences – edited by David L. Sills, New York, New York (etc.); Macmillan, 1968
- International Encyclopedia of the Social Sciences – edited by William A. Darity, Jr., Detroit (etc.); Macmillan Reference USA, 2008

===== Economics =====
- The New Palgrave Dictionary of Economics – 2nd Edition (2008)

==== Sports ====
- The Baseball Encyclopedia
- Total Baseball, The Ultimate Baseball Encyclopedia – 2004, by John Thorn et al.
- World Sports Encyclopedia – 2003, Atena/MBI

==== Other ====
- Atlas of the Prehistoric World
- Above and Beyond: The Encyclopedia of Aviation and Space Sciences
- Christie's World Encyclopedia of Champagne & Sparkling Wine
- Encyclopedia of Cybernetics
- Encyclopedia of Marxism – online encyclopedia released under the GNU Free Documentation License, part of the Marxist Internet Archive.
- The Grocer's Encyclopedia
- Illustrated Encyclopedia of Aircraft
- Larousse Gastronomique – encyclopedia of food and cooking
- A Military Encyclopedia
- Mining Encyclopedia
- MusicBrainz – project to create a free music encyclopedia, released under the Open Content License; the first goal is to create a database similar to CDDB
- The Oxford Companion to Wine
- Perelman's Pocket Cyclopedia of Cigars – encyclopedia and history of (Non-Cuban) cigars and their manufacturers (also Perelman's Pocket Cyclopaedia of Havana Cigars)
- The Sotheby's Wine Encyclopedia
- Pequena Enciclopédia de Moral e Civismo (Little Encyclopædia of Morality and Civism) – Brazilian state-sponsored school encyclopædia during the military dictatorship
- Encyclopedia Recipica – Encyclopedia of Recipe

== See also ==
- List of encyclopedias by language
- List of encyclopedias by date
- List of online encyclopedias
- Lists of encyclopedias
