= Jacob Wesley Ulm =

American physician-researcher & author (born 1974)

- Born: October 9, 1974 (age 51)
- Known for: Autor de artículos sobre salud y bienestar general en importantes revistas

Jacob Wesley Ulm (born October 9, 1974) is an American physician-researcher, author, and bioinformatician at the National Institutes of Health, best known for his widely published health commentaries and articles for the general public, appearing during and after the COVID-19 pandemic. He has been consulted and published in publications and media including Forbes, Parade, Shape, Verywell Health, Medical News Today, Newsweek, Times of India, Healthline, Eat This, Not That, Yahoo!, MSN, Business Insider, Best Life, Care.com, and a number of other major outlets in the U.S. and overseas.

== Early life, education, and career ==
Ulm grew up in Alexandria, Virginia, where he was a National Merit Scholar, Governor's Language Academy Honoree, and state spelling champion at T.C. Williams High School (now Alexandria City High School) before graduating valedictorian in 1992. He completed a B.S. in chemistry and concentration in biochemistry at Duke University, summa cum laude, followed by an MSTP-supported joint MD and PhD degree from Harvard Medical School and MIT, with a doctoral thesis focusing on retroviral gene therapy.

He then undertook postdoctoral research and clinical training in Los Angeles and Pittsburgh before specializing in bioinformatics and joining the National Center for Biotechnology Information.

== Personal life ==
While in medical school, Ulm became a multi-day champion on the quiz show Jeopardy! and advanced to the 1998 Tournament of Champions. He has published poetry and prose works since middle school, including a novel in the visionary and metaphysical fiction genre, and trained formally in the sciences since age 11 in a young researchers mentorship under Dr. George Carruthers at the Naval Research Lab.

A singer and songwriter, he later founded an alternative rock musical collaboration, J. Wes Ulm and Kant's Konundrum, releasing a debut EP and award-winning music video, followed by recognition as a semifinalist in the International Songwriting Competition for subsequent productions.

== Publications and books ==
Selected published health commentaries and articles, COVID-related:

- Updates on the R-1 COVID-19 variant, Shape
- Significance and prospects of COVID becoming endemic, Parade
- COVID booster shots for seniors, Care.com
- Parents and the new COVID-19 variants, Verywell Family
- COVID reinfection concerns, Eat This, Not That
- COVID booster options and mixing-and-matching, Best Life
- Mixing-and-matching of COVID-19 boosters in Thailand and Vietnam, Media Magelang (in Indonesian),

Selected published health commentaries and articles, general health:

- Common flu symptoms to be aware of, Forbes
- Pediatric RSV hospitalization, Business Insider
- Manifestations of congestive heart failure, Eat This, Not That
- ChatGPT and other Chatbot-generated resources for general health, Health Reporter
- Anti-inflammatory prospective therapy for Alzheimer's disease, Medical News Today
- Elevated blood pressure variability and relation to dementia risk, Healthline
- Pharmacokinetics and mechanism of action of benazepril, other ACE inhibitors, and additional blood pressure drugs, SingleCare
- Physiological heat tolerance, Times of India
- Manifestations of frequent beer drinking, The Healthy (A Reader's Digest publication)

Selected specialist biomedical articles:

- Modulation of viral tropism and cellular restriction based on retroviral capsid components, Virology
- Drug repurposing for COVID-19, Transboundary and Emerging Diseases
- Drug repositioning for Duchenne muscular dystrophy, Frontiers in Cell and Developmental Biology
- Basic foundations of gene therapy, Wiley, Encyclopedia of Genetics

Selected non-health and non-biomedical articles:

- Macroeconomic metrics (including GDP) and significance of non-debt purchasing power, Newsweek, International Policy Digest and The Birmingham News
- Nexus between medicine and music, Harvard Medicine Magazine
- Critique of social Darwinist themes, Democracy Journal
  - Adapted and republished in Utne Reader

== Awards and recognition ==
- National Merit Scholar
- Second prize, annual Neurofibromatosis Prize for Research Ideas competition, sponsored by National Neurofibromatosis Foundation and the International Neurofibromatosis Association
