= International Encyclopedia of the Social Sciences =

Encyclopedia first published in 1968

- First edition
- Author: William A. Darity Jr.
- Subject: Social science
- Publisher: Macmillan Reference USA
- Publication date: 2008
- ISBN: 978-0-02-865965-7
- Preceded by: Encyclopaedia of the Social Sciences (1930–35)

The International Encyclopedia of the Social Sciences was first published in 1968 and was edited by David L. Sills and Robert K. Merton. It contains seventeen volumes and thousands of entries written by scholars around the world. The 2nd edition is composed entirely of new articles. It was published in 2008 and edited by William A. Darity Jr., an American economist.

The 1968 Encyclopedia was initially intended to "complement, not supplant" MacMillan's earlier, fifteen-volume Encyclopaedia of the Social Sciences, which had been published from 1930 to 1967 and was edited by American economists Edwin Robert Anderson Seligman and Alvin Saunders Johnson, it effectively replaced the earlier Encyclopaedia, in practice.

== See also ==
- List of encyclopedias by branch of knowledge
- Encyclopaedia of the Social Sciences (1930–35)
- International Encyclopedia of the Social and Behavioral Sciences (2001)
