= Croatian Encyclopedia =

Croatian print and online encyclopedia

- Editors: Dalibor Brozović, August Kovačec, Slaven Ravlić
- Original title: Hrvatska enciklopedija
- Language: Croatian
- Subject: General
- Genre: Reference encyclopedia
- Publisher: Miroslav Krleža Institute of Lexicography
- Publication date: 1999–2009 (print), 2013– (online)
- Publication place: Croatia
- Media type: 11 volumes (hardbound), online
- ISBN: 953-6036-31-2
- OCLC: 247866724

The Croatian Encyclopedia (Croatian: Hrvatska enciklopedija) is a Croatian general encyclopedia (with the national component), published in 1999–2009 by the Miroslav Krleža Institute of Lexicography.

== History ==
The project began in 1999, and it represents a fifth iteration of the encyclopedic tradition that was established by Mate Ujević's Croatian Encyclopedia, and continued in the Encyclopedia of the Lexicographical Institute, as well as the two editions of its General Encyclopedia. Eleven volumes were published in the period 1999–2009, with a new volume appearing every year.

It is named "Croatian" encyclopedia in the tradition of general-knowledge encyclopedias as Britannica.

== Online edition ==
The free-access online edition of the Croatian Encyclopedia has been available since 2013. Paper volumes are no longer published.

Since 2021, the online encyclopedia has been managed by a new, fourth editor-in-chief, Bruno Kragić, with a team of 14 editors, and updated on a weekly basis.

== Volumes ==
Volume number	Editor-In-Chief	Year	Pages
I. : A – Bd	Dalibor Brozović	1999	674
II. : Be – Da	Dalibor Brozović	2000	723
III. : Da – Fo	Dalibor Brozović	2001	722
IV. : Fr – Ht	Dalibor Brozović	2002	753
V. : Hu – Km	August Kovačec	2003	725
VI. : Kn – Mak	August Kovačec	2004	786
VII. : Mal – Nj	August Kovačec	2005	814
VIII. : O – Pre	Slaven Ravlić	2006	773
IX. : Pri – Sk	Slaven Ravlić	2007	842
X. : Sl – To	Slaven Ravlić	2008	830
XI. : Tr – Ž	Slaven Ravlić	2009	859

Printed volumes total 9272 pages and 67,077 articles, with a total of 1,059,000 lines of text. It represents a combined effort of 1070 authors, mainly associates.

== See also ==
- Encyclopedia of Yugoslavia
