= Encyclopaedia of the Social Sciences =

- 1937 edition
- Author: Edwin Robert Anderson Seligman and Alvin Saunders Johnson
- Subject: Social science
- Publisher: Macmillan Publishers
- Publication date: 1930-1967
- LC Class: 30003962
- Followed by: International Encyclopedia of the Social Sciences

The Encyclopaedia of the Social Sciences is a specialized fifteen-volume Encyclopedia first published in 1930 and last published in 1967. It was envisaged in the 1920s by scholars working in disciplines which increasingly were coming to be known as "human sciences" or "social sciences". The goal was to create a comprehensive synthesis of the study of human affairs as undertaken by practitioners of all fields involved in such study. The parameters of what would come to be known as "social science" were in many ways initially established and defined by this publication.

The Encyclopaedia's founding organizations included the American Anthropological Association, the American Association of Social Workers, the American Economic Association, the American Historical Association, the American Political Science Association, the American Psychological Association, the American Sociological Society, the American Statistical Association, the Association of American Law Schools, and the National Education Association. It was edited by American economists Edwin Robert Anderson Seligman and Alvin Saunders Johnson. Seligman and Johnson solicited contributions from many of the most known and respected scholars in their fields, and established many links with European scholars in the process. The Rockefeller Foundation, Carnegie Foundation, and Russell Sage Foundation provided initial financial support, and Macmillan was selected as publisher.

The international network of social scientists developed in the process of creating the Encyclopaedia would prove especially important during the Nazi occupation of Europe, during which many contributing scholars fled persecution for their ideas. Under Johnson's invitation, several of these scholars would come to New York City and form the "University in Exile", a specialized graduate school now known as the New School for Social Research.

The Encyclopaedia was last printed in 1967, then in its 16th edition. It was succeeded by the International Encyclopedia of the Social Sciences, edited by David L. Sills, and also published by Macmillan.

== See also ==
- List of encyclopedias by branch of knowledge
- International Encyclopedia of the Social Sciences (1968)
- International Encyclopedia of the Social & Behavioral Sciences (2001)
