= Tuđmanism =

Form of Croatian nationalism

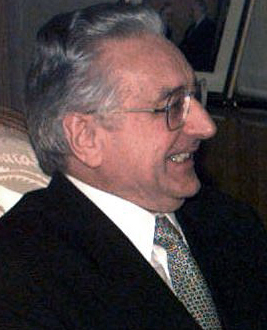
Franjo Tuđman, President of Croatia from 1991 until 1999

Tuđmanism or Tudjmanism (Croatian: tuđmanizam) is a form of Croatian nationalism which reached its strongest peak during the administration of Croatia's first president, Franjo Tuđman. Tuđman himself defined the ideology as non-communist nationalism with "re-examined Croatian history".

According to Croatian historian Ivo Banac, Tudjmanism united both dominant strands of Croatian anti-liberalism, that is, Croatian fascist-sympathisers and Croatian communists of the former Socialist Republic of Croatia. Croatian political scientist Slaven Ravlić defines Tuđmanism to be the name both for an ideology and for a regime. According to Ravlić, the ideology contains elements of deification of the Croatian people started by Ante Starčević, a continuation of the 20th-century conservative tradition that rejects liberal democracy, and a mix of ideas represented by neoconservatism. The resulting regime was authoritarian, it created a form of crony capitalism, and engaged in the creation of an ideological hegemony.

== Historiography ==
In the twilight years of Yugoslavia following the death of Josip Broz Tito, Yugoslav society saw the increasing proliferation of media and publications which espoused alternative views of politics and history which deviated from the state-sanctioned official narratives of the communist regime, in particular the increase of nationalist perspectives which were either suppressed or softened during the communist era and its official ideology of "brotherhood and unity" of different national groups and opposition to nationalist separatism. Tuđman himself had been taking part in such debates for decades before the collapse of the Yugoslavia.

Tuđman had been a member of the Yugoslav communist partisans during World War II, and after the war had been a "true believer" of the state ideology until being converting to Croatian nationalism in the 1960s, and was also jailed on multiple occasions, including after the Croatian Spring movement in 1971. Tudjman even named his own writings on historiography, which political scientist David Bruce MacDonald described as 'egocentric' and sometimes 'messianic', after himself, dubbing it 'Tudjmanism'.

One of the most common debates was about the death toll of Serbian victims at Jasenovac concentration camp under the fascist Independent State of Croatia during World War II, which had been exaggerated by communist authorities, and likewise heavily underestimated by Croatian nationalist writers. In fact, he had been writing on the subject since the mid-1960's, being consistently censured by authorities for doing so, as well. Tuđman published a work entitled Wilderness of Historical Reality in 1987 which claimed that such "Jasenovac distortion" was a tool for Serbian control to keep "Croatianness in shackles" and "instigate Serbdom against Croatianness":

There is also the systematic creation of the black legend of historical guilt of the entire Croatian nation. For if the dimensions of the Ustasha crime are stretched to hundreds of thousands and even millions of victims, and if, by contrast, there are no commensurate crimes on the opposite side, then the responsibility for the crimes does not fall upon a mere handful of Pavelić’s fanatical followers, blinded by vengeful impulses, but on the entire Croatian nation. From this point, it follows logically that... Croatianness can be equated with Ustashism which is branded as worse than Fascism or Nazism.

— Franjo Tuđman, Horrors of War: Historical Reality and Philosophy–Revised Edition, translated by Katrina Mijatović (1996), Page 15

== Politics ==
=== Domestic ===
Although he rejected Yugoslav communism, Tuđman did not outright embrace the radical Ustaše ideology either, developing a fresh Croatian nationalism based around his own ideas and personality. One way in which he secured his position as the most influential nationalist leader was by obtaining considerable funds from the well-coordinated Croatian diaspora, which was "solidly anti-communist" and contained many families who had emigrated from Yugoslavia out of opposition to Titoism, and thus avoided the purges of local nationalists.

Tuđman took a pragmatic approach when seeking to establish an independent Croatian state, as he sought the support of both nationalists as well as those with a recent history in the communist system. This led to the so-called policy of reconciliation, embraced by Tuđman, and which had precedence with Maks Luburić and later Bruno Bušić as well.

Under his tenure as president, Tuđman swiftly established hegemony in the Croatian government early on and introduced strong state control over the media as a means of spreading the HDZ's ideology to the public. In some instances, journalists of mixed parentage (that is, half-Croat and half-Serb) were criticised as "enemies of Croatia" and dismissed from their positions. Those who spoke out against the regime during Croatian War of Independence were often censored or punished; in one instance, editors of the satirical Feral Tribune were drafted into the military after criticising him. These processes ran parallel to similar consolidations of political power and state-media propagation of nationalism that were occurring in Slobodan Milošević's Serbia.

=== Geopolitics ===
Tuđman had long expressed irredentist impulses towards Bosnia and Herzegovina, both as an earlier writer and later as a statesman, which he believed to be part of the 'Greater Croatia' idea. At one point, he said that Croatia looked like "an apple with a bite taken out of it," in reference to Bosnia and Herzegovina. He is known to have supported the partition of Bosnia-Herzegovina with Serbia, and also supported the Croatian Republic of Herzeg-Bosnia forces against Bosniak forces during the Croat–Bosniak War period.

In his earlier writings, Tudman also showed a negative view of the Balkans and believed that Croatia had historically belonged to Central European and Mediterranean civilisation, and that it was these geo-cultural regions which Croatia had to orient itself towards. In relation to Yugoslavism, he remarked that "our political links with the Balkans between 1918 and 1990 were just a short episode in the Croatian history, and we are determined not to repeat that episode ever again!" Nonetheless, his policies towards the Bosnian War brought him at odds with the international community and European Union. As a result, the latter half of his administration saw relative geopolitical isolation, as well as economic stagnation.

Logo of the Croatian Democratic Union

== Legacy ==
The continuance of Tudjmanist postures in his Croatian Democratic Union (HDZ) has seen at least three processes. The first was the so-called de-titoisation, and the subsequence arrival of the Tudjmanist era from 1989 until shortly after Tuđman's death. It was in 2000 that Ivo Sanader became president of the HDZ, after which there de-tudjmanisation, which moderated the party's orientation to a centre-right position. This lasted until he was expelled from the party in 2010. He was succeeded by his deputy, Jadranka Kosor. Afterwards, in May 2012, the HDZ elected a new president, Tomislav Karamarko, under whom the party returned to a relatively more hardline position, which has been called a re-tudjmanisation of the HDZ.

In a June 2011 poll by the Večernji list newspaper, 62% of respondents gave the most credit to Tuđman for the creation of an independent Croatia. In December 2014, an Ipsos Puls survey of 600 people found that 56% of the respondents see him as a positive figure, 27% said he had both positive and negative aspects, while only 14% regard him as a negative figure.

== Literature ==
- MacDonald, David Bruce (2002). Balkan Holocausts?: Serbian and Croatian Victim-Centred Propaganda and the War in Yugoslavia. Manchester University Press. ISBN 9780719064678.
- Ravlić, Slaven (June 2006). "Eponimizacija ideološke promjene u Hrvatskoj 1989-2005" [The Eponymisation of Ideological Change in Croatia 1989-2005] (PDF). Anali Hrvatskog politološkog društva (in Croatian). 2 (1).
