= Peyman Benharash =

Cardiovascular Surgeon at UCLA known for ECMO and publishing papers

Peyman Benharash (born in Tehran, Iran) is an American cardiothoracic surgeon, academic, and researcher at the University of California, Los Angeles (UCLA). He is a Professor-in-Residence of Surgery and Bioengineering at the David Geffen School of Medicine at UCLA, and serves as Director of the ECMO Program at UCLA Health and Executive Director of the Center for Advanced Surgical and Interventional Technology (CASIT).

== Early life and education ==
Benharash immigrated to Los Angeles in high school and completed all of his undergraduate, graduate, and professional degrees at UCLA. He earned a Bachelor of Science and a Master of Science in Chemistry from UCLA in 1998, followed by a Doctor of Medicine degree from the David Geffen School of Medicine at UCLA in 2002.

== Medical training ==
Following medical school, Benharash undertook a General Surgery Residency at Harbor-UCLA Medical Center (2002–2008). During this period, he spent time at Stanford University conducting research in stem cell therapies for cardiovascular applications. He then returned to UCLA to complete a Cardiothoracic Surgery Fellowship at the David Geffen School of Medicine / UCLA Medical Center (2008–2010).

== Academic career ==
Benharash joined the UCLA faculty in 2010 as Associate Professor of Surgery, a position he held until 2023. In 2024, he was promoted to Professor of Surgery and Bioengineering. He holds a joint appointment at the UCLA Samueli School of Engineering as Professor-in-Residence.

His current administrative and programmatic roles at UCLA Health include:

- Director, ECMO (Extracorporeal Life Support) Program at UCLA Health
- Executive Director, Center for Advanced Surgical and Interventional Technology (CASIT)
- Associate Program Director, UCLA Thoracic Surgery Residency Program
- Director, UCLA Cardiovascular Outcomes Research Laboratories (CORELAB)

== Clinical practice ==
Benharash specializes in acquired cardiac diseases in adults. His clinical practice ranges from traditional open cardiac operations to minimally invasive, hybrid, and catheter-based therapies. He introduced minimally invasive arrhythmia surgery to UCLA, a technique that treats atrial fibrillation with reduced pain and blood loss compared to conventional surgical approaches.

He is board certified in Thoracic Cardiovascular Surgery by the ABMS. He speaks English and Spanish.

=== ECMO and high-profile cases ===
As Director of the UCLA ECMO Program, Benharash has expanded mobile ECMO services throughout Southern California. In 2021, he and his mobile ECMO team received national media attention after treating a pregnant woman with severe COVID-19 who was placed on life support at a Glendale-area hospital. His team transported her to Ronald Reagan UCLA Medical Center, where she survived with her pregnancy intact.

Benharash was also featured in a Los Angeles Times Column One story on ECMO and COVID-19 patients, in which his clinical decision-making during a critical ECMO transfer for a critically ill patient was described in detail.

Benharash also co-authored an article on Jama Network that shows the processes of ECMO.

== Research ==
=== CORELAB and health services research ===
In 2013, Benharash founded the UCLA Cardiovascular Outcomes Research Laboratories (CORELAB), a nationally recognized research group that uses large national databases to study cardiovascular and surgical outcomes. His research group has produced findings on healthcare disparities including a 2024 study showing that heart transplant patients from socioeconomically deprived areas face higher risks for complications and earlier death, even at high quality hospitals. CORELAB is also recognized for training future leaders in academic surgery.

Benharash also did a study featured in Medical News Today, showing an increase in the severity of gunshot wounds from 2005-2016. He and his team found that the cost of gunshot wounds increased as well.

=== Surgical technology and simulation ===
Through CASIT, Benharash's laboratory develops noninvasive physiologic sensors and physics-based models intended for virtual surgical simulation and pre-operative planning. This work encompasses cardiovascular simulation, machine learning assessment of surgical skills, and cardiac tissue engineering using stem cells.

=== Funding and publications ===
Benharash has served as principal investigator on major grants funded by the United States Department of Defense and as co-investigator on interdisciplinary cardiovascular research projects. He has authored over 400 peer-reviewed manuscripts, many in high-impact journals, spanning topics including aortic valve replacement, tricuspid valve surgery, limb ischemia, surgical disparities, and esophageal cancer.

His research has been covered in outlets including MedPage Today and tctmd.com (a publication of the Cardiovascular Research Foundation).

== Selected publications ==
- Sakowitz S, Benharash P. "Regionalization, Not Without Consequences." Ann Thorac Surg. 2026 Jan 31. PMID 41671843.
- Ali K, et al. "In-Hospital Outcomes After Tricuspid Valve Surgery in the United States: Impact of Surgical Center Volumes." JACC Adv. 2026 Feb 12; 5(3):102594. PMID 41687406.
- Aguayo E, et al. "Surgical versus transcatheter aortic valve replacement in patients with prior coronary artery bypass graft surgery." Surgery. 2026 Apr; 192:110086. PMID 41671843.
- Alipour A, et al. "Integration of spatiotemporal features into machine learning assessment of open surgical skills." Surgery. 2026 Apr; 192:110079. PMID 41610682.

(Full list of publications available via UCLA Profiles: https://profiles.ucla.edu/peyman.benharash)
