= Slaven Ravlić =

- Born: 1 April 1951 (age 74); Slivno, Yugoslavia
- Occupations: lexicographer, politologist and sociologist
- Years active: 1974–present

Slaven Ravlić (born 1 April 1951) is a Croatian lexicographer, politologist and sociologist.

He was born in Slivno near Pelješac. He graduated in 1974 and received his PhD in 1998 at the Faculty of Political Sciences in Zagreb on a thesis titled "Liberalism and democracy in the political theory of John Stuart Mill". He was the editor of the book series (1980–84) and magazine Naše teme (1977–82). Since 1992 he is employed at the Miroslav Krleža Lexicographical Institute, where, among other things, he served as the deputy editor (2001–05) of Croatian Encyclopedia, and since 2005 as the Editor-in-Chief.

He teaches sociology at the Faculty of Law, University of Zagreb since 2005.

== Works ==
- Poredak slobode: Politička misao Johna Stuarta Milla (in Croatian), Zagreb: Croatian Philosophical Society, 2001, ISBN 953-164-050-5
- Suvremene političke ideologije (in Croatian), Zagreb: Politička kultura, 2003, ISBN 953-6213-28-1
- Eponimi u znanosti i politici (in Croatian), Zagreb: Super velika akcija, 2007, ISBN 978-953-222-267-8
- Svjetovi ideologije. Uvod u političke ideologije (in Croatian), Zagreb: Politička kultura, 2013, ISBN 978-953-258-057-0
- Liberalna demokracija: izazovi i iskušenja (in Croatian), Zagreb: Plejada, 2017, ISBN 978-953-7782-51-1
