= Psych Central =

Mental health website

- Headquarters: Fort Mill, South Carolina
- Owner: Healthline (Red Ventures)
- Website: psychcentral.com

Psych Central is a mental health information and news website. Psych Central is overseen by mental health professionals who create and oversee all the content published on the site. The site was created in 1995. The site was named as one of the Internet's 50 Best Websites in 2008 by Time, and has approximately 6 million unique visitors per month. PsychCentral was acquired by Healthline (Red Ventures) in August 2020. Former attorney and author, Faye McCray was appointed Editor-In-Chief in 2021.

== Features ==
Consumers are Psych Central's target audience, as the site offers informational articles about mental health, relationships, personality, and helping people better understand themselves.

Prior to its sale to Healthline, Psych Central had over 200 blogs that are written by psychologists, psychiatrists and people with lived experience, as well as a mental health news bureau that publishes up to five stories per day. One of the more prominent blogs is devoted to celebrity mental health issues.

The site has a large collection of mental health and psychology articles that discuss the symptoms and treatments of mental illness, personality, parenting, relationships, and related topic areas.

Other features include dozens of tests and screening measures, including an Attention Deficit Disorder (ADHD), mania and obsessive-compulsive disorder test and a Narcissistic Personality Quiz.

== History ==
Psych Central was founded by John M. Grohol, Psy.D. in 1991. Grohol was a Florida psychology graduate student who began answering mental health questions in numerous mental health Usenet newsgroups, which he turned to after losing a friend to suicide. In 1995, Grohol began a weekly online mental health chat which continued on the Psych Central website. Grohol stated that one of the reasons he founded Psych Central was because he lost his childhood best friend to untreated depression.

In 2011, the journal Pediatrics was criticized by Psych Central for publishing a paper on "Facebook depression," which Psych Central called a "made-up term for a phenomenon that doesn't exist."

In 2009, a study published in The Journal of Neuroscience suggested that marijuana could potentially provide relief from the symptoms of PTSD. The research was reviewed by Psych Central.

== Online support groups ==
Before its sale to Healthline, Psych Central had over 250 support groups spread out over two communities: Psych Central Forums and a neurological support community, NeuroTalk. The combined membership of these two communities is over 600,000 members. After its sale, the forums changed their name to My Support Forums and became independent, but are still overseen by Dr. Grohol.

== Evaluation and criticism ==
The journal Health and Social Work ran an analysis on the quality of online health-related information regarding schizophrenia. WebMD scored the highest with a 91 percent endorsement. MedicineNet.com had an 89 percent endorsement rate, and Psych Central's section called "Schizophrenia and Psychosis" had an 88 percent endorsement rate. The journal concluded that all sites examined offered quality information on schizophrenia.

The journal Cyberpsychology, Behavior, and Social Networking ran an analysis on the quality of online mental health-related information across the 11 most commonly-searched for mental disorders. The researchers found that search engines "regularly returned Web sites that were of good or better quality health information." Psych Central was cited as one of the top two mental health-focused Web sites returning search results for this analysis.

In 2001, the Los Angeles Times cautioned that Psych Central "...is as much a vehicle for self-promotion as it is a consumer guide. [Grohol] advertises his book...He spends less energy doing evaluations of outside resources."
