= Encyclopedia of Yugoslavia =

1955–1990 Yugoslav national encyclopedia

- Encyclopedia's logotype
- Original title: Enciklopedija Jugoslavije / Енциклопедија Југославије (Serbo-Croatian); Enciklopedija Jugoslavije (Slovene); Енциклопедија на Југославија (Macedonian); Enciklopedia e Jugosllavisë (Albanian); Jugoszláv Enciklopédia (Hungarian)
- Language: Serbo-Croatian / Latin alphabet; Serbo-Croatian / Cyrillic alphabet; Slovenian; Macedonian; Albanian; Hungarian
- Subject: General reference & Yugoslavistics
- Genre: encyclopedia
- Published: 1955–1971 (complete first edition); 1980–1990 (incomplete second edition)
- Publisher: Yugoslav Lexicographical Institute, Zagreb, SR Croatia
- Publication place: SFR Yugoslavia
- OCLC: 7982525

The Encyclopedia of Yugoslavia (Note: Serbo-Croatian: Enciklopedija Jugoslavije / Енциклопедија Југославије, Slovene: Enciklopedija Jugoslavije, Macedonian: Енциклопедија на Југославија, Albanian: Enciklopedia e Jugosllavisë, Hungarian: Jugoszláv Enciklopédia) or Yugoslavika was the national encyclopedia of the Socialist Federal Republic of Yugoslavia. Published under the auspices of the Yugoslav Lexicographical Institute in Zagreb and overseen by Miroslav Krleža, it is a prominent source and comprehensive reference work about Yugoslavia and related topics.

The Encyclopedia of Yugoslavia comprised eight volumes in its first edition, published between 1955 and 1971. The second edition, initiated in 1980, encountered obstacles due to the Yugoslav Wars, resulting in only six of the planned twelve volumes being published. Despite its academic and cultural significance, the encyclopaedia was ultimately discontinued while the publishing house, reorganized from federal Yugoslav into Croatian institution, subsequently initiated the Croatian Encyclopedia project.

== History ==
=== Earlier Encyclopedias ===
In the latter half of the 19th century South Slavs made some of the first modern-era efforts to compile an encyclopaedia. At that time, five volumes of the Croatian Encyclopaedia were planned out of which only one was ultimately published. The next abortive effort at common South Slavic encyclopaedia envisaged inclusion of Bulgaria with sponsorship streaming from institutions such as Yugoslav Academy of Sciences and Arts (Zagreb), Serbian Royal Academy of Sciences (Belgrade), Matica hrvatska (Zagreb) and Slovene Society (Ljubljana). The first National Serbian-Croatian-Slovene Encyclopaedia was published Bibliographical Institute in Zagreb between 1925 and 1929 in Cyrillic and Latin version under the editorship of Serbian historian and academic Stanoje Stanojević but the work was described as not reaching the standards of the first class encyclopaedia. The new efforts at publishing the Croatian Encyclopaedia were initiated in 1938, before the beginning of the World War II, with first volume published in 1941, and publication continued during the existence of the quisling Independent State of Croatia until 1945 when the project was abolished.

=== Encyclopedia of Yugoslavia ===
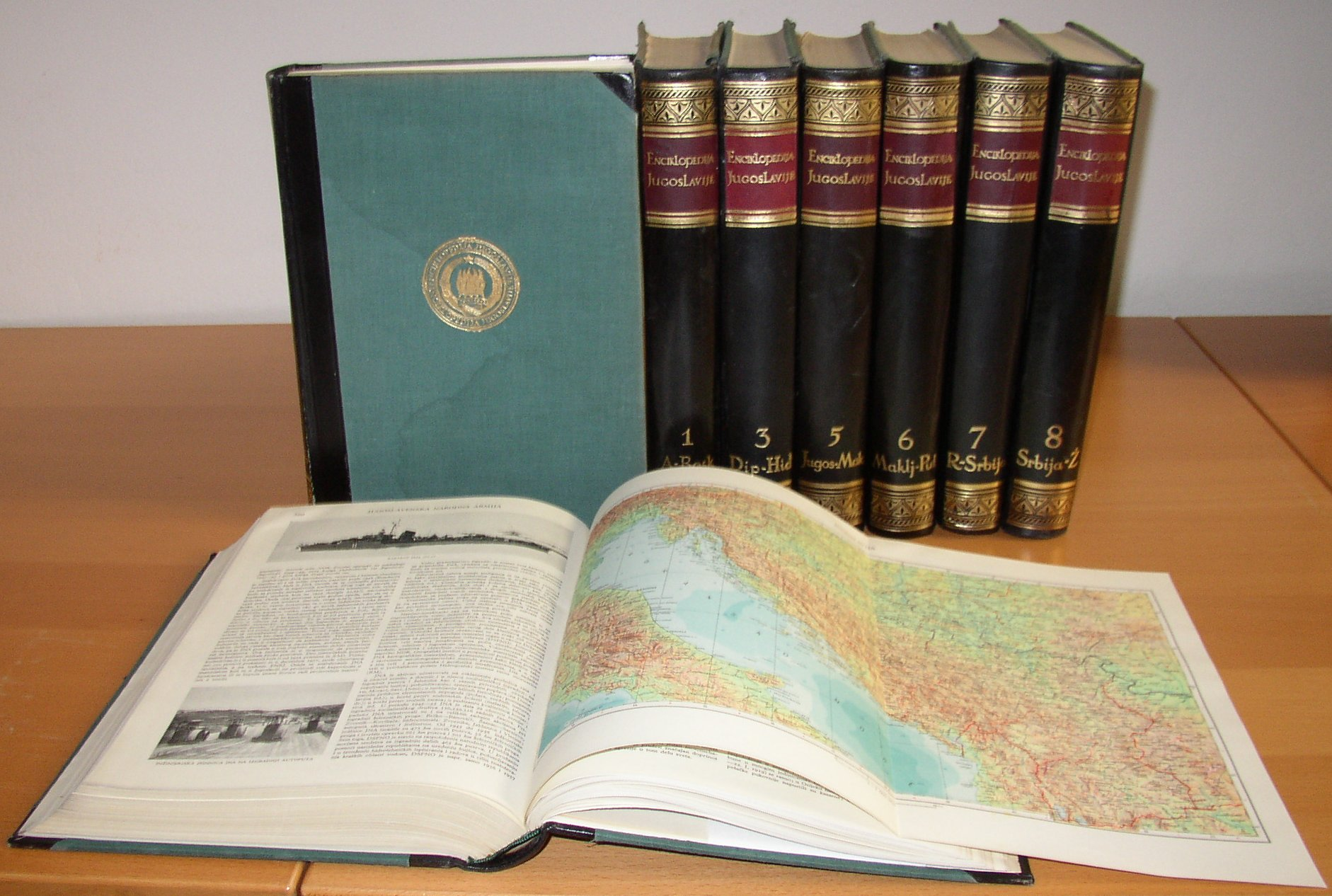
Enciklopedija Jugoslavije, 1st edition

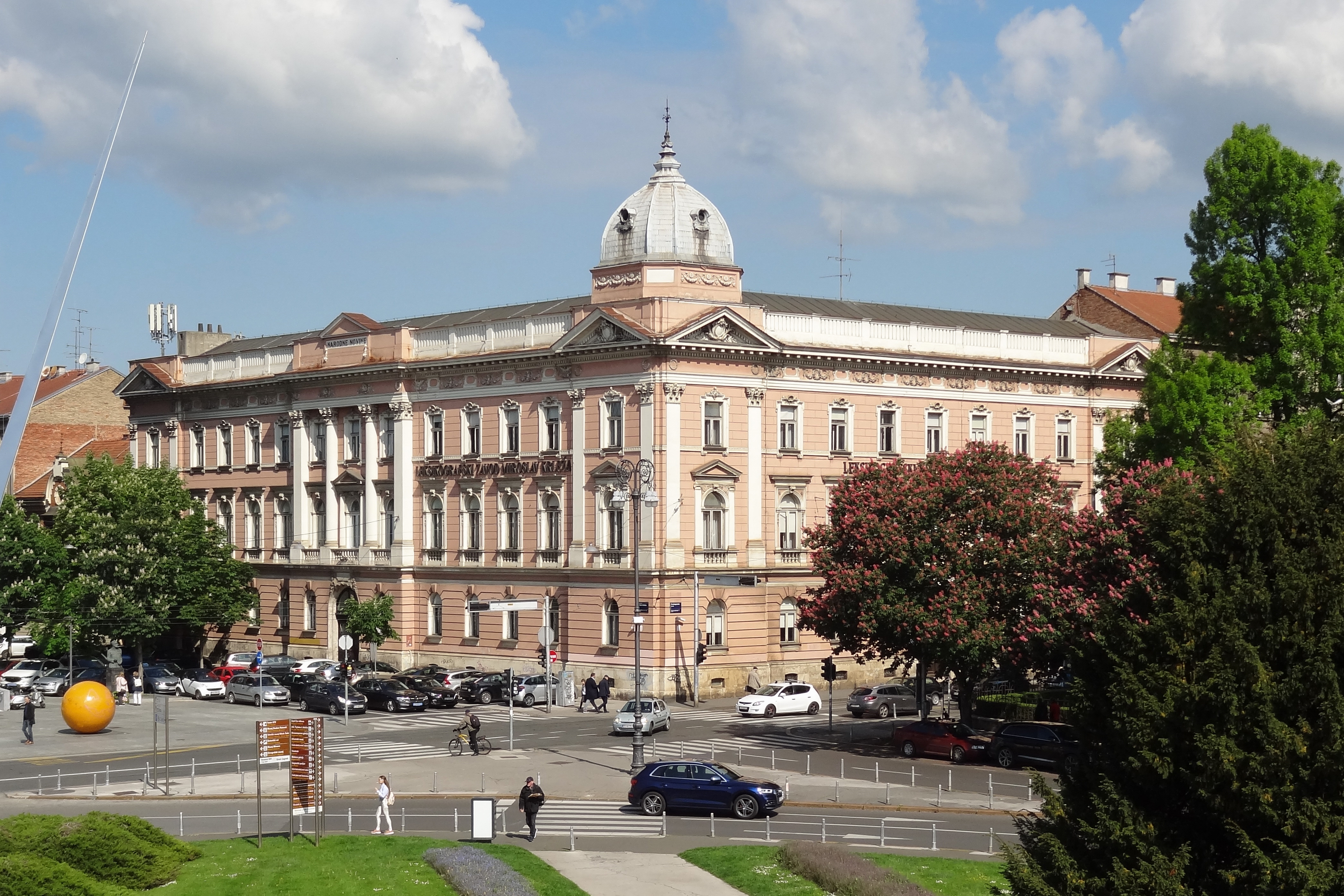
Miroslav Krleža Lexicographical Institute in Zagreb, previously Yugoslav Lexicographical Institute

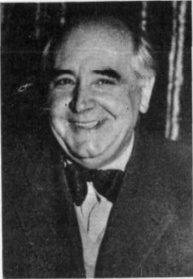
Miroslav Krleža, 1953

==== First Edition ====
Yugoslav and Croatian writer Miroslav Krleža solidified his idea of encyclopaedia during the 1950 Exhibition of Medieval Art of the Yugoslav Peoples in Paris. The exhibition was organized as a part of efforts at cultural opening towards Western Europe following the 1948 Tito–Stalin split and presenting heritage of the "golden age" in the history of the Yugoslav peoples. Krleža perceived the selected historical period as a period in which South Slavic peoples were ″culturally and politically European subjects, independently and even in opposition to "Latin-Byzantine" divisions″. Krleža suggested the initiation of an encyclopaedic publication that would compile and effectively present fundamental information about the Yugoslav peoples. He believed that the encyclopaedia should act as a guiding light, preventing Yugoslav peoples from getting lost in the maze of romantic fantasies. He envisioned it as a tool to shed light on the dark corners of Yugoslav history, helping its readers to understand its past. The encyclopaedia aimed to strike a balance between Yugoslav regional particularisms and broader common interests and scientific truths.

His proposal was embraced, leading to the establishment of the Lexicographic Institute of Federal People's Republic of Yugoslavia in Zagreb by the federal government on October 5, 1950. The first session of the Plenum of the Central Editorial Board was held in Zagreb between January 12th and 14th, 1952. The chief editor of Encyclopedia of Yugoslavia was Miroslav Krleža himself while the assistant chief editor was Mate Ujević. The editorial structure was organized on a federalist principle with six republican and two special editorial offices for military and party related content. President of Yugoslavia Josip Broz Tito praised the work of the Institute and Miroslav Krleža during his visit to Zagreb at the time of completion of the first edition of encyclopaedia.

==== Second Edition ====
Krleža proposed second edition in 1974 while the Federal Committee for Science and Culture accepted the initiative and concluded that the second edition should be a joint effort. The new Social Contract was therefore signed not only by the Yugoslav Lexicographic Institute, but by the federal Assembly of Yugoslavia, republican assemblies of Serbia (including provincial assemblies of Vojvodina and Kosovo separately), Bosnia and Herzegovina, Croatia, Montenegro, Macedonia, Slovenia and explicitly recalling the new 1974 Yugoslav Constitution. During 1975, editorial offices were formed and chief editors were appointed. Alongside the so-called "basic" editions in Croatian literary language and Serbo-Croatian version in two scripts: Latin and Cyrillic, "parallel" editions in Slovenian, Macedonian, Albanian, and Hungarian languages were introduced as well. The program of the second edition also included a special two-volume edition in the English language. First issues of the second edition were published in months following death and state funeral of Josip Broz Tito and caused controversy and criticism in Belgrade newspapers for the alleged mistaken way it addressed Albanian-Yugoslav relations.

==== Breakup of Yugoslavia and cancelation of the publication ====
During the breakup of Yugoslavia and the Croatian War of Independence in early 1990s, Croatian academic Dalibor Brozović, while serving as the principal director of the Lexicographic Institute, directed the disposal and destruction of 40,000 copies of the Encyclopaedia of Yugoslavia. His book destruction actions are interpreted as driven by the prevailing anti-Yugoslav sentiments. The disposal of the Encyclopaedia was interpreted as symbolically representing the erasure of the memory of socialism, Yugoslavia, and the Serbs of Croatia, who previously accounted for approximately 12% of Croatia's population. Between 1990 and 2010, approximately 2.8 million books were systematically removed and destroyed. Nationalist rejection of the publication was not limited to Croatia, Yugoslav republic in which the encyclopedia was published. Following the dissolution of Yugoslavia the Serbian Academy of Sciences and Arts (SANU) particularly targeted the publication, claiming it favoured Croatian interests. Consequently, SANU initiated the idea of a Serbian national encyclopedia, the idea that was not prominent prior to dissolution of the common Yugoslav state. The project was ultimately discontinued in 1991.

== Volumes ==
=== First edition ===
The first edition consists of 8 volumes, issued from 1955 to 1971. It was printed in 30,000 copies.

	Article span	Year of publishing	Number of pages
1	A-Bosk	1955	708
2	Bosna-Dio	1956	716
3	Dip-Hiđ	1958	686
4	Hil-Jugos	1960	651
5	Jugos-Mak	1962	690
6	Maklj-Put	1965	562
7	R-Srbija	1968	688
8	Srbija-Ž	1971	654

=== Second edition ===
Work on the second edition started in 1980, but was not finished due to the Yugoslav wars. Only 6 of 12 planned volumes appeared.

	Article span	Year of publishing	Number of pages
1	A-Biz	1980	767
2	Bje-Crn	1982	776
3	Crn-Đ	1984	750
4	E-Hrv	1986	748
5	Hrv-Janj	1988	776
6	Jap-Kat	1990	731

The main Serbo-Croatian Latin alphabet edition has been translated into 5 additional language-alphabet combinations:

Language / Alphabet	First volume published in	Volumes published
Serbo-Croatian / Cyrillic	1983	2
Slovenian	1983	4
Macedonian	1983	2
Albanian	1984	2
Hungarian	1985	2

The Macedonian and Albanian variants were the first encyclopedias published in the respective languages.

== Critical scholarly reception ==
Lawrence S. Thompson reviewed the work as follows: "The first volume (A-Bosk) of the new Encyclopedia of Yugoslavia deserves attention not only as an important general reference work on Yugoslavia but also for the very extensive attention devoted to libraries, historical bibliography, archives, and other related subjects."

== See also ==
- General Encyclopedia of the Yugoslav Lexicographical Institute
- Croatian Encyclopedia
- Encyclopedia of Slovenia
- Macedonian Encyclopedia
- Great Soviet Encyclopedia
