= Dalibor Brozović =

Croatian linguist and politician (1927–2009)

- Born: 28 July 1927; Sarajevo, Kingdom of Serbs, Croats and Slovenes (modern Bosnia and Herzegovina)
- Died: 19 June 2009 (aged 81); Zagreb, Croatia
- Occupation: Linguist
- Spouse: Nevenka Košutić Brozović
- Relatives: Ranko Matasović (nephew)

Dalibor Brozović (Croatian pronunciation: [dǎlibor brǒːzoʋit͡ɕ]; 28 July 1927 – 19 June 2009) was a Croatian linguist, Slavist, dialectologist and politician. He studied the history of standard languages in the Slavic region, especially Croatian. He was an active Esperantist since 1946, and wrote Esperanto poetry as well as translated works into the language.

== Life and career ==
He was born in Sarajevo and went to primary school in Zenica. Then he went to comprehensive secondary schools in Visoko, Sarajevo and Zagreb. He received a BA degree in the Croatian language and Yugoslav literatures at the Faculty of Humanities and Social Sciences, University of Zagreb. In 1957, he received his Ph.D. with the thesis Speech in the Fojnica Valley.

Brozović worked as an assistant at the Zagreb Theater Academy (1952–1953) and as a lecturer at the University of Ljubljana (until 1956). He subsequently went to the Faculty of Philosophy in Zadar, becoming an associate professor (1956), docent (1958), extraordinary (1962) and full (1968-1990) professor. In 1969 he worked as a visiting professor at the University of Michigan, and since 1971 at the University of Regensburg.

In 1975 he became an associate, and in 1977 extraordinary, and in 1986 full member of the Yugoslav Academy of Sciences and Arts. Since 1986 he was an external member of the Macedonian Academy of Sciences and Arts, and since 1991 of the Academia Europaea.

Since 1946 he was a member of the Communist Party. In the late 1980s, he was a co-founder and vice-president of the Croatian Democratic Union, which would win the 1990 elections. According to Croatian national television documentary “War before war”, he was informer of Yugoslavian secret service (SDS) and operated under code name “Forum” until early 1990. He was the vice-president of the presidency of the Republic of Croatia (in 1990) and a member of the Croatian Parliament (1992-1995). In the period 1991-2001 he headed the Miroslav Krleža Lexicographical Institute. He edited the Atlas of European and Slavic Dialectology. In 2012, Viktor Ivančić identified Brozović as the individual within the institute primarily accountable for directing the disposal and destruction of 40,000 copies of the Encyclopedia of Yugoslavia in the early 1990s.

He was married to art historian Nevenka Košutić Brozović.

== Linguistic importance ==
Brozović has been described as one of the most influential Croatian linguists of the 20th century. However, this view is given from an extremely nationalist perspective, as Brozović was known to often abandon linguistics for an extremely nationalist discourse. Among his main works are the book Standardni jezik ("Standard Language") (1970) and the article "Hrvatski jezik, njegovo mjesto unutar južnoslavenskih i drugih slavenskih jezika, njegove povijesne mijene kao jezika hrvatske književnosti" (Croatian: Its Place among the South Slavic and Other Slavic Languages, Its Historical Changes as the Language of Croatian Literature, 1978). The former gives a typology of standard languages, which however meets criticism for containing disputable and vague criteria. The latter divides the history of Croatian into three pre-standard and three standard periods. Whereas it was widely believed that Croatian was only standardized around the time of the Illyrian movement and Ljudevit Gaj, Brozović argued that the standardization began around 1600 and greatly developed around 1750. However, this Brozović's article also faces criticism due to the fact that "in the 18th century, there was no standard language (’überdachende’ sprachliche Entität), which would roof Kajkavian and Shtokavian". In other words, the major standardization activities took place only in the 19th century.

Brozović was one of the authors of the Declaration on the Status and Name of the Croatian Standard Language, an influential programmatic statement against Yugoslavian linguistic unitarianism from a Croatian nationalist perspective. Two years before Declaration, Brozović denied the existence of Yugoslavian linguistic unitarism: "for Croato-Serbian language as language, as linguistic phenomenon, as language in the Slavic family, there has been no need to unify: it has always been a unity". Retrospectively, west European scientists judge the Yugoslav language policy as an exemplary one. In 2012, Josip Manolić publicly claimed that the secret police of Yugoslavia (UDBA) had one of its agents, code named "Forum", contribute to the Declaration, and journalists linked Brozović to this pseudonym.

Instead of Serbo-Croatian, Brozović preferred the term Central South Slavic diasystem, and that was met with criticism.. However, Brozović advocated the term "Croato-Serbian" even in 1988. As far as language status is concerned, Brozović has asserted for nearly three decades that "the Serbian and Croatian variants are (...) phenomenons, which are analogous to the English and American variants"; "As in other cases where several nations use one standard language (German, Dutch, English, French, Spanish, Portuguese as standard languages), the standard Croato-Serbian language is not unified. In linguistics (especially in sociolinguistics), the realizations of such standard languages are called variants of a standard language". Brozović maintained that it is "a fact that Serbs and Croats have a common language", and he described it as pluricentric even in 1992. In the 1990s, Brozović became one of the leading proponents of linguistic purism in Croatia.

Brozović states that the list of 100 words of the basic Croatian, Serbian, Bosnian, and Montenegrin vocabulary, as set out by Morris Swadesh, shows that all 100 words are identical. According to Swadesh, at least twenty words must differ if they are to be considered as different languages.

Brozović received the Zadar City Award for a prominent scientific activity (for the book Standardni jezik) in the 1970, and an Award for Life's Work of the Republic of Croatia in 1992.

== Works ==
- Rječnik jezika ili jezik rječnika (Dictionary of a Language or a Language of Dictionaries), Zagreb, 1969
- Standardni jezik (Standard Language), Zagreb, 1970
- Deset teza o hrvatskome jeziku (Ten Theses on Croatian), Zagreb, 1971
- Hrvatski jezik, njegovo mjesto unutar južnoslavenskih i drugih slavenskih jezika, njegove povijesne mijene kao jezika hrvatske književnosti (Croatian: Its Place among the South Slavic and Other Slavic Languages, Its Historical Changes as the Language of Croatian Literature), in a book by a collective of authors, Zagreb, 1978
- Fonologija hrvatskoga književnog jezika (Phonology of the Croatian Standard Language) in the book by a collective of authors Povijesni pregled, glasovi i oblici hrvatskoga književnog jezika (Historical Overview, Sounds and Forms of the Croatian Standard Language), Zagreb, 1991
- Prvo lice jednine (First Person Singular: Coll. of previously publ. articles), Zagreb, 2005

== See also ==
- Ausbausprache
- Differences between Serbo-Croatian standard varieties
- Language secessionism in Serbo-Croatian
- Mutual intelligibility
- Pluricentric Serbo-Croatian language
- Serbo-Croatian language
- South Slavic dialect continuum
- South Slavic languages
- Standard language
