= Alvin Saunders Johnson =

American economist

Alvin S. Johnson
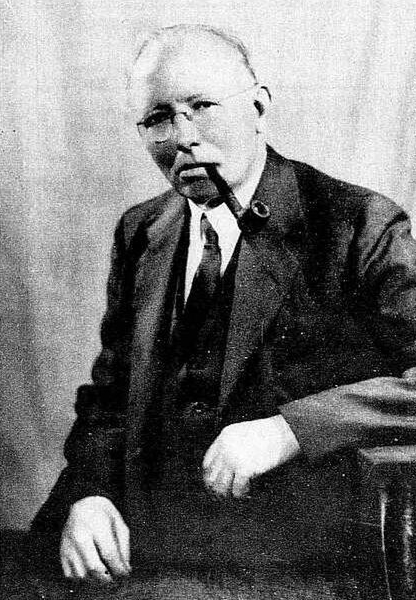
- Johnson c. 1937
- Born: December 18, 1874; Homer, Nebraska, U.S.
- Died: June 7, 1971 (aged 96); Upper Nyack, New York, U.S.

Academic background
- Education: University of Nebraska; Columbia University
- Doctoral advisor: Edwin R. A. Seligman; John Bates Clark

Academic work
- Institutions: Cornell University
- Doctoral students: Frank H. Knight

Alvin Saunders Johnson (December 18, 1874 – June 7, 1971) was an American economist and a co-founder and first director of The New School.

== Biography ==
Alvin Johnson was born near Homer, Nebraska. He was educated at the University of Nebraska and Columbia (Ph.D., 1902). Afterwards, he was employed in various positions at Columbia, the University of Nebraska, the University of Texas, the University of Chicago, Stanford, and at Cornell after 1913.

He was assistant editor of the Political Science Quarterly in 1902–06, and editor from 1917 of the New Republic in New York City.

He was a co-founder of The New School in New York in 1918, becoming its director in 1922. Johnson helped to save numerous central European scholars from persecution by the Nazis in the 1930s and 1940s, then brought them to a specially-created division of the New School which became known as the "University in Exile". There, among others, he worked with the antifascist, anti-Communist intellectual Max Ascoli. He was also an editor of the massive Encyclopaedia of the Social Sciences. He was elected to the American Philosophical Society in 1942.

He officially retired in December 1945, and died in 1971 in Upper Nyack, New York.

== Major publications ==
- Rent in Modern Economic Theory: An Essay in Distribution, 1903.
- Introduction to Economics, 1909.
- "Review of Hobson's Industrial System", 1911, AER.
- "Review of Hobson's Science of Wealth", 1912, AER.
- "Review of Böhm-Bawerk's Positive Theory of Capital", 1914, AER.
- "Review of Adler's Kapitalzins und Preisbewegung", 1914, AER.
- War and the Interests of Labor, 1914.
- Commerce and War, 1914.
- The Professor and the Petticoat, 1914 (novel).
- "Review of Carver's Essays in Social Justice and Hollander's Abolition of Poverty", 1916, AER
- John Stuyvesant, Ancestor, 1919.
- Editor, Encyclopaedia of the Social Sciences, 1930.
- "The Rising Tide of Anti-Semitism", 1939, Survey Graphic
- The Clock of History, 1946.
- Socialism in Western Europe, 1948.
- Pioneer's Progress: An autobiography, 1952.
- Essays in Social Economics, 1954.
- New World for Old: A Family Migration, 1965
- Introduction to Economics, 1971.

== Legacy ==
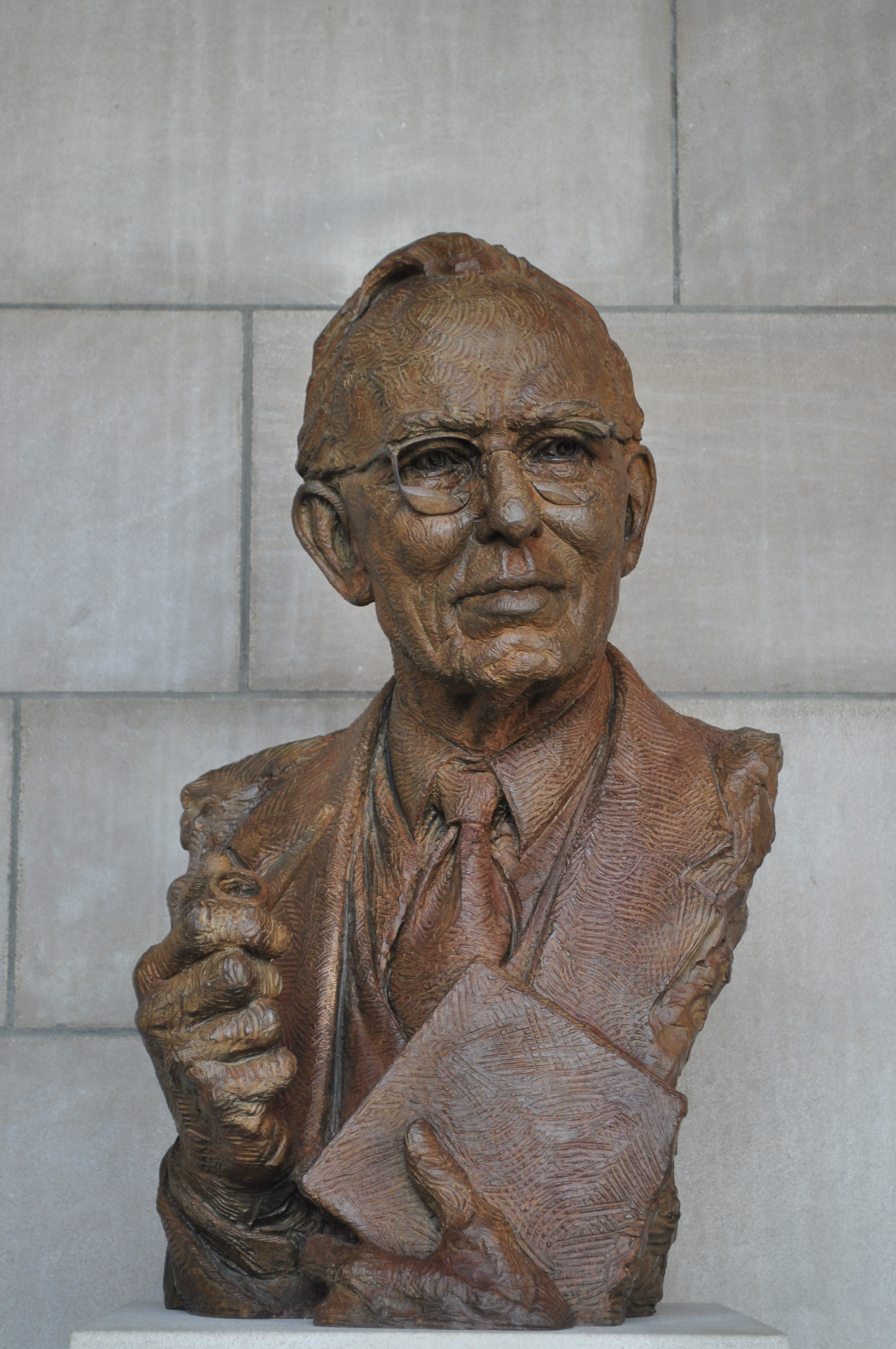
Bust of Alvin Saunders Johnson created by Wesley Wofford in 2014 for the Nebraska Hall of Fame.

He was inducted into the Nebraska Hall of Fame in 2012.

== Literature ==
- Peter M. Rutkoff, William B. Scott: New School: a History of the New School for Social Research. New York: Free Press 1986.
- Claus-Dieter Krohn: Wissenschaft im Exil. Deutsche Sozial- und Wirtschaftswissenschaftler in den USA und die New School for Social Research, Frankfurt a.M. Campus 1987.
- Autobiography, Pioneer's Progress, published in 1952
