= Encyclopedia of Christianity =

- Author: John Stephen Bowden
- Language: English
- Subject: Christianity
- Publisher: Oxford University Press
- Publication date: August 2005
- Publication place: United Kingdom
- Media type: Print
- Pages: 1364
- ISBN: 0195223934
- OCLC: 60359641
- Dewey Decimal: 230.003
- LC Class: BR95 .E47 2005

The Encyclopedia of Christianity is a one-volume encyclopedia published by Oxford University Press and edited by John Bowden of the University of Nottingham and King's College, London. It contains over three hundred articles on a variety of Christian topics and themes. Some of the authors include professor John Barton from Oxford University, Cynthia B. Cohen from Georgetown University and Martin Marty from the University of Chicago. It contains twenty one colour pictures and ninety six black and white illustrations.

In his introduction Bowden noted that most Christians have only a limited understanding of the traditions of their own religion. The Christian Century called the encyclopedia "a major scholarly achievement" but noted that it relied entirely on scholars from Europe and North America. Religion writer Richard Ostling called this book, together with its companion release, the Oxford Dictionary of the Christian Church (3rd ed.), "2005's books of the year in religion", and commented that the Encyclopedia takes a "relatively moderate approach to literary and historical disputes." Publishers Weekly said: "Overall, this encyclopedia is a must-have for any Christian reference shelf."

== See also ==
- List of encyclopedias by branch of knowledge § Christianity
