= William A. Darity Jr. =

American economist (born 1953)

Sandy Darity
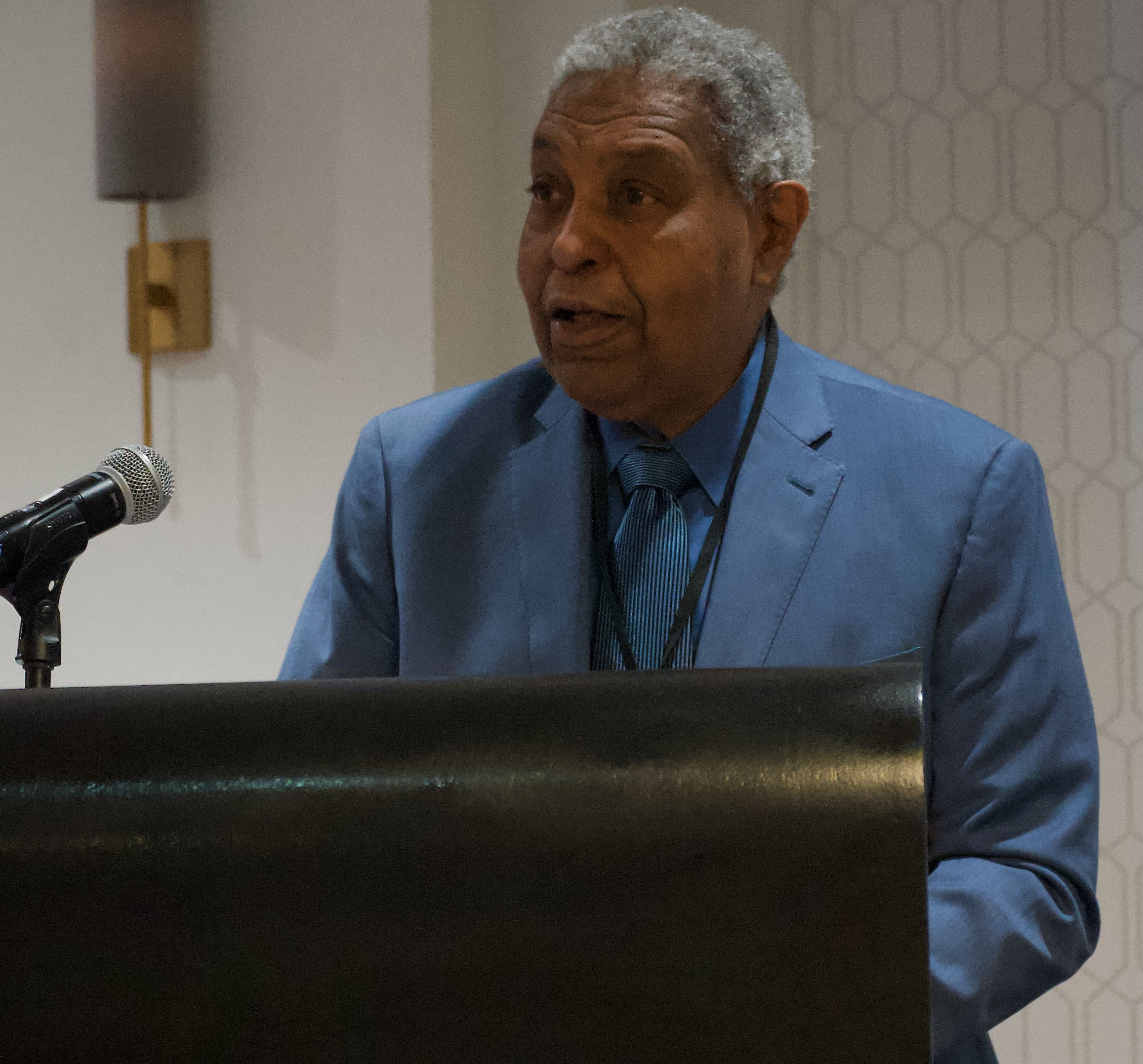
- Darity speaking at 2025 Samuel Westerfield Award
- Born: April 19, 1953 (age 73); Norfolk, Virginia, U.S.

Academic background
- Education: Brown University (BA); London School of Economics; Massachusetts Institute of Technology (MA, PhD)

Academic work
- Discipline: Macroeconomics; Public economics Economic stratification analysis
- Institutions: University of North Carolina, Chapel Hill; Duke University
- Awards: Marshall Scholar (1974)

William A. "Sandy" Darity Jr. (born April 19, 1953) is an American economist and social scientist at Howard University. Darity's research spans economic history, development economics, economic psychology, and the history of economic thought, but most of his research is devoted to group-based inequality, especially with respect to race and ethnicity. His 2005 paper in the Journal of Economics and Finance established Darity as the "founder of stratification economics." His research interests have also included the trans-Atlantic slave trade, African American reparations and the economics of black reparations, and social and economic policies that affect inequities by race and ethnicity. He has been described as "perhaps the country’s leading scholar on the economics of racial inequality."

He is the Samuel DuBois Cook Professor Emeritus of Public Policy, African and African American Studies, and Economics at Duke University; he is also a visiting professor at Howard University and the director of the Samuel DuBois Cook Center. Previously he was the Cary C. Boshamer Professor of Economics and Sociology at the University of North Carolina.

== Early life, education ==
Darity was born in Norfolk, Virginia, and spent time in his childhood in Beirut, Lebanon; Alexandria, Egypt; and Chapel Hill, North Carolina. His adolescent years were spent primarily in Amherst, Massachusetts. His parents were William A. Darity Sr., a long-time faculty member and the founding Dean of the School of Public Health at the University of Massachusetts at Amherst, and Evangeline Royal Darity, a faculty member and administrator at Smith College and Mt. Holyoke College. He has one sibling, Janiki Evangelia Darity, who works as an attorney.

Darity Jr. graduated magna cum laude with a bachelor's degree from Brown University in 1974, where he earned honors in economics and political science. He was named a Marshall Scholar after undergraduate school, and on the scholarship spent one year studying at the London School of Economics and Political Science. In 1978 he completed a doctorate in economics at the Massachusetts Institute of Technology.

== Academic career ==
In 1980, Darity became a staff economist in the research department of the National Urban League. He began as a professor at the University of North Carolina at Chapel Hill in 1983. He was then a visiting scholar at the Federal Reserve's Board of Governors in 1984.

Darity has served as a director or on the board of a number of organizations. From 1989 to 1990 he was a fellow at the National Humanities Center. He became a member of the American Economic Association's executive committee from 1993 to 1996, and in 1997 he was President of the Southern Economic Association. He is also a former president of the National Economic Association.

He has served as a professor at Grinnell College, the University of Maryland at College Park, the University of Texas at Austin, Simmons College in Boston, and Claremont McKenna College. From 2003 to 2005 he was a William and Camille Cosby Endowed Professor at Spelman College. He has also either taught or served as a fellow at London School of Economics and Political Science, the University of Tulsa, and the Centro de Excelencia Empresarial (Monterey, Mexico).

Darity was awarded the 2012 Westerfield Award from the National Economic Association, their highest honor. Previous recipients include Nobel Laureate Sir W. Arthur Lewis, Phyllis Ann Wallace and Marcus Alexis. He was named a Fellow of the National Academy of Social Insurance in 2021 and the W.E.B. Du Bois Fellow of the American Academy of Political and Social Science in 2022. He was also a 2023 Distinguished Fellow of the Southern Economic Association and a 2024 Distinguished Fellow of the American Economic Association. In 2024 Darity received the William Spriggs Memorial Award from the Association for Public Policy Analysis and Management.

=== University of North Carolina ===
After joining the staff in 1983, Darity became the Cary C. Bohamer Professor of Economics and Sociology at the University of North Carolina. He taught economics and was a research professor of public policy, African and African-American studies, and economics. He directed the economics department's undergraduate honors and graduate studies programs. In 2001 he was appointed as director of UNC's Institute of African American Research.

=== Duke University ===
From 2014 until his retirement from the school in 2025, Darity was a distinguished professor at Duke University. As of 2026, Darity is the Samuel DuBois Cook Distinguished Professor Emeritus of Public Policy, African and African American Studies, and Economics at Duke University. He is the founding director of the Samuel DuBois Cook Center on Social Equity (established 2015), now the Samuel DuBois Cook Center.

== Publications ==
Darity has published more than 250 articles in professional journals, including the American Economic Review, the Journal of Economic Perspectives, the Journal of Economic Literature, The Review of Black Political Economy, the Journal of Economic Behavior and Organization, the American Sociological Review, the Journal of Socio-Economics, and the Journal of Human Resources. His research has also been featured on National Public Radio and PBS. He has made editorial contributions to news outlets including the New York Times, the Washington Post, the Philadelphia Inquirer, the Philadelphia Tribune, the Boston Globe, Bloomberg News, the Los Angeles Times, and Black Star News. In 2008, Darity was editor-in-chief of the International Encyclopedia of the Social Sciences.

== Research ==
=== Focus ===
A central organizing theme of Darity's work has been exploration of multiple aspects of economic inequality, including colorism, discrimination in the labor market and "marriage market" outcomes, parallels between caste inequality in India and racial inequality in the United States, ethnic diversity and conflict, the social psychological effects of exposure to unemployment, and schooling and the racial achievement gap. At the international level, Darity has studied financial crises in developing countries, North-South theories of development and trade, and the relationship between the Trans-Atlantic slave trade and the Industrial Revolution. He also has examined the relationship between research in the social sciences on race and racism and African American fictional literature and film.

Darity has published extensively on racial economic inequality, wealth disparities, and reparations. His 2020 book "From Here to Equality: Reparations for Black Americans in the Twenty-First Century," co-authored with A. Kirsten Mullen, presents a comprehensive case for reparations for descendants of enslaved people in the United States.

==== Stratification economics ====
Darity coined the term "stratification economics" in 2005, establishing a subfield that insights from economics, sociology, and social psychology to explain persistent group-based economic disparities.

Darity's work draws from diverse intellectual traditions, including Veblenian evolutionary economics, Du Bois's historical empiricism, and social identity theory to create a comprehensive framework for understanding group inequality. Darity's contributions synthesize these perspectives to argue that the maintenance of social hierarchies serves the material interests of dominant groups. His work emphasizes that discrimination is not merely a market imperfection but a strategic behavior that preserves advantageous positions. This theoretical foundation has economic and policy implications, as Darity argues that addressing human capital disparities alone is insufficient, and challenges neoclassical economic theories that view discrimination as irrational market behavior. Darity's economic research suggests that dominant groups rationally maintain economic hierarchies through collective action and institutional mechanisms, and that broad public interventions and identity-conscious policies are needed to disrupt entrenched patterns of stratification.

=== Notable studies ===
==== Discrimination in employment ====
With Samuel Myers Jr., Darity conducted a series of studies on the statistical measurement of discrimination in labor markets. In 1998, he published his most cited paper with Patrick Mason in the Journal of Economic Perspective in which the authors advanced a detailed critique of the two dominant theoretical approaches to discrimination in economics, the taste and the statistical models. His research with Arthur Goldsmith on the psycho-emotional impact of joblessness led to a companion study demonstrating that taking into account motivation more than offset the negative impact on estimates of discrimination from inclusion of measures of Armed Forces Qualification Test Scores in the analysis. With Major Coleman and Rhonda Sharpe, Darity was a member of a team that found in a paper published in the American Journal of Economics and Sociology in 2008 that white workers tend to grossly over-report their exposure to discrimination in the workplace, while black workers tend to grossly under-report their exposure to discrimination in the workplace.

==== Baby bonds program ====
With economist Darrick Hamilton, Darity has proposed a federal asset building program aimed at remediating the racial wealth gap. Popularly labeled "baby bonds," the program calls for the issuance of a publicly funded trust account for each newborn child accessible when the child reaches young adulthood. The amount of the trust account is to be calibrated on the basis of the child's family's wealth position.

==== Job guarantee ====
A long-time advocate of a federal job guarantee, in 2012, in response to the protracted economic crisis produced by the Great Recession, Darity called for establishment of the National Investment Employment Corps, assuring all U.S. citizens over the age of 18 employed work at a salary above the poverty line as well as the standard benefits package for all civil servants, including medical coverage and retirement savings.

==== Reparations ====
In 2003, Darity published a paper coauthored with Dania Frank Francis in the proceedings of the American Economic Association called “The Economics of Reparations.” Subsequently, in 2008, he published the article “Forty Acres and a Mule in the Twenty-First Century” in Social Science Quarterly. In 2020, with A. Kirsten Mullen, he published From Here to Equality: Reparations for Black Americans in the Twenty-First Century, a book that synthesized and extended his previous work on the topic.

Darity argues that recipients must be black Americans whose ancestors were enslaved in the United States, the monetary target must be sufficient funds to eliminate black-white differences in average wealth, the federal government must execute the program, and the major form of outlays must be direct payments to eligible recipients.

== Partial publication history ==
- Labor Economics: Problems in Analyzing Labor Markets (1992, editor)
- Macroeconomics (1994, co-author)
- Persistent Disparity: Race and Economic inequality in the United States since 1945 (1999, co-author)
- Boundaries of Clan and Color: Transnational Comparisons of Inter-Group Disparity (2003, co-editor)
- Economics, Economists, and Expectations: Microfoundations to Macroapplications (2004, co-author)
- International Encyclopedia of the Social Sciences (2007, editor-in-chief)
- For-Profit Universities: The Shifting Landscape of Marketized Higher Education (2017, editor)
- From Here to Equality: Reparations for Black Americans in the Twentieth Century (2020, co-author)
- The Black Reparations Project: A Handbook for Racial Justice (2023, co-editor)
