= A Military Encyclopedia =

A Military Encyclopedia or Farrow's Military Encyclopedia is an American encyclopedia published in New York in 1885. The contents of A Military Encyclopedia are now in the public domain.

- Vol.I. (Abaca to Gyves); 821 pages, 500+ illus. plus 37 plates of illustration
- Vol.II (Habeas Corpus to Ryswick); 832 pages, 500+ illus. plus 25 plates of illustrations
- Vol.III (Sabander to Zundnadelgewerr); 668 pages, 500+ illus. plus 26 plates of illustrations
