= Eerste Nederlandse Pop Encyclopedie =

Dutch pop music encyclopedia

The Eerste Nederlandse Pop Encyclopedie ('First Dutch Pop Encyclopedia') is a Dutch encyclopedia on pop music, published by the Dutch pop music magazine Muziekkrant Oor since 1977, with a new edition coming out roughly every two years. Over the years, the size hasn't increased. Consequently, the articles on some bands have been shortened or even completely removed. Therefore, older editions are still valuable as a reference for such bands and are indeed referred to in the newer editions.
