= Perelman's Pocket Cyclopedia of Cigars =

Two editions of the Cyclopedia of Cigars, (2006 and 2007).

The Perelman's Pocket Cyclopedia of Cigars is an annually published and updated reference of cigar brands available in the United States, including specifications and information regarding each cigar, as well as basic cigar knowledge in general, such as wrapper colours and shapes and sizes. There is also an 'Almanac' section which includes a list of new brands and those that have been discontinued since the last edition, details about 'ancient' brands that are still in production, a list of unusual cigars (with multicolored wrappers, for example), a list of the smallest and largest cigars available (by length and ring gauge), and more.

== Editions ==
It was first published in 1995 and contained 370 brands. The number of brands covered jumped to 659 in the 1997 edition, then to 1,144 in 1998, and then to an all-time high of 1,448 in 1999. The 15th edition (2009) has the second highest brand total ever and includes information on 1,360 brands (1,209 handmade, 75 machine made and 76 small cigars/cigarillos).

=== Cyclopedia of Havana Cigars ===
There is a companion edition, the Perelman's Pocket Cyclopedia of Havana Cigars which is similar, but includes information solely on the Cuban cigar brands. It is currently in its third edition (published 2005), but is not published every year (the 2nd edition was in 1998), and also includes information about how cigars are made in Cuba, a history of tobacco and Cuban brands, and details on vitolas.

Both editions are written by Richard B. Perelman.

== References/External links ==
- Richard B. Perelman, Perelman's Pocket Cyclopedia of Cigars (2007), ISBN 1-893273-08-3
- Richard B. Perelman, Perelman's Pocket Cyclopedia of Havana Cigars, Third edition (2005), ISBN 1-893273-06-7
- Official Site
