= Atlas of the Prehistoric World =

1999 book by Douglas Palmer

- Author: Douglas Palmer
- Language: English
- Genre: Reference encyclopedia
- Publisher: Random House, Inc.
- Publication date: 1999
- Pages: 224 pp
- ISBN: 978-1-56331-829-0
- OCLC: 54844120
- Dewey Decimal: 912 21
- LC Class: G1046.C57 P3 1999

Atlas of the Prehistoric World is a book written by Douglas Palmer. It was published in 1999 by Random House, Inc. It covers the last 620 million years.
