= Healthline =

American health information company

Healthline Media
- Company type: Subsidiary
- Founded: 1999; 27 years ago (as YourDoctor.com)
- Headquarters: San Francisco, California & New York, New York, United States
- Owner: Healthline Media (RVO Health)
- Products: Health information services
- Employees: 279 (2018)
- Website: www.healthline.com

Healthline Media, Inc. is an American website and provider of health information headquartered in San Francisco, California. It was founded in 1999, and purchased by Red Ventures in 2019. Healthline claimed to be using AI to generate content from 2023–2026, although that claim has now been reversed.

== Description ==
Healthline Media runs healthline.com, which publishes health and wellness information. It also has provided health content to third party websites. In 2010, Healthline Media signed an agreement to provide medical and health-related content to Yahoo! Health. Other partners have included AARP.com, The Dr. Oz Show web site, and insurance company Aetna.

== Reception ==
There are questions about the quality and neutrality of their content. For example, the site Health News Review said a Healthline article about a new medication used promotional language copied from the drug-maker's press release, neglected to cite side effects, and framed the drug's claimed benefits in misleading language that failed to accurately reflect the evidence in a peer-reviewed medical journal. Another news reviewer noted that an article on depression cited studies that had not been peer-reviewed, but provided "multiple perspectives from both within and outside the research articles" without exaggeration.

In a study using coverage of neck pain to evaluate a tool designed to review health websites, researchers from the University of Brighton gave Healthline a score of "good". In particular, the website received high marks in areas such as accuracy, readability, disclosure of sources and ownership, and usability, with lower scores in areas such as comprehensiveness and accessibility.

Healthline's quality has been assessed as falling towards the middle of health information websites. A study of top-ranking health websites published in 2021 evaluated its quality as "good", lower than MedlinePlus's "excellent" scores but higher than affiliate Medical News Today's "fair/good" ranking. Healthline is included on Wikipedia's spam blacklist due to its publication of misinformation.

While some writers have used terms like "reliable" to describe Healthline, others have questioned both the quality of its content and its usability and readability. A 2020 study of readability ranked Healthline the second hardest to read (highest education level required) among the top five Google search results for "phenylketonuria", excluding Wikipedia.

In 2024, Healthline was criticized by the Wikipedia community due to its publication of misinformation.

== History ==
Healthline Media was founded in 1999 by endocrine specialist James Norman as YourDoctor.com. In 2006, the company re-launched as Healthline Networks.

In 2011, Healthline was reported to be losing money because it was licensing its content from others. The company invested $1 million to develop its own content. By 2013, it had over $21 million in revenue and 105 employees, with offices in New York City and San Francisco. Deloitte ranked Healthline Media as one of the top 500 fastest-growing technology companies in North America from 2010 to 2013.

In January 2016, Healthline raised $95 million in growth equity financing through Summit Partners. Under the terms of the agreement, Healthline's media business was established as a standalone entity with David Kopp as CEO. The firm acquired the health news website Medical News Today and reference website MediLexicon in May 2016.

In July 2019, Healthline was acquired by Red Ventures. In August 2020, Healthline acquired Psych Central.
