= Encyclopaedia of Shia =

- Editor: Ahmad Seyed Javadi
- Author: Various scholars
- Original title: دانشنامه تشیع
- Language: Persian
- Subject: Shia Islam, Islamic studies
- Genre: Reference work
- Publisher: The Taher Foundation
- Publication date: 1981–2011
- Publication place: Iran
- Media type: Print, Online
- Pages: 14 volumes

Encyclopedia of Shi'a (Persian: دانشنامه تشیع) is an encyclopedia on Shia studies that was published in 14 volumes between 1981 and 2011. The editor-in-chief is Ahmad Seyed Javadi. The writing of this encyclopedia started in 1981 with the sponsorship of The Taher Foundation and was followed by the sponsorship of Fahime Mohebbi.

== See also ==
- Umdat al-Talib
