= Peter Rutkoff =

American academic

Peter Rutkoff is a retired academic who was a Professor of American Studies at Kenyon College and director of the Kenyon Academic Partnership.

He grew up in New York City and attended Ethical Culture Fieldston School. He received his bachelor's degree at St. Lawrence University in 1964, and went on to attend the University of Pennsylvania for his M.A. and Ph.D.

With William Scott, a Kenyon colleague, he ran a humanities seminar on the migration of African Americans from the South to the North. They developed a classroom project which examines this Great Migration. Students and faculty traveled to cities to study the impact of the migration. His course has attracted much grant support and is entitled “North by South: The Great African-American Migration, 1900-1960.” It includes two-week-long field trips where students research archives, documents, and oral-history interviews in two different cities, one from the north and one from the south. The pairing of two cities, such as Memphis, Tennessee, and Chicago, Illinois, and Birmingham, Alabama, and Pittsburgh, Pennsylvania, studies true migration patterns of southern African Americans to the north. He and Scott discovered their own connections while researching for books on the arts scene in New York City. They wanted to allow the students to find their own connections.

Dr. Rutkoff helped to create the college’s interdisciplinary American studies program in 1990. He also directs the Kenyon Academic Partnership, in which talented high-school students are given courses arranged by high-school teachers and college professors to challenge them. He was the 1993 Professor of the Year State Winner for Ohio.

He retired from teaching in May 2021.

== Publications ==
His books cover subjects such as the origins of Bebop, styles of baseball, and social theory in Europe and America. Some of his titles include:

- New York Modern: The Arts and the City,
- Shadow Ball: A Novel of Baseball and Chicago, and
- Cooperstown Chronicles: Camp and Other Love Stories.
