= The New Encyclopedia of Snakes =

1995 encyclopedia by Chris Mattison

- Author: Chris Mattison
- Subject: Snakes
- Genre: Encyclopedia
- Publication date: 2007
- ISBN: 9780691132952

The New Encyclopedia of Snakes is an encyclopedia by Chris Mattison.

== Book summary ==
The encyclopedia has information about snakes that is listed from A-Z. The book has pictures and information about snake morphology, habitats, diets, hunting and defense behaviors, taxonomy, and a history of human responses to snakes.

== Reception ==
It was reviewed by Science Activities, Washington Times, Booklist, King Features Syndicate, Wildlife Activist, Dover Post, Choice, and Science Books and Fun.
