= Children's Illustrated Encyclopedia =

The Children's Illustrated Encyclopedia is an encyclopedia marketed for use by children ages 7-17. The single-volume work emphasizes visuals like illustrations, photographs, maps, and timelines over breadth of coverage, and entries are supplemented by an official website and URLs to third party resources. It is in its seventh edition, published since 2010 by Dorling Kindersley. It was shortlisted for a 2001 Blue Peter Book Award in the "Best Book of Knowledge" category.
