= Encyclopedia of Slovenia =

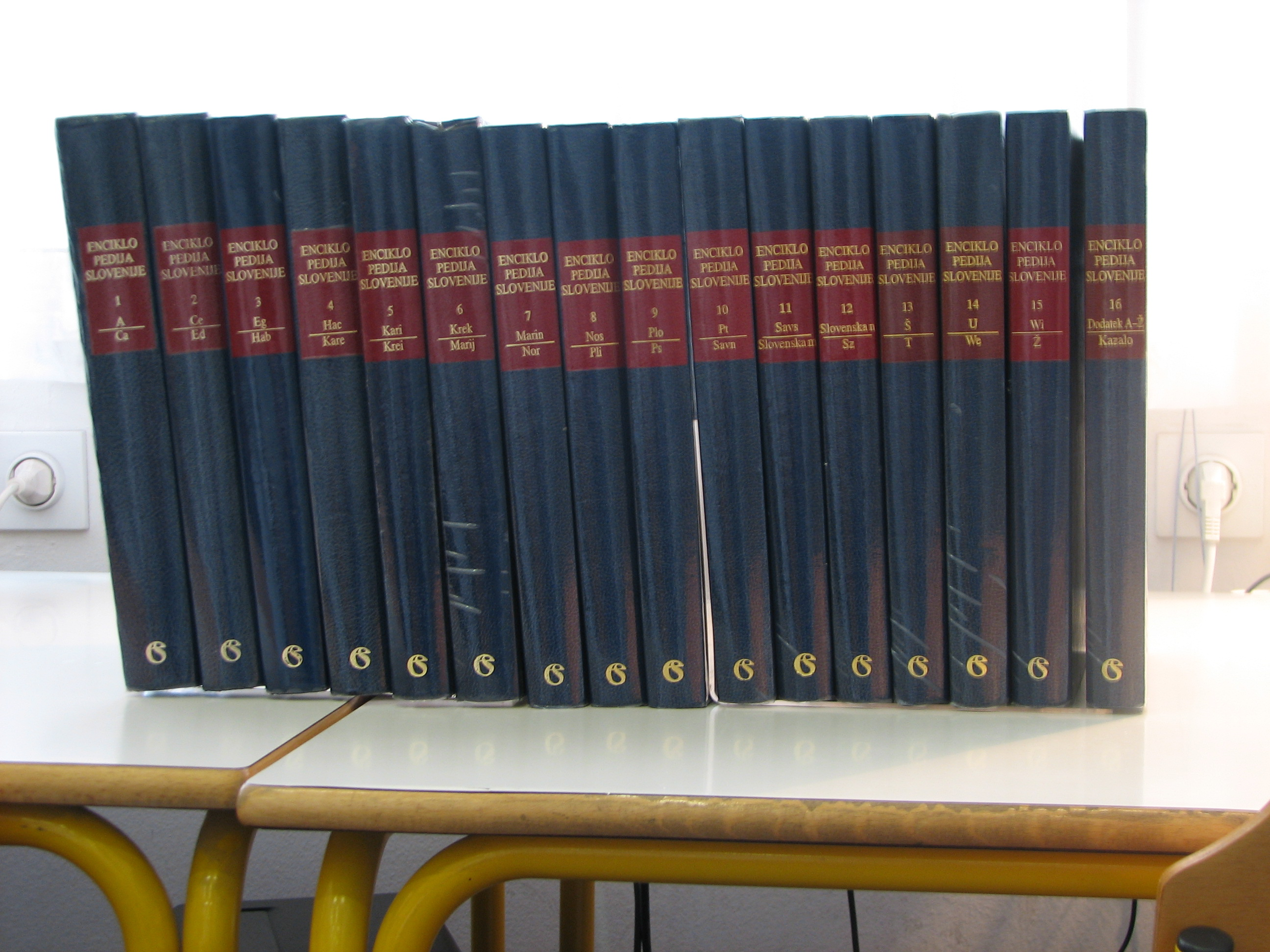
All books of the Encyclopedia of Slovenia

The Encyclopedia of Slovenia (Slovene: Enciklopedija Slovenije) is a Slovene-language encyclopedia that contains topics related to Slovenia. It was published from 1987 to 2002 in 16 volumes by Mladinska knjiga in cooperation with the Slovenian Academy of Sciences and Arts.

The editors of the encyclopedia were Marjan Javornik, Dušan Voglar, and Alenka Dermastia, and the editors of special topics were Rajko Pavlovec, Blaž Resman, Janez Stergar, Zdravko Mlinar, Peter Weiss, Tone Wraber, Aleš Krbavčič, and Tone Ferenc.

The first volumes were published in a print run of 30,000, but the print run was reduced to 15,000 for later volumes.

For its overall work on the Encyclopedia of Slovenia, the publisher Mladinska knjiga received the Golden Order of Freedom of the Republic of Slovenia, the highest-ranking order awarded in Slovenia.

== Volumes ==
1. A–Ca, 1987, xvii + 421 pages, 30,000 copies OCLC 468393318
2. Ce–Ed, 1988, xv + 416 pages, 31,000 copies OCLC 468393751
3. Eg–Hab, 1989, xv + 416 pages, 30,000 copies OCLC 30503348
4. Hac–Kare, 1990, xvii + 416 pages, 30,000 copies OCLC 30503372
5. Kari–Krei, 1991, xv + 416 pages, 22,000 copies OCLC 30503396
6. Krek–Marij, 1992, xv + 416 pages, 20,000 copies OCLC 30503416
7. Marin–Nor, 1993, xv + 416 pages, 20,000 copies OCLC 30503437
8. Nos–Pli, 1994, xvi + 416 pages, 20,000 copies ISBN 86-11-14269-1 OCLC 31899592
9. Plo–Ps, 1995, xv + 416 pages, 20,000 copies ISBN 86-11-14345-0 OCLC 35562591
10. Pt–Savn, 1996, xv + 416 pages, 20,000 copies ISBN 86-11-14792-8 OCLC 36885531
11. Savs–Slovenska m, 1997, xv + 416 pages, 18,000 copies ISBN 86-11-15070-8 OCLC 38307492
12. Slovenska n–Sz, 1998, xv + 416 pages, 18,000 copies ISBN 86-11-15344-8 OCLC 40744878
13. Š–T, 1999, xv + 416 pages, 18,000 copies ISBN 86-11-15364-2 OCLC 43527563
14. U–We, 2000, xv + 416 pages, 15,000 copies ISBN 86-11-15365-0 OCLC 46364197
15. Wi–Ž and Chronological Overview, 2001, xv + 416 pages, 15,000 copies ISBN 86-11-15366-9 OCLC 163647109
16. Additions A–Ž and Index, 2002, xv + 416 pages, 15,000 copies ISBN 86-11-15367-7 OCLC 159872812

== See also ==
- Encyclopedia of Yugoslavia
