= Miroslav Krleža Institute of Lexicography =

Croatia's national lexicographical institution

Coordinates: 45°48′38″N 15°58′08″E

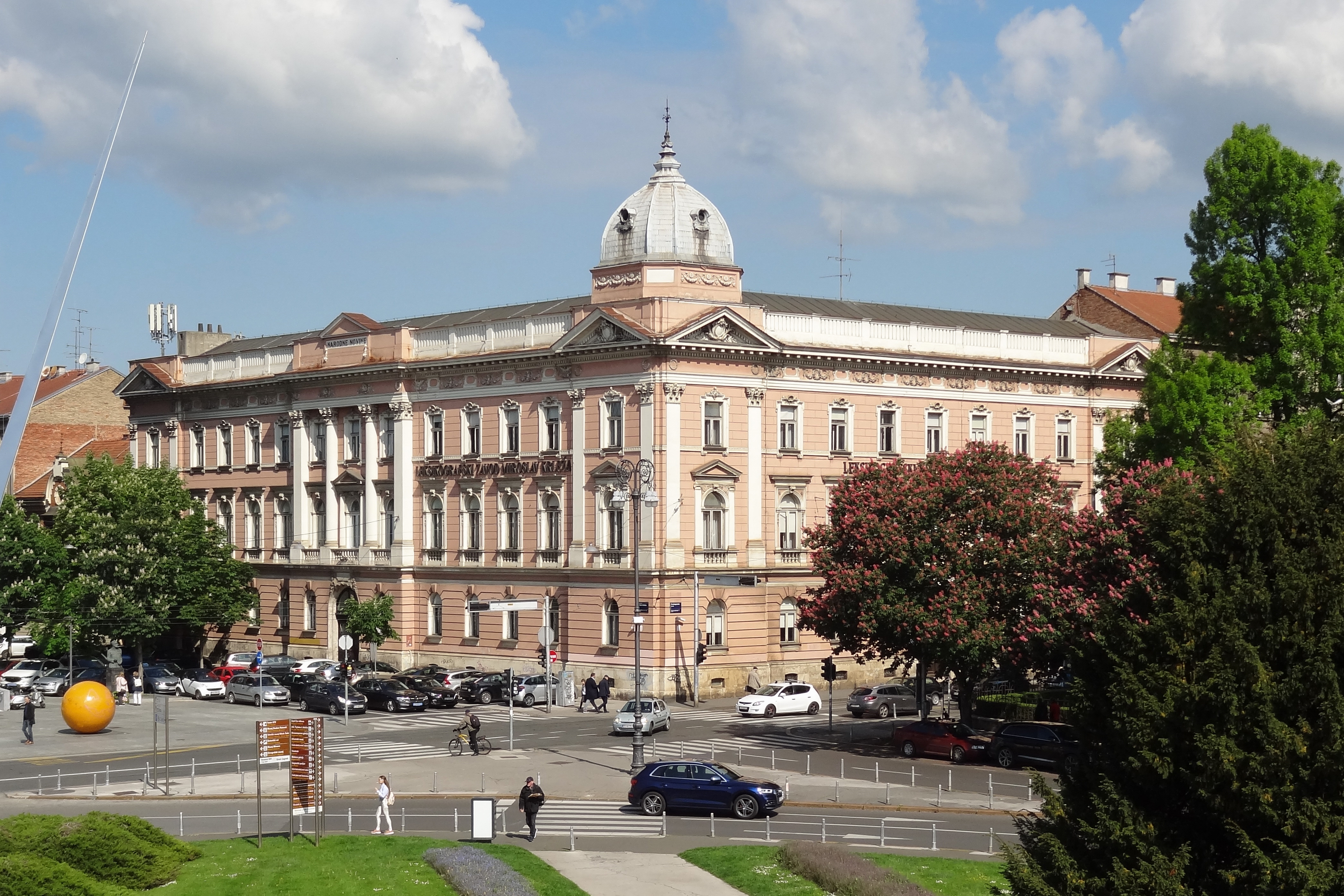
- The institute's building viewed from Republic of Croatia Square in Zagreb
- Established: 1950
- Formerly called: Lexicographical Institute of the Federal People's Republic of Yugoslavia (1950–1962); Yugoslav Lexicographical Institute (1962–1991)
- Address: Frankopanska Ulica 26
- Location: Zagreb, Croatia
- Interactive map of Miroslav Krleža Institute of Lexicography
- Website: http://www.lzmk.hr/

Logo of the Institute

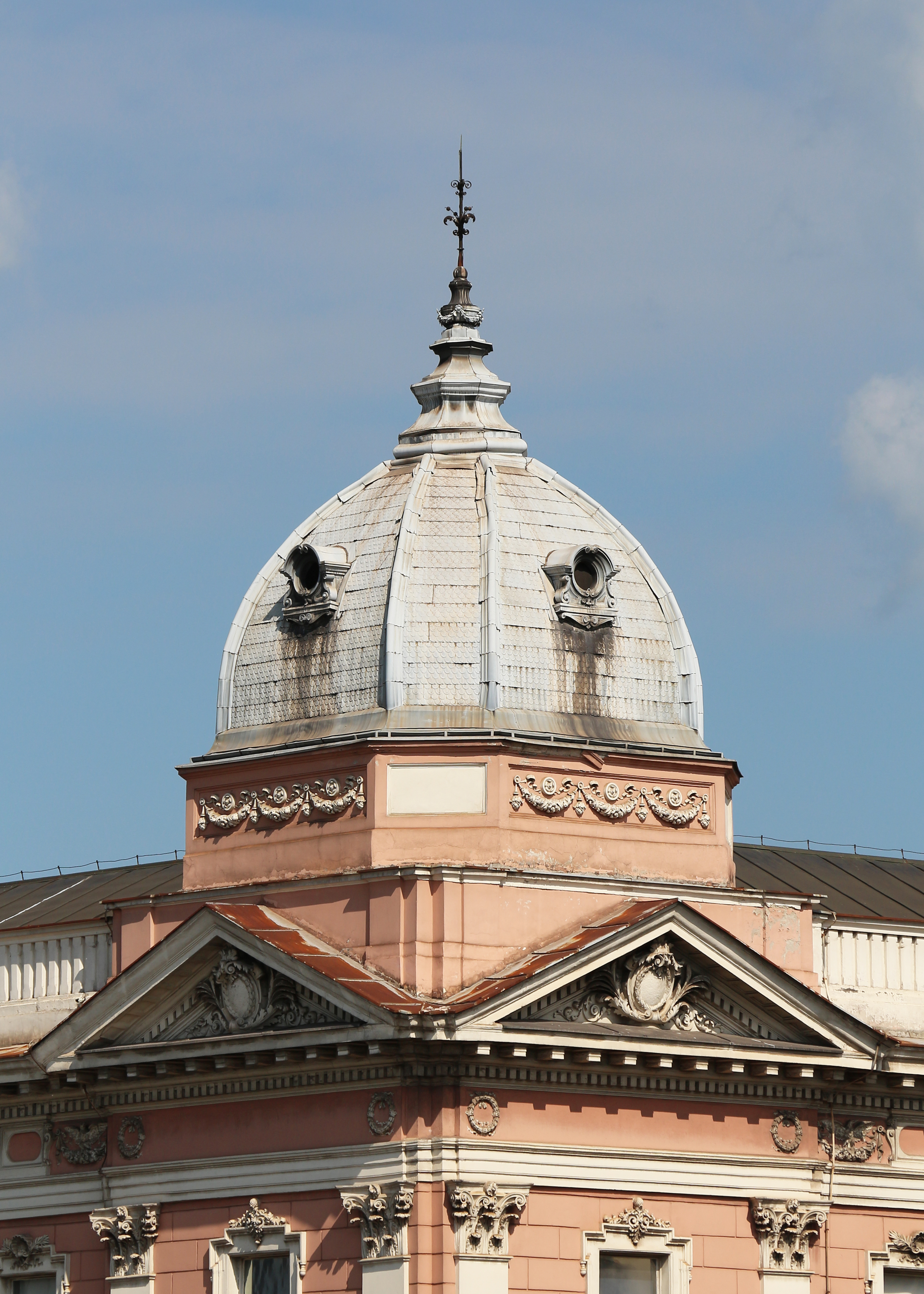
The dome of the building

The Miroslav Krleža Institute of Lexicography (Croatian: Leksikografski zavod Miroslav Krleža or LZMK) is Croatia's national lexicographical institution. Based in Zagreb, it was established in 1950 as the national lexicographical institute of the Socialist Federal Republic of Yugoslavia. It was renamed after its founder, the Croatian writer Miroslav Krleža, in 1983.

== History ==
The institute was founded in 1950 as the Lexicographical Institute of the Federal People's Republic of Yugoslavia (Leksikografski zavod FNRJ) and was renamed the Yugoslav Lexicographical Institute (Jugoslavenski leksikografski zavod, JLZ) in 1962. The institution was originally established as a federal body under de facto responsibility of the Federal Executive Council while its “founding rights” were relegated to the Socialist Republic of Croatia in 1970s.

Its longtime director was writer Miroslav Krleža, with Mate Ujević as the chief editor. It was based in Zagreb, with branches in Ljubljana and Belgrade. The office in Belgrade was opened in 1981 in the building across the street from the Serbian Academy of Sciences and Arts to simplify communication with majority of other common federal Yugoslav institutions.

After Krleža's death in 1981, the institute was renamed as the Yugoslav Lexicographical Institute "Miroslav Krleža" (Jugoslavenski leksikografski zavod "Miroslav Krleža").

Following the breakup of Yugoslavia, it was renamed to its current name in 1991, becoming the national lexicographical institute of Croatia, situated in 26 Frankopan Street of Zagreb.

== Publications ==
The institute employs numerous scientists in many areas of expertise and issues general and specific reference works as well as maps and travel guides.

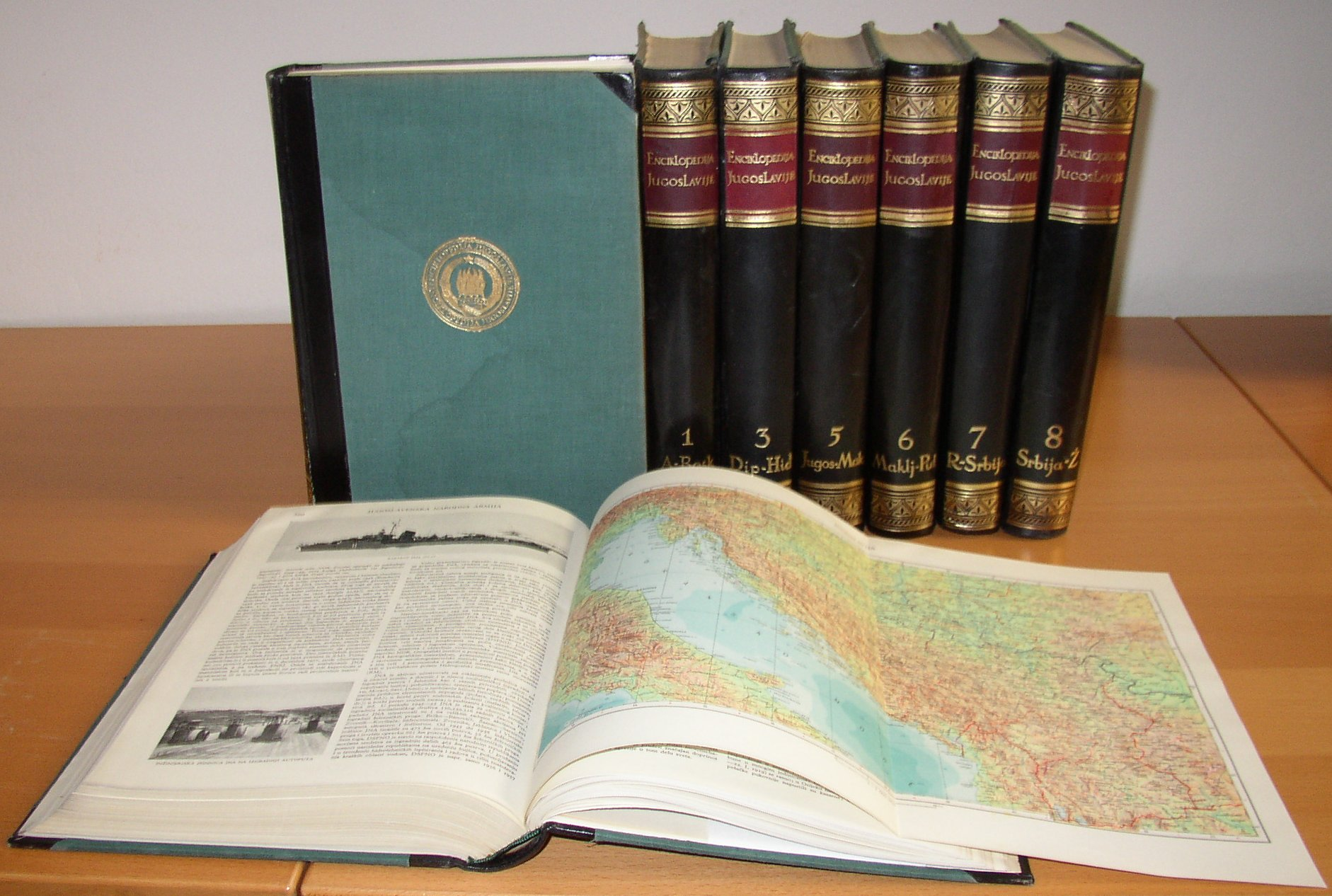
Encyclopedia of Yugoslavia

Some of the major encyclopedic works completed or started by the institute in its Yugoslav period until 1991 were:

- General Encyclopedia (Opća enciklopedija) – 1st ed. in 7 volumes (1955–64) as Encyclopedia of Lexicographical Institute (Enciklopedija Leksikografskog zavoda); 2nd ed. in 6 volumes (1966–69); 3rd ed. in 8 volumes (1977–82), supplemental, 9th volume in 1988
- Encyclopedia of Yugoslavia (Enciklopedija Jugoslavije) – 1st ed. in 8 volumes (1955–71); 2nd ed. with 6 of projected 12 volumes published (1980–90), with additional volumes in Albanian, Macedonian, and Slovene
- Encyclopedia of Forestry (Šumarska enciklopedija) – 1st ed. in 2 volumes (1959–63); 2nd ed. in 3 volumes (1980–87)
- Encyclopedia of Music (Muzička enciklopedija) – 1st ed. in 2 volumes (1958–63); 2nd ed. in 3 volumes (1971–77)
- Maritime Encyclopedia (Pomorska enciklopedija) – 1st ed. in 8 volumes (1954–64); 2nd ed. in 8 volumes (1972–89)
- Medical Encyclopedia (Medicinska enciklopedija) – 1st ed. in 10 volumes (1957–65); 2nd ed. in 8 volumes (1967–86)
- Encyclopedia of Fine Arts (Enciklopedija likovnih umjetnosti) – in 4 volumes (1959–66)
- Encyclopedia of Agriculture (Poljoprivredna enciklopedija) – in 3 volumes (1967–73)
- Encyclopedia of Physical Culture (Enciklopedija fizičke kulture) – in 2 volumes (1975–77)
- Encyclopedia of Yugoslav Fine Arts (Likovna enciklopedija Jugoslavije) – in 2 volumes (1984–87)
- Technical Encyclopedia (Tehnička enciklopedija) – in 13 volumes (1963–97)
- The Film Encyclopedia (Filmska enciklopedija) – in 2 volumes (1986–90)

The institute also published numerous lexicons such as:

- Lexicon JLZ (Leksikon JLZ) – general lexicon (1974)
- Lexicon of Yugoslav Music (Leksikon jugoslavenske muzike) – in 2 volumes (1984)
- Sports Lexicon (Sportski leksikon) – 1984
- Maritime Lexicon (Pomorski leksikon) – 1990

One publication has spanned both the historical eras of Yugoslavia and Croatia, the Croatian Biographical Lexicon (Hrvatski biografski leksikon) – which is still a work in progress, with 9 volumes published between 1983 and 2021.

After 1991 the institute published several major works of the national interest for Croatia:

- Croatian Encyclopedia (Hrvatska enciklopedija) – general and national encyclopedia in 11 volumes (1999–2009)
- The Miroslav Krleža Encyclopedia (Krležijana) – in 3 volumes (1993)
- Encyclopedia of Croatian Art (Enciklopedija hrvatske umjetnosti) – 1st ed. in 2 volumes (1995–96); 2nd ed. in 8 volumes (2005) as Croatian Art Encyclopedia (Hrvatska likovna enciklopedija)
- Dictionary of the Croatian Language (Rječnik hrvatskoga jezika) – 2000
- Atlas of Croatian History (Hrvatski povijesni atlas) – 1st ed. (2003); 2nd ed. (2018)
- Istrian Encyclopedia (Istarska enciklopedija) – regional encyclopedia of Istria in 1 volume (2005)
- Croatian Literary Encyclopedia (Hrvatska književna enciklopedija) – in 4 volumes (2010–12)
- Encyclopedia of Hrvatsko Zagorje (Enciklopedija Hrvatskog Zagorja) – regional encyclopedia of Hrvatsko Zagorje in 1 volume (2017)

It also continued to publish one-volume reference works:

- Lexicon of Medicine (Medicinski leksikon) – 1992
- Lexicon of Economy (Ekonomski leksikon) – 1st ed. (1995); 2nd ed. (2011)
- Croatian General Lexicon (Hrvatski opći leksikon) – 1st ed. (1996); 2nd ed. (2005); 3rd ed. (2012)
- General Lexicon of Religion (Opći religijski leksikon) – 2002
- The Film Lexicon (Filmski leksikon) – 2003
- Lexicon of Soccer (Nogometni leksikon) – 2004
- Lexicon of Zagreb (Zagrebački leksikon) – in 2 volumes (2006)
- Technical Lexicon (Tehnički leksikon) – 2007
- The Law Lexicon (Pravni leksikon) – 2007
- The Marin Držić Lexicon (Leksikon Marina Držića) – 2009
- Lexicon of Fine Arts (Likovni leksikon) – 2014
- The Ruđer Bošković Lexicon (Leksikon Ruđera Boškovića) – 2011
- Lexicon of Philosophy (Filozofski leksikon) – 2012
- The Antun Gustav Matoš Lexicon (Leksikon Antuna Gustava Matoša) – 2015
- Lexicon of Turopolje (Turopoljski leksikon) – regional lexicon of Turopolje (2021)

== Current projects ==
The institute now runs several major projects related to the Croatian language, history and culture. These include:

- online edition of the Croatian Encyclopedia at Hrvatska enciklopedija
- Croatian Biographical Lexicon (since 1975)
- Croatian Technical Encyclopedia, with the portal of Croatian Technical Heritage

== Gallery ==
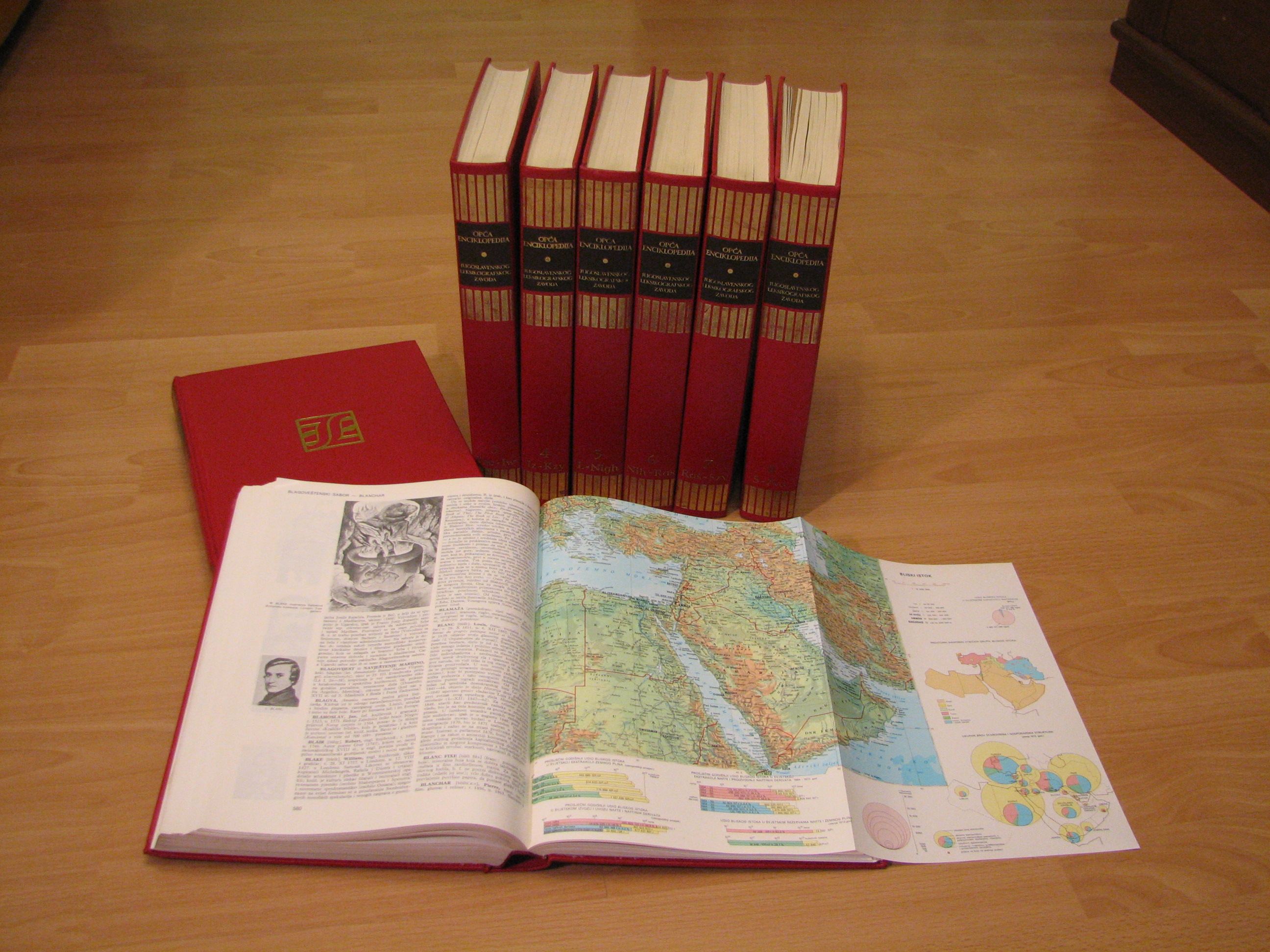

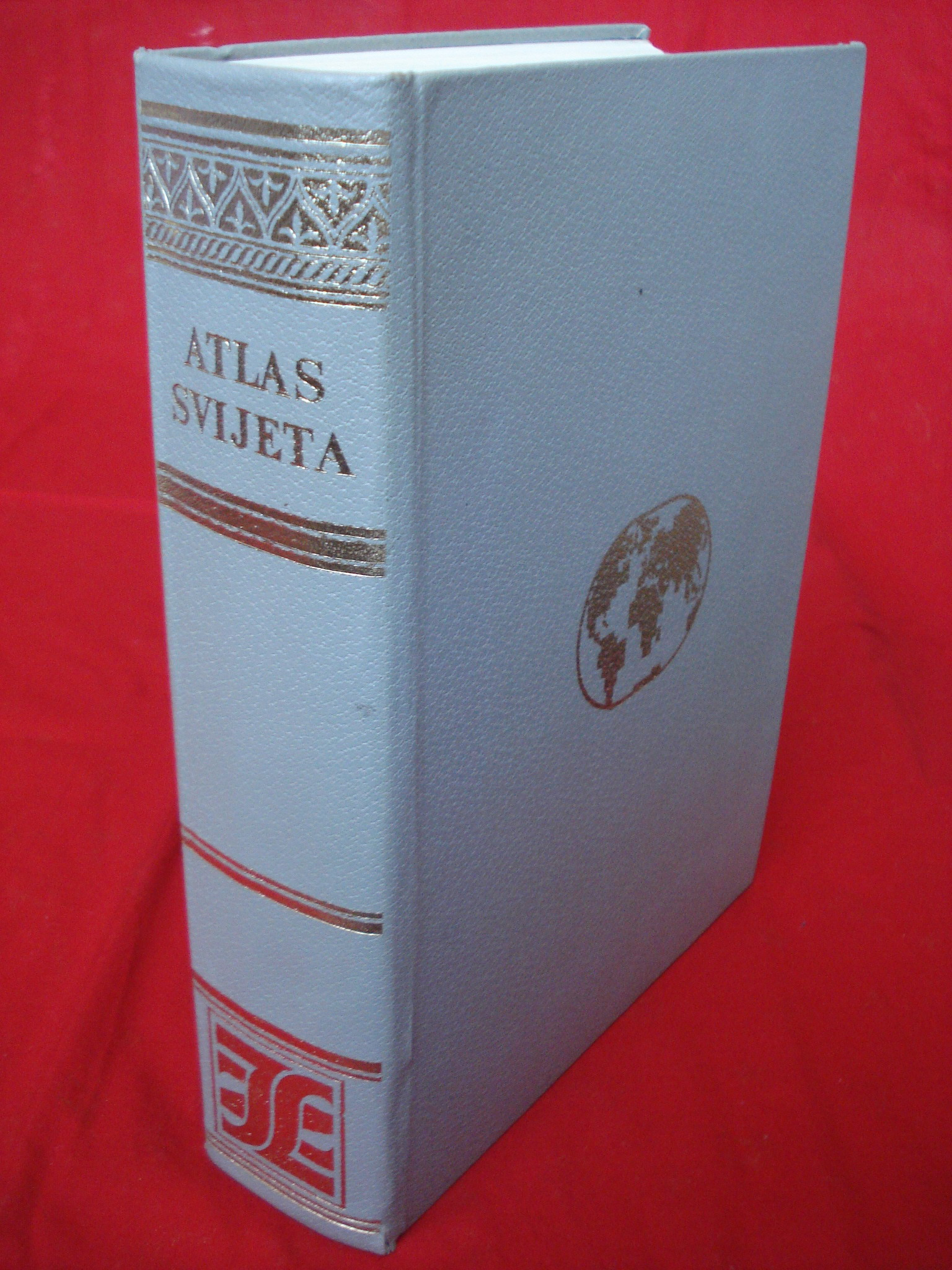
