= General Encyclopedia of the Yugoslav Lexicographical Institute =

Encyclopedia

Opća enciklopedija Jugoslavenskog leksikografskog zavoda (3. izdanje)
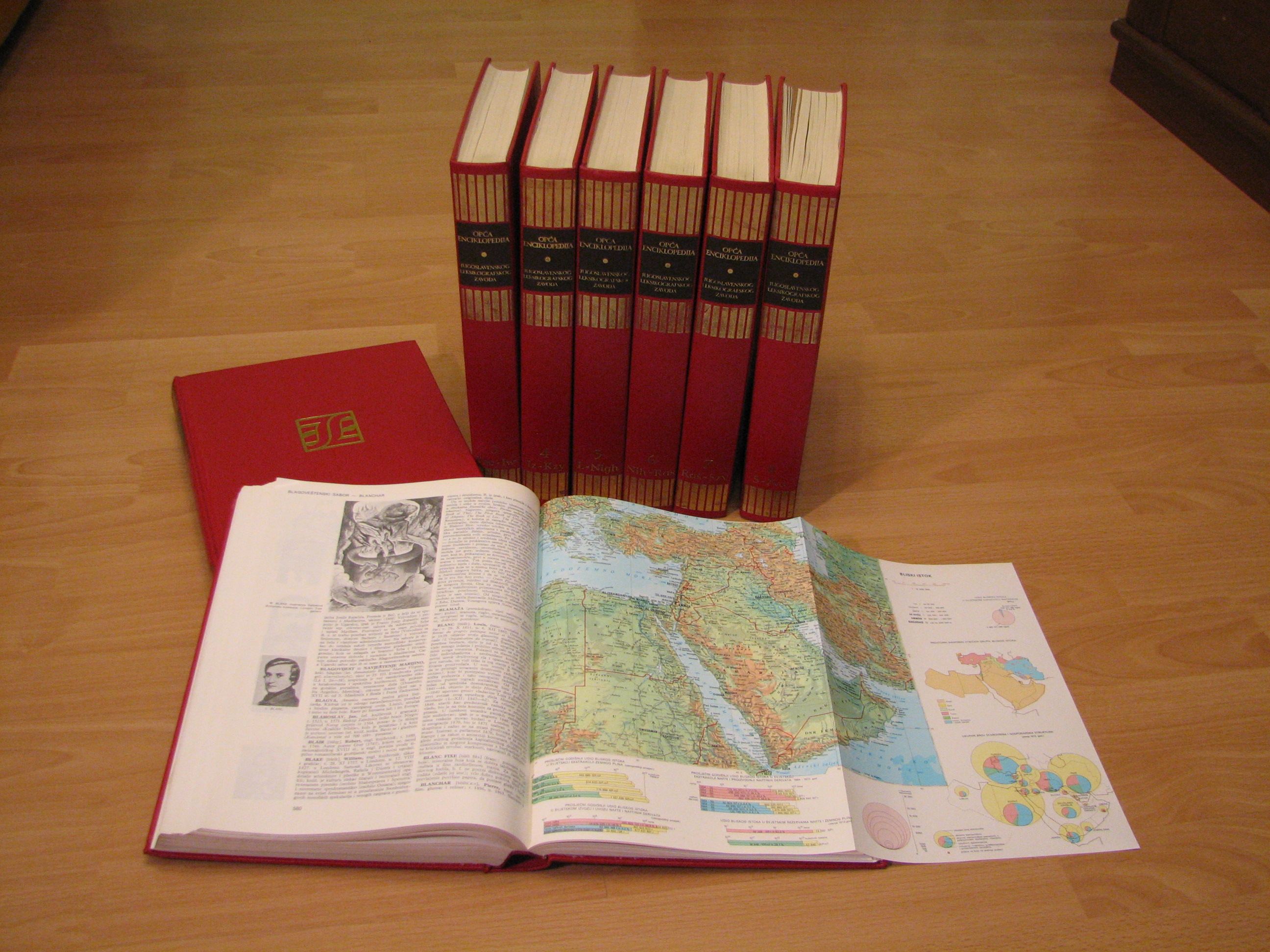
- All eight volumes of the third edition (pictured here without dust jackets)
- Author: Numerous contributors, chief editor Josip Šentija
- Language: Croatian
- Subject: General
- Genre: Reference encyclopedia
- Publisher: Yugoslav Lexicographical Institute, Zagreb
- Publication date: 1977–1982
- Publication place: SFR Yugoslavia
- Media type: 8 volumes (hardbound)
- ISBN: 978-86-7053-012-6
- OCLC: 31939890

The General Encyclopedia of the Yugoslav Lexicographical Institute (Croatian: Opća enciklopedija Jugoslavenskog leksikografskog zavoda) is a general encyclopedia published in eight volumes by the Yugoslav Lexicographical Institute in Zagreb between 1977 and 1982. It was the third edition of the encyclopedia, with the first two editions being published under the name Enciklopedija leksikografskog zavoda (English: Encyclopedia of the Lexicographical Institute). The first edition in seven volumes was published between 1955 and 1964, and the second edition in six volumes was published between 1966 and 1969.

== Volumes ==
The third edition of the encyclopedia has 8 volumes:

Vol.	Article span	Year of publishing	Number of pages
1	A – Bzu	1977	748
2	C – Fob	1977	749
3	Foc – Iw	1977	719
4	Iz – Kzy	1978	703
5	L – Nigh	1979	750
6	Nih – Ras	1980	766
7	Raš – Szy	1981	780
8	Š – Žva	1982	791

The third edition was amended with an additional volume (Dopunski svezak) published in 1988:

Vol.	Article span	Year of publishing	Number of pages
9	A – Ž	1988	752

== See also ==
- Encyclopedia of Yugoslavia
