= Medical News Today =

British web-based medical outlet

- Company type: Private
- Founded: 2003
- Headquarters: Brighton, East Sussex, UK
- Products: Health news and information
- Parent: Healthline Media (Red Ventures)
- Website: medicalnewstoday.com

Medical News Today is a web-based outlet for medical information and news, targeted at both the general public and physicians. All posted content is available online (>250,000 articles as of January 2014), and the earliest available article dates from May 2003. The website was founded in 2003 by Alastair Hazell and Christian Nordqvist. It was acquired by Healthline Media in April 2016.

The business office for the site is located in Brighton, East Sussex, and a second office is maintained near Manchester. As of September 2019, it was the third most visited health site in the United States. As of October 2019, it had a global ranking by Alexa of 869 and a United States ranking of 440.

Medical News Today said it used artificial intelligence to assist in generating article content in 2023-2025, although this claim has now been reversed.
