= Encyclopedia of Genetics =

Print encyclopedia

The Encyclopedia of Genetics (ISBN 0-12-227080-0) is a print encyclopedia of genetics edited by Sydney Brenner and Jeffrey H. Miller. It has four volumes and 1,700 entries.
