= Edwin R. A. Seligman =

American economist (1861–1939)

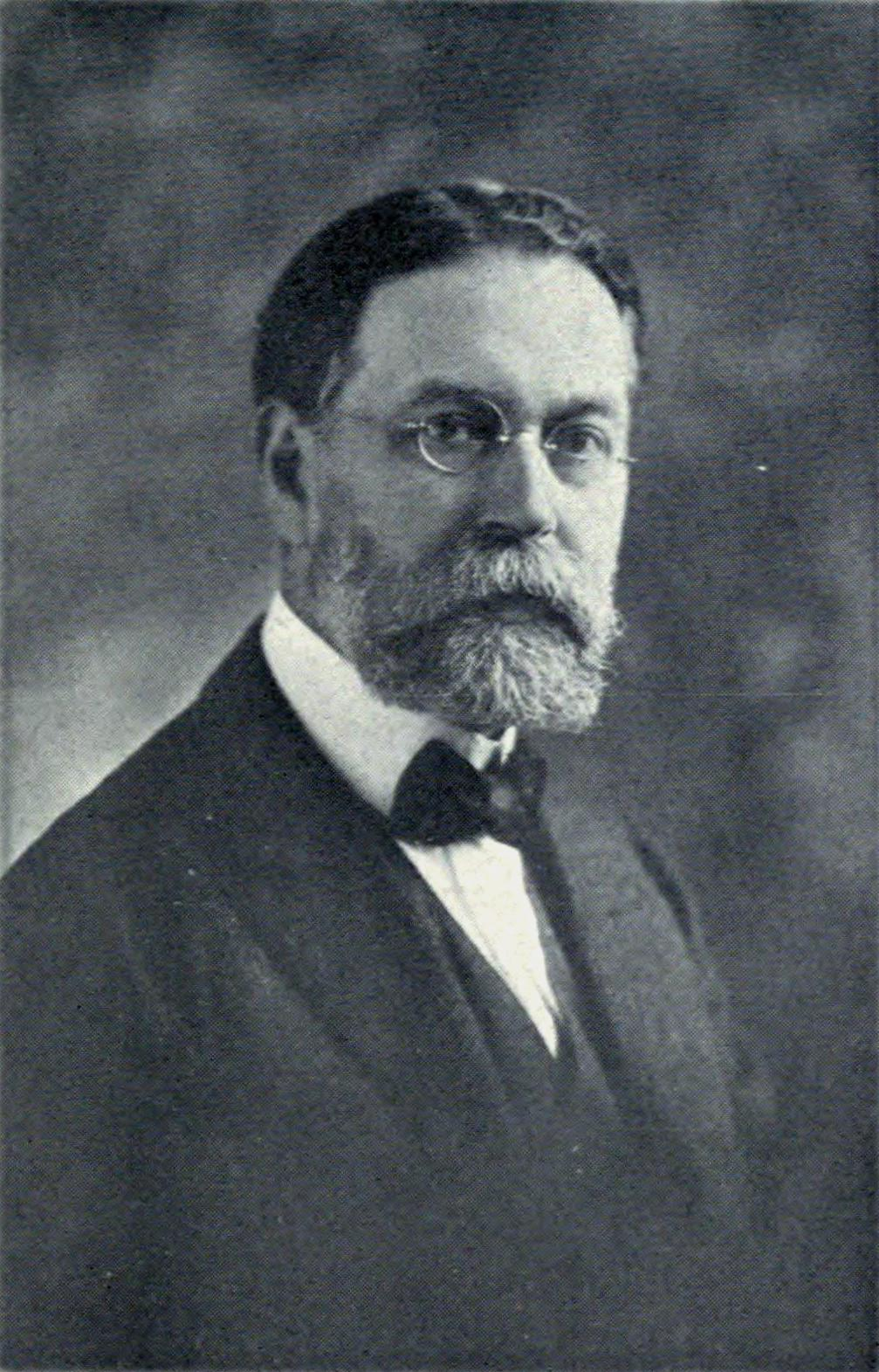
- Born: April 25, 1861; New York City, US
- Died: July 18, 1939 (aged 78); Lake Placid, New York

Academic background
- Education: Columbia University
- Doctoral advisor: John Burgess

Academic work
- Institutions: Columbia University
- Doctoral students: B. R. Ambedkar; Paul Douglas; Robert Murray Haig; Alvin Saunders Johnson

Edwin Robert Anderson Seligman (1861–1939) was an American economist who spent his entire academic career at Columbia University in New York City. Seligman is best remembered for his pioneering work involving taxation and public finance. His principles for a progressive federal income tax were adopted by Congress after the passage of the Sixteenth Amendment. A prolific scholar and teacher, his students had great influence on the fiscal architecture of postcolonial nations. He served as an influential founding member of the American Economics Association.

== Early life ==
Edwin Seligman was born April 25, 1861, in New York City, the son of the banker Joseph Seligman. His family was Jewish. He was tutored by Horatio Alger and had a broad facility for languages.

Seligman attended Columbia University at fourteen, graduated in 1879 with an AB, and was a member of the Philolexian Society. Seligman continued his studies in Europe, attending courses for three years at the universities of Berlin, Heidelberg, Geneva, and Paris. He earned his MA and LLB degrees in 1885 and successfully defended a PhD in 1885. He later was awarded a LL.D. in 1904.

== Academic career ==
Seligman spent his entire academic career at Columbia University, first joining as a lecturer in 1885. He was made an adjunct professor of political economy in 1888. From 1891 to 1904, he was professor of political economy and finance. He became the first McVickar Professor of Political Economy at the same university in 1904, a position which he occupied until 1931.

Seligman's academic work dealt largely with matters of taxation and public finance, and he was regarded as a leading proponent of the progressive income tax. He also taught courses at Columbia in the field of economic history.

Seligman dedicated a great deal of effort to the question of public finance during World War I and was a prominent advocate of the establishment of a progressive income tax as a basis for the funding of government operations.

Seligman's later academic work revolved around questions of tax policy and consumer finance.

Although a proponent of the economic interpretation of history, commonly associated with Marxism, Seligman was an opponent of socialism and appeared in public debates opposing prominent radical figures during the early 1920s, including such figures as Scott Nearing and Harry Waton.

Among his students was B.R. Ambedkar, the Chief architect of Indian Constitution and first Law and Justice minister of India. Seligman became professor emeritus in 1931.

=== Professional leadership ===
From 1886 Seligman was one of the editors of the Political Science Quarterly. He also edited Columbia's series in history, economics, and public law from 1890.

Seligman was a founder of the American Economic Association and served as president of that organization from 1902 to 1904.

Selignman was a key figure in the formation of the American Association of University Professors. He chaired the committee that wrote the "1915 Declaration of Principles on Academic Freedom and Academic Tenure," now considered a landmark statement on academic freedom. He served as AAUP president from 1919 to 1920.

== Death and legacy ==
Edwin Seligman died in Lake Placid, New York, on July 18, 1939. His beliefs were highly influential with Charles A. Beard, who was an academic colleague at Columbia. In particular, Seligman's economic viewpoints to history helped inform Beard's work An Economic Interpretation of the Constitution of the United States. As a mentor to fiscal experts including Carl Shoup, Seligman's ideas also guided post-World War II tax reform.

== Works ==
=== Books and pamphlets ===
- Railway Tariffs and the Interstate Commerce Act. Boston: Ginn and Company, 1887.
- The General Property Tax. Boston: Ginn and Company, 1890.
- Progressive Taxation in Theory and Practice (1894). Second Edition. Princeton University Press, 1908.
- The Shifting and Incidence of Taxation (1899). Second Edition. New York: Macmillan, 1902.
- Report of the Committee of Economists on the dismissal of Professor Ross from Leland Stanford Junior University. Detroit?: The Committee?, 1901.
- The Economic Interpretation of History. New York: Macmillan, 1902.
- Essays in Taxation. New York: Macmillan, 1905.
- Principles of Economics: With Special Reference to American Conditions. New York: Longmans, Green and Co., 1905.
- The Income Tax: A Study of the History, Theory and Practice of Income Taxation at Home and Abroad. New York: Macmillan, 1911.
- The Social Evil: With Special Reference to Conditions Existing in the City of New York. (Editor.) New York: G.P. Putnam's Sons, 1912.
- An Economic Interpretation of the War. New York: D. Appleton and Co., 1915.
- The Next Step in Tax Reform: Presidential Address of Edwin R. A. Seligman, LL. D., Delivered at the Ninth Annual Conference of the National Tax Association, San Francisco, August 11, 1915. New York: National Tax Association, 1915.
- A University School of Business. Columbia University Press, 1916.
- How to Finance the War. With Robert Murray Haig. New York: Division of Intelligence and Publicity of Columbia University, 1917.
- Financial Mobilization for War: Papers Presented at a Joint Conference of the Western Economic Society and the City Club of Chicago, June 21 and 22, 1917. (Editor.) University of Chicago Press, 1917.
- The House Revenue Bill: A Constructive Criticism. New York: Division of Intelligence and Publicity of Columbia University, 1917.
- Currency Inflation and Public Debts: An Historical Sketch. New York: Equitable Trust Company of New York, 1921.
- A Public Debate: Capitalism vs. Socialism: Professor Edwin R.A. Seligman, Columbia University, vs. Professor Scott Nearing, Rand School of Social Science. New York: The Fine Arts Guild, 1922.
- Stenographer's Report of the Selig vs. Waton Debate. New York: Marx-Engels Institute, 1922.
- Studies in Public Finance. New York: Macmillan, 1925.
- Essays in Economics. New York: Macmillan, 1925.
- The Economics of Instalment Selling: A Study in Consumers' Credit, with Special Reference to the Automobile. New York: Harper and Brothers, 1927.
- The Economics of Farm Relief: A Survey of the Agricultural Problem. Columbia University Press, 1929.
- Price Cutting and Price Maintenance: A Study in Economics. With Robert Alonzo Love. New York: Harper and Brothers, 1932.
- A Report on the Revenue System of Cuba. With Carl S. Shoup. Havana: Talleres tipográficos de Carasa y cía., 1932

=== Selected articles ===
- "Economists," in Cambridge History of English and American Literature, 1907.
- "The Crisis of 1907 in the Light of History," in Edwin R.A. Seligman (ed.), The Currency Problem and the Present Financial Situation: A Series of Addresses Delivered at Columbia University 1907-1908. Columbia University Press, 1908.
- "Recent Reports on State and Local Taxation," American Economic Review, 1911.
- "The Crisis in Social Evolution," in Albert Bushnell Hart, et al., Problems of Readjustment After the War. New York: D. Appleton & Co., 1915.
- "Tax Exemption Through Tax Capitalization: A Reply," American Economic Review, 1916.
- "Loans versus Taxes in War Finance," in Financing the War. Philadelphia: Annals of the American Academy of Political and Social Science, vol. 75, 1918.
- "Who is the Twentieth Century Mandeville?" American Economic Review, 1918.
- "Are Stock Dividends Income?" American Economic Review, 1919.
- "The Cost of the War and How It Was Met," American Economic Review, vol. 9, no. 4 (Dec. 1919), pp. 739–770.
