= Mate Ujević =

Croatian poet and encyclopedist

Mate Ujević (13 July 1901 – 6 January 1967) was a Croatian poet and encyclopedist.

== Life ==
Ujević was born in Krivodol (part of Podbablje near Imotski) in the Kingdom of Dalmatia (present-day Croatia). He received his secondary education in Sinj and Split and studied literature in Zagreb. He bachelored in Ljubljana and finished his doctoral dissertation on poet Jovan Hranilović in Zagreb. In 1941 he was named the director of the institute in charge of the Croatian Encyclopedia, on which he worked until May 1945.

During World War II, Ujević rescued Manko Berman, a Jewish encyclopedist and close friend, as well as two Jewish sisters from being deported to the Jasenovac concentration camp. As a result of these actions, Yad Vashem later honored him as one of the Righteous among the Nations.

In 1950 he began work with the Yugoslav Lexicographical Institute (today's Miroslav Krleža Lexicographical Institute) where he remained until his retirement in 1965. He died in Zagreb.

== Works ==
- Mladost Tome Ivića (1928)
- Hrvatska književnost (1932)
- Gradišćanski Hrvati (1934)
- Hrvatska narodna pjesmarica (1938)
- Hrvatska enciklopedija [Croatian Encyclopedia] (1941–1945)

== See also ==
- Croatian Righteous among the Nations
