= House of Kušević =

Croatian and Hungarian noble family

Kušević
- Country: Kingdom of Croatia
- Founded: 1676
- Founder: Petar Kušević
- Titles: Baron

The House of Kušević is a noble family originating in the Habsburg realm of the Kingdom of Croatia.

== Notable members ==
The Kušević family was first noted in a document dated to 1496, specifically an Andrija Kušević living in the area of Karlovac, as well as another Andrija Kušević, in the Ozalj area in 1642. Petar Kušević (c. 1631–?) was the first Kušević granted Hungarian and Croatian nobility in 1676. The award was confirmed by the Croatian Parliament. Nikola Kušević is recorded as the owner of the Gradac estate near Karlovac in 1716. From 1715, he commanded a unit in the Croatian Military Frontier, reaching the position of the Karlovac Generalate commissioner in 1719. Baltazar Kušević was a captain in the Croatian Military Frontier in 1736.

The most notable members of the Croatian branch of the House of Kušević born in the 18th century and later:
- Franjo Kušević (1700–1772) was a lawyer and a judge in Samobor and Zagreb. He significantly increased the family's estates by acquiring Trešćerovac and Trešćeno near Ozalj, and Gornja Švarča near Karlovac. He also became the leaseholder of the Samobor estate. He was the owner of the first domestically-owned factory. In 1750s, he established production of cloth in Ksaver (present-day part of Zagreb). His investment encouraged other noble families to invest in industry. Since 1959, the National and University Library in Zagreb keeps the Kušević library collected by Franjo and his grandson Josip.
  - Sigismund Kušević (1720–1802) was a judge in Samobor and Zagreb.
    - Konstancija Justina Kušević (1774–1858) was the mother of poet Antun Mihanović, the author of the lyrics of Lijepa naša domovino.
    - Josip Kušević (1775–1846) was the prothonotary of the Habsburg Kingdom of Croatia and a member of the Croatian Parliament and the Diet of Hungary. He opposed introduction of Hungarian language as the official language in Croatia. He is known for De municipalibus iuribus et statutis regnorum Dalmatiae, Croatiae et Slavoniae – the work compiling and advocating the rights of Croatia to a special status within the Austrian Empire and the Kingdom of Hungary, i.e. the Croatian state right. His work influenced the Illyrian movement.
      - Milan Kušević (1807–1887) was an officer of the Imperial Austrian Army. He commanded the 27th Infantry Regiment in the rank of colonel, taking part in the suppression of the Revolution of 1848–1849 in the Hungarian region of Banat, earning the rank of major general. He was appointed a member of the judicial council of the Austria's Supreme Military Court in 1850–1851. In 1857, he became the Inhaber of the 77th Infantry Regiment. He received the Order of Leopold and the title of baron of Samobor. In 1865, he was appointed the Chancellor at the Croatian Court Chancellery. In 1869, he was promoted to the rank of the general of the artillery and retired. He was subsequently appointed the Inhaber of the 33rd Line Infantry Regiment.
        - Ivo Kušević (1837–1903) married Natalija Bužan of the House of Bužan, acquiring a manor in Vidovec near Varaždin.
      - Marcel Kušević (1809–1848) was an Imperial Austrian Army grenadier captain killed on the final day of the Five Days of Milan insurrection.
        - Hermina Ferić (1844–1923), born Hermina Kušević, was a sculptor trained by Anton Dominik Fernkorn. In 1907, she collaborated with sculptor Robert Frangeš-Mihanović.
        - Marcel Kušević (1848–1931) was a civil engineer. He graduated from the ETH Zurich in 1870. He took part in building of the Zagreb–Rijeka railway, leading the works between Moravice and Skrad. In 1874, he was hired to manage construction of railroad in Istria near Buzet. From 1876 he mostly worked in road construction, providing planning and design documents for more than 700 kilometres (430 mi) of roads and four bridges. He retired to his estate in Mala Mlaka where he developed dairy production.
      - Aurel Kušević (1813–1895) graduated from the Faculty of Law, University of Zagreb in 1832 before being hired by the Croatian State Archives in 1840.He was elected a member of the council of nobility of the municipality of Turopolje in 1844, as a prominent supporter of the Croatian-Hungarian Party. He was dismissed from the state archive following accusations of supplying documents held in the archive to his political allies in 1848. He fled Croatia to Hungary, and shortly afterwards, his assets were seized. During his exile, the Hungarian government hired him in an advisory position. In 1849, Ban of Croatia Josip Jelačić approved his return to Croatia, and he was issued a certificate confirming he would not be prosecuted. In 1861–1875, he was an elected representative to the Croatian Parliament, and a member of the Diet of Hungary in 1868. He had a manor and a park built at the Mala Mlaka estate.
      - Valerije Kušević (?–1826)
    - Ladislav Kušević (1778–1860) held the command of the 37th Infantry Regiment of the Imperial Austrian Army in the rank of a colonel. He was promoted to the rank of Major General in 1837 and awarded the honorary rank of Lieutenant Field Marshal in 1844.
    - Katarina Amalija Kušević (1779–1835) was the grandmother of writer Ksaver Šandor Gjalski.

== See also ==
- List of noble families of Croatia
- List of titled noble families in the Kingdom of Hungary

== Sources ==
- "Knjižnica obitelji Kušević" [Kušević Family Library] (in Croatian). National and University Library in Zagreb.
- Despot, Miroslava (1960). "Križevačka manufaktura peći i suđa u XVIII. st" [Križevci Manufacture of Furnaces and Dishes in the 18th Century]. Historijski zbornik (in Croatian). 13 (1–4). Zagreb: Društvo za hrvatsku povjesnicu: 209–214. ISSN 0351-2193.
- Horbec, Ivana (2013). "Kušević, Franjo". Croatian Biographical Lexicon (in Croatian). Miroslav Krleža Institute of Lexicography.
- Leskovec, Vlatka; Majnarić, Ivan (2013). "Kušević, Milan". Croatian Biographical Lexicon (in Croatian). Miroslav Krleža Institute of Lexicography.
- Milković, Kristina (2013). "Kušević, Josip". Croatian Biographical Lexicon (in Croatian). Miroslav Krleža Institute of Lexicography.
- Pongrac, Tin (2013a). "Kušević". Croatian Biographical Lexicon (in Croatian). Miroslav Krleža Institute of Lexicography.
- Pongrac, Tin (2013b). "Kušević, Aurel". Croatian Biographical Lexicon (in Croatian). Miroslav Krleža Institute of Lexicography.
- Radauš, Tatjana (1998). "Ferić, Hermina". Croatian Biographical Lexicon (in Croatian). Miroslav Krleža Institute of Lexicography.
- Vujasinović, Branko (2013). "Kušević, Marcel". Croatian Biographical Lexicon (in Croatian). Miroslav Krleža Institute of Lexicography.
