= Josip Kušević =

Croatian politician (1775–1846)

Josip Kušević Joseph Kussevich
- Portrait of Josip Kušević by Ferdinand von Lütgendorff-Leinburg (1827)
- Born: 23 May 1775; Samobor, Croatia, Kingdom of Hungary
- Died: 5 July 1846 (aged 71); Meidling (Vienna), Austrian Empire
- Occupations: Politician, lawyer
- Known for: De municipalibus iuribus et statutis regnorum Dalmatiae, Croatiae et Slavoniae
- Relatives: Antun Mihanović (nephew)

Josip Kušević (also spelled Joseph Kussevich, 23 May 1775 – 5 July 1846) was a Croatian politician and lawyer. He was the prothonotary of the Croatian realm and a member of the Croatian Parliament and the Diet of Hungary. As a politician, he opposed the introduction of Hungarian as the official language in Croatia. Kušević is known for De municipalibus iuribus et statutis regnorum Dalmatiae, Croatiae et Slavoniae – the work compiling and advocating the rights of Croatia to a special status within the Austrian Empire and the Kingdom of Hungary, i.e. the Croatian state right.

Kušević's work influenced the Illyrian movement and he was held in high regard by supporters of the movement. He held the view that the South Slavs were indigenous population who had inhabited the Balkan Peninsula in ancient times. In turn, he linked the South Slavs with the Illyrians and hypothesised that there was a common South Slavic language which he referred to as the Croatian-Slavic-Illyrian language.

== Early life and family ==
Kušević was born in Samobor (Note: At the time, Samobor was located in the Kingdom of Croatia. The land was a part of the Hungarian crown, which was in turn a part of the Habsburg monarchy.) on 23 May 1775. He attended the Classical Gymnasium in Zagreb before studying philosophy and law at the University of Zagreb and the Royal University of Pest. From 1796, Kušević practiced law in Zagreb, and worked as a clerk of the Zagreb County. He contributed to preservation of the Law Faculty of Zagreb University by publicly speaking against the royal decree to abolish the institution in 1803. Two years later, Kušević became a notary and received appointment as a member of the Royal Court Table.

The House of Kušević belonged to the Hungarian-Croatian nobility from the 17th century. Kušević's grandfather Franjo was the leaseholder of the Samobor estate and owned further estates in the vicinity of the towns of Karlovac and Ozalj. His father Sigismund was a judge in Samobor and Zagreb. Kušević's sister Justina was the mother of poet Antun Mihanović. He had sons Milan, Aurel, Marcel, and Valerije.

== Political career ==
In 1808, the Croatian Parliament appointed Kušević as prothonotary of the kingdoms of Dalmatia, Croatia and Slavonia, which were Habsburg monarchy realms at the time. (Note: Following the defeat of the Ottoman Empire in the Ottoman–Habsburg wars, and the subsequent eastward withdrawal of the Ottoman Empire, a portion of the land thus acquired by the Habsburg Monarchy was organised and administered as the Kingdom of Slavonia. Areas along the eastern coast of the Adriatic Sea controlled by the Republic of Venice and the Republic of Ragusa until the Napoleonic Wars were awarded to the Habsburg-ruled Austrian Empire after the defeat of Napoleon. A portion of those territories was organised and administered as the Kingdom of Dalmatia. The mother tongue of the entire area of the Habsburg realms of the Croatia, Slavonia and Dalmatia was, for the most part, the speech that was later used as the basis of the Croatian literary language. That speech was referred to as the Croatian, or the Slavonic, or the Illyrian. Unification of Croatia, Slavonia, and Dalmatia, collectivelly referred to as the Triune Kingdom, was a major objective of Croatian politicians. In 1802, the Croatian Parliament first publicly called for the unification of Dalmatia and Croatia. While Slavonia was formally subordinate to the Croatian Ban and Parliament, it was also more closely tied to the Hungarian administration, for example by direct representation in the Diet of Hungary.) That appointment to the position of prothonotary came with a seat in the parliament. The position was the highest-ranking in the realm after the Ban of Croatia as the two officeholders were jointly the head of the judiciary. In 1809, during the War of the Fifth Coalition, Kušević was appointed the head of a commission tasked with the supply of the Habsburg armed forces. After the Treaty of Schönbrunn awarded territory south of the Sava river to the French Empire (subsequently organised as the Illyrian Provinces), Kušević was appointed a member of the commission tasked with marking of the new border which had been determined to correspond to the course of the river.

Kušević led successful suppression of a peasant revolt in parts of Požega County. This mission was ordered by the central authorities of the Austrian Empire and supported by armed troops. The revolt took place in February–July 1815, in the aftermath of poor harvests in 1813 and 1814. It involved 60 villages within the estate of Count Izidor Janković Daruvarski where peasants refused to pay taxes required under 1810 regulations. In 1822, the Zagreb County sent Kušević and Alojzije Bužan to the Congress of Verona to express the county's gratitude to the emperor, Francis I of Austria, for restoring the territory south of the Sava River to Croatia. In 1824, Kušević received an estate in Mala Mlaka near Zagreb through a donation from the emperor and the Palatine of Hungary. Kušević moved to Vienna in 1831 after he was appointed an advisor for Hungary at the imperial court. He died in Meidling (present-day part of Vienna) on 5 July 1846.

== Advocacy of the Croatian state right ==
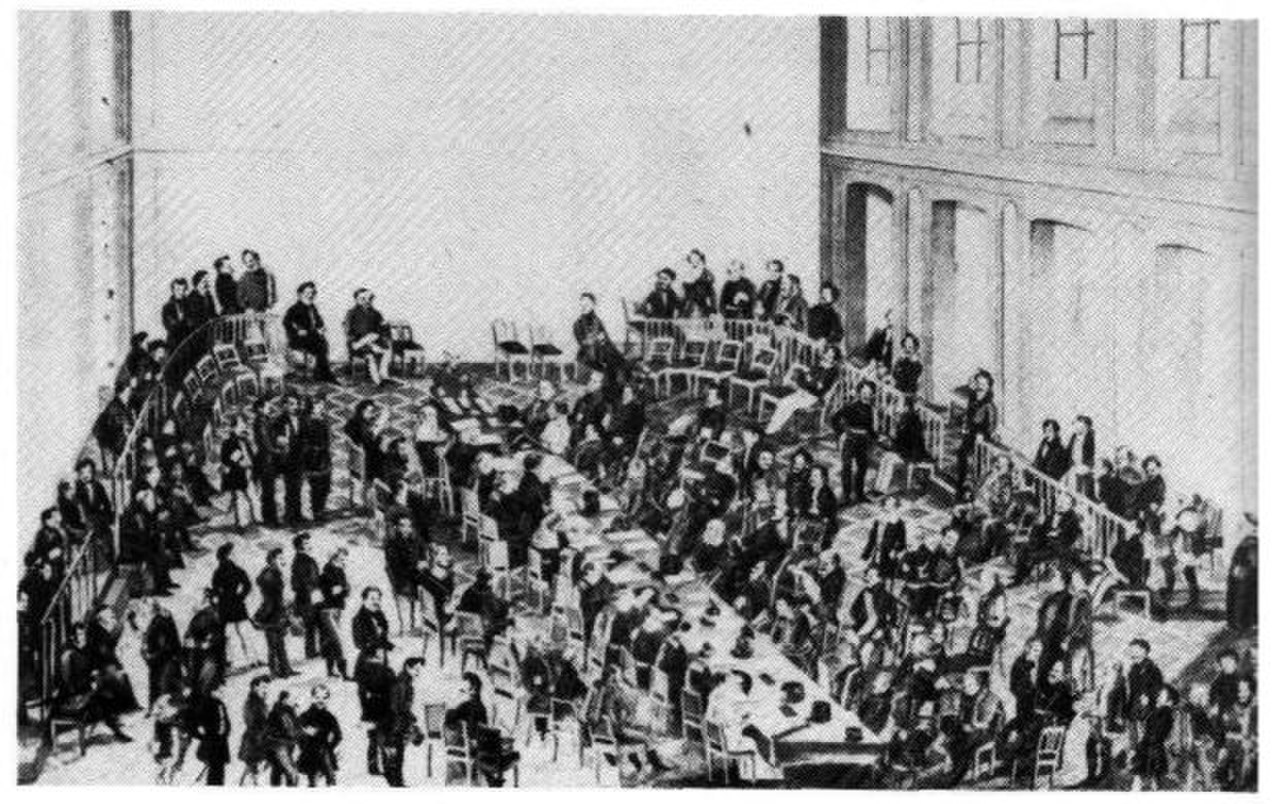
Diet of Hungary of 1830

Kušević distinguished himself as an advocate of Croatia's statehood. As a Croatian Parliament's delegate to the 1825–1827 Diet of Hungary held in Pozsony (present-day Bratislava), Kušević opposed a bill to replace Latin with Hungarian as official language of Croatia in a speech held on 26 February 1826. Kušević said that the Diet had no right to decide on the language used in public affairs of other realms. In Kušević's view, the use of the Latin language in the role of the language of government in Croatia, Slavonia and Dalmatia was a constitutional right of the nation which had to be defended. He argued that the use of the Latin language in all those lands can be traced to the Roman Empire and considered the official use of Latin a means of protection of Croatian national identity—particularly against attempts of Germanisation or Magyarisation of Croatia through imposition of German and Hungarian languages in official use from late 18th century.

Kušević compared Hungary with Switzerland (Note: Switzerland has four official languages at the level of the confederation: German, French, Italian, and Romansh language. Cantons constituting the confederation apply the territorial principle in determination of the official language within a given canton. According to that principle, the cantons use the traditionally spoken language as the official language and give that language prefernece in local government and education. Furthermore, according to the territorial principle, no region may be forced to change its official language.) and the United States (Note: The Constitution of the United States deliberately avoided specifying any official language, and it remained silent on the matter. No attempts to modify the situation were taken before the late 20th century.) as multinational states, urging Hungarian lawmakers to follow the example set by those countries in relation to selection of the official language. Kušević argued that the right to determine the official language in Croatia belonged to the Croatian Parliament alone on the basis of articles of law previously confirmed by the king. The speech led to a debate where Hungarian Diet members claimed that the Croatian position was similar to that of the northern Hungarian counties (largely corresponding to the present-day Slovakia), while Croatian delegates argued that Croatia enjoyed the status of a federal realm with its own rights, laws, customs, and liberties. Representatives of the king agreed with the Croatian position, denying the Diet the right to determine the official language in Croatia. Kušević's opposition to the bill was motivated by his belief that compromising a single right would endanger all other Croatian rights.

Even though the speech was included in the minutes of the Diet, Kušević was displeased with the way it was abridged and had it printed and published separately as the Sermo magistri Josephi Kussevich ... in comitiali Sessione 26. Februarii 1826. pronunciatus. Namely, in addition to being abridged, the manner in which this was performed changed the meaning of parts of the speech to the opposite of what the author had intended. In 1827, the Diet of Hungary appointed him to a commission tasked with compiling municipal ordinances and statutes and preparing proposals for reforms of public affairs. Kušević used the information gathered to write and (anonymously) publish the first systematic work on the Croatian state right, De municipalibus iuribus et statutis regnorum Dalmatiae, Croatiae et Slavoniae in 1830. In the work consisting of 36 articles, Kušević stated the rights supporting Croatia's special position as a state within the framework of the Kingdom of Hungary and the Austrian Empire. A portion of the work analysed the medieval Croatian state, and the rest presented municipal rights of the realm. In the work, Kušević argued that Croatia was autonomous from Austria and Hungary and that the autonomy was evident from the fact that Croatia was ruled on the basis of its own laws and the customary law. His argument was that the defence of the right to enact own laws was equal to the defence of Croatian autonomy. A year later, Kušević informed the Croatian Parliament that he had written the work to inform patriotic youth of their rights. He distributed 500 of the 1000 printed copies of the work to those present. Publication of the book contributed to the emergence of a Croatian historiography and acted as a rallying point in the Croatian political sphere. It also contributed to the establishment of the Croatian state right as a Croatian state-building ideology. A Croatian translation of the work was published in 1883.

== Influence on the Illyrian movement ==
Kušević's work served as an inspiration to the so-called Illyrian movement of Croatian national revival. His speech against the introduction of Hungarian language in official use in Croatia was one of the first three texts (Note: The other two are Ljudevit Gaj's Concise Basis for a Croatian-Slavonic Orthography and Ivan Derkos's Genius patriae super dormientibus suis filiis.) to give rise to the patriotic sentiment that would result in the national revival movement. The movement adopted his interpretation of history as not only an account of what happened, but also a guide for learning and personal development. In turn, the Illyrian movement's proponents pointed out that a thorough and accurate knowledge of history is a prerequisite for correct political, cultural and social activities. The Illyrian movement also took over Kušević's views of history from the viewpoint of Croatian nobility and its rights, adapting it to the needs of creation of the modern Croatian nation. Namely, when Kuševič spoke of Croatia's constitutional rights, he attributed them to Croatian nobility. The national revival adapted this by attributing the same rights to Croats in general.

The adoption of Kušević's opinion also encompassed a hypothesised link between the South Slavs and the Illyrians. He believed that the South Slavs were an indigenous population originating in the Illyrians who inhabited the Balkan Peninsula in ancient times. This view led him to hypothesise that there was a common South Slavic language, which he referred to as the idioma Croatico-Slavico-Illyricum ('Croatian-Slavic-Illyrian language'). This hypothesis influenced the name "Illyrian movement". Namely, Count Janko Drašković adopted the same idea in 1832 in his Dissertation, the work that practically became the political programme of the Croatian national revival movement. The Dissertation referred to Croatian lands of Croatia, Dalmatia and Slavonia (collectivelly referred to as the Triune Kingdom at the time), as well as neighbouring territories as the "Great Illyria" or "Illyric Kingdom". Kušević was admired by prominent figures of the Croatian national revival. In 1831, Pavao Štoos dedicated his poem Nut novo leto! Mati – sin – zorja (commonly referred to as the Kip domovine vu početku leta 1831). Štoos depicted Kušević as a model patriot, and thought of him as a significant historical person. Today, Kušević is considered an early participant in the Croatian revival movement.

== Material legacy ==
Kušević's library (including material inherited from his predecessor at the post of the prothonotary, Nicolaus Skerlecz de Lomnicza) is preserved and kept as a special collection by the National and University Library in Zagreb. In 1813, Kušević made a donation to the Hungarian National Museum. A record of the donation indicates it was a war trophy won in the 1684 Siege of Virovitica, but specific information on the donated object was lost in the meantime.

== Sources ==
- Altarriba, Jeanette; Heredia, Roberto R. (2011). An Introduction to Bilingualism: Principles and Processes. Hove: Psychology Press. ISBN 9781135608538.
- Bratulić, Josip (2007). "Janko Drašković u krugu hrvatskih preporoditelja" [Janko Drašković in the Circle of Croatian Revivalists]. Kolo (in Croatian) (3). Zagreb: Matica hrvatska. ISSN 1334-0522.
- Del Valle, Sandra (2003). Language Rights and the Law in the United States: Finding Our Voices. Bristol: Multilingual Matters. ISBN 9781853596582.
- Faingold, Eduardo D. (2020). Language Rights and the Law in the United States and Its Territories. Lanham: Rowman & Littlefield. ISBN 9781498571371.
- Gavrilović, Slavko (1957). "Agrarni pokreti u Sremu, Slavoniji i Moslavini početkom XIX. veka" [Agrarian Movements in Syrmia, Slavonia, and Moslavina in Early 19th Century]. Historijski zbornik (in Serbian). 10 (1–4). Zagreb: Društvo za hrvatsku povjesnicu: 71–82. ISSN 0351-2193.
- Heka, László (2013). "Hrvatsko-ugarski javnopravni prijepori" [Croatian-Hungarian Debates on Public Law (Jus Publicum)]. Zbornik Pravnog fakulteta u Zagrebu (in Croatian). 63 (5–6). Zagreb: University of Zagreb: 1257–1292. ISSN 0350-2058.
- Heka, László (2023). "Hrvatski ban: prava i ovlasti tijekom tisućgodišnje opstojnosti: mađarska ustavno-povijesna perspektiva" [The Croatian Ban: Rights and Powers During a Millenium of Existence: The Hungarian Constitutional-Historical Perspective]. Zbornik Pravnog fakulteta Sveučilišta u Rijeci (in Croatian). 44 (2). Rijeka: University of Rijeka: 435–453. doi:10.30925/zpfsr.44.2.7. ISSN 1330-349X.
- Hrobec, Ivana; Matasović, Maja (2018). "Voices in a Country Divided: Linguistic Choices in Early Modern Croatia". In Rjéoutski, Vladislav; Frijhoff, Willem (eds.). Language Choice in Enlightenment Europe: Education, Sociability, and Governance. Amsterdam University Press. pp. 111–142. doi:10.1515/9789048535507-005. ISBN 9789048535507.
- Jakić, Ivana; Balta, Ivan (2007). "Pregled zbivanja u predpreporodnom i preporodnom razdoblju do osnivanja političkih stranaka (1841.)" [A Review of Events in Pre-Revival and Revival Eras Until Establishment of Political Parties (1841)]. Povijesni zbornik: Godišnjak za kulturu i povijesno naslijeđe (in Croatian). 1 (1–2). Osijek: University of Osijek: 273–284. ISSN 1846-3819.
- Kirchner Reill, Dominique (2012). Nationalists Who Feared the Nation: Adriatic Multi-Nationalism in Habsburg Dalmatia, Trieste, and Venice. Redwood City: Stanford University Press. ISBN 9780804778497.
- Kolstø, Pål (2016). Strategies of Symbolic Nation-building in South Eastern Europe. Abingdon-on-Thames: Routledge. ISBN 9781317049364.
- Laszowski, Emilij (1897). "Prinosi Hrvata za madžarski narodni muzej u Budimpešti" [Contributions of Croats to the Hungarian National Museum in Budapest]. Vjesnik Arheološkog muzeja u Zagrebu (in Croatian). 2 (1). Zagreb: Archaeological Museum in Zagreb: 9–20. ISSN 0350-7165.
- May, Stephen (2013). Language and Minority Rights: Ethnicity, Nationalism and the Politics of Language. Abingdon-on-Thames: Routledge. ISBN 9781136837067.
- Milković, Kristina (2013). "Kušević, Josip". Croatian Biographical Lexicon (in Croatian). Miroslav Krleža Institute of Lexicography.
- Pederin, Ivan (2016). "Životopis u "Viencu" poslije Šenoe" [Biography in "Vienac" After Šenoa]. Croatica et Slavica Iadertina (in Croatian). 12/1 (12). Zadar: University of Zadar: 269–310. doi:10.15291/csi.1167. ISSN 1845-6839.
- Pongrac, Tin (2013). "Kušević". Croatian Biographical Lexicon (in Croatian). Miroslav Krleža Institute of Lexicography.
- Schmid, Carol L. (2001). The Politics of Language: Conflict, Identity, and Cultural Pluralism in Comparative Perspective. Oxford University Press. ISBN 9780198031505.
- Sikirić Assouline, Zvjezdana (2009). "Latinitet u hrvatskom društvu prve polovice 19. stoljeća" [Latin Language and Culture in Croatian Society in the First Half of the 19th Century]. Radovi Zavoda za hrvatsku povijest Filozofskoga fakulteta Sveučilišta u Zagrebu (in Croatian). 41 (1). Faculty of Humanities and Social Sciences, University of Zagreb: 257–265. ISSN 0353-295X.
- Sikirić Assouline, Zvjezdana (2015). "The Latin Speeches in the Croatian Parliament: Collective and Personal Identities". In Almási, Gábor; Šubarić, Lav (eds.). Latin at the Crossroads of Identity: The Evolution of Linguistic Nationalism in the Kingdom of Hungary. Leiden: Brill Publishers. pp. 218–236. doi:10.1163/9789004300873_011. ISBN 9789004300873.
- Stamać, Ante (1985). "Elegije Pavla Štoosa i predilirski pjesnički standard" [The Elegies of Pavao Štoos and teh Preillyric Poetical Standard]. Umjetnost riječi (in Croatian) (3). Zagreb: Croatian philological society: 319–325. ISSN 0503-1583.
- Strecha, Mario (1977). "O pitanju metodoloških obrazaca hrvatske historiografije u 19. stoljeću" [On The Issue of Methodological Templates of Croatian Historiography in the 19th Century]. Časopis za suvremenu povijest (in Croatian). 9 (2). Zagreb: Croatian Institute of History: 67–76. ISSN 0590-9597.
- Strecha, Mario (2005). "O nastanku i razvoju moderne hrvatske historiografije u 19. stoljeću" [On Emergence and Development of Modern Croatian Historiography in the 19th Century]. Povijest U Nastavi (in Croatian). 3 (6). Zagreb: Društvo za hrvatsku povjesnicu: 103–116. ISSN 1334-1375.
- Šubarić, Lav (2015). "From the Aftermath of 1784 to the Illyrian Turn: The Slow Demise of the Official Latin in Croatia". In Almási, Gábor; Šubarić, Lav (eds.). Latin at the Crossroads of Identity: The Evolution of Linguistic Nationalism in the Kingdom of Hungary. Leiden: Brill Publishers. pp. 191–217. doi:10.1163/9789004300873_010. ISBN 9789004300873.
- Švab, Mladen (1993). "Drašković, Janko". Croatian Biographical Lexicon (in Croatian). Miroslav Krleža Institute of Lexicography.
