= Janko Drašković =

Croatian politician and poet (1770–1856)

Count Janko Drašković
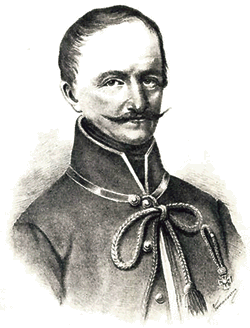
- Count Janko Drašković
- Born: 20 October 1770; Zagreb, Croatia, Kingdom of Hungary
- Died: 14 January 1856 (aged 85); Bad Radkersburg, Austrian Empire
- Resting place: Mirogoj cemetery, Zagreb
- Occupation: Politician
- Known for: Dissertation; Illyrian movement
- Political party: People's Party
- Spouses: Cecilija Pogledić (m. 1794; death 1808) Franjica Kulmer (m. 1808)
- Awards: Order of Saint Stephen of Hungary

Janko Drašković (Hungarian: Draskovich János; 20 October 1770 – 14 January 1856) was a Croatian politician who is associated with the beginnings of the Illyrian movement, a 19th-century national revival. Drašković studied law and philosophy before joining the military, from which he was discharged on medical grounds. In the 1790s, Drašković pursued a political career, winning a seat in the Croatian Parliament and in the Diet of Hungary.

Drašković advocated for the protection of Croatian interests against the threats of Germanisation and Magyarisation in the Habsburg monarchy, and subsequently in the Austrian Empire, Drašković preferred gradual political reforms; he became a leading figure in the Croatian national revival following the 1832 publication of the Dissertation, a manifesto outlining the main political, cultural, economic, social development and cohesion problems in Croatia. The Dissertation became largely regarded as the programme of the Croatian national revival. Drašković supported and significantly contributed to the group gathered around Ljudevit Gaj in working toward the objective outlined in the Dissertation. Gaj's group and others supporting the objectives of the Croatian national revival became known as Illyrians after the term Drašković used for the unified Croatian lands proposed in the Dissertation.

Drašković's lasting contribution to the culture of Croatia is Matica hrvatska, which he helped establish in 1842. The institution, which was initially named Matica ilirska, was established to promote literacy and knowledge in Croatia – in the national language – to improve the economic circumstances of the country and its people. Drašković served as the first president of the newly established institution, and co-founded the People's Party, one of Croatia's first two political parties. Drašković was the party's first leader and chaired the Croatian Parliament in 1848.

== Background ==
A prominent Croatian noble family, the Draškovići claimed descent from a Crusader knight who had fought in the Fifth Crusade. They were first documented as landowners in the Lika region in the 14th century. Although the family lost lands due to the Ottoman conquests in Croatia, the Draškovići became increasingly powerful. By the 18th century, three Draškovići became Catholic bishops, and one of them rose to the rank of a cardinal. Four other members of the family were viceroys, holding the title of Ban of Croatia, and Ivan III Drašković was also royal lieutenant in Hungary as Palatine. He was rewarded with the comital title in 1631. Some Drašković distinguished themselves as high-ranking officers in the service of the Habsburg dynasty. Among them, Janko's father rose to the rank of Colonel.

The Draškovići held vast estates in Croatia and Transylvania in the Habsburg Empire. Within the empire, Croatia, Hungary, Transylvania, and from 1779 the City of Rijeka formed the Lands of the Hungarian Crown. The Croatian Sabor, or parliament, sent delegates to the bicameral Hungarian Diet—three delegates to the Diet's lower house, and one to the upper house. According to custom, issues of common interest were regulated through consensus in the Diet's Upper House, and the Sabor often rejected claims by Hungarian governmental bodies to interfere in state administration in Croatia. From the 1760s, relationship between Croatia and Hungary (Note: There is a disagreement among sources regarding characterisation of the relationship: "union of crowns" or "personal union" are among the most frequent terms to describe it.) was changing not independently of the Habsburg monarchs' "enlightened absolutism", especially under Joseph II (r. 1780–1790). He virtually abolished Croatia, by replacing the counties—the traditional units of regional administration and self-government—with districts, sometimes uniting Croatian and Hungarian territories in the same district.

After his death, the Sabor decided Croatia's interests need be better protected against the potential return of absolutism and the threat of Germanisation. As the Sabor concluded that Croatia was too weak to defend national interests, it decided to recognise the competence of the Lieutenancy Council—the supreme governmental office in the Kingdom of Hungary—over matters otherwise reserved to Croatian officials appointed by the Sabor. The transfer of power was intended to be temporary, until Croatia regained territories previously lost to the Republic of Venice and the Ottoman Empire. This was explained as a necessary measure for Croatia to have sufficient resources to sustain its own government. The decision was motivated by the Sabor's opinion that the closer alignment with Hungarian interests would be the best defence angainst absolutism. The 1790 decision strengthened the relationship between the two countries, making a move towards a unified state.

== Life ==
=== Family, education and military career ===
Born in Zagreb in Croatia on 20 October 1770, Janko Drašković was the son of Count Ivan VIII Drašković and Eleonora Felicita Malatinski. Janko's early education consisted of tutoring at the family's estates at Brezovica and Rečica in Croatia, and at Csíkszereda in Transylvania (now Miercurea Ciuc, Romania). He moved to the Habsburg capital Vienna to study law and philosophy before enlisting in the military in 1787 as a Fahnenträger ('Ensign') following his father's footsteps. Drašković joined the 37th Hungarian Infantry Regiment. He served at Nagyvárad in Hungary (now Oradea, Romania), and in the Habsburg Kingdom of Galicia, and fought at the 1789 Siege of Belgrade. In late 1792, he was discharged on medical grounds with the rank of Oberleutnant ('Senior Lieutenant'). He rejoined the military, fighting in anti-Napoleonic volunteer units in 1802, 1805 (in the Dalmatian theatre of the War of the Third Coalition), and 1809–1811, ultimately becoming a Colonel and thus matching his father's rank.

Drašković married twice, and his two wives belonged to the Croatian nobility. First, in 1794, he married Cecilija Pogledić who died childless in 1808. His second wife Franjica Kulmer gave birth to their only son Josip who died in his youth, leaving no issue. By the time of his second marriage, he had sold his Transylvanian estates and Brezovica, and settled in Rečica.

=== Political career until 1830 ===
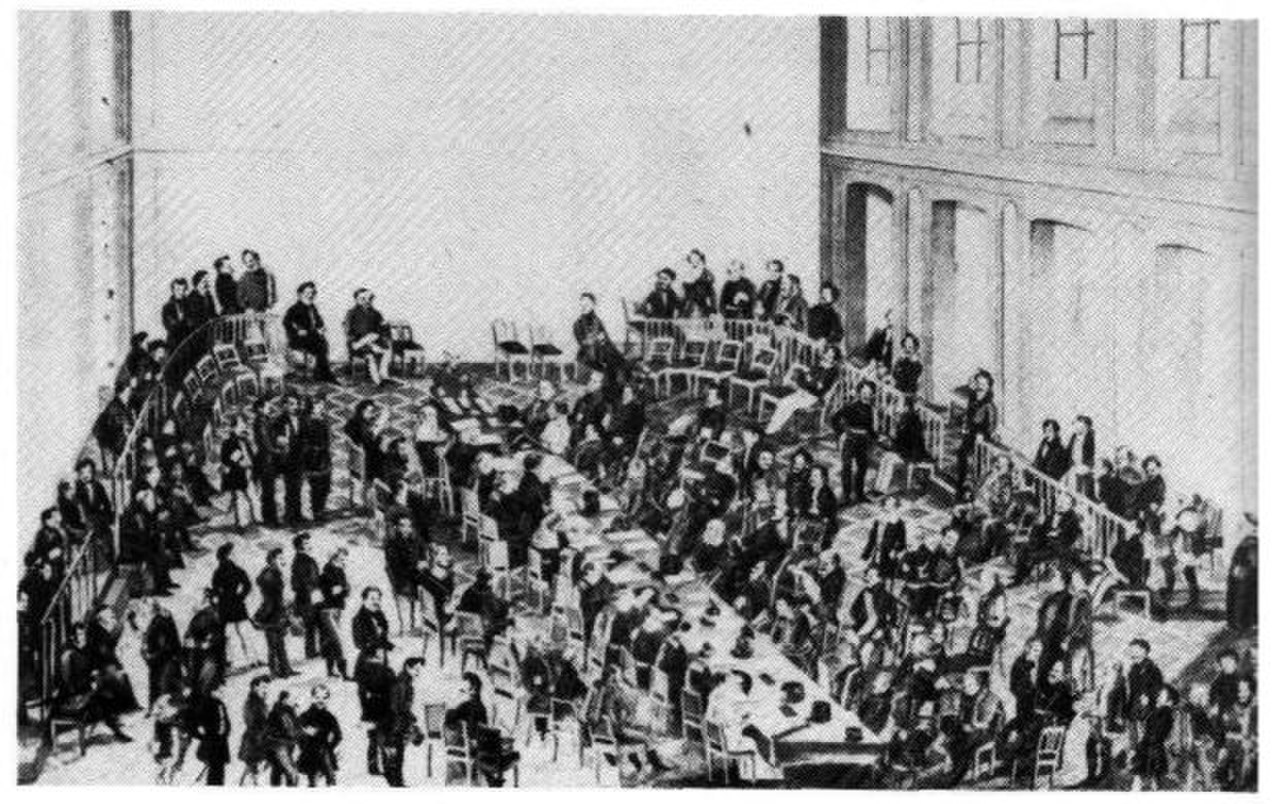
Diet of Hungary of 1830

Drašković became involved in politics in 1792, as a member of the Sabor for the first time. Shortly after entering the Sabor, Drašković was elected as the Croatian delegate to the House of Magnates—the upper house of the Diet of Hungary—in Pozsony (Bratislava, Slovakia). Drašković, and the two Croatian delegates to the Lower House of the Hungarian Diet, Herman Bužan and Antun Kukuljević Sakcinski, were tasked with representing Croatia's views on several issues, especially with emphasizing the temporary nature of the 1790 decision on the Lieutenancy Council, and advocating the union of the Habsburg realm of Dalmatia, the Croatian Military Frontier and the Free City of Rijeka with Croatia. The delegates were also instructed to resist any attempt to replace Latin with Hungarian as official language.

While supporting political reforms and economic modernisation, Drašković advocated a gradual approach like Count István Széchenyi, the leader of the moderate faction of the Hungarian national movement, regarding the political evolution in the United Kingdom as an example. He wanted to strengthen the Croatian economy through the development of the Port of Rijeka and educational reforms. With the educational reforms, he also wanted to resist Magyarisation, demanded by the Hungarian nobility. When the Hungarian Diet was reconvened in 1825, in addition to his seat in the Croatian Sabor, Drašković was again elected as a delegate to the Hungarian Diet. In 1827, the Hungarian Diet decided to introduce the Hungarian language as a mandatory part of the school curriculum in Croatia starting in 1833. In response, the Croatian delegates spoke of the decision as a Hungarian attack against Croatian rights, and the first step of the introduction of Hungarian as the official language in Croatia.

In response to the policies aimed at centralisation of the Lands of the Crown of Saint Stephen and Magyarisation of Croatia, the Croatian national movement emerged among nobility and the more wealthy bourgeoisie in the first half of the 19th century. The conflict was presented by the proponents of the Croatian national movement as the struggle to preserve limited political rights—largely municipal rights—against Austrian and especially Hungarian efforts to curb or abolish them and gave rise to the concept of the Croatian state right. The Croatian state right was the legal foundation for the claim that the Croats as a political nation were the bearers of sovereignty in the former territory of the medieval Croatian kingdom, which was now governed by Habsburg monarchs as the kingdoms of Croatia, Slavonia, and Dalmatia. Unification of the three kingdoms (and subsequently further territories) into the Triune Kingdom, affirmation of the Croatian state right and increased power of the Croatian Sabor became staples of the national movement.

=== Dissertation ===
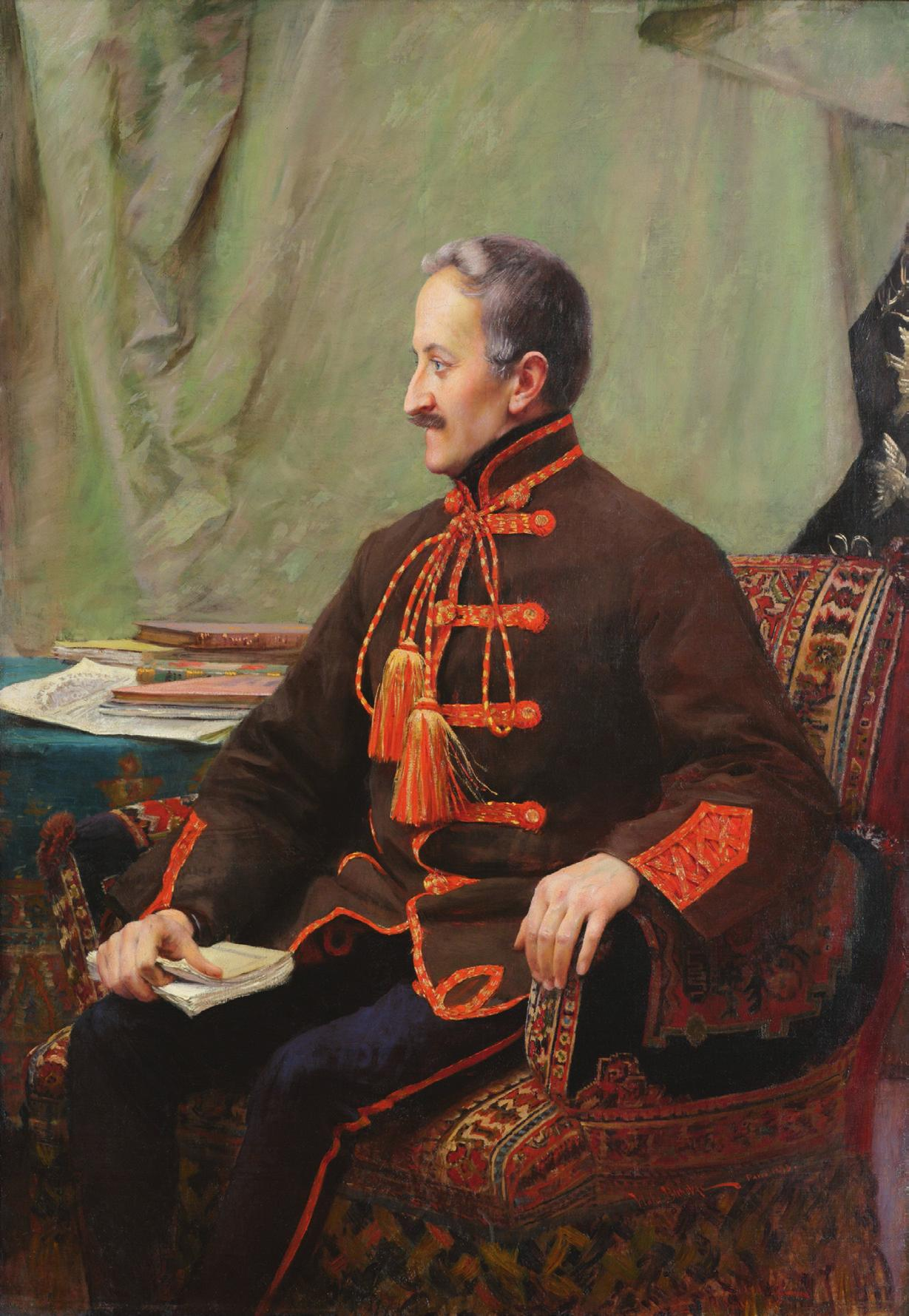
Drašković's portrait by Vlaho Bukovac

In response to the efforts aimed at Magyarisation, a group of young authors known as the Idejna grupa iz Kapucinske ulice (Kapucinska Street Conceptual Group) gained prominence after they were introduced to Drašković through a mutual acquaintance, Ljudevit Vukotinović. Drašković became a patron of the group, which became the core of the Illyrian movement—primarily the Croatian national revival movement. The group was led by Ljudevit Gaj and included Josip Kušević, Pavao Štoos, and Ivan Derkos. In 1832, following his contact with the group, Drašković anonymously published his Dissertation. (Note: Full title: Dissertation, or Treatise, given to the honourable lawful deputies and future legislators of our Kingdoms, delegated to the future Hungarian Diet; by an old patriot of these Kingdoms (Croatian: Disertacija iliti razgovor, darovan gospodi poklisarom zakonskim i budućim zakonotvorcem kraljevinah naših za buduću dietu ungarsku odaslanem, držan po jednom starom domorodcu kraljevinah ovih)) It was the first political, cultural and economic programme of the Croatian national revival. Although it was published anonymously, authorship of the Dissertation was immediately apparent to Drašković's contemporaries.

Dissertation, which was printed in Karlovac by Joan Nepomuk Prettner, was written in the Shtokavian dialect—the most-widely used dialect that was promoted by Gaj— as an instruction to future Croatian delegates to the Hungarian Diet. It examined then-current problems of Croatian lands and provided instructions prepared by Croatian Sabor for its delegation to the 1832 Hungarian Diet—Bužan, Kukuljević Sakcinski, and Drašković. Its instructions were to defend municipal rights of Croatia; the temporary nature of the decision to cede authority to the Hungarian Diet until Croatia has sufficient territory to become self-reliant; and to protect the official status of Latin. The delegates were also directed to petition the king, if they were unsuccessful in the parliament, to grant Croatia the same autonomy as enjoyed by Transylvania. In Dissertation, Drašković stated the first ideas about the standardisation of the Croatian language. He called for a restoration of the authority of the Ban of Croatia, the establishment of an independent government without breaking of constitutional bonds with Hungary, use of the national language as the official language in the lands which would—apart from the Triune Kingdom of Croatia—encompass the demilitarised Military Frontier and later Bosnia and the Slovene Lands bordering Croatia, proposing the territory be called the "Great Illyria" or "Illyric Kingdom". Drašković assumed the imperial authorities in Vienna would support the plan because Francis II, Holy Roman Emperor, had established the Kingdom of Illyria in parts of the Slovene Lands, Istria and Croatia after the French had left the Illyrian Provinces. (Note: Kušević used the term Illyrian in 1830 by in his work De municipalibus iuribus et statutis regnorum Dalmatiae, Croatiae et Slavoniae to refer to a common South Slavic language as "idioma Croatico-Slavico-Illyricum" (Croatian-Slavic-Illyrian language).)

The Sabor accepted Drašković's ideas but they were not universally popular among Croats, and were criticised as feudal and Austro-Slavism incapable of achieving trialism in the monarchy. Croatian nobility and clergy supported the national movement as a means to frustrate Hungarian plans to abolish feudal institutions and grant Protestantism in Croatia status equal to that of Roman Catholicism. The court in Vienna supported Drašković, with some reservations, and refused royal assent to two laws establishing Hungarian as the official language in Croatia the Hungarian Diet passed in the 1830s.

=== Final years ===
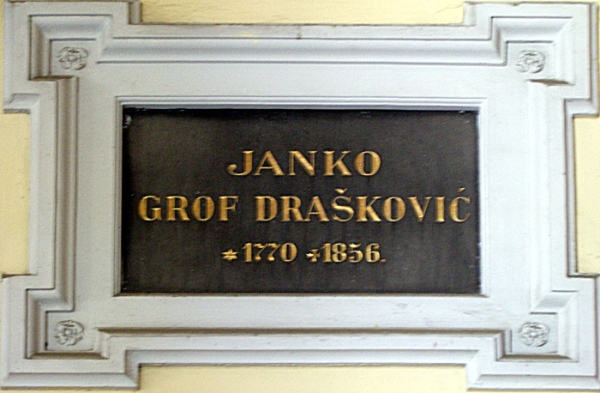
Plaque marking Drašković's tomb at the Mirogoj Cemetery

Drašković devoted his final years to strengthening Croatian national awareness through institutions and by helping Gaj on several occasions. Drašković arranged for Gaj to meet Francis II in 1833, launch his newspaper Novine Horvatske in 1835, and introduced him to politicians at the 1836 diet in Pozsony, where Gaj could promote his ideas. Ferdinand I of Austria recognised Drašković's efforts; he awarded Drašković the Order of Saint Stephen of Hungary in 1836. In 1835 and 1836, Drašković published several poems in Danica ilirska. Like other poetry of the Croatian national revival, they glorify homeland, freedom, and wine while condemning traitors. In 1838, Drašković published Ein Wort an Illyriens hochherzige Töchter, a manifesto aimed at curbing the spread of Germanisation among women of Croatian nobility and attracting them to the Illyrian movement. In the same year, three Illyrian reading rooms (Ilirska čitaonica) were founded – largely due to Drašković's efforts – in Varaždin, Karlovac, and Zagreb. The Illyrian reading room in Zagreb helped speed up cultural and overall development. In 1841, the first political parties in Croatia were established, including the Illyrian Party (later renamed People's Party (Narodna stranka)) which based its programme on the Dissertation. Drašković led the People's Party until 1848 and chaired the sitting of the Sabor, which appointed Josip Jelačić Ban of Croatia.

In 1842, Matica ilirska (later renamed Matica hrvatska), which was tasked with development of Croatian language, was established as a special branch of the Illyrian reading rooms. In his speech at the founding of Matica ilirska, Drašković stated its main purpose was the spreading of science and literacy in the national language, providing youth opportunities for education. He said this mostly meant the publication of good books at affordable prices. Drašković added Matica ilirska should translate useful books published abroad and publish such books. He added the objective should be the improvement of trade and agriculture to ensure appropriate food supply and income for the nation. Drašković served as the first president of Matica hrvatska until 1851. In 1853, Drašković was appointed as an imperial and royal advisor. Drašković died in Bad Radkersburg on 14 January 1856, while he was travelling to Bad Gleichenberg. Since 1893, his remains are buried at the Illyrian Arcade, which is part of Zagreb's Mirogoj Cemetery.

== Legacy ==
In the 21st century, Croatian literary historians predominantly view Drašković as the progenitor and ideologue of the Croatian national revival. He played a key role in representing the Illyrian movement before authorities, nobility, and the general public. The establishment of Matica ilirska is deemed to be Drašković's main achievement. This view was held by late-19th-century Croatian literary historians such as Đuro Šurmin. Poems celebrating Drašković's achievements were written by Antun Nagy and Ljudevit Jelačić during Drašković's lifetime, and posthumously by Dimitrija Demeter, Ivan Mažuranić, and Štoos.

In the 20th century, following the unification of South Slavs in a Yugoslav state, there were different views and nuanced interpretations of Dissertation and Drašković in line with prevailing political views. In 1918, literary historian David Bogdanović wrote of the Dissertation as a monumental blow to Croatian separatism, equating its call for unification with the then-current processes of unification of the South Slavs in a single state, giving greater prominence to Gaj over Drašković in the context of the Illyrian movement. In the mid-1920s, literary historian Branko Vodnik interpreted Drašković's role as that of a political patron of the Illyrians and the Dissertation as the most-progressive Croatian political programme to date. He said Yugoslavist ideas were the basis of the Dissertation with the leading role in the unification intended for Croatia as the South Slavic land with the greatest degree of political rights left intact. During World War II, following the occupation of Yugoslavia and the establishment of Nazi Germany-aligned puppet the Independent State of Croatia, literary historian Slavko Ježić interpreted the Dissertation as a call to unify in the Croatian lands within Austria-Hungary and not in a pan-South-Slavic state. At the same time, Ježić deemed the roles played by Drašković and Gaj equally significant for the Croatian revival. In Communist-ruled Yugoslavia, this view was again reversed by literary historians such as Krešimir Georgijević, who ascribed Drašković a ceremonial role in the Illyrian movement as a member of the feudal class and saw the Dissertation as a feudal manifesto – a view that was congruent with that of the state authorities that Drašković, as any nobility, could at best be portrayed as sympathetic to the French Revolution.

A bust of Drašković is displayed in the entrance lobby of the Croatian Parliament as one of its eight great parliamentarians, along with busts of Jelačić, Mažuranić, Josip Juraj Strossmayer, Eugen Kvaternik, Ante Starčević, Frano Supilo, and Vladimir Nazor. The Croatian State Archives is preserving in its collection works created through Drašković's public activities, as well as a portion of his private and official correspondence.

== Bibliography ==
- Manifestos
  - Disertatia iliti razgovor darovan gospodi poklisarom zakonskim i buduchjem zakonotvorzem kraljevinah nasih: za buduchu dietu ungarsku odaslanem / derxan po jednom Starom Domorodzu [Treatise, given to the honourable lawful deputies and future legislators of our Kingdoms, delegated to the future Hungarian Diet; by an old patriot of these Kingdoms] (in Croatian). Karlovac: Joan Nep. Prettner. 1832. OCLC 9075077789.
  - Ein Wort an Iliriens hochherzige Töchter über die ältere Geschichte und neueste literarische Regeneration Ihres Vaterlandes [One Word to High-Spirited Daughters of Illyria on Ancient History and the Newest Revival of Literature of Their Homeland] (in German). Zagreb: Nat. Typographie Dr. Ljudevit Gaj. 1838. OCLC 247569195.
- Poems
  - Poskočnica (1835)
  - Pěsma domorodska (1835)
  - Napitnica ilirskoj mladeži (1835)
  - Mladeži ilirskoj (1836)

== Sources ==
- Auty, Robert (1978). "Pannonian Parallels and Divergences: Thoughts on the History of the Croatian and Hungarian Literary Languages". Filologija (8). Zagreb: Croatian Academy of Sciences and Arts: 29–35. ISSN 1848-8919.
- Bellamy, Alex J. (2003). The Formation of Croatian National Identity: A Centuries-old Dream. Manchester: Manchester University Press. ISBN 9780719065026.
- Bideleux, Robert; Jeffries, Ian (2006). A History of Eastern Europe: Crisis and Change. Abingdon-on-Thames: Routledge. ISBN 9781134719853.
- Burić, Josip (2017). "Grof Janko Drašković" [Count Janko Drašković]. Pleter: Časopis udruge studenata povijesti (in Croatian). 1 (1). Split: History Students Association "Toma Arhiđakon" - ISHA: 193–202. doi:10.51154/p. ISSN 2459-8623.
- Čorkalo Jemrić, Katica (2007). "Janko Drašković u hrvatskoj književnoj historiografiji" [Janko Drašković in Croatian Litarary Historiography]. Kolo (in Croatian) (3). Matica hrvatska. ISSN 1334-0522.
- Damjanović, Stjepan (2012). "Mjesto gdje se oblikuje prepoznatljiv glas hrvatske kulture" [Place Where Recognisable Voice of Croatian Culture Takes Shape]. Vijenac (in Croatian) (470). Zagreb: Matica hrvatska. ISSN 1333-9249.
- Dobrica, Ladislav (2016). "Ostavština Janka Draškovića u fondu obitelji Drašković u Hrvatskom državnom arhivu" [Legacy of Janko Drašković in Drašković Family Collection in the Croatian State Archives]. Fontes: Izvori Za Hrvatsku Povijest (in Croatian). 22 (1). Zagreb: Croatian State Archives: 9–12. ISSN 1330-6804.
- Dretar, Milivoj (2021). "Intervju s grofom Nikolausom Draskovicem" [Interview With Count Nikolausom Draskovicem]. Podravski zbornik (in Croatian) (47). Koprivnica: Museum of the City of Koprivnica: 231–235. ISSN 0350-3372.
- Goldstein, Ivo (2007) [1999]. Croatia: A History. Translated by Nikolina Jovanović. McGill–Queen's University Press. ISBN 978-0-7735-2017-2.
- Guldescu, Stanko (1970). The Croatian-Slavonian Kingdom, 1526-1792. The Hague: De Gruyter. ISBN 9783110881622.
- Kann, Robert A.; David, Zdeněk (1984). Peoples of the Eastern Habsburg Lands, 1526-1918. Seattle: University of Washington Press. ISBN 9780295806839.
- Kopyś, Tadeusz (2022). "The Crown of St. Stephen as a Symbol of Legal Continuity and Hungarian Constitutionalism (Historical Background)". Krakowskie Studia z Historii Państwa i Prawa. 15 (3). Kraków: Jagiellonian University: 353–367. ISSN 2084-4115.
- Magaš, Branka (2007). Croatia through History: The Making of a European State. SAQI. pp. 188–189. ISBN 978-0-86356-775-9.
- Matić, Davorka (2007). "13: Is Nationalism Really That Bad? The Case of Croatia". In Matić, Davorka; Ramet, Sabrina P. (eds.). Democratic Transition in Croatia – Value Transformation, Education, and Media. College Station: Texas A&M University Press. ISBN 9781603444521.
- Milčetić, Ivan (1907). "Grof Janko Drašković i negova žena Frańica O. Utješenoviću" [Graf Janko Drašković and His Wife Frańica to O. Utješenović]. Građa za povijest književnosti hrvatske (in Serbo-Croatian). 5: 298–299.
- Milković, Kristina (2013). "Kušević, Josip". Croatian Biographical Lexicon (in Croatian). Miroslav Krleža Institute of Lexicography.
- Pederin, Ivan (2012). "Kukuljević kao životopisac i povjesničar hrvatske književnosti" [Kukuljević as Biographer and Historian of Croatian Literature]. Kroatologija: časopis za hrvatsku kulturu (in Croatian). 3 (1). Zagreb: Faculty of Croatian Studies of the University of Zagreb. ISSN 1848-9117.
- Rácz, Szilárd (2017). "Main characteristics of Hungarian-Croatian political relations and Cross-Border Co-operations". Geographica Pannonica. 21 (1). Novi Sad: University of Novi Sad: 54–67. doi:10.5937/geopan1701054r. ISSN 0354-8724.
- Stančić, Nikša (2007). "Disertacija grofa Janka Draškovića iz 1832. godine: samostalnost i cjelovitost Hrvatske, jezik i identitet, kulturna standardizacija i konzervativna modernizacija" [1832 Dissertation of Count Janko Drašković: Independence and Integrity of Croatia, Language and Identity, Cultural Standardisation and Conservative Modernisation]. Kolo (in Croatian) (3). Matica hrvatska. ISSN 1334-0522.
- Szabo, Agneza (2012). "Dragutin Pogledić Kurilovečki u žarištu hrvatske politike i kulture 19. stoljeća" [Dragutin Pogledić Kurilovečki in the Focus of Croatian Politics and Culture of the 19th Century] (PDF). Luč (in Croatian). 1 (1). Velika Gorica: Matica hrvatska, Velika Gorica branch: 39–48. ISSN 1334-627X.
- Szabo, Agneza (2007). "Grof Janko Drašković u doba uspona hrvatske preporodne politike od 1790. do 1848" [Count Janko Drašković in the Age of Ascent of Croatian Renaissance Policy from 1790 to 1848]. Kolo (in Croatian) (3). Matica hrvatska. ISSN 1334-0522.
- Švab, Mladen (1993a). "Drašković, Janko". Croatian Biographical Lexicon (in Croatian). Miroslav Krleža Institute of Lexicography.
- Tanner, Marcus (2010) [1997]. Croatia: A Nation Forged in War (Third ed.). Yale University Press. ISBN 978-0-300-16394-0.
- Švab, Mladen (1993b). "Drašković". Croatian Biographical Lexicon (in Croatian). Miroslav Krleža Institute of Lexicography.
- Trencsényi, Balázs; Kopeček, Michal, eds. (2007). "Janko Drašković: Dissertation, or Treatise". Discourses of collective identity in Central and Southeast Europe (1770–1945). Vol. 2. Budapest: Central European University Press. pp. 339–347. ISBN 978-963-7326-60-8.
- Trifunovska, Snežana (1994). Yugoslavia Through Documents: From Its Creation to Its Dissolution. Leiden: Martinus Nijhoff Publishers. ISBN 9780792326700.
- "Janko Drašković: Disertatia iliti Razgovor darovan gospodi poklisarom" [Janko Drašković: Dissertation, or Treatise, given to the honourable lawful deputies] (in Croatian). Institute of Croatian Language and Linguistics.
- "Velikani Sabora - grof Janko Drašković" [Great Parliamentarians - Count Janko Drašković] (in Croatian). Croatian Parliament.

Cultural offices
Preceded by Office created	President of Matica hrvatska 1842–1851	Succeeded by Ambroz Vranyczany
