= Kulmer =

Kulmer may refer to:

- Ferdinand Kulmer (1925–1998), Croatian abstract painter and teacher
- House of Kulmer, Carinthian nobility with branches in Croatia and Styria
