= Ivan Derkos =

Croatian writer (1808–1834)

- Born: 1808; Vukmanić, Kingdom of Croatia
- Died: 1834 (aged 25–26); Zagreb, Kingdom of Croatia
- Other name: Ioannes Derkoosz
- Education: University of Zagreb
- Occupation: Lawyer

Ivan Derkos (also spelled as Ioannes Derkoosz, 1808 in Vukmanić near Karlovac – 1834 in Zagreb) was a Croatian politician associated with the beginning of the Illyrian movement, the 19th-century Croatian national revival movement. He gained prominence by reading a series of notes written by Fran Kurelac in defence of lectures on the Croatian language held at the University of Zagreb by Matija Smodek in 1832.

Derkos wrote the pamphlet Genius patriae super dormientibus suis filiis in Latin language arguing for cultural and political unification of Habsburg realms of Croatia, Slavonia, and Dalmatia as the Triune Kingdom of Croatia and introduction of the Croatian language in official use. The work is thought of as an integral element of the foundations of the Illyrian movement.

== Early life and education ==
Derkos was born in the village of Vukmanić near the city of Karlovac in the Kingdom of Croatia in 1808. His father was a soldier of the Croatian Military Frontier Slunj-headquartered Regiment N°IV. After education in Karlovac and Zagreb, Derkos graduated from the University of Zagreb law school in 1832 and became a notary public.

== Role in the Illyrian movement ==
Derkos is associated with the beginning of the Illyrian movement, the 19th-century Croatian national revival movement. Specifically, in 1830–1832, he worked with a group assembled around linguist, politician, and writer Ljudevit Gaj to prepare publication of patriotic poetry and newspapers to promote the goals of the national revival. At the time, the Latin language was formally in use as the official language in Croatia. Moreover, 18th-century Croatian patriotic literature was largely confined to writing in the Latin language. In 1830s, there were calls to introduce Hungarian as the official language in all of the Lands of the Crown of Saint Stephen, including Croatia. The position was promoted in the country through anonymously published brochure Aliquid circa linguam hungaricam. This was countered by calls for wider use and teaching of the Croatian language to curb Magyarisation, resulting in occasional physical fighting between students supporting the two opposing camps.

In response to the efforts aimed at Magyarisation, a group of young authors known as the Idejna grupa iz Kapucinske ulice (Kapucinska Street Conceptual Group) gained prominence after they were introduced to Count Janko Drašković, a Croatian politician, member of the Croatian Parliament and the Diet of Hungary, through a mutual acquaintance, Ljudevit Vukotinović. Drašković became a patron of the group, which became the core of the Illyrian movement. The group was led by Gaj and included Josip Kušević, Pavao Štoos, and Derkos.

=== Reading of Kurelac's notes ===
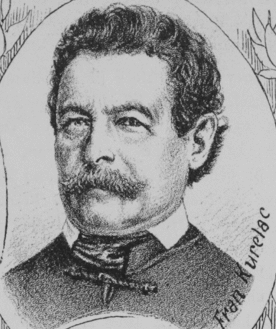
Kurelac (pictured) wrote notes in defence of Smodek's lectures.

Derkos's first public appearance in support of the nascent Illyrian movement was a speech in defence of Croatian language lectures held by Matija Smodek at the University of Zagreb law school in late 1832. The speech consisted of reading of a dozen notes written by Croatian patriotic writer Fran Kurelac, prompted by opposition to Smodek's lectures voiced by ethnic Hungarian students calling on the university to cancel the lectures. Kurelac wrote the notes on individual pieces of paper in Croatian, Latin and German languages and stuck in a University window where they were found by Derkos and few fellow students. The Kurelac's notes were read by Derkos before a group of assembled students. The contents of the notes called for establishment of the single Triune Kingdom of Croatia unifying the Habsburg kingdoms of Croatia, Slavonia, and Dalmatia with the Croatian language in official use. When Derkos read that Croatia might break its constitutional bonds with the Kingdom of Hungary created by the 12th-century personal union as the North and South Americas broke theirs with England and Spain, the event ended in a brawl. The supporters of the ideas put forward by Kurelac and read by Derkos later copied and distributed the notes, sometimes with remarks like evangelium nostrum (meaning our Gospel) added.

=== Genius patriae ===
Derkos is significant for the Croatian national revival because of his analyses of the nature of language and its role in development of overall culture. In 1832, Derkos published Genius patriae super dormientibus suis filiis (Spirit of Homeland Over its Dormant Sons; Croatian: Duh domovine nad spavajućim svojim sinovima). In the pamphlet, Derkos argued that Croatia should be culturally and politically consolidated primarily through linguistic unification, calling for introduction of the Shtokavian dialect as the standard form since it is spoken in the regions of Slavonia and Dalmatia with the aim of merging them with the central Croatia in terms of language. He wrote the work as a polemic arguing against Hungarian claims over Croatia, originally choosing to write the pamphlet in Hungarian before switching to Latin, as well as countering a thesis put forward by Pavel Jozef Šafárik dividing the area Derkos saw as the future Triune Kingdom into areas where Slovene and Serbian are spoken. In the work, Derkos wrote of language as the true homeland echoing philosophical positions of Wilhelm von Humboldt and Hugo Grotius formulated in the 18th century. Derkos argues that the proposed Triune Kingdom has retained its Croatian state right and constitution reflected in unbroken existence of municipal rights and freely chosen to form a union with Hungary and the Habsburg monarchy. In the pamphlet, Derkos also discussed the meaning of patriotism, defining it as the voluntary performance of legal and ethical duties to the homeland based on joy for its well-being. He further distinguished general patriotism owed to the Habsburg monarchy, particular patriotism towards the union with Hungarym and personal patriotism towards Croatia. The work is an integral part of the programme of the Illyrian movement.

Derkos died in Zagreb in 1834.

== Sources ==
- Bogišić, Rafo (1996). "Polilingvizam u hrvatskoj književnosti 18. stoljeća" [Polylingualism in 18th-Century Croatian Literature]. Dani Hvarskoga kazališta: Građa i rasprave o hrvatskoj književnosti i kazalištu (in Croatian). 22 (1). Split: Croatian Academy of Sciences and Arts & Split Literary Circle: 5–19. ISSN 1849-0255.
- Burić, Josip (2017). "Grof Janko Drašković" [Count Janko Drašković]. Pleter: Časopis udruge studenata povijesti (in Croatian). 1 (1). Split: History Students Association "Toma Arhiđakon" - ISHA: 193–202. doi:10.51154/p. ISSN 2459-8623.
- Kann, Robert A.; David, Zdeněk (1984). Peoples of the Eastern Habsburg Lands, 1526-1918. Seattle: University of Washington Press. ISBN 9780295806839.
- Korunić, Petar; Stipčević-Despotović, Anđelka (1993). "Derkos, Ivan (Derkoosz, Ioannes)". Hrvatski biografski leksikon (in Croatian). Miroslav Krleža Institute of Lexicography.
- Kuvač-Levačić, Kornelija (2019). "Josip Bratulić o hrvatskoj književnosti i kulturi 19. stoljeća" [Josip Bratulić on Croatian Literature and Culture of the 19th Century]. Croatica et Slavica Iadertina (in Croatian). 15 (2). Zadar: University of Zadar, Croatian Studies Department: 632–638. doi:10.15291/csi. ISSN 1849-0131.
- Moguš, Milan (1996). "O govoru Ivana Kukuljevića Sakcinskoga na hrvatskom jeziku u Hrvatskom saboru" [On the Speech of Ivan Kukuljević Sakcinski in the Croatian parliament]. Croatica: časopis za hrvatski jezik, književnost i kulturu (in Croatian). 26 (42–44). Zagreb: Faculty of Humanities and Social Sciences, University of Zagreb: 281–287. ISSN 2623-9280.
- Nosić, Vesna (2011). "Hrvatski narodni preporod u svjetlu tiskarsko-izdavačke djelatnosti" [Croatian National Renaissance in the Light of the Printing and Publishing Activity]. Život i škola: časopis za teoriju i praksu odgoja i obrazovanja (in Croatian). 57 (25). Osijek: University of Osijek, Faculty of Education: 133–152. doi:10.32903/zs. ISSN 1849-0972.
- Pederin, Ivan (2013). "Promegomena ad Biographiam Croaticam (u Viencu do Šenoine smrti)" [Promegomena ad Biographiam Croaticam (Vienac up to Šenoa's Death)]. Croatica et Slavica Iadertina (in Croatian). 9/1 (9). Zadar: University of Zadar, Croatian Studies Department: 145–184. doi:10.15291/csi. ISSN 1849-0131.
- Schiffler, Ljerka (1997). "Filozofski aspekti hrvatskog dopreporodnog razdoblja" [Phylosophical Aspects of the Period Leading to the Croatian National Revival]. Dani Hvarskoga kazališta: Građa i rasprave o hrvatskoj književnosti i kazalištu (in Croatian). 23 (1). Split: Croatian Academy of Sciences and Arts & Split Literary Circle: 77–100. ISSN 1849-0255.
- Schiffler, Ljerka (1998). "Idejno-misaone smjernice razdoblja hrvatskog narodnog preporoda" [Conceptual Guidelines of the Croatian National Revival Period]. Dani Hvarskoga kazališta: Građa i rasprave o hrvatskoj književnosti i kazalištu (in Croatian). 24 (1). Split: Croatian Academy of Sciences and Arts & Split Literary Circle: 77–100. ISSN 1849-0255.
- Stančić, Nikša (2008). "Hrvatski narodni preporod - ciljevi i ostvarenja" [Croatian National Revival - Goals and Achievements]. Cris: Časopis Povijesnog društva Križevci (in Croatian). X (1). Križevci: Povijesno društvo Križevci: 6–17. ISSN 1848-9621.
- Šicel, Miroslav (1997). "Pretpreporodni programski nagovještaji ilirskog pokreta" [Pre-Revivalist Programmatic Indications of the Illyrian Movement]. Dani Hvarskoga kazališta: Građa i rasprave o hrvatskoj književnosti i kazalištu (in Croatian). 23 (1). Split: Croatian Academy of Sciences and Arts & Split Literary Circle: 25–34. ISSN 1849-0255.
- Šidak, Jaroslav (1969). "Studentski pokret do otvaranja sveučilišta" [Student Movement Before Opening of the University] (PDF). In Šidak, Jaroslav (ed.). Spomenica u povodu proslave 300-godišnjice Sveučilišta u Zagrebu [Memorial on the Occasion of Celebration of the 300th Anniversary of the University of Zagreb] (in Croatian). Vol. 1. University of Zagreb. pp. 437–450.
- Tvrtković, Tamara (2018). "Latinistički top-ten ili deset iznenađujućih činjenica o hrvatskim latinistima" [Latinist Top-Ten or Ten Surprising Facts about Croatian Latinists]. Latina et Graeca (in Croatian). 2 (33). Zagreb: Institut za klasične jezike i antičku civilizaciju Latina et Graeca: 89–98. ISSN 2718-2843.
