= Herman Bužan =

Croatian politician (1800–1862)

- Born: 8 October 1800; Varaždin, Croatia, Kingdom of Hungary
- Died: 22 September 1862 (aged 61); Črešnjevec near Tuhelj, Croatia, Austrian Empire
- Other name: Hermanus Busan
- Occupation: Politician

Herman Bužan (also spelled Hermanus Busan, 8 October 1800 – 22 September 1862) was a Croatian politician born in Varaždin. He studied philosophy and law at the University of Zagreb and the University of Pozsony before becoming a notary of the Zagreb County in 1831. The next year, the Croatian Sabor appointed Bužan one of its delegates to the Diet of Hungary convened in Pozsony, along with Count Janko Drašković and Antun Kukuljević Sakcinski. The three delegates were instructed to defend municipal rights of Croatia, the temporary nature of the decision to cede authority to the Hungarian Diet until Croatia has sufficient territory to become self-reliant and to protect the official status of Latin language. Finally, the delegates were to petition the king, if they were unsuccessful in the parliament, to grant Croatia the same autonomy in decision-making as enjoyed by Transylvania. Bužan advocated keeping Latin as the official language as defence of its state rights rather than defence of an extinct language, winning support of the Sabor on the issue. In 1835, 1839, and 1843, Bužan was reelected as a delegate to the Hungarian Diet where he spoke in defence of the Illyrian movement – the Croatian national revival movement. He was appointed to was appointed to sit at the Royal Court Table in Zagreb on behalf of the Zagreb County in 1841, later presiding over the body since 1846. Following an appeal issued by Ban of Croatia Josip Jelačić for contributions to help raise an army few months into the Hungarian Revolution of 1848, Bužan was the first in the Sabor make a donation – by giving 300 forints. Later that year, Jelačić tasked Bužan, together with Josip Bunjevac, with securing control over the city of Rijeka for Croatia. In 1850, following introduction of the Bach's absolutism, Bužan was appointed an advisor at the Supreme Court of Cassation (Oberster Gerichts- und Kassationshof) in Vienna. He was retired in 1862 and, later that year, he died in Črešnjevec near Tuhelj.
