= Ksaver Šandor Gjalski =

Croatian writer (1854–1935)

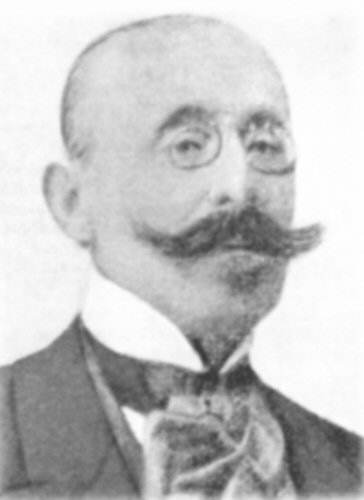
- Born: Ljubomil Tito Josip Franjo Babić; 26 October 1854; Gredice, Kingdom of Croatia, Austrian Empire (now Gredice, Croatia)
- Died: 6 February 1935 (aged 80); Gredice, Kingdom of Serbs, Croats, and Slovenes (now Gredice, Croatia)
- Occupations: novelist, civil servant
- Spouse: Vilma Gönner
- Writing career
- Language: Croatian
- Notable work: Under Old Roofs

Ljubomil Tito Josip Franjo Babić, better known by his pen name Ksaver Šandor Gjalski, (also cited as Đalski, both pronounced [d͡ʑǎlskiː]; 26 October 1854 – 6 February 1935) was a Croatian novelist and civil servant.

== Biography ==
He was born in Gredice near Zabok in Hrvatsko Zagorje into a minor aristocratic family. His father Tito was a feudal lord and lawyer who served as a representative in Sabor and was a strong supporter of the Croatian national revival. His mother Helena was the daughter of Franjo Ksaver Šandor Gjalski, also a feudal lord and lawyer, from whom Ljubomil took his pen name in 1884. His mother was also a relative of the Croatian poet Antun Mihanović. He finished gymnasium in Varaždin in 1871 and went on to study law in Zagreb between 1871 and 1873 before finishing his studies in Vienna in 1876, before finally passing the national exam in 1878. In 1880, he moved to Virovitica, where he met his future wife, Vilma Gönner, a teacher at the local girls' school. He served the royal government in Zagreb between 1891 and 1898, but, due to disagreements with the Khuen government, returned to Gredice.

Gjalski, however, remained involved in politics. In 1906, he was elected into the Sabor, aligning himself with the Croat-Serb Coalition. From 1917 to 1918, he held the post of župan of the Zagreb County. Between 1919 and 1920, he served as a member of the Provisional National Representation in the newly formed Kingdom of Yugoslavia in Belgrade, retiring at the end of 1920. He served twice as the president of the Croatian Writers' Association (1909-1918, 1926)

Gjalski wrote many novels, but his best known work is Under Old Roofs (Croatian: Pod starim krovovima), a collection of short stories in which he described the economic decline of the Croatian aristocracy. His writings were heavily inspired by Turgenev and Šenoa, as well as realism and romanticism in general.

== Major works ==
- In the New Castle (Croatian: U novom dvoru, 1885)
- Under Old Roofs (Croatian: Pod starim krovovima, 1886)
- At Night (Croatian: U noći, 1887)
- Janko Borislavić (1887)
- Đurđica Agićeva (1889)
- Na rođenoj grudi (1890)
- Dawn (Croatian: Osvit, 1892)
- Radmilović (1894)
- For the Maternal Word (Croatian: Za materinsku rieč, 1902)
- Arrival of the Croats (Croatian: Dolazak Hrvata, 1924)
- Misappropriated Ideals (Croatian: Pronevjereni ideali, 1925)

== See also ==
- House of Kušević – Croatian nobility Gjalski was related to
