= Milan Kušević =

Croatian officer (1807–1887)

Baron Milan Kušević Emil Kussevich
- Born: 9 September 1807; Zagreb, Kingdom of Croatia
- Died: 23 June 1887 (aged 79); Graz, Austria-Hungary
- Alma mater: Imperial and Royal Technical Military Academy
- Military career
- Allegiance: Austrian Empire
- Rank: General of the Artillery
- Commands: 27th Infantry Regiment
- Conflicts: Revolution of 1848–1849
- Awards: Order of Leopold

Milan Kušević (also spelled Emil Kussevich, 9 September 1807 – 23 June 1887) was an officer of the Imperial Austrian Army. He was a member of the Croatian nobility, specifically the House of Kušević. His father was Josip Kušević.

Kušević graduated from the Imperial and Royal Technical Military Academy in Vienna in 1825 and served in the 1st Engineering Regiment as a cadet. He was promoted to the rank of the second lieutenant in 1826, and an Oberleutnant in 1830. Kušević served in the 7th Brod Grenzer regiment from 1831. The next year, he was promoted to captain and transferred to the 53rd Hungarian Line Infantry Regiment. He was promoted to the rank of major in 1843. In 1846, Kušević transferred to the 2nd Grenzer Regiment of the Ban of Croatia in the rank of lieutenant colonel. Next he commanded the 27th Infantry Regiment in the rank of colonel, taking part in the suppression of the Revolution of 1848–1849 in the Hungarian region of Banat, earning the rank of major general. Kušević was appointed a member of the judicial council of the Austria's Supreme Military Court in 1850–1851. In 1852–1855, he was assigned to the 10th Army Corps and in 1856 he assumed command of a division headquartered in Zagreb. A year later, he was the second in command of forces in Croatia and Slavonia. In 1857, he became the Inhaber of the 77th Infantry Regiment, taking command based in Udine. In 1863, he received the Order of Leopold and the title of baron of Samobor a year later. In 1865, Kušević was appointed the Chancellor at the Croatian Court Chancellery as the last person to hold the position. His policies contributed to removal of the Ban of Croatia Josip Šokčević from the post of Ban of Croatia. In 1869, he was promoted to the rank of the general of the artillery, before retirement. He was subsequently appointed colonel, Inhaber of the 33rd Line Infantry Regiment.

== Sources ==
- Leskovec, Vlatka; Majnarić, Ivan (2013). "Kušević, Milan". Croatian Biographical Lexicon (in Croatian). Miroslav Krleža Institute of Lexicography.
- Pongrac, Tin (2013). "Kušević". Croatian Biographical Lexicon (in Croatian). Miroslav Krleža Institute of Lexicography.
