= Antun Kukuljević Sakcinski =

Croatian politician (1776–1851)

- Born: 10 May 1776; Varaždin, Croatia, Kingdom of Hungary
- Died: 28 August 1851 (aged 75) area of Varaždinske Toplice, Croatia, Austrian Empire
- Occupation: Politician
- Children: Ivan Kukuljević Sakcinski

Antun Kukuljević Sakcinski (10 May 1776 – 28 August 1851) was a Croatian lawyer, judge and deputy county prefect before being appointed to sit at the Royal Court Table from 1831 to 1850. Kukuljević Sakcinski was a member of the Croatian Sabor and one of Croatian appointed delegates to the Diet of Hungary sittings in 1825 and 1832–1836.

== Biography ==
Antun Kukuljević Sakcinski was born in Varaždin, Croatia, Kingdom of Hungary on 10 May 1776. He studied philosophy at the University of Zagreb and law at the University of Pozsony and started a legal and civil service career in 1795 becoming a judge. In 1817, Kukuljević Sakcinski inherited a portion of the former Pethő de Gerse family estate in Varaždin area. This was the result of a 54 year of litigation seeking the return of the land bought by the family from king John Corvinus. The estate was seized and sold by a royal decree to Count Ladislav Erdődy, a member of the family of perpetual counts of Varaždin County.

In 1818, Kukuljević Sakcinski became the deputy county prefect of Varaždin County and held the function until 1831. Subsequently, he was appointed a member of the Royal Court Table (first-instance and appellate court) from 1831 to 1850. A year after his appointment to the Royal Court Table, Kukuljević Sakcinski was also elected to the Croatian Sabor, which in turn elected him as one of its delegates to the Diet of Hungary held in 1825 and again in 1832–1836. He and two other delegates – Count Janko Drašković and Herman Bužan – were instructed to defend municipal rights of Croatia, the temporary nature of the decision to cede authority to the Hungarian Diet until Croatia has sufficient territory to become self-reliant and to protect the official status of Latin language in Croatia. Finally, the delegates were to petition the king, if they were unsuccessful in the parliament, to grant Croatia the same autonomy in decision-making as enjoyed by Transylvania.

In the two parliaments, he opposed Magyarisation of Croatia, particularly contesting proposals to introduce Hungarian language as the official language of Croatia. Kukuljević Sakcinski was appointed the arch-principal of all schools in Croatia and Slavonia in 1837. He used the position to obstruct decisions of the Diet of Hungary on introduction of Hungarian language as a mandatory teaching subject. This contributed to the decision by the authorities to force him to retire in 1843. In the period from 1836 to 1846, Kukuljević Sakcinski was the president of the Croatian Music Institute.

After his wife's death, Kukuljević Sakcinski sold off all his estates in Ivanec, Jurketinec and Cerje, retaining only the Tonimir manor house near Varaždinske Toplice which he had built for himself and his son Ivan. He died in the manor house on 28 August 1851.
