= House of Kulmer =

Croatian and Austrian noble family

Kulmer
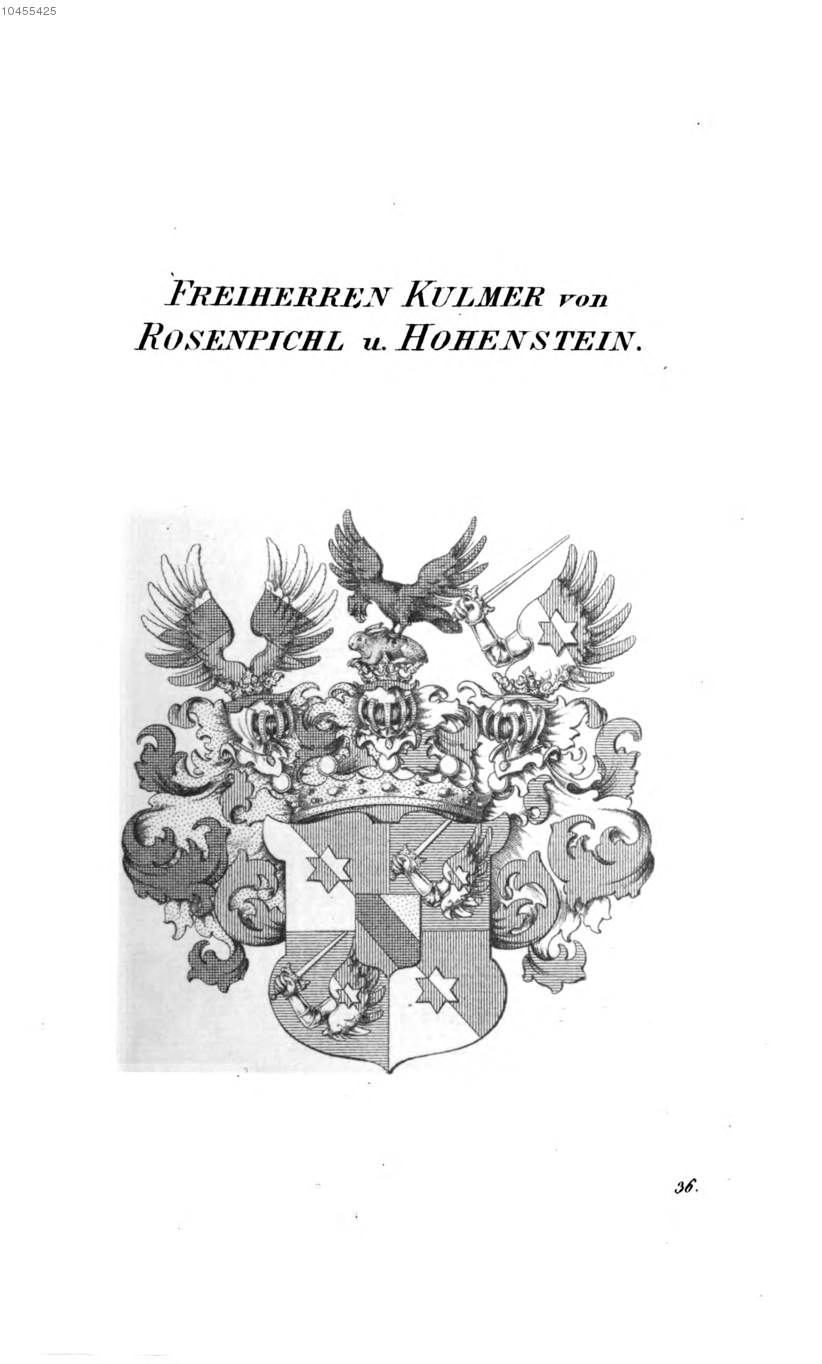
- Kulmer coat of arms
- Country: Duchy of Carinthia; Duchy of Styria; Kingdom of Croatia
- Titles: Baron (since 1654); Count (since 1860)

The Kulmer family is a noble family originating in the Duchy of Carinthia. The family ancestry is traced back to the 14th century under names of Kulmer and von Münzenbach. Georg Kulmer (?–1567) had the Rosenbichl Castle built near Klagenfurt, while his brother Hermann Kulmer (?–1546) built the Hohenstein Castle near Sankt Veit an der Glan. Johann Balthasar Kulmer (?–1683) was awarded the title of baron in 1654 and the title of von Rosenpichl und Hohenstein. His three sons, Georg Ferdinand (1638–1706), Christoph Andreas, and Ferdinand Ernst are deemed the progenitors of the Carinthian, Styrian and Croatian branches of the family respectively.

== Croatian branch ==
The most notable members of the Croatian branch of the House of Kulmer:
- Ferdinand Ernst Kulmer (1667–1736), the founder of the Croatian branch of the House of Kulmer pursued a military career since 1691 and took part in the War of the Spanish Succession. In the rank of the cavalry major and held command of captaincies in Turanj (from 1708) and in Križanić near Karlovac (from 1710). He commanded the Žumberak captaincy (from 1727) until retirement with the rank of a colonel in 1736.
  - Ivan Josip Kulmer (1702–1769), Ferdinand Ernst's son, married Regina Patačić (from the House of Patačić). Through the marriage, he obtained the Orehovica Manor (near Bedekovčina), as well as further possessions in Lepa Ves and Brdovec in the region of Hrvatsko Zagorje.
    - Ivan Emilijan Kulmer (also Emil Kulmer, 1736–1807), Ivan Josip's son, served in the Nádasdy hussar regiment reaching the rank of a major. He married Judita Sermage (from the House of Sermage) in 1775 and they had sons Ferdinand and Ivan Nepomuk, and daughters Josupa, Franjica and Vilhelmina. Ivan Emilijan received the Medvedgrad Fortress and the Kulmerovi dvori manor in Šestine near Zagreb through the marriage. The property was associated with patronage of the local church of St. Emeric where the family burials subsequently took place. Ivan Emilijan also acquired the Samobor Castle with attached estate and the (subsequently rebuilt) Balagovi dvori manor in Bregana, and the Januševec Manor. He had further land and properties in Vivodina near Ozalj, as well as iron ore mines and smelting plants in Bregana and in Bliznec near Gračani (present-day part of Zagreb). He supported the school in Samobor and construction of the Church of Assumption of the Virgin Mary in Stenjevec where he was subsequently buried. Ivan Emilijan rebuilt the fire-damaged Sermage-Kulmer Palace on the St. Mark's Square in Zagreb. The building was sold to the state by his son Ferdinand and it became the official seat of the Ban of Croatia (and subsequently the seat of the Government of Croatia) known as the Banski Dvori. Ivan Emilijan also pursued politics as a member of a committee tasked with the Croatian Sabor with drafting of instructions for Sabor's delegation to the 1805 Diet of Hungary. He wrote the Die Grafen Weimar play which premiered in the Amadeo's theatre, a part of the Pejačević-Kulmer Palace Ivan Emilijan owned in 1803–1807.
      - Ferdinand Kulmer (1776–1816), a son of Ivan Emilijan served in the 2nd Ban's Frontier Regiment in the Croatian Military Frontier and achieved the rank of a captain. He retired from the army in 1807 and was commissioned in 1809 to collect intelligence on the Grande Armée during the Napoleonic Wars and appointed the Imperial chamberlain after the war for his services. Through the marriage to Josipa Oršić (from the House of Oršić), he acquired two palaces in the Gornji Grad part of Zagreb (present-day sites of the Croatian History Museum and the Museum of Broken Relationships). They had sons Franjo, Miroslav and Emil and daughter Klotilda.
        - Franjo Kulmer (also Franz Kulmer, 1806–1853), a son of Ferdinand, was a politician who attended the Theresianum and graduated law from the University of Vienna before starting a career in government administration. In 1831, he was a part of the commission tasked with quelling of the 1831 Slovak Peasant Uprising, one of cholera riots. He was appointed an associate at the Tabula Banalis appellate court in Zagreb. He joined the Illyrian movement and the People's Party in 1842. In his political work, he advocated cultural and linguistic autonomy of Croatia while calling for greater political cooperation with conservative political groups in Hungary. In 1847, Franjo was appointed the comes (head) of the Syrmia County. He successfully lobbied for appointment of Josip Jelačić to the position of the Ban of Croatia in 1848. He was a minister without portfolio in the government of Prince Felix of Schwarzenberg.
        - Miroslav Kulmer (also Friedrich Kulmer and Friderik Kulmer, 1814–1877), a son of Ferdinand, graduated from military schools in Maribor and Karlovac. He served with the 43rd Lombardian Infantry Regiment from 1831 to 1842 achieving the rank of an oberleutnant. Then he transferred to the 4th Slunj and then the 3rd Ogulin regiments in the Croatian Military Frontier in the rank of the captain and major respectively. He took part in the First Italian War of Independence, including the Battle of Custoza. During the Hungarian Revolution, he was the commander of the city of Nagykanizsa in the rank of a brigadier. In 1850, he transferred to the 7th Brod Frontier Regiment as a lieutenant colonel, and in 1854 back to the 3rd Ogulin Regiment as a colonel shortly before retirement. He received the title of a count in 1860. In 1869, Miroslav was reactivated as the first commander of the Royal Croatian Home Guard. Before his final retirement in 1875, he was promoted to the rank of a major general. He is credited with commissioning Bogoslav Šulek's translation of military manuals into Croatian language. He was a member of the Croatian Sabor and a member of the Economic Committee for Establishment of the Yugoslav Academy of Sciences and Arts. Miroslav married Aleksandrina Erdődy (of the House of Erdődy) and they had sons Ljudevit, Miroslav and Milan.
          - Ljudevit Kulmer (1855–1933), son of Miroslav was a politician and a philanthropist. He was a member of the Croatian Sabor elected on the People's Party ticket, representing the city of Krapina in 1901–1906. He bought the Kulmer Manor (Popovec Manor) near Krapina in 1890, and the Dioš Manor near Daruvar in 1917. He had sons Franjo and Ivan.
            - Franjo Kulmer (also Cyrill Kulmer, 1885–1960), a son of Ljudevit, was the comes (head) of the Varaždin County in 1918–1920.
            - Ivan Kulmer (1888–1956), a son of Ljudevit, inherited the Popovac Manor near Krapina and sold off most of the estate.
          - Milan Kulmer (also Emil Kulmer, 1862–1941), a son of Miroslav, was Austro-Hungarian naval officer. He bought land near Zabok in 1887 and had the Bračak-Kulmer Manor built there. He married Beata Türk and they had sons Miroslav (1888–1943) who acquired the Erdődy (Moslavina) Manor in Popovača briefly in 1917, and Aleksandar.
            - Aleksandar Kulmer (1890–1964) was a lawyer, writer, and researcher of heraldry and genealogy of the Kulmer family. In 1917, he purchased the Cernik Manor in the village of Cernik near Nova Gradiška. He owned a large archive (a part of it is donated to the Archive of the Croatian Academy of Sciences and Arts), and collections of seals, drawings, photographs and postcards of Croatian castles and manors (donated later to the Croatian History Museum). In 1932, he published a book on history of Cernik. Aleksandar was a Knight of the Sovereign Military Order of Malta.
              - Ferdinand Kulmer (1925–1998), son of Aleksandar, was a Croatian artist. He studied fine arts at the Hungarian University of Fine Arts and the Zagreb Academy of Fine Arts, subsequently teaching at the latter until his retirement in 1990. The following year, he became the regular member of the Croatian Academy of Sciences and Arts. He was the final male descendant of the Croatian branch of the Kulmer family.
          - Miroslav Kulmer (also Friedrich, Fridrih, or Fritz; 1860–1943) a son of Miroslav was a politician who graduated law from the University of Vienna in 1882, elected member of the Croatian Sabor in 1884–1892 and 1906–1918. At first independent member of the Sabor, then a member of the Sabor Centre Party in 1887 before switching to the Independent People's Party the next year. He temporarily left politics in 1892 before successfully running again for the Croatian Sabor on the Croat-Serb Coalition ticket fourteen years later. He was a member of the National Council of the short-lived State of Slovenes, Croats and Serbs established upon break-up of Austria-Hungary in 1918, and a member of the Temporary National Representation of the newly proclaimed Kingdom of Serbs, Croats and Slovenes in 1919–1920. Following the 1925 financial crash of the Croatian-Slavonian Economic Society under his presidency, Miroslav undertook to provide compensation to its investors from his personal property. He financed this by selling the land owned in the present-day Donji Grad area of Zagreb, allowing a southward expansion of the city to the Sava River. He was the vice-governor of the National Bank of Yugoslavia in 1931. In 1942, he accepted the invitation to take part in the Croatian Sabor convened by the Nazi-puppet state of the Independent State of Croatia.
      - Ivan Nepomuk Kulmer (1782–1835), a son of Ivan Emilijan, inherited the Januševec Manor and an estate in Savski Marof. Attained doctoral degrees in the public law and in the political economy at the Royal Academy of Sciences in Zagreb in 1801 and 1803 respectively.
      - Josipa Kulmer (also Jozefina Kulmer, 1786–1876, married Baltazar Ignjat Kiepach), Franjica Kulmer (1788–1846, married Count Janko Drašković) and Vilhelmina Kulmer (also Wilhelmina Kulmer, 1790–1872), daughters of Ivan Emilijan, inherited the property in Samobor and took up philanthropic work supporting establishment of a school for girls in Samobor and supporting the Croatian national revival Illyrian movement institutions. The Samobor estates ultimately passed on to Josipa and her descendants.

== Styrian branch ==
Christoph Andreas Freiherr von Kulmer is deemed the founder of the Styrian branch of the Kulmer family. He married Judith von Staudach and was succeeded as the head of the family branch by his son Georg Heinrich (?–1670). He was succeeded by his son Wolfgang Andreas (1658–1719).

Otto Herbert (1688–1746) of the Styrian branch had possessions in Croatia, and his son Ferdinand was a captain in the Petrinja Regiment in the Croatian Military Frontier and served as an adjutant to the Ban of Croatia Franz Leopold von Nádasdy.

In mid-18th century, the head of the branch was Emerich who married Johanna von Rechbach had sons Johann Nepomuk (1763–1796, killed in the Battle of Castiglione), Franz Xaver (1760–1793, killed in the French Revolutionary Wars near Tirlemont), and major general Ferdinand (1763–?). Ferdinand's son Ignaz (1798–1861) married Countess Josepha von Kuenburg and pursued judicial career in Split (Habsburg realm of Dalmatia) and Graz where he was the president of the regional court. Ignaz had two daughters—Johanna Nepomucena and Teheresia Maria in 1837 and 1847 respectively. Johann Nepomuk was succeeded as the head of the Styrian branch of the Kulmer family by Karl (1812–?) who remained in that position until at least 1865.

== Carinthian branch ==
The Carinthian branch of the family became extinct in 1809 when Amadeus Freiherr von Kulmer died.

== See also ==
- List of noble families of Croatia
- List of titled noble families in the Kingdom of Hungary

== Sources ==
- Karbić, Marija (2013). "Kulmer". Croatian Biographical Lexicon (in Croatian). Miroslav Krleža Institute of Lexicography.
- Kukić, Boris (2013). "Kulmer, Miroslav ml. (Friedrich, Fridrih, Fritz)". Croatian Biographical Lexicon (in Croatian). Miroslav Krleža Institute of Lexicography.
- Leitner, Friedrich Wilhelm (2001). "Das Epitaph der Kulmer-Staudach im Landesmuseum". Rudolfinum. Jahrbuch des Landesmuseums für Kärnten (in German). 2: 143–157.
- Leskovec, Vlatka; Kukić, Boris (2013). "Kulmer, Miroslav st. (Friedrich, Friderik)". Croatian Biographical Lexicon (in Croatian). Miroslav Krleža Institute of Lexicography.
- Milković, Kristina (2013). "Kulmer, Franjo (Franz)". Croatian Biographical Lexicon (in Croatian). Miroslav Krleža Institute of Lexicography.
- Tomić, Darja (2013). "Kulmer, Ferdinand". Croatian Biographical Lexicon (in Croatian). Miroslav Krleža Institute of Lexicography.
- Wurzbach, Constantin von (1865). "BLKÖ:Kulmer, die Freiherren und Grafen, Genealogie" . 13 Biographisches Lexikon des Kaisertums Österreich - Dreizehnter Teil - Kosarek - Lagkner (in German). Universitätsbibliothek Graz. pp. 359–362 – via Wikisource.
