= Trpimir Macan =

Croatian historian and lexicographer (born 1935)

Trpimir Macan (born 20 August 1935) is a Croatian historian and lexicographer.

He was born in Dubrovnik. He studied history in Zagreb and Sarajevo, where he graduated in 1959. In 1971 he received his Ph.D. in Zagreb with a thesis Life and work of Miho Klaić (Život i rad Miha Klaića), which was in 1980 published as a monograph titled Miho Klaić. He worked in Metković, whence he relocated to Zagreb, and since 1965 he has been working at the Miroslav Krleža Lexicographical Institute as an editor of historical encyclopedias and lexicons. He is the serving Editor-In-Chief of the Croatian Biographical Lexicon (since 1990) and an anthology Biobibliographica (since 2003).

His scientific research deals with the history of Dubrovnik and Neretva region. He has authored a number of historical contributions to Croatian history and politicians of the 19th and 20th century (Miho Klaić, Ivan Kukuljević Sakcinski, Petar Preradović, Stjepan Radić). He edited Povijest Hrvata od najstarijih vremena do svršetka XIX stoljeća ("History of Croats from the earliest times to the end of the nineteenth century"; multiple editions since 1972) by Vjekoslav Klaić, Pregled povijesti hrvatskog naroda ("Review of Croatian history"; 1975) by Ferdo Šišić, Sjećanja ("Memoirs"; 1995) by Zvonimir Vrkljan, Moj životopis (" My biography"; 1996) by Tias Mortigjija, and an anthology Hrvatska i održivi razvitak: humane i odgojne vrednote ("Croatia and sustainable development: the human and educational values"; 1999).

== Works ==
His seminal work Povijest hrvatskog naroda ("The History of the Croatian people"; 1971) was destroyed after the fall of the Croatian Spring, and was republished in a revised edition in 1992. His other works are:

- Iz povijesti Donjeg Poneretavlja (1971, extended edition in 1990)
- Susreti s hrvatskom Kliom (1991)
- Kratka povijest Hrvatske (A Short History of Croatia, co-authored with Josip Šentija, 1992)
- Povijesni prijepori (1992)
- Hrvatska povijest (1995)
- Rat i dokolica (1995)
- Rt Oštra u povijesti i politici (1998)
- Spremnost (1998)
- Posljednja opsada Dubrovnika (2001)
- Hrvatskom prošlosti: pogledi i osvrti (2011).

In 2005 he published a book of poetry Oskoruše.
