= Ferdinand Kulmer =

Croatian abstract painter and teacher

- Born: 29 January 1925; Cap Martin, France
- Died: 11 November 1998 (aged 73); Zagreb, Croatia
- Education: Zagreb, Budapest
- Known for: painting, graphics
- Movement: abstract
- Awards: Order of Danica Hrvatska

Ferdinand Kulmer (29 January 1925 – 11 November 1998) was a Croatian abstract painter and teacher.

He studied at the Budapest Academy of Fine Arts, the Zagreb Academy of Fine Arts, and took special classes with Đuro Tiljak. Kulmer worked in the studio of Krsto Hegedušić, and for many years was a professor at the Zagreb Academy of Fine Arts.

Kulmer's paintings tend towards abstract or semi-abstract scenes, with his early compositions based on still life or interiors featuring calligraphic brushwork. He developed a more heavily textured style, turning later to a looser, more gestural style with mythical themes that includes dancing calligraphic shapes. He designed costumes for two films by Vatroslav Mimica and Veljko Bulajic.

Member of the Croatian Academy of Sciences and Arts.

In 1990, Kulmer received the Vladimir Nazor Award for lifetime achievement in the visual arts.

== Biography ==
Ferdinand Kulmer was born 29 January 1925 in Cap Martin in the south of France, where his parents were spending the winter. The Kulmer family was aristocratic, old Croatian nobility of Austrian descent that had been prominent in the political circles of Zagreb during the rule of Austria-Hungary, and included the well-known 19th century lawyer and politician Baron Franjo Kulmer. Ferdinand's father was Count Alexander Kulmer, master of Cernik (near Nova Gradiška), and his mother was the Austrian noblewoman Countess Edeltrud Irmengild Hildegart Bopp von Oberstadt (b. 1892). Young Ferdinand spent a comfortable childhood on a number of family estates and residences, schooled by private tutor. From 1936 he attended the Jesuit boarding school of Kalksburg in Vienna. When Kulmer was 13, he travelled extensively with his father around the Mediterranean, and the following year to the United States (New York, Chicago, Detroit, Washington).

In 1942, Kulmer enrolled in the Budapest Academy of Fine Arts, where he studied under the Hungarian painter Rezso Zsombolya-Burghardt. It was an intense time, with the bombing of Pest by the Allied forces, and the family home reduced to ruins. By January 1945, Russian troops were entering Budapest, and amongst the general chaos, hunger and deprivation, Kulmer moved to Zagreb. The family fortune, along with most of their possessions was lost, and the privileged world of their relatives and friends had gone, taken over by the new socialist order. Kulmer retreated to his apartment in the Upper Town of Zagreb, part of the family palace on Catherine square. There he taught languages and attended the Academy of Fine Arts from 1945 to 1948, studying with Omer Mujadžić and Ljubo Babić. Kulmer also took special classes at the painting school of Đuro Tiljak during 1948–50.

From 1950 to 1957, Kulmer worked in the studio of Krsto Hegedušić. After 10 years of being unable to travel, in 1955 he was granted a passport, and a two-month scholarship to Paris. Given his upbringing and knowledge of languages and different cultures, he made good use of his opportunity, forming new friends and useful contacts, opening doors and gaining an insight into the changes of the art world. On his return to Zagreb, Kulmer conveyed these new ideas to the local artist community. In 1961, Kulmer was appointed assistant to Hegedušić at the Academy of Fine Arts, becoming a full professor in 1969.

In 1961, Kulmer held his first solo exhibition at the Museum of Contemporary Art in Zagreb.

Kulmer was a member of the artist group March (Mart), and joined Gallery Forum in 1969. He participated in the Paris exhibition Galerie d'art international in 1979. He designed costumes for two films by Vatroslav Mimica and Veljko Bulajic in 1974–75 and 1977.

Ferdinand Kulmer died in Zagreb on 11 November 1998.

== Legacy ==
Kulmer's earliest work has unfortunately not survived, so an analysis of his early development is not possible. During the 1950s, Kulmer was painting delicate, semi-abstract compositions based on still lifes or interiors, that featured stylised calligraphic elements. Following his visit to Paris in 1955, his paintings started to show the influence of Fauvism, particularly Henri Matisse and Raoul Dufy. By the end of the 1950s and into the early 1960s Kulmer developed a heavily textured style, producing completely abstract works with no recognizable forms. From this period comes the "Brown painting" that was purchased by the Tate Gallery in London.

Kulmer's work has been described as "eclectic", and he was certainly one of the artists that continued to evolve in new directions as time went on. The second half of the 1960s saw calligraphy back in his work, turning into the colourful zigzags that were such a strong feature of his creations in the 1970s. Afterwards he turned to a looser, more gestural style, with works that included dancing calligraphic shapes in black and white or bright colours formed by controlled pouring. By the 1980s, Kulmer had introduced mythological and heraldic motifs to his images, extremely simplified and stylized. The texture of his work showed the influence of Art Informel, while the subject matter relates to the ideas of neo-expressionism. In Kulmer's "Pegasus's Garden" for example, he was using palaeolithic symbols.

During the 1970s, Kulmer created the sets and costumes for two films. These historical dramas provided him with the opportunity to explore his own background and experiences when growing up. Prior to that time, his work had contained no references to history or his past, yet from the 1980s there is a strong sense of rich pageantry, heraldic emblems and escapism. His work is marked by strong, very real surface texture, almost tactile, combined with rich, complex tonal colour.

In 2007, Croatian Post, Inc. issued a stamp of Ferdinand Kulmer's "Pegasus' Garden" as part of their Croatian Modern Painting series.

== Works ==
- Ružičasta kuća (Pink House), 1954
- Glava (Head), 1954
- Žena u interieuru (Woman inside), 1955
- Interieur (Interior), 1956
- Admiral, 1957
- Laptir (Butterfly), 1957
- Visoka slika (Tall Painting), 1960
- Smeđa slika (Brown Painting), 1960
- Siva slika I (Grey Painting I), 1960
- Kompozicija (Composition), 1960
- Razgranatost II, 1965
- Narančasto-plavo-crna kaligrafia (Orange-Blue-Black Calligraphy), 1967
- Susreti I, 1966
- Šetnja, 1966
- Svibanj I, 1969
- Barbarosa, 1974
- Jour Fixe, 1979
- Veliki crni dogovor (Large Black Arrangement), 1983
- Ratni plijen - Golijatova kacija (Spoils of War - Goliath's Helmet), 1983
- Ganimedov lijet, 1984
- Grifonova nježnost, 1986
- Bijeg, 1987
- Tri figure i pas (Three figures and a dog), 1989
- Cvjetno lice, 1989
- Patetični triptihon II (Orfej), 1988
- Cvijet za Kazimira, 1990

Film set and costume design

- Peasant Revolt 1573 Vatroslav Mimica, 1975
- The man who should be killed (the false Emperor Scepan Mali) Veljko Bulajic, 1979

== Exhibitions ==
During his lifetime, Ferdinand Kulmer exhibited extensively in Europe (Paris, London, Vienna, The Netherlands, Belgium, Italy and Hungary), and in 1969 he became member of gallery "Forum" in Zagreb.

=== Solo exhibitions ===
Recent exhibitions of his work include:

- 2006 Ferdinand Kulmer, Adris Gallery, Rovinj
- 1990 Retrospektiva, Klovićev Courtyard, Zagreb
- 1984 Ferdinand Kulmer Pictures 1983, Museum of Contemporary Art, Zagreb
- 1976 Ferdinand Kulmer Pictures 1953-1976 - Modern Gallery, Zagreb
- 1971 Ferdinand Kulmer, Gallery of Fine Arts, Split
- 1961 Ferdinand Kulmer exhibition Museum of Contemporary Art, Zagreb

=== Group exhibitions ===
- 2008 From the holdings of the museum, Museum of Modern Art, Dubrovnik
- 2006 Croatian Collection, Museum of Contemporary Art, Skopje, Macedonia
- 2004 Image, Gesture and Matter - MMSU - Museum of Modern and Contemporary Art, Rijeka
- 1987 19° Bienal de São Paulo, São Paulo, Brazil

=== Public collections ===
Ferdinand Kulmer's work can be found in the following public collections:

==== Croatia ====
- Museum of Contemporary Art, Zagreb
- Modern Gallery, Zagreb
- Museum of Modern Art, Dubrovnik
- Gallery of Fine Arts, Split
- Rovinj Heritage Museum, Rovinj
- Galerija Galzenica, Velika Gorica

==== Macedonia ====
- Museum of Contemporary Art, Skopje

==== Serbia ====
- Museum of Contemporary Art, Belgrade

==== United Kingdom ====
- Tate Collection, London

== Sources ==
- Zidić, Igor (2006). In Mercuri's Sandals (a view of Kulmer) (PDF) (in Croatian, Italian, and English).

== Bibliography ==
- "Ferdinand Kulmer l'œuvre 1975-1983" Paris Art Center,1983., Paris
