= House of Pogledić =

Croatian noble family

House of Pogledić House of Prigledić
- Croatian noble family
- Current region: Croatia
- Origin: Turopolje

The House of Pogledić (Prigledić) is a Croatian noble family from Turopolje, Croatia. Its traditional seat is Kurilovec (a present-day part of the city of Velika Gorica). The family is noted in records dating to the 15th century and they received the status of nobility from Ferdinand I, Holy Roman Emperor in 1560.

== Notable family members ==
The House of Pogledić includes the following members:

- Franjo, served as a captain of Ban of Croatia Petar Zrinski in 1648–1653
- Juraj, took part in the 1740–1748 War of the Austrian Succession as a company commander, and commanded a regiment stationed in the Kostajnica Fortress in 1750; Reached the rank of a general in 1771
- Franjo, elected representative of the Turopolje district to the Croatian Sabor in 1861; He was an archivist in the Archive of Croatia-Slavonia-Dalmatia in Zagreb 1871–1882; He researched the history of Turopolje and nobility of Turopolje, and wrote books on the topics: Istina i nedvojna vlastitost plemenite obćine Turovoga Polja, razložena po jednom bratu iste obćine in 1850, and Imovina i život plemićah kotara turopoljskoga in 1877
- Dragutin, a proponent of the Croatian national revival, i.e. the Illyrian movement. In 1848–1849, he was the commissioner of the Ban of Croatia Josip Jelačić for the city of Varaždin and the Varaždin County. He was the deputy comes (head) of the Zagreb County in 1850–1851 and the deputy comes of the Virovitica County in 1854–1861. In 1861–1871, he held administrative positions in the government of Croatia-Slavonia, and the position of comes of the Zagreb County in 1871–1873 and 1875–1881.
- Cecilija, wife of Count Janko Drašković, a prominent figure of the Illyrian movement, from 1794 to her death in 1808

== See also ==
- List of noble families of Croatia

== Sources ==
- "Pogledić (Prigledić)". Hrvatska enciklopedija, mrežno izdanje (in Croatian). Miroslav Krleža Institute of Lexicography.
- Dobrica, Ladislav (2016). "Ostavština Janka Draškovića u fondu obitelji Drašković u Hrvatskom državnom arhivu" [Legacy of Janko Drašković in Drašković Family Collection in the Croatian State Archives]. Fontes: Izvori Za Hrvatsku Povijest (in Croatian). 22 (1). Zagreb: Croatian State Archives: 9–12. ISSN 1330-6804.
- Szabo, Agneza (2012). "Dragutin Pogledić Kurilovečki u žarištu hrvatske politike i kulture 19. stoljeća" [Dragutin Pogledić Kurilovečki in the Focus of Croatian Politics and Culture of the 19th Century] (PDF). Luč (in Croatian). 1 (1). Velika Gorica: Matica hrvatska, Velika Gorica branch: 39–48. ISSN 1334-627X.
