= Nikica Kolumbić =

Croatian historian and lexicographer

Nikica Kolumbić (6 October 1930 – 1 March 2009) was a Croatian historian and lexicographer.

He was born in Zagreb. He graduated Croatian studies at the Faculty of Philosophy in Zagreb in 1955, receiving a PhD in 1964 with a thesis On the origin and development of Croatian medieval passion poetry and drama (Postanak i razvoj hrvatske srednjovjekovne pasionske poezije i drame) at the Faculty of Philosophy in Zadar. There he continued to work as a professor of older Croatian literature.

He was the Editor-in-Chief of the first volume of the Croatian Biographical Lexicon (1983). Since 2002 he was a regular member of the Croatian Academy of Sciences and Arts.

His work on early Croatian literature is collected in books Hrvatska književnost od humanizma do manirizma (1980), Po običaju začinjavac (1994) and Poticaji i nadahnuća (2005). He edited and wrote commentaries on texts by Marko Marulić (1994), and provided a modern poetic rendition of Marulić's Judita. He also published a fictionalized biography of the Croatian humanist Fran Trankvil Andreis (Krvava rijeka, 1979) and a number of papers and theater critiques.

He died in Zadar.
