= David Bogdanović =

Croatian philologist (1869–1944)

- Born: 11 May 1869; Brod na Savi, Croatia-Slavonia, Austria-Hungary
- Died: 7 March 1944 (aged 74); Zagreb, Independent State of Croatia (now Croatia)
- Occupations: Philologist, literary historian

David Bogdanović (Brod na Savi, 11 May 1869 – Zagreb, 7 March 1944) was a Croatian philologist and literary historian. He pursued Slavic studies and the study of classics in at the University of Zagreb before becoming the principal of the Archdiocesan Classical Gymnasium in Zagreb. His principal work is the three-volume Review of Croatian and Serbian Literature (Croatian: Pregled književnosti hrvatske i srpske) published between 1914 and 1919. He also adapted works by Croatian and Serbian writers.
