= Đuro Tiljak =

Croatian artist, writer and teacher

- Born: 21 March 1895; Zagreb, Austria-Hungary (today's Croatia)
- Died: 11 December 1965 (aged 70); Zagreb
- Education: Zagreb, Moscow
- Known for: painting, graphics
- Movement: magical realism

Đuro Tiljak (1895–1965) was a Croatian artist, writer and teacher. He graduated from the Academy of Fine Arts in Zagreb, and studied for some time in Moscow with Wassily Kandinsky. During the 1930s, he was editor of the journal "Culture" (Kultura) and "Writer" (Književnik) magazine. For many years he was a professor at the Academy of Fine Arts in Zagreb. He was a member of the Croatian Academy of Sciences and Arts.

== Biography ==
Đuro Tiljak was born 21 March 1895 in Zagreb.

He began his art studies in Zagreb at the College of Arts and Crafts, later to become the Academy of Fine Arts. His teachers there included Oton Iveković and Ljubo Babić. In 1919, he spent some months in Moscow, studying with Wassily Kandinsky, returning to Zagreb to complete his degree in 1923. In order to pay back his scholarship, he took up teaching posts in schools.

During the 1930s, Tiljak travelled down the Dalmatian coast in search of inspiration, and visited the island of Vis.

In December 1942 Tiljak joined the partisans along with his friend Marijan Detoni. During the war period he found refuge in the painters' colony in Cozzan, returning to Zagreb in 1945 to take up the post of professor at the Academy of Fine Art in Zagreb where he continued to teach until his retirement.

Đuro Tiljak died in Zagreb on 11 December 1965.

== Legacy ==
Initially influenced by impressionist and postimpressionist painters such as Cézanne, Van Gogh and Matisse, Tiljak's style later moved towards magical realism. His landscapes were poetic, tending towards abstraction.

In the early 1930s, Tiljak was active in the controversy over artistic expression. Their views were opposed to those of the establishment, and the more intellectual artists. He was particularly critical of the painter Ljubo Babic and the Group of Three, contributing to the polarisation of the Croatian art scene of the time.

In the 1950s, he returned to a more intimate style, close to abstract.

Tiljak's legacy is not simply his own work, but in teaching a new generation of Croatian artists. His early training with Kandinsky gave him an appreciation for the abstract, which he imparted to his students.

In 1966, a memorial to the work of Đuro Tiljak was opened in Komiža, on the island of Vis

In 2000, Croatian Post, Inc. issued a stamp of Đuro Tiljak's "Brusnik", 1930 as part of their Croatian Visual Arts series.

== Works ==
- Park, 1925
- Brusnik, 1930
- Cipeliši (Shoes), 1931
- Djevojčica (Little Girl), 1944
- Kuča u prirodi (House in the Country)

== Exhibitions ==
=== Solo exhibitions ===
Recent exhibitions of his work include:

- 1972 Đuro Tiljak retrospective – Art Pavilion, Zagreb

=== Group exhibitions ===
- 1979 Paintings from the War for National Freedom, Museum of Modern Art, Dubrovnik

=== Public collections ===
Đuro Tiljak's work can be found in the following public collections

Croatia

- Museum of Contemporary Art, Zagreb
- Gallery of Fine Arts, Osijek

== Bibliography ==
- Đuro Tiljak – Retrospektivna Izložba. Monograph published by the Art Pavilion, Zagreb, 1972.
