= Antun Mihanović =

Croatian poet and lyricist (1796–1861)

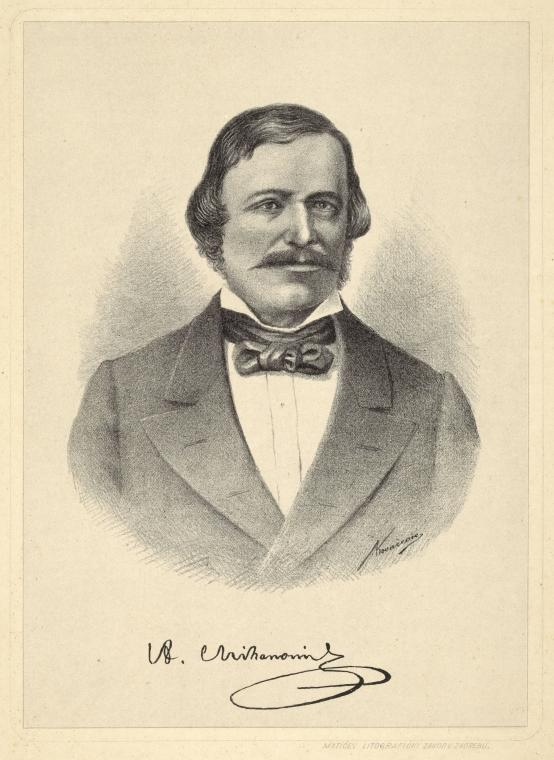
- Born: 10 June 1796; Zagreb, Kingdom of Croatia, Habsburg monarchy
- Died: 14 November 1861 (aged 65); Novi Dvori, Kingdom of Croatia, Habsburg monarchy
- Occupations: poet; lyricist; diplomat; military judge
- Known for: writing the national anthem of Croatia
- Relatives: Josip Kušević (uncle)

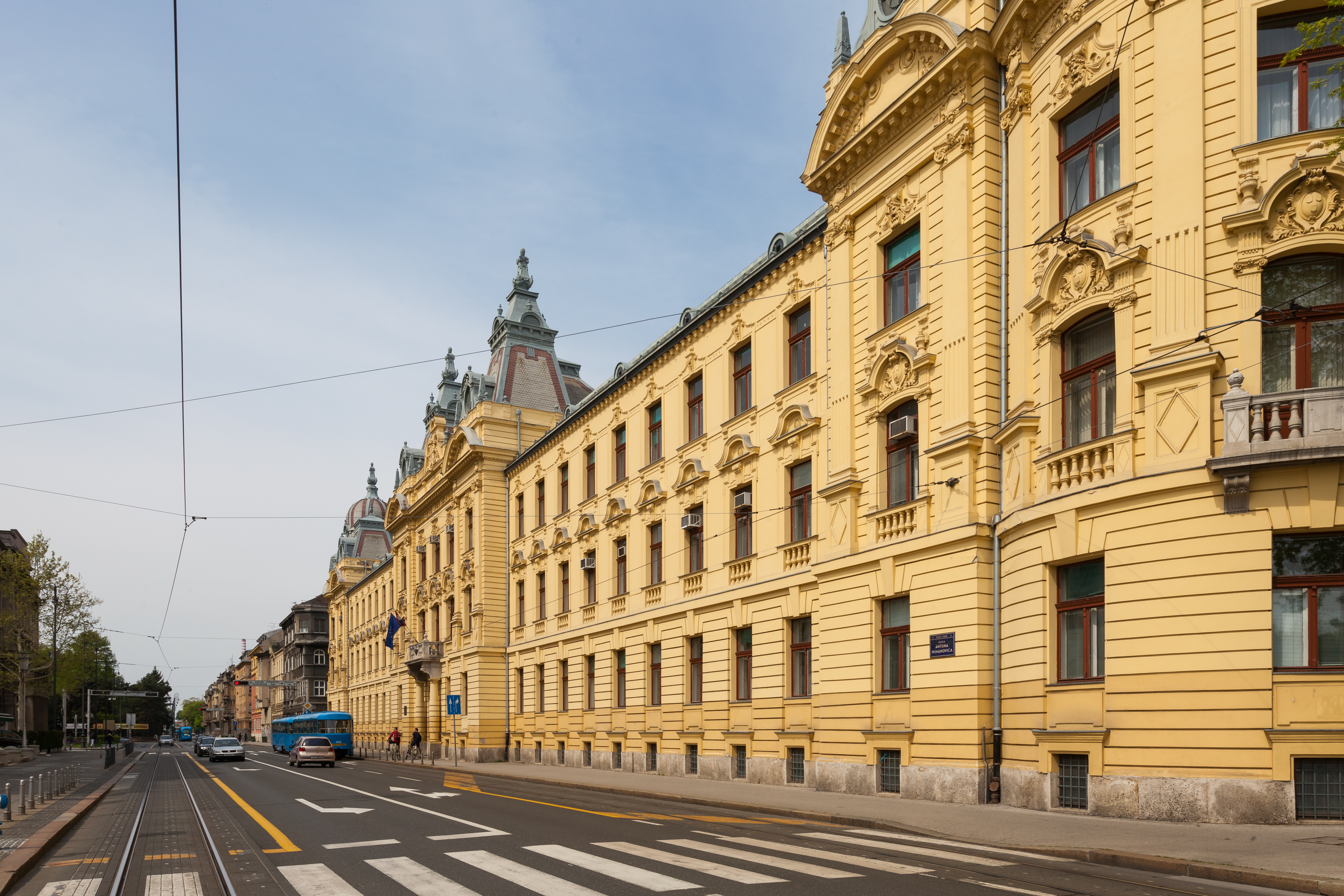
Antun Mihanović Street in the center of Zagreb.

Antun Mihanović (10 June 1796 – 14 November 1861) was a Croatian poet and lyricist, most famous for writing the national anthem of Croatia, which was put to music by Josip Runjanin and adopted in 1891. Klanjec, his birthplace, holds a monument to him and a gallery of his works.

== Biography ==
Mihanović studied law and worked as a military judge. After engaging in diplomacy, he was the Austrian consul in Belgrade, Thessaloniki, Smyrna, Istanbul and Bucharest. He retired in 1858 as a minister counselor, and lived in Novi Dvori until his death.

The poem which would become the Croatian anthem was Horvatska domovina. It was first published in the cultural magazine Danica ilirska, No. 10, edited by Ljudevit Gaj, in 1835. The anthem itself would become known as Lijepa naša (Our Beautiful), since those are the first two words of the poem.

Mihanović also wrote a small but important book, Rěč domovini o hasnovitosti pisanja vu domorodnom jeziku (A Word to the Homeland about the Benefits from Writing in Mother Tongue), published in Vienna in 1815. The ideas in this book became one of the foundations of the Illyrian Movement.

Josip Kušević, a Croatian lawyer and politician, was Mihanović's maternal uncle.
