= Mala Mlaka =

- Village
- Location within Croatia
- Coordinates: 45°43′43″N 15°58′39″E
- Country: Croatia
- County: City of Zagreb

Area
  - Total: 1.5 sq mi (4.0 km^{2})
- Elevation: 367 ft (112 m)

Population (2021)
  - Total: 591
  - Density: 380/sq mi (150/km^{2})
- Time zone: UTC+1 (CET)
  - Summer (DST): UTC+2 (CEST)

Mala Mlaka is a village in Croatia. It is formally a settlement (naselje) of Zagreb, the capital of Croatia.

== Demographics ==
According to the 2021 census, its population was 591. According to the 2011 census, it had 636 inhabitants.
