= Pavao Štoos =

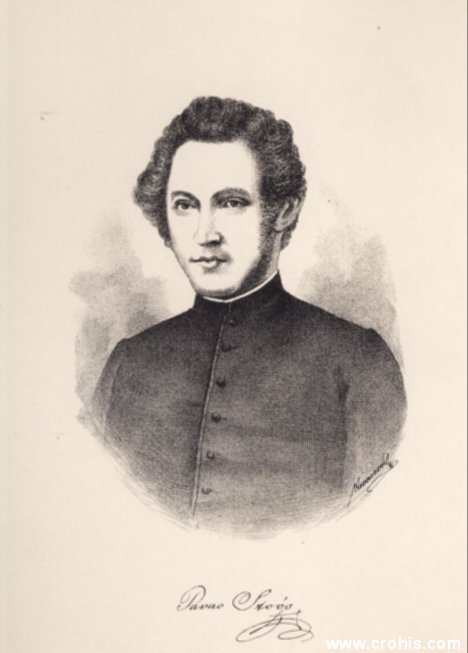
- Born: 10 December 1806; Dubravica, Kingdom of Croatia, Austrian Empire
- Died: 30 March 1862 (aged 55); Pokupsko, Kingdom of Croatia, Austrian Empire
- Occupations: Writer, priest, revivalist
- Writing career
- Literary movement: Romanticism

Pavao Štoos (10 December 1806 – 30 March 1862) was a Croatian poet, priest and a revivalist.

After graduating theology in Zagreb, he served as a bishop's secretary for a brief period, and from 1842 he was a pastor of the Pokupsko parish.

Štoos is a notable person among Croatian patriots; as the author of a well-known elegy Kip domovine vu početku leta 1831, collaborator of Ljudevit Gaj's Danica ilirska, he clearly articulated his concerns over the foreign oppression and the de-nationalisation of the common people (vre i svoj jezik zabit Horvati hote ter drugi narod postati). Štoos pessimistically observes contemporary political and cultural movements, seeing the country as if trapped in the darkness of a dungeon (srce od plača ne mrem zdržati).

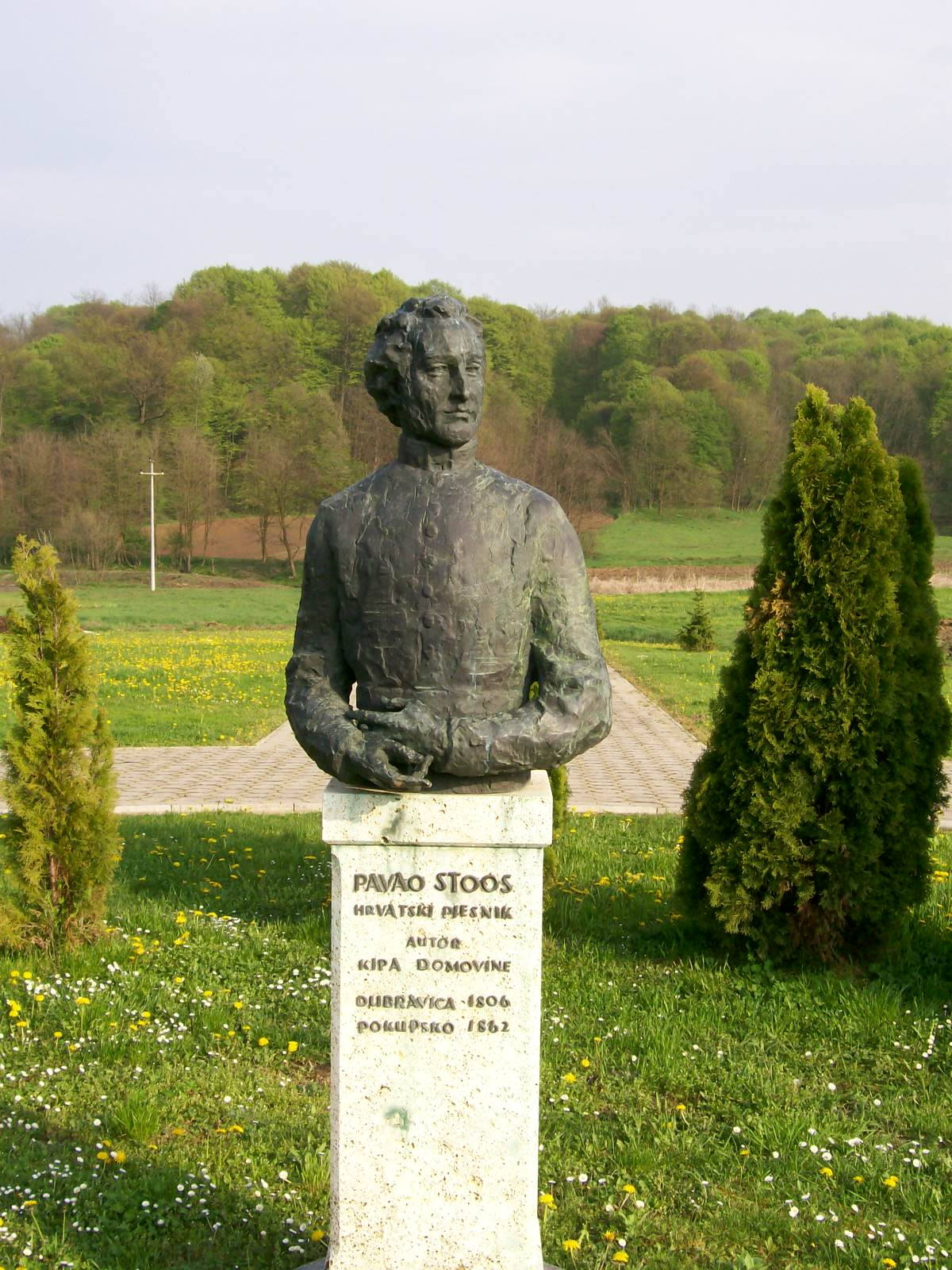
Pavao Štoos, monument in his native Dubravica

Besides the literature, he was also engaged in music and has published in 1858 Kitice srkvenih pjesama s napjevima. He is the author of the song "Poziv u kolo ilirsko".

In 1862 he was appointed as a Zagreb canon, but he died before he managed to officially receive the title.
