= Croatian state right =

Legal concept in Croatian law

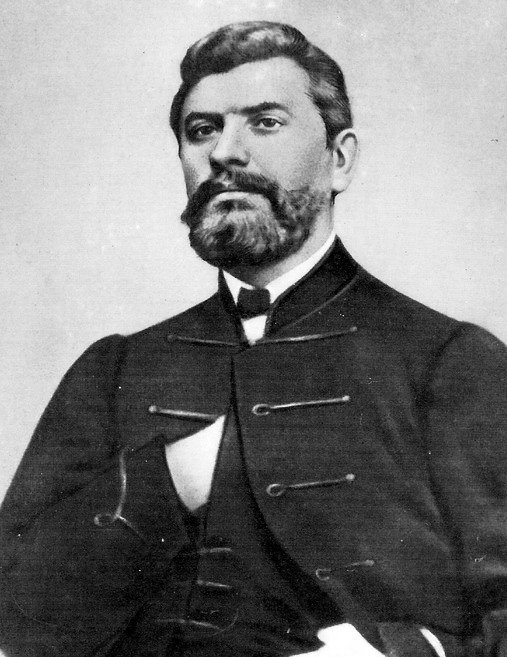
Ante Starčević was one of the principal contributors to development of the Croatian state right.

The Croatian state right (Croatian: Hrvatsko državno pravo) is a legal concept in Croatian law which represents the country's rules, the system of government, and public administrative bodies. Croatian sources point out existence and application of those rights in the era of Croatia in personal union with Hungary and during the rule of the Habsburg monarchy, as evidence of Croatia's continuous statehood since the medieval Kingdom of Croatia. The Croatian state right is listed in the preamble of the modern Constitution of Croatia as a source of the country's sovereignty, referring to the legal status of Croatia as an independent polity within the framework of various states throughout its history.

The concept was first introduced in 1830 by Josip Kušević in the context of Croatian national revival. Kušević based the idea on preservation and strengthening of town privileges, presenting Croatian state right as a means of defense against magyarisation. The name of the concept was popularised by Janko Drašković in his 1832 Dissertation. The concept of Croatian state right was further developed by Ante Starčević and Eugen Kvaternik. Starčević and Kvaternik argued that all people living in Croatia are Croats and that other nations can only exist by nation-building in their own states. Implications of this definition resulted in conflict between Croatian and Serbian nationalism.

== Origin ==
The legal concept of Croatian state right was introdudced Josip Kušević in 1830 as a reference to the body of town privileges in Croatia. He argued that the regulations constituting the town privileges represented a feudal legal constitution. Pointing to such regulations and the Croatian medieval state, Croatian elites held that Croats, or Croatian nobility, were one of "historic people" of the Habsburg monarchy and that the "historic peoples" had the claim to statehood or the "state right".

In 1790, Croatia's parliament, the Sabor, decided that a joint government with the Kingdom of Hungary would better protect Croatia from the threat of Germanisation and from the return of absolutist monarchs like the recently deceased Joseph II. Following that decision, a power struggle developed between the Hungarian and Croatian elites, groups which generally encompassed nobility and more affluent bourgeoisie. Hungarian elites promoted competing claims for a more centralised Lands of the Crown of Saint Stephen encompassing Hungary and Croatia. Meanwhile, Croatian elites argued against centralisation, viewing it as a threat to town privileges and municipal rights; they considered these rights evidence of Croatia's political autonomy, making them critical for the existence of Croatia as a polity.

== National revival and nationalism ==
The idea of Croatian state right as a form of constitution was promoted in the 19th century during the Croatian national revival. It was a means of preservation of Croatian political autonomy within the Austrian Empire and subsequently the Kingdom of Hungary. In the second half of the 19th century, Croatian nationalism fought against Magyarisation of Croatia and Croats by defining Croatia as a political not relying on ethnicity. This made Croatian state right, along with the principle of self-determination, key to the formation of the Croatian nation. Croatian state right was referenced in the same context by Janko Drašković in the 1832 manifesto of the Illyrian movement Dissertation or Conversation Presented to Lawful Gentlemen Representatives and Future Lawmakers of Our Kingdoms: Delegated to a Future Diet of Hungary, Held by an Old Native of These Kingdoms (Croatian: Disertatia iliti razgovor darovan gospodi poklisarom zakonskim i buduchjem zakonotvorzem kraljevinah nasih: za buduchu dietu ungarsku odaslanem, držan po jednom starom domorodcu kraljevinah ovih), normally referred to as the Dissertation (Croatian: Disertacija).

Croatian state right was elaborated as a legal concept by Ante Starčević, the founder of the Party of Rights. In that respect, Starčević argued that states form "citizens' states" in which all citizens are equal and the definition of a nation does not rely on ethnic or religious criteria. Starčević's ideas regarding Croatian state right and implications on definition of the nation were further developed by Eugen Kvaternik. Starčević and Kvaternik described Croatian state right as belonging to the Croatian "political people", defined as medieval nobility and contemporary general public. Building on Starčević's idea that the existence of a state can create its associated nation, the two claimed that there are no other peoples in Croatia other than Croats because existence of other nations can only come about through their right to another, separate political territory. This definition of the Croatian state right created a conflict between Croatian nationalism and Serbian nationalism, as the latter advocated popular sovereignty which would erase borders of previously existing polities with the aim of uniting all Serbs in a single state, including the Serbs of Croatia.

At the Sabor convened in 1861, following the end of the absolutist rule of Austrian prime minister Baron Alexander von Bach, Starčević and Kvaternik put forward pravaštvo (lit. 'Rightism') as the ideology of the nascent Party of rights. The ideology called for integration of the Croatian nation on the basis of Croatian state right and for creation of a Croatian state independent of the Habsburg monarchy.

== Subsequent applications ==
In 1917, as Austria-Hungary was facing its dissolution, representatives of South Slavs living in Austria-Hungary introduced the May Declaration to the Imperial Council, unsuccessfully proposing a reform of the monarchy. The declaration cited the concept of Croatian state right as its basis. In the context of the declaration, the reference to Croatian state right was meant as a reference to a source of legitimacy to act. Despite the failure of the May Declaration and loss of popularity and influence of Party of Rights after the end of World War I and the creation of Yugoslavia, the concept of Croatian state right persisted in Croatian politics. It was possible because it was endorsed accepted by Stjepan Radić's Croatian People's Peasant Party, which became the most influential political party among Croats in the interwar period following the 1920 elections.

During World War II, the State Anti-Fascist Council for the National Liberation of Croatia (ZAVNOH), established by the Communist Party of Croatia (a branch of the Communist Party of Yugoslavia), was founded as the supreme legislative body of Croatia under the control of the Yugoslav Partisans. In the immediate aftermath of World War II, ZAVNOH renamed itself the People's Sabor of Croatia (Croatian: Narodni sabor Hrvatske). The name change was designed to signify the historical continuity of the Croatian legislative body as a representation of Croatia's sovereignty. The modern Constitution of Croatia also references the Croatian state right in its preamble.

== Modern definition ==
As a legal concept in Croatian law, Croatian state right refers to all written and customary rules on the establishment and functioning of government and public administrative bodies in Croatia. It also refers to the legal status of Croatia as a polity within the Kingdom of Hungary after the Pacta conventa, the Habsburg Monarchy, the Austrian Empire and Austria-Hungary. In Croatian law, application of the Croatian state right is interpreted as evidence of unbroken statehood of Croatia since the medieval Kingdom of Croatia.

== See also ==
- Greater Croatia
- Greater Serbia
- Right to exist

== Sources ==
- "Hrvatsko državno pravo" [Croatian State Right]. Croatian Encyclopedia, on-line edition (in Croatian). Miroslav Krleža Institute of Lexicography.
- Banac, Ivo (1984). The National Question in Yugoslavia: Origins, History, Politics. Ithaca, New York: Cornell University Press. ISBN 0-8014-1675-2.
- Bartulin, Nevenko (2012). "From Independence to Trialism: The Croatian Party of Right and the Project for a Liberal "Greater Croatia" within the Habsburg Empire, 1861–1914". In Fitzpatrick, Matthew P. (ed.). Liberal Imperialism in Europe. London: Palgrave Macmillan. pp. 115–140. ISBN 978-1-349-43739-9.
- Halužan, Valentina (2012). "180 godina disertacije Janka Draškovića" [180 Years of Janko Drašković's Dissertation]. Hrvatistika: Studentski jezikoslovni časopis (in Croatian). 6 (6). Osijek: University of Osijek, Faculty of Philosophy: 217–220. ISSN 1846-1522.
- Matić, Davorka (2007). "13: Is Nationalism Really That Bad? The Case of Croatia". In Matić, Davorka; Ramet, Sabrina P. (eds.). Democratic Transition in Croatia – Value Transformation, Education, and Media. College Station: Texas A&M University Press. ISBN 9781603444521.
- Pavlowitch, Kosta St. (2003). "The First World War and Unification of Yugoslavia". In Djokic, Dejan (ed.). Yugoslavism: Histories of a Failed Idea, 1918–1992. London: C. Hurst & Co. p. 32. ISBN 1-85065-663-0.
- Ramet, Sabrina P. (2006). The Three Yugoslavias: State-Building and Legitimation, 1918–2005. Bloomington: Indiana University Press. ISBN 978-0-253-34656-8.
- Rudolf, Davorin; Čobanov, Saša (2009). "Jugoslavija: unitarna država ili federacija povijesne težnje srpskoga i hrvatskog naroda – jedan od uzroka raspada Jugoslavije" [Yugoslavia: A Unitary State or Federation (Conflicting Historical Tensions – One of the Causes of the Dissolution of Yugoslavia and the War in Croatia 1991-1996)]. Zbornik radova Pravnog fakulteta u Splitu (in Croatian). 46 (2). Split: University of Split, Faculty of Law: 287–314:294. ISSN 0584-9063.
- Sirotković, Hodimir (1971). "Stvaranje federalne Hrvatske u narodnooslobodilačkoj borbi" [Creation of the Federal Croatia in the National Liberation Struggle]. Časopis za suvremenu povijest (in Croatian). 3 (2–3). Zagreb, Croatia: Croatian Institute of History: 15–36. ISSN 0590-9597.
- Szabo, Agneza (2012). "Dragutin Pogledić Kurilovečki u žarištu hrvatske politike i kulture 19. stoljeća" [Dragutin Pogledić Kurilovečki in the Focus of Croatian Politics and Culture of the 19th Century] (PDF). Luč (in Croatian). 1 (1). Velika Gorica: Matica hrvatska, Velika Gorica branch: 39–48. ISSN 1334-627X.
- Tomas, Domagoj; Njari, Denis (2022). "Ivo Frank i revizija Trianonskoga ugovora" [Ivo Frank and the Revision of the Treaty of Trianon]. Časopis za suvremenu povijest (in Croatian). 54 (2). Zagreb: Hrvatski institut za povijest: 421–444. doi:10.22586/csp.v54i2.21227. ISSN 0590-9597.
- Veselinović, Velimir (2018). "Pregled razvoja pravaške ideologije i politike" [An Overview of the Development of Rightist Ideology and Politics]. Časopis za suvremenu povijest (in Croatian). 50 (3). Zagreb: Croatian Institute of History: 583–620. ISSN 0590-9597.
- Vujačić, Veljko (2015). Nationalism, Myth, and the State in Russia and Serbia. Cambridge University Press. p. 202. ISBN 9781107074088.
