= Croatian Biographical Lexicon =

Croatian biographical dictionary

Croatian Biographical Lexicon (Croatian: Hrvatski biografski leksikon) is a multi-volume biographical and bibliographical encyclopedia in Croatian, published by the Miroslav Krleža Institute of Lexicography. It contains biographies of prominent Croats, as well as foreigners who participated in Croatian public life and have left their mark on the history of Croatia.

The project was launched in the second half of the 1970s. Seven volumes have been published so far with a total of 10,218 articles (3,524 illustrations). The editor-in-chief of the first volume was Nikica Kolumbić, of the second volume Aleksandar Stipčević, and between 1990 and 2013 the chief editor has been Trpimir Macan. Since 2014, the editor-in-chief has been Nikša Lučić.

Many of the biographies in the lexicon have been researched and published for the first time.

== Volumes ==
Vol.	Title	Year	Editor-in-chief	Page count
1	A–Bi	1983	Nikica Kolumbić	800
2	Bj–C	1989	Aleksandar Stipčević	784
3	Č–Đ	1993	Trpimir Macan	779
4	E–Gm	1998	Trpimir Macan	766
5	Gn–H	2002	Trpimir Macan	775
6	I–Kal	2005	Trpimir Macan	761
7	Kam–Ko	2009	Trpimir Macan	842
8	Kr–Li	2013	Trpimir Macan	714
9	Lo–Marj	2021	Nikša Lučić	
	Mark–Ž	Online edition	Nikša Lučić	
Source: Official website
