= Vojin Bakić =

Croatian sculptor (1915–1992)

- Војин Бакић
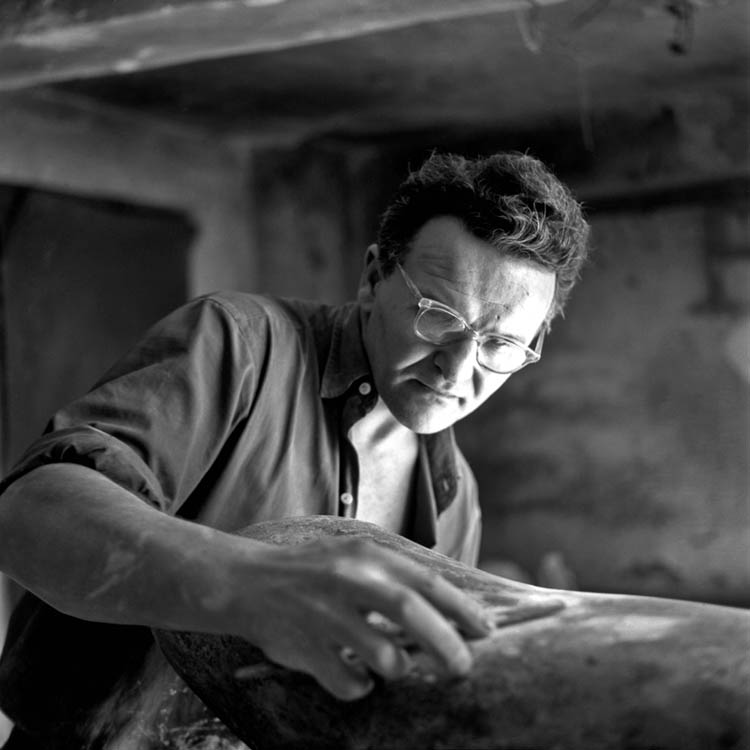
- Bakić working in his atelier (1956)
- Born: 5 June 1915; Bjelovar, Croatia-Slavonia, Austria-Hungary
- Died: 18 December 1992 (aged 77); Zagreb, Croatia
- Known for: Sculpture
- Movement: Modernism

Vojin Bakić (Serbian Cyrillic: Војин Бакић; 5 June 1915 – 18 December 1992) was a prominent Yugoslav sculptor.

Educated at the Zagreb Academy of Fine Arts and by Ivan Meštrović and Frano Kršinić, Bakić's early works were dominated by a figurative depiction of female nudity with reduced breasts and closed volumes. After 1945, he moved towards the impressionistic treatment of the surface with expressive transitions of light and shadow without superfluous details, which, according to him, represented the expression of the joy of life, flash, and light, something he shared with his contemporaries who wanted to create a better and more humane world in post-World War II Yugoslavia. He was at first influenced by the socialist realism, but later shifted towards modernism in the late 50s, embracing the challenges of an open form, interior spaces and light reflections, being among the first sculptors in Croatia that followed the program principles of geometric - in his case mostly circular - abstraction and optical research. His best-known works are busts of I. G. Kovačić and S. S. Kranjčević, Bjelovarac, Taurus, Light Forms, and WWII monuments at Petrova Gora, Kamenska, Kragujevac and Dotršćina. Bakić succeeded in realizing the avant-gardism of abstraction with the monumentality and immediacy that were traditionally features of classical figurative sculpture.

During his lifetime, Bakić exhibited in over 200 group exhibitions in Yugoslavia, of which 75 were organized abroad. Uninterested in his own promotion, deeply immersed in creation, he had only a handful of solo exhibitions. In 1979, he received the Vladimir Nazor Award for lifetime and achievements in the arts.

== Work and artistic career ==
Bakić was an important figure, particularly in the 1950s and 1960s Croatian contemporary art scene, and collaborated with the group EXAT-51 and the Nove tendencije (New Tendencies) movement. He executed many public sculptures notably, the Call to Arms (the man from Bjelovar), Bjelovar (1946) the Monument to the Revolution in Kamenska (1958–1968), the Monument to the Train Accident Victims in Zagreb (1975–1978), the Monument to the Uprising of the People of Kordun and Banija on Petrova Gora (1982) as well as monuments in Kragujevac and Dotrščina (Valley of Graves).

After 1945 he gravitated towards the impressionistic treatment of the surface. This period is primarily marked by his portraits of Ivan Goran Kovačić (1946) and Silvije Strahimir Kranjčević (1948). During the 1950s Bakić reduced the volume of his sculptures by the use of sharp fractures as edges, and later by merging the details of the sculptural mass (Self-portrait, 1952 and sketch for the Marx and Engels Monument, 1950–1953). During that time, he made an entire series of bull sculptures in various dimensions (Bull, 1950, 1956). With the series entitled Nudes, Torsos and Heads he completed his focus on organic, associative shapes, and from 1958 he turned towards the challenge of open forms, inner spaces and light reflections. Further professional development made him the first artist in a local context to follow the principles of geometric abstraction and to start the study of optic effects. By alternating concave and convex surfaces, he made "light shapes" which were close to constructivist poetics. In Elaborated Surfaces (1960–1964) he articulated strict and consistent units made of lined-up elements, whereas in Light-bearing Shapes (1963–1964) he created effective structures by means of modulating identical mirror units, for which he also used new materials, such as stainless steel.

== Exhibitions and awards ==
At his first solo exhibition (Bjelovar, 1940) he exhibited drawings and sculptures where the predominating subjects were female nudes in stone, characterized by reduced curves and closed volumes. From 1940 he participated at many national and international exhibitions: the Venice Biennial (1950, 1956, 1964), the Mediterranean Biennial in Alexandria (1956, 1969), the Milan Triennial XI (1957), Documenta in Kassel (1959), the Rijeka Salon (1959, 1961). He also exhibited with Ivan Picelj and Aleksandar Srnec in Paris (Gallery Denis René, 1959) and London (1960). He participated at the New Tendencies exhibitions (Zagreb, 1963, 1969, Gelsenkirchen, 1969 and Mainz, 1971), the São Paulo Biennial (1969), and at the exhibition Constructivism and Kinetic Art (Zagreb, 1995). Gallery Nova (Zagreb, 2007), in collaboration with the artist's family, organized the opening of Bakić's first solo exhibition in Croatia after 41 years. In 1979 he received the Vladimir Nazor Award for life achievement.

== Destruction of Bakić's monuments ==
During the early 1990s, after the fall of the Communist regime, many of Bakić's Yugoslav World War II monuments and memorials in Croatia were damaged, destroyed or removed from public spaces.

a) Destroyed monuments from 1990 to 1995:

- Bjelovarac, bronze, Bjelovar, a gift to his home town. Mine-blasted in 1991. Restored on 8 December 2010.
- Gudovčan, bronze, Mine-blasted in 1991. Melted.
- Monument to the victory of the people of Slavonia, stainless steel, Voćin. Blasted on 21 February 1992. Parts of it were used to produce utensils and dishware.
- Monuments to Partisans of Bilogora, bronze, Bačkovica near Bjelovar. Destroyed in 1991.
- 6–7 smaller statues in the Dotrščina Memorial Park near Zagreb were destroyed or stolen.
- Busts of Ljudevit Jonke, Silvije Strahimir Kranjčević, and Ivan Goran Kovačić. Bust of Ivan Goran Kovačić was destroyed on 17 July 2004.

b) Damaged monuments:

- Monument to the uprising of the people of Kordun and Banija, reinforced concrete and stainless steel. After Operation Storm, the monument was devastated.
- Memorial to Bakić Brothers in Bjelovar. Removed.
- Memorial on Bakić family tomb. Removed.
- Bust of Josip Broz Tito in Veliko Trojstvo. Removed and relocated to the Bjelovar museum.

== Works published on Vojin Bakić ==
- Matić, Dušan – Vojin Bakić: Moj prijatelj, (Euroknjiga, 2007)
- Galerija Nova – Novine #12, (Zagreb, June 2007)

== Gallery of work ==
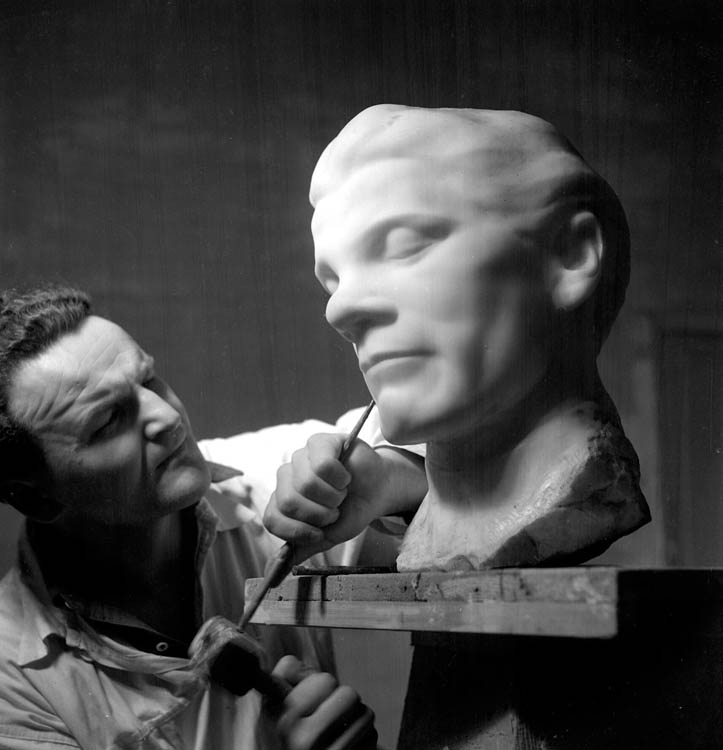
Bakić working on the Ivan Goran Kovačić bust (1946)

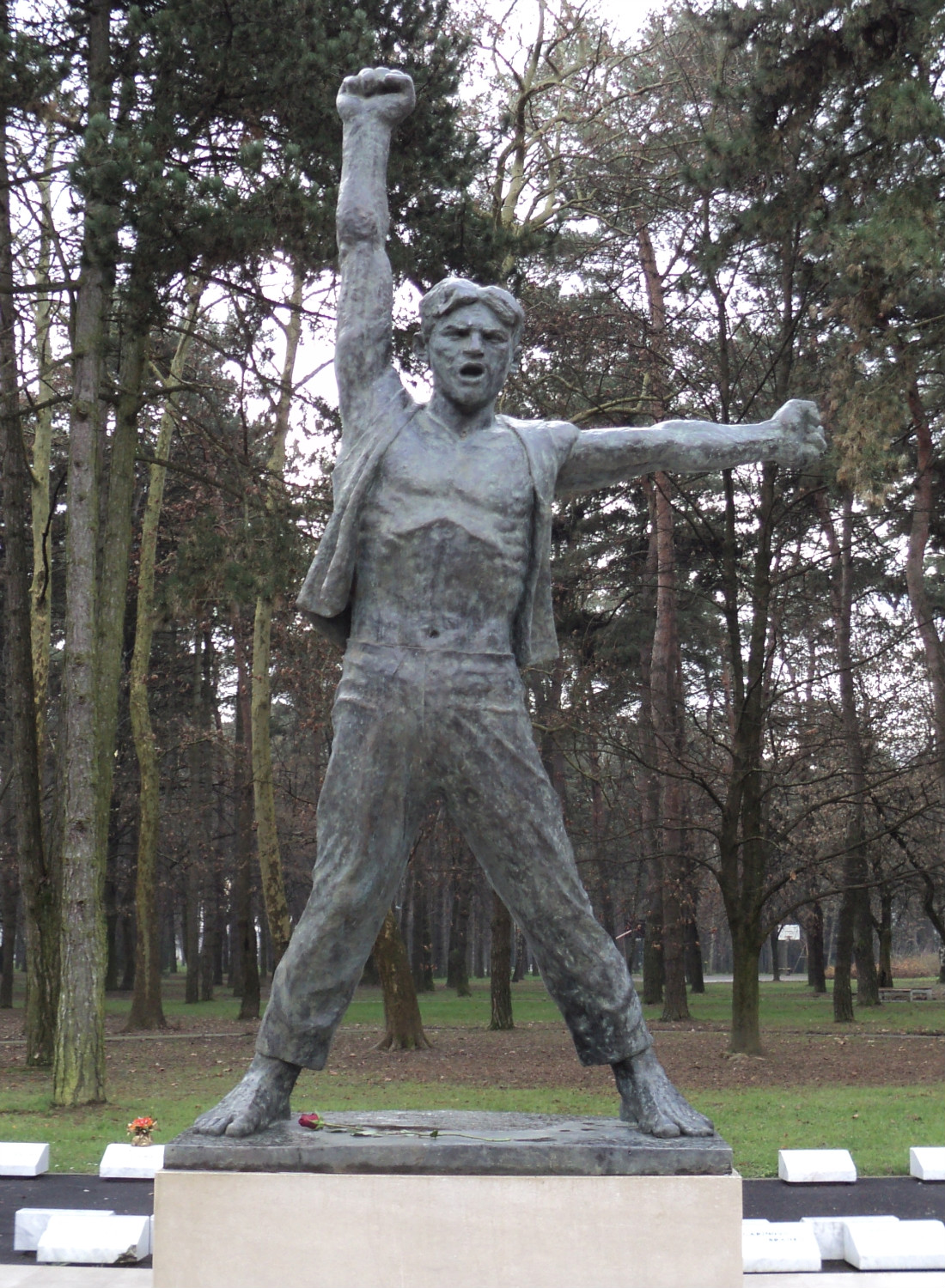
Bejlovarac (1947), Borik Memorial Park, Bjelovar (Part of the series of statues "Call to the Uprising")

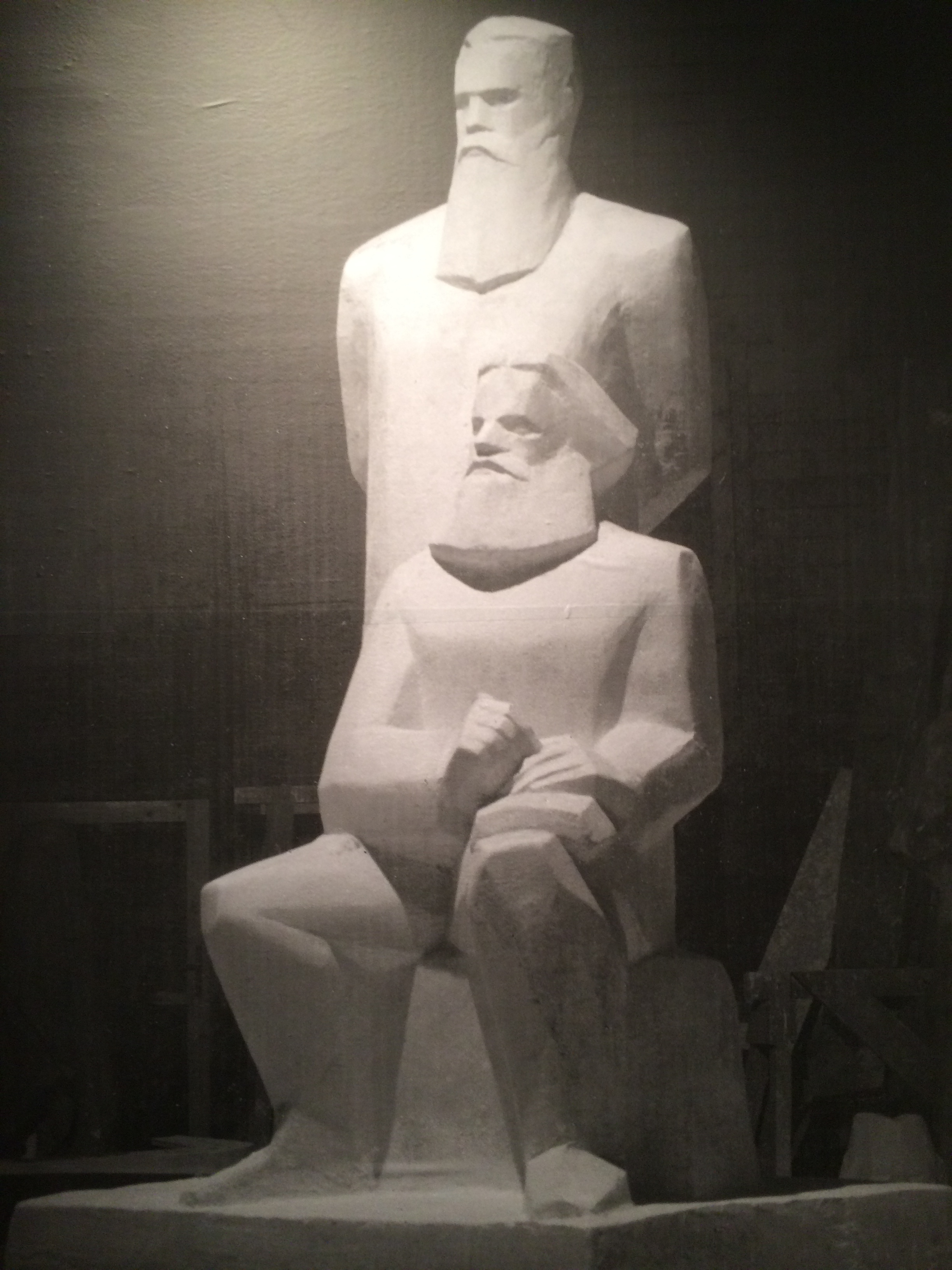
Monument to Marx and Engels (1953)

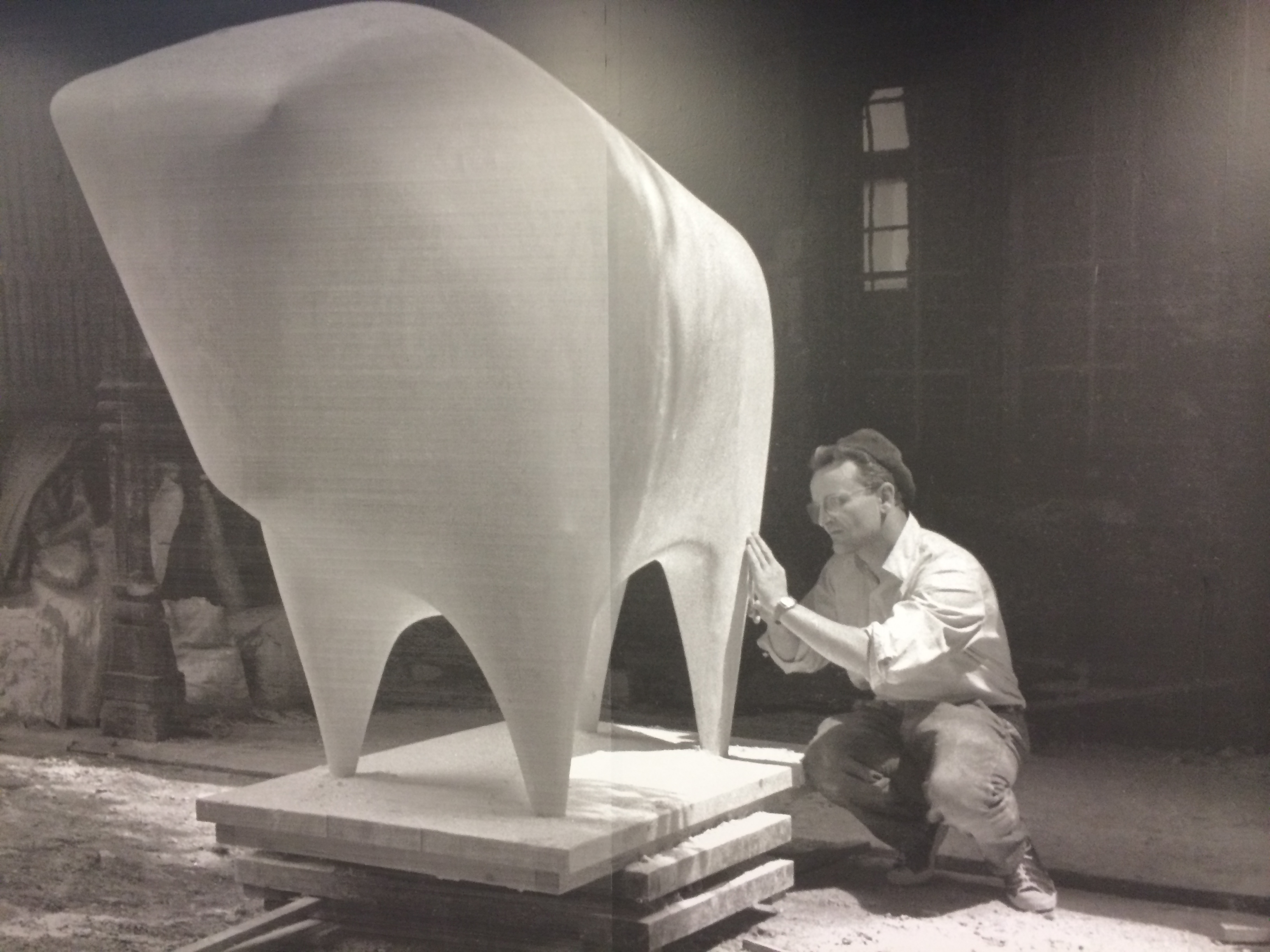
Taurus (1956)

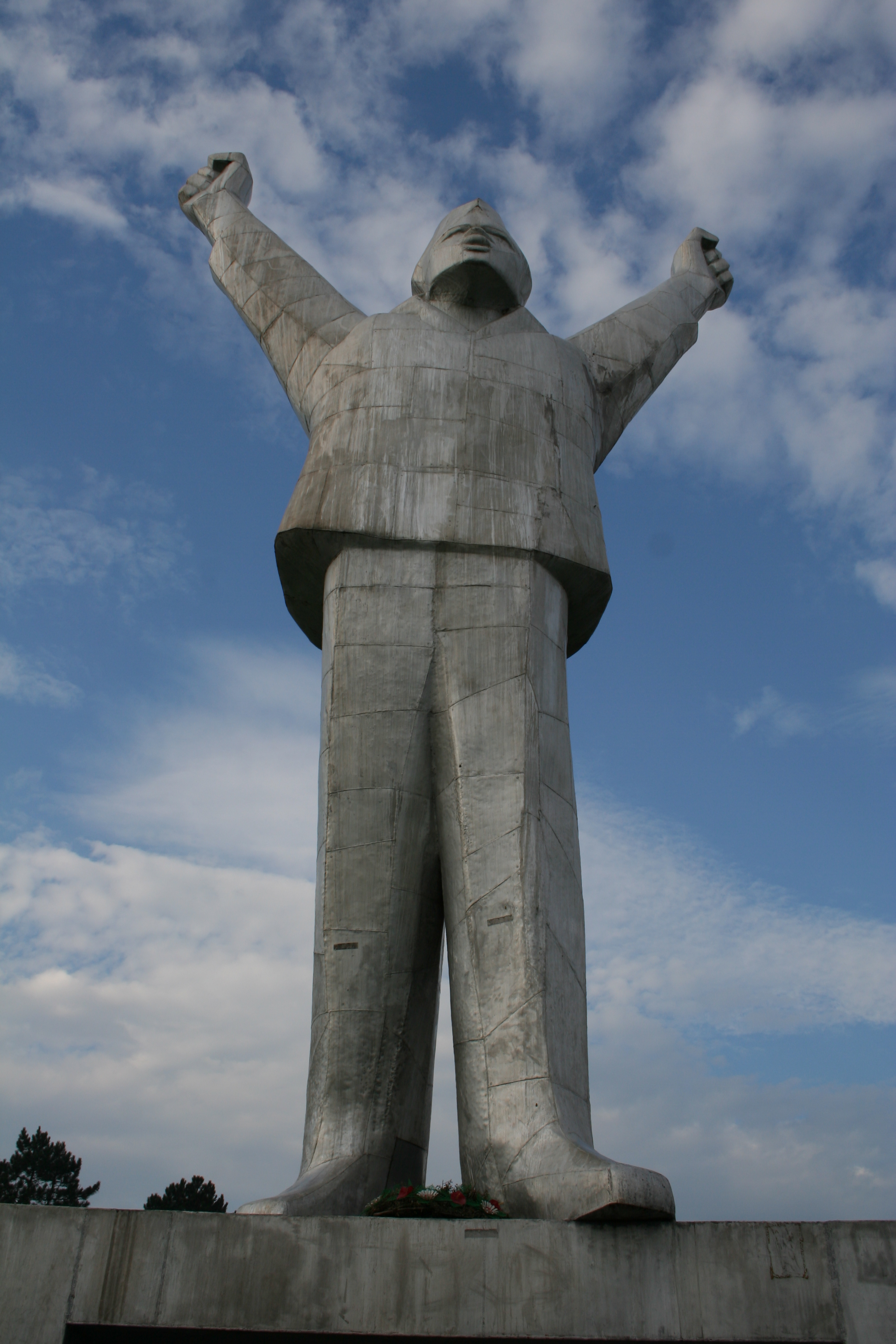
Stjepan Filipović monument (1960), Valjevo

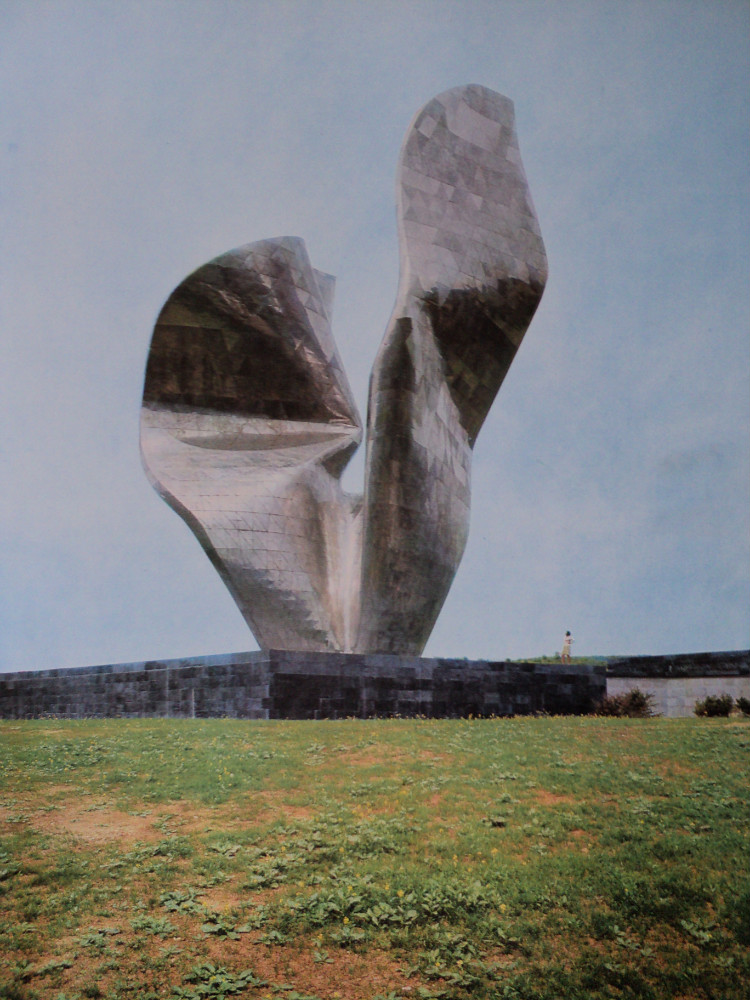
Monument to the Victory of the People of Slavonia (1957–68), Kamenska (destroyed)

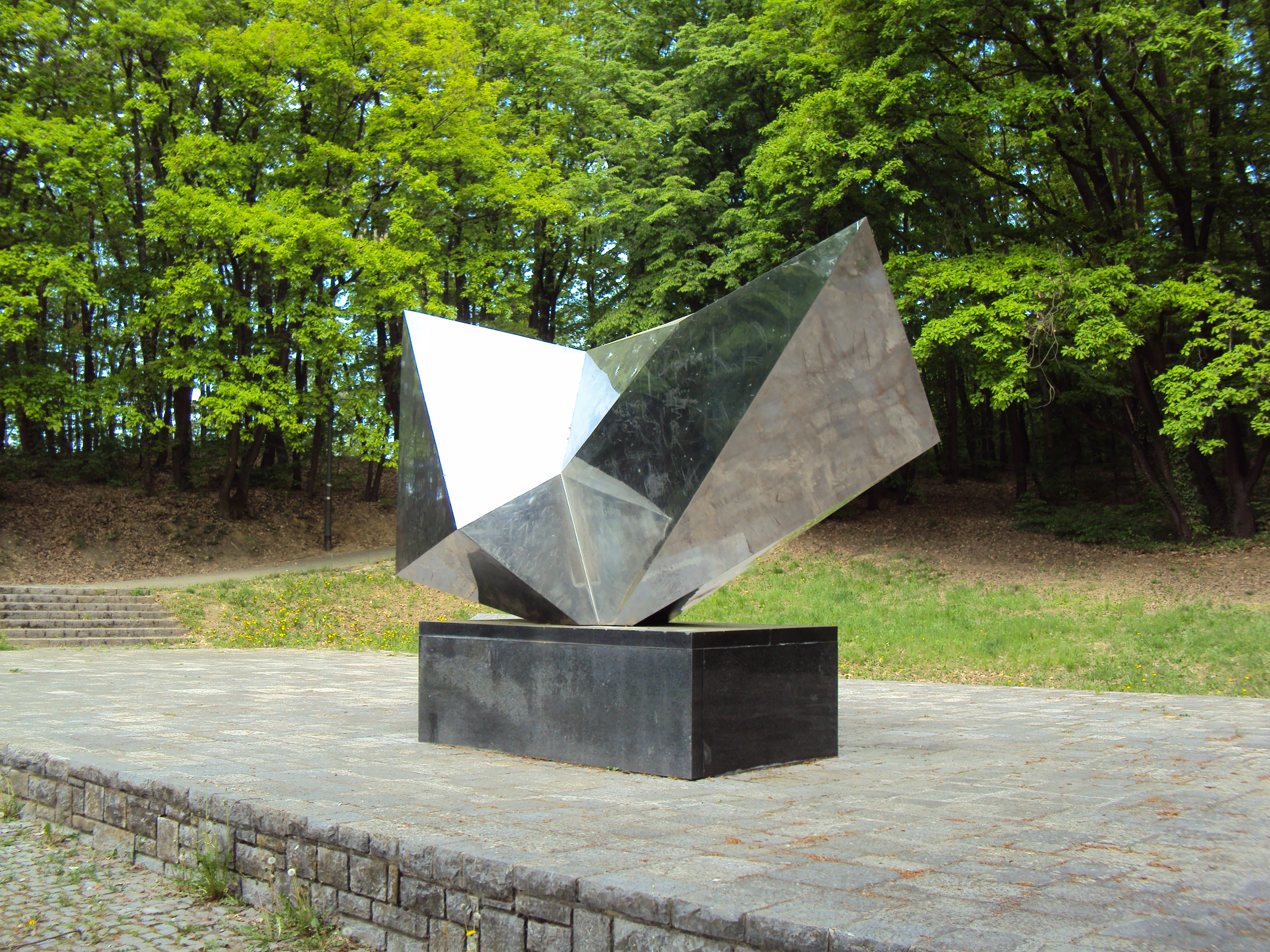
Dotrščina Monument (1963–68), Dotrščina Memorial Park, Zagreb

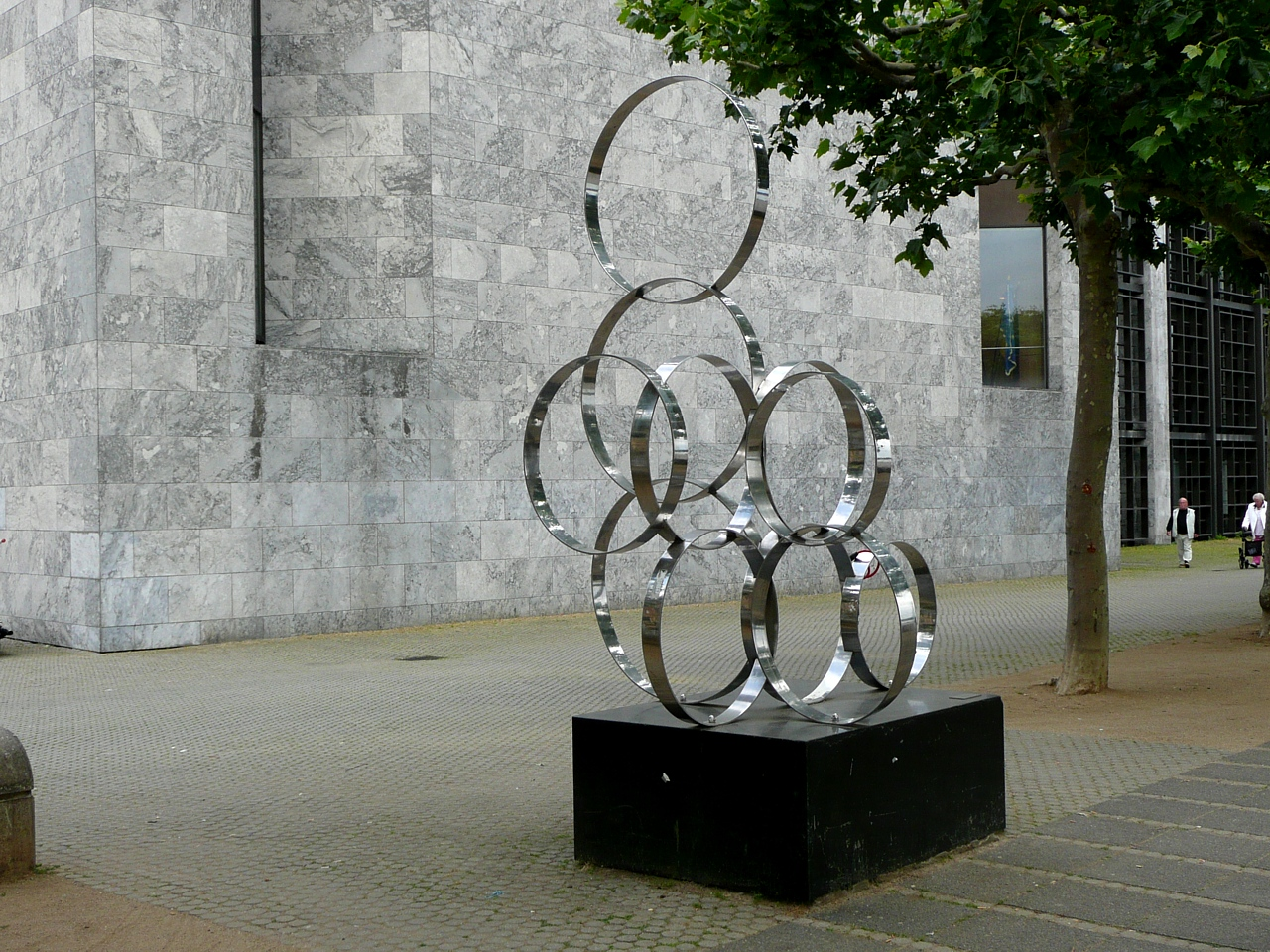
Rings (1974), Mainz

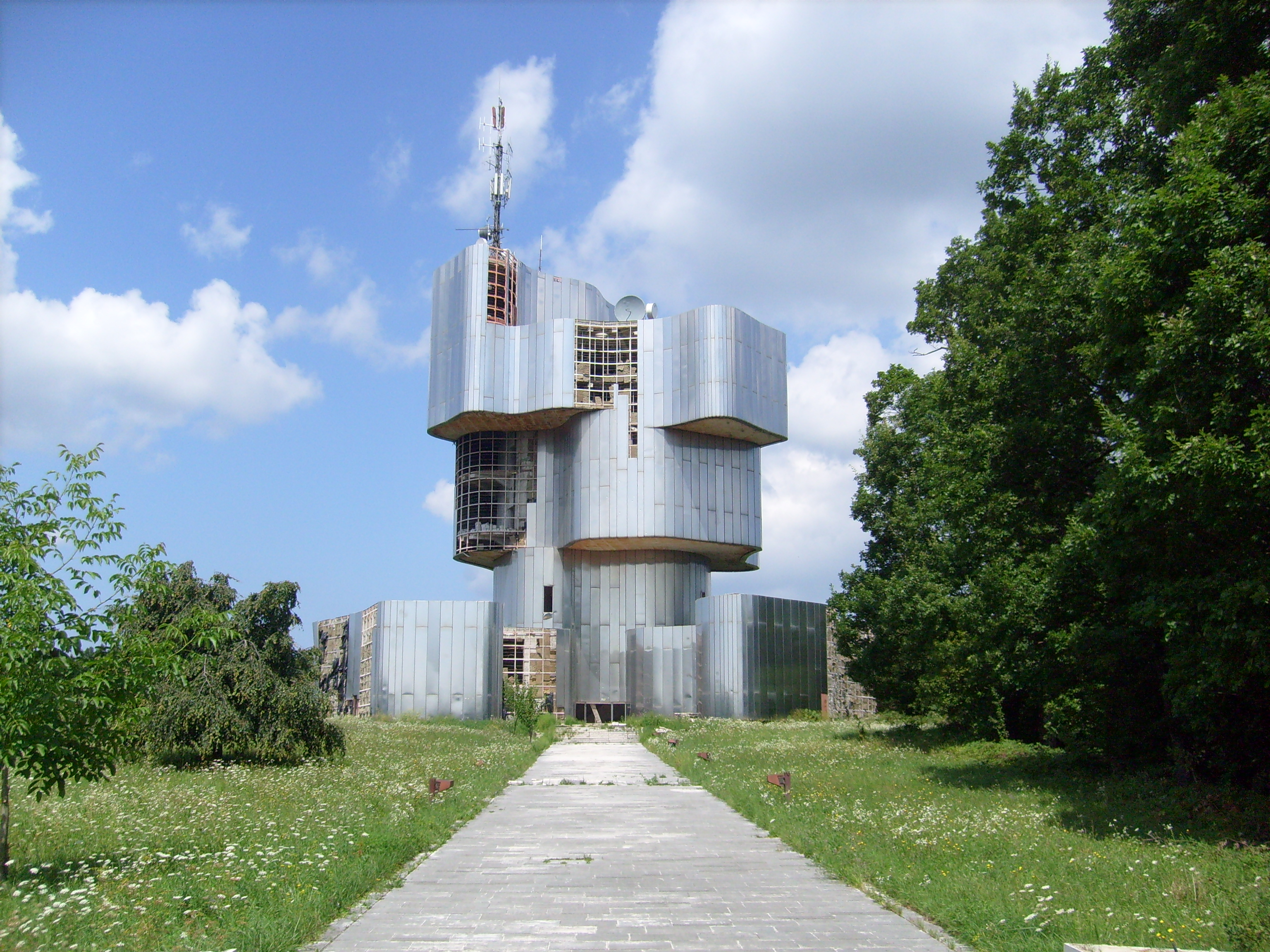
Monument to the Uprising of the People of Kordun and Banija (1971–81), Petrova Gora

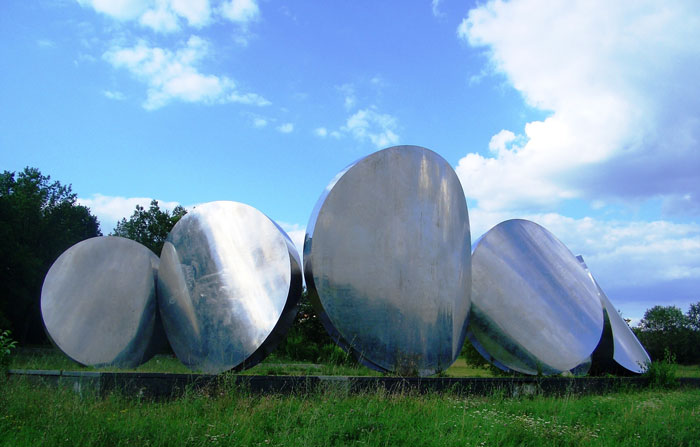
Circles (1981), Šumarice Memorial Park, Kragujevac

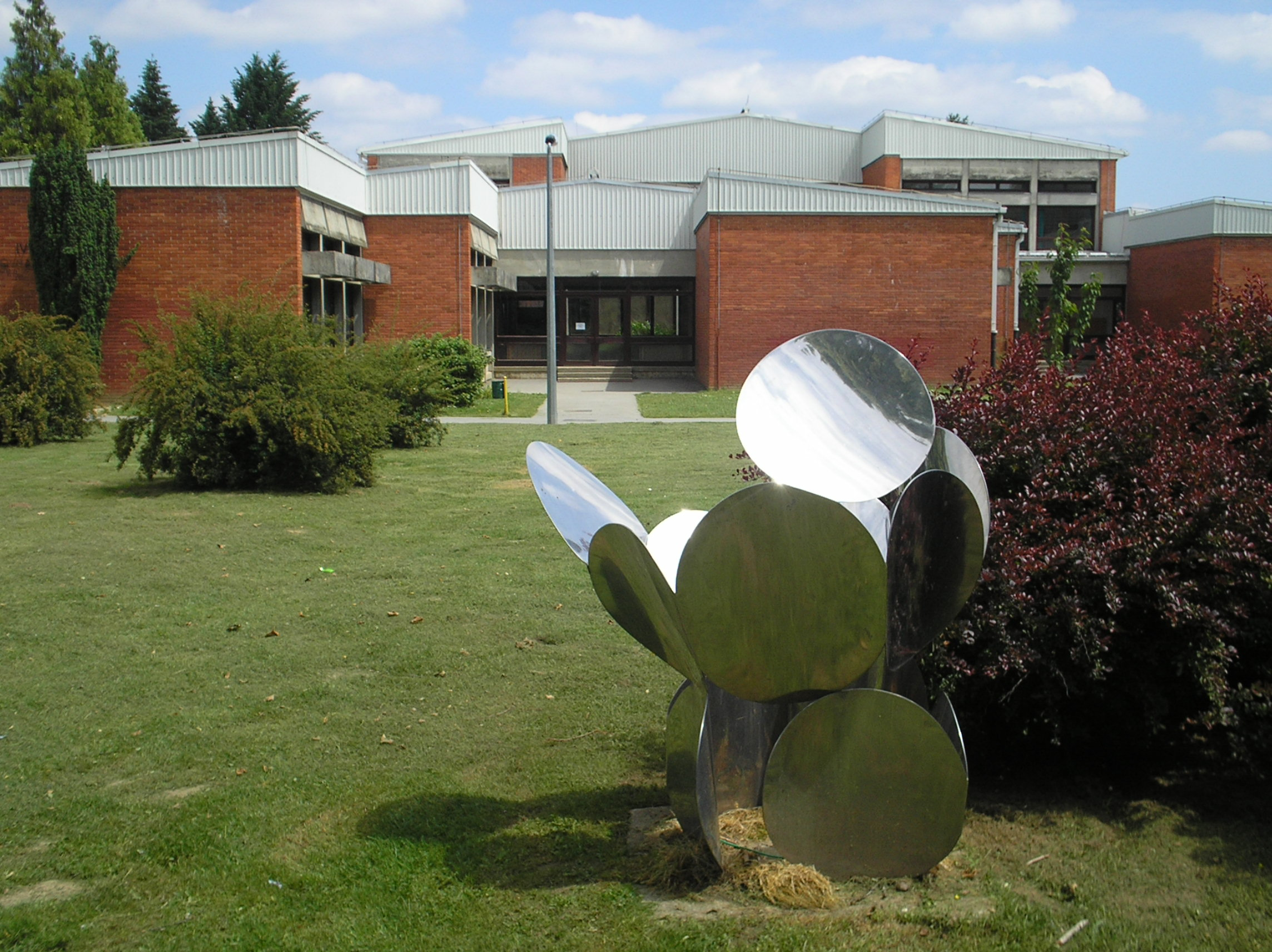
Mirrors, Location: Bjelovar
