= Margarita Froman =

Russian ballet dancer (1890–1970)

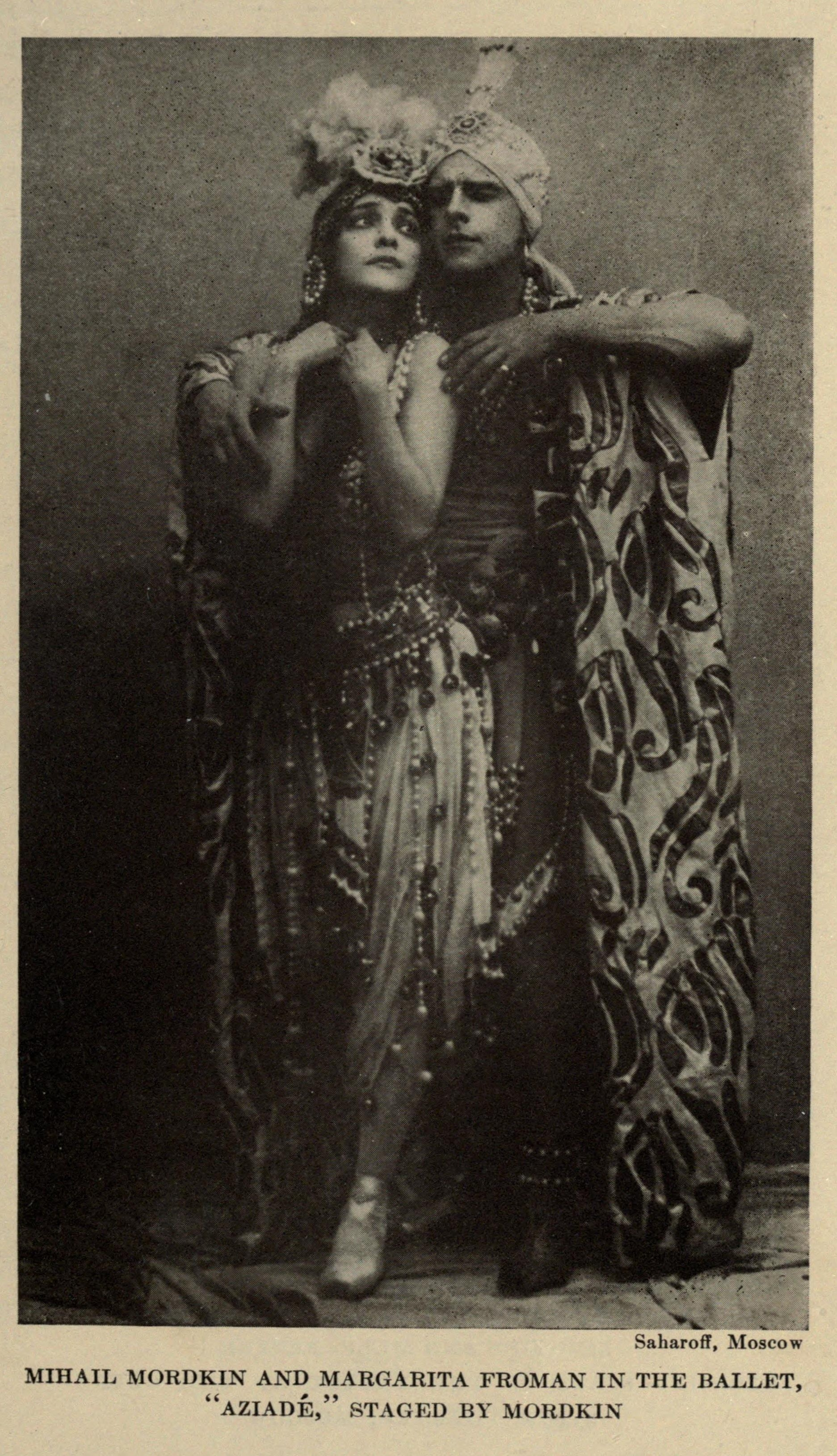
- Margarita Froman and Mikhail Mordkin, from a 1922 publication.
- Born: November 8, 1890; Moscow, Russia
- Died: March 24, 1970 (aged 79); Boston, Massachusetts, US

Margareta Petrovna Froman (8 November 1890 – 24 March 1970), known professionally as Margarita Froman, was a Russian and Yugoslav ballet dancer, dance educator and choreographer.

== Biography ==
Margarita Froman was born in Moscow on November 8, 1890. Her father was of Swedish descent and a professional musician (a trumpeter). While touring in Russia, he married a Russian woman and decided to remain in the country. He subsequently played in symphony orchestras and taught at the Moscow Conservatory. The Froman family had six children, five of whom dedicated their lives to the arts: Margarita and her brothers, Maximilian and Valentin, became ballet dancers; her brother Pavel became a theatrical set designer; and her sister Olga became a pianist.

In 1909, Margarita Froman graduated from the Moscow Imperial Theatrical School and joined the company of the Bolshoi Theatre in Moscow. There, she performed as a partner to her teacher, Vasily Tikhomirov, appearing in ballets such as Don Quixote, Coppélia, The Sleeping Beauty, and others.

She participated in Sergei Diaghilev’s enterprise, appearing in the premiere of the ballet Le Dieu bleu (The Blue God) on May 13, 1912, at the Théâtre du Châtelet. She was among the lead performers, alongside Vaslav Nijinsky, Tamara Karsavina, and Lydia Nelidova. In 1914, she was engaged by Diaghilev for his ballet company's tours of Europe and the USA.

She returned to Russia following the February Revolution of 1917. In 1918, she performed with Mikhail Mordkin and appeared in an early Russian silent film Aziade.

Shortly thereafter, Froman left Moscow for the Crimea, where she established a ballet school and gave a series of performances. Amidst the turmoil of the Russian Civil War, she was forced to emigrate. Traveling through Constantinople, Margarita eventually reached the Kingdom of Serbs, Croats and Slovenes (the future Yugoslavia). She settled in Zagreb with her small troupe, which included Maximilian Froman, Olga Orlova, Julia Bekefi, Anna Redel, and Natalya Miklashevskaya.

Beginning in January 1921, Froman’s troupe started performing at the Croatian National Theatre. Margarita not only performed leading roles but also embarked on a career as a choreographer, director, and pedagogue. Her work in Zagreb spanned approximately thirty years and exerted a significant influence on the development of Croatian ballet.

She introduced a new repertoire to the local audience, staging Les Sylphides in 1921, as well as excerpts from Swan Lake and the full ballet Coppélia. In 1922, she staged Scheherazade and Les Papillons by Michael Fokine, along with the Polovtsian Dances from the opera Prince Igor. In subsequent years, she produced scenes from The Nutcracker (1923), and the ballets Petrushka (1923), Thamar (1923), The Carnaval (1924), and many others.

In 1925, Margarita Froman toured Europe with Anna Pavlova’s company. From 1927 to 1930, she worked at the National Theatre in Belgrade, where she directed the ballet company. During this tenure, she staged ten ballets — including Petrushka and The Firebird — and choreographed the ballet sequences for several operas.

She retired from her career as a ballerina in 1934, subsequently focusing on choreography and production. Her work during this period extended beyond Zagreb, as she accepted engagements in Milan, Paris, London, and Vienna.

Margarita Froman collaborated extensively with Yugoslav composers, playing a key role in the creation of national ballets. As early as 1923, she staged Božidar Širola’s ballet Shadows (Sjene), followed by Krešimir Baranović’s The Gingerbread Heart (Licitarsko srce, 1924) and Imbrek with a Nose (Imbrek z nosom, 1935). She also produced Lujo Šafranek-Kavić’s Figurines (Figurine, 1926), Boris Papandopulo’s Gold (Zlato, 1930), and, in 1931, the first version of the most famous Croatian ballet, Fran Lhotka’s The Devil in the Village (Đavo u selu).

Beginning in the 1930s, Margarita also turned her attention to opera direction, staging approximately thirty operas and operettas at the Croatian National Theatre. Her directorial repertoire included Sadko, Eugene Onegin, Die Fledermaus, Faust, The Bartered Bride, and The Queen of Spades, among others. A significant milestone was her direction of Jakov Gotovac’s opera Ero s onoga svijeta (Ero the Joker), which premiered in 1935. For this production, she also choreographed the iconic final dance, the "Kolo".

In 1949, Froman choreographed the dance sequences for Branko Marjanović's film The Flag (Zastava). The lead role was played by her student, Sonja Kastl.

Throughout her decades of work in Zagreb, Margarita was dedicated to the training of young ballet dancers. Her students included some of the most prominent figures in Croatian ballet, such as Mia Slavenska, Ana Roje, Oskar Harmoš, and Milko Šparemblek, all of whom went on to become leading figures in the field.

In 1955, she choreographed several productions by the Yugoslav National Opera and Ballet for their London tour: Prince Igor, Romeo and Juliet, The Devil in the Village, Ero the Joker and The Gingerbread Heart.

Froman moved to the United States in 1955, and taught with her brother Maximilian at the Froman Professional School of Ballet in New London, Connecticut. She also taught at the Hartford Conservatory and the University of Connecticut.

Margarita Froman lived in Willimantic, Connecticut for her last 13 years. She died in 1970, aged 79, in Boston. Her papers were donated to the University of Connecticut by her sister, Olga. Her grave is in the Russian Orthodox Cemetery in Willimantic.

== Notable students ==
- Mia Slavenska
- Ana Roje
- Sonja Kastl
- Olga Orlova
- George Skrigin
- Oskar Harmoš
- Olga Kononovich (Stark)
- Natalia Miklashevskaya
- Irena Aleksandrovska-Strozzi
- Julia Bekefi
- Anna Redel (Khrustaleva)
- Natalia Branitskaya
- Nina Bryukhovetskaya
- Vera Reyzen
