= Galeta =

Galeta is a surname. Notable people with the surname include:

- Hotep Idris Galeta (1941–2010), South African jazz pianist and educator
- Ivan Ladislav Galeta (1947–2014), Croatian artist, cinematographer, and film director

== See also ==
- Galeta Island (disambiguation)
