= Božidar Rašica =

Božidar Rašica (28 December 1912 – 13 September 1992) was an architect, scenographer and painter.

== Career ==
Rašica was born in Ljubljana, Slovenia, to Serbian parents. He studied in Rome, Belgrade, Warsaw and finally Zagreb, where he graduated in 1942. He was one of the founding members of the Exat 51 group whose active members between 1950 and 1956 were architects Bernardo Bernardi, Zdravko Bregovac, Vjenceslav Richter and Vladimir Zaharović, and painters Vlado Kristl, Ivan Picelj and Aleksandar Srnec. From 1966 he worked as a professor at the Faculty of Architecture in Zagreb. He designed numerous residential, pavilion and school buildings. Of particular interest are the pavilions at the Zagreb International Fair and residential and business buildings in Zagreb (Savska and Vukovarska Street). He designed the Zagreb Hippodrome which was built between 1947 and 1950. He renovated the buildings of the Gavella Theatre, the Revlin fortress and the Croatian National Theatre in Zagreb and in Split. He received an international architectural award in 1965 for the German Democratic Republic pavilion project.

At the beginning of his painting career he used intimate and colouristic expression. In the 1950s he turned to pure abstract art (the Exat 51 period). At the beginning of the 1970s he returned to figurative art. The subjects of Rašica's paintings were often the seaside settings and landscapes that surrounded him: Zagreb, Dubrovnik and its surrounding islands, Paris and the Istrian landscapes and townscapes for example, Vrsar. He designed around 50 stage sets for theatre shows, and costumes for Croatian and international theatres, including Covent Garden in London, the Rockefeller Centre in New York and Schiller Theatre in Berlin.

He participated in numerous group and solo exhibitions and projects in Croatia and abroad, and received several national and international honours and awards: for example, he was the recipient of the Vladimir Nazor Award for architecture and urbanism in 1978. He died in Zagreb, Croatia.

== The Božidar Rašica Collection ==
The Božidar Rašica Collection was founded in 2004 as part of the Museum of Modern and Contemporary Art in Rijeka thanks to the donation by the artist's wife, Vera Marsić.

== Published works on Božidar Rašica ==
- Maković, Zvonko, Marsić, Vera & Selem, Petar, Božidar Rašica, (Školska knjiga, Zagreb, 2009).
