= Jasna Horvat =

Croatian writer, cultural theorist and professor

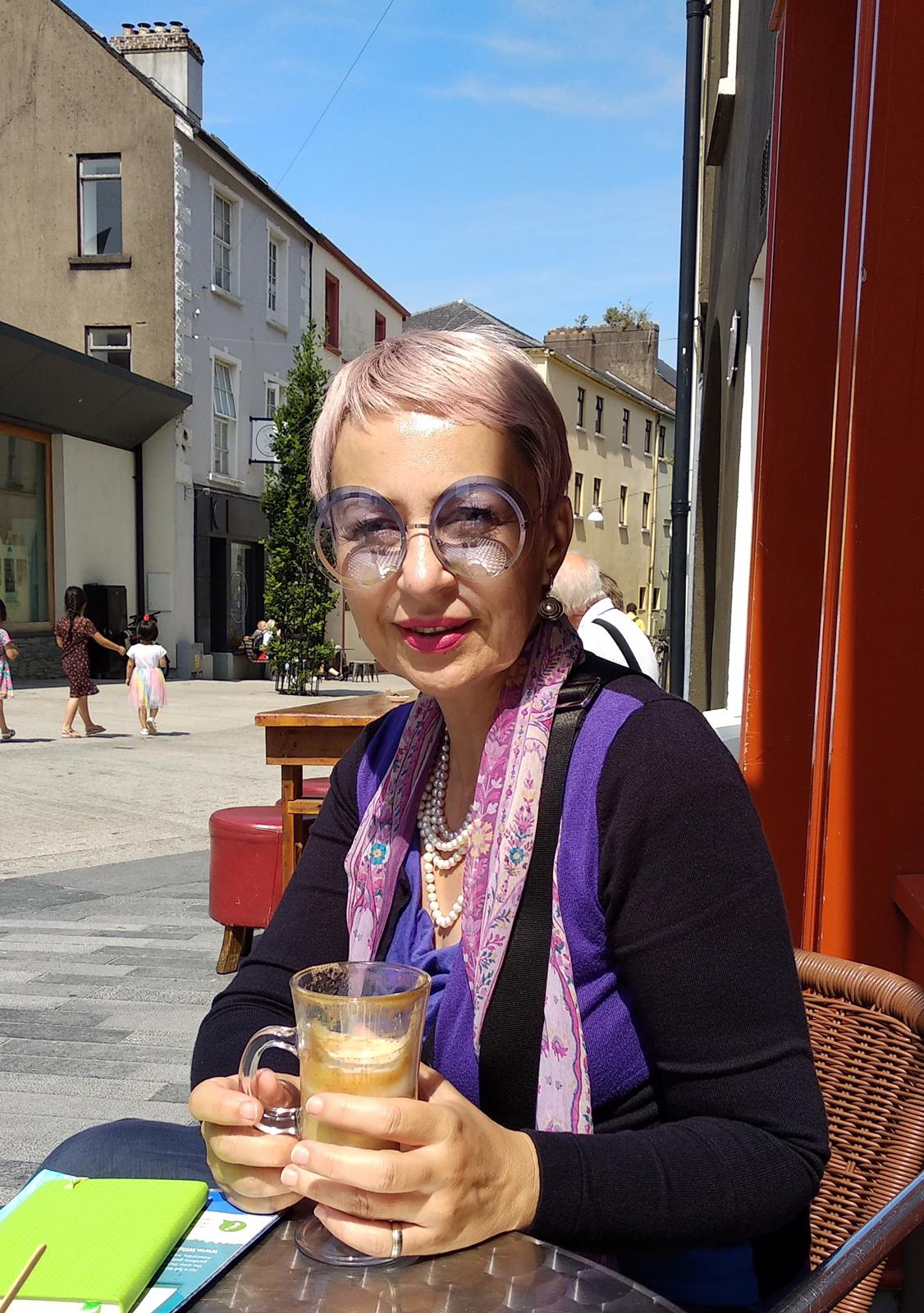
- Jasna Horvat
- Born: 27 December 1966 (age 59); Osijek, Croatia
- Occupations: Writer, cultural theorist

Jasna Horvat (27 December 1966) is a Croatian writer, cultural theorist, and professor at the University of Osijek. She writes novels, essays, and books for children and youth, as well as academic works. Most of her works have been assessed as Oulipian.

== Biography ==
Jasna Horvat was born 27 December, 1966 in Osijek.

She studied at the Faculty of Economics, University of Osijek, where she graduated (1989) and was employed as an assistant at the Department of Cybernetics, Mathematics and Statistics (1990). Following the completion of her postgraduate studies, she obtained her master's degree on January 23, 1992 from the Faculty of Economics in Osijek, and she earned her doctoral degree (26 May 1997) also from the Faculty of Economics in Osijek by defending her dissertation before a committee which included her advisor, as well as an international member, Anuška Ferligoj, a full professor at the University of Ljubljana.

She was in-charge of various scientific initiatives. The creation of the CATI Center, a research platform for gathering, analyzing, and interpreting statistical data, was one such effort. She has participated in numerous scientific conferences in the fields of social sciences and the humanities and has been a recipient of international scholarships and an invited lecturer. In 2012, she was appointed scientific adviser and attained the position of full professor with tenure in the scientific area of social sciences, in the field of economics, and in the branch of quantitative economics. She is also the founder and vice president of Andizet, Institute for Scientific and Artistic Research in the Creative Industries.

== Literary work ==
She is a member of the Society of Croatian Writers, the Croatian Association of Researchers of Children's Literature, Matica hrvatska and the Croatian Statistical Society.

Her literary work started with a collaboration with the Children's Theater Branko Mihaljević in Osijek in the late 1990s. At that time, the Drama Studio of the children's theater was staging the play “Putem sunca”, which was later renamed “Svevidovim tragom” (Tracing Svevid) and appeared in “Izgubljena vila (Lost Fairy), a book of two dramatized texts published by Matica hrvatska in 2002. After the Lost Fairy, in 2005, Naklada Ljevak published Alemperkina kazivanja (Gemfeather’s Sayings) – her interpretation of the mythology of Sučić with illustrations by Pika Vončina.

The book of letters exchanged with Irena Vrkljan Pismo u pismu (A Letter in a Letter), (Naklada Ljevak, 2008) is a confirmation of a friendship revived through letters. The novels Az (Naklada Ljevak, 2009), Bizarij (The Bizarrium), (Naklada Ljevak, 2009), Auron (Naklada Ljevak, 2011), Vilikon (Naklada Ljevak, 2012), Alikvot (Algoritam, 2014), Vilijun (Naklada Ljevak, 2016), Atanor (Naklada Ljevak, 2017) and OSvojski (Naklada Ljevak, 2019) point to Jasna Horvat's penchant for experiments manifested primarily in the conceptualization of the novelistic form.

Her works for children – Izgubljena vila (Lost Fairy) (Matica hrvatska, 2002.), Alemperkina kazivanja (Gemfeather’s Sayings), (Naklada Ljevak, 2005) and Krijesnici(The Bonfires), (Algoritam, 2009) – thematize the mythological concept of the Croatian Pantheon, adapt it to children, and through the illustrations of Pika Vončina they become easily remembered traditions.

In the novel Az (2009), which received the award for literature from the Croatian Academy of Arts and Sciences (2010), Jasna Horvat popularizes the Glagolitic script by incorporating it into the plot of a novel on a lexical, numerical and symbolic level. Bizarij (The Bizarrium) – a novel about the phantasmagoria of connectedness – Jasna Horvat uses conjunctions to point to the grammatical codification of intimate and historical attachments to topos. In this case, the city of Osijek is chosen for its topos and the famous bizarre former residents of Osijek are the bearers of the symbolic correspondence with the conjunctions as a part of speech. The conceptual variations of this author culminate in Auron where the golden ratio is built not only into the text structure but also into the life of the novel's main protagonist Auron. Captions in the margins of the novel are filled with details about the auron concept of beauty and thereby, with captions in the margins, Auron's readers receive a wealth of information about the golden ratio format – auron – as well as its most diverse occurrences. The lexicon novel of the fairies – Vilikon, is a mixture of two cultural stories: one narrated by Marco Polo and one interpreted by Kubla Khan, Marco's listener. The lexicon entries of the fairies, supernatural beings of the Kingdom of Croatia, are told by the use of a magic square of 12. The novel Alikvot is built on the study of Vladimir Mažuranić and in its contents completes an unfinished novel by Ivana Brlić Mažuranić Jaša Dalmatin, potkralj Gudžerata. This novel also brings The Manifesto of Axiomatic Literature by which the writer clarifies the doctrine on which she based her opus.

Horvat is dedicated to the fostering, research and promotion of the Croatian cultural heritage. She sees herself as determined by the Information Age, while critics compare her works with the works of Italo Calvino and often assess them as Oulipian narratives.

After Vilijun – the permuted novel of Vilikon – the oeuvre of Jasna Horvat has been marked by the compound term Ars Horvatiana thus confirming its construction and uniqueness in contemporary Croatian literature. The novel Atanor is constructed according to the structure of the periodic system of elements and represents a unique combination of literature and knowledge of (al) chemistry. The novels Vilijun and Atanor have established this Croatian author as the originator of “smart literature” which requires the use of a smartphone or QR code reader for full-text retrieval.

Since 2012, she has been a member of the committee for the Dr. Ivan Šreter Award, an annual Croatian linguistics award for the best Croatian language word coined. She has presented Croatian Literature at the inaugural launch of the EU-China International Literary Festival which was held in 2017 in Beijing and Chengdu. With her associates, she has published a bilingual publication Ars Andizetum, which is available also through open access and offers a new definition of the Creative Industry.

She also is the Co-Founder of RAZUM, founded in 2020, a marketing strategy company.

== Awards and honors ==
- Award of the Croatian Academy of Arts and Sciences HAZU for the novel Az (2010)
- The Great Seal of the City of Osijek for outstanding achievement in the field of literature Az (2011)
- 2016 National Science Award for Popularization and Promotion of Science for “Kreativna riznica” (Creative Treasure Trove) (2017)
- FUL KULTURNO: Superbrand award for the best branded low-budget project in culture – for “Happening Vilijun” (2018)

== Selected bibliography ==
- Ahorion, Naklada Ljevak, Zagreb, 2025. ISBN 978-953-355-850-9.
- OSvojski, Naklada Ljevak, Zagreb, 2019.
- Ars Andizetum (co-authorship with Josipa Mijoč and Ana Zrnić), Institute Andizet, Osijek, 2018.
- Atanor, Naklada Ljevak, Zagreb, 2017.
- Vilijun, Naklada Ljevak, Zagreb, 2016.
- Antiatlas, Naklada Ljevak, Zagreb, 2014.
- Alikvot, Algoritam, Zagreb, 2014.
- Nevidljivo nakladništvo (co-authorship with Nives Tomašević), Naklada Ljevak, Zagreb, 2012.
- Vilikon, Naklada Ljevak, Zagreb, 2012.
- Osnove statistike (co-authorship with Josipa Mijoč), Naklada Ljevak, Zagreb, 2012 and 2014.
- Auron, Naklada Ljevak, Zagreb, 2011.
- Az, Naklada Ljevak, Zagreb, 2009. (award the Croatian Academy of Sciences and Arts for 2010)
- Bizarij, Naklada Ljevak, Zagreb, 2009.
- Krijesnici, Algoritam, Zagreb, 2009.
- Pismo u pismu (co-authorship with Irena Vrkljan), Naklada Ljevak, Zagreb, 2008.
- Alemperkina kazivanja, Naklada Ljevak, 2005., illustrations Pika Vončina (special praise in the 2006 catalog of selected titles of children's literature)
- Izgubljena vila, Matica hrvatska, Osijek, 2002.
- Statistika s pomoću SPSS/PC+, Osijek, 1995.

== Selected essays and studies ==
- Semiotički marketing Konstantina Ćirila Filozofa: glagoljičko prezentiranje kršćanstva kao preteča suvremenog semiotičkog marketinga, coauthors: Nives Tomašević and Slaven Lendić
- Intenzitet prenesena iskustva u stvaranju akademske proze Dubravke Oraić Tolić
- ARTICLE Beliefs in Equality for Women and Men as Related to Economic Factors in Central and Eastern Europe and the United States
- Economic Influences on Ideals About Future Jobs in Young Adults in Formerly Socialist Countries and the United States
- Tematsko-motivske veze u stvaralaštvu Vladimira Mažuranića i Ivane Brlić-Mažuranić, co-authored with A. Kos-Lajtman
- Ivana Brlić-Mažuranić, "Priče iz davnine": nova konstrukcija izvora i metodologije; co-authored with A. Kos-Lajtman
- Lik i djelo Svetog Konstantina Ćirila Filozofa u romanu Az; co-authorship with Nives Tomašević
- Book as a Souvenir: Partnership Between Tourism Potentials, Cultural Identity, Promotion and Publisher's Profits; co-authorship with Mijoč, Horniš, Tomašević

Horvat, Jasna; Mijoč, Josipa; Kalazić. Zorislav

- Digital CCI Exchange: Paradigm, Concept and Construction // European Union Future Perspectives: Innovation, Entrepreneurship & Economic Policy / Zenzerović, Robert; Černe, Ksenija; Rabar, Danijela (ur.). Pula: Juraj Dobrila University of Pula, 2016. str. 381–394
