= Monument to the victory of the people of Slavonia =

- Serbo-Croatian: Spomenik revolucionarnoj pobjedi naroda Slavonije, Spomenik narodu-heroju Slavonije
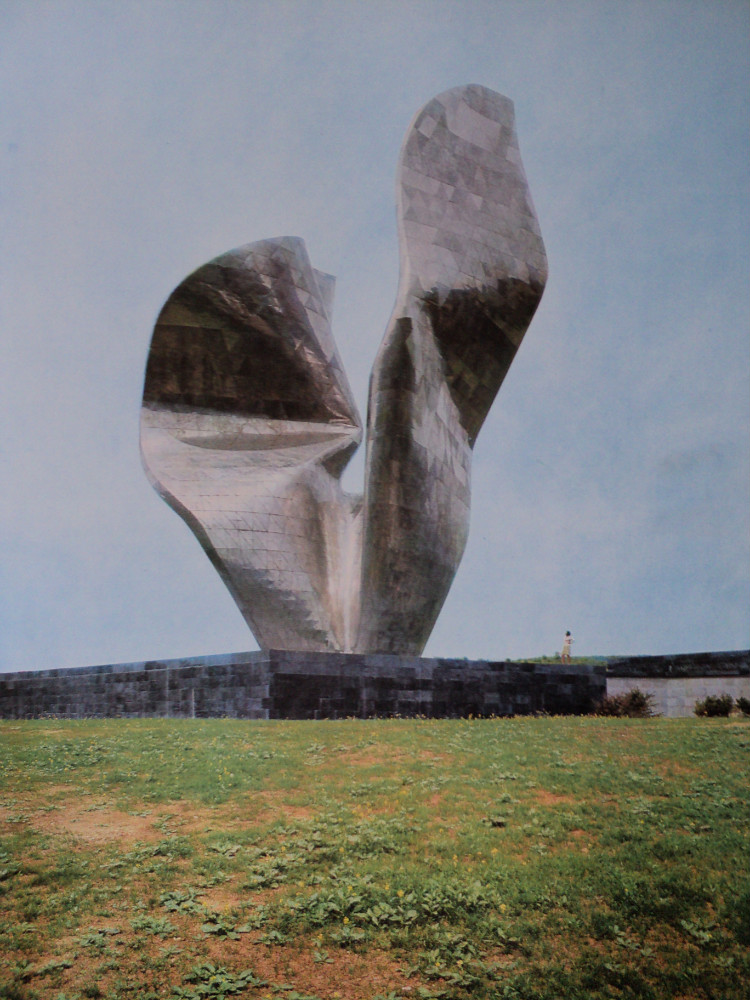
- Monument to the victory of the people of Slavonia in 1977
- Location: Kamenska, Brestovac, Croatia
- Coordinates: +45.446222°N +17.476778°E
- Designer: Vojin Bakić
- Type: Sculpture
- Height: 30 m
- Beginning date: 1957
- Completion date: 1968
- Dismantled date: 1992

Monument to the revolutionary victory of the people of Slavonia or Monument to the people-hero of Slavonia was a World War II memorial sculpture by Vojin Bakić, that was located in the, now uninhabited, Serbian village of Kamenska, Brestovac, Slavonia, Croatia. It was destroyed by the Armed Forces of Croatia in 1992.

== History ==
It was built over a decade, from 1957 to 1968. At the time of its opening it was the largest postmodern sculpture in the world. It was dedicated to the people of Slavonia during World War II and made of stainless steel. The opening ceremony was performed on 9 November 1968 and attended by Yugoslav president Josip Broz Tito.

Boris Medja, a renowned mechanical and shipbuilding engineer and expert in ship structure vibrations, worked alongside Bakić from 1958 to 1988, made the demanding static and structural calculations for the monument.

== Demolition ==
During the disintegration of Yugoslavia in 1991, the works of Vojin Bakić were on the "list" for monuments to be demolished. In 1992, an unprecedented culturicide occurred when, according to eyewitnesses, the commander of the 123rd Brigade of the Croatian Army, Major Miljenko Crnjac, ordered the demolition of the monument on February 21. The monument was completely demolished only after the ninth attempt with further explosives.

== See also ==
- List of Yugoslav World War II monuments and memorials in Croatia
