= Vjenceslav Richter =

Croatian architect

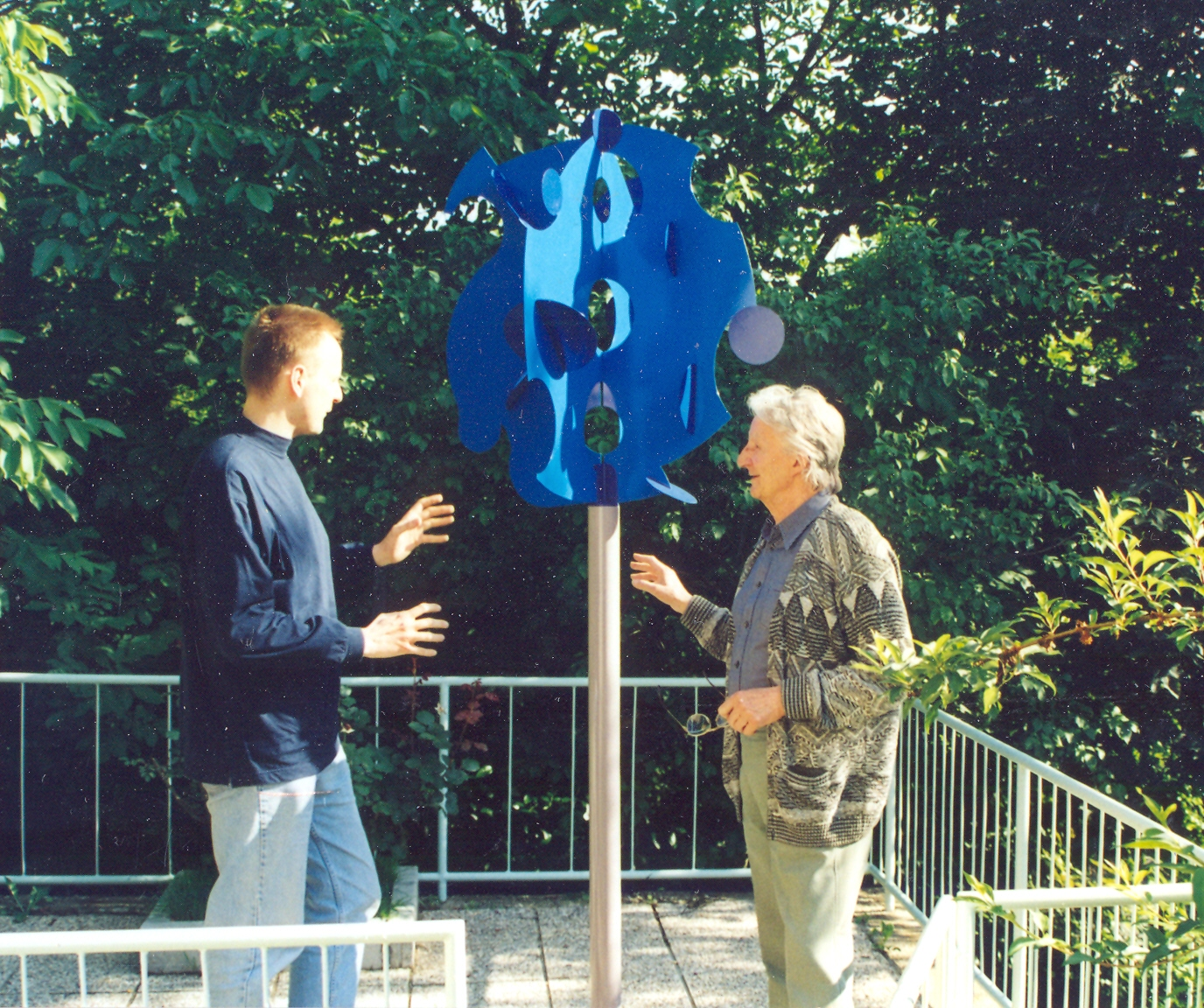
Vjenceslav Richter (right) and art critic Ante Vranković on the terrace of Richter's home in Zagreb, spring 2000.

Vjenceslav Richter (Croatian pronunciation: [rîxter]; 8 April 1917 – 2 December 2002) was a Croatian architect. He was also known for his work in the fields of urbanism, sculpture, graphic arts, painting, and stage design.

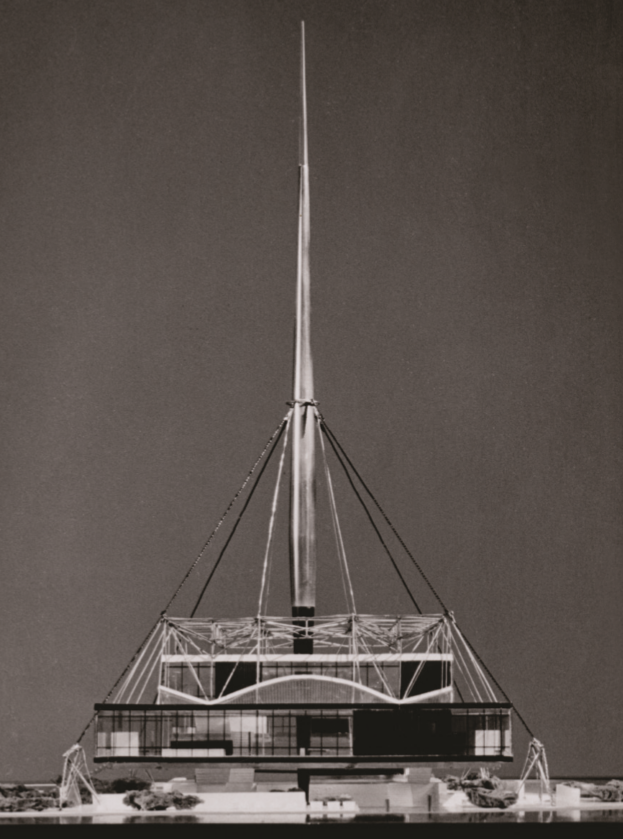
Vjenceslav Richter: Original project for Yugoslav Pavilion on EXPO 1958., Bruxelles

== Career ==
In 1949, Richter graduated at the Department of Architecture of the Technical Faculty of the University of Zagreb under professor Zdenko Strižić.

He was one of the founding members of the Exat 51 group whose active members between 1950 and 1956 were the architects Bernardo Bernardi, Zdravko Bregovac, Božidar Rašica and Vladimir Zaharović, and the painters Vlado Kristl, Ivan Picelj and Aleksandar Srnec. He was also a member of the New Tendencies movement (from 1961). He designed exhibition pavilions (Bruxelles 1958, Turin and Milan), several museum buildings, and was involved in industrial and interior design. From 1962 he began to explore the medium of sculpture, which resulted in the Reliefmeter series among many other works of art.

In 1955, Vjenceslav Richter organized the first Zagreb Triennial, an art and design festival that sought to bring together a wide range of design disciplines, including applied arts, industrial design, and fine arts. The second triennial was not held until four years later, and was equally unsuccessful in its aim of popularising modernist design.

He exhibited at many shows in Croatia and abroad, including: the Museum of Arts and Crafts, Zagreb, (1964), Albright-Knox Art Gallery, Buffalo, (1968), Museum of Contemporary Art, Zagreb, (1968), Staempfly Gallery, New York, (1968), Galerie Semiha Huber, Zurich, (1969), at the Venice Biennale (1972), Gallery 58, Rapperswill, (1972), Galleria del Naviglio, Milan, (1973), Galleria all Centro, Napoli, (1973), Galleria Visconti, Milan, (1976) and Galleria La Loggia, Udine, (1977).

He won many awards, including the City of Zagreb Award (1959), the Golden Medal at the 13th Triennial in Milan (1964), the 11th São Paulo Biennale Award for Sculpture (1971), and the Herder Prize (1981). He received two life achievement awards: the Viktor Kovačić Award (1988) and the Vladimir Nazor Award (1993). Geometry and Spontaneity, a retrospective exhibition of his graphics, was organized at the HAZU (Croatian Academy of Sciences and Arts) Cabinet of Graphics (Zagreb, 2002).

== The Richter Collection ==
The Vjenceslav Richter and Nada Kareš-Richter Collection is housed in a villa in Vrhovec, Zagreb, and administrated by the Museum of Contemporary Art in Zagreb.

== Bibliography ==
- Ed. Susovski, Marijan, Richter Collection: The Conceptual Spaces of Vjenceslav Richter's Art Synthesis/Catalogue of the Richter Collection, (Museum of Contemporary Art, Zagreb, 2003).
