= Hartford Conservatory =

Coordinates: 41.7702°N 72.6923°W

The Hartford Conservatory was a performing arts school in Hartford, Connecticut, that operated from 1890 to 2011. It offered programs in music, dance, musical theater and recording arts to post-secondary students on a pre-professional level. Its small student body, diverse in age, background and geographical area of origin, pursued immersion studies in music and dance with a jazz emphasis. Some of its students became prepared nationally known performers and teachers.

The Hartford Conservatory was one of the nation’s oldest performing arts schools. It was founded in 1890 at the Hartford Theological Seminary as the School for Church Musicians. Five years later it became the independent Hartford School of Music. In 1934, Truda Kaschmann, a student of Mary Wigman, brought modern dance to the school. It later became known as the Hartford Conservatory and provided not only a community program of weekly instruction in music and dance for all ages and levels, but also an accredited two- and three-year post-secondary immersion program in music, dance, theater and recording arts.

The Conservatory was an active part of the musical life of Hartford, and the home of orchestra and vocal groups that formed a major part of the arts scene especially in the first half of the twentieth century. Not only sacred and secular classical music performances, but city premieres of avant-garde works were presented under Conservatory sponsorship in collaboration with the Wadsworth Atheneum’s Chick Austin and other Hartford notables.

In its last thirty years of operation, the school had acquired a jazz and popular music emphasis, teaching jazz dance and music, and offering holiday performances of Duke Ellington’s Jazz Nutcracker with the New England Jazz Septet and student choreographers, musicians and dancers, and sponsoring master classes with dance artists like Jacques d'Amboise and Savion Glover.

The school had a small student body of fewer than one hundred students of varied ages, backgrounds and geographic regions of the country and the world, and a faculty all currently performing in their respective fields. Among the artists that have been part of the Conservatory as students or teachers over the past 120 years are:

- Betty Allen, opera singer and former director of Harlem School of the Arts
- James Argiro, jazz pianist
- choral director Ralph Baldwin
- bassist Dezron Douglas
- bassist Dave Santoro
- guitarist Norman Johnson
- Guitar Arnold Landsberg
- composers Brooke Halpin and Dan-O
- Conducting Robert Brawley
- Jazz Piano Ray Cassarino
- pianists Ward Davenny and Grayson Hugh
- Piano Geraldine Douglass
- Piano Aaron Pratt, Jr.
- Popular Organ Sy Quinto (Silvio Giaquinto)
- vocalists Alyson Bristol, and Teresa Stich-Randall
- Voice Mildred Coleman
- cellists Charles Krane and John Riley
- percussionist Alexander Lepak
- Percussion Donald Minutillo
- Cirque du Soleil choreographer Michael Montanaro
- dancers Douglas Boulivar, Margarita Froman and Alwin Nikolais
- composer Gwyneth van Anden Walker

The conservatory's board of trustees voted in September 2010 to close in May 2011, the end of the 2010-2011 academic year, allowing current students to graduate. School officials attributed the decision to a "mix of competitive and economic factors, not the least of which is the venerable institution's business model."
