= Milivoj Solar =

Croatian literary theorist and literary historian (1936–2025)

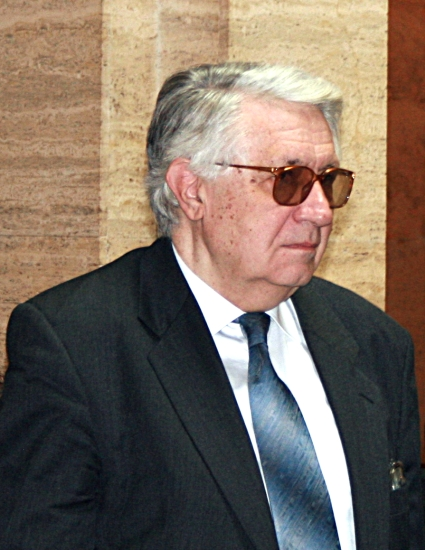
Milivoj Solar in 2008

Milivoj Solar (8 April 1936 – 16 September 2025) was a Croatian literary theorist and literary historian.

== Life and career ==
Solar was born in Koprivnica. At the University of Zagreb Faculty of Humanities and Social Sciences he earned a degree in philosophy and Yugoslav studies in 1959. At the same faculty he received his PhD in 1964 with a thesis on Fran Galović.

From 1963 he worked as an assistant, then as a docent and as an associate, and finally from 1976 as a full tenured professor of literature theory and methodology of the study of literature at the Department for Comparative Literature. In the period of 1987-1990 he also served as SR Croatia's minister of education and culture.

Solar died on 16 September 2025, at the age of 89.

== Work ==
Solar's scholarly work is primarily concerned with literary theory, especially the issues of poetics and the relationship between literary theory and philosophy. He also published works on the methodology of literary studies, literature analysis and universal elements of cultural history such as myths.

He published the following books:

- Pitanja poetike (Školska knjiga, Zagreb, 1971)
- Ideja i priča (Liber, Zagreb, 1974; 2nd enlarged ed. Znanje, Zagreb, 1980)
- Književna kritika i filozofija književnosti (Školska knjiga, Zagreb, 1976)
- Teorija književnosti (Školska knjiga, Zagreb, 1976; 20th ed. 2005)
- Uvod u filozofiju književnosti (Studentski centar Sveučilišta u Zagrebu, Zagreb, 1978)
- Smrt Sancha Panze (Nakladni zavod Matice hrvatske, Zagreb, 1981)
- Suvremena svjetska književnost (Školska knjiga, Zagreb, 1982; 1990, 3rd revised and enlarged ed. 1997)
- Mit o avangardi i mit o dekadenciji (Nolit, Beograd, 1985)
- Eseji o fragmentima (Prosveta, Beograd, 1985)
- Filozofija književnosti (Liber, Zagreb, 1985)
- Roman i mit (August Cesarec, Zagreb, 1988)
- Teorija proze (Liber, Zagreb, 1989)
- Laka i teška književnost (Matica hrvatska, Zagreb, 1995; 2nd ed. 2005)
- Vježbe tumačenja (Matica hrvatska, Zagreb, 1997; 2nd ed. 2005)
- Edipova braća i sinovi (Naprijed, Zagreb, 1998)
- Granice znanosti o književnosti (Naklada Pavičić, Zagreb, 2000)
- Povijest svjetske književnosti (Golden marketing, Zagreb, 2003)
- Predavanja o lošem ukusu, (Politička kultura, Zagreb, 2004)
- Ideja i priča (Collected works, 1st book, Golden marketing-Tehnička knjiga, Zagreb, 2004)
- Uvod u filozofiju književnosti (Collected works, 2nd book, Golden marketing-Tehnička knjiga, Zagreb, 2004)
- Retorika postmoderne (Matica hrvatska, Zagreb, 2005)
- Rječnik književnoga nazivlja (Golden marketing-Tehnička knjiga, Zagreb, 2006)
- Književni leksikon (Matica hrvatska, Zagreb, 2007)

Solar was a regular member of the Croatian Academy of Sciences and Arts from 2008, member of the Croatian Writers' Association and the Croatian Philosophic Society.

He was a winner of the Zagreb City Award in 1972, Award "Božidar Adžija" in 1975, Vladimir Nazor Award in 1977 and HAZU award in 2004 for the book Povijest svjetske književnosti ('History of world literature').

== Sources ==
- Solar's biography at the Matica hrvatska's website
