= Milko Šparemblek =

Croatian dancer and choreographer (1928–2025)

- Born: 1 December 1928; Prevalje, Kingdom of Serbs, Croats and Slovenes (modern-day Slovenia)
- Died: 25 February 2025 (aged 96)
- Occupations: Dancer, choreographer, stage director, film director
- Years active: 1947–2025
- Known for: Theatre, television, film

Milko Šparemblek (1 December 1928 – 25 February 2025) was a Slovenian-born Croatian dancer, choreographer, stage director, and film director. He made about 40 ballet films and to date there have been about 150 premieres of his work in over 50 theatres around the world. Šparemblek received a number of awards including a Vladimir Nazor Lifetime Achievement Award and a Distinguished Artist Award from the International Society for the Performing Arts.

== Background ==
Šparemblek was born in Prevalje on 1 December 1928, as an only child. At the age of three, his family moved to Zagreb, Croatia to a neighbourhood called Kustošija. He enrolled in the V. high school of Zagreb and participated in athletics. He attended the University of Zagreb to study Comparative literature, that same year starting to dance at the Zagreb Opera (later known as the Croatian National Theatre) under the direction of choreographers and dancers Ana Roje and Oskar Harmoš.

Šparemblek died on 25 February 2025, at the age of 96.

== Career around the work ==
In 1948 Šparemblek joined the Croatian Ballet ensemble at the Croatian National Theatre where he studied classical, contemporary and folkloric dances. Four years later in 1952, he was promoted to Ballet Soloist by recommendation of Dame Ninette de Valois and in 1953 he left Zagreb for Paris on a Franco-Yugoslav Scholarship. He studied under Olga Preobrajenska, a graduate of the Imperial Ballet School in Moscow, and later under Serge Peretti in the Paris Opera School of Ballet. After completing his scholarship, he began dancing in small cabarets, music halls and working as an extra in movie production in order to pay for his studies.

Šparemblek became a member of several different ballet companies, including the Janine Charrat company, the Maurice Béjart company, the Ballet de l'Étoile, the Milorad Miskovitch company and the Ludmila Tcherina company. In 1956 he choreographed his first ballet called "L'Échelle".

In New York he studied contemporary dance techniques under Jose Limon and Marhe Graham.

== Career as a choreographer ==
Šparemblek was a Ballet Master in Brussels under the director M. Bejart in the Ballet de XX. Sc. He was a Director of the Lisbon Gulbekian Ballet and he was a Director of Ballet in the New York Metropolitan Opera Director of Ballet in the Lyon Opera the Lyon. In 1985, he choreographed Pastoral - 6th Symphony of Beethoven - world premiére, for the ballet company Ballet Teatro Guaíra, in the city of Curitiba, state of Paraná, in Brazil, which was also performed in Rio de Janeiro and São Paulo. He was also a director of Ballet in the Zagreb Croatian National Theatre, where in 2012 he choreographed the Miraculous Mandarin, and in 2014 he choreographed a production of the comedy "The good soul of Sichuan" by the Zagreb Municipal Theatre.

== Awards ==
Year	Title	Work
1976	Biennial of Graphic Arts, Ljubljana	Trionfo di Afrodite
1979	Biennial of Graphic Arts, Ljubljana	Symphony of Psalms
1981	Biennial of Graphic Arts, Ljubljana	Pjesme Ljubavi i Smrti; Songs of Love and Death
1981	Prix Anik Award, Montreal	The Miraculous Mandarin
1983	The Canadian Music Counsel	Lifetime achievement
1986	Josip Štolcer Slavenski Award	Carmina Krležiana
1986	Slovenian Theater Scholars Award	Lifetime achievement
1986	Prešeren Award	Triptih Beethoven-Wagner
1987	The City of Zagreb Award	Making and realisation of the 1987 Universiade "or the 15th annual Universiade"
1988	Biennial of Graphic Arts, Ljubljana	Carmina Krležiana
1990	Vladimir Nazor Award	Mozart: Amadeus - Monumentum:;ask what this is
1997	Croatian Theatre Award?!?!hrvatsko glumiste	Overall artistic activity
1998	Order of Croatian Danica with a figure of Marko Marulić	Lifetime achievement
2001	Tito Strozzi Award	Johannes Faust Passion
2002	Vladimir Nazor Award	Life Achievement
2003	Marul Award	Kraljevo (Krleža)
2005	X2 Mare Nostrum Awards	Lifetime achievement
2005	Croatian Theatre Award?!?!hrvatsko glumiste	Fric and the Singer
2007	Pio and Pina Mlakar Award	60 years of Artistic Achievements
2010	International Society for the Performing Arts – Distinguished Artist Award	Lifetime Achievement
2013	Croatian Theatre Award?!?!hrvatsko glumiste	The Miraculous Mandarin
2020	Prešeren award	Lifetime achievement

== Television and film production ==
Year	Production	Title and Artist	Role
1958	Baden-Baden TV	"Fontessa" with modern jazz quartet	Choreography With V. Sulich
1960	TV Belge (RTBF)	Monteverdi: "Orfeo"	Choreography
1961	TV Belge (RTBF)	Kelemen: "Heros et Son Miroir"	Dramaturgy, Dance and Choreography
1961	Sociète Monarch	"Les Amants De Teruel"	Directed By R. Rouleau; Music By Teodorakis, Sauget (Premiere At Theatre Sarah Bernard 1959); Dance, Choreography and Leading Male Role
1962	ORTF Paris	Šipuš: "Zone Interdite"	Dance and Choreography
1963	TV Belge (RTBF)	Stravinski: "Histoire de Soldat“	Dance and Choreography
1963	ORTF Paris	D'Annunzio, Debussy: "Martyr de St. Sebastien"	Choreography
1963	TV Köln-Düsseldorf	Poulenc : "Masken"	Choreography
1964	TV Zagreb (RTZ)	R. Wagner: "Mathilde"	Dance and Choreography
1964	TV Köln-Düsseldorf	Brecht, Weill: "7 Todtsunden"	Choreography
1964	ORTF Paris	Rameau: "Pygmalion"	Choreography
1964	Saar TV	"Swingle Singers"	Dance and Choreography
1965	München TV	Kaper: "Lili"	Choreography
1965	ORTF Paris	Claudel, Honegger: "Jeanne au Bucher"	Choreography
1966	ORTF Paris	Cocteau, Auric: "Phedre"	Dance, Choreography and Co-Direction
1966	ORTF Paris	Ducas: "La Peri"	Dance and Choreography
1966	ORTF Paris	Terrasse: "Mons. de La Palice"	Choreography
1966	München TV	Labiche, Offenbach: "Chapeau de Paille d'Italie"	Choreography
1967	ORTF Paris	Brecht, Weill: "7 Peches Capitaux"	Dance, Choreography and Direction
1968	ORTF Paris	Tasso, Monteverdi: "Combatimento"	Choreography and Direction
1968	ORTF Paris	Molière, Lully: "Bourgeois Gentilhomme"	Choreography
1969	ORTF Paris	Ray, Kaufman: "La Bague"	Dance, Choreography and Co-Direction
1969	ORTF Paris	Henry: "Astronomy"	Choreography
1981	Montreal TV	Bartók: "Mandarin Merveileux"	Choreography
1984	TV Zagreb (RTZ)	Wagner: "Mathilde"	Dance and Choreography
1988	TV Zagreb (RTZ)	Chopin: "Chopiniade"	Choreography
1988	TV Zagreb (RTZ)	Ujević, Šparemblek, Savin: "Gesta Za Tina"	Dramaturgy, Choreography and Direction
1989	RTV Ljubljana	Gallus: "Enigma Gallus"	Dramaturgy, Choreography and Direction
1994	RTV Slovenija	Tartini: "Trilo Del Diavolo"	Choreography
1995	RTV Slovenija	Vivaldi, Wagner: "Objem"	Choreography
1998	RTV Slovenija	Kumar: "Epitaf za Srečka"	Dramaturgy, Choreography and Direction
1999	TV Zagreb (HRT)	Mussorgsky: „Pjesme i Plesovi Smrti“	Choreography and Direction
2000	RTV Slovenija	Bach: "Toccata i Fuga u D-molu"	Choreography and Direction
