= Maximilian Froman =

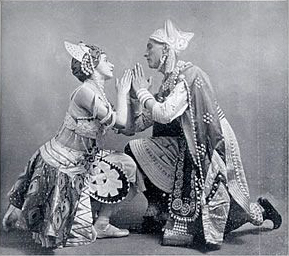
- Froman and Karsavina in Le Dieu bleu, 1912
- Born: 13 June 1889; Moscow, Russian Empire
- Died: 21 May 1971 (aged 81); New London, Connecticut, United States
- Occupations: Ballet dancer, choreographer, teacher

Maximilian Froman (Russian: Максимилиан Петрович Фроман; 13 June 1889–21 May 1971) was a Russian and Yugoslav ballet dancer, choreographer and teacher. He was a brother of the ballerina Margarita Froman.

== Biography ==
Froman was born in Moscow, at the time in the Russian Empire, on 13 June 1889 into a family of a musician of Swedish origin; he was one of six children, many of whom pursued careers in the arts.

He graduated from the Moscow Imperial Theatre School and was a soloist of the Bolshoi Theatre from 1907 to 1917. In 1918 he performed in Kyiv. From 1911 he also performed with Sergei Diaghilev's Ballets Russes.

In 1921 he moved to Zagreb, where he performed at the Croatian National Theatre. He was a character dancer noted for his strong technique. He frequently appeared in productions by his sister Margarita Froman, including the premieres of Gingerbread Heart (1924) and Imbrek with a Nose (1935) by Krešimir Baranović.

Among Froman's most notable roles were parts in ballets by Mikhail Fokine, including Scheherazade, Petrushka and Polovtsian Dances.

From 1927 to 1929 he was a leading soloist at the National Theatre in Belgrade.

Between 1940 and 1945 he headed the ballet of the Slovak National Theatre in Bratislava. During this period he staged Scheherazade, Les Papillons, Polovtsian Dances, Les Sylphides and The Sleeping Beauty. He also introduced the Slovak premieres of Baranović's ballets Imbrek with a Nose and Gingerbread Heart.

He was married to Olga Chaletzky.

In 1949, after the Second World War, Froman emigrated to the United States, where he founded the Froman Professional Ballet School.

He died on 21 May 1971 after a long illness at his home in New London, Connecticut. He was buried at Cedar Grove Cemetery in New London.

== See also ==
- Margarita Froman
