= Jagoda Buić =

Croatian visual artist (1930–2022)

- Born: 14 March 1930; Split, Yugoslavia
- Died: 17 October 2022 (aged 92); Venice, Italy
- Education: Academy of Fine Arts Vienna
- Occupations: Fiber artist, costume designer
- Awards: Herder Prize (1976); Vladimir Nazor Award (2014)

Jagoda Buić (14 March 1930 – 17 October 2022) was a Croatian visual artist best known for her monumental fiber art installations and tapestries, which won her critical acclaim in the latter half of the 20th century.

== Early years ==
Born in the coastal city of Split, Buić studied at the Zagreb Academy of Fine Arts and Art History at the University of Zagreb before graduating in interior architecture and scenography, textiles and costume design at the Academy of Fine Arts Vienna in 1953. After graduation she studied film set design at the Cinecittà studio in Rome and the history of costume design at the International Centre for Arts and Costume housed at Palazzo Grassi in Venice.

== Work ==
Buić worked on more than 120 projects as a costume and stage designer in various opera, ballet, theatre and film productions at various theatres in Vienna, Zagreb, Osijek, Dubrovnik and Split. In 1965, at the Lausanne Biennial of Textile Art, Buić impressed contemporary art critics with her first textile installation which was immediately bought by the Stedelijk Museum Amsterdam. She continued to exhibit her monumental textile works at art shows and contemporary art museums around the world, becoming known for vast installations made out of textile cords, hemp and wool, and experiments with unusual surface textures and space. From the 1970s, Buić, together with Polish artist Magdalena Abakanowicz, was credited with pioneering innovative textile forms in contemporary arts.

In the 1980s she started using metals in her sculptures and installations, and in the 2000s she turned to using collages of assorted materials, including paper, cardboard, wool, etc.

Buić's work was included in the 2021 exhibition Women in Abstraction at the Centre Pompidou.

== Death ==
Buić died on 17 October 2022 at her home in Venice, Italy, of an unspecified illness. She was 92.

== Awards ==
Buić won numerous awards for her work, including the Grand Prize at the São Paulo Art Biennial, the Herder Prize (1976), and the Vladimir Nazor Award for Life Achievement (2014).
