= Stella Skopal =

Croatian Jewish sculptor (1904–1992)

- Born: 18 July 1904; Zagreb, Kingdom of Croatia-Slavonia, Austria-Hungary
- Died: 24 December 1992 (aged 88); Zagreb, Croatia
- Occupation: Sculptor

Stella Skopal (18 July 1904 – 24 December 1992) was a Croatian Jewish sculptor.

Skopal was born in Zagreb on 18 July 1904. From 1924 to 1928, she attended the Royal Academy of arts and crafts in Zagreb, at which she was taught by Hinko Juhn, Ivo Kerdić, Frano Kršinić and others. In 1929, Skopal was also educated in Vienna, and from 1933 to 1934 in a private school of Hertha Bucher. Skopal debuted in 1927, with the ceramic sculpture of amorous couple which was modeled along the art lines of her professor Hinko Juhn. From 1927 to 1939, she performed over twenty artistically very interesting fireplaces and stoves mainly for the upper class Jewish families in Zagreb. Among the most significant were those depicting virtuoso modeled female figures in dance, at the apartment of Blühweiss family in Domagojeva street 2. In 1938, Skopal was first in Croatia to create ceramic jewelry. At the beginning of 1940 to mid-1950, created numerous ceramic tables of which only few were saved to this day. From 1951 to 1956, she worked on the ceramic bottles, among others for the "Maraska d.d." which produces liqueurs and spirits. For that she received a number of commendations, both at home and abroad. The largest part of her artistic oeuvre was committed to shaping ceramic items for the daily use such as: bowls, jars, services, vases, lamps, candlesticks, and others.

During World War II, as a Jew, Skopal was placed in the ceramic factory "Gabianelli" in Treviso, Italy. After the capitulation of Italy, Skopal joined the Partisans. With the Partisans, she worked at the Bari allied military hospital and later in Cozzano as the ceramist. After the war, from 1945 to 1965, Skopal worked as the professor at the School of applied arts in Zagreb. She taught the modeling and creating forms on the potter's wheel.

Many works of Stella Skopal disappeared without a trace during her lifetime, while others are kept at the Museum of Arts and Crafts, Croatian National Theatre and Croatian History Museum in Zagreb, Jewish Community Zagreb, Art Gallery in Split and private collectors.

Skopal died on December 24, 1992, and was buried at the Mirogoj Cemetery.

== Honors ==
In 1975, Skopal received the Vladimir Nazor Award for lifetime achievement.

== Bibliography ==
- Snješka Knežević, Aleksander Laslo (2011). Židovski Zagreb. Zagreb: AGM, Židovska općina Zagreb. ISBN 978-953-174-393-8.
- Baričević, Marina (2009). Stella Skopal. Zagreb: Printera grupa. ISBN 978-953-6898-69-5.
