= Kamenska =

- Village
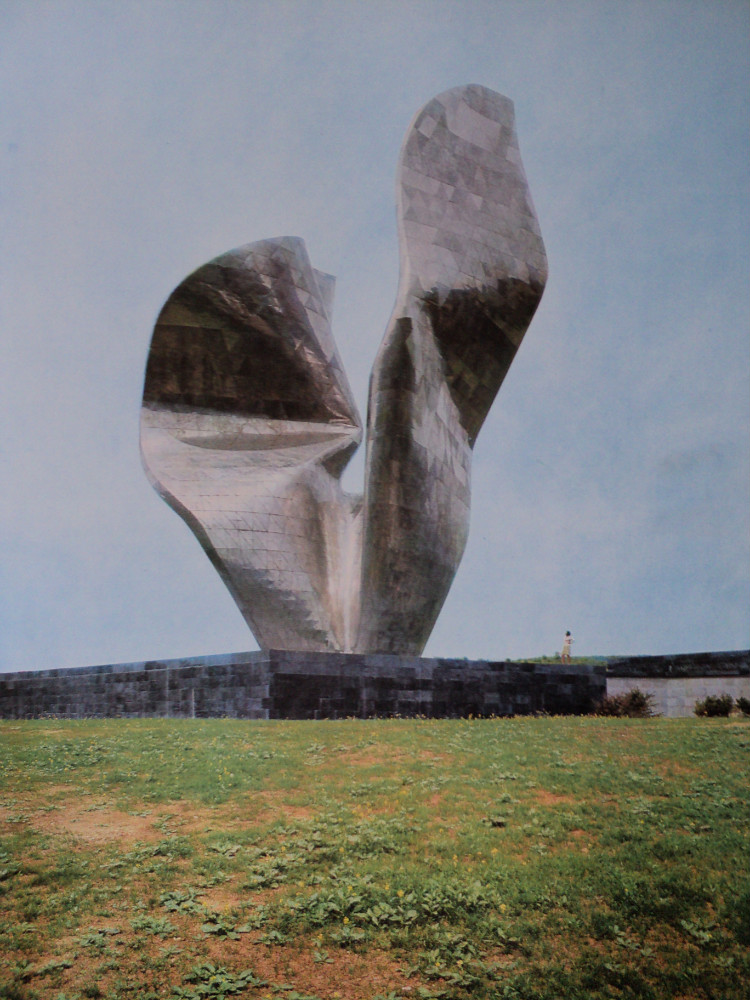
- Monument to the victory of the people of Slavonia

- Location within Croatia
- Coordinates: 45°26′39″N 17°28′46″E
- Country: Croatia
- Region: Slavonia
- County: Požega-Slavonia County
- Municipality: Brestovac

Area
  - Total: 0.5 km^{2} (0.19 sq mi)
- Elevation: 237 m (778 ft)

Population (2021)
  - Total: 5
  - Density: 10/km^{2} (26/sq mi)
- Time zone: UTC+1 (CET)
  - Summer (DST): UTC+2 (CEST)
- Postal codes: 34320 Orljavac
- Area code: (+385) 34

Kamenska is an uninhabited village in Požega-Slavonia County, Croatia. Kamenska is administered as a part of the Brestovac municipality. The village is connected by the D38 state road.

== Demographics ==
According to the 2011 census, the village of Kamenska is no longer inhabited.

The 1991 census recorded that 92.50% of the village population were ethnic Serbs (37/40), 2.50% were ethnic Croats (1/40), and 5.00% were of other ethnic origin (2/40).

Historical population 1857–2011
v

population	19	46	62	106	46	78	23	35	18	33	76	65	47	40	1
	1857	1869	1880	1890	1900	1910	1921	1931	1948	1953	1961	1971	1981	1991	2001	2011

Sources: Croatian Bureau of Statistics publications

== Sights ==
- Monument to the victory of the people of Slavonia
