= Ivan Ladislav Galeta =

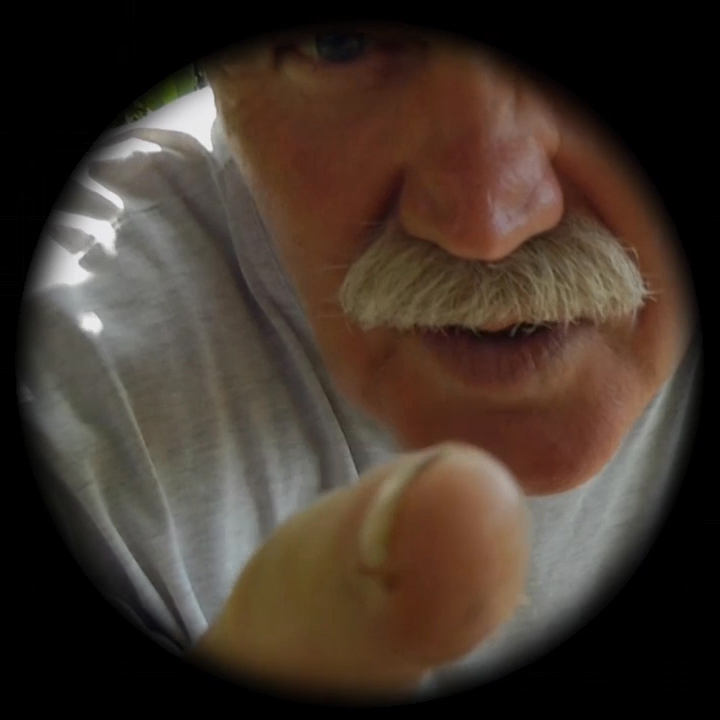
- Born: 9 May 1947; Vinkovci, PR Croatia, FPR Yugoslavia
- Died: 7 January 2014 (aged 66); Zagreb, Croatia
- Known for: Video art, experimental film, new media art
- Awards: Vladimir Nazor Award for Life Achievement in Visual Arts (2011)

Ivan Ladislav Galeta (9 May 1947 – 7 January 2014) was a Croatian multimedia artist, cinematographer and film director.

== Biography ==
Galeta lived in Kraj Gornji, where he worked on his Endart projects, and was a professor at the Academy of Fine Arts in Zagreb. He graduated from Zagreb's School of Applied Arts and Design (Department of Applied Graphics) (1967), from the teacher training college in Zagreb (1969), and from the studies of pedagogy sciences at the Faculty of Philosophy in Zagreb (1981). In the last few years, he created pieces of internet art.

== Filmography ==
- WAL(L)ZEN (1989), 35 mm
- Water Pulu 1869 1896(1988), 35 mm
- Two Times in One Space(1985), 35 mm
- PiRâMidas 1972-1984 (1984), 35 mm
- sfaira 1985-1895 (1984), 35 mm

== Videography ==
- TV ping-pong (1975/78)
- Video radovi / Video works (1977/78)
- Media Game 1 (1978)
- Drop (1979)
- Railway station – Amsterdam (1979)
- Lijnbaangracht Centrum (1979)
- No 1, 2,3,4 (1979)
- Post Card (1983)
- Pismo / Letter (1995)
- Endart No 1 (2000)
- Endart No 2 (2001)
- Endart No 3 (2003)
- Endart No 4 (2004)
