= Aleksandar Srnec =

Croatian artist

- Aleksandar Srnec in 2001
- Born: 30 July 1924; Zagreb, Kingdom of Serbs, Croats and Slovenes
- Died: 27 March 2010 (aged 85); Zagreb, Croatia
- Known for: Painting, graphic design, sculpture
- Movement: New media art, Op art

Aleksandar Srnec (30 July 1924 – 27 March 2010) was a Croatian artist. He is mainly known for his avant-garde designs and kinetic and lumino kinetic art.

Srnec was one of the founding members of the Exat 51 group whose active members between 1950 and 1956 were the architects Vjenceslav Richter, Bernardo Bernardi, Zdravko Bregovac, Božidar Rašica and Vladimir Zaharović and the painters Vlado Kristl and Ivan Picelj. He made abstract art based on the use of geometric shapes. In 1953, he designed his first kinetic objects entitled, Space Modulator, while in 1956, he began his experiments with moving sculptures and reliefs.

In the 1960s, Srnec participated in the New Tendencies exhibitions. From 1962, he became involved with luminal-kinetic experiments, for example Luminoplastic I, and from 1968, he began making "ambience art". His work entitled Luminoplastic Ambience, exhibited in 1967, in Gallery SC, (Student Centre Gallery) in Zagreb, was the first luminal-kinetic object/ambience in Croatian art. He collaborated with the Zagreb School of Animated Films and made sets for three puppet films. He also made the animated film A Man and His Shadow together with Dragutin Vunak.

In the period from 1974 to 1977, he returned to making kinetic sculptures in highly polished metals. He also began experimenting with light. He exhibited at many shows in Croatia and abroad: Zagreb (1953, 1967, 1969, 1971, 1978, 1979, 1983, 1992), Belgrade (1953, 1956, 1968, 1971), Banja Luka (1972), Paris (1959), London (1960, 1961) and Mannheim (1971). His retrospective exhibition Present Absence was held in two cities: at the Gallery of Old and Contemporary Masters and at Varteks facilities in Varaždin, (2008) and at the Museum of Contemporary Art, Zagreb, (2010). He received many awards, including the Vladimir Nazor Award for life achievement (1999) and the Croatian Association of Artists Life Achievement Award (2008).
