= Galeta Island =

Galeta Island may refer to:

- Galeta Island (Panama)
- Galeta Island (Algeria), in the Mediterranean Sea
