= Irena Vrkljan =

Croatian writer (1930–2021)

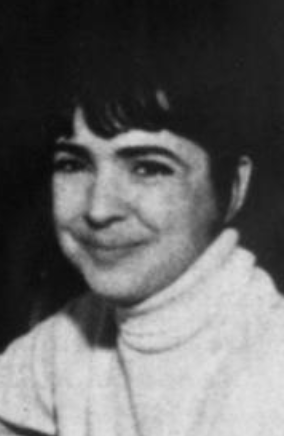
- Irena Vrkljan, from a 1964 publication of the US State Department
- Born: 21 August 1930; Belgrade, Yugoslavia
- Died: 23 March 2021 (aged 90)
- Occupations: Writer, television producer

Irena Vrkljan (21 August 1930 – 23 March 2021) was a Croatian writer and translator.

She was born in Belgrade and was educated at Zagreb University and the Deutsche Film- und Fernsehakademie Berlin. She lived in both Zagreb and Berlin, writing in both Croatian and German. Vrkljan wrote scripts for film and radio. She also translated works by Croatian authors into German. In 1964, she toured the United States, sponsored in part by American Women in Radio and Television.

In 2006, she was awarded the Vladimir Nazor Award.

== Selected works ==
- Paralele (Parallels), poetry (1957)
- Doba prijateljstva (Time of friendship), novel (1963)
- Soba, taj strašni vrt (The room, this frightful garden), poetry (1966)
- U koži moje sestre (In my sister's skin), poetry (1982)
- Svila, škare, autobiography (1984), translated as The silk, the shears, and Marina, or, About biography, received the Ksaver Šandor Gjalski Prize
- Marina ili o biografiji, autobiography (1985), translated as Marina or On Memory
- Dora, ove jeseni (Dora), novel (1991)
- Pred crvenim zidom: 1991-1993 (Before the red wall: 1991–1993), novel 1994
- Posljednje putovanje u Beč (The last trip to Geneva), mystery novel (2000)
