= Ana Roje =

Croatian ballet dancer (1909–1991)

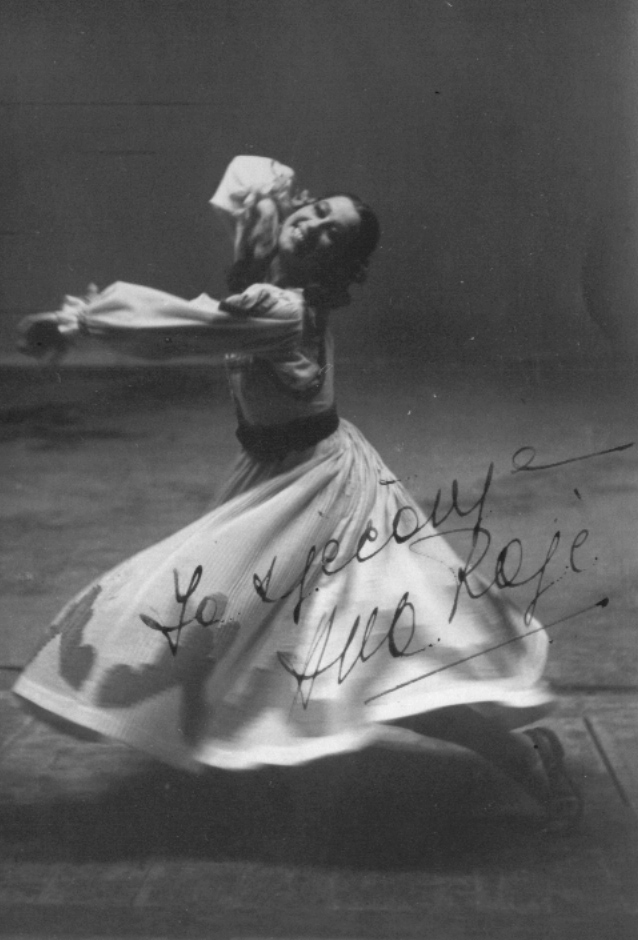
- Born: 17 October 1909; Split
- Died: 17 March 1991 (aged 81); Šibenik
- Occupation: Ballet dancer
- Spouse(s): Oskar Harmoš
- Awards: Vladimir Nazor Award; Order of the Republic

Ana Roje (17 October 1909 – 17 March 1991) was a Croatian ballet dancer.

Ana Roje was born on 17 October 1909 in Split, Croatia. Initially a self-taught dancer, she made her debut in Split in 1926, dancing in the operettas Die Bajadere and Countess Maritza by Emmerich Kálmán and Kraljica lopte by Ivo Tijardović. She was at the Croatian National Theatre in Zagreb 1927 to 1929 and appeared in minor roles, including a role in the 1928 Croatian premiere of The Firebird by Igor Stravinsky. She studied under a number of teachers, including Margarita Froman in Zagreb and Nicolas Legat in London. She joined the Ballet Russe de Monte Carlo in 1938 and the Original Ballet Russe for their tour of Australia and New Zealand.

She and her husband Oskar Harmoš spent the next decade in Yugoslavia, founding schools and ballet companies in Split and Zagreb. She appeared in two prominent leading roles, Maria in The Fountain of Bakhchisarai by Boris Asafyev in 1947 and Juliet in Romeo and Juliet by Sergei Prokofiev in 1948.

In 1959 she founded the Bermuda Ballet Festival and danced her last public performance there in 1960.

Roje died on 17 March 1991 in Šibenik, Croatia.
