= Sonja Kastl =

- Born: 14 July 1929 (age 96); Zagreb, Kingdom of Yugoslavia, (now Croatia)
- Occupations: Actress, dancer, choreographer

Sonja Kastl (born July 14, 1929) is a Croatian film and stage actress, teacher, dancer and choreographer.

== Early and personal life ==
Kastl was born in Zagreb on July 14, 1929, to a Croatian Jewish family of Đuro and Josipa Kastl. Her father was an architect and her mother was an opera singer. Kastl's mother abruptly ended her career because of her husband and his family's disapproval. Kastl's family has relative connections with Croatian politician Stjepan Radić. From her second marriage with doctor Boris Zimermann, Kastl had a 22-year-old daughter Mirjana who was killed in a car accident.

== Career ==
Kastl began dancing at the age of five in the rhythmic school of Mirjana Janeček Stropnik. As a schoolgirl, she danced in the theater "Children's empire". In this theater Kastl sang and danced in the ballets "Little Red Riding Hood", "Three girls" and "Queen of dolls". In 1944, Kastl began her professional ballerina career at the Zagreb Opera Ballet. From 1947, she danced the solo roles. In 1949, Kastl acted in the film "Flag", where she embodied the character of a promising young ballerina Marija. She has performed in ballets such as Sleeping Beauty, Ballad of Medieval Love, Romeo and Juliet, Coppélia, Cinderella, The Slaughter of the Amazons, The Miraculous Mandarin and The Devils of Loudun. With the last one she has traveled the world together with choreographers Pio and Pina Mlakar. At 35, Kastl abandoned her career as a dancer due to a knee injury. Soon after she became the director of the ballet at the Croatian National Theatre in Zagreb. Over the next 40 years she worked at the choreography. In 2007, her memoir "To dance is to live" was released, written by singer and writer Davor Schopf and dancer and ballet critic Mladen Mordej Vučković.

== Honors ==
In 1991, Kastl received the Vladimir Nazor Award for her lifetime achievement.

== Bibliography ==
- Snješka Knežević, Aleksander Laslo (2011). Židovski Zagreb. Zagreb: AGM, Židovska općina Zagreb. ISBN 978-953-174-393-8.
