= Ivan Picelj =

Croatian painter, sculptor and graphic designer

- Born: 28 July 1924; Okučani, Kingdom of Yugoslavia
- Died: 22 February 2011 (aged 86); Zagreb, Republic of Croatia
- Known for: painting, sculpture, graphic design
- Movement: EXAT 51
- Awards: Order of Danica Hrvatska

Ivan Picelj (28 July 1924 – 22 February 2011) was a contemporary Croatian painter, sculptor, and graphic designer.

Picelj developed a specific variation of geometric abstraction in Croatian painting by using primary colours and by reducing the shapes to geometric elements. He made sculptures and reliefs in wood and in metal (since 1957). The multiplication of the basic plastic unit within a regular grid is one of his trademark procedures.

He was one of the founders and members of the group EXAT 51 which, in the period 1950–1956, consisted of the architects Vjenceslav Richter, Bernardo Bernardi, Zdravko Bregovac, Božidar Rašica and Vladimir Zaharović, and the painters Vlado Kristl and Aleksandar Srnec. He was also a member of the Industrial Design Studio – SIO (1956). He is one of the founders of the New Tendencies movement, and he participated in the production and exhibited at the New Tendencies exhibitions in Zagreb (1961–67). He spent a lot of time in Paris where he collaborated with the Denise René Gallery. He also involved himself in graphic design (posters and books) from the mid-1960s and published four graphic maps: 8 seriographies (1957), Oeuvre programmeé (1966), Cyclophoria (1971) and Géométrie élémentaire (1973). He organized the first industrial design exhibition in Zagreb in 1955 and helped design the Yugoslavian pavilions for national and international exhibitions.

He exhibited at many solo (since 1952) and group shows, such as the Venice Biennale (1969, 1972), A Century of Avant-garde Art in Middle and Eastern Europe (Bonn, 1994), Constructivism and Kinetic Art (Zagreb, 1995), Ivan Picelj – Graphic Art Opus 1957–2003, International Centre of Graphic Arts (MGLC), (Ljubljana, 2003), Picelj, Denise René Gallery (Rive Gauche, Paris, 2008). His works are part of the museum collections at the Museum of Modern and Contemporary Art, Rijeka, the Museum of Contemporary Art, Zagreb, the Muzeum Sztuki in Łódź, the International Centre of Graphic Arts in Ljubljana, the Museum of Modern Art, New York. Many works also belong to many private collections such as the Filip Trade Collection, Croatia. He received the Vladimir Nazor Award for "Life Achievement" (1994).

Ivan Picelj was born in Okučani and died in Zagreb.
