= List of Croatian films of the 1970s =

This is a list of the feature films produced in Croatia between 1970 and 1979.

For an alphabetical list of articles on Croatian films see Category:Croatian films.

== Films by year ==
=== 1970 ===
English title	Croatian title	Director(s)	Company	Main cast
	Bablje ljeto	Nikola Tanhofer	Dalmacija / Kinematografi	
	Jedanaesta zapovijed	Vanča Kljaković	Jadran	
Passing Days	Idu dani	Fadil Hadžić	Jadran	
The Fed One	Hranjenik	Vatroslav Mimica	Jadran	
One Song a Day Takes Mischief Away	Tko pjeva zlo ne misli	Krešo Golik	Croatia	Franjo Majetić, Mirjana Bohanec, Relja Bašić, Mia Oremović
The Way to Paradise	Put u raj	Mario Fanelli	Jadran / RTZ	
	Družba Pere Kvržice	Vladimir Tadej	Croatia	

=== 1971 ===
English title	Croatian title	Director(s)	Company	Main cast
Gold, Frankincense and Myrrh	Mirisi, zlato i tamjan	Ante Babaja	Jadran	
The Scene of the Crash	Putovanje na mjesto nesreće	Zvonimir Berković	Jadran	
The Pine Tree in the Mountain	U gori raste zelen bor	Antun Vrdoljak	Jadran	

=== 1972 ===
English title	Croatian title	Director(s)	Company	Main cast
The Deer Hunt	Lov na jelene	Fadil Hadžić	FAS	
	Prvi splitski odred	Vojdrag Berčić	Adria	
	Živa istina	Tomislav Radić	FAS	
	Poslijepodne jednog fazana	Marijan Arhanić	Jadran	
	Vuk samotnjak	Obrad Gluščević	Jadran	

=== 1973 ===
English title	Croatian title	Director(s)	Company	Main cast
	Kužiš stari moj	Vanča Kljaković	Jadran	
A Performance of Hamlet in the Village of Mrdusa Donja	Predstava Hamleta u Mrduši Donjoj	Krsto Papić	Jadran	
	Razmeđa	Krešo Golik	RTZ / Croatia	
	Timon	Tomislav Radić	Jadran	
To Live on Love	Živjeti od ljubavi	Krešo Golik	Croatia	
Chronicle of a Crime	Kronika jednog zločina	Lordan Zafranović	Adria	

=== 1974 ===
English title	Croatian title	Director(s)	Company	Main cast
	Deps	Antun Vrdoljak	Jadran	
Captain Mikula, the Kid	Kapetan Mikula mali	Obrad Gluščević	Jadran	
Whichever Way the Ball Bounces	Kud puklo da puklo	Rajko Grlić	Jadran	

=== 1975 ===
English title	Croatian title	Director(s)	Company	Main cast
	Hitler iz našeg sokaka	Vladimir Tadej	Jadran/ Croatia	
The House	Kuća	Bogdan Žižić	Jadran/ Croatia	
Passion According to Matthew	Muke po Mati	Lordan Zafranović	Jadran/ Croatia	
The Day That Shook the World	Atentat u Sarajevu	Veljko Bulajić	This table is incomplete; you can help by adding missing items.	
Anno Domini 1573	Seljačka buna	Vatroslav Mimica	Jadran/ Croatia	

=== 1976 ===
English title	Croatian title	Director(s)	Company	Main cast
	Vlak u snijegu	Mate Relja	Croatia	
The Rat Savior	Izbavitelj	Krsto Papić	Jadran	

=== 1977 ===
English title	Croatian title	Director(s)	Company	Main cast
	Pucanj	Krešo Golik	Jadran / Croatia	
Fliers of the Open Skies	Letači velikog neba	Marijan Arhanić	Jadran / Croatia	
Crazy Days	Ludi dani	Nikola Babić	Jadran / Croatia	
Daredevil's Time	Hajdučka vremena	Vladimir Tadej	Jadran / Croatia	
Don't Lean Out the Window	Ne naginji se van	Bogdan Žižić	Jadran / Croatia	
Snowstorm	Mećava	Antun Vrdoljak	Jadran / Croatia	
Operation Stadium	Akcija stadion	Dušan Vukotić	This table is incomplete; you can help by adding missing items.	

=== 1978 ===
English title	Croatian title	Director(s)	Company	Main cast
Bravo Maestro	Bravo maestro	Rajko Grlić	Jadran / Croatia	
Violet	Ljubica	Krešo Golik	Croatia	
Occupation in 26 Pictures	Okupacija u 26 slika	Lordan Zafranović	Jadran / Croatia	
The Last Mission of Demolitions Man Cloud	Posljednji podvig diverzanta Oblaka	Vatroslav Mimica	Jadran / Croatia	
Court Martial	Prijeki sud	Branko Ivanda	This table is incomplete; you can help by adding missing items.	

=== 1979 ===
English title	Croatian title	Director(s)	Company	Main cast
The Man to Destroy	Čovjek koga treba ubiti	Veljko Bulajić	This table is incomplete; you can help by adding missing items.	
The Four Seasons	Godišnja doba	Petar Krelja	Zagreb	
Journalist	Novinar	Fadil Hadžić	Jadran / Croatia	
	Pakleni otok	Vladimir Tadej	Adria	
The Return	Povratak	Antun Vrdoljak	This table is incomplete; you can help by adding missing items.	
	Priko sinjeg mora	Ljiljana Jojić	Zagreb	
Slow Motion	Usporeno kretanje	Vanča Kljaković	Jadran	
That's the Way the Cookie Crumbles	Živi bili pa vidjeli	Bruno Gamulin Milivoj Puhlovski	Zagreb	
Whatever You Can Spare	Daj što daš	Bogdan Žižić	Jadran / Croatia	

== See also ==
- 1970s in Croatian television
- List of Croatian films of the 1960s
- List of Croatian films of the 1980s
