= List of Yugoslav films =

This is a list of the most notable Yugoslav cinema films.

== 1940s ==
Year	Title	Director
1947	Slavica	Vjekoslav Afrić
1948	Na svoji zemlji	France Štiglic
1949	Barba Žvane	Vjekoslav Afrić
1949	Zastava	Branko Marjanović

== 1950s ==
Title	Director	Cast	Genre	Notes
1950
Jezero	Radivoje-Lola Đukić			
1951
1952
Ciguli Miguli	Branko Marjanović		Comedy	Banned by the authorities until 1977
Frosina	Vojislav Nanovic	Meri Boskova; Aco Jovanovski; Ljuba Arsova; Petar Prlicko	Drama	
1953
Daleko je sunce	Radoš Novaković			
1954
The House on the Coast	Bosko Kosanovic	René Deltgen, Nadja Regin, Sybille Schmitz	Drama	Co-production with West Germany
1955
Hanka	Slavko Vorkapić			Entered into the 1956 Cannes Film Festival
1956
Ne okreći se sine	Branko Bauer	Bert Solar; Zlatko Lukman	Drama	Won Golden Arena for Best Film at Pula Film Festival (1956)
Valley of Peace	France Štiglic			Entered into the 1957 Cannes Film Festival
Ne okreći se sine	Branko Bauer			
1957
It Was Not in Vain	Nikola Tanhofer		Horror	Entered into the 7th Berlin International Film Festival
Subotom uveče	Vladimir Pogačić			
1958
H-8	Nikola Tanhofer	Đurđa Ivezić; Boris Buzančić; Antun Vrdoljak; Vanja Drach	Drama	Won Golden Arena for Best Film at Pula Film Festival (1958)
The Sky Through the Trees	Stole Janković			Entered into the 1st Moscow International Film Festival
La tempesta	Alberto Lattuada			
1959
Kapò	Gillo Pontecorvo	Susan Strasberg	Drama	Italian-French-Yugoslav co-production
Train Without a Timetable	Veljko Bulajić			Entered into the 1959 Cannes Film Festival

== 1960s ==
Title	Director	Cast	Genre	Notes
1960
A Corpse Hangs in the Web	Fritz Böttger	Alexander D'Arcy	Science fiction	The English version was featured in the last season of Mystery Science Theater 3000
The Ninth Circle	France Štiglic	Boris Dvornik	Drama	Nominated for an Academy Award for Best Foreign Language Film and entered into the 1960 Cannes Film Festival
Atomic War Bride (Rat)	Veljko Bulajic	Bata Živojinović	Science fiction	
The Fourteenth Day	Zdravko Velimirović			Entered into the 1961 Cannes Film Festival
Kapo	Gillo Pontecorvo			Italian-French-Yugoslav coproduction
Partizanske priče	Stole Janković			
Ljubav i moda	Ljubomir Radičević			
Bolje je umeti	Vojislav Nanović			
1961
And Love Has Vanished	Aleksandar Petrović			Entered into the 1962 Cannes Film Festival
Boatmen of Thessaloniki	Zhivorad Mitrovik	Ishtrev Begoli, Darko Damevski	Drama	Macedonian language film
Comrade President Center-Forward	Zorz Skrigin	Mija Aleksic; Olivera Marković; Severin Bijelić	Comedy	
Nebeski odred	Bosko Boskovic, Ilija Nikolic			Entered into the 2nd Moscow International Film Festival
Martin u oblacima	Branko Bauer			
Solunski atentatori	Žika Mitrović			
Parče plavog neba	Toma Janjić			
Leto je krivo za sve	Puriša Đorđević			
1962
Kozara	Veljko Bulajić			Entered into the 3rd Moscow International Film Festival
Trial	Orson Welles	Anthony Perkins	Drama / Fantasy	based on the novel by Franz Kafka
Taras Bulba	J. Lee Thompson	Yul Brynner; Tony Curtis	History / Adventure	about Cossack clan on the Ukrainian steppes
Treasure of Silver Lake		Lex Barker	Adventure	Eurowestern, based on the novel by Karl May
Naš avto	František Čap			
Prekobrojna	Branko Bauer			
Zvižduk u 8	Sava Mrmak			
1963
The Long Ships	Jack Cardiff	Richard Widmark; Sidney Poitier	Adventure	
Apache Gold		Lex Barker	Adventure	Eurowestern, based on the novel by Karl May
Ostrava	Jovan Živanović	Peter van Eyck; Elke Sommer	Drama	German–Yugoslav co-production
Kozara	Veljko Bulajić			
Desant na Drvar	Fadil Hadžić			
1964
Destination Death	Wolfgang Staudte			Entered into the 14th Berlin International Film Festival
Mad Summer	Obrad Gluščević	Beba Lončar; Milutin Mićović; Milena Dravić; Ljubiša Samardžić	Comedy	
Old Shatterhand	Hugo Fregonese	Lex Barker	Adventure	Eurowestern, based on the novel by Karl May
Prometheus of the Island	Vatroslav Mimica			Entered into the 4th Moscow International Film Festival
Last of the Renegades		Lex Barker	Adventure	Eurowestern, based on the novel by Karl May
Among Vultures		Stewart Granger	Adventure	Eurowestern, based on the novel by Karl May
Skoplje '63	Veljko Bulajić		Documentary	Screened at the 1964 Cannes Film Festival
Službeni položaj	Fadil Hadžić			
1965
Čovek nije tica	Dušan Makavejev		Drama	
Genghis Khan	Henry Levin	Omar Sharif	History / Adventure	depicting the life and conquests of the Mongol emperor Genghis Khan
The Oil Prince		Stewart Granger	Adventure	Eurowestern, based on the novel by Karl May
The Desperado Trail		Lex Barker	Adventure	Eurowestern, based on the novel by Karl May
Old Surehand		Stewart Granger	Adventure	Eurowestern, based on the novel by Karl May
1966
The Boy Cried Murder	George Breakston	Fraser MacIntosh, Veronica Hurst, Phil Brown, Tim Barrett	Crime	British-West German-Yugoslav co-production
The Climber	Vladan Slijepčević			Entered into the 5th Moscow International Film Festival
The Dream	Mladomir Puriša Đorđević			Entered into the 17th Berlin International Film Festival
Rondo	Zvonimir Berković	Relja Bašić; Milena Dravić; Stevo Žigon	Drama	Milena Dravić won a Silver Arena award for "Best Actor" at Pula Film Festival (1966)
Half-Breed		Lex Barker	Adventure	Eurowestern, based on the novel by Karl May
Winnetou and Old Firehand		Rod Cameron	Adventure	Eurowestern, based on the novel by Karl May
Tople godine	Dragoslav Lazić			
Orlovi rano lete	Soja Jovanović			
Kako su se voleli Romeo i Julija	Jovan Živanović			
1967
Love Affair, or the Case of the Missing Switchboard Operator	Dusan Makavejev	Eva Ras; Slobodan Aligrudic; Ruzica Sokic		
Skupljači perja	Aleksandar Petrović	Bekim Fehmiu; Olivera Vuco; Velimir 'Bata' Živojinović; Gordana Jovanović	Drama	Nominated for Best Foreign Language Film Oscar (1968) Won FIPRESCI Prize at Cannes Film Festival, Grand Jury Prize, Palme d'Or nom at the 1967 Cannes Film Festival. Golden Globes foreign nom (1969)
Playing Soldiers	Bahrudin Čengić			Was due to compete at the 1968 Cannes Film Festival
The Rats Woke Up	Živojin Pavlović			Won the Silver Bear for Best Director at Berlin
Steps Through Mist	Žorž Skrigin	Husein Čokić; Bora Todorović; Milan Srdoč	Partisan film	
1968
Innocence Unprotected	Dušan Makavejev	Dragoljub Aleksić		Won the Jury Grand Prix at Berlin
Biće skoro propast sveta	Aleksandar Petrović	Annie Girardot; Ivan Palúch; Mija Aleksić; Eva Ras	Drama	Nominated for a Palme d'Or (Golden Palm) at the 1969 Cannes Film Festival
U raskoraku	Milenko Strbac			Entered into the Berlin
Winnetou and Shatterhand in the Valley of Death		Lex Barker	Adventure	Eurowestern, based on the novel by Karl May
Podne	Puriša Đorđević			
Pre istine	Vojislav Kokan Rakonjac			
1969
The Battle of Neretva	Veljko Bulajić	Sergei Bondarchuk; Yul Brynner; Milena Dravić; Bata Živojinović; Ljubisa Samardzic; Boris Dvornik; Franco Nero	War film	Nominated for Academy Award for Best Foreign Language Film (1970)
Fräulein Doktor	Alberto Lattuada	Suzy Kendall, Kenneth More	War spy	Co-production with Italy
Handcuffs	Krsto Papić			
Most (The Bridge, Savage Bridge)	Hajrudin Krvavac	Bata Živojinović; Slobodan Perović; Boris Dvornik; Relja Bašić; Jovan Janićijević Burduš	War film	Popularized the Italian partisan ballad Bella ciao in many Communist countries.
Rani radovi	Želimir Žilnik			Won the Golden Bear at Berlin
When You Hear the Bells	Antun Vrdoljak			Entered into the 6th Moscow International Film Festival
Zaseda	Živojin Pavlović			

== 1970s ==
Title	Director	Cast	Genre	Notes
1970
Kelly's Heroes	Brian G. Hutton	Clint Eastwood; Donald Sutherland	War film	co-production
One Song a Day Takes Mischief Away	Krešo Golik	Franjo Majetić		
Red Wheat	Živojin Pavlović			Entered into the 21st Berlin International Film Festival
He Who Sings Means No Harm	Krešimir Golik	Franjo Majetić; Mirjana Bohanec; Tomislav Žganec	Comedy drama	
1971
Black Seed	Kiril Cenevski			Entered into the 7th Moscow International Film Festival
W.R.: Mysteries of the Organism	Dušan Makavejev	Milena Dravić; Ivica Vidović; Jagoda Kaloper	Political satire Sex comedy	Interfilm Award/FIPRESCI Prize at Berlin Festival (1971)
The Role of My Family in the Revolution	Bahrudin Čengić			Entered into the 32nd Venice International Film Festival
1972
Score	Radley Metzger	Claire Wilbur	Drama/Comedy	one of the first films to explore bi-sexual relationships
Traces of a Black Haired Girl	Zdravko Randic			Entered into the 22nd Berlin International Film Festival
Valter brani Sarajevo	Hajrudin Krvavac			
1973
The Battle of Sutjeska	Stipe Delić			Entered into the 8th Moscow International Film Festival
Leptirica	Đorđe Kadijević	Mirjana Nikolić; Petar Božović; Slobodan Petrović	Horror	Television film
Bombaši	Predrag Golubović			
1974
A Performance of Hamlet in the Village of Mrdusa Donja	Krsto Papić			Entered into the 24th Berlin International Film Festival
SB zatvara krug	Miomir Stamenković			
Užička republika	Žika Mitrović			
Partizani	Stole Janković			
Crveni udar	Predrag Golubović			
1975
Backbone	Vlatko Gilic		Horror	Entered into the 1977 Cannes Film Festival
The Republic of Užice	Žika Mitrović			Entered into the 9th Moscow International Film Festival
Doktor Mladen	Midhat Mutapdžić			
1976
Čuvar plaže u zimskom periodu	Goran Paskaljević			Entered into the 26th Berlin International Film Festival
Idealist	Igor Pretnar			Entered into the 10th Moscow International Film Festival
Izbavitelj; The Rat Savior	Krsto Papić	Ivica Vidović	Horror/Science fiction	
Vlak u snijegu	Mate Relja	Slavko Štimac; Edo Peročević	Children's film	
The Widowhood of Karolina Zasler	Matjaž Klopčič			Entered into the 27th Berlin International Film Festival
Vrhovi Zelengore	Zdravko Velimirović			
1977
The Dog Who Loved Trains	Goran Paskaljević			Entered into the 28th Berlin International Film Festival
Foolish Years	Zoran Čalić	Dragomir Bojanić Gidra	Comedy/Romance	
Akcija stadion	Dušan Vukotić	Igor Galo	War drama	
1978
Bravo maestro	Rajko Grlić			Entered into the 1978 Cannes Film Festival
Destinies	Predrag Golubovic	Miroljub Leso, Mirceta Vujicic	Drama	
Moment	Stole Janković			Entered into the 11th Moscow International Film Festival
Occupation in 26 Pictures	Lordan Zafranović			Entered into the 1979 Cannes Film Festival
Paviljon VI	Lucian Pintilie			Entered into the 1979 Cannes Film Festival
Nije nego	Milivoje Mića Milošević			
Dvoboj za južnu prugu	Zdravko Velimirović			
Boško Buha	Branko Bauer			
1979
Partizanska eskadrila	Hajrudin Krvavac			
Osvajanje slobode	Zdravko Šotra			

== 1980s ==
Title	Director	Cast	Genre	Notes
1980
Ko to tamo peva	Slobodan Šijan	Pavle Vujisić; Dragan Nikolić; Bata Stojković; Boro Stjepanović	Comedy drama	Won Special Jury Award at Montréal World Film Festival (1981) Voted as Best Yugoslav Movie of 1947–95 Period by members of the Yugoslavian Board of the Academy of Film Art and Science (AFUN) (1996). Screened at the 1981 Cannes Film Festival
Special Treatment	Goran Paskaljević			Entered into the 1980 Cannes Film Festival
Days of Dreams	Vlatko Gilic			Entered into the 1980 Cannes Film Festival
See You in the Next War	Živojin Pavlović			Screened at the 1982 Cannes Film Festival
Tajna Nikole Tesle	Krsto Papić			
1981
Do You Remember Dolly Bell?	Emir Kusturica	Slavko Štimac; Slobodan Aligrudić; Ljiljana Blagojević; Mira Banjac	Drama	Won Critics Award São Paulo International Film Festival (1982); Won Golden Lion for Best First Film (Emir Kusturica) Venice International Film Festival (1981)
Ritam zločina	Zoran Tadić	Ivica Vidović; Fabijan Šovagović	Drama	Won International Fantasy Film Award for "Best Actor" (Fabijan Šovagović) at the Fantasporto festival and "Best Screenplay"
Gosti iz galaksije Visitors from the Galaxy	Dušan Vukotić	Ljubisa Samardzic	Comedy/Science fiction	
Variola Vera	Goran Markovic	Rade Serbedzija	Horror	
The Melody Haunts My Memory	Rajko Grlić			Screened at the 1981 Cannes Film Festival
Peacetime in Paris	Predrag Golubović			Entered into the 12th Moscow International Film Festival
Visoki napon	Veljko Bulajić			
Berlin kaputt	Milivoje Mića Milošević			
1982
The Marathon Family	Slobodan Šijan	Bogdan Diklić; Danilo Stojković; Pavle Vujisić; Mija Aleksić	Comedy	Won Jury Prize at Montréal World Film Festival (1982)"Best Actress" award (Jelisaveta Sablić) at Pula Film Festival (1982)
The Smell of Quinces	Mirza Idrizović			Entered into the 13th Moscow International Film Festival
Variola vera	Goran Marković			
Nešto između	Srđan Karanović			
1983
Balkan Express	Branko Baletić	Dragan Nikolić; Bora Todorović; Tanja Bošković; Bata Živojinović; Toma Zdravković	Comedy	
High Road to China	Brian G. Hutton	Tom Selleck	Adventure/Comedy	
Le Prix du Danger	Yves Boisset	Alexander D'Arcy	Science fiction	
Nesto izmedju	Srdjan Karanovic			Screened at the 1983 Cannes Film Festival
Igmanski marš	Zdravko Šotra			
The Falcon	Vatroslav Mimica			
1984
Balkanski špijun	Dušan Kovačević, Božidar Nikolić	Danilo Stojković; Bora Todorović	Comedy	Won Golden Arena award at Pula Film Festival (1984)"Best Actor" (Danilo Stojković as Ilija Čvorović) at Pula Film Festival (1984)
Davitelj protiv davitelja Strangler vs. Strangler	Slobodan Sijan	Taško Načić	Comedy/Horror	
Dediscina	Matjaž Klopčič			Screened at the 1985 Cannes Film Festival
Nema problema	Mića Milošević	Lepa Brena	Music film	
Unseen Wonder	Živko Nikolić			Entered into the 14th Moscow International Film Festival
U raljama života	Rajko Grlić			
1985
When Father Was Away on Business	Emir Kusturica	Miki Manojlović; Mirjana Karanović; Mustafa Nadarević	Drama	Won Palme d'Or (Golden Palm) at Cannes Film Festival (1985)Nominated for Academy Award for Best Foreign Language Film (1985)FIPRESCI Prize Cannes Film Festival (1985)
Transylvania 6-5000	Rudy De Luca	Jeff Goldblum	Comedy/Horror	
1986
Armour of God	Jackie Chan	Jackie Chan	Action/Adventure	
Lijepe zene prolaze kroz grad	Želimir Žilnik	Ljuba Tadić	Science fiction	
1987
Aenigma	Lucio Fulci	Jared Martin; Lara Lamberti; Ulli Reinthaler	Horror/Thriller	
Escape from Sobibor	Jack Gold	Alan Arkin	Drama/War	
Već viđeno Reflections	Goran Markovic	Anica Dobra	Horror	
The Harms Case	Slobodan D. Pesic			Screened at the 1988 Cannes Film Festival
Oktoberfest	Dragan Kresoja			Entered into the 15th Moscow International Film Festival
Dogodilo se na današnji dan	Miroslav Lekić			
1988
Time of the Gypsies	Emir Kusturica	Davor Dujmović; Bora Todorović; Ljubica Adzovic	Drama	Won Best Director at Cannes Film Festival (1989) *Nominated for Palme d'Or (Golden Palm) at Cannes Film Festival (1989) Won Best Foreign Film at the Guldbagge Awards in Sweden (1991)Nominated for Best Foreign Film at César Awards in France (1990)
The Way Steel Was Tempered	Želimir Žilnik			Entered into the 16th Moscow International Film Festival
Haloa - praznik kurvi	Lordan Zafranović			
1989
ALΩA-Praznik kurvi	Lordan Zafranović	Stevo Žigon; Neda Arnerić; Ranko Zidarić; Dušica Žegarac	Erotic-drama	"Best Actress" award (Neda Arnerić) at Pula Film Festival (1989)
That Summer of White Roses	Rajko Grlić	Tom Conti, Rod Steiger, Susan George	Drama	

== 1990s ==
Year	Title	Director
1990	Captain America	Albert Pyun
1990	Gluvi barut	Bahrudin Čengić
1990	Umetni raj	Karpo Ačimović Godina
1991	Svemirci su krivi za sve	Zoran Čalić
1991	Original falsifikata	Dragan Kresoja
1992	Tito and Me	Goran Marković
1993	Three Tickets to Hollywood	Božidar Nikolić
1994	Ni na nebu ni na zemlji	Miloš Radivojević
1995	Underground	Emir Kusturica
1996	Pretty Village, Pretty Flame	Srđan Dragojević
1997	Rage	Slobodan Skerlić
1998	Black Cat, White Cat	Emir Kusturica
1999	The Dagger	Miroslav Lekic

== 2000s ==
Year	Title	Director
2000	Sky Hook	Ljubiša Samardžić
2001	Absolute 100	Srdan Golubović
2002	Zona Zamfirova	Zdravko Šotra
2003	Strawberries in the Supermarket	Dušan Milić

== See also ==
- List of Yugoslav submissions for the Academy Award for Best International Feature Film
- List of films from Serbia and Montenegro
- List of Bosnia and Herzegovina films
- List of Croatian films
- List of Kosovan films
- List of Montenegrin films
- List of films from North Macedonia
- List of Serbian films
- List of Slovenian films
