= List of Croatian actors =

The following is a list of Croatian film, television and theatre actors, listed in alphabetical order.

== A ==
- Dejan Aćimović (b. 1963)
- Božidar Alić (1954–2020)

== B ==
- Lana Barić (b. 1979)
- Relja Bašić (1930–2017)
- Ena Begović (1960–2000)
- Mia Begović (b. 1963)
- Rene Bitorajac (b. 1972)
- Goran Bogdan (b. 1980)
- Slavko Brankov (1951–2006)
- Amar Bukvić (b. 1981)
- Boris Buzančić (1929–2014)

== C ==
- Zlatko Crnković (1936–2012)
- Petar Cvirn (b. 1986)
- Zrinka Cvitešić (b. 1979)

== D ==
- Dragan Despot (b. 1956)
- Franjo Dijak (b. 1977)
- Nataša Dorčić (b. 1968)
- Vanja Drach (1932–2009)
- Vlatko Dulić (1943–2015)
- Boris Dvornik (1939–2008)

== Đ ==
- Jadranka Đokić (b. 1981)

== E ==
- Nela Eržišnik (1922–2007)

== F ==
- Tarik Filipović (b. 1972)
- Božidarka Frajt (b. 1940)
- Mira Furlan (1955–2021)

== G ==
- Nada Gačešić-Livaković (b. 1951)
- Stanka Gjurić (b. 1956)
- Emil Glad (1929–2009)
- Ratko Glavina (b. 1941)
- Ivo Gregurević (1952–2019)
- Goran Grgić (b. 1965)

== H ==
- Ivan Herceg (b. 1981)

== I ==
- Nives Ivanković (b. 1967)
- Ilija Ivezić (1926–2016)

== J ==
- Nataša Janjić (b. 1981)
- Zdenko Jelčić (b. 1946)
- Filip Juričić (b. 1981)
- Zvonimir Jurić (b. 1971)

== K ==
- Jagoda Kaloper (1947–2016)
- Ana Karić (1941–2014)
- Hrvoje Kečkeš (b. 1975)
- Ljubomir Kerekeš (b. 1960)
- Marija Kohn (1934–2018)
- Kristina Krepela (b. 1979)
- Robert Kurbaša (b. 1977)
- Pero Kvrgić (1927–2020)

== L ==
- Dolores Lambaša (1981–2013)
- Frano Lasić (b. 1954)
- Alen Liverić (b. 1967)
- Tonko Lonza (1930–2018)
- Leon Lučev (b. 1970)

== M ==
- Franjo Majetić (1923–1991)
- Stojan Matavulj (b. 1961)
- Rene Medvešek (b. 1963)
- Sven Medvešek (b. 1965)
- Milica Mihičić (1864–1950)

== N ==
- Mustafa Nadarević (1943–2020)
- Antun Nalis (1911–2000)
- Bojan Navojec (b. 1976)
- Goran Navojec (b. 1970)
- Suzana Nikolić (b. 1965)

== O ==
- Ecija Ojdanić (b. 1974)
- Mia Oremović (1918–2010)
- Božidar Orešković (1942–2010)

== P ==
- Olga Pakalović (b. 1978)
- Leona Paraminski (b. 1979)
- Stjepan Perić (b. 1983)
- Frane Perišin (b. 1960)
- Edo Peročević (1937–2007)
- Janko Popović Volarić (b. 1980)
- Žarko Potočnjak (1946–2021)
- Marinko Prga (b. 1971)
- Alma Prica (b. 1962)
- Matija Prskalo (b. 1966)

== R ==
- Zvonimir Rogoz (1887–1988)
- Vicko Ruić (b. 1959)

== S ==
- Martin Sagner (b. 1932–2019)
- Lucija Šerbedžija (b. 1973)
- Rade Šerbedžija (b. 1946)
- Ivo Serdar (1933–1985)
- Marija Škaričić (b. 1977)
- Slavko Sobin (b. 1984)
- Semka Sokolović-Bertok (1935–2008)
- Fabijan Šovagović (1932–2001)
- Filip Šovagović (b. 1966)
- Anja Šovagović (b. 1963)

== Š ==
- Antonija Šola (b. 1979)
- Tamara Šoletić (b. 1965)

== U ==
- Robert Ugrina (b. 1974)

== V ==
- Sanja Vejnović (b. 1961)
- Jelena Veljača (b. 1981)
- Ivica Vidović (1939–2011)
- Nina Violić (b. 1972)
- Goran Višnjić (b. 1972)
- Ornela Vištica (b. 1989)
- Zlatko Vitez (b. 1950)
- Antun Vrdoljak (b. 1931)
- Mladen Vulić (b. 1969)
- Predrag Vušović (1960–2011)

== Z ==
- Vera Zima (1953–2020)

== See also ==
- Lists of actors
