= Golden Arena for Best Supporting Actor =

- Awarded for: "Performance by an actor in a supporting role"
- Country: Yugoslavia (1955–1990); Croatia (1992–present)
- Presented by: Pula Film Festival Jury
- First award: 1955
- Currently held by: Leon Lučev (2020)
- Website: Official Website

The Golden Arena for Best Supporting Actor is an annual award, given by the Pula-based cinema circle at the Pula Film Festival, to honour the actors who gave outstanding performances in a supporting role. The Golden Arena is considered the Balkan equivalent of the Academy Award.

== As Yugoslav Film Awards ==
Year	Winner	Film
1955	Stane Potokar	Trenutki odločitve
1956	Rade Marković, Jozo Laurenčić	Šolaja, Veliki i mali
1957	Rade Marković (2), Mihajlo Viktorović	pod nazivom: druga i treća nagrada za mušku ulogu
1958	Antun Vrdoljak, Milan Srdoč, Milorad Majić	H8, Četiri kilometra na sat
1959	Milan Milošević	Vlak bez voznog reda
1960	Branko Tatić	Deveti krug, Tri Ane
1961	not awarded	
1962	Bata Živojinović, Ljubiša Samardžić	For Drama Achievement
1963	Rade Marković (3) (Srebrna arena)	Radopolje
1964	Vojo Mirić (Srebrna arena)	Službeni položaj
1965	Janez Vrhovec (Srebrna arena)	Čovek nije tica
1966	Bekim Fehmiu (Srebrna arena)	Vreme ljubavi, Roj
1967	Bekim Fehmiu (2) (Srebrna arena)	Skupljači perja, Protest
1968	Branko Pleša (Srebrna arena)	Pre istine
1969	Danilo Stojković (Srebrna arena)	Zazidani
1970	Adam Čejvan (Srebrna arena)	Lisice
1971	Boris Dvornik (Srebrna arena)	U gori raste zelen bor, Opklada
1972	Vladimir Popović (Srebrna arena)	Živjeti za inat
1973	Ivica Vidović (Srebrna arena)	Kužiš stari moj
1974	Boris Buzančić (Srebrna arena), Abdurrahman Shala (epizodna uloga)	Užička republika, Derviš i smrt
1975	Nikola Simić (Srebrna arena), Ljubiša Samardžić (2)(epizodna uloga)	Hitler iz našeg sokaka, Crvena zemlja Doktor Mladen
1976	Miodrag Radovanović (Srebrna arena), Veljko Mandić (epizodna uloga)	Salaš u malom ritu, Vrhovi zelengore
1977	Zvonko Lepetić (Srebrna arena), Ljubiša Samardžić (3) (epizodna uloga)	Ludi dani, Specijalno vaspitanje
1978	Zoran Radmilović (Srebrna arena), Stevan Gardinovački (epizodna uloga)	Paviljon VI, Stići pre svitanja
1979	Abdurrahman Shala (2) (Srebrna arena)	Era e lisi
1980	Aleksandar Berček	Ko to tamo peva
1981	not awarded	
1982	Milan Štrljić	Savamala
1983	Zijah Sokolović	Zadah tela
1984	Fabijan Šovagović	Ambasador
1985	Božidar Bunjevac	Ovni in mamuti
1986	Duško Kustovski	Srećna nova '49
1987	Petar Božović	Već viđeno
1988	Ljubiša Samardžić (4)	Kuća pored pruge
1989	Fabijan Šovagović (2)	Čovjek koji je volio sprovode
1990	Zaim Muzeferija	Stanica običnih vozova

=== As Croatian Film Awards ===
Year	Winner	Original title
1991	festival canceled	
1992	Damir Lončar	Luka
1999	not awarded	
1994	not awarded	
1995	Mustafa Nadarević	Isprani
1996	Josip Genda	Sedma kronika
1997	Drago Krča	Božić u Beču
1998	Ivo Gregurević	Tri muškarca Melite Žganjer
1999	Ante Vican	Crvena prašina
2000	Dejan Aćimović	Je li jasno, prijatelju?
2001	not awarded	
2002	Ivica Vidović (2)	Fine mrtve djevojke
2003	Danko Ljuština	Konjanik
2004	Vili Matula	Sto minuta Slave
2005	Dragan Despot	Pušča bistra
2006	Emir Hadžihafizbegović	Karaula
2007	Borko Perić	Živi i mrtvi
2008	Leon Lučev	Nije kraj
2009	Nikša Butijer	Crnci
2010	Bogdan Diklić	Sedamdeset i dva dana
2011	Boris Buzančić (2)	Kotlovina
2012	Mate Gulin	Pismo Ćaći
2013	Nikša Butijer (2)	Svećenikova djeca
2014	Igor Kovač	Kosac
2015	Dado Ćosić	Zvizdan
2016	Goran Navojec	Sve najbolje
2017	Dejan Aćimović (2)	Ustav Republike Hrvatske
2018	Borko Perić (2)	Osmi povjerenik
2019	Borko Perić (3)	General
2020	Leon Lučev (2)	Fishing and Fisherman's Conversations

=== Performers with multiple awards - supporting roles ===
Awards	Actor	Years
4	Ljubiša Samardžić	**1962**, **1975**, **1977**, **1988**
3	Rade Marković	**1956**, **1957**, **1963**
3	Borko Perić	2007, 2018, 2019
2	Bekim Fehmiu	**1966**, **1967**
2	Abdurrahman Shala	**1974**, **1979**
2	Fabijan Šovagović	**1984**, **1989**
2	Ivica Vidović	**1973**, 2002
2	Boris Buzančić	**1974**, 2011
2	Nikša Butijer	2009, 2013
2	Dejan Aćimović	2000, 2017
2	Leon Lučev	2008, 2020

=== Performers with multiple awards - both supporting and lead roles ===
Awards	Actor	Years
7	Ljubiša Samardžić	1962, **1973**, 1975, 1977, **1980**, **1982**, 1988
5	Ivo Gregurević	1998, **1999**, **2002**, **2005**, **2014**
4	Ljuba Tadić	**1956**, **1964**, **1968**, **1975**
4	Bata Živojinović	1962, **1965**, **1967**, **1972**
3	Filip Šovagović	**1995**, **1998**, **2001**
3	Rade Šerbedžija	**1978**, **1986**, **2010**
3	Boris Dvornik	**1969**, 1971, **1979**
3	Rade Marković	1956, 1957, 1963
3	Borko Perić	2007, 2018, 2019
2	Pavle Vuisić	**1958**, **1977**
2	Miki Manojlović	**1983**, **1985**
2	Ilija Ivezić	**1993**, **2000**
2	Rene Bitorajac	**2009**, **2012**
2	Antun Vrdoljak	1958, **1960**
2	Mustafa Nadarević	**1988**, 1995
2	Emir Hadžihafizbegović	2006, **2007**
2	Bogdan Diklić	2010, **2013**
2	Bekim Fehmiu	1966, 1967
2	Abdurrahman Shala	1974, 1979
2	Fabijan Šovagović	1984, 1989
2	Ivica Vidović	1973, 2002
2	Boris Buzančić	1974, 2011
2	Nikša Butijer	2009, 2013
2	Dejan Aćimović	2000, 2017

- Years in **bold** insight Best Actor winner
