= Edo Peročević =

Croatian actor (1937–2007)

Eduard "Edo" Peročević (3 December 1937 in Sarajevo – 28 April 2007 in Zagreb) was a Croatian actor, best known for the role of the ticket collector in the 1976 children's film Vlak u snijegu.

Peročević was also known for his distinct voice, which helped him establish a successful career as a radio announcer.

== Filmography ==
Year	Title	Role	Notes
1969	An Event	Kockar	
1969	Accidental Life	Kondukter	
1969	Love and Some Swear Words	Luka, kraljevski oficir	
1970	Ann and Eve	Farmer	
1970	Handcuffs	Baletic	
1971	The Pine Tree in the Mountain	Ustasa	
1971	Makedonskiot del od pekolot	Dime Pavtar	
1972	Vuk samotnjak	Rankov otac Nikola	
1973	To Live on Love	Nastavnik tjelesnog	
1975	The House	Vlado	
1975	Anno Domini 1573	Tahijev vojnik	
1976	Train in the Snow	Kondukter Eduard 'Saperlot' Perocevic	
1976	The Rat Savior	Policajac	
1977	Operation Stadium	Ilegalac / Profesor	
1978	The Last Mission of Demolitions Man Cloud	Znidarcic	
1979	The Man to Destroy	Djakon	
1979	Godisnja doba Zeljke, Visnje i Branke	Socijalni radnik	(segment "Visnja")
1980	The Secret of Nikola Tesla	Kolman Czito	
1981	You Love Only Once		
1981	Visitors from the Galaxy	Redactor	
1981	The Falcon	Turcin - clan Alijine bande	
1981	Snadji se, druze	Komesar cete Rukljac	
1982	I Want to Live	Veterinar	
1984	Zadarski memento	Ribar koji rasteze mrezu	
1984	The Secret of an Old Attic	Inspektor	
1985	Horvat's Choice	Jakob Lukac	
1986	The Promised Land	Jakov, kolonist	
1988	My Uncle's Legacy	Jure, protjerani direktor skole	
1989	Donator	Seljak s konjem	
1991	Story from Croatia		
1991	The Time of Warriors	Ribocuvar	
1993	Vrijeme za...	Ilija	
1994	The Price of Life	Tuco	
1998	Kanjon opasnih igara	Speleolog	
1999	Marshal Tito's Spirit	Jure	
