= Hermina Pipinić =

Croatian actress (1928–2020)

- Born: 1 May 1928; Zagreb, Kingdom of Serbs, Croats and Slovenes
- Died: 19 December 2020 (aged 92); Zagreb, Croatia
- Occupation: Actress
- Years active: 1948–1997

Hermina Pipinić (1 May 1928 – 19 December 2020) was a Croatian actress. She attended an acting school in Zagreb and debuted on stage in 1948 at the First Drama Theatre in Zagreb.

== Filmography ==
=== Film roles ===
- Millions on the Island (1955) as Ivica's sister
- The Road a Year Long (1958) as Agneza
- Hvezda jede na jig (1958)
- Vjetar je stao pred zoru (1959) as Andja
- Piko (1959) as Mom
- Point 905 (1960) as Jelka
- The Fourteenth Day (1961) as Marija
- Square of Violence (1961)
- Ne diraj u srecu (1961)
- Karolina Riječka (1961) as Marija
- Prozvan je i V-3 (1962) as Čvrga's Mother
- The Steppe (1962) as Olga Ivanovna
- Sjenka slave (1962) as Pripita i razocarana zena
- Opasni put (1963) as Božena
- Double Circle (1963) as Maria
- Ljudi i neljudi (1963, TV Movie)
- Kandidat smrti (1963, TV Movie)
- Jedna od onih godina (1963, TV Movie)
- Usluga tačna i solidna (1964, TV Movie)
- Doktorova noć (1964, TV Movie)
- Back of the Medal (1965) as Lover
- Old Surehand (1965) as Molly
- Glasam za ljubav (1965)
- The Seventh Continent (1966) as Boy's Mother
- Kineski zid (1967, TV Movie)
- The Birch Tree (1967) as Jaga
- Protest (1967) as Molnar's Wife
- Pošalji čovjeka u pola dva (1967) as Rita Batić
- Zrno do zrna (1968, Short)
- Rastrgani (1968, TV Movie)
- Dobro jutro, gospodine Karlek (1970, TV Movie)
- Jana (1970, TV Movie) as Jana
- Kainov znak (1970, TV Movie)
- Mora (1971)
- Teret dokaza (1972, TV Movie)
- Mala majka (1973)
- To Live on Love (1973) as Nastavnica
- Kronika jednog zločina (1973)
- Passion According to Matthew (1975) as Rahela
- Attempted Flight (1976) as Ivo's Mother
- A Shot (1977) as Grgec's Wife
- Crazy Days (1977) as Janja
- Operation Stadium (1977) as Mrs. Mraović
- Ćutanje profesora Martića (1978, TV Movie)
- Usvojenje (1978, Short)
- Karmine (1978, TV Movie)
- God (1980, TV Movie)
- Obiteljski album (1981, TV Movie) as Mother
- Visitors from the Arkana Galaxy (1981) as Stela's Mother
- Evening Bells (1986) as Meira's Mother
- Terevenka (1987, TV Movie)
- Kad ftičeki popevleju (1988, TV Movie)
- Bloodsuckers (1989) as Tamara Baumfeld

=== Television roles ===
- Maratonci (1968)
- La kermesse des brigands (1969) as Faustina Fetrenelli
- Gruntovčani (1975) as Špranja
- Kapelski kresovi (1975-1976) as Ivanka
- Nikola Tesla (1977) as Gazdarica
- Smogovci (1982-1997) as Melita Vragec (final appearance)
