= Fahro Konjhodžić =

Fahrudin Konjhodžić
- Born: 13 January 1931; Sarajevo, Kingdom of Yugoslavia
- Died: 26 May 1984 (aged 53); Zagreb, SFR Yugoslavia
- Years active: 1954–84

Fahrudin "Fahro" Konjhodžić (13 January 1931 – 26 May 1984) was a Bosnian film and television actor.

== Death ==
Konjhodžić died in 1984 after a long illness, aged 53.

== Partial filmography ==
- Stojan Mutikaša (1954) - Jegulja
- Jedini izlaz (1958) - Tomo
- Martin in the Clouds (1961) - Hrvoje
- The Emperor's New Clothes (1961) - Pisar
- Velika turneja (1961) - Kurir
- Šeki snima, pazi se (1962) - Reditelj
- The Steppe (1962) - Konstantin
- Macak pod sljemom (1962) - Briga
- Monday or Tuesday (1966) - Vodja pogrebnog orkestra
- Illusion (1967) - Klarinetist u orkestru
- An Event (1969) - Skelar Blaz
- Love and Some Swear Words (1969) - Joko, mjesna luda
- Passing Days (1970) - Movie maker assistent
- Handcuffs (1970) - Cazim
- The Master and Margaret (1972) - Lavrovic
- The Bloody Vultures of Alaska (1973)
- Polenov prah (1974)
- Anno Domini 1573 (1975) - Maroder (pljackas poginulih vojnika)
- The Rat Savior (1976) - Violinist
- Occupation in 26 Pictures (1978) - Rudlavi Talijan s bradicom
- Meetings with Remarkable Men (1979) - Soloviev
- Gazija (1981) - Kockar
- The Marathon Family (1982) - Gospodin Rajkovic
- Memed, My Hawk (1984) - (final film role)
