= The Deer Hunt =

- Directed by: Fadil Hadžić
- Written by: Fadil Hadžić
- Starring: Boris Dvornik; Silvana Armenulić; Ivo Serdar; Miha Baloh
- Edited by: Radojka Tanhofer
- Music by: Nikica Kalogjera
- Production company: Film Authors' Studio
- Release date: 10 January 1972
- Running time: 97 minutes
- Country: Yugoslavia
- Language: Serbo-Croatian

The Deer Hunt (Lov na jelene) is a Yugoslav film directed by Fadil Hadžić. It was released in 1972.

== Cast ==
- Boris Dvornik - Konobar Zeljo
- Silvana Armenulić - Pjevacica Seka
- Ivo Serdar - Recepcionar
- Aleksander Krošl (as Sandi Krošl) - Ivan Susnjar
- Miha Baloh - Nacelnik milicije
- Franjo Majetić - Brico
- Mate Ergović - Joza Vikulic
- Fabijan Šovagović - Zdravko
- Sanda Langerholz - Susnjareva sestra
- Zvonko Lepetić - Isljednik Andrija
- Adem Čejvan - Kosta
- Relja Bašić - Advokat Janjic
- Ilija Ivezić - Provokator
- Tonko Lonza - Doktor
- Ljubo Kapor - Uhapsenik
- Ivo Fici
- Franjo Fruk - Zeljeznicar
- Mirko Svec - Cinovnik u banci
- Vinko Lisjak - Gospon Maresic
- Marija Aleksić - Sankerica Marica
- Velimir Keković - Milicajac
- Marija Geml - Nacelnikova tajnica
- Jagoda Kralj - Vikuliceva kcer
- Dane Georgijevski
- Tomislav Lipljin - Gost u restoranu
- Dobrila Biser - Recepcionareva zenska
- Ante Kraljević
- Ljudevit Gerovac - Stranka kod brijaca
- Ivan Lovriček
- Zvonko Zungul
- Lena Politeo - Stranka kod odvjetnika
