= Zlatko Madunić =

Croatian actor

- Born: 14 May 1930; Slavonski Brod, Yugoslavia
- Died: 14 May 1995 (aged 65); Zagreb, Croatia
- Occupation: Actor
- Years active: 1956-1990

Zlatko Madunić (14 May 1930 – 14 May 1995) was a Croatian actor. He appeared in more than seventy films from 1956 to 1990.

== Filmography ==
Year	Title	Role	Notes
1956	Don't Look Back, My Son	Agent	
1956	U mrezi	Spijun	
1958	Jedini izlaz	Kratki	
1960	Point 905	Narednik	
1960	The Ninth Circle	Ustasa	
1960	Drug predsednik centarfor	Radojica ... golman	
1960	Atomic War Bride		
1960	Bolje je umeti		
1960	The Fourteenth Day	Kondukter	
1961	The Emperor's New Clothes	Nag	
1961	Sudar na paralelama	Kondukter	
1961	Ne diraj u srecu		
1961	Potraga za zmajem	Mile	
1962	Srescemo se veceras		
1962	Minuta za umor		
1962	Macak pod sljemom	Franjo Smokvica	
1962	Nas avto	Hairdresser	
1963	Opasni put	Otto	
1963	U sukobu	Jazvic	
1964	Vrtlog	Ljuban	(segment "Vrtlog")
1966	Glineni golub	Agent	
1967	Playing Soldiers	Njemacki zarobljenik	
1968	Gravitation	Sluzbenik u banci	
1968	Bekstva	Ravnatelj Karlovic	
1968	Goli čovik		
1969	Nizvodno od sunca	Sumar	
1970	The Fifth Day of Peace	Moller	Uncredited
1970	Handcuffs		
1970	The Way to Paradise	Djelatnik poslanstva	
1972	Walter Defends Sarajevo	Policijski agent	
1972	The Master and Margaret	Oskar Danilovic	
1973	Razmeđa	Kamiondzija	
1974	Captain Mikula, the Kid	Prevoditelj	
1977	Operation Stadium	Povjerenik ustaskog redarstva	
1980	The Woman from Sarajevo		
1981	The Falcon	Georgios - dvorjanin	
1982	Ucna leta izumitelja Polza	Trainer	
1984	The Small Train Robbery	Sreski nacelnik	
1985	Jenseits der Morgenröte	Pascha	Episode: "Adler der Steppe"
