= Milka Podrug-Kokotović =

Croatian actress (1930–2025)

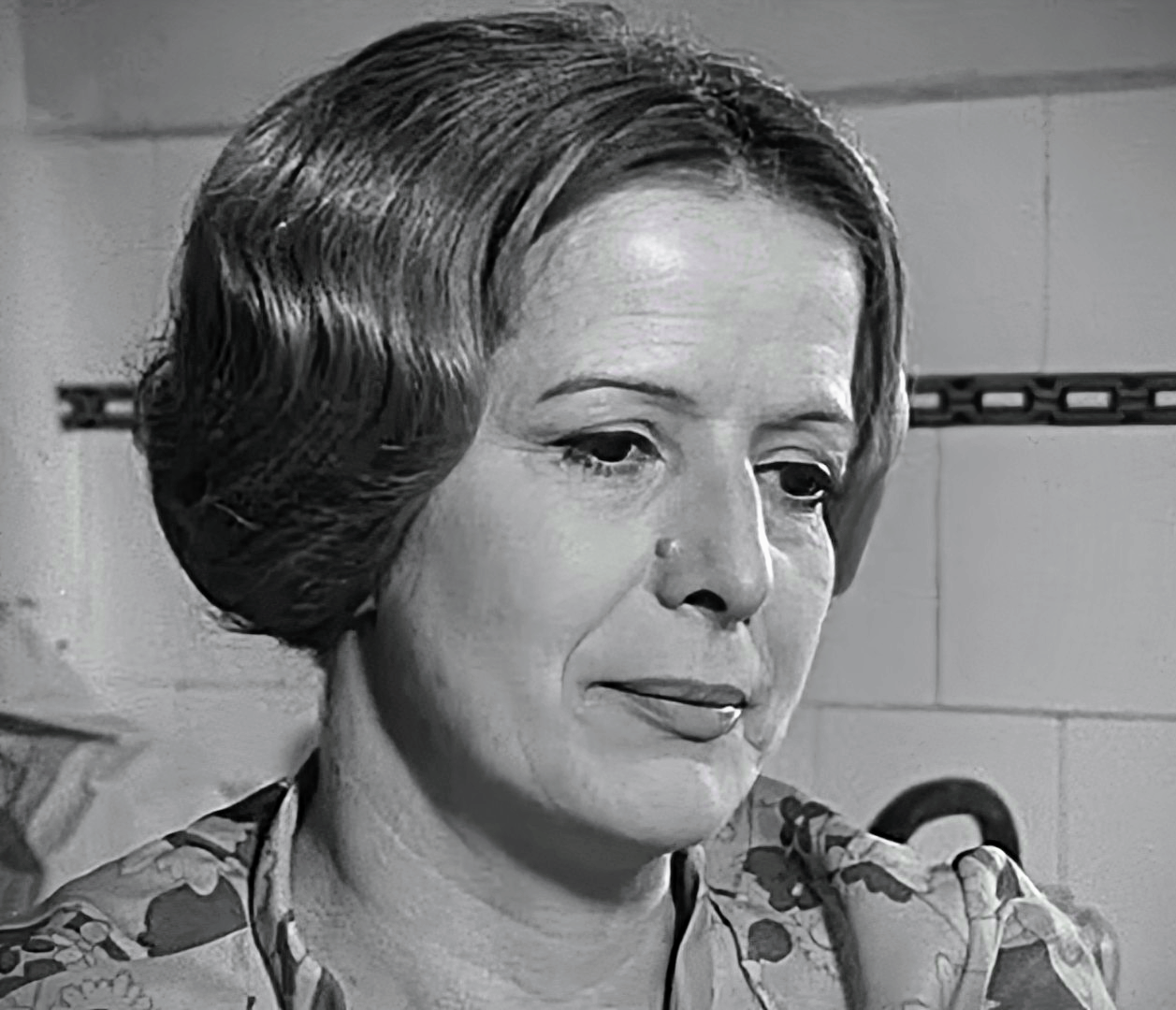
- Born: Milka Podrug; 19 September 1930; Dicmo, Kingdom of Yugoslavia
- Died: 7 June 2025 (aged 94); Split, Croatia
- Occupation: Actress
- Years active: 1954–2025
- Spouse: Miloš 'Miše' Kokotović
- Awards: Vladimir Nazor Award

Milka Podrug‑Kokotović (19 September 1930 – 7 June 2025) was a Croatian actress in theatre, film and television. A long-standing lead at the Dubrovnik Marin Držić Theatre, she performed in over 150 roles and became one of the most beloved figures of Croatian dramatic arts.

== Early life ==
Born in Dicmo on 19 September 1930, she spent her childhood and youth in Split. She completed classical gymnasium in Split before enrolling in acting school in Zagreb. Awarded a scholarship, she continued her studies in Sarajevo and graduated from the state acting academy in 1953.

== Career ==
Podrug-Kokotović debuted in 1952 at the National Theatre in Sarajevo. After a season in Šibenik, she joined the Dubrovnik-based Marina Držić Theatre in 1954 and remained there for her entire stage career. A fixture at the Dubrovnik Summer Festival from 1964 onward, acclaimed for her interpretations of Brecht, Krleža, Dürrenmatt, I. Vojnović, and M. Držić. Notable roles include Jele in Ekvinocijo (1971) and Marija in Tužna Jele (1994).

Podrug-Kokotović appeared in films such as Mirisi, zlato i tamjan (1971), Mećava (1977), Karneval, anđeo i prah (1990), and Ljeto za sjećanje (1990). Her television appearances include Naše malo misto, Poglavlja iz života Augusta Šenoe, Tuđinac, Zagrljaj, and others.

== Personal life and death ==
Podrug-Kokotović was married for a long time to Miloš "Miše" Kokotović, after a very short marriage to actor Božidar Smiljanić. Kokotović stayed out of the limelight, working in administration. He was a one-time manager of the Dubrovnik radio station. He died in 2015. She died on 7 June 2025, aged 94.

== Awards and honours ==
Podrug-Kokotović was honored with many awards like Vladimir Nazor Award, City of Dubrovnik Award, Golden Laurel Wreath, Grand Prix Orlando, Croatian Drama Award etc.

== Filmography ==
- Mirisi, zlato i tamjan (1971)
- Mećava (1977)
- Karneval, anđeo i prah (1990)
- Ljeto za sjećanje (1990)
