= The Golden Years (1994 film) =

- Directed by: Davor Žmegač
- Written by: Davor Žmegač
- Produced by: Denys Fleutot; Damir Teresak
- Starring: Igor Galo; Goran Grgić; Aleksandra Turjak; Mirta Zečević; Ilija Ivezić
- Cinematography: Slobodan Trninić
- Edited by: Bernarda Fruk
- Music by: Zlatan Stipišić Gibonni; Zrinko Tutić
- Release date: 15 October 1994 (International Filmfestival Mannheim-Heidelberg)
- Running time: 118 minutes
- Countries: Croatia, France
- Languages: Croatian, Serbian

The Golden Years (Zlatne godine) is a Croatian drama film written and directed by Davor Žmegač. It was released in 1994.

== Cast ==
- Igor Galo as Jakov Petras
- Goran Grgić as Mislav Petras
- Aleksandra Turjak as Sunčana Križić
- Mirta Zečević as Tala
- Ilija Ivezić as Brkan
- Dejan Aćimović as Stipe Bubalo
- Inge Appelt as Sunčana's Aunt
- Mirko Boman as Cop No. 2
- Slavko Brankov as Prisoner
- Vanja Drach as Relja
- Ksenija Pajić as Marija Petras
- Marija Kohn as Sunčana's Mother
