= The Doctor of Craziness =

2003 film

Doktor ludosti
- Directed by: Fadil Hadzic
- Written by: Fadil Hadzic
- Produced by: Jozo Patljak
- Starring: Igor Mesin
- Cinematography: Slobodan Trninic
- Edited by: Dubravko Slunjski
- Release date: 2003
- Country: Croatia
- Language: Croatian

Doktor ludosti is a Croatian comedy film directed by Fadil Hadzic. It was released in 2003.

== Cast ==
- Igor Mešin - Novinar Horkic mladji
- Pero Kvrgić - Dr. Emil Hofbauer
- Damir Lončar - Poslovni covjek
- Elizabeta Kukić - Svadljiva gospodja
- Žarko Potočnjak - Ignjac Dobrohotic
- Milan Strljic - Reporter Horkic stariji
- Zoran Pokupec - Oto Puba Zbunjakovic
- Predrag Vušović - General (as Predrag Vusovic)
- Olga Pakalović - Zbunjakoviceva kci
- Dražen Kuhn - Obavjestajac Igor Kulenko
- Boris Dvornik - Prolaznik
- Ivan Lovriček - Prolaznik
- Ivan Zadro - Nasmijani covjek (as Ivica Zadro)
- Jadranka Matković - Radikalka
- Mladen Domas - Adjutant
- Inge Apelt - Cistacica
