= Frano Lasić =

Croatian actor and singer

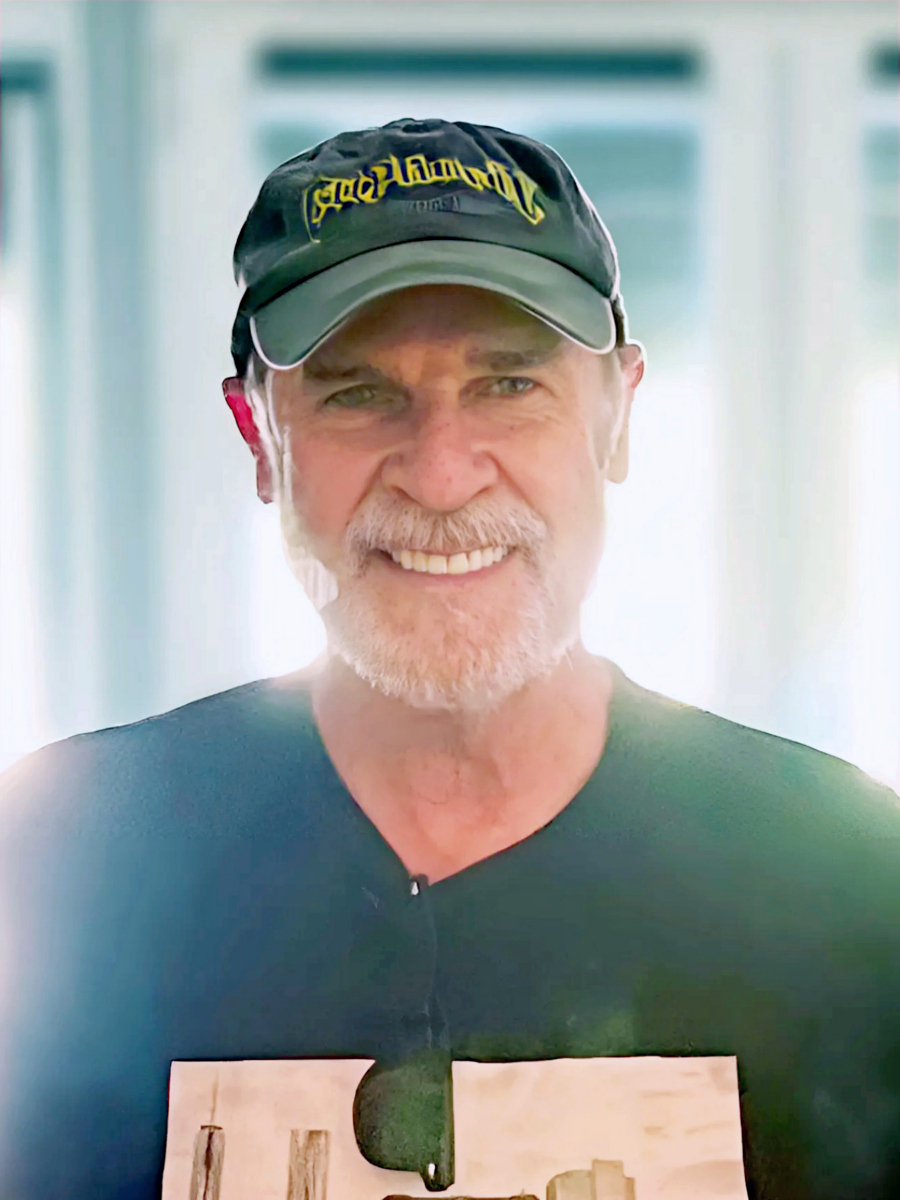
- Frano Lasić (Beograd, 2024)
- Born: 12 November 1954 (age 71); Rijeka, PR Croatia, Yugoslavia
- Occupations: Actor singer
- Years active: 1978–present

Frano Lasić (born 12 November 1954) is a Croatian actor and pop singer.

== Filmography ==
=== Television roles ===
- "Jack Holborn" (1982)
- "The Winds of War" (1983)
- "Kiklop" as Melkior Tresić (1983)
- "The Fortunate Pilgrim" as Dr. Eschen (1988)
- "Dirty Dozen: The Series" as Steinmetz (1988)
- "Obiteljska stvar" as Goran Nadalli (1998)
- "Lisice" as gynecologist (2003)
- "Crna hronika" as Jeff (2004)
- "Villa Maria" as Dr. Andrija Posavec (2004–2005)
- "Obični ljudi" as Nikola Lončarić (2007)
- "Zabranjena ljubav" as Marinko Ružić (2006–2008)
- "Bitange i princeze" as coronel (2009)
- "Ples sa zvijezdama" as Frano Lasić (2009)
- "Dolina sunca" as Toni Herceg (2010)
- "Ruža vjetrova" as Milivoj Matošić (2011–2012)
- "Zvezdara" as ministar Jojić (2013)
- "Jedne letnje noći" as Ivo (2015)
- "Budva na pjenu od mora" as grof Graziano (2015)
- "Selo gori a baba se češlja" as Frano (2016)
- "Don't Bet on the Brits" as Dimitrije (2018)
- "Miss Scarlet and the Duke" (2020.)
- "Alexander of Yugoslavia" as David Lloyd George (2021)
- "Dnevnik velikog Perice" as Kustos (2021)
- "Beležnica profesora Miškovića" as Vagner (2021)
- "Ubice mog oca" as attorney Žegarac (2022)
- "San snova" as Rudolf Herman (2023)
- "Pelagijin venac" as Arsenije Atanasijevic (2025)
- "Vreme smrti" as De Grej (2025)

=== Movie roles ===
- "Okupacija u 26 slika" as Niko (1978)
- "Švabica" (1980)
- "Splav meduze" as Aleksa Ristić (1980)
- "Pad Italije" as Niko (1981)
- "Kiklop" as Melkior Tresić (1982)
- "Nastojanje" (1982)
- "Servantes iz Malog mista" (1982)
- "U logoru" as Šimunić (1983)
- "Groznica ljubavi" as Oto Müeller (1984)
- "The Aviator" as Daniel Hansen (1985)
- "The Magic Snowman" as Ned (1987)
- "Slučaj Harms" as Danil Harms (1994)
- "Fatal Sky" as Bergen (1990)
- "Noćna straža" (1995)
- "Kanjon opasnih igara" as Horst Keller (1998)
- "Dubrovački suton" (1999)
- "Fade to Black" as Dellere (2006)
- "Vjerujem u anđele" as Tino (2009)
- "The White Crow" as ruski konobar (2018)
- "Elegija lovora" as Filip (2021)
- "Leto kada sam načila da letim" (2022)
