= Protest (film) =

1967 film by Fadil Hadžić

Protest is a 1967 Croatian language Yugoslav film directed by Fadil Hadžić, starring Bekim Fehmiu and Antun Vrdoljak.

== Plot ==
Ivo Bajsić (Bekim Fehmiu), a construction worker, commits suicide by jumping off a skyscraper in downtown Zagreb. Police investigator Marković (Antun Vrdoljak) tries to find out the motives behind his act by interviewing people who knew him: his wife, friends and coworkers. In flashbacks, Bajsić's history and the events that led to his suicide are gradually revealed. He is depicted as a controversial man: honest and hard-working, but also maladjusted and quick-tempered, even violent. Marković's investigation finds that he was recently fired from his job because he stood up against his company's corrupt director...

== Sources ==
- Protest at hrfilm.hr (in Croatian)
