= Night Boats =

- Film poster
- Croatian: Nocni brodovi
- Directed by: Igor Mirković
- Starring: Ana Karić; Radko Polič
- Release date: 15 March 2012
- Running time: 101 minutes
- Country: Croatia
- Language: Croatian

Night Boats (Croatian: Noćni brodovi) is a 2012 Croatian drama film directed by Igor Mirković.

== Cast ==
- Ana Karić as Helena
- Radko Polič as Jakov
- Renata Ulmanski as Olgica
- Lana Barić as Anja
- Bogdan Diklić as Marko
- Marija Geml as Tonka
- Mirna Medaković as Trafikantica
- Zvonimir Torjanac as Vlado
- Jadranka Đokić as Frizerka
- Pero Kvrgić as General

== Production ==
Lead actress Ana Káric considered her participation in the film to be "the role of a lifetime. Namely, she play[ed] a woman her age, a woman who, like a teenager, falls headlong in love with a man she met in a retirement home."

== Awards ==
The film received various awards:

- Best Film -Celebrating Age Award, Mumbai International Film Festival, India 2012.
- Award for Best Actress to Ani Karić - SEE a Paris (South East European Film Festival), France 2013.
- Golden Arena for the best leading female role - Ana Karić, Pula Film Festival 2012.
- Special Award for Feature Film - San Pedro International Film Festival, USA, 2012.
- Tree of Love Award - Ana Karić and Radko Polič, Film Days Mostar, Bosnia and Herzegovina 2012.
