= Karlo Bulić =

- Born: 12 May 1910; Trieste, Austrian Littoral, Austria-Hungary
- Died: 19 October 1986 (aged 76); Belgrade, SR Serbia, SFR Yugoslavia
- Occupation: Actor
- Years active: 1947–1984

Karlo Bulić (12 May 1910 – 19 October 1986) was a Croatian actor. He appeared in more than sixty films from 1947 to 1984. He is most famous for his lead role as Dotur Luigi in the legendary TV series Naše malo misto.

== Selected filmography ==
Year	Title	Role	Notes
1982	Cyclops		
1982	Servantes iz Malog Mista		
1978	Occupation in 26 Pictures		
1966	The Dream		
1961	Nebeski odred		
1960	The Fourteenth Day		
1955	Hanka		
1953	Perfidy		
