= From One Friday to the Next =

From One Friday to the Next (Od petka do petka) is a 1985 Croatian film directed by Antun Vrdoljak, starring Boris Dvornik and Zdravka Krstulović.
