= Fliers of the Open Skies =

Fliers of the Open Skies (Letači velikog neba) is a Yugoslav film directed by Marijan Arhanić and starring Boris Dvornik, Zvonko Lepetić and Milan Štrljić. It was released in 1977.
