= Servantes iz Malog Mista =

1982 film

Servantes iz Malog Mista is a Croatian film directed by Daniel Marušić and written by Miljenko Smoje, starring Ivica Vidović, Boris Dvornik, Karlo Bulić, Asja Kisić and Zvonko Lepetić. It was released in 1982.
