= Whatever You Can Spare =

- Directed by: Bogdan Žižić
- Written by: Krunoslav Quien; Bogdan Žižić
- Starring: Sreten Mokrović; Jasna Opalić; Zvonko Lepetić; Fabijan Šovagović
- Cinematography: Željko Guberović
- Edited by: Martin Tomić
- Music by: Ozren Depolo
- Production company: Jadran Film
- Release date: 1979
- Running time: 99 minutes
- Country: Yugoslavia
- Language: Serbo-Croatian

Whatever You Can Spare (Serbo-Croatian: Daj što daš) is a 1979 Yugoslav film directed by Bogdan Žižić.
