= The Emperor's New Clothes (1961 film) =

1961 film by Ante Babaja

The Emperor's New Clothes (Carevo novo ruho) is a 1961 Croatian film directed by Ante Babaja. It is based on Hans Christian Andersen's tale of the same name.

== Cast ==
- Zlatko Madunić as Nag
- Ana Karić as Verginija
- Stevo Vujatović as Car
- Aleksandra Violić as Carica
- Ivo Kadić as Ministar snova
- Antun Nalis as Kapetan straze
- Vanja Drach as Luda
- Josip Petričić as Skocibuha
- Zvonimir Rogoz as Vitez Senilan
- Mladen Serment as Riznicar
- Mirko Milisavljević as Mestar ceremonijala
- Emil Glad as Komornik
- Mato Grković as Inkvizitor
- Boris Buzančić as Ispovjednik
