= Tonko Lonza =

Croatian actor (1930–2018)

- Born: 29 September 1930; Zaton, Yugoslavia
- Died: 23 December 2018 (aged 88); Zagreb, Croatia
- Occupation: Actor
- Years active: 1959–2009

Tonko Lonza (29 September 1930 – 23 December 2018) was a Croatian actor. He appeared in more than thirty films since 1959.

== Filmography ==
Year	Title	Role	Notes
1959	Vrata ostaju otvorena		
1960	Signal Over the City	Bojnik Lukaric	
1972	The Deer Hunt	Doktor	
1973	Timon		
1979	Journalist	Mirko, glavni urednik	
1981	The Fall of Italy	Fra Blago	
1984	The Small Train Robbery	Carski inspektor	
1988	The Glembays	Ignjat-Naci Glembay	
1989	Donator	Galerista Ambroise Vollard	
1990	Carnival, Angel and Dust	Albert	(segment "Andjeo")
1990	Captain America	Tadzio's Mentor	
1991	Moj brat Aleksa		
1993	Countess Dora	Teodor Pejacevic	
1995	Gospa		
1996	The Seventh Chronicle	Doctor	
2009	Donkey	Pasko	
2009	Love Life of a Gentle Coward	Sasin tata	(final film role)

== Awards ==
- Vladimir Nazor Award for Life Achievement in Theatre (1992)
