= You Love Only Once =

1981 film

- Samo jednom se ljubi
- Directed by: Rajko Grlić
- Screenplay by: Rajko Grlić; Branko Šömen
- Story by: Ruža Jurković
- Produced by: Sulejman Kapić
- Starring: Miki Manojlović; Vladislava Milosavljević; Mladen Budiščak; Zijah Sokolović; Erland Josephson
- Cinematography: Tomislav Pinter
- Edited by: Živka Toplak
- Music by: Branislav Živković
- Production company: Jadran Film
- Distributed by: Croatia Film
- Release date: 4 February 1981 (Yugoslavia)
- Running time: 103 minutes
- Country: Yugoslavia
- Language: Serbo-Croatian

You Love Only Once (Serbo-Croatian Latin: Samo jednom se ljubi, also released as The Melody Haunts My Memory) is a 1981 Yugoslavian drama film directed by Rajko Grlić. It competed in the Un Certain Regard section at the 1981 Cannes Film Festival. In 1999, a poll of Croatian film critics said it to be one of the best Croatian films ever made.

== Cast ==
- Miki Manojlović as Tomislav (as Predrag Manojlović)
- Vladislava Milosavljević as Beba (as Vladica Milosavljević)
- Mladen Budiščak as Vule
- Zijah Sokolović as Mirko
- Erland Josephson as Rudolf, Beba's father
- Dragoljub Lazarov as Pero
- Neva Rošić as Elizabeta, Beba's mother
- Miljenko Brlečić as Doctor
- Zvonko Lepetić as Party official
- Maja Freundlich as Maid
- Edo Peročević as Prison keeper
- Jagoda Kaloper as Jagoda

== Sources ==
- Pavičić, Jurica (2004). "Žudnja vlasti i vlast nad žudnjom: Samo jednom se ljubi Rajka Grlića" [The passion for power and power over passion: Rajko Grlić's You Love Only Once] (PDF). Hrvatski Filmski Ljetopis (in Croatian). 10 (40). Zagreb: Croatian Film Association: 45–56.
