= Izet Hajdarhodžić =

Croatian actor

- Born: 25 December 1929; Trebinje, Kingdom of Serbs, Croats and Slovenes
- Died: 12 December 2006 (aged 76); Zagreb, Croatia
- Occupation: Actor
- Years active: 1967–1989
- Relatives: Gita Haydar (granddaughter)

Izet Hajdarhodžić (25 December 1929 – 12 December 2006) was a Croatian actor. He appeared in more than thirty films from 1967 to 1989.

== Selected filmography ==
Year	Title	Role	Notes
1982	The Smell of Quinces		
1979	Journalist		
1978	Bravo maestro		
1978	Occupation in 26 Pictures		
1974	A Performance of Hamlet in the Village of Mrduša Donja		
1969	When You Hear the Bells		
1967	Kaya		
