= The Secret of an Old Attic =

- Directed by: Vladimir Tadej
- Written by: Vladimir Tadej
- Starring: Špiro Guberina, Boris Dvornik, Mia Oremović, Jan Kanyza, Miloš Kopecký, Petar Jelaska, Edo Peročević, Mario Mirković, Jiří Guryča, Nina Petrović
- Music by: Arsen Dedić
- Production company: Croatia Film / Filmové Studio Gottwaldov
- Release date: 18 October 1984
- Running time: 101 minute
- Countries: Croatia (then part of SFR Yugoslavia); Czechoslovakia
- Languages: Croatian (during the most parts of the film), and Czech (in some small parts of the film)

The Secret of an Old Attic (Tajna starog tavana) is a Croatian-Czechoslovak children's film directed by Vladimir Tadej. It was released in 1984.
