= The Steppe (1962 film) =

1962 film

- Film poster
- Directed by: Alberto Lattuada
- Written by: Anton Chekhov; Enzo Curreli; Alberto Lattuada; Tullio Pinelli
- Produced by: Moris Ergas
- Starring: Charles Vanel
- Cinematography: Enzo Serafin
- Edited by: Leo Cattozzo
- Music by: Guido Turchi
- Release date: June 1962
- Running time: 100 minutes
- Countries: Italy; France; Yugoslavia
- Language: Italian

The Steppe (Italian: La steppa) is a 1962 Italian adventure film directed by Alberto Lattuada. It was entered into the 12th Berlin International Film Festival. It is based on the Anton Chekhov's novella with the same name.

== Cast ==
- Charles Vanel - Pére Christophore
- Daniele Spallone - Iégoruska
- Cristina Gajoni - La fille du fleuve
- Pavle Vuisić - Kuzmiciov (as Pavle Vuisic´)
- Marina Vlady - Comtesse Dranitsky
- Pero Kvrgić - Mossèi
- Michèle Bailly - La Gitane
- Ljuba Tadić - Jemelian (as Juba Tadic)
- Milan Bosiljcic
- Ljiljana Krstić
- Marianne Leibl
- Milorad Majic - Pantalei
- Natasha Petrova
- Hermina Pipinić - Olga Ivanovna
- Petar Prlicko
- Paolo Stoppa
