= Ana Karić =

Croatian actress (1941–2014)

- Born: 13 May 1941; Perušić, Independent State of Croatia
- Died: 9 October 2014 (aged 73); Zagreb, Croatia
- Education: Academy of Dramatic Art
- Alma mater: University of Zagreb
- Occupation: Actress
- Years active: 1961–2013

Ana Karić (pronounced [âna kaːritɕ, ǎː-]; 13 May 1941 – 9 October 2014) was a Croatian actress. She started acting in the early 1960s even before graduating from the Zagreb Academy of Dramatic Art in 1963. Although primarily a television actress, she also appeared in numerous film and theatre productions.

Karić starred in a number of notable films produced in Croatia and directed by Croatian directors such as Ante Babaja, Nikola Tanhofer, Zvonimir Berković and Krsto Papić.

She won a Golden Arena for Best Actress in 2012 for a starring role in Night Boats, a romantic drama film directed by Igor Mirković. Karić died on 9 October 2014 in Zagreb, aged 73.

== Selected filmography ==
- Accidental Life (Slučajni život, 1969)
- The Scene of the Crash (Putovanje na mjesto nesreće, 1971)
- The House (Kuća, 1975)
- That's the Way the Cookie Crumbles (Živi bili pa vidjeli, 1979)
- The Secret of Nikola Tesla (Tajna Nikole Tesle, 1980)
- Donator (1989)
- Charuga (Čaruga, 1991)
- Fragments: Chronicle of a Vanishing (Krhotine - Kronika jednog nestajanja, 1991)
- Russian Meat (Rusko meso, 1997)
- Pont Neuf (1997)
- Infection (Infekcija, 2003)
- Night Boats (Noćni brodovi, 2012)
