= Božidar Alić =

Croatian film and television actor (1954–2020)

- Born: 24 December 1954; Zagreb, PR Croatia, Yugoslavia
- Died: 3 March 2020 (aged 65); Zagreb, Croatia
- Education: Academy of Dramatic Art; University of Zagreb
- Occupation: Actor
- Years active: 1977–2020
- Spouse: Sanda Alić (m. 2007)
- Children: 1

Božidar Alić (24 December 1954 – 3 March 2020) was a Croatian actor.

== Early life and education ==
Alić was born on 24 December 1954 in Zagreb, Yugoslavia. He graduated from the Academy of Dramatic Arts of the University of Zagreb.

== Career ==
Alić was known for playing Gordogan in Kralj Gordogan, Puba Fabriczy in Gospoda Glembajevi (The Glembays), and the title role in Shakespeare's Coriolanus at the Dubrovnik Summer Festival. His first major film role was in Akcija stadion (1977). Other film credits included Treći ključ (1983), U logoru, Kamenita vrata, Četverored and Duga mračna noć (2004).

His acting career was damaged by his right-wing political stances. He was ostracized by the Croatian association of dramatic artists for his statement in which he portrayed political opponents of Kolinda Grabar-Kitarović as Chetniks and Serb lovers. After this incident he left the Association.

== Personal life ==
Božidar Alić married his wife Sanda in 2007. She gave birth to their son, Ratimir, in 2010.

Alić was known for his conservative political views. He supported Kolinda Grabar-Kitarović in the 2014–15 Croatian presidential election.

== Death ==
Alić died in Zagreb on 3 March 2020, at age 65.

== Filmography ==
=== Television ===
Year	Title	Role
1986	Putovanje u Vučjak	Štefina
1993	Tales of Mystery and Imagination	Egaeus
2005	Milijun eura	Mecena
2005	Naša mala klinika	Stanislav Podpečanac
2005	Zabranjena ljubav	Jure Vuković
2006	Ljubav u zaleđu	Inspector
2006-2007	Obični ljudi	Producer
2006-2007	Cimmer fraj	Hans Haltersniffer
2007-2008	Ponos Ratkajevih	Karlo pl. Ratkaj
2009	Najbolje godine	Vuk Hajduk
2010	Instruktor	Italian tester

=== Film ===
Year	Title	Role
1977	Operation Stadium	Ferko
1978	Istarska rapsodija	?
1979	That's the Way the Cookie Crumbles	Mate Alić
1981	O ovom pretužnom događaju	?
1981	Obiteljski album	Son
1983	U logoru	Horvat
1983	U logoru	Horvat
1983	The Third Key	Zvonko Kršlak
1983	Pijanist	Maks
1984	Pod starim krovovima	?
1984	Memed, My Hawk	?
1984	Nadia	?
1985	Zadatak	Karlo
1988	Eksperiment profesora Hinčića	Hinko Hinčić
1988	Smrt godišnjeg doba	Ivan
1991	Memories of Midnight	Frederick Stavros
1991	Pizza Colonia	Roncati
1992	The Stone Gate	?
1992	Papa Siksto V	?
1992	Sestre	?
1992	The Sands of Time	?
1995	Olovna pričest	?
1998	Agonija	Barun Lenbach
1999	Četverored	Vasa
2001	The Miroslav Holding Co.	?
2002	Remembrance of Georgia	Dr. Polimac
2003	Infection	General Genz
2003	Milost mora	?
2004	Long Dark Night	Jakob
2004	Jeruzalemski sindrom	?
2006-2007	Obični ljudi	Producer
2005	Pušća Bistra	Potato salesman
2006	Kravata	Aleksandar "Acan" Hranilović
2006	Crveno i crno	Customer
2012	Inspector Martin and the Gang of Snails	Inspector Martin
2016	Someone Dies Tonight	Stipe
