= The Way to Paradise (film) =

- Croatian: Put u raj
- Directed by: Mario Fanelli
- Written by: Miroslav Krleža
- Starring: Boris Buzančić; Ljuba Tadić; Zvonko Strmac; Mato Grković; Snežana Nikšić; Branka Strmac; Relja Bašić; Antun Nalis; Svjetlana Knežević
- Cinematography: Tomislav Pinter
- Edited by: Radojka Tanhofer
- Music by: Nikica Kalogjera
- Production companies: Jadran Film; TV Zagreb
- Release date: 17 November 1970
- Running time: 96 minutes

The Way to Paradise (Put u raj) is a 1970 Croatian film directed by Mario Fanelli and written by Miroslav Krleža, starring Boris Buzančić and Ljuba Tadić. Krleža based the script on his own novellas The Cricket under a Waterfall and The Finale. It was the first film adaptation of his literary work, and the only one he was personally involved with. The film was made for Television Zagreb and is the first ever Croatian television film.

== Plot ==
A man dies and goes to heaven, escaping the predicament of the modern civilisation. However, once there, he encounters similar people and situations.

== Cast ==
- Boris Buzančić as Professor Bernardo Leander
- Ljuba Tadić as the doctor
- Zvonko Strmac as chief physician
- Mato Grković as priest from the sarcophagus
- Snežana Nikšić as Miss Amalija
- Svjetlana Knežević as Marijana
- Zvonko Lepetić as Ensign Bandera
- Jovan Ličina as chief physician's patient
- Branko Supek as Cadet Rizling
- Relja Bašić as Kristian Pendrekovski
- Viktor Starčić as Baron Silvester
- Dragan Milivojević as first councillor to the embassy
- Antun Nalis as surgeon
- Vladimir Medar as chemist
- Branka Strmac as the lady with the black hat
- Ljiljana Gazdić as the woman who committed suicide from a window

== Reception ==
The film was poorly received at the time of its release. Croatian cinema historian Ivo Škrabalo described it as a film where "Krležian rhetoric was not completed by suggestive development of the plot, so that one could hear only an outpouring of words on the screen, without connected connotations found in literature." The film did not enter competition at the 1971 Pula Film Festival.

Krleža disagreed with the critics of The Way to Paradise who had argued that extensive "meditative dialogue" dominated the film, maintaining his belief that "the human word in a film is equivalent to camera" and that without it, film is "merely commedia dell'arte and nothing else". Nevertheless, he was disappointed by the reception, and denied permissions for film adaptations of his works for the rest of his life.
