= The Price of Life (1994 film) =

- Directed by: Bogdan Žižić
- Written by: Fabijan Šovagović; Bogdan Žižić
- Starring: Slavko Juraga; Barbara Vicković; Ivan Tomljenović; Edo Peročević
- Cinematography: Goran Trbuljak
- Edited by: Martin Tomić
- Music by: Rajko Dujmić
- Release date: 1994
- Running time: 103 minutes
- Country: Croatia
- Language: Croatian

The Price of Life (Croatian: Cijena života) is a 1994 Croatian film directed by Bogdan Žižić.

== Cast ==
- Slavko Juraga - Ivan
- Barbara Vicković - Anica
- Ivan Tomljenović - Stevan
- Edo Peročević - Tuco
- Goran Grgić - Dusan
- Ivan Brkić - Vaso
