= Hanka (film) =

1955 film

- Film poster
- Directed by: Slavko Vorkapić
- Written by: Isak Samokovlija
- Starring: Mira Stupica
- Cinematography: Milenko Stojanović
- Edited by: Slavko Vorkapić
- Release date: 1955
- Running time: 132 minutes
- Country: Yugoslavia
- Language: Serbo-Croatian
- Budget: 110,000,000 dinars (approx. $300,000)

Hanka is a 1955 Yugoslavian film directed by Slavko Vorkapić. It was entered into the 1956 Cannes Film Festival. In 2025, a digital version of the film was screened on 14 August as pre-festival presentation at the 31st Sarajevo Film Festival.

== Plot ==
The film centers around Muslim gypsies in Bosnia. Cinematic writer Georges Sadoul described Hanka as a "story of love and revenge among gypsies" in his book Dictionary of Film Makers.

== Cast ==
- Vera Gregović - Hanka
- Mira Stupica - Ajkuna
- Mihajlo Mrvaljević - Mušan
- Jovan Milicević - Sejdo
- Safet Pašalić - Propali Beg
- Karlo Bulić
- Dejan Dubajić - Sluga
- Jelena Keseljević - Majka
- Vaso Kosić - Ceribasa
- Predrag Laković
- Mavid Popović - Kapetan
- Aleksandar Stojković
- Dragutin Todić - Upravnik imanja
