= Daredevil's Time =

Daredevil's Time (Hajdučka vremena) is a Yugoslavian film directed by Vladimir Tadej. It was released in 1977.
