= The Fourteenth Day =

1960 film

- Directed by: Zdravko Velimirović
- Written by: Borislav Pekić; Zdravko Velimirović
- Starring: Nikola Popović
- Cinematography: Vladeta Lukic
- Edited by: Katarina Stojanovic
- Release date: 1960
- Running time: 101 minutes
- Country: Yugoslavia
- Language: Serbo-Croatian

The Fourteenth Day (Serbo-Croatian: Dan četrnaesti / Дан четрнаести) is a 1960 Yugoslav crime film directed by Zdravko Velimirović. It was entered into the 1961 Cannes Film Festival. In July 2021, the film was shown in the Cannes Classics section at the 2021 Cannes Film Festival.

== Cast ==
- Nikola Popović - Timotije Marković
- Karlo Bulić - Žorž Arsenijević
- Slobodan Perović - Pavle Malbaški
- Dušan Janićijević - Tomislav Radin
- Olga Spiridonović - Emilija
- Mira Stupica - Kristina
- Hermina Pipinić - Marija
- Mira Nikolić - Ljiljana (as Mira Nikolić-Babović)
- Viktor Starčić - Žoržov otac
- Rahela Ferari - Sofija
- Branko Tatić - Maksa
- Jovan Gec - Recepcioner
- Ljuba Kovačević
- Zlatko Madunić - Kondukter
- Janez Vrhovec - Službenik SUP-a
- Bekim Fehmiu - Police man
