= Passing Days =

Passing Days (Idu dani) is a 1970 Croatian film directed by Fadil Hadžić, starring Ivica Vidović.
