= Playing Soldiers =

1967 film

- Directed by: Bahrudin Čengić
- Written by: Mirko Kovač
- Starring: Stole Aranđelović
- Cinematography: Aleksandar Vesligaj
- Edited by: Marija Fuks
- Release date: 1967
- Running time: 92 minutes
- Country: Yugoslavia
- Language: Serbo-Croatian

Playing Soldiers (Serbo-Croatian: Mali vojnici) is a 1967 Yugoslav film directed by Bahrudin Čengić. It was listed to compete at the 1968 Cannes Film Festival, but the festival was cancelled due to the events of May 1968 in France.

== Cast ==
- Stole Aranđelović
- Marika Tucanovska
- Zaim Muzaferija
- Zlatko Madunić
- Mija Aleksić
- Zdravko Andrijašević
- Sead Čakal
- Darko Cerar
- Mirsad Ibišević
- Gordan Kulić
- Živko Odak
- Duško Savić
- Milorad Vođević
