= Dragan Milivojević =

Croatian actor

- Born: 5 November 1938; Podgorica, Zeta Banovina, Kingdom of Yugoslavia
- Died: 22 October 1993 (aged 54); Zagreb, Croatia
- Occupation: Actor
- Years active: 1960–1992

Dragan Milivojević (5 November 1938 - 22 October 1993) was a Croatian actor. He appeared in more than sixty films from 1960 to 1992.

== Selected filmography ==
Year	Title	Role	Notes
1960	The Ninth Circle	Zvonko	
1969	Accidental Life		
1982	Cyclops	Fredi	
1990	The Magician's Hat	car Mrazomor	voice
