= The Scene of the Crash =

- Directed by: Zvonimir Berković
- Starring: Ana Karić; Rade Šerbedžija; Emil Kutijaro; Nataša Maričić; Stevo Žigon
- Cinematography: Aleksandar Petković
- Edited by: Katja Majer
- Music by: Alfi Kabiljo
- Production company: Jadran Film
- Release date: 9 February 1971
- Running time: 94 minutes
- Country: Yugoslavia
- Language: Serbo-Croatian

The Scene of the Crash (Croatian: Putovanje na mjesto nesreće) is a 1971 Yugoslav drama film directed by Zvonimir Berković.

== Plot ==
The film centers on Jelena (Ana Karic), a young woman whose life is upended by a catastrophic car crash that kills her husband and child. Struggling with immense grief and guilt, Jelena embarks on a journey of self-discovery and healing. She encounters various characters who each have their own stories of loss and redemption, helping her to gradually come to terms with her past and allow the courtship of her suitor Vlatko (Rade Serbedzija).

== Development ==
The film was produced by Avala Film, one of the most prominent production companies in Yugoslavia at the time. The screenplay by Ana Petrović is noted for its poignant and introspective dialogue, which captures the emotional turmoil of the protagonist. The cinematography by Živorad Žika Nikolić utilizes the stark, desolate landscapes of rural Yugoslavia to mirror Jelena's inner desolation.

== Reception ==
Upon its release, The Scene of the Crash was critically acclaimed for its powerful performances and profound narrative. Ana Karic's portrayal of Jelena was particularly lauded. The film was praised for its sensitive and realistic depiction of grief and recovery, resonating with audiences and critics alike.
