= Don't Look Back, My Son =

- Serbo-Croatian: Ne okreći se, sine
- Directed by: Branko Bauer
- Written by: Branko Bauer; Arsen Diklić
- Starring: Bert Sotlar; Zlatko Lukman
- Cinematography: Branko Blažina
- Edited by: Boris Tešija
- Music by: Bojan Adamič
- Production company: Jadran Film
- Release date: 16 July 1956
- Running time: 111 minutes
- Country: Yugoslavia
- Language: Serbo-Croatian

Don't Look Back, My Son, also known as My Son, Don't Turn Round (Serbo-Croatian: Ne okreći se, sine / Не окрећи се, сине) in the United States, is a 1956 Yugoslav film by Croatian director Branko Bauer. It is adapted into a children's novel by the co-writer Arsen Diklić.

In 1999, a poll of Croatian film critics found it to be the eighth greatest Croatian film ever made.

== Plot ==
During World War II, engineer Neven Novak, a member of the illegal Partisan resistance, escapes from a train with which the Ustashas are transporting prisoners to Jasenovac. After a successful escape, he tries to rescue his son Zoran, a boy who has been indoctrinated into Ustasha and Nazi-fascist ideology, from the Ustasha children's home in Zagreb. When Zoran learns that his father is an enemy of the regime, he refuses to flee with him to Partisan territory. Novak is faced with his son's resistance and increased pressure that the police and agents are placing on him.

== Cast ==
- Bert Sotlar as Neven Novak
- Zlatko Lukman as Zoran Novak
- Lila Andres as Vera
- Radojko Ježić as Leo
- Zlatko Madunić as agent
- Tihomir Polanec as shoe cleaner
- Marija Merlić as Paola
- Viki Glovacki as porter
- Branko Špoljar as Brkić
- Nikša Stefanini as head of Ustasha unit
- Mladen Šerment as gravedigger
- Ivo Pajić as Ustasha
- Kruno Valentić as policeman
- Stjepan Jurčević as Ivica's father

== Awards ==
- Pula Film Festival, 1956 - Golden Arena for Best Film
