= Bravo maestro =

1978 film

- Directed by: Rajko Grlić
- Written by: Rajko Grlić; Srdjan Karanović
- Produced by: Sulejman Kapic
- Starring: Rade Šerbedžija
- Cinematography: Živko Zalar
- Edited by: Zivka Toplak
- Release date: 8 February 1978
- Running time: 99 minutes
- Country: Yugoslavia
- Language: Serbo-Croatian

Bravo maestro is a 1978 Yugoslavian drama film directed by Rajko Grlić. It was entered into the 1978 Cannes Film Festival.

== Plot ==
Vitomir Bezjak graduated from the Academy of Music in Zagreb near the top of his class. After graduation, he lives a bohemian lifestyle, working on his compositions while unsuccessfully looking for a source of income. After his girlfriend leaves him, he reluctantly takes up a job as a piano teacher. He falls in love and marries a rich widow whose son he has been teaching. After her father introduces him to a number of influential people, Bezjak's life dramatically changes: he becomes a household name and starts to appear in various meetings and events, gradually gaining political influence. As he drifts away from the musical world, it becomes apparent he is no longer the talented young man he used to be. When his long-awaited major orchestral work is performed for the first time, he gets accused of plagiarism, and a scandal erupts.

== Cast ==
- Rade Šerbedžija - Vitomir Bezjak
- Aleksandar Berček - Tomo
- Božidar Boban - Jaksa Radic
- Mladen Budiščak - Mladen
- Koraljka Hrs - Iva Budic
- Ante Vican - Ivin otac Mate
- Zvonko Lepetić - Vinko Katunic
- Ivo Jurisa - Ivan
- Radojka Šverko - Roza
- Izet Hajdarhodžić - Blagoje Boric
- Angel Palasev - Stanko Miric
- Zlata Petković - Sonja
- Marjeta Gregorac - (as Marieta Gregorac)
- Marija Kohn - Cistacica
- Kostadinka Velkovska
- Petar Dobrić
- Branko Cvejić - Predsjednik savjeta
- Vladimir Krstulović - (as Vlado Krstulovic)
- Neda Ritz
- Pero Zlatar
