= Hitler from Our Street =

Hitler from Our Street (Hitler iz našeg sokaka) is a Yugoslav film directed by Vladimir Tadej. It was released in 1975.
