= When You Hear the Bells =

- Croatian: Kad čuješ zvona
- Directed by: Antun Vrdoljak
- Written by: Antun Vrdoljak
- Based on: Ratni dnevnik by Ivan Šibl
- Produced by: Sulejman Kapic
- Starring: Boris Buzančić
- Cinematography: Frano Vodopivec
- Release date: 1969
- Running time: 92 minutes
- Country: Yugoslavia
- Language: Croatian

When You Hear the Bells (Croatian: Kad čuješ zvona) is a 1969 Yugoslav Croatian-language war film directed by Antun Vrdoljak. It was entered into the 6th Moscow International Film Festival where it won a Silver Prize.

In 1999, a poll of Croatian film critics found it to be one of the best Croatian films ever made.

== Cast ==
- Boris Buzančić as Vjeko
- Pavle Vuisić as Gara
- Boris Dvornik as Kubura
- Fabijan Šovagović as Mićan
- Ivica Vidović as Meho
- Branka Vrdoljak as Marija
- Vanja Drach as Maks
- Antun Nalis as Charles / Topnik
- Izet Hajdarhodžić as Nikola
- Branko Špoljar as the battalion commander
- Mirko Boman as the Partisan
