= The Eleventh Commandment (1970 film) =

The Eleventh Commandment (Jedanaesta zapovijed) is a Croatian film directed by Vanča Kljaković. It stars Dragomir Bojanić and Vesna Malohodzic. It was released in 1970.
