= Donator =

1989 Croatian film

- Directed by: Veljko Bulajić
- Written by: Ivo Brešan
- Starring: Ljubimir lodorovic Peter Carsten
- Cinematography: Boris Turković
- Edited by: Sandra Botica
- Music by: Arsen Dedić
- Release date: 1989
- Language: Croatian

Donator is a 1989 Yugoslav drama film directed by Veljko Bulajić. It was screened at the 46th Venice International Film Festival, in the Venezia Notte (Venice Night) sidebar.

== Cast ==
- Ljubimir lodorovic as Eric Slomovic
- Peter Carsten as Siegfried Handke
- Urska Hlebec as Juana
- Charles Millot as Francois Yvette
- Ana Karić as Rosa Slomovie
- Tonko Lonza as Ambroise Vollard
