= Deps =

Deps is a 1974 Yugoslavian film directed by Antun Vrdoljak and starring Bekim Fehmiu, Milena Dravić, Fabijan Šovagović and Relja Bašić.
