= Ivan Šibl =

Yugoslav and Croatian Partisan general, writer and politician

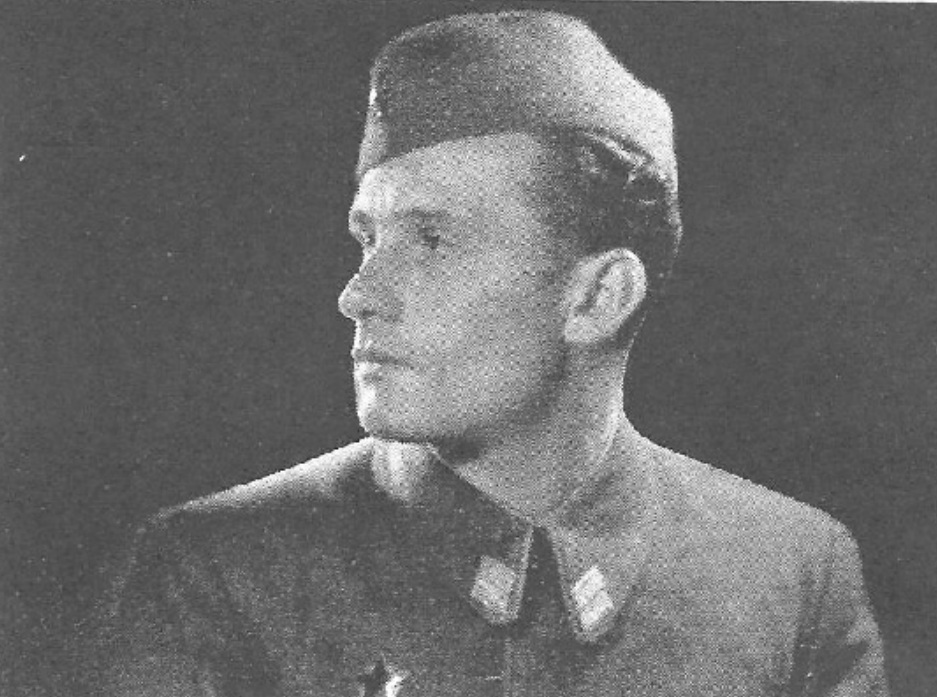
- Portrait of Ivan Šibl
- Born: 28 October 1917; Virovitica, Croatia-Slavonia, Austria-Hungary
- Died: 30 March 1989 (aged 71) Zagreb, SR Croatia, SFR Yugoslavia
- Allegiance: Yugoslav Partisans; Yugoslav People's Army
- Rank: Lieutenant Colonel General

Ivan Šibl (28 October 1917 – 30 March 1989) was a high-ranking Yugoslav People's Army officer, writer and politician, best known for his activities as a senior state official in SR Croatia in decades after World War II.

Born in Virovitica in modern-day northwest Croatia, Šibl joined the anti-fascist movement led by the Communist Party of Yugoslavia (KPJ) after the outbreak of World War II. He was a member of a clandestine resistance group in Zagreb before becoming KPJ's commissar of the Banija Partisan Detachment, and then the commissar of the Kalnik Partisan Detachment in 1942.The following year, Šibl became the commissar of the Yugoslav Partisans 2nd Operational Zone, and in 1944–1945 the KPJ's commissar of the 10th Corps of the Yugoslav Army.

After the war, Šibl was the editor-in-chief of Borba, the official gazette of the KPJ, from 1953 to 1954 in Belgrade, and then was made director-general of Radio Television Zagreb (RTV Zagreb) in 1954, a position he held until 1963. Also in 1954 Šibl was appointed member of the Central Committee of the Communist Party of Croatia, and also served as member of the Croatian Sabor and the Yugoslav Parliament in several terms.

In his later years, from 1969 to 1971, he was the head of the Croatian Association of Veterans of the National Liberation War.

During the events of the so-called Croatian Spring which culminated in 1971 Šibl was one of the senior state officials who supported the reformist leadership led by Savka Dabčević-Kučar and Miko Tripalo. Following their defeat and political suppression in late 1971 Šibl was stripped from all party and state functions.

Starting in the 1950s Šibl began writing and publishing works which are said to contain "autobiographical elements." His works were later used as the basis for screenplays for film adaptations, for movies such as We're Going Separate Ways ("Naši putovi se razilaze," 1957); When You Hear the Bells ("Kad čuješ zvona", 1969); The Pine Tree in the Mountain ("U gori raste zelen bor", 1971).

Šibl is best known for his works of non-fiction in which he documented his experiences during World War II, such as Zagrebačka oblast u narodnooslobodilačkoj borbi ("Zagreb District in the People's Liberation Struggle"), Iz ilegalnog Zagreba 1941 ("From Clandestine Zagreb 1941"), Partizanski razgovori ("Partisan Talks"), Ratni dnevnik ("Wartime Diary"), and Sjećanja ("Memories").

The Lifetime Achievement Award given by Croatia's state broadcasting company Hrvatska radiotelevizija (HRT), the successor to RTV Zagreb, is named after Šibl.
