= Slow Motion (1979 film) =

Slow Motion (Usporeno kretanje) is a Croatian film directed by Vanča Kljaković. It was released in 1979.
