= Zadarski memento =

Zadarski memento is a Croatian film directed by Joakim Marušić. It was released in 1984.
