= The Salonika Terrorists =

1961 Macedonian film

- Directed by: Žika Mitrović
- Screenplay by: Jovan Boškovski
- Produced by: Artur Brauner
- Starring: Nikola Avtovski, Istref Begolli, Marlies Behrens, Stojka Cekova, Darko Damevski, Aleksandar Gavrić, Aleksandar Gruden, Jon Isaja, Panče Kamdžik, Miodrag Lončar, Dara Milošević, Joakim Mok, Dragan Ocokoljić, Petre Prličko, Nikola Popov, Stevo Spasovski, Zlatibor Stoimirov, Marko Todorović
- Cinematography: Ljube Petkovski
- Edited by: Katarina Stojanović
- Music by: Dušan Radić
- Production company: Vardar Film
- Release date: 1961
- Running time: 103 minutes
- Country: SR Macedonia (now North Macedonia)
- Languages: Macedonian, French

The Salonika Terrorists (Macedonian: Солунските Атентатори, Solunskite Atentatori literally "The Salonika Assassins"), also known as The Assassins from Salonika, is a 1961 Yugoslav film. It follows the story of the Boatmen of Thessaloniki.

== Awards ==
- "Jelen" (FYIF, 1961) — traditional award from the public;
- "Special diploma for Production Design" (1961) — awarded to Dime Šumka;
- "Jury Award for the Successful Cultivation of the Action Film Genre" (1961) - awarded to Žika Mitrović
