= Operation Stadium =

- Directed by: Dušan Vukotić
- Written by: Slavko Goldstein, Dušan Vukotić
- Starring: Igor Galo; Franjo Majetić; Zvonko Lepetić
- Cinematography: Ivica Rajković
- Edited by: Damir German
- Music by: Tomica Simović
- Production companies: Zagreb Film; Kinematografi; Dunav Film
- Release date: 8 July 1977
- Country: Croatia (then SFR Yugoslavia)
- Languages: Croatian; Serbian

Operation Stadium (Serbo-Croatian: Akcija stadion) is a 1977 Croatian film directed by Dušan Vukotić.

== Cast ==
- Igor Galo - Kruno
- Franjo Majetić - Stric Luka
- Zvonimir Črnko - Lujo Verdar
- Božidar Alić - Ferko
- Zvonko Lepetić - Stožernik Rubac
- Darko Srića - Otto
- Nataša Hržić - Milena
- Jadranka Stilin - Nada
- Božidar Košćak - Lima
- Boris Kralj - Professor Mraović
- Hermina Pipinić - Gospođa Mraović
- Zlatko Madunić - Povjerenik ustaškog redarstva
- Slobodan Dimitrijević - Sturmbannführer Ebner
- Dušan Janićijević - Instruktor Reiner
