= Love and Some Swear Words =

Love and Some Swear Words (Ljubav i poneka psovka) is a Croatian film directed by Antun Vrdoljak and starring Boris Dvornik, Ružica Sokić, and Boris Buzančić. It was released in 1969. It was shown at the 17th Pula Film Festival in the summer of 1970.
