= Ivo Serdar =

Croatian actor

Ivo Serdar (19 December 1933 – 21 November 1985) was a popular Croatian actor.

Born in Gornji Miklouš (part of Čazma) in central Croatia (then Yugoslavia) in 1933, Serdar graduated from the Academy of Dramatic Art of the University of Zagreb. He was a member of a theater group in Varaždin, and later joined the Croatian National Theatre in Zagreb. He played many television roles, including in comedies, and theater roles. His two sons are Ivo Serdar and Ivana Serdar. Among his many television appearances (and by no means his most prominent), he also was a co-host with Stevo Karapandža of the popular Yugoslav weekly cooking show Male tajne velikih majstora kuhinje (Little Secrets of Great Chefs) produced by TV Zagreb, which started in 1974.

Serdar died in Zagreb in 1985 at age 51.
