= The House (1975 film) =

- Directed by: Bogdan Žižić
- Written by: Željko Senečić; Bogdan Žižić
- Starring: Fabijan Šovagović; Jagoda Kaloper; Rade Marković; Ana Karić
- Cinematography: Tomislav Pinter
- Edited by: Radojka Tanhofer
- Music by: Tomica Simović
- Production companies: Croatia Film; Jadran Film
- Release date: 10 July 1975
- Running time: 91 minutes
- Country: Yugoslavia
- Language: Serbo-Croatian

The House (Serbo-Croatian: Kuća) is a 1975 Yugoslav film directed by Bogdan Žižić.

== Plot ==
Branko (Fabijan Šovagović), a 50-year-old director of an export-import company accidentally meets Seka (Jagoda Kaloper), a much younger woman. She mentions a large house that belonged to her parents which was unjustly confiscated by the government after World War II. Branko, who has fallen in love with Seka and proposed to her, spares no effort so that the house can be returned to her. Due to his good connections, he succeeds. However, the house needs renovation, and his salary is not sufficient, so in order to please his young wife, he resorts to illegal activities...

== Reception and legacy ==
The House won a Big Golden Arena for Best Film at the 1975 Pula Film Festival. Nevertheless, at the time it was perceived as a not particularly daring political film, and it faded into obscurity in the following decades.

In 2007, Croatian film critic Nenad Polimac listed The House in his selection of "lost classics" of Croatian cinema, describing it as a "socialist film noir".
