= A Performance of Hamlet in the Village of Mrduša Donja =

1974 film

- Film poster
- Croatian: Predstava Hamleta u Mrduši Donjoj
- Directed by: Krsto Papić
- Written by: Krsto Papić
- Story by: Ivo Brešan
- Based on: Predstava Hamleta u selu Mrduša Donja by Ivo Breša Hamlet by William Shakespeare
- Produced by: Sulejman Kapić
- Starring: Rade Šerbedžija; Milena Dravić; Krešimir Zidarić
- Cinematography: Vjenceslav Orešković
- Edited by: Lida Branis
- Release date: 31 July 1973 (20th Pula Film Festival)
- Running time: c. 95 minutes (85 minutes according to some sources)
- Country: Yugoslavia
- Language: Croatian

A Performance of Hamlet in the Village of Mrduša Donja (Croatian: Predstava Hamleta u Mrduši Donjoj) is a 1973 Yugoslav drama film directed by Krsto Papić, and based on Ivo Brešan's 1971 play of the same name.

== Cast ==
- Rade Šerbedžija as Joco / Hamlet
- Milena Dravić as Anđa / Ophelia
- Krešimir Zidarić as Bukara / the King
- Fabijan Šovagović as the teacher Andro
- Izet Hajdarhodžić as Joco's father
- Ljubiša Samardžić as Mačak
- Mate Ergović as Simurina
- Zvonko Lepetić as Mile
- Zdenka Heršak as Mara
- Ilija Ivezić
- Ivo Pajić
- Slavica Maras
- Rikard Brzeska
- Nevenka Šajin
- Branko Matić
- Jovan Stefanović
