= The Last Mission of Demolitions Man Cloud =

- Directed by: Vatroslav Mimica
- Written by: Vatroslav Mimica
- Starring: Pavle Vuisić; Slavica Jukić; Miki Manojlović; Ratko Buljan; Jagoda Kaloper; Marina Nemet; Ivica Pajer
- Cinematography: Božidar Nikolić
- Edited by: Vuksan Lukovac
- Music by: Marijan Makar
- Release date: 1978
- Running time: 108 minutes
- Country: Yugoslavia
- Language: Serbo-Croatian

The Last Mission of Demolitions Man Cloud (Croatian: Posljednji podvig diverzanta Oblaka) is a 1978 Yugoslav feature film directed by Vatroslav Mimica.
