= Gold, Frankincense and Myrrh =

1971 film

Gold, Frankincense and Myrrh (Mirisi, zlato i tamjan) is a 1971 Croatian film directed by Ante Babaja. It is based on the 1968 novel of the same name by Slobodan Novak.
