= Snowstorm (film) =

1977 film by Antun Vrdoljak

Snowstorm (Croatian: Mećava) is a 1977 Yugoslavian Croatian-language film directed by Antun Vrdoljak. It is based on a play of the same name by Pero Budak.

The film stars Ivo Gregurević in the role of Ivan.

It is one of the many adaptations of literary works directed by Vrdoljak.
