= Marija Kohn =

Croatian actress (1934–2018)

- Born: 7 August 1934; Lopud, Zeta Banovina, Kingdom of Yugoslavia
- Died: 16 July 2018 (aged 83); Zagreb, Croatia
- Occupation: Actress
- Years active: 1957–2018
- Awards: Vladimir Nazor Award for Lifetime Achievement in Theatre (2014)

Marija Kohn (7 August 1934 – 16 July 2018) was a Croatian actress. She appeared in more than eighty films from 1957 to 2018.

== Selected filmography ==
Year	Title	Role	Notes
1958	H-8		
1978	Occupation in 26 Pictures		
1978	Bravo maestro		
2002	Winter in Rio		
2005	Sleep Sweet, My Darling		
2010	On the Path		
