= You Get It, Man =

1973 film by Vanča Kljaković

You Get It, Man (Kužiš stari moj) is a 1973 Croatian film directed by Vanča Kljaković, starring Ivica Vidović, Eva Ras and Relja Bašić. It is based on Zvonimir Majdak's novel of the same name.
