= A Shot =

A Shot (Pucanj) is a 1977 Croatian film directed by Krešo Golik, starring Božidar Orešković and Marko Nikolić.
