= The Four Seasons (1979 film) =

The Four Seasons (Godišnja doba Željke, Višnje i Branke) is a 1979 Yugoslavian Croatian language film directed by Petar Krelja.

The film was added to the Croatian State Archives.
