= Film Authors' Studio =

Film Authors' Studio (Croatian: Filmski autorski studio, FAS) was a short-lived but influential Croatian film production studio. Established in 1967, it was the first independent feature film production company in Yugoslavia.

== Sources ==
- Hajdler, Kruno. "FAS - Filmski autorski studio". kinotuskanac.hr (in Croatian). Croatian Film Association.
- "Filmski autorski studio (FAS)". hrfilm.hr (in Croatian). Croatian Film Association.
- Vojković, Saša (2006). "FACTUM: potraga za sadašnjim vremenom". Kolo (in Croatian) (3). Matica hrvatska.
- "Prvi i jedini film Ante Peterlića na DVD-u - Jutarnji.hr". jutarnji.hr. 17 September 2008. Archived from the original on 3 March 2016.
- Gilić, Nikica. "Zagrebačka slavistička škola - Modernizam i autorski film 1960-ih u Hrvatskoj". hrvatskiplus.org (in Croatian).
- "Krunoslav Heidler o Filmskom autorskom studiju". Glas Istre.
- "Kruno Heidlar – vitez podravske ravni". hfs.hr.
