= Crazy Days (film) =

1977 Croatian film

Crazy Days (Ludi dani) is a 1977 Croatian film directed and written by Nikola Babić, starring Zvonko Lepetić and Ilija Ivezić.

== Plot ==
In this tragicomedy about the pretensions and sorrows of Yugoslavs who go abroad to earn money, a number of foreign workers have come back home for the holidays. When one of them taunts another with having done poorly abroad, the other fellow claims that he has enough money from his jobs to paper the other fellow's ostentatious and expensive house.
