= Nebeski odred =

1961 film

- Directed by: Bosko Boskovic; Ilija Nikolic
- Written by: Djordje Lebovic
- Starring: Ljuba Tadic
- Cinematography: Stevo Radovic
- Release date: 1961
- Running time: 105 minutes
- Country: Yugoslavia
- Language: Serbian

Nebeski odred is a 1961 Yugoslav drama film directed by Bosko Boskovic and Ilija Nikolic. It was entered into the 2nd Moscow International Film Festival.

== Cast ==
- Ljuba Tadic
- Branko Tatic
- Ljubisa Stojcevic
- Vitomir Ljubicic
