= Carnival, Angel and Dust =

1990 film directed by Antun Vrdoljak

Carnival, Angel and Dust (Karneval, anđeo i prah) is a 1990 Croatian film directed by Antun Vrdoljak, starring Ivica Vidović and Boris Dvornik. It is based on the prose by Ranko Marinković.
