= Razmeđa =

Razmeđa is a Croatian film directed by Krešo Golik. It was released in 1973.
