= Igor Galo =

Serbian and Croatian actor (born 1948)

- Born: December 5, 1948 (age 77); Ćuprija, SR Serbia, SFR Yugoslavia
- Education: University of Zagreb
- Occupation: actor
- Years active: 1968-present

Igor Galo (born 5 December 1948) is Yugoslav and Croatian actor, best known for his work in Sam Peckinpah's Cross of Iron.

== Biography ==
He was born on 5 December 1948 in Ćuprija, SR Serbia, FPR Yugoslavia in Croatian family. His father was Yugoslav army officer. After moving around Yugoslavia his family settled in Pula where Galo completed gymnasium high school in 1967. He enrolled into the University of Zagreb forestry and economics studies but quickly dropped out when he started his acting career in 1968. Over the years he appeared in over 60 cinematic and TV roles out of which at least 22 were lead role. Beyond the former Yugoslavia he appeared as Lieutenant Meyer in 1977 Cross of Iron.

In 2017, Galo signed the Declaration on the Common Language of the Croats, Serbs, Bosniaks and Montenegrins.

== Filmography ==
- I Have Two Mothers and Two Fathers (1968)
- The Bridge (1969)
- Cross of Iron (1977)
- Operation Stadium (1977)
- Is It Clear, My Friend? (2000)
- Newenas weite Reise (2001)
- 476 A.D. Chapter One: The Last Light of Aries (2014)
- 476 AD (2016)
- 4:2 (2022)
- Sore: Istri dari Masa Depan (2025, Indonesian film)
