= Opasni put =

- Directed by: Mate Relja
- Written by: Anton Ingolič
- Starring: Marinko Cosic; Zlatko Kovacic; Zoran Relja
- Release date: 13 February 1963
- Running time: 1h 36m
- Country: Yugoslavia
- Language: Croatian

Opasni put is a 1963 Croatian film directed by Mate Relja. It is based on a novel by Anton Ingolič.
