= Ilija Ivezić =

Croatian actor

- Born: 20 July 1926; Ričice, Gračac, Kingdom of Serbs, Croats, and Slovenes
- Died: 14 April 2016 (aged 89); Zagreb, Croatia
- Other name: Elija Ivejić
- Occupation: Actor
- Years active: 1961–2016
- Awards: Order of Danica Hrvatska

Ilija Ivezić (20 July 1926 – 14 April 2016) was a Croatian film actor. He was born in Ričice, Gračac and died shortly before his 90th birthday. In a career that spanned more than five decades, Ivezić worked with directors such as Fadil Hadžić, Krsto Papić, Vatroslav Mimica, Antun Vrdoljak, Veljko Bulajić, and Antun Vrdoljak, among many others.

== Selected filmography ==
- Last of the Renegades (1964)
- Die Rechnung – eiskalt serviert (1966)
- Winnetou and Old Firehand (1966)
- The Bloody Vultures of Alaska (1973)
- A Performance of Hamlet in the Village of Mrdusa Donja (1974)
- The Golden Years (1993)
- Marshal Tito's Spirit (1999)
