= The Ninth Circle =

1960 Yugoslav film directed by France Štiglic

Deveti krug Девети круг
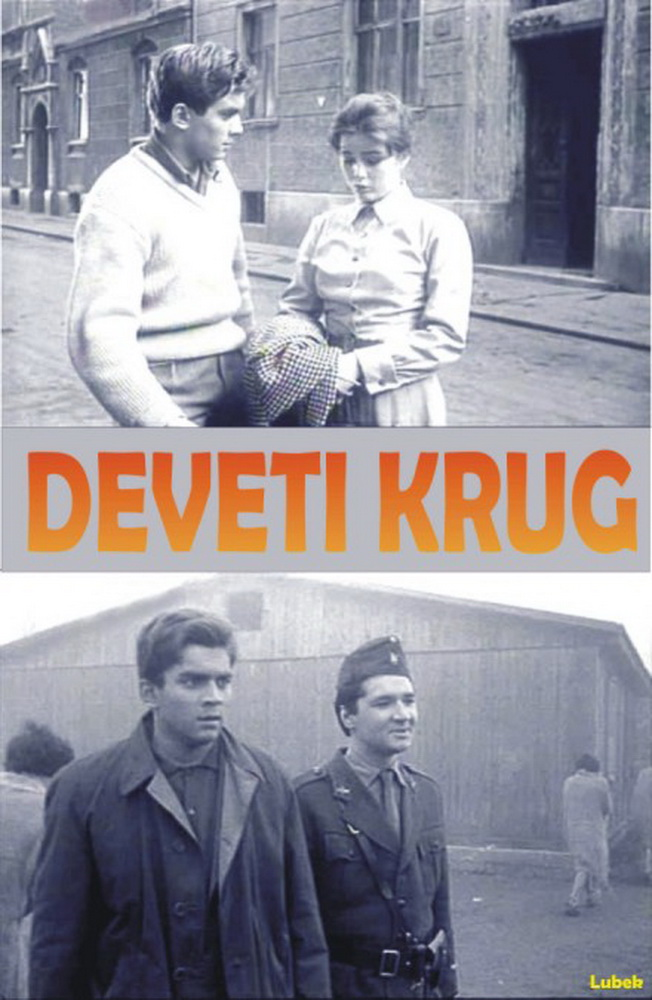
- Directed by: France Štiglic
- Written by: Vladimir Koch; France Štiglic; Zora Dirnbach (story)
- Starring: Boris Dvornik; Dušica Žegarac; Beba Lončar
- Cinematography: Ivan Marinček
- Edited by: Lida Braniš
- Music by: Branimir Sakač
- Release date: 21 April 1960
- Running time: 107 minutes
- Country: FPR Yugoslavia
- Language: Serbo-Croatian

The Ninth Circle (Serbo-Croatian: Deveti krug / Девети круг) is a 1960 Yugoslavian film directed by France Štiglic. The story revolves around the Croatian Ustaše concentration camp named The Ninth Circle, based on the infamous Jasenovac concentration camp. It was nominated for the Academy Award for Best Foreign Language Film. It was also entered into the 1960 Cannes Film Festival.

== Plot ==
In the early 1940s, following the German invasion of Yugoslavia and the establishment of the Ustaše-run Croatian Nazi puppet state, citizens of Zagreb face numerous hardships. The Jewish population, in particular, endures severe persecution and is targeted for extermination.

To rescue Ruth, a Jewish girl, from the clutches of the Nazis and their collaborators, a Croatian Catholic family orchestrates her marriage to their young son, Ivo. While Ivo understands the necessity of this arrangement, he is deeply saddened by the abrupt end to his carefree youth. Initially, he appears to harbor disdain for Ruth, dismissing her as "just a child," and continues to spend time with his close friend, Magda, with whom he also harbors romantic feelings. However, upon learning of Ivo's marriage, Magda distances herself from him. A drunken incident at Ivo's bachelor party strains their relationship further, leaving Ivo frustrated and causing an emotional outburst upon returning home. This prompts Ruth to flee into the night streets, where she almost exposes herself to a passing patrol before being rescued by Ivo's father.

Ivo comes to realize that his previous behavior is reckless, selfish, and dangerously ignorant of the gravity of the situation. Following this realization, he begins to form a closer emotional bond with Ruth, spending time with her and even taking her out to a park, despite the prohibition against Jews doing so. However, their situation worsens when a member of the Ustaše humiliates Ruth in public. The situation is diffused by Zvonko, one of Ivo's classmates who has joined the Ustaše, but he later bullies Ivo in class by marking his coat with a symbol representing "Židovi," the Croatian word for Jew. Witnessing this, Ruth is terrified, and Ivo tries to reassure her, marking several objects with the same symbol and referring to it as "just a letter." Additionally, he gives her a miniature park to compensate for her inability to visit the real one.

During a bomb alert, Ruth seizes a rare opportunity to venture out alone but is devastated when she discovers her father's name on a bulletin board, signifying his execution. Overwhelmed with grief, she breaks down in tears. As people return to the streets after the alert, an officer questions Ruth about her identity, leading to her arrest when she provides a false surname.

Unable to find Ruth, Ivo decides to sneak into the local concentration camp against his parents' pleas. After questioning inmates, he learns that Ruth may be held in the Ninth Circle, known as the "harem." As he approaches the camp's center, he encounters Zvonko, now a guard, who tries to portray camp life positively. They witness a group of children being loaded into a gas van, horrifying Ivo. Zvonko informs Ivo that the women in the Ninth Circle are scheduled for execution that night and suggests he "say goodbye" to Ruth. This prompts Ivo to confront Zvonko, potentially knocking him unconscious.

Inside the Ninth Circle, Ivo witnesses a grotesque scene as Ustaše officers cruelly dance with terrified women. Spotting Ruth, Ivo rescues her, and they hide in a guard tower, planning to escape during the rumored power outage at midnight. However, when the time comes, Ruth, still barefoot, cannot cross the fence. Despite having the chance to save himself, Ivo chooses to stay with her. The film concludes with a shot of a light being turned back on, suggesting the tragic fate of both Ruth and Ivo.

== Cast ==
- Boris Dvornik as Ivo Vojnović
- Dušica Žegarac as Ruth Alakalaj
- Dragan Milivojević as Zvonko
- Branko Tatić as Ivo's father
- Ervina Dragman as Ivo's mother
- Beba Lončar as Magda
- Vera Misita as Tetka

== Critical reception ==
The Ninth Circle received nominations for both the Palme d'Or at the Cannes Film Festival and an Academy Award in the category of Best Foreign Language Film.

The film was also released in more than 30 countries, including the U.S., the Soviet Union, France, Italy, Great Britain, Germany, Israel, Argentina, Australia, and Japan.

The Croatian Film Association's database describes The Ninth Circle as "the most beautiful and the most moving war melodrama of Croatian cinema". In 1999, a poll of Croatian film critics found it to be one of the best Croatian films ever made.

Contemporary commentator Jurica Pavičić calls The Ninth Circle "the most important Croatian film about the Holocaust", pointing out that it represents the first acknowledgement of the Jasenovac camp in all of Croatian cinema. However, he also calls the film "old-fashionedly expressive", noting that from a modern perspective, the viewing experience seems "archaic", especially in regards to aspects like shot composition and its inappropriately ostentatious soundtrack. The film's position as a landmark in Balkan cinema history remains undisputed.

== See also ==
- List of submissions to the 33rd Academy Awards for Best Foreign Language Film
- List of Yugoslav submissions for the Academy Award for Best Foreign Language Film
