= Zvonimir Berković =

Croatian film director and screenwriter

- Born: 1 August 1928; Belgrade, Kingdom of Serbs, Croats and Serbs
- Died: 9 June 2009 (aged 80); Zagreb, Croatia
- Occupations: Director, screenwriter
- Years active: 1956–1993
- Awards: Order of Danica Hrvatska

Zvonimir Berković (1 August 1928 – 9 June 2009) was a Croatian film director and screenwriter.

== Biography ==
Berković studied film directing at the Zagreb Academy of Drama Arts. His screenwriting career began in the mid-1950s, his most notable work being Nikola Tanhofer's 1958 film H-8, for which he co-authored the screenplay with Tomislav Butorac.

He had his directing debut with the 1962 documentary short My Flat (Moj stan), which offered an ironic portrayal of living standards in the socialist-style prefabricated housing projects. The film earned him a Special Jury Prize at the 1963 Cannes Film Festival. His feature directing debut was the 1966 film Rondo, which starred acclaimed Yugoslav actors Relja Bašić, Milena Dravić and Stevo Žigon, and which is today regarded as a classic of Yugoslav and Croatian cinema.

After Rondo, Berković directed a handful of films through the 1970s and 1980s and his only other notable work was the 1993 film Countess Dora (Kontesa Dora), which portrayed an episode in the life of 19th-century Croatian composer Dora Pejačević and which starred Alma Prica and Rade Šerbedžija. The film won the Big Golden Arena for Best Film at the 1993 Pula Film Festival.

In the 1990s Berković stopped making films and turned to teaching at the Zagreb Academy of Drama Arts, and was also a notable columnist writing music, theatre and film reviews for Globus, a popular current affairs weekly. He was also a longtime head of dramaturgy at the Zagreb-based film production company Jadran Film.

== Filmography ==
- Rondo (1966)
- The Scene of the Crash (Putovanje na mjesto nesreće, 1971)
- Love Letters with Intent (Ljubavna pisma s predumišljajem, 1985)
- Countess Dora (Kontesa Dora, 1993)
