= To Live on Love =

To Live on Love (Živjeti od ljubavi) is a 1973 Yugoslav Croatian film directed by Krešo Golik, starring Vlasta Knezović, Rade Šerbedžija and Boris Dvornik.

The film was selected for preservation by the Croatian State Archives.
