= Occupation in 26 Pictures =

1978 film

- Directed by: Lordan Zafranović
- Written by: Lordan Zafranović; Mirko Kovač
- Starring: Frano Lasić; Boris Kralj; Milan Štrljić; Stevo Žigon; Zvonimir Lepetić; Bert Sotlar; Boris Dvornik; Dušica Žegarac; Izet Hajdarhodžić; Antun Nalis; Zlatko Vranjican; Gordana Pavlov
- Cinematography: Karpo Ačimović Godina
- Edited by: Josip Remenar
- Music by: Alfi Kabiljo
- Production companies: Jadran film Croatia film
- Release date: 1978
- Running time: 116 minutes
- Country: Yugoslavia
- Language: Serbo-Croatian

Occupation in 26 Pictures (Serbo-Croatian: Okupacija u 26 slika; also distributed internationally as Occupation in 26 Tableaux) is a 1978 Yugoslav anti-war film directed by Lordan Zafranović. The film was selected as the Yugoslav entry for the Best Foreign Language Film at the 51st Academy Awards, but was not accepted as a nominee.

== Plot ==
The film is set in Dubrovnik, the last few days before the Second World War. The story revolves around three friends — Miho (a Jew), Niko (a Croat) and Toni (an Italian). They spend their days in each other's company - they're shown visiting a prostitute named Pina together, and later during practice at a fencing club. Toni is in a relationship with Niko's sister Ana, who intends to marry him. The engagement is interrupted by the noise of fighter jets and gunfire. Fascist and Nazi soldiers enter the city and occupy the entire area. Subsequently, Dubrovnik is annexed by the NDH and brought under a brutal dictatorship by the Ustashe, which divides the locals: Toni becomes a fascist, Miho is kicked out of his fencing club, while Niko and his father Baldo become anti-fascists and join the communist resistance.

At a fascist celebration, Niko turns a picture of Mussolini upside down. By that point, Toni is a staunch anti-communist. In one raid, the Ustashe round up a dozen dissidents, mostly Jews and one Orthodox priest who preached in Russian, and take them by bus out of the city into the wilderness, slaughtering them. The bus driver, a Croat, calls the fascists freaks, whereupon they kill him too. Miho's father is also killed on the bus, and Miho, while the Ustashe are distracted by the bloodbath, jumps off the bus. Ana gets pregnant and marries Toni. Baldo is arrested for publicly expressing his contempt for the fascist movement, and dies in an attempt to escape deportation to a concentration camp. Toni moves into Niko's house, claiming that it is now his. Toni is about to leave the house together with Miho, who is hiding at his place. The three of them sing the song Drugovi stari (Old friends) for the last time. In the middle of the song, Niko shoots Toni. Ana enters and is shocked by the sight. Niko and Miho pack up and leave, joining the partisan movement.

== Cast ==
- Frano Lasić as Niko
- Milan Štrljić as Toni
- Tanja Poberžnik as Ana
- Boris Kralj as Baldo
- Ivan Klemenc as Miho
- Gordana Pavlov as Mara
- Stevo Žigon as Hubička
- Bert Sotlar as Stijepo
- Marija Kohn as Luce
- Karlo Bulić as Paško
- Zvonko Lepetić as Gavran
- Milan Erak as Maraš
- Antun Nalis as Paolo
- Tanja Bošković as Pina
- Izet Hajdarhodžić as Dum Đivo

== Controversies ==
The film was a huge public success and the most viewed film of the year both in Yugoslavia and in Czechoslovakia. At the same time, it stirred controversy in Yugoslavia because of its non-ideological portrayal of the German and Italian occupation during World War II, and because of explicit violence and sexuality.

According to Zafranović, the film failed to secure an Academy Award nomination partly because of its graphic depiction of violence in a massacre scene set on a bus. Zafranović and screenwriter Mirko Kovač reportedly rejected a suggestion to shorten the scene from approximately seven minutes to three, fearing that doing so would compromise the film's artistic integrity. Producer Dan Tana later recalled that some Academy members had left screenings during the scene, which he believed had contributed to the film's failure to receive sufficient support for a nomination.

== Critique ==
Although generally praised, the film caused very mixed reactions from critics. Croatian film critic Nenad Polimac once called it trash, which is why he was blacklisted in the Croatian newsletter Polet (for a while he was neutralized as an associate, as they did not want to publish his articles and prevented him from appearing on radio and television).

Critic Damir Radić wrote for Filmski Leksikon:

"With a stylistically refined expression, Lordan Zafranović shapes his constant theme of individual and collective evil, focusing this time on the repression of Croatian and Italian fascists, staged in a naturalistic-grotesque key, with a climax in the famous sequence of the massacre in the bus. The grotesque-carnival approach is also evident in the treatment of sexuality, and is contrasted with the graceful physicality of the protagonist. The intriguingly announced elaboration of the characters and their relationships (especially the erotic triangle with incestuous implications of Niko - Anna - Toni, and the class-gender turn in the relationship between Niko - Mara) remains unfulfilled, and the ambitious attempt to portray a comprehensive social frescoes with patriotic citizens in the foreground (a thematic innovation in Yugoslav film at the time) only partially succeeded. Narrative-dramaturgically confused, stylistically and atmospherically impressive, the film caused great aesthetic-political controversies."

== Accolades ==
=== Awards ===
- Awards for Best Film, Best Director and Best Cinematography at the Pula Film Festival.
- Award for Episodic Role to Zvonko Lepetić; Award for Tanja Poberžnik for Debut Role; Diploma to Milan Štrljić and Petar Kralj at Niš 78.
- First prize for Best Screenplay at Vrnjačka Banja.

=== Nominations ===
- Nomination for the Palme d'Or in Cannes.

== See also ==
- List of submissions to the 51st Academy Awards for Best Foreign Language Film
- List of Yugoslav submissions for the Academy Award for Best Foreign Language Film
