= That's the Way the Cookie Crumbles =

1979 film

That's the Way the Cookie Crumbles (Živi bili pa vidjeli) is a Yugoslav film released in 1979, directed by Bruno Gamulin and Milivoj Puhlovski. Critical of the society of its time, it describes a young architecture student Janko Vizek (Mladen Vasary) who marries Martina, daughter of a company manager (Sanja Vejnović) and gets a job due to those connections. Having discovered corruption in the company, coupled with his idealist views, he comes in conflict with his father-in-law Branko (Boris Buzančić) and the rest of the establishment.

The film was noted for its innovative use of soundtrack, created by Slovenian band Buldožer. The band received the Golden Arena for Best Film Music award on the 1979 Pula Film Festival for the soundtrack.
