= Pero Kvrgić =

Croatian actor (1927–2020)

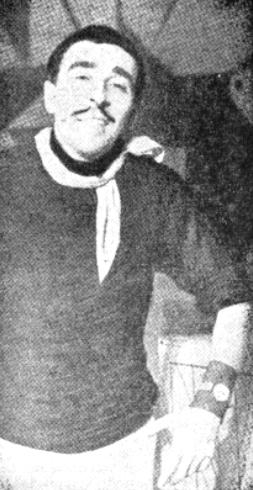
- Kvrgić c. 1956
- Born: 4 March 1927; Srpske Moravice, Kingdom of Serbs, Croats and Slovenes (today Moravice, Croatia)
- Died: 23 December 2020 (aged 93); Zagreb, Croatia
- Occupation: Actor
- Years active: 1956–2020
- Spouse: Nevenka Stipančić (until her death in 2019)
- Children: Ana Kvrgić

Pero Kvrgić (4 March 1927 – 23 December 2020) was a Croatian actor.

== Career ==
Kvrgić was born in Srpske Moravice to Serb father and Austrian mother. He trained as an actor in the schools of the Croatian National Theatre in Zagreb (HNK) after World War II.

He joined HNK in 1949, staying until he co-founded the Gavella Drama Theatre in 1953. He returned to HNK in 1986 before he retired in 1988. He continued to act post retirement. His long-standing play Stilske vježbe, a Croatian adaptation of Exercises in Style, is well known and has been produced since 1970, starring Kvrgić and Lela Margitić.
