= Boris Dvornik =

Croatian actor (1939 –2008)

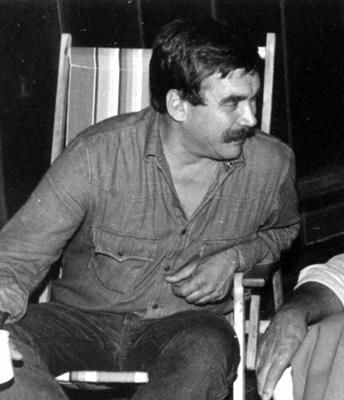
- Born: 16 April 1939; Split, Kingdom of Yugoslavia
- Died: 24 March 2008 (aged 68); Split, Croatia
- Education: Academy of Dramatic Art, University of Zagreb
- Occupation: Actor
- Years active: 1960–2008
- Political party: HDZ (1990s)
- Spouse: Diana Tomić (m. 1962)
- Children: 2, including Dino

Boris Dvornik (pronounced [bôːris dʋôːrnik]; 16 April 1939 – 24 March 2008) was a Croatian actor.

== Biography ==
Born in Split to the family of a carpenter, Dvornik discovered acting talent at an early age, while performing in children's plays. After studying to become an electrician, he began to pursue a full-time acting career. He studied at the National Acting School in Novi Sad and later enrolled at the Academy of Dramatic Art at the University of Zagreb.

As a freshman, he was cast in the starring role of the 1960 Holocaust drama The Ninth Circle. A year later, he showed his versatility by appearing in the popular comedy Martin in the Clouds. This established Dvornik as a big star of former Yugoslav cinema, comparable to Ljubiša Samardžić, Milena Dravić and Bata Živojinović; with latter he later developed a close friendship.

The zenith of Dvornik's popularity came in the 1970s with the role of Roko Prč in the cult series Naše malo misto. In the 1980s, after receiving acclaim as of one of the most renowned and prolific actors of the former Yugoslavia, Dvornik mostly worked with the Croatian National Theatre in his native city of Split.

Over the years Dvornik developed a close friendship with Antun Vrdoljak. He talked him into getting involved in politics and in the 1992 parliamentary election, Dvornik, as candidate of Croatian Democratic Union, was elected in the Split constituency. He soon realized that he had not the taste for politics and resigned his seat one month later. In more recent years, his career was affected by aftermath of a stroke and alcohol abuse, which manifested in a series of incidents, the most notorious being assault on a poll observer during the 2005 presidential election.

Dvornik had two sons, Dean and Dino, with his wife Diana Tomić, whom he married in 1962. Their younger son Dino died five and a half months after Boris.

Boris Dvornik suffered a stroke and died in Split on 24 March 2008. He was 68. He was buried three days later at Lovrinac Cemetery in his hometown.

== Selected filmography ==
- The Ninth Circle (1960) – Ivo Vojnović
- Martin in the Clouds (1961) – Martin Barić
- Medaljon sa tri srca (1962)
- Da li je umro dobar čovjek? (1962) – Miki
- Sjenka slave (1962) – Bazi
- Prekobrojna (1962) – Dane
- Double Circle (1963) – Krile
- Radopolje (1963) – Man without a nail
- Face to Face (1963) – Andrija Mackic
- Zemljaci (1963) – Nikola
- Lito vilovito (1964) – Ive
- Among Vultures (1964) – Fred
- Svanuce (1964) – Assistant chauffeur Stevo
- Man Is Not a Bird (1965) – Truckdriver
- Čovik od svita (1965) – Ive
- Konjuh planinom (1966) – Meso
- Winnetou and Old Firehand (1966) – Pater
- Kaja, ubit ću te! (1967)
- When You Hear the Bells (1969) – Kubura
- The Bridge (1969) – Zavatoni
- Događaj (1969) – Gamekeeper
- Battle of Neretva (1969) – Stipe
- Ljubav i poneka psovka (1969) – Mate Pivac
- Bablje ljeto (1970) – Captain
- Život je masovna pojava (1970) – Adio
- Družba Pere Kvržice (1970) – Jozo policeman
- The Pine Tree in the Mountain (1971) – Dikan
- Opklada (1971) – Truckdriver
- Lov na jelene (1972) – Barman Zeljo
- Traces of a Black Haired Girl (1972) – Jova
- To Live on Love (1973) – Medan
- The Battle of Sutjeska (1973) – Dalmatinac
- Derviš i smrt (1974) – Hasan Dželebdžija
- Crveni udar (1974) – Captain of aviation
- Hitler iz našeg sokaka (1975) – Marko
- Hajdučka vremena (1977) – Dane Desnica
- Letači velikog neba (1977) – Tomo
- Occupation in 26 Pictures (1978) – Vlaho
- Povratak (1979) – Barba Frane
- Vreme, vodi (1980) – Narednik Žika
- Cyclops (1982) – Major of the Yugoslav Army
- Servantes iz Malog Mista (1982) – Roko Prč
- Moj tata na određeno vreme (1982) – Bora
- Pismo - Glava (1983) – Bajo's brother
- The Secret of an Old Attic (1984) – Šime
- Horvatov izbor (1985)
- Od petka do petka (1985)
- Marjuča ili smrt (1987) – Ivanko
- Tempi di guerra (1987) – Bronco - Rebel Leader
- Tesna koža 2 (1987) – Vujo
- Bolji život (TV Series, 1987–1991) – Lujo Lukšić
- Špijun na štiklama (1988) – Bozur
- Karneval, anđeo i prah (1990) – Visko (segment "Karneval")
- Tajna starog mlina (1991)
- Nausikaya (1995)
- Transatlantic (1998)
- Kanjon opasnih igara (1998) – Frane
- The Last Will (2001) – Jure
- The Doctor of Craziness (2003) – Prolaznik
- Viza za budućnost (TV Series, 2003–2004) – Vinko Uskok
- Long Dark Night (2004) – Luka Kolar
- Ponos Ratkajevih (TV Series, 2008) – Branko Lorger (final role)
