= Vladimir Tadej =

Croatian production designer, screenwriter, and film director

- Born: 9 May 1925; Novska, Yugoslavia
- Died: 1 March 2017 (aged 91)
- Occupations: Production designer, screenwriter, film director
- Years active: 1949–1998
- Awards: Vladimir Nazor Award for Life Achievement in Film (2004)

Vladimir Tadej (9 May 1925 – 1 March 2017) was a Croatian production designer, screenwriter and film director. He contributed to more than forty films from 1949 to 1998.

== Biography ==
Tadej was born in Novska in 1925. In 1945 he enrolled into architecture studies University of Zagreb. His filmographic career was initiated when he was employed as scenography assistant at the Jadran Film in 1947 where he worked on Živjet će ovaj narod, first Croatian postwar movie. He worked as a main scenographer and costuming director at the Battle of Neretva movie, one of the most famous Yugoslav era war movies.

In 1998 he released Kanjon opasnih igara, based on Hrvoje Hitrec's novel of the same name. The cast includes Luka Peroš best known for his role of Marseille in Money Heist.

== Selected filmography ==
Year	Title	Role	Notes
1970	Družba Pere Kvržice		director
1977	Daredevil's Time		director
1984	Tajna starog tavana		director
1998	Kanjon opasnih igara		director
