= Franjo Majetić =

Croatian actor (1923–1991)

- Born: 26 February 1923; Zagreb, Kingdom of Serbs, Croats and Slovenes
- Died: 29 November 1991 (aged 68); Varaždin, Croatia
- Occupation: Actor
- Years active: 1970–1989

Franjo Majetić (26 February 1923 – 29 November 1991) was a Croatian actor noted for his comedic roles.

Although predominantly a stage actor, he is best remembered for his film debut - at age 47 - in the classic 1970 comedy One Song a Day Takes Mischief Away.

In November 2005 Majetić was ranked #10 in «Best Croatian Male Movie Stars of All Time» list by a Croatian-based monthly film magazine Hollywood.
