= The Pine Tree in the Mountain =

- Directed by: Antun Vrdoljak
- Written by: Antun Vrdoljak (based on the “War Diary” of Ivan Šibl)
- Based on: “Ratni dnevnik” by Ivan Šibl
- Starring: Boris Dvornik; Ivica Vidović
- Cinematography: Frano Vodopivec
- Edited by: Radojka Tanhofer
- Music by: Anđelko Klobučar
- Production company: Jadran film
- Release date: 1971
- Country: Yugoslavia
- Language: Croatian

The Pine Tree in the Mountain (U gori raste zelen bor) is a Croatian film directed by Antun Vrdoljak. Set during World War II the film follows the exploits of a detachment of partisans, concentrating on the personal and professional relationship between an urbane communist party commissar and the more rustic detachment commander. It was released in 1971.
