= Antun Vrdoljak =

Croatian film actor and director, sports official

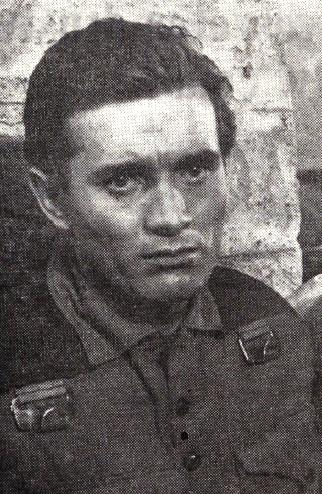
- Born: 5 June 1931 (age 94); Imotski, Kingdom of Yugoslavia (modern Croatia)
- Education: Academy of Dramatic Art
- Alma mater: University of Zagreb
- Occupations: Actor; film director; screenwriter; activist; politician
- Years active: 1956–present
- Spouse: Branka Vrdoljak (m. 1966)
- Children: 5
- Relatives: Goran Višnjić (son-in-law); Vanna (daughter-in-law)

President of the Croatian Olympic Committee
- In office 1991–2000
- Preceded by: Position established
- Succeeded by: Zdravko Hebel

Antun Vrdoljak (pronounced [ǎntuːn ʋr̩dǒʎaːk]; born 5 June 1931) is a Croatian film actor and director, sports official, and head of Croatian Radiotelevision during the Yugoslav Wars. Between the 1960s and early 1990s he was mainly a film artist. In the early 1990s he became involved in politics and became a prominent member of the Croatian Democratic Union (HDZ), which led to his appointment to a series of offices. He was director general of Croatian Radiotelevision (1991–1995), and president of the Croatian Olympic Committee (1991–2000).

== Life ==
Born in Imotski, Vrdoljak studied acting at the Zagreb Academy of Dramatic Art. His acting debut was in a 1957 film It Was Not in Vain by Nikola Tanhofer. In 1958, he appeared in Tanhofer's best known film H-8 to much critical acclaim. In the late 1960s, Vrdoljak gradually switched to film directing. Following the events of the Croatian Spring (1968–71), Vrdoljak became associated with Croatian nationalism. Authorities nevertheless allowed him to continue with his career. This included lavish adaptations of Croatian literary classics such as Cyclops (1982) and The Glembays (1988).

When first democratic elections were announced in Croatia, Vrdoljak was among 200 top intellectuals publicly endorsing the moderate Coalition of People's Accord. By the end of campaign, he switched his support for the more hardline Croatian Democratic Union (HDZ) and Franjo Tuđman, with whom he developed a close friendship. On 30 May 1990, the new democratically elected Parliament of Croatia convened and Franjo Tuđman was elected President of Croatia. Vrdoljak became one of country's six vice-presidents. As such, he was entrusted with the supervision of 1990 European Athletics Championships in Split.

== HRT ==
In December 1990, a new Croatian Constitution was adopted, ending the office of vice-president. A few months later, Vrdoljak was appointed to the post of general manager of Croatian Radiotelevision (HRTV), where he promoted Tuđman and the HDZ, working hard to prevent any criticism of government on the programme, while Croatian opposition parties were ignored. Vrdoljak garnered a degree of notoriety for saying television "must become a cathedral of the Croatian spirit".

On 16 September 1991, guards at the entrances of the HRT building told more than 300 employees that their passes were no longer valid. The move was attributed to "security reasons". Most of those on the security blacklists were Serbs or married to Serbs. Others may have had a relative in the Yugoslav Army or did not publicly support the HDZ.

In describing the role of both Croatian and Serbian national television in the awakening of ultranationalism, Slovenian journalist Sandra Bašić-Hrvatin reflects on the ways in which Croatian television projected itself as "the cathedral of the Croatian spirit" as promised by Vrdoljak:

Cultural populism is evident in the revival of undefined folk culture: music with extremely nationalistic lyrics and overwrought national sentiments, myths, old forgotten customs, publicity for religious practices... On Croatian television there is a whole list of programmes made for "the life of the nation": Good Morning Croatia, Croatia: Land and People, Greetings from the Homeland, Study Croatia, Croatian Language, Croatian Literature, Croatia in the World... On Serbian television, the most popular programmes are quiz games whose subject is national history, and programmes featuring popular folk music.

Ivan Parać, Vrdoljak's successor, charged him with corruption. To the opposition, Vrdoljak had been the embodiment of HDZ domination of the media. Although he maintained his seat in Parliament and other positions, he gradually retired from both politics and Tuđman's inner circle.

== Professional work ==
He began his career as an actor and was praised for his role in now classic 1958 film H-8, directed by Nikola Tanhofer. He received praise for his two early films as a director and screenwriter, Kad čuješ zvona (1969) and U gori raste zelen bor (1971). Both films were based on the diaries of Croatian Partisan leader Ivan Šibl. When You Hear the Bells was entered into the 6th Moscow International Film Festival, where it won a Silver Prize.

Vrdoljak worked on television, with his 1972 mini-series Prosjaci i sinovi, based on the script (and later the novel) by Ivan Raos, later receiving a cult status. The series was shown only in 1984, due to Raos' status as a "Croatian nationalist". Vrdoljak also garnered favorable attention for his adaptations of Kiklop (from the novel by Ranko Marinković, 1982) and The Glembays (from the play by Miroslav Krleža, 1988). Both films were broadcast in their longer TV versions. After securing funding from the new government, he directed Duga mračna noć, a mini-series about World War II in Slavonia.

After the HDZ lost power in 2000, Vrdoljak decided to return to film-making. He made news in 2006 due to a quarrel and physical altercation with fellow filmmaker, Lordan Zafranović.

In 2019, he directed a state-funded movie entitled General which depicts the life of Ante Gotovina, budgeted at 3 million euros. In the movie, Serbian soldiers are shown as drunk, lazy Chetnik criminals, while the Croatian soldiers are shown as a group respecting the customs of war. Balkan Insight described the movie as reinforcing war myths and of Vrdoljak as toeing the party line: "In Yugoslav times, the party line he followed was that of the ruling League of Communists, while now it is the ruling centre-right Croatian Democratic Union, HDZ, of which the director used to be a member." General was panned by critics and received largely negative ratings. The movie opened the 2019 Pula Film Festival but did not win any major awards, losing to The Diary of Diana B. In 2020 it was reported that a number of actors and crew members were not paid for their work on the film, which resulted in some of them filing a lawsuit.

== Awards ==
At the 1960 Pula Film Festival, the Yugoslav equivalent of Oscars, he won a Golden Arena for his role in Veljko Bulajić's nuclear holocaust film Atomic War Bride.

== Personal life ==
Vrdoljak was married twice. Divorced from his first wife, with whom he had one child, he remarried and has three other children. He is the father-in-law of actor Goran Višnjić who is married to Vrdoljak's daughter, Ivana, an artist known as Eva Višnjić/Eva Visnjic.

== Filmography ==
- The Road a Year Long (1958)
- Atomic War Bride (1960)
- Love and Some Swear Words (1969)
- When You Hear the Bells (1969)
- The Pine Tree in the Mountain (1971)
- Deps (1974)
- Snowstorm (1977)
- The Return (1979)
- Cyclops (1982)
- Od petka do petka (1985)
- The Glembays (1988)
- Karneval, anđeo i prah (1990)
- Long Dark Night (2004)
- General (2019)

Sporting positions
Preceded by Post established	President of the Croatian Olympic Committee; 1991–2000	Succeeded by Zdravko Hebel
