= Fadil Hadžić =

Croatian film director and playwright (1922–2011)

- Born: 23 April 1922; Bileća, Kingdom of Serbs, Croats and Slovenes
- Died: 3 January 2011 (aged 88); Zagreb, Croatia
- Occupations: Playwright, screenwriter, film director
- Spouse: Elizabeta Kukić
- Writing career
- Language: Serbo-Croatian
- Period: 1952–2008

Fadil Hadžić (23 April 1922 – 3 January 2011) was a Croatian and Yugoslav film director, screenwriter, playwright and journalist, mainly known for his comedy films and plays. He was born in Bileća in Bosnia and Herzegovina, but mainly lived and worked in Zagreb, with the Croatian and wider Yugoslav productions.

== Biography ==
Born in Bileća in Herzegovina, in what was then Yugoslavia, he went to study painting at the Academy of Fine Arts, University of Zagreb. He then worked on editing several popular magazines (Kerempuh, Vjesnik u srijedu, Telegram). He was also one of the founders of the prominent theatres Jazavac (today called Kerempuh) and Komedija in Zagreb, and also worked as the intendant at the Zagreb's Croatian National Theatre.

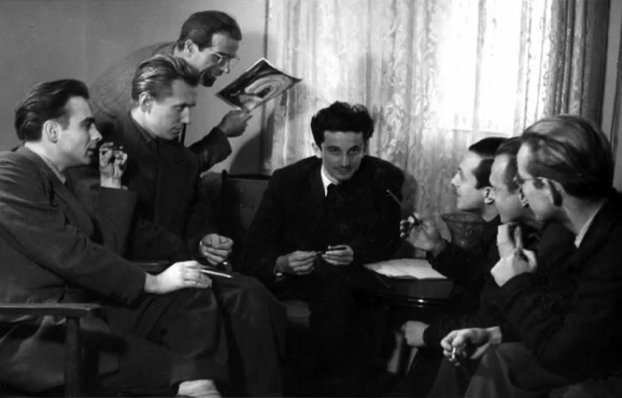
Fadil Hadžić (in centre) with his team for creating the Veliki miting, an animated film in 1949

He had his screenwriting debut in 1952 with the animated film The Haunted Castle at Dudinci (Croatian: Začarani dvorac u Dudincima), directed by Dušan Vukotić. In 1961, Hadžić had his directorial debut with Alphabet of Fear (Abeceda straha). He was a prolific and versatile filmmaker throughout the 1960s and his film Official Position (Službeni položaj) won the Big Golden Arena for Best Film at the 1964 Pula Film Festival. In the 1970s and 1980s his output was lower, but in spite of this he won the Golden Arena for Best Director for his 1979 film Journalist (Novinar).

Hadžić also wrote and directed the 1972 film, The Deer Hunt (Lov na jelene), starring Boris Dvornik and Silvana Armenulić, a subversive thriller-drama about an émigré suspected of Ustasha activity, which was timely and popular because of its relation to the Croatian Spring.

In the early 1980s, he effectively stopped making films, and turned to playwriting. In this period he wrote more than 57 popular plays and had 14 solo exhibitions of his paintings. In the early 2000s, he became active in film again, directing a couple of film adaptations of his comedy plays in 2003 and 2005, followed by the war drama Remember Vukovar (Zapamtite Vukovar) in 2008. He died in Zagreb.
