= Zvonko Lepetić =

Zvonimir "Zvonko" Lepetić (17 November 1928 – 4 January 1991) was one of the leading character actors of Croatian and Yugoslav cinema and television.

Lepetić was born in Berane, Montenegro. Since 1939, he lived in Sarajevo, where he graduated from gymnasium and was later enrolled at the Drama Studio (Dramski studio). In 1953 he joined the Sarajevo National Theatre. After short acting stints in Buje, Šibenik and Zadar, in 1963 Lepetić joined the Croatian National Theatre in Split, where he stayed until 1968 and his move to Zagreb.

Lepetić's earliest film role was in Fadil Hadžić's Konjuh planinom (1966), but his first prominent film performances were in The Pine Tree in the Mountain (1971) and A Performance of Hamlet in the Village of Mrdusa Donja (1973). In his career, Lepetić had more than 60 film and television credits.

== Selected filmography ==
- The Pine Tree in the Mountain (1971)
- A Performance of Hamlet in the Village of Mrdusa Donja (1973)
- Crazy Days (1977)
- Occupation in 26 Pictures (1978)
- High Voltage (1981)
- Great Transport (1983)
- Balkan Spy (1984)

=== Television ===
- Prosjaci i sinovi (1972) - Copac
- Kapelski kresovi (1975–1976) - Ekonom
- Jelenko (1981) - Barisa
