= List of Croatian films of the 1980s =

This is a list of the feature films produced in Croatia between 1980 and 1989.

For an alphabetical list of articles on Croatian films see Category:Croatian films.

English title	Croatian title	Director(s)	Company	Main cast	Notes
1980
The Secret of Nikola Tesla	Tajna Nikole Tesle	Krsto Papić			
	Luda kuća	Ljubiša Ristić	Jadran		
Lost Homeland	Izgubljeni zavičaj	Ante Babaja	Jadran		
1981
	Banović Strahinja	Vatroslav Mimica			
Visitors from the Galaxy	Gosti iz galaksije	Dušan Vukotić			
The Fall of Italy	Pad Italije	Lordan Zafranović			
	Ritam zločina	Zoran Tadić			
The Melody Haunts My Memory	Samo jednom se ljubi	Rajko Grlić	Jadran		
	Snađi se druže	Berislav Makarović			
High Voltage	Visoki napon	Veljko Bulajić	Croatia		
Southbound Train	Vlakom prema jugu	Petar Krelja			
1982
	Servantes iz Malog Mista	Daniel Marušić			
	Hoću živjeti	Miroslav Mikuljan	Jadran		
	Zločin u školi	Branko Ivanda	Adria		
	Kiklop	Antun Vrdoljak			
	Nemir	Ahmed Imamović			
1983
	Medeni mjesec	Nikola Babić			
The Third Key	Treći ključ	Zoran Tadić			
	S.P.U.K. (sreća pojedinca - uspjeh kolektiva)	Milivoj Puhlovski			
1984
The Ambassador	Ambasador	Fadil Hadžić			
	Mala pljačka vlaka	Dejan Šorak			
Early Snow in Munich	Rani snijeg u Münchenu	Bogdan Žižić			
Angel's Bite	Ujed anđela	Lordan Zafranović			
In the Jaws of Life	U raljama života	Rajko Grlić			
	Zadarski memento	Joakim Marušić			
	Tajna starog tavana	Vladimir Tadej			
1985
	Horvatov izbor	Eduard Galić			
	Od petka do petka	Antun Vrdoljak			
	Crveni i crni	Miroslav Mikuljan			
	Anticasanova	Vladimir Tadej			
Love Letters with Intent	Ljubavna pisma s predumišljajem	Zvonimir Berković			
	Na istarski način	Vladimir Fulgosi			
	Kuća na pijesku	Ivan Martinac			
Three for Happiness	Za sreću je potrebno troje	Rajko Grlić			
1986
	Obećana zemlja	Veljko Bulajić			
	Večernja zvona	Lordan Zafranović			
	San o ruži	Zoran Tadić			
1987
	Kraljeva završnica	Živorad Tomić			
Officer with a Rose	Oficir s ružom	Dejan Šorak			
	Marjuča ili smrt	Vanča Kljaković			
1988
	U sredini mojih dana	Jakov Sedlar			
Sokol Did Not Love Him	Sokol ga nije volio	Branko Schmidt			
The Orchid Villa	Vila orhideja	Krešo Golik			
My Uncle's Legacy	Život sa stricem	Krsto Papić			
The Glembays	Glembajevi	Antun Vrdoljak			
Aloa: Festivity of the Whores	Haloa - praznik kurvi	Lordan Zafranović			
1989
A Man Who Liked Funerals	Čovjek koji je volio sprovode	Zoran Tadić			
	Povratak Katarine Kožul	Slobodan Praljak			
	Donator	Veljko Bulajić			
That Summer of White Roses	Đavolji raj	Rajko Grlić			
	Krvopijci	Dejan Šorak			
	Diploma za smrt	Živorad Tomić			
	Hamburg Altona				
