= The Third Key =

1983 film by Zoran Tadić

- Croatian: Treći ključ
- Directed by: Zoran Tadić
- Screenplay by: Pavao Pavličić
- Cinematography: Goran Trbuljak
- Edited by: Višnja Štefić
- Music by: Aleksandar Bubanović
- Production companies: Radiotelevision Zagreb; Centar Film
- Release date: 28 March 1983 (Yugoslavia)
- Running time: 88 minutes
- Country: Yugoslavia

for the 1956 Ealing Studios film directed by Charles Frend, see The Long Arm (film).

The Third Key (Treći ključ) is a 1983 Croatian film directed by Zoran Tadić, starring Božidar Alić and Vedrana Međimorec. A Kafkian horror film, indirectly touching on the topic of corruption, in showing the alienation and soullessness of modern agglomerations it resembles somewhat the film Someone's Watching Me! by John Carpenter.

== Plot ==
Dunja and Zvonko are a young married couple who are moving into a newly built apartment in Novi Zagreb. Their relationship is burdened by a number of personal issues, such as Dunja being older than Zvonko and having other lovers before him, and Zvonko being prone to alcohol abuse. As Dunja is unemployed and Zvonko has old gambling debts, they are chronically struggling for money and their trust in each other seems to have been eroded. Although it transpires that the apartment was not acquired in an entirely legal way, the two are hopeful about a new start.

After moving in, Dunja and Zvonko soon begin noticing suspicious strangers in the vicinity, and mysterious envelopes with substantial amounts of cash start to appear in their mailbox. Since the envelopes are addressed to them, they decide to spend the money, although they are unable to identify the sender. Soon after that, they discover signs of an apparent intrusion, as if someone has the third key – the one they were supposed to receive with the apartment but never did – and is using it to enter their home while they're away.

The couple are unsettled over the events and are struggling to explain them, eventually asking friends and then the police for help, but to no avail. Dunja is convinced from the outset that there must be a connection between the intrusions and the money, while Zvonko is dismissive towards that idea, lulled by the unexpected financial gain.

Over time, the couple's relationship becomes increasingly strained by uncertainty and fear, leading to mutual accusations and verbal fights. They leave the apartment for a motel, only to receive the same envelope at the reception. Finally, they swap the apartment with a friend, but the envelopes keep arriving at their new address...

== Cast ==
- Božidar Alić as Zvonko Kršlak
- Vedrana Međimorec as Dunja Kršlak
- Franjo Majetić as uncle
- Ivo Gregurević as Marko
- Đorđe Rapajić as Jura
- Tomislav Gotovac as street performer

== Background and production ==
Božidar Alić got the role of Zvonko after Tadić noticed him in "72–96", an episode of drama TV series Nepokoreni grad directed by Tadić in 1981.

The role of Dunja was initially meant for Božidarka Frajt, but went in the end to then little-known Vedrana Međimorec because Frajt either waited too long with her acceptance or – according to another source – cancelled at the last moment.

The production of The Third Key was twice as expensive as that of Tadić's debut, Rhythm of a Crime, but was still very modest. Standard 16 mm color film was used, later transferred to 35 mm. Two thirds of the footage were shot in the same indoor location, with very simple sets. Most scenes feature only the two main protagonists, and episodic roles were played by director's friends. Apart from the opening and closing credits, there is no music in the film.

Alić's behavior during the shooting made Tadić vow never to work with him again. Apparently, as soon as Alić sensed his partner did well, he deliberately fumbled his lines so as to ruin the shot. This ultimately cost him the lead role in Love Letters with Intent (1985), as Zvonimir Berković – upon hearing from the crew of The Third Key that Alić was impossible to work with – passed him over in favor of Zlatko Vitez.

== Themes and analysis ==
Croatian film critic Tomislav Čegir argued that the motif of internal disarray, apparent in The Third Key, is also present in other Tadić's films, such as Dreaming the Rose (1986) and Osuđeni (1987). The protagonists "become insignificant individuals due to societal, economic, as well as political determinants, which entails their position of alienation, marginalization, or even apostasy". In Čegir's view, these themes also hinted at the actual reality of disarray which was corroding the Yugoslav society in the 1980s, eventually leading to the breakup of the country. Jurica Pavičić too saw Tadić's 1980s films as a "moral chronicle of an era", where the heroes are "people who have used their connections to get a [state-owned] apartment, who have given or taken a bribe, gotten ahead at other people's expense, in short – socialist citizenry which 'does what others do too', until a metaphysical punishment catches up with them".

The powerlessness of the individual is deepened by their failure to connect to people around them. In The Third Key, the absence of trust destabilizes the marriage and makes it vulnerable to outside influences. In other Tadić's films, the protagonists also tend to be divided by mistrust, opportunism, or inability to establish deeper personal relationships. Yet Tadić is partial to his characters, who tend to experience their seemingly inescapable predicament with stoic pessimism.

The Third Key and Tadić's other films also share the themes of the inevitability of fate, as well as the question of justice. The two protagonists attempt to find a new way of living in order to extract themselves from their background, but the metaphorical inevitability of fate prevents them from doing so, and by the time they realize they are unable to change it, it is already too late.

== Reception and legacy ==
While The Third Key is generally considered to fall short of the high standard set by Rhythm of a Crime, it is nevertheless deemed interesting for its genre approach and topic which were novel in Croatian and Yugoslav cinema of the era.

Croatian film critic Jurica Pavičić named The Third Key his personal favorite among five films shot by Tadić in the 1980s after his debut.

In 2007, Croatian film critic Nenad Polimac listed The Third Key in his selection of "lost classics" of Croatian cinema.

== Bibliography ==
- Čegir, Tomislav (October 2005). "Filmsko stvaralaštvo Zorana Tadića" [Zoran Tadić's film oeuvre] (PDF). Hrvatski filmski ljetopis (in Croatian). 11 (43). Zagreb: Croatian Film Association: 3–10.
