= Ena Begović =

Croatian actress (1960–2000)

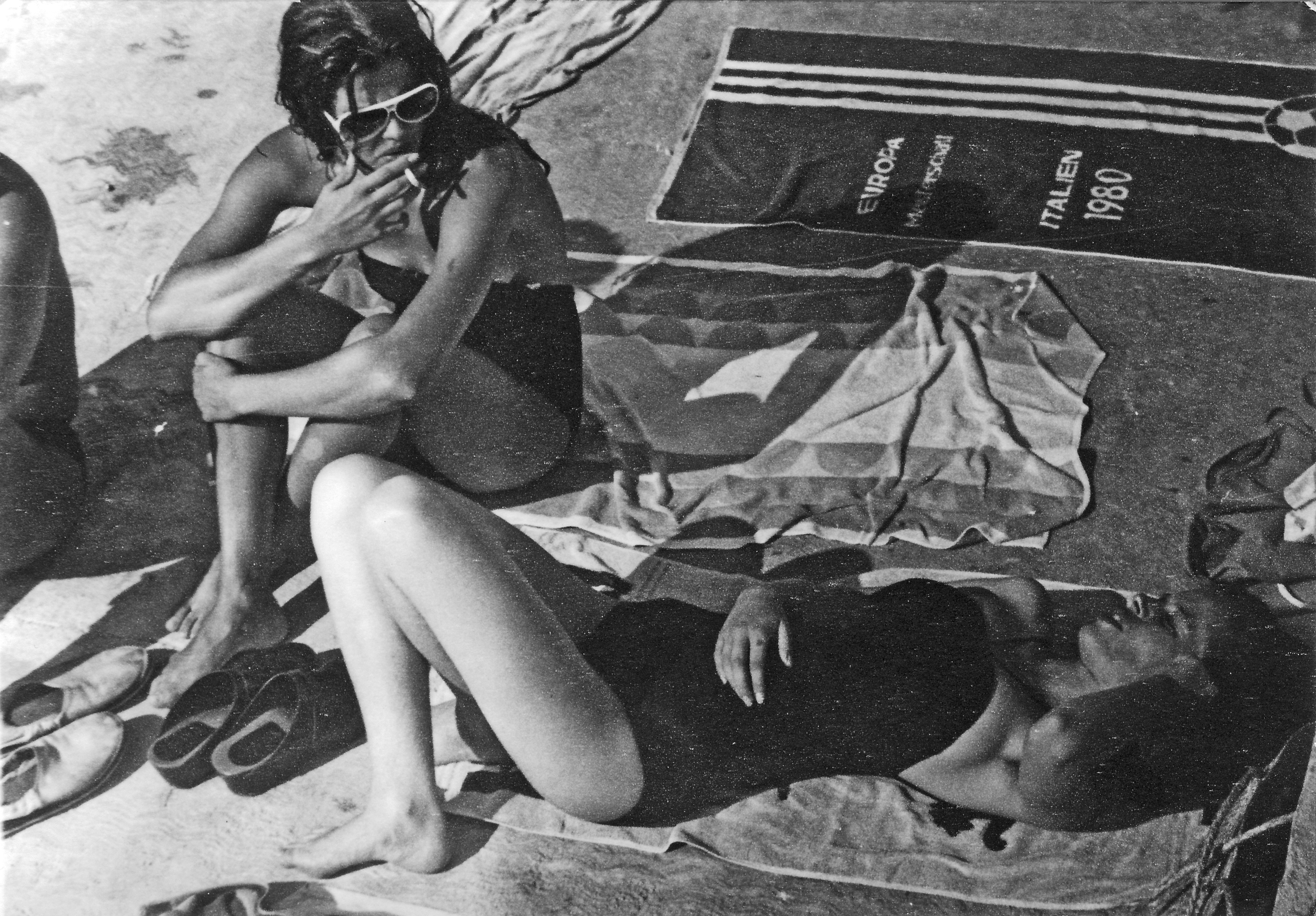
- Ena and her sister Mia Begović, Pula, early 1980s
- Born: 8 July 1960; Split or Trpanj, PR Croatia, Yugoslavia
- Died: 15 August 2000 (aged 40); Postira, Croatia
- Years active: 1978–2000
- Spouse: Josip Radeljak (m. 2000)
- Children: 1
- Relatives: Mia Begović (sister)
- Awards: Order of Danica Hrvatska

Ena Begović (8 July 1960 – 15 August 2000) was a Croatian film actress. She is regarded as one of the best and most beautiful actresses in former Yugoslavia.

== Early life and career ==
Begović was the older daughter of Terezija and Nikola Begović. She was born either in Trpanj or in Split. Three years later, in January 1963, her sister Mia, who is also an actress, was born. Her father was originally from the municipality of Trpanj, on the Pelješac peninsula.

Begović began acting early, making her first screen appearance at the age of 18 through a small part in Occupation in 26 Pictures, a 1978 film directed by Lordan Zafranović. She made her breakthrough role in Zafranović's next film, The Fall of Italy (1981), where she played Veronika, the daughter of a wealthy local from the Dalmatian coast who sided with the occupying Italian Fascists. This debut established Begović as one of the sex symbols of 1980s Yugoslav cinema, a status that she later successfully maintained despite appearing in relatively few films as her acting career shifted toward theater.

In the 1990s, the public focused more of its attention on her personal life than on her acting. In 1996, while driving her car in Zagreb, she was involved in a traffic accident resulting in the death of a motorcyclist.

== Death ==
On 15 August 2000, in the village of Splitska on the island of Brač, a few months after marrying the Croatian businessman Josip Radeljak Dikan, and a month and a half after giving birth to their daughter, Lana, she was involved as a passenger in a traffic accident, a rollover, which claimed her life. She was buried at Mirogoj Cemetery in Zagreb, on 19 August.

== Filmography ==
Year	Title	Role	Notes
1978	Occupation in 26 Pictures	Skojevka	Uncredited
1980	A Mess in the House	Maja Benic	
1981	The Fall of Italy	Veronika	
1981	Piknik u Topoli	Jelena	
1982	Idemo dalje	Milica	
1982	I Want to Live	Tereza Peric	
1987	King's Endgame	Visnja Kralj	
1988	The Glembays	Barunica Castelli	
1989	Balkan ekspres 2	Danka	
1990	Carnival, Angel and Dust	Frida	(segment "Andjeo")
1990	Fatal Sky	Mrs. Sumner	
1991	Charuga	Svilena	
1997	The Third Woman	Hela Martinic	
1998	The Three Men of Melita Žganjer	Maria	
1998	Agonija	Laura Lenbach	
1999	Četverored	Mirta Mesog	(final film role)
