= Brešan =

Brešan is a surname. Notable people with the surname include:

- Ivo Brešan (born 1936), Croatian playwright, novelist, and screenwriter
- Vinko Brešan (born 1964), Croatian film director and son of Ivo Brešan
- Andrea Bresciani (1923–2006), comics artist and illustrator whose birth name was Dušan Brešan
