= Božidarka Frajt =

Croatian actress (born 1940)

- Born: Božidarka Grublješić; 11 November 1940 (age 85); Velika Žuljevica, Vrbas Banovina, Kingdom of Yugoslavia
- Other name: Božidarka Frait
- Occupation: Actress
- Years active: 1959–present
- Spouse: Boris Gregorić
- Children: Bojana Gregorić
- Awards: Golden Arena for Best Actress (1972); Vladimir Nazor Award (2010)

Božidarka Frajt (also spelled Frait; née Grublješić; born 11 November 1940) is a Croatian actress.

In her six decade long career, she has composed a prolific repertoire in Croatian television, film and theatre, but is best known for her role in cinéma vérité-style 1972 film The Living Truth, which earned her critical praise and a Golden Arena Award for Best Actress. In 2010, Frajt was awarded the Vladimir Nazor Award for lifetime achievement.

== Early life ==
Božidarka Frajt was born Božidarka Grublješić on 11 November 1940. Born to an ethnic Serb family from Bosnia, her exact birthplace is unknown due to the scarce information of her childhood. It is believed she was born in Velika Žuljevica under Kozara, and that she was taken by the Ustashas to the Sisak concentration camp during the Kozara Offensive in 1942 along with thousands of other orphans. She was later adopted by Croatian Jews Katarina and Stjepan Frajt. At the age of 36, she found out about her Kozara heritage when a woman named Dara Grublješić identified her as her niece.

== Career ==
Frajt made her acting debut in the 1959 Croatian-language film Lakat kao takav, directed by Ante Babaja. In 1963, Frajt interpreted the complex character Vera in the Yugoslav political film Licem u lice. The film directed by Branko Bauer gained critical acclaim, winning a Big Golden Arena Award for Best Film at the Pula Film Festival and critical praise.

Her debut as a television actress came with the 1969 Sumorna Jesen, as "The Good Fairy". The plot lines of most of the episodes Frajt starred in were inspired by the experiences of screenwriter Ivan Šibl in World War II.

In 1972, Frajt starred in the directorial debut film of Tomislav Radić The Living Truth. Her dynamic and dominant interpretation in the drama provided a direct dichotomy to the depressing nature of the film. Her performance instantly made her one of the most prominent film actresses of Yugoslavia, winning her a Golden Arena for Best Actress and commercial success. In a 1999 poll among 44 Croatian film consumers, The Living Truth was placed 20th on the list of all-time best Croatian films.

Frajt had a major role in the 1977 Krešo Golik film Pucanj, sharing the protagonist role with Serbian actor Marko Nikolić. In 1978, she appeared as the middle-aged audio pedagogue protagonist Ljubica in another Golik production Ljubica.

In 1981, Veljko Bulajić invited her to play the principal character in the film High Voltage, after her performance as Ljubica.

In 1997, she voiced Grga (Melvin)'s mother in the Croatian-language animated feature Lapitch the Little Shoemaker. Frajt also dubbed Kala in the official 2005 Croatian version of the 1999 animated film Tarzan, and in 2013, Helen Mirren's character Dean Abigail Hardscrabble in the Croatian dub of Monsters University.

For her services to Yugoslav film, she was awarded the Vladimir Nazor Award in 2010.

== Personal life ==
Frajt was married to Croatian producer Boris Gregorić, with whom she had one child, Bojana, who is a prominent Croatian actress. Frajt currently lives in Zagreb.

== Selected filmography ==
=== Television ===
Year	Title	Role	Notes
1969	Sumorna jesen	Good Fairy	
1969	Pod novim krovovima	Vedrana	
1977	Alpensaga	Alpina	Co-written
1978	Mačak pod šljemom	Janja	
1979	Svjetionik	Iva's mother	
1988	Zagubljen govor	Danka	
1988	Dirty Dozen	Citizen	
2006	Odmori se, zaslužio si	Berta	
2009	Zakon!	Bruna	Cameo role
2009	Stipe u gostima	Cvita	

=== Film ===
Year	Title	Role	Notes
1959	Lakat kao takav	Gordana	
1960	Bolje je umeti	The Daughter	
1963	Licem u lice	Vera	
1965	Danovi na iskusnije	Baba Milka	
1967	Protest	Ivanka	Main role
1970	Pucanj	Savka	Main role
1970	Rosolino Paternò, soldato...	Giatta	Italian-language film
1970	Ana i Eva	Walter's mistress	
1972	The Living Truth	Herself	Main role Golden Arena for Best Actress in 1972
1972	Kipic	Ivana	Main role
1974	Užička republika	Nada	
1975	Žena sa krajolikom		
1975	Muke po Mati	Mare	
1976	Kuhinja	Monika	Main role
1976	Izdaja	Josipa	
1976	Vagon li	Vera	
1977	I tako dalje	Branka	
1977	Pucanj	Savka	Main role
1978	Ljubica	Ljubica	Main role
1979	Todora	Todora	Main role
1981	Ritam zločina	Zdenka	Main role
1981	High Voltage	Sonja	
1989	A Man Who Liked Funerals	Zdenka	
1995	Isprani	Mother	
1997	Russian meat	Ida's mother	
1997	Lapitch the Little Shoemaker	Melvin's mother	Voice role
1997	The Third Woman	Ivanka	
1998	The Three Men of Melita Žganjer	Neighbour	Cameo
1999	Red Dust	Jasna	
1999	Četverored		
2000	Celestial Body	Woman in line	Cameo
2003	Here		
2004	Accidental Co-Traveller	Greta's mother	
2005	Tarzan	Kala	Croatian dub
2011	Josef	Julija	
2011	Duh babe Ilonke	Anka	
2013	Monsters University	Dean Abigail Hardscrabble	Croatian dub
