= Žarko Potočnjak =

Croatian actor (1946–2021)

- Born: 3 February 1946; Pakrac, PR Croatia, FPR Yugoslavia
- Died: 21 October 2021 (aged 75); Zagreb, Croatia
- Occupation: Actor
- Years active: 1966–2021

Žarko Potočnjak (3 February 1946 – 21 October 2021) was a Croatian theatre, television and film actor.

Potočnjak graduated from the Zagreb Academy of Dramatic Art in 1972. Upon graduation he was hired as a regular member at the Komedija and Gavella theatres in Zagreb, and since 1994 he has been a member of cast at the Croatian National Theatre in Zagreb.

Apart from his work in theatre, Potočnjak has appeared in about 30 television series and a number of film productions since the 1970s.

In 1983, he married actress Asja Jovanović, with whom he has a daughter Mirna. During the Croatian War of Independence he served with the 106th Croatian Army brigade based in Osijek.

He provided the voice of Mater in the Croatian dub of the Cars franchise and Raisin and dalmatian in Marmaduke.

== Selected filmography ==
- The Rat Savior (Izbavitelj, 1976)
- Visitors from the Galaxy (Gosti iz galaksije, 1981)
- Evening Bells (Večernja zvona, 1986)
- The Glembays (Glembajevi, 1988)
- Go, Yellow (Ajmo žuti, 2001)
- Long Dark Night (Duga mračna noć, 2004)
- Sleep Sweet, My Darling (Snivaj, zlato moje, 2005)
- Libertas (2006)
- Nad lipom 35 TV, (2006-20??)
- Play Me a Love Song (Pjevajte nešto ljubavno, 2007)
- Will Not End Here (Nije kraj, 2008)
