= Marina Nemet =

Croatian actress

- Born: 7 June 1960; Nova Gradiška, PR Croatia, FPR Yugoslavia
- Died: 11 December 2010 (aged 50); Zagreb, Croatia
- Education: Academy of Dramatic Art
- Alma mater: University of Zagreb
- Occupation: Actress
- Years active: 1969–2010
- Spouse: Slavko Brankov (m. 1984–2004)
- Children: Tena Nemet Brankov

Marina Nemet (7 June 1960 – 11 December 2010) was a Croatian film, theatre and television actress.

== Biography ==
Nemet was married to actor Slavko Brankov between 1984 and 2004, with whom she had a daughter Tena, who is also an actress (b. 1994).

Nemet died on 11 December 2010 after a short but severe battle with brain tumor. She was diagnosed with the disease in April 2010, after having severe headache, accompanied by general weakness, nausea and strong flashes before her eyes. She last appeared in public on Sunday, 5 December at the Gavella Drama Theatre, on performance of Moliere's Tartuffe: revenue performance, which played on weekends, colleagues they intend for her treatment. She was buried in the Miroševac Cemetery.

== Filmography ==
=== Film ===
- Sleep Sweet, My Darling as Slava Štingl (2005)
- 100 Minutes of Glory as Miranda (2004)
- Mišolovka Walta Disneya (2003)
- Go, Yellow as Matilda (2001)
- Lapitch the Little Shoemaker as master (voice) (1997)
- Svila Skare as sister (1987)
- Angel's Bite as girl (1984)
- Southbound Train as Marina Ban (1981)
- Godišnje doba Željke, Višnje i Branke (1979)
- Probni rok (1979)
- Tomo Bakran as Bakranova djevojka (1978)
- Beliot sid (1978)
- The Last Mission of Demolitions Man Cloud (1978)
- Ljubavni život Budimira Trajkovića as Mirjana (1977)
- Giovanni as Tina (1976)
- Little Mother (1973)
- Družba Pere Kvržice as Marija (1970)
- An Event as Lugar's daughter (1969)

=== Television ===
- Mamutica kao Maja (2008)
- Bibin svijet as Cicvarić (2007)
- Zabranjena ljubav as Marija Carević (2004–2006)
- Naši i vaši as professor (2002)
- Putovanje u Vučjak (1986)
- Anno Domini 1573 as Regica (1979)
- Čast mi je pozvati vas as Marina (1977)
