= Tena Nemet Brankov =

Croatian actress

- Born: 4 January 1994 (age 32); Zagreb, Croatia
- Education: Academy of Dramatic Art, University of Zagreb
- Occupation: Actress
- Years active: 2007–present

Tena Nemet Brankov (born 4 January 1994) is a Croatian actress.

== Biography ==
Brankov was born on 4 January 1994 in Zagreb. She only daughter of actors Slavko Brankov and Marina Nemet.

She had to move out of the family home in 2012 to the 55-square-meter apartment that was given to her parents for use. After graduating from Tituš Brezovacki High School in Zagreb, she graduated from the Academy of Dramatic Art in 2017.

Brankov made her film debut The Trampoline, for which she won the Golden Arena for Best Supporting Actress at the Pula Film Festival in 2016, and her first theater role in the drama "Fine mrtve đjevje" at the end of 2014.

== Filmography ==
=== Film ===
- General as Jelica (2019)
- Trampolin as Nika (2016)
- Djevojke as Tena (2016; short film)
- Ljubav ili smrt as Lotte (2014)

=== Television ===
- Kumovi as Valentina (2022)
- Šutnja as Goga (2021)
- General as Jelica (2019)
- Ko te šiša as mlada Marie (2017)
- Počivali u miru kao Buga Koretić (2017)
- Novine as Lara Tomašević (2016–2020)
- Crno-bijeli svijet as Selma (2016)
- Nemoj nikome reći as Iva Tarle (2015–2017)
- Operacija Kajman as Sanja (2007)

=== Stage ===
- Ugly Dolls as Tuesday (2019)
- Hugo i lovci na duhove as Lola Thompson (2016)

=== Radio ===
- "Jesenja lica" (2019)
