= Kud puklo da puklo =

Kud puklo da puklo may refer to:

- Kud puklo da puklo (film), 1974 Croatian film also known as Whichever Way the Ball Bounces
- Kud puklo da puklo (TV series), Croatian comedy telenovela first aired in 2014
