= Murder on the Night Train =

- title card
- Written by: Mirko Kovač
- Directed by: Lordan Zafranović
- Starring: Slobodan Perović; Dragan Nikolić
- Music by: Zoran Hristić
- Country of origin: Yugoslavia
- Original language: Serbo-Croatian

Production
- Producer: Aleksandar Petrović
- Cinematography: Predrag Popović
- Editor: Branka Čeperac
- Running time: 47 min
- Production company: RTV Beograd

Original release
- Release: 1972

Murder on the Night Train (Serbo-Croatian: Ubistvo u noćnom vozu) is a 1972 Yugoslav television film directed by Lordan Zafranović and written by Mirko Kovač.

The film is part of Zafranović's unfinished "Seven Deadly Sins" cycle.

== Synopsis ==
This is a story about two lonely men, one young and another middle-aged, who travel together by train one night. Their relationship on the journey varies from parental tenderness to destructive hatred.

== Cast ==
- Slobodan Perović as traveller 1
- Dragan Nikolić as traveller 2
