= Živko Zalar =

Croatian cinematographer

- Born: 24 April 1948 (age 78); Zagreb, Yugoslavia (present-day Croatia)
- Occupation: Cinematographer
- Years active: 1974–present

Živko Zalar (born 24 April 1948 in Zagreb) is a Croatian cinematographer, son of Croatian cinematographer Slavko Zalar.

Zalar began making films as an amateur at the Kino Klub Zagreb, before going on to study cinematography at the Academy of Performing Arts in Prague in 1968. He graduated in 1973 and made several short films, before shooting his first feature film in 1974, Rajko Grlić's Whichever Way the Ball Bounces (Kud puklo da puklo), which was originally shot on 16 mm film and later transferred to 35 mm.

After that he shot Krešo Golik's Violet (Ljubica, 1978), and that same year he won the Golden Arena for Best Cinematography for his work on Rajko Grlić's Bravo Maestro and Srđan Karanović's Fragrance of Wild Flowers (Miris poljskog cveća).

His second Golden Arena came in 1983 for Something In-Between and his other notable films in the 1980s and 1990s were Fadil Hadžić's The Ambassador (Ambasador, 1984), It takes three for happiness (Za sreću je potrebno troje, 1985), How the War Started on My Island (Kako je rat počeo na mom otoku, 1996). In 2003 he won his third Golden Arena for Witnesses (Svjedoci), directed by Vinko Brešan.

After working with many Yugoslav and Croatian directors, Zalar moved to Germany in the late 1990s, where he continued to work on a number of television films, series and documentaries, as well as international feature film co-productions.

== Selected filmography ==
- Whichever Way the Ball Bounces (Kud puklo da puklo, 1974)
- Bravo Maestro (1978)
- Violet (Ljubica, 1978)
- Something In-Between (Nešto između, 1983)
- The Ambassador (Ambasador, 1984)
- Reflections (Već viđeno, 1987)
- The General (Il generale, 1987)
- Cognac (Tajna manastirske rakije, 1988)
- How the War Started on My Island (Kako je rat počeo na mom otoku, 1996)
- Marshal Tito's Spirit (Maršal, 1999)
- Witnesses (Svjedoci, 2003)
- Will Not End Here (Nije kraj, 2008)
