= Novine =

Croatian TV series

- Genre: Drama
- Created by: Ivica Đikić
- Written by: Ivica Đikić
- Country of origin: Croatia
- Original language: Croatian
- No. of seasons: 3
- No. of episodes: 33 (list of episodes)

Production
- Executive producers: Miodrag Sila; Nebojša Taraba
- Running time: 50 minutes

Original release
- Network: HRT 1
- Release: 16 October 2016 – 4 May 2020

Novine (English: The Paper), is a Croatian drama television series created by Ivica Đikić, a journalist who had served as editor-in-chief of Rijeka's Novi list several years earlier. The story takes place in Rijeka, as it describes the life and work of a journalist and editor of a fictitious Novine, which is considered to be the last independent and "serious" newspaper in Croatia.

The series was broadcast on HRT from 16 October 2016 to 4 May 2020. On 3 April 2018, it was announced that Novine is set to become the first Croatian-language drama series to be released on Netflix.

== Plot ==
Marijo Kardum (Aleksandar Cvjetković), an influential construction tycoon, is suddenly in a hurry to take over the Novine because young journalist Andrej Marinković (Goran Marković) has begun investigating a mysterious car accident with which the future owner is closely linked. The sudden change of ownership is also triggered by internal turmoil in the newsroom, driven by a desire for power, vanity and ambition. At the heart of these turmoil are veteran journalists Dijana Mitrović (Branka Katić), Nikola Martić (Trpimir Jurkić), Martin Vidov (Zijad Gračić) and Alenka Jović-Marinković (Olga Pakalović), who are replaced by editor-in-chief.

== Episodes ==
Season	Episodes	Originally released	
Season	Episodes	First released	Last released
1	12	16 October 2016	8 January 2017
2	11	24 September 2018	3 December 2018
3	10	2 March 2020	4 May 2020

== Cast ==
=== Main cast ===
Actor	Character	Season		
Actor	Character	1	2	3
Branka Katić	Dijana Mitrović	Main	Main	Main
Trpimir Jurkić	Nikola Martić	Main	Main	Main
Aleksandar Cvjetković	Mario Kardum	Main	Main	Main
Dragan Despot	Ludvig Tomašević	Main	Main	Main
Zdenko Jelčić	Blago Antić	Main	Main	Main
Zijad Gračić	Martin Vidov	Main	Main	Main
Goran Marković	Andrej Marinković	Main	Main	Main
Tihana Lazović	Tena Latinović	Main	Main	Main
Olga Pakalović	Alenka Jović Marinković	Main	Main	Main
Boris Svrtan	Prime Minister Lozančić	Main	Main	Main
Dražen Mikulić	Jure Jolić	Main	Main	Main
Livio Badurina	Matko Jakovljević		Main	Main

=== Supporting cast ===
Actor	Character	Season		
Actor	Character	1	2	3
Katarina Bistrović-Darvaš	Dunja Martić	Recurring	Recurring	Recurring
Darko Milas	Ilija Bubalo	Recurring	Recurring	Recurring
Izudin Bajrović	Marinko Prskalo	Recurring	Recurring	Recurring
Tena Nemet Brankov	Lara Tomašević	Recurring	Recurring	Recurring
Ksenija Pajić	Julijana Tomašević	Recurring	Recurring	Recurring
Nikša Butijer	Leo Grubišić	Recurring	Recurring	Recurring
Glorija Dubelj	Barbara	Recurring	Recurring	Recurring
Zdenko Botić	Archbishop Matija Bilaver	Recurring	Recurring	Recurring
Željko Königsknecht	Boris Males	Recurring	Recurring	Recurring
Alen Liverić	Toni Nardelli	Recurring	Recurring	
Ivica Pucar	Dario Antić	Recurring	Recurring	
Edita Karađole	Dubravka Kardum	Recurring	Recurring	
Goran Grgić	Mihael Popović	Recurring		Recurring
Damir Lončar	Josip Vuković	Recurring		
Nives Ivanković	Jelena Krsnik		Recurring	
Goran Koši	Alen Javor		Recurring	Recurring
Draško Zidar	Zvonimir Mihalić		Recurring	Recurring
Siniša Popović	Lovro Ljubičić		Recurring	Recurring
Daria Lorenci	Katarina Jerkov			Recurring
Krešimir Mikić	Joško Jerkov			Recurring
Nadia Cvitanović	Žana			Recurring
Ivan Bekjarev	Jovan Arbutina			Recurring
Mirko Soldano	Nuncij Bertolazzi			Recurring

== Production ==
The series was mostly filmed in Rijeka, which very rarely appears as the main setting in Croatian films and series. The series was directed by Dalibor Matanić. Novine had its Zagreb premiere on 13 October 2016 at Cinestar in Branimir Center.

The filming of a second season began in 2018, and episodes began airing in September 2018. The final season of HRT's Novine series began airing on 3 March 2020.

== Reception ==
Critics have noted the strong influence of the so-called nordic noir television thrillers, as well as the popular American television series The Wire, which pays tribute to numerous details.

Novine is the largest single export of one Croatian audiovisual product in Croatian history. The offer had already arrived from Channel 4, but the distributor had planned a bigger stake and succeeded. It is marketed to nearly half a billion viewers. It is also the second series in a Slavic language to achieve notable international success, after the Russian Silver Spoon. This will make the series available in more than 130 countries worldwide and is a major leap into the US and global markets.
