= The Living Truth =

1972 film by Tomislav Radić

- DVD cover
- Croatian: Živa istina
- Directed by: Tomislav Radić
- Screenplay by: Tomislav Radić
- Produced by: Kruno Heidler
- Starring: Božidarka Frajt; Ružica Rošoci; Vesna Veselić; Zlatica Dubravčić; Zdenka Livajsić; Inge Grandić; Vjeran Zuppa; Mira Wolf; Astrid Turina; Joško Marušić; Eva Ras
- Cinematography: Dragutin Novak
- Edited by: Maja Filjak-Bilandžija
- Music by: Arsen Dedić
- Production company: Radiotelevision Zagreb Film Authors' Studio
- Release date: 14 July 1972 (Yugoslavia)
- Running time: 77 minutes
- Country: Yugoslavia
- Language: Croatian

The Living Truth (Živa istina), also released as Real Truth, is a 1972 Yugoslav film directed and written by Tomislav Radić, starring Božidarka Frajt.

Radić's directorial debut, a very low-budget cinéma vérité-style film about the everyday life of a struggling actress was met with critical acclaim and is considered one of the best Croatian films of the 1970s. It started the career of Božidarka Frajt, whose performance won the Golden Arena for Best Actress at the 1972 Pula Film Festival.

== Plot ==
Božidarka Frajt (playing herself) is an actress who is unsuccessfully looking for a job in Zagreb. The film follows her everyday life: she spends time with her friends and colleagues, shoots a television commercial, goes to a party, remembers her difficult childhood as a war orphan, and contemplates her professional and personal failures. Finally, she visits theatre manager Vjeran Zuppa in his office and asks for a job, but is turned down.

== Background ==
Before he started to work on his feature film debut, Tomislav Radić, an accomplished theatre director, had gained some filmmaking experience while shooting 30-minute documentaries about people with unusual occupations for Radiotelevision Zagreb. Radić had an idea to make a feature film about an actress who is unable to find acting jobs and works as a model instead. One day he ran across his acquaintance Božidarka Frajt, an actress whose status at the time was very similar to that of his character. Despite holding an acting diploma, then-30-year-old Frajt was unable to find permanent employment, being constrained to minor film roles and occasional modeling work. Instead of making a documentary about Frajt, Radić set out to make a feature film about a woman very much like her, in which the other participants would play themselves, likewise appearing under their own names.

== Production ==
The film was shot in the first half of 1971, over nine working days, in ultra-low budget conditions, using 16 mm black-and-white film which was later transferred to 35 mm format. Framing and camera movement were not planned in advance; instead, the decisions were made on the spot, in agreement between the cinematographer Dragutin Novak and the director.

Radić gave the following background of the film's final scene with Božidarka Frajt and Vjeran Zuppa:

Vjeran Zuppa was at the time my boss at the ITD Theater, where he was the general manager and I was the technical director. I thought it'd be a good idea to shoot a scene in which this actress, the protagonist, is looking for a job and is unable to get it. [...] There was no predetermined dialogue. The instructions were for Boža [Božidarka Frajt] to ask for a job, and whatever she asked for, Zuppa was to dismiss. And that's how they did it. As always, I stood at the side and gave Boža instructions by use of mime, hand gestures and grimaces: now give him a glance, turn to the other side, now insist some more, ask him something else, now be quiet, now sit down, now stand up... When I signed a tear rolling down the cheek with my finger, she actually managed to break into tears, because she is truly a brilliant actress who acts in genuine way, as if it's actually happening, and has the ability to do and to say everything as if she is doing it for the first time.

== Analysis ==
Most of the scenes in The Living Truth feature Frajt (right) talking to her friends (Eva Ras pictured).

Croatian film critic Nenad Polimac argued that the film was not actually meant to be cinéma vérité, and could not be properly described as such. According to him, the very idea of actors playing themselves was radically different from anything that could be seen in the cinema of the era. Also, instead of preserving the continuity of the footage, Radić broke the scenes into short fragments that were interspersed throughout the film, creating a more dynamic slice-of-life feel and structure. The editing was sometimes deliberately crude, with abrupt cuts. The "dirty" aesthetics of the film was thus a mix of extreme realism and extreme artificiality.

== Reception and legacy ==
The film's gritty, naturalist character came as a shock to many contemporary viewers, but most critics received it very positively. Still, the political establishment was disapproving: The Living Truth was characterized as an "unrepresentative depiction of the social scene" and received the permit for public screening only after a lengthy delay.

The film was shown in the out-of-competition section of the 1972 Pula Film Festival, which caused protests from the critics. In the end, the festival jury – presided by Stipe Šuvar – made an unprecedented decision to award Golden Arena for Best Actress to Božidarka Frajt, contrary to the festival's regulations. Frajt's highly dynamic, dominant personality offset the otherwise depressing setting of the film, and her performance instantly made her one the leading actresses of Croatian and Yugoslav cinema.

In a 1999 poll among 44 Croatian film critics and film historians, The Living Truth placed 20th in the list of all-time best Croatian films.

The film was photochemically restored in 1998, digitally restored in 2009, and released on DVD in 2010. A copy of the film has been selected for preservation in the Croatian State Archives.

== Sources ==
- Gilić, Nikica (2014). "Rane 1970-e i filmski slučaj Tomislava Radića" [Early 1970s and the Cinematic Case of Tomislav Radić] (PDF). Poznańskie Studia Slawistyczne (in Croatian) (6): 91–103. doi:10.14746/pss.2014.6.6.
