= Witnesses (2003 film) =

2003 film

- Croatian: Svjedoci
- Directed by: Vinko Brešan
- Screenplay by: Vinko Brešan; Živko Zalar
- Based on: Ovce od gipsa by Jurica Pavičić
- Produced by: Ivan Maloča
- Starring: Leon Lučev
- Cinematography: Živko Zalar
- Edited by: Sandra Botica
- Music by: Mate Matišić
- Release date: 20 July 2003
- Running time: 90 minutes
- Country: Croatia
- Language: Croatian

Witnesses (Croatian: Svjedoci) is a Croatian drama film directed by Vinko Brešan. It was released in 2003.

The film's screenplay is based on Jurica Pavičić's 1997 novel Ovce od gipsa, which was in turn inspired by a real-life case of murder of the Zec family in Zagreb in 1991.

== Synopsis ==
The plot of the movie is centered in the city of Karlovac in 1992, during the Croatian War of Independence. The front lines, where Croatian and Serbian forces fight each other, lie near the city. Meanwhile, in the city of Karlovac, a Serbian civilian Vasić is murdered. The story follows the local police officer Barbir, who tries to solve the murder in spite of ethnic hatred and war revolving nearby.

== Cast ==
- Leon Lučev as Krešo
- Alma Prica as the journalist
- Mirjana Karanović as the mother
- Dražen Kühn as Barbir
- Krešimir Mikić as Joško
- Marinko Prga as Vojo
- Bojan Navojec as Barić
- Ljubomir Kerekeš as Dr. Matić
- Predrag Vušović as Ljubo
- Tarik Filipović as the public prosecutor
- Rene Bitorajac as the Albanian
- Ivo Gregurević as the father
- Vanja Drach as the pensioner
- Helena Buljan as the neighbour
