= Diploma za smrt =

- Directed by: Živorad Tomić
- Cinematography: Silvestar Kolbas
- Edited by: Zoltan Wagner
- Release date: 25 July 1989 (Yugoslavia)
- Running time: c. 105 minutes
- Country: Yugoslavia

Diploma za smrt (English: The Death Degree) is a 1989 Croatian crime drama film and three part miniseries directed by Živorad Tomić, starring Ranko Zidarić and Filip Šovagović.

Diploma za smrt is preserved by the Croatian State Archives.

== Plot ==
=== Part One ===
In 1980's Zagreb, Bero (Ranko Zidarić) and Nik, the lawyer, (Filip Šovagović) are two best friends. Upon graduating from Zagreb Faculty of Economics, Bero struggles to find a decent job, so he does manual labour on a local market. His girlfriend Vlasta reveals him that she is pregnant but considers having an abortion because they still lack money to make a good living. Bero strongly opposes this idea, so he pushes himself to the limits by working hard on the market which eventually makes him ill. Bero's friend Nik uses his connections to find his friend a job as a deputy accountant manager in local wholesale company. In the meantime, Vlasta informs Bero that she had an abortion anyway, for which he leaves her. Once he started working on a new job, Bero found out that company's warehouse manager Grga is involved in a smuggling business, so he makes a plan with his buddy Nik to blackmail Grga into handing them over the management of his illegal operations. Once confronted with evidence against him, Grga reluctantly agrees to their demands. Once he took over Grga's business, Bero met Renata, their customer and owner of the Kruna boutique, with whom he soon develops a romantic relationship. During one night in a bar, Renata introduces Bero with: Borut, Zlatko, Stipe and Pavel who all appear very suspicious to Bero. When Bero asks Renata further questions about these people, she explains that they are actually an illegal business cartel, out of which Zlatko operates his pizza place, Stipe restaurant, Pavel motel on Zagreb-Karlovac Road while she operates her boutique. The real owner of these business is Jakov Guberina-Guba (Ivo Gregurević), who resides in Munich and regularly takes fifty percent of their profit. Bero talks Renata into allowing him to co-run the boutique with her, but parallelly starts plotting with Nik on how to take over their businesses. Renata introduces Bero to an alcoholic car shop owner Franc, who asks Renata for a loan in order to repay his debts. Renata laughs him off, but Bero encourages Franc by giving him his business card. Bero decides to marry Renata after which she lets him in charge of the boutique completely. In spite of Renata's opinion, Bero gives the loan to the Franc but also ties him with a mortgage agreement. After finding out of Bero's deal with Franc, she gets angry at Bero and tells him that this will bring him in confrontation with Guba. Renata's behaviour annoys Bero, so he angrily leaves their house. In the last scene we find out that Bero went to sleep over at Nik's place. After phone call from Renata, Nik's wife concludes that "Bero's marriage won't last for long".

=== Part Two ===
Bero runs the businesses successfully, so he buys his sister Mirjana a new apartment. His relationship with Renata further deteriorates after she accuses him of buying this apartment which her money which ends up in a quarrel. Renata soon gets a phone call from Nik, who tells her that Bero authorized him to file a divorce from her. When asking Nik about her boutique and money, he responds that all of this is no longer hers. Renata bursts into tears calling Nik a "lawyer scum". Afterwards, Nik remarks to Bero sitting across him that "he is really a pig", to which Bero cold bloodedly replies: "I know". In the meantime, Guba appears in Zagreb. He summons emotionally wounded Renata to his residence and starts asking questions about Bero. He then forbids her from leaving Zagreb. Guba then pays a visit to Bero in his boutique, telling him that he doesn't really care who is in charge of that place as long as he gets his provisions regularly, but Bero ignores him. Foreseeing the future confrontation, Bero and Nik hire their old buddy Božo as a bodyguard and tell him to get another guy. Soon Guba sends his henchmen Rus (The Russian) and Bager (The Excavator) to intimidate and beat up Bero, but as they appear before Bero, he calls his own bodyguards Božo and Bruno in aid. In the ensuing brawl Bero's bodyguards beat off the attackers. In the aftermath of the fight, Bero tells Bager and Rus to: "send his regards to Mr. Guberina". Bero and Nik then pay a visit to Franc to get their payment, but since he didn't have the money, they tell him to meet them next day in the public administration office in order to sign over his property to them. The gambling debts tied Borut also visits Guba, asking for more money but Guba rejects him, and gives him the twenty days deadline for repaying the debts. Drunk and depressed Franc gets visit from Guba's bodyguards but after he slaps Rus, the henchmen kill him by throwing a piece of car axle on his head. Borut tries his luck again by asking Bero for the loan to which Bero agrees. On a cartel meeting, Guba tells other members that Pavel is the only one who is running his business well and that if anyone else loses its money, this person will also lose his head. In the meantime, Borut also lost his property to Bero and talks Renata into fleeing the country with him. Renata double-crosses Borut, by informing Guba about his plans so he gets intercepted by Guba's henchmen. He tried to escape them, but they caught him up and Bager broke Borut's neck. Guba then invites Bero on a business lunch and tries to persuade him into becoming his business partner. Bero rejects him. Guba's henchmen respond by starting to trash Bero's businesses. One of Bero's bodyguards Božo suggests ambushing Rus and Bager in Bero's apartment in which they succeed. They subsequently persuade Rus and Bager to stab Guba to death. Guba's former henchmen then take his body to a construction site, where they bury it under a pile of liquid concrete.

=== Part Three ===
After Guba's death, Bero, Nik, Božo and Guba's old henchmen force Guba's cousin Zlatko to sign over his pizza place to Rus and Bager and then force him to leave to Umag. Boban calls Stipe, Pavel, and remaining members of the cartel on a meeting where he intensifies their payments to each month instead of every three months as they paid to Guba. Initially they revolt but then Nik intimidates them by demonstrating that he knows all about their criminal records. They then offer Stipe, the manager of a Riva restaurant to buy over his property, since Bero wanted to turn it into a Brazilian restaurant. Stipe rejects them with disdain, but soon after gets increasingly concerned that he might be eliminated next. Nik and Božo start plotting with Stipe's wife, whom he regularly beats, by offering her that they will kill Stipe and they also won't reveal that she is having an affair with a taxi driver, but they demand that she sells them the restaurant subsequently. After the wife agrees, Stipe gets run over by a car during the night. After Stipe's death, one of the remaining cartel member Pavel gets ever more defiant. In the meantime, Bero reconciles with his old girlfriend Vlasta and gives her Renata's old boutique. On the next meeting, Bero invites the remaining members at an opening ceremony to Stipe's old place which he now turned into a Brazilian restaurant, named Rio. Right before attending the ceremony at Rio, Nik receives a phone call from Pavel in which he informs him that he had his daughter kidnapped and that he wants to meet him in exchange for releasing the kid. Nik sees Pavel at his residence where Pavel tells him that he and his friend "have gone too far" but since Nik seems more reasonable, he wants him to kill Bero at the opening ceremony or else his daughter will float in Sava river. At first Nik goes on a rampage looking for his daughter and ends up beating Renata, because he thought that she knows where his daughter is. He also asks her: "You want me to kill Bero, don't you?" to which she responds in cries negatively. At the restaurant opening Bero gets concerned because Nik is not arriving. In the meantime, Nik successfully bribes Tuš, yet another cartel member who agrees to help him, but once they came to the apparent safe house, it turns out that Pavel already moved the kid to a different location while Nik only managed to get his daughter's school bag. Renata appears on the Rio opening and tells Bero that Pavel kidnapped Nik's daughter, after which Bero summons Pavel to the meeting room where he tries to beat him to release the kid. Pavel takes all the beating and right before Bero takes out his pistol to kill him, a desperate Nik enters the room and shots his friend to death. Pavel then calmly goes to the phone and instructs his men to release the kid. He then turns to Nik and tells him: "I might be scum but I keep my word". After Pavel leaves the room, Nik remains bluntly watching at his friend's dead body.

== Cast ==
- Ranko Zidarić as Berislav "Bero" Boban
- Filip Šovagović as Nikola "Nik" Kolarić
- Ksenija Pajić as Renata Kočiš
- Ivo Gregurević as Jakov "Guba" Guberina
- Fabijan Šovagović as Pavel Blječki
- Dejan Aćimović as Božo
- Krunoslav Šarić as Borut Jalcek
- Mladen Crnobrnja as Franc
- Zdenko Jelčić as Stipe Peruzović
- Ljubo Zečević as Grga
