= Garcia (film) =

Garcia is a Croatian film directed by Dejan Šorak. It was released in 1999.
