= The Time of Warriors =

The Time of Warriors (Vrijeme ratnika) is a 1991 Croatian film directed by Dejan Šorak, starring Josip Genda and Kruno Šarić.

== Plot ==
While Fabijan (Josip Genda) and Dakar (Kruno Šarić) are fishing on a river near Zagreb, they are suddenly attacked by unknown assassins. The two friends are forced to draw on their combat experience in order to save their lives, all the while trying to find out the identity and the motives of the attackers.
