= Ranko Zidarić =

Croatian actor and screenwriter

- Born: 1 February 1965 (age 61); Zagreb, SR Croatia, SFR Yugoslavia
- Occupations: Actor, screenwriter
- Years active: 1980s–present
- Spouses: Saša Broz (m. 1994; div. 2000); Ivana Uhlik (m. 2007)
- Children: 2
- Relatives: Mišo Broz (father-in-law); Josip Broz Tito (grandfather-in-law); Jovanka Broz (grandmother-in-law)

Ranko Zidarić (born 1 February 1965) is a Croatian actor and screenwriter.

== Biography ==
Born in Zagreb to a father Krešimir (1933–1998), who was also an actor, and a mother Danica "Seka" Zidarić (d. 2018), Ranko graduated from the Academy of Dramatic Art at the University of Zagreb in 1990.

He voiced Buzz Lightyear in the Croatian-language dub of the Toy Story franchise and Makunga in Madagascar: Escape 2 Africa.

In 2012, on behalf of the "Sova Zone" project, he starred, co-written and co-produced the sitcom Špica, with Gavella colleague Filip Šovagović.

== Personal life ==
In 1994, Zidarić married Croatian film director Saša Broz, a granddaughter of the President of Yugoslavia Josip Broz Tito. They have a daughter Sara, and got divorced in 2000.

In 2007, Zidarić married his second wife Ivana Uhlik, with whom he has a daughter Zora.

== Filmography ==
Year	Title	Role	Notes
1988	Aloa: Festivity of the Whores		
1988	Honor Bound		
1988	The Dirty Dozen: The Fatal Mission	Vasco Petrović	
1988	U sredini mojih dana		
1989	Krvopijci		
1989	Diploma za smrt	Berislav "Bero" Boban	
1991	Papa mora umrijeti	Father Santini	
1992	Hod u tami		
1993	Death Train	Pilot	
1994	Gospa		
1995	Prolazi sve		
1999	Četverored	Tadija Jelčić	
2000	Pomor tuljana		
2001	Slow Surrender		
2002	Prezimiti u Riju		
2003	Kiss of Life	Chief	
2003	Below the Line	Mirko	
2004	Radio i ja		
2005	Pušća Bistra	Surlić "Surla"	
2006	Crveno i crno	Trainer	
2007	Armin	Father	
2007	Naši sretni trenuci		
2008	Reality	Rambo	
