= Aloa: Festivity of the Whores =

- Directed by: Lordan Zafranović
- Written by: Lordan Zafranović; Veljko Barbieri
- Based on: Zatvor od oleandrovog lišća by Veljko Barbieri
- Produced by: Sulejman Kapić; Miroslav Lilić
- Starring: Neda Arnerić; Ranko Zidarić; Stevo Žigon; Dušica Žegarac
- Cinematography: Andrija Pivčević
- Release date: 1988
- Running time: 120 minute
- Country: Yugoslavia
- Language: Serbo-Croatian

Aloa: Festivity of the Whores (Serbo-Croatian: Haloa – Praznik kurvi) is a 1988 Yugoslav film directed by Lordan Zafranović. It is based on a novel by Veljko Barbieri. The film is also known in English as Aloa - The Whores' Feast or Aloa: The Whores' Festival.

The film was presented as an example in Yugoslavian film, of a portrayal of a "sexually active female whose liberated eroticisim is smothered by death".

The film received the Critics' Award at the Pula Film Festival, where Neda Arnerić received the Golden Arena for Best Actress for her role in the film. It was screened at the Venice festival.
