= Bojana Gregorić =

Croatian actress (born 1972)

Bojana Gregorić-Vejzović
- Born: Bojana Gregorić; 17 February 1972 (age 54); Zagreb, SR Croatia, SFR Yugoslavia
- Education: Academy of Dramatic Art; University of Zagreb
- Occupation: Actress
- Years active: 1996–present
- Notable work: Theatre: “The threepenny Opera” as Jenny (2024); “The Mother” as mother Anna (2023); “Richard III” as queen Margarette (2018); "August: Osage County" as Barbara Weton Fordam (2015); “Fedra” as Fedra (2007); “Midsummer Night dream” Hermia (2007); “Popcorn” as Brook Daniels (2003); “Hamlet” as Ofelia (2000)
- Spouse: Enes Vejzović (m. 2006)
- Children: 2
- Mother: Božidarka Frajt

Bojana Gregorić-Vejzović (born 17 February 1972) is a Croatian film, theatre, and television actress. She starred in Naša mala klinika as Dr. Lili Štriga, also appeared in the biographical drama Lea and Darija and voiced Helen Parr in the Croatian-language dub of The Incredibles franchise.

== Personal life ==
Bojana Gregorić-Vejzović was born in Zagreb in 1972. Her father, Boris Gregorić, was a film producer, while her mother, Božidarka Frajt, an ethnic Serb, is a prominent actress.

In 2006, she married Croatian actor, Enes Vejzović, with whom she has two children; a son, Raul, and a daughter, Zoe.
