= Two Players from the Bench =

2005 film

- Croatian: Dva igrača s klupe
- Directed by: Dejan Šorak
- Written by: Dejan Šorak
- Produced by: Ivan Maloča
- Starring: Goran Navojec; Borko Perić; Tarik Filipović
- Cinematography: Vjekoslav Vrdoljak
- Music by: Mate Matišić
- Release date: 22 July 2005
- Running time: 112 minutes
- Country: Croatia
- Language: Croatian

Two Players from the Bench (Croatian: Dva igrača s klupe) is a Croatian comedy-drama film directed by Dejan Šorak. It was released in 2005.

== Cast ==
- Goran Navojec - Ante Jukić
- Borko Perić - Duško Katran
- Tarik Filipović - Antiša
- Dora Lipovčan - Stela
- Renne Gjoni - The Hague Prosecutor

== Sources ==
- "Dva igrača s klupe" (in Croatian).
