= Passion According to Matthew =

- Theatrical poster
- Croatian: Muke po Mati
- Directed by: Lordan Zafranović
- Screenplay by: Mirko Kovač; Lordan Zafranović
- Starring: Boris Cavazza; Alicia Jackiewicz; Božidarka Frajt; Mirko Boman; Ivan Prebeg; Žarko Radić; Hermina Pipinić
- Cinematography: Karpo Aćimović-Godina
- Edited by: Josip Remenar
- Production companies: Jadran Film; Croatia Film
- Release date: 1975
- Running time: 91 minutes
- Country: Yugoslavia
- Language: Serbo-Croatian

Passion According to Matthew (Muke po Mati) is a 1975 Yugoslavian film directed by Lordan Zafranović. At the 1975 Pula Film Festival it received awards for directing, cinematography and creativity.

The film stars Boris Cavazza as Matthew. It was written by Mirko Kovač and Lordan Zafranović and was produced by Jadran Film and Croatia Film.

== Cast ==
The cast of Passion According to Matthew includes Boris Cavazza as Matthew, Alicja Jachiewicz as Ora, Žarko Radić as Luke, Božidarka Frajt as Mother, Mirko Boman and Hermina Pipinić.

== Awards ==
- Pula Film Festival, 1975:
  - Lordan Zafranović – the "Milton Manaki" film critics' award
  - Karpo Aćimović-Godina - the "Foto" award for cinematography
  - Lordan Zafranović - the "Mladost" award for creative contributions
