= List of Novine episodes =

Novine is a Croatian drama television series that ran on HRT. Three seasons were aired from 16 October 2016 to 4 May 2020.

== Series overview ==
Season	Episodes	Originally released	
Season	Episodes	First released	Last released
1	12	16 October 2016	8 January 2017
2	11	24 September 2018	3 December 2018
3	10	2 March 2020	4 May 2020

=== Season 1 (2016–17) ===
No. overall	No. in season	Title	Original release date
1	1	"Episode 1"	16 October 2016
Mario Kardum, a powerful and influential construction magnate, accelerates the acquisition of Novine when journalist Andrej Marinković begins probing into a traffic accident that claimed three lives, with someone connected to Kardum being implicated.
2	2	"Episode 2"	23 October 2016
Kardum's frustration with the editor-in-chief for not publishing the acquisition news is a cover for internal changes in the newsroom. Andrej persists in his investigation into the accident, despite his conflict with the police chief, who is also his best man.
3	3	"Episode 3"	30 October 2016
Following a front-page article about the accident, an enraged Kardum demands that the purchase contract be signed without delay. Mitrović, Martić, and Marinković devise a strategy to maintain some independence under the new ownership.
4	4	"Episode 4"	6 November 2016
On his final day as Editor, Vidov publishes an exposé on Tetra Services that could shame several top officials. Nikola, who had opposed the article, warns Alenka, the incoming Editor, about it. Alenka halts its release just in time.
5	5	"Episode 5"	13 November 2016
The new editor-in-chief takes over the leadership of the editorial team. Although she prevented the publication of an article about a suspicious company, the new owner demands that she fire the journalist who wrote the article.
6	6	"Episode 6"	20 November 2016
The new owner of "Novine" insists on firing the young journalist. The new editor-in-chief, unable to resist the pressure, asks Tenin's immediate superior to support her decision, but he refuses. Another journalist disagrees with the new leadership and seeks help finding a position at a rival newspaper. Meanwhile, to avoid the fallout from the Tetra Services scandal, the mayor demands that his cabinet chief take full responsibility for the company's financial wrongdoing and report himself to the authorities.
7	7	"Episode 7"	27 November 2016
8	8	"Episode 8"	4 December 2016
9	9	"Episode 9"	11 December 2016
10	10	"Episode 10"	18 December 2016
11	11	"Episode 11"	8 January 2017
12	12	"Episode 12"	8 January 2017

=== Season 2 (2018) ===
No. overall	No. in season	Title	Original release date
13	1	"Episode 1"	24 September 2018
14	2	"Episode 2"	1 October 2018
15	3	"Episode 3"	8 October 2018
16	4	"Episode 4"	15 October 2018
17	5	"Episode 5"	22 October 2018
18	6	"Episode 6"	29 October 2018
19	7	"Episode 7"	5 November 2018
20	8	"Episode 8"	12 November 2018
21	9	"Episode 9"	19 November 2018
22	10	"Episode 10"	26 November 2018
23	11	"Episode 11"	3 December 2018

=== Season 3 (2020) ===
No. overall	No. in season	Title	Original release date
24	1	"Episode 1"	2 March 2020
25	2	"Episode 2"	9 March 2020
26	3	"Episode 3"	16 March 2020
27	4	"Episode 4"	23 March 2020
28	5	"Episode 5"	30 March 2020
29	6	"Episode 6"	6 April 2020
30	7	"Episode 7"	13 April 2020
31	8	"Episode 8"	20 April 2020
32	9	"Episode 9"	27 April 2020
33	10	"Episode 10"	4 May 2020
