= Ivica Đikić =

Bosnian-Croatian author and journalist

- Born: 1977 (age 48–49); Duvno, SR Bosnia and Herzegovina, Yugoslavia
- Citizenship: Bosnia and Herzegovina Croatia
- Occupations: Writer, journalist
- Writing career
- Language: Croatian
- Genre: Novels
- Notable work: Cirkus Columbia
- Notable awards: Meša Selimović Award

Ivica Đikić is a Bosnian writer and journalist. He was born 1977, in Tomislavgrad, SR Bosnia and Herzegovina, Yugoslavia.

Ivica Đikić

Instagram information
- Page: dikicivica
- Followers: 1,473

== Career ==
=== Journalist career ===
He worked as a journalist for few Croatian newspapers, and he left the most impact on far left newspaper Feral Tribune from Split where he worked in 1996. He started to work as a journalist from his 16, he was also active in Slobodna Dalmacija. From 2001 he edited few Croatian magazines like Novi list.

=== Writing career ===
He published his first novel in 2003 named Cirkus Columbia, published by Feral Tribune. He is also awarded with Meša Selimović Award for this novel. The 2010 movie Cirkus Columbia is based on his novel. The novel is set in writer's hometown Tomislavgrad, a small town in Herzegovina in early 1990s, just before Bosnian War. In 2004 Đikić published political biography of former Croatian president Stjepan Mesić named Domovinski obrat (English: Homeland reversal), published by VBZ from Zagreb. In 2007 Đikić wrote his second novel called Ništa sljezove boje (English: Nothing in Marshmallow Colour), published by Feral Tribune. This new novel is composed of three stories, Zeleni dvorac (English: Green Castle), Probaj zaspati, molim te (English: Please, Try to Sleep) and Kao da ništa nije bilo (English: Like Nothing Happened). He is also the primary writer of the television series Novine.
