= Mia Begović =

Croatian actress

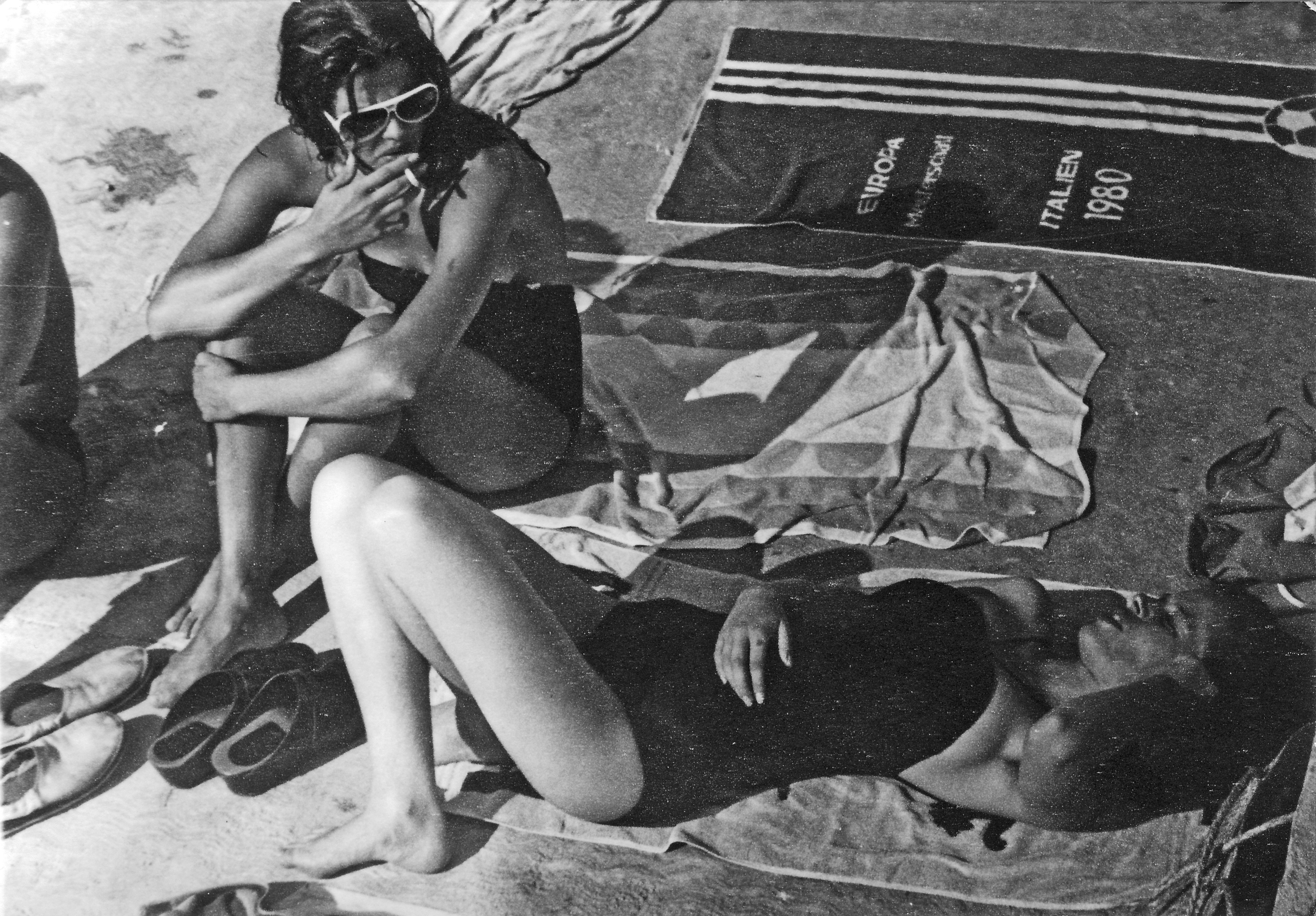
- Begović (left) at the Pula Film Festival during the early 1980s
- Born: Mia Begović; 11 January 1963 (age 62); Trpanj, PR Croatia, Yugoslavia
- Years active: 1986–present
- Spouses: Ronald Lopatny (divorced); Željko Žnidarić (m. 2004; div. 2010)
- Children: 1
- Relatives: Ena Begović (sister)

Mia Begović (pronounced [miːə bêːɡoʋitɕ]; born 11 January 1963) is a Croatian film, stage, and television actress. She is best known as the younger sister of the late Croatian actress Ena Begović.

== Personal life ==
Born in Trpanj to mother Terezija and father Nikola Begović, Mia is the younger sister of the late actress, Ena, who died in a traffic accident on the island of Brač, in August 2000.

Mia was married to the famous water polo player, Ronald Lopatni, with whom she has a daughter born in 1991, Maja Lena.

In 2004 Mia married Željko Žnidarić, but the couple got divorced in 2010.

She lives and works in Zagreb.

== Filmography ==
- Captain America (1991)
- Villa Maria (2004)
- Zabranjena ljubav (2005)
- Tata i zetovi (2006–2007)
- Ponos Ratkajevih (2007–2008)
- Zakon ljubavi (2008)
- Periferija City (2010)
- Blago nama (2020–2022)
