= Agonija =

- Directed by: Jakov Sedlar
- Based on: U agoniji by Miroslav Krleža
- Starring: Ena Begović; Sven Medvešek
- Release date: 1998
- Running time: 92 minutes
- Country: Croatia
- Language: Serbo-Croatian

Agonija is a 1998 Croatian film directed by Jakov Sedlar. The film is based on U agoniji, a play by Miroslav Krleža.

== Plot ==
To pay off his gambling debts, Lembach, a former officer of the Austro-Hungarian army, pressures his wife, and her lover, Krizovec for money. But Krizovec has his own complicated love life.

== Cast ==
- Ena Begović as Laura Lenbach
- Sven Medvešek as Krizovec
- Božidar Alić as Barun Lenbach
- Nives Ivanković as Izabela Georgijevna
- Zoja Odak as Izabela's lover
- Tarik Filipović as the inspector
