= Živorad Tomić =

Živorad Tomić (born 15 June 1951) is a Croatian film director, screenwriter and critic. Tomić was one of the most prominent Croatian film critics from the mid-1970s to the late 1990s.

Tomić was born in 1951 in Zagreb. He studied comparative literature and English studies at the Faculty of Humanities and Social Sciences, and film and television directing at the Academy of Dramatic Art in Zagreb. Since 1984, he was a member of the film editorial board at Radiotelevision Zagreb.

He is the recipient of the 2015 Vladimir Vuković Lifetime Achievement Award by the Croatian Film Critics' Society.

== Works ==
=== Feature films ===
- Kraljeva završnica (1987)
- Diploma za smrt (1989)

=== Books ===
- Užitak gledanja: zapisi o svjetskom filmu [The Joy of Watching: Notes on the World Cinema]. Zagreb: Croatian Society of Film Critics & V.B.Z. 2007. ISBN 978-953-201-731-1.
