= I Want to Live (1982 film) =

I Want to Live (Croatian: Hoću živjeti) is a 1982 Croatian film directed by Miroslav Mikuljan, starring Fabijan Šovagović, Milan Štrljić and Ena Begović.
