= Rhythm of a Crime =

- Croatian: Ritam zločina
- Directed by: Zoran Tadić
- Based on: "Dobri duh Zagreba" by Pavao Pavličić
- Starring: Ivica Vidović; Fabijan Šovagović; Božidarka Frajt
- Cinematography: Goran Trbuljak
- Music by: Hrvoje Hegedušić
- Release date: 15 June 1981
- Running time: 89 min
- Country: Yugoslavia
- Language: Croatian

Rhythm of a Crime (Croatian: Ritam zločina) is a 1981 Yugoslav fantasy crime film directed by Zoran Tadić, made in Serbian-Croatian co-production. It is based on "Dobri duh Zagreba", a short story by Pavao Pavličić. It was awarded for best screenplay and best actor at the 1983 Fantasporto.

In 1999, a poll of Croatian film critics found it to be one of the best Croatian films ever made.

== Plot ==
Old houses in Zagreb are destroyed in order to build new, bigger blocks. A teacher who lives in one of these houses allows a stranger to share his home with him. The stranger has a fascination with statistics, and claims he can predict crimes based on statistical analyses. When a predicted murder did not occur, the stranger is adamant that the whole town will suffer unless a balance is achieved - and he leaves.

== Cast ==
- Ivica Vidović - Ivica
- Fabijan Šovagović - Fabijan
- Božidarka Frajt - Zdenka
