= Jurica Pavičić =

Croatian journalist and film critic (born 1965)

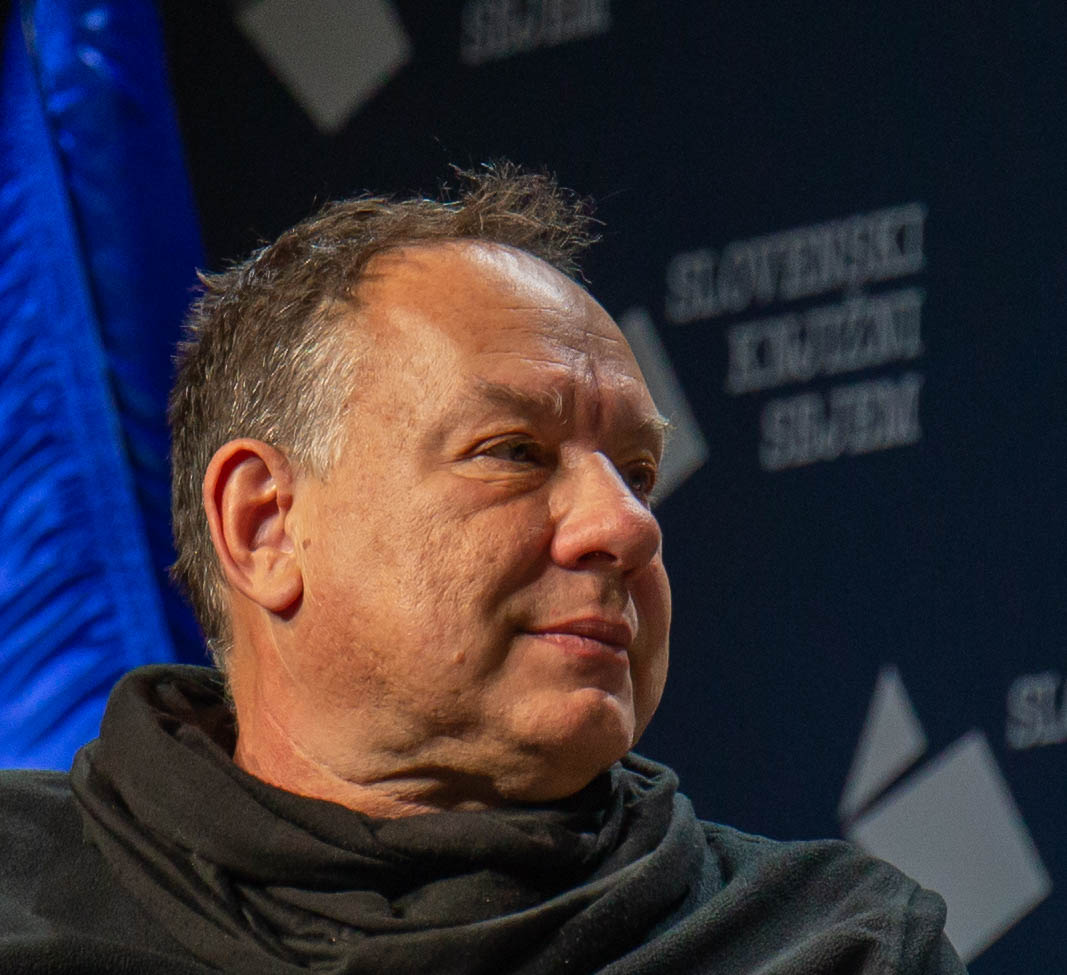
Jurica Pavičić at the 2024 Slovenian Book Fair

Jurica Pavičić (born 2 November 1965) is a Croatian writer, columnist and film critic.

== Biography ==
He was born in Split.

Pavičić's screenplay for Witnesses (Svjedoci), Vinko Brešan's 2003 film, won the Golden Arena for Best Screenplay in the 2003 Pula Film Festival. The screenplay, co-written with Živko Zalar, is based on Pavičić's debut novel Alabaster Sheep (Ovce od gipsa). His novels and short story collections have been translated into English, German, Italian, French and Bulgarian.

Pavičić was, with Nenad Polimac, one of two Croatian film critics who participated in the British Film Institute's Sight & Sound Greatest Films of All Time poll in 2012.

In 2014, Pavičić received the Croatian Journalists' Association's Journalist of the Year Award.

In 2017, Pavičić has signed the Declaration on the Common Language of the Croats, Serbs, Bosniaks and Montenegrins.

== Works ==
=== Novels ===
- Ovce od gipsa (1997)
- Nedjeljni prijatelj (2000)
- Minuta 88 (2002)
- Kuća njene majke (2005)
- Crvenkapica (2006)
- Žena s drugog kata (2015)
- Crvena voda (2017)

=== Plays ===
- Trovačica (2000)

=== Short story collections ===
- Patrola na cesti (2008)
- Brod u dvorištu (2013)
- Skupljač zmija (2019)

=== Non-fiction ===
- Vijesti iz Liliputa (2001)
- Postjugoslavenski film: Stil i ideologija (2011)
- Klasici hrvatskog filma jugoslavenskog razdoblja (2017)
- Knjiga o jugu (2018)
