= The Orchid Villa =

1988 film by Krešo Golik

The Orchid Villa (Vila orhideja) is a Croatian film directed by Krešo Golik. It was released in 1988.
