= Visitors from the Arkana Galaxy =

- The Serbo-Croatian poster for Visitors from the Arkana Galaxy
- Directed by: Dušan Vukotić
- Written by: Miloš Macourek; Dušan Vukotić
- Starring: Žarko Potočnjak; Lucie Zulová; Ksenija Prohaska; Rene Bitorajac; Ljubiša Samardžić
- Cinematography: Jiři Macák
- Edited by: Ivana Kačírková
- Music by: Tomislav Simović
- Production companies: Zagreb Film; Kinematografi; Jadran Film; Filmové Studio Barrandov
- Release date: 2 July 1981
- Running time: 85 minutes
- Countries: Yugoslavia; Czechoslovakia
- Languages: Serbo-Croatian; Czech

Visitors from the Arkana Galaxy (Serbo-Croatian: Gosti iz galaksije, Czech: Monstrum z galaxie Arkana) is a 1981 Yugoslav-Czechoslovak science fiction comedy film directed by Dušan Vukotić.

== Plot ==
Robert is a hotel doorman who is obsessed with science fiction. He plans to write an SF novel about three alien androids—Andra and children Targo and Ulu—who land on Earth coming from an advanced civilisation from the galaxy of Arkana. He is constantly disrupted by his girlfriend Biba and his neighbour Toni, a photographer. One of his colleagues at work tells him he should add a monster to his story, saying it is the only way to attract the readers' attention. Robert decides to partially follow his advice, adding the character of Mumu, a huge alien pet.

One night, Robert hears a woman's voice on a tape recorder, telling him to go to a nearby island. He borrows a boat from his friend Toni and arrives at the island, where he is surprised to find the aliens from his own story. After he returns home, he talks about the events with his psychiatrist. He adds that he discovered he has "tellurgia", an ability to make his thoughts come true; he learned about it when he was a baby wishing for milk, and his father grew breasts in order to feed him. Biba does not believe Robert, so he takes her to the island the following night. There they find the three aliens in their spaceship, which resembles a blue glowing sphere. The aliens observe a sleeping guard and remove his heart. When Robert touches the sphere, it causes an explosion. Andra states that the only solution is to turn back time. Using a device in her belly, she turns time back to the moment before Robert touches the sphere. Andra warns Robert not to touch the sphere, which frightens Biba, so the aliens turn her into a cube. Once back home, she turns back into a human in a state of shock.

As the city finds out about the aliens, a group of scuba divers goes to the island armed with harpoons, but are attacked by Targo, who shoots laser rays from his eyes. This greatly increases the public interest in the aliens—tourists flock en masse to the island, arriving naked to convince the aliens they mean no harm. However, they find the island empty. Toni also stalks Robert and the aliens with a camera, to no avail. Robert is fired from his job, and coming home, he finds the aliens nested there. He is fascinated by Andra and touches her skin, but a jealous Biba bursts into the room, swearing at Andra. Targo places a small Mumu in Biba's bag, which she brings home after dumping Robert in her fury. Back at her home, Mumu grows in size, but while he is actually peaceful, his monstrous appearance frightens Biba's flatmates, who panickedly attack it, only to die from the spray of its poisonous blood. As Mumu makes his way downstairs, he is blinded by the flash of Toni's camera, bursts in on a wedding feast and kills almost all attendees after they try to attack him.

Robert arrives, too late to help, and shrinks Mumu back with a device Andra has given him. Andra again turns back time to just before Biba arrives at Robert's apartment. Biba and Toni enter, only to find the spaceship leaving with Robert and Andra's family for Arkana. Biba calls him over his tape recorder, requesting that he return in time for dinner.

== Cast ==
- Žarko Potočnjak as Robert
- Lucié Žulova as Biba
- Ksenija Prohaska as Andra
- Rene Bitorajac as Targo
- Ljubiša Samardžić as Toni
- Ivana Andrlová as Gabi
- Cvijeta Mesić as Cecille
- Petr Drozda as Mumu

== Reception ==
The film was nominated for the Best Film award and received the Best Screenplay award at the 1984 Fantasporto festival in Portugal.
