= Na istarski način =

Na istarski način is a 1985 Croatian film directed by Vladimir Fulgosi. The film is based on the novel Riva i druži by Milan Rakovac. It was co-written by Milan Rakovac, Kruno Quien, and Vladimir Fulgosi. It explores cultural and personal transformation in post-war Istria.
