= Ivo Brešan =

Croatian and Yugoslav playwright, novelist and screenwriter (1936–2017)

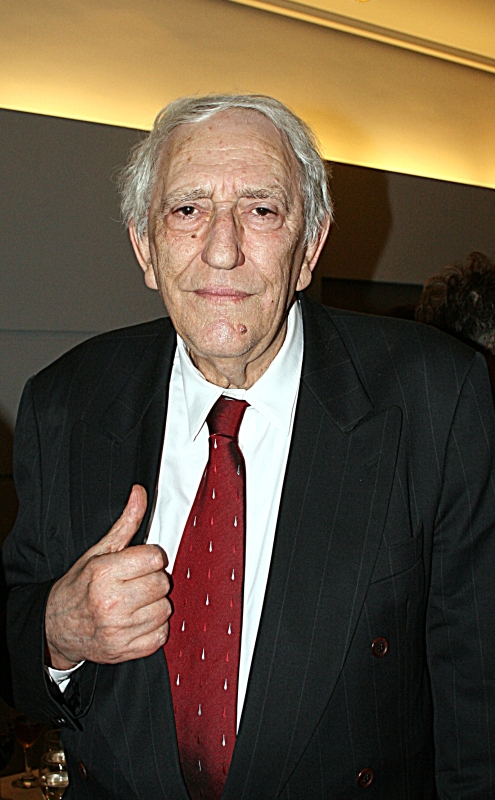
- Brešan at the première of the film Will Not End Here in 2008
- Born: Ivan Brešan; 27 May 1936; Vodice, Yugoslavia
- Died: 3 January 2017 (aged 80); Zagreb, Croatia
- Citizenship: Croatia
- Education: Faculty of Humanities and Social Sciences; University of Zagreb
- Occupations: Playwright; novelist; screenwriter
- Spouse: Jelena Godlar (died 2016)
- Children: Vinko Brešan
- Writing career
- Years active: ?–2016

Ivan "Ivo" Brešan (27 May 1936 – 3 January 2017) was a Croatian and Yugoslav playwright, novelist and screenwriter, known for political satire. His works include screenplays written with his son Vinko.

== Personal life ==
Born in Vodice in 1936, Brešan attended Antun Vrančić High School in Šibenik. He was married to Croatian writer Jelena Godlar, a Jew native to Slavonia. In February 1964, she gave to birth their son Vinko, today a film director. Ivo's wife Jelena died on 20 September 2016. He died after a long and severe illness on 3 January 2017 in Zagreb when he was 80 years of age.

== Screenplays ==
- 1973 – Predstava Hamleta u selu Mrduša Donja
- 1976 – Izbavitelj
- 1980 – The Secret of Nikola Tesla
- 1986 – Obećana zemlja
- 1989 – Donator
- 1996 – How the War Started on My Island
- 2000 – Marshal Tito's Spirit
- 2004 – Libertas
