= Whichever Way the Ball Bounces =

- Directed by: Rajko Grlić
- Written by: Rajko Grlić; Srđan Karanović; Alex Königsmark
- Produced by: Sulejman Kapić
- Starring: Mladen Budiščak; Jagoda Kaloper
- Cinematography: Živko Zalar
- Production company: Jadran Film
- Release date: 1974
- Running time: 89 minutes
- Country: Yugoslavia
- Language: Serbo-Croatian

Whichever Way the Ball Bounces (Croatian: Kud puklo da puklo), also known in English as If It Kills Me, is a 1974 Croatian film directed by Rajko Grlić.
