= The Secret of Nikola Tesla =

- movie poster
- Directed by: Krsto Papić
- Written by: Ivo Brešan; Ivan Kušan; Krsto Papić
- Starring: Petar Božović; Strother Martin; Orson Welles; Dennis Patrick; Oja Kodar; Boris Buzančić
- Cinematography: Ivica Rajković
- Edited by: Boris Erdelji
- Music by: Anđelko Klobučar
- Production company: Zagreb Film
- Release date: 19 February 1980
- Running time: 115 minutes
- Country: Yugoslavia
- Languages: Serbo-Croatian; English

The Secret of Nikola Tesla (Serbo-Croatian: Tajna Nikole Tesle), is a 1980 Yugoslav biographical film which dramatizes events in the life of the Serbian-American engineer and inventor Nikola Tesla. This somewhat fictionalized portrayal of Tesla's life has him contending with Thomas Edison and J.P. Morgan in his attempts to develop alternating current and then "free" wireless power.

== Plot ==
Tesla in a hotel room in 1943 talks to a reporter. He then reminisces about how things would be different if J. P Morgan had listened to him.

Tesla arrives in the US in the 1880s. He tries to convince his new employer, Thomas Edison, to adopt his newly invented electric induction motor running on an alternating current (AC) system but Edison claims direct current (DC) is better and turns him down. Robert Underwood Johnson and his wife Katharine, who were at the meeting, later find Tesla digging a ditch, having quit his job at Edison. Tesla strikes a business deal with two investors to finance development of his motor. He shows off his AC system at meeting of the American Institute of Electrical Engineers but Edison, in the audience, claims it is impractical. After the reporters, and even Tesla's own investors, walk away George Westinghouse convinces Tesla to sell him his AC patents and offers a contract to pay Tesla a royalty on his motor design. They end up in a public battle with Edison trying to demonstrate their system is not dangerous (as Edison claims) and is actually better than DC. J.P. Morgan, pulling the strings in the background, calls Tesla and Edison into a meeting and, unhappy with Edison's progress electrifying his factories, tells Tesla he can try to prove AC would work better.

At a banquet celebrating the building of an alternating current power plant at Niagara Falls Tesla confuses the audience with his futuristic ideas about his high frequency wireless AC transmission system and then tells someone he is off to Europe to see his family (who he has been having flashbacks about). On that trip, he visits his bed-ridden mother, who dies in his arms. He then wanders out in the country side having flash backs about his childhood and the death of his brother, all punctuated by visions of falling water and lightning. Westinghouse and Katharine visit Tesla back at his New York lab where the inventor tears up his royalty contract to save Westinghouse from financial ruin. Tesla goes on to develop his wireless power system, making several reports to Morgan on his progress. Morgan tells Tesla he is unhappy with wild stories about the inventor but keeps backing him.

Westinghouse warns Tesla (who is now building his Morgan financed Wardenclyffe wireless power station) to watch out for Morgan's motives and Katharine tells the inventor how she wished they could have had more of a relationship together. Tesla learns from Morgan that Guglielmo Marconi has stolen his wireless patents and that Albert Einstein has new theories about matter and energy. Tesla tells Morgan these new theories are a "crime against nature" and tries to get Morgan to back his free wireless power system before it is too late. After Tesla leaves Morgan says he won't back a system that would put him out of business and orders all further interaction with Tesla cut off. Tesla looks over his demolished Wardenclyffe station and complains, at the end of his life in a world choked with smog, that he wished Morgan had listened to him.

== Cast ==
- Petar Božović as Nikola Tesla
- Strother Martin as George Westinghouse
- Orson Welles as J. P. Morgan
- Dennis Patrick as Thomas Edison
- Oja Kodar as Katharine Johnson
- Boris Buzančić as Robert Underwood Johnson
- Charles Millot as "Adams" (Edward Dean Adams)
- Igor Galo as Guglielmo Marconi
- Vanja Drach as Mark Twain

== Production ==
The film was shot in the former Yugoslavia. Besides lead Yugoslavian actor Petar Božović, director Krsto Papić assembled a cast which includes three American actors playing iconic personalities of 19th and early 20th century America, Orson Welles as Morgan, Strother Martin (who died six weeks before the film's premiere) as Westinghouse, and Dennis Patrick as Edison. Croatian actress Oja Kodar, playing Katharine, had been Welles' companion for almost two decades at the time of filming.

The film was written by Ivo Brešan, Ivan Kušan, and Krsto Papic. Two American writers contributed to the screenplay and are cited with on-screen credits. They are John W. English, University of Georgia journalism professor, and Dee Brown, author of Bury My Heart at Wounded Knee. They were commissioned by Zagreb Film Studio director and pre-production coordinator Zelimir Matko.

== Release ==
The film was premiered in Yugoslavia on Tesla Day, July 10, 1980. The film had a further September 12, 1980 English-language premiere at the Toronto International Film Festival and had a small US theatrical run in 1985.

=== Critical reception ===
Online reviewers note the accurate portrayal of period settings and costumes and thought the major interest for most audiences would be the portrayal of Morgan by Orson Welles. The low production values, continual switching between Serbo-Croatian and poorly dubbed English, and flashbacks buried within further flashbacks were found distracting. It is noted to play like a history lesson instead of a study of Nikola Tesla's character. A 3 Quarks Daily commentator thought the conspiracy plot of a "messianic wizard" vs the "capitalist baddies" was campy.

=== Awards ===
- Yugoslav Feature Film Festival in Pula, 1980 – Grand Silver
