= Bloodsuckers (1989 film) =

1989 Croatian vampire film by Dejan Šorak

- Film poster
- Croatian: Krvopijci
- Directed by: Dejan Šorak
- Written by: Dejan Šorak
- Starring: Semka Sokolović-Bertok; Danko Ljuština; Maro Martinović; Danilo Lazović; Ksenija Marinković; Zvonimir Torjanac; Zlatko Vitez; Ranko Zidarić
- Cinematography: Goran Trbuljak
- Edited by: Vesna Lažeta
- Music by: Kornelije Kovač
- Production company: Jadran Film
- Release date: 20 July 1989
- Running time: 86 minutes
- Country: Croatia

Bloodsuckers (Krvopijci) is a 1989 Croatian vampire comedy horror film directed by Dejan Šorak. The film was archived by the Croatian State Archives. Bloodsuckers was poorly received by critics and at the box office at the time of its release, but has garnered a following. It is also remembered for the film debut of Ksenija Marinković. Photographed by artist Goran Trbuljak, most of the film was shot on Zagreb's Gornji Grad to achieve a Gothic visual style.

== Plot ==
The streets of Zagreb at night are deserted due to a serial rapist also reputed to be a vampire. One evening, Teobold Majer (Maro Martinović) visits Dr Franz Glogowecz (Danilo Lazović) in the psychiatrist's isolated Gornji Grad villa. Teobold claims to be a 16th-century vampire, desiring the services of Glogowecz, whom he reputes to stem from a long line of vampire hunters. Franz is nonplussed, ordering him to leave. However, his young wife Barbara (Ksenija Marinković) is attracted to the young man. She follows him and catches him at the altar of Stone Gate of Gornji Grad, where he bites her neck, leaving the telltale mark of vampire fangs. Despite having held a séance and professing to be a witch earlier that evening, Barbara is greatly amused and invites Teobold to visit her at the villa once her husband has fallen asleep. On her way back, Barbara is followed by a man whom she maces, thinking he is the rapist, before realising he is Franz.

Meanwhile, the Glogowecz villa is visited by Franz's estranged uncle Jambrek Glogowecz (Zvonimir Torjanac) and Jambrek's dimwitted son Jurek (Danko Ljuština). Jambrek also happens to be a lover from the youth of housemaid Jalža (Semka Sokolović-Bertok), who agrees to secretly let them in. During the night, Teobold makes an entrance at what he presumes is Barbara's bedroom window, but ends up in an altercation with Jurek, who mistakes him for Krampus, tearing a piece of his cloak. As Franz discovers the guests and identifies the torn piece as Teobold's clothing, the arrival of relatives he never knew he had, coupled with Barbara's evasiveness about her neck wound and Teobold's window appearance, begins to sway his skepticism of vampires.

The next day, while Barbara is taking Jambrek and Jurek to the Zagreb Zoo, Franz takes the cloth to his friend, a chemistry professor, who identifies it as very old wool. He investigates his family history at the library, learning that seven of his ancestors were staked as vampires in the 16th century, along with a woman named Barbara who was burnt as a witch – the events were officiated by a Teobold Majer. This thoroughly convinces Franz that Teobold was telling the truth all along. He shares his thoughts with his family: Barbara remains skeptical, but Jambrek and Jurek help him in preparations to destroy the vampire.

At night, Franz breaks into the Zagreb Botanical Garden to procure a hawthorn bush to make a stake (glogov kolac). There, he is nearly arrested by a policeman. The following day, Jambrek issues a newspaper ad offering vampire killing services. This brings Franz's vampire hunt to the attention of police inspector Brodski (Ranko Zidarić) and healer Bjelinski (Zlatko Vitez), who cryptically offers him his support.

In the evening, a young woman (Asja Potočnjak) answers the ad. Displaying a neck wound similar to Barbara's, she tells the Glogoweczs of a purported vampire, a Mr Drakulić (Ilija Ivezić), giving them the directions to his grave at Mirogoj Cemetery. In exchange for 2000 German marks, a hefty sum, the Glogoweczs agree to take on the assignment. While skeptical Barbara intends to pocket the money, Jambrek brandishes a real hawthorne stake and hammer, proud family keepsakes. Franz orders the group into the car and to the locked cemetery. Barbara acts as the lookout as the others begin to dig up Drakulić's grave. Accosted by Teobold who wanders the cemetery at night, she spots a group of people headed for Drakulić's grave just as the Glogoweczs are about to open the casket. Jambrek and Jurek flee in fear of law. Startled by the 20-year-old cadaver's lively appearance, Franz, a true believer in vampires, decides to remain behind to stake the body. He is stopped by the young woman and Inspector Brodski, who reveals that this was a sting operation. A dispirited Franz is taken to the Jankomir Psychiatric Hospital.

However, Franz is soon released. In his villa, he finds Brodski and Bjelinski, who apologise to him for his committal, and, to Franz's surprise, proclaim that there may be something to his story after all. The film ends with a surprised Teobold Majer running into Drakulić, who is also stalking the nighttime streets of Gornji Grad.

== Cast ==
- Danilo Lazović as Dr. Franz Glogowecz
- Ksenija Marinković as Barbara Glogowecz
- Maro Martinović as Teobold Majer
- Semka Sokolović-Bertok as Jalža
- Zvonimir Torjanac as Jambrek Glogowecz
- Danko Ljuština as Jurek Glogowecz
- Ranko Zidarić as Inspector Stjepan Brodski
- Zlatko Vitez as Bjelinski
- Asja Potočnjak as unknown woman
- Vitomira Lončar as librarian
- Zvonko Strmac as psychiatrist
- Branko Bonači as chemistry professor
- Krešimir Zidarić as policeman in the Botanical Garden
- Vladimir Obleščuk as policeman
- Ilija Ivezić as Drakulić
- Hermina Pipinić as Tamara Baumfeld
- Lena Politeo as secretary
