= Dreaming the Rose =

Dreaming the Rose (San o ruži) is a 1986 Croatian film directed by Zoran Tadić, based on a screenplay by Pavao Pavličić.

== Cast ==
- Rade Šerbedžija – Valent
- Fabijan Šovagović – Laci
- Iva Marjanović – Ljuba
- Ljubo Zecević – Zeljac
- Anja Šovagović-Despot – Jasna
- Vedran Psenicnik – Tomica
- Mario Vuk – Mali
- Vlatko Dulić – Car
- Ljubo Kapor – Vukovic
- Franjo Majetić – Susjed
- Zdenka Hersak – Milostiva
- Ivo Fici – Istrazitelj
- Tomislav Gotovać – Krcmar
- Toso Jelić – Gospon
