= King's Endgame =

1987 film

- Kraljeva završnica
- Directed by: Živorad Tomić
- Written by: Nebojsa Pajkic, Zivorad Tomic
- Produced by: Boris Gabela
- Starring: Irfan Mensur, Ena Begović, Vladislava Milosavljević
- Cinematography: Boris Turković
- Edited by: Zoltan Wagner
- Music by: Vuk Kulenović
- Release date: 1987
- Running time: 97 minutes
- Country: Yugoslavia
- Language: Serbo-Croatian

King's Endgame (Kraljeva završnica) is a 1987 Croatian film directed by Živorad Tomić.

== Cast ==
- Irfan Mensur - Branko Kralj
- Ena Begović - Višnja Kralj
- Vladislava Milosavljević - Irena
- Milan Štrljić - Inspektor
- Bogdan Diklić - Božo
- Ivo Gregurević - Prodavac pića u vozu
- Zdenko Jelčić - Kondukter
- Vlatko Dulić - Konobar
- Zvonimir Torjanac - Psihijatar
- Mirjana Majurec - Sekretarica
- Franjo Majetić - Prvi šahista
- Ivo Fici - Drugi šahista
- Ilija Ivezić - Temelj
