= Nemir =

Nemir is both a given name and a surname. It may refer to:

- Edgar Nemir (1919–1969), American sport wrestler
- Nemir Kirdar, Iraqi businessman
- Nemir Matos-Cintrón (born 1949), Puerto Rican writer and poet

== See also ==
- Nemir (film), 1982 Croatian film
