= Violet (1978 film) =

Violet (Ljubica) is a 1978 Croatian film directed by Krešo Golik, starring Božidarka Frajt and Ivan Piko Stančić.
