= Slavko Brankov =

Croatian actor (1951–2006)

- Славко Бранков
- Born: 19 May 1951; Varaždin, PR Croatia, FPR Yugoslavia
- Died: 9 August 2006 (aged 55); Zagreb, Croatia
- Occupation: Actor
- Years active: 1975–2006
- Spouse: Marina Nemet (m. 1984–2004)
- Children: 1

Slavko Brankov (Serbian Cyrillic: Славко Бранков; 19 May 1951 – 9 August 2006) was a Croatian film, theatre and television actor of Serb descent.

== Career ==
He graduated at the Zagreb Academy of Dramatic Art in 1976. In 1971, he started his acting career in one of Zagreb's most popular theaters, "Gavella". As result of his acting career, in 1992 he was awarded the Vladimir Nazor Award for a role of Calogiero di Spelta in the drama "Velika Magija". He was also awarded the Croatian Radio Television Award for playing the character of "Crni Džek" (Black Jack) in Smogovci, a highly popular children's TV series. He also had small roles in Croatian films like Ajmo žuti (Go, Yellow, 2001).

== Personal life ==
After the end of his marriage to actress Marina Nemet, Brankov indulged in an affair with a young girl, with whom he stayed until his death. Brankov died of a malignant disease that was treated at the Clinic for Lung Diseases in Zagreb.
