= Vinko Brešan =

Croatian film director

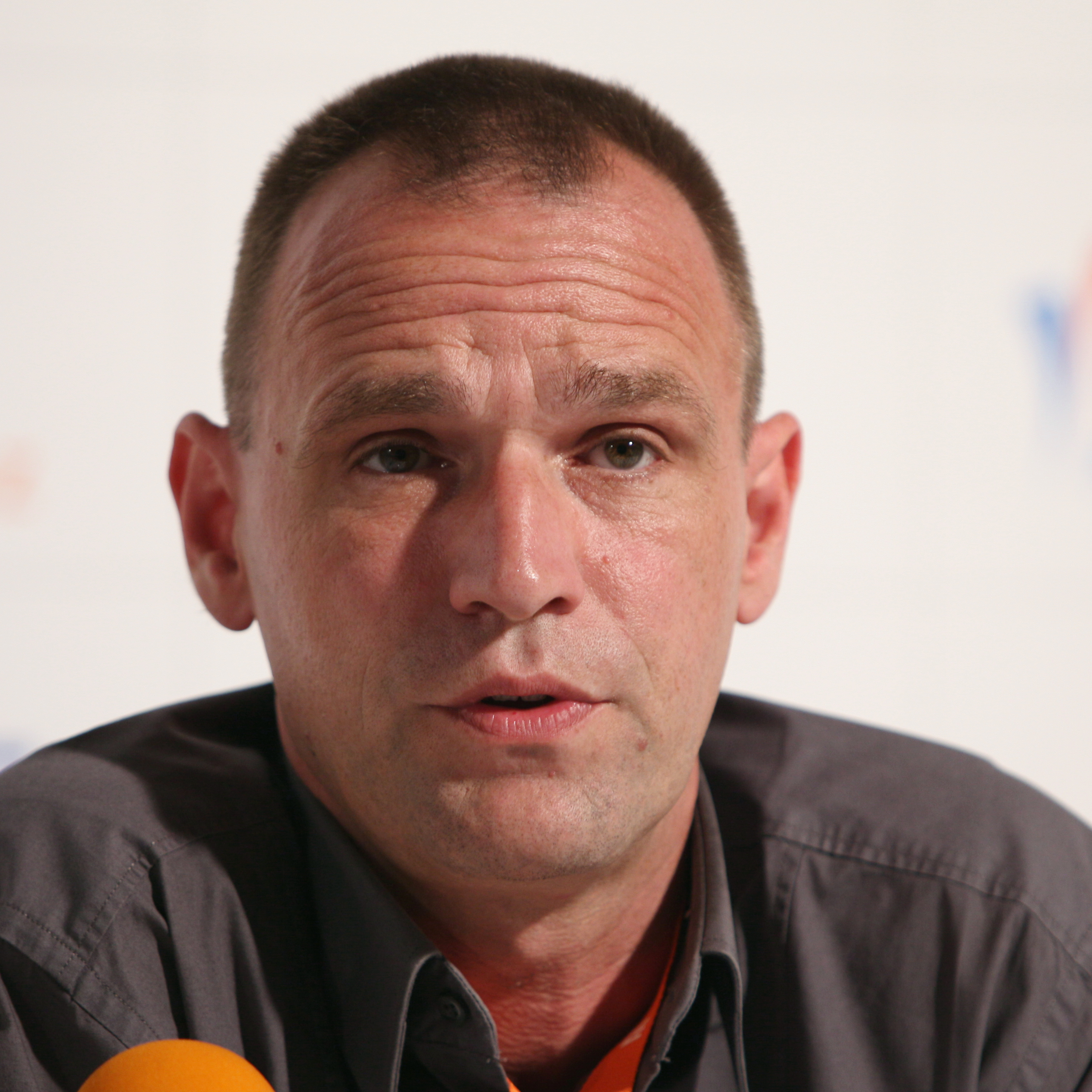
- Brešan at 2009 KVIFF
- Born: 3 February 1964 (age 62); Zagreb, SR Croatia, Yugoslavia
- Occupation: Film director
- Years active: 1994–present
- Spouse: Sandra Botica
- Children: 2
- Relatives: Ivo Brešan (father); Jelena Godlar-Brešan (mother)

Vinko Brešan (Croatian pronunciation: [ʋîːŋko brěʃan]; born 3 February 1964) is a Croatian film director best known for directing several notable Croatian black comedies.

Brešan emerged into prominence in Croatia and abroad with three critically acclaimed and award-winning films that, each in its own way, broke some of the perceived taboos of Croatian cinema in the 1990s.

== Life and career ==
Brešan was born in Zagreb to a mother, writer Jelena Godlar-Brešan, who was of part Jewish descent, and famous playwright and screenwriter Ivo Brešan. He studied philosophy and comparative literature at the University of Zagreb, as well as Film and Television Direction at the university's Academy of Dramatic Arts. As a student, he was awarded the Oberhausen debutant prize for his short film Naša burza ("Our Stock Exchange") in 1988.

In 1994 and 1995, Brešan was awarded the Oktavijan prize at the Days of Croatian Film Festival for Zajednički ručak ("Lunch Together") and Hodnik ("The Corridor") respectively.

His first feature-length film Kako je počeo rat na mom otoku ("How the War Started on My Island"), is a humorous microcosmic take on the Yugoslav Wars set in the Dalmatian Adriatic. The film was awarded the Velika zlatna arena ("Grand Golden Arena") for cinematography at the Pula Film Festival and the Grand Prize at the 1997 Cottbus Film Festival of Young East European Cinema. It proved to be a tremendous commercial success as well, beating Independence Day at the Croatian box office in 1996 with over 300,000 viewers, and was screened at 32 international film festivals, including Toronto and Montreal. It also marked a very successful collaboration with his father on the screenplay of the film.

Brešan achieved similar international and domestic success with his 1999 black comedy Marshal Tito's Spirit, a satirical look at how unrepentant communists and new capitalists react to the reported appearance of the ghost of Marshal Tito on their small Adriatic island. It was awarded the Wolfgang Staudte Prize and received Special Mention from the Reader Jury of the Berliner Zeitung at the Berlin International Film Festival in 2000. Brešan also won Best Director at the Karlovy Vary International Film Festival for the film in the same year. Maršal, like its predecessor, was scripted in collaboration with Brešan's playwright father, Ivo, and also became a Croatian box office hit.

Perhaps the most controversial part of Brešan's opus to date is the 2003 war drama Svjedoci ("Witnesses"), based on the novel Ovce od gipsa ("Alabaster Sheep") by Jurica Pavičić. Reminiscent of Akira Kurosawa's Rashomon, it explores the human complexities and moral murkiness of war through multiple perspectives and flashbacks surrounding the unintended murder of an alleged Serb smuggler by three Croatian soldiers returning from the front in Karlovac. The film was nominated for the Golden Bear at the 2004 Berlinale and received the Peace Film Award as well as a Special Mention from the Ecumenical Jury. It also won the Philip Morris Award at Karlovy Vary in the same year. Notably, Serbian actress Mirjana Karanović was cast in the role of a Croatian war widow—a decision Brešan had to defend as the film drew protests from the Croatian Party of Rights and right-wing sections of the Croatian public.

Vinko Brešan is married to his editor Sandra Botica, with whom he has two sons - Ivan (born 1996) and Niko (born 2000).

He was appointed Director of Zagreb Film in December 2004.

== Filmography ==
- How the War Started on My Island (Kako je počeo rat na mom otoku, 1996)
- Marshal Tito's Spirit (Maršal, 2000)
- Witnesses (Svjedoci, 2003)
- Will Not End Here (Nije kraj, 2008)
- The Priest's Children (Svećenikova djeca, 2013)
- What a Country! (Koja je ovo država, 2018)
