= Lost Homeland =

1980 Croatian film

Lost Homeland (Croatian: Izgubljeni zavičaj) is a 1980 Croatian film directed by Ante Babaja. It is based on Slobodan Novak's novel of the same name.

In 1999, a poll of Croatian film critics found it to be one of the best Croatian films ever made.
