= Dina Iordanova =

British academic

- Дина Йорданова
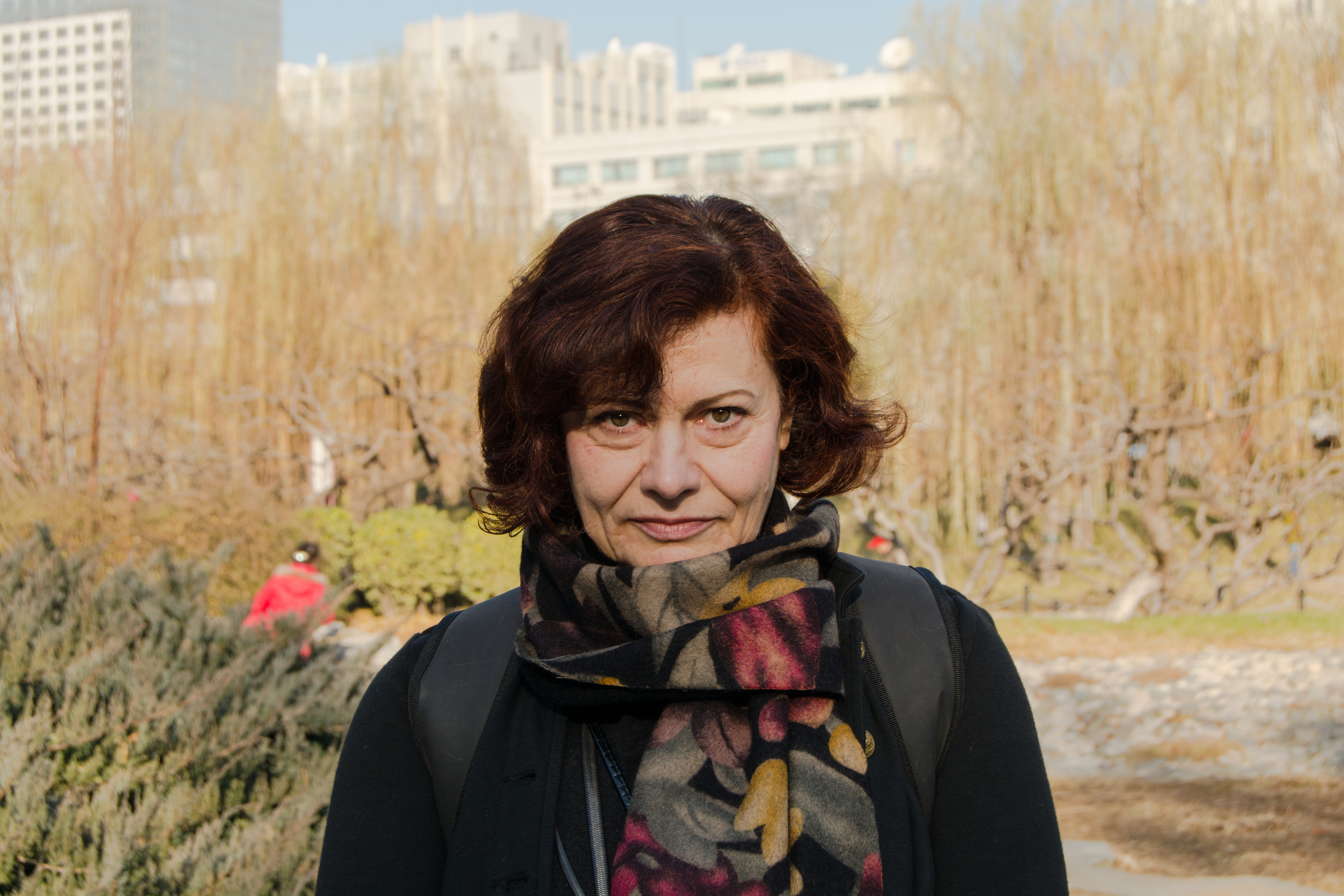
- Dina in 2019
- Born: May 1, 1960 (age 65); Sofia, Bulgaria
- Education: Sofia University
- Occupation: Film Academic
- Years active: 1986–present

Dina Iordanova (born 1960) is an educationalist and Professor of Film Studies at the University of St. Andrews. A specialist in world cinema, her special expertise is in the cinema of the Balkans, Eastern Europe, and Europe in general. Her research approaches cinema on a meta-national level and focuses on the dynamics of transnational film; she has special interest in issues related to cinema at the periphery and in alternative historiography. She has published extensively on international and transnational film art and film industry, and convenes research networks on film festivals and on the Dynamics of World Cinema, with funding from the Leverhulme Trust.

== Early life ==
Born in an intellectual family in communist Bulgaria, she read Philosophy and German and obtained her doctorate under the guidance of Prof. Isaac Passy in Aesthetics and cultural history at Kliment Okhridski University in Sofia, in 1986. She worked at the Institute for Cultural Studies before emigrating to Canada in 1990. In emigration Iordanova lived and worked in Canada and the US, later on settling in the UK in 1998 and becoming actively engaged in European networks and projects.

== Career ==
Prior to her arrival at St. Andrews, she held positions at the Radio-TV-Film department at the University of Texas at Austin, a Rockefeller Fellowship at the Franke Institute for the Humanities at the University of Chicago, and at the University of Leicester in England. Her work is reviewed widely, translated in over fifteen languages and adopted for use in courses at over seventy Universities internationally. She has been a guest professor at the University of Chicago, and served as distinguished visiting professor at Queen Mary, University of London.

Iordanova created the Film Studies programme at the University of St. Andrews, where she was appointed to the first Chair in Film in 2004 and engaged in a wide-ranging effort to modernize the university's portfolio, bringing the programme to an internationally respected status within a short time. She also founded the Centre for Film Studies, which she currently directs and was behind the Carnegie Trust for the Universities of Scotland-funded initiative of the Scottish Consortium of Film and Visual Studies.

In 2010-2012 Iordanova served as Provost of St Leonard's College (University of St Andrews).

== Works ==
Her book Cinema of Flames reviewed in over thirty journals, including Kinoeye, Screening the Past, Post Script, Europe-Asia Studies, and has been extensively discussed in various scholarly contexts. Cinema of the Other Europe, the 2003 monograph on the cinemas of Central Europe, was reviewed in Screening the Past, Film Quarterly, Kinema, and a range of other print journals. She has published monographs on director Emir Kusturica, and on the Cinema of Bulgaria. Her work on transnational cinema includes the volume Cinema at the Periphery, work related to the representation of Romanies in international film, as well as on the representation of human trafficking and other current social problems.

Since 2009 she has been publishing the series of Film Festival Yearbooks, which includes volumes on The Festival Circuit (with Ragan Rhyne), Film Festivals and Imagined Communities (with Ruby Cheung).

She writes the blog DinaView on topics related to world cinema, culture, technology and investing.

== Bibliography ==
- Cinemas of Paris, (with Jean-Michel Frodon), St Andrews Film Studies, 2015. Cinémas de Paris, (with Jean-Michel Frodon), French translation CNRS Editions, 2017.
- Film Festival Yearbook 6: Film Festivals and the Middle East, St Andrews Film Studies, 2014.
- Film Festival Reader, St Andrews Film Studies, 2013.
- Digital Disruption: Cinema Moves Online, (with Stuart Cunningham), St Andrews Film Studies, 2012.
- Film Festival Yearbook 4: Film Festivals and Activism, (with Leshu Torchin), St Andrews Film Studies, 2012.
- Film Festival Yearbook 3: Film Festivals in East Asia, (with Ruby Cheung), St Andrews Film Studies, 2011.
- Cinema at the Periphery, (with David Martin-Jones and Belen Vidal), WSUP, 2010.
- Moving People, Moving Images: Cinema and Trafficking in the New Europe, (with William Brown and Leshu Torchin), StAFS, 2010.
- Film Festival Yearbook 2: Film Festivals and Imagined Communities, (with R. Cheung), StAFS, 2010.
- Film Festival Yearbook 1: The Festival Circuit, (with R. Rhyne), StAFS, 2009.
- Special Issue on Film Festivals, guest editor for Film International, Vol. 6, Issue 4, Nr. 34, 2008.
- Special issue of Third Text: "Picturing 'Gypsies': Interdisciplinary Approaches to Roma Representation, guest editor for Vol. 22, Issue 3, May 2008.
- Budding Channels of Peripheral Cinema, Blurb 2008.
- New Bulgarian Cinema, College Gate Press, 2008.
- Contemporary Balkan Cinema, supplement to Cineaste, Summer 2007.
- Indian Cinema Abroad: Transnational Historiography of Cinematic Exchanges, special issue of South Asian Popular Culture Studies, October 2006.
- Cinema of the Balkans, Wallflower, 2006.
- Cinema of the Other Europe: The Industry and Artistry of East Central European Film, Wallflower, 2003
- Romanies in International Cinema, Special issue of Framework, 44.2 Fall 2003.
- Emir Kusturica, BFI, 2002
- Cinema of Flames: Balkan Film, Culture and the Media, BFI, 2001
- Balkan Sinemasi Turkish translation of Cinema of Flames, Istanbul, Agora, 2013.
- BFI's Companion of East European and Russian Cinema, BFI, 2000.
