= Southbound Train =

Southbound Train (Croatian: Vlakom prema jugu) is a 1981 Croatian comedy-drama film directed by Petar Krelja, starring Marina Nemet, Zlatko Vitez, and Franjo Majetić.

== Sources ==
- Vlakom prema jugu at lzmk.hr (in Croatian)
- Vlakom prema jugu at hrfilm.hr (in Croatian)
