= The Third Woman =

The Third Woman (Treća žena) is a 1997 Croatian film directed by Zoran Tadić.
