= Dejan Šorak =

Croatian film director and screenwriter (born 1954)

Dejan Šorak (born 29 March 1954 in Karlovac) is a Croatian film director and screenwriter.

== Filmography ==
- Mala pljačka vlaka (1984)
- Officer with a Rose (1987)
- Najbolji (1989)
- Krvopijci (1989)
- The Time of Warriors (1991)
- Garcia (1999)
- Two Players from the Bench (2005)
- U zemlji čudesa (2009)

== Sources ==
- Dejan Šorak at hrfilm.hr (in Croatian)
