= The Small Train Robbery =

The Small Train Robbery (Mala pljačka vlaka) is a Yugoslavian film, a western parody directed by Dejan Šorak and starring Bata Živojinović, Miodrag Krivokapić and Mustafa Nadarević. It was released in 1984.

It reflects to Edwin S. Porter's notable film: The Great Train Robbery.
