= Marjuca or Death =

1987 film by Vanča Kljaković

Marjuca or Death (Marjuča ili smrt) is a 1987 Croatian film directed by Vanča Kljaković.

== Premise ==
The film revolves around "the sexual awakening of a boy in a Split brothel".

== Cast ==
- Mirjana Karanović
- Neda Arnerić
- Boris Dvornik

== Reception ==
The film was presented as dedicated to the director's native Split, and "an autobiography about his wartime childhood in Split, about the awakening of hormones, the discovery of eroticism".; and as "tell[ing] stories of sexual initiations, of sentimental involvements against the imprecise and patinated backdrop of the occupation and liberation of the country".
