= Lordan Zafranović =

Croatian-Czech film director

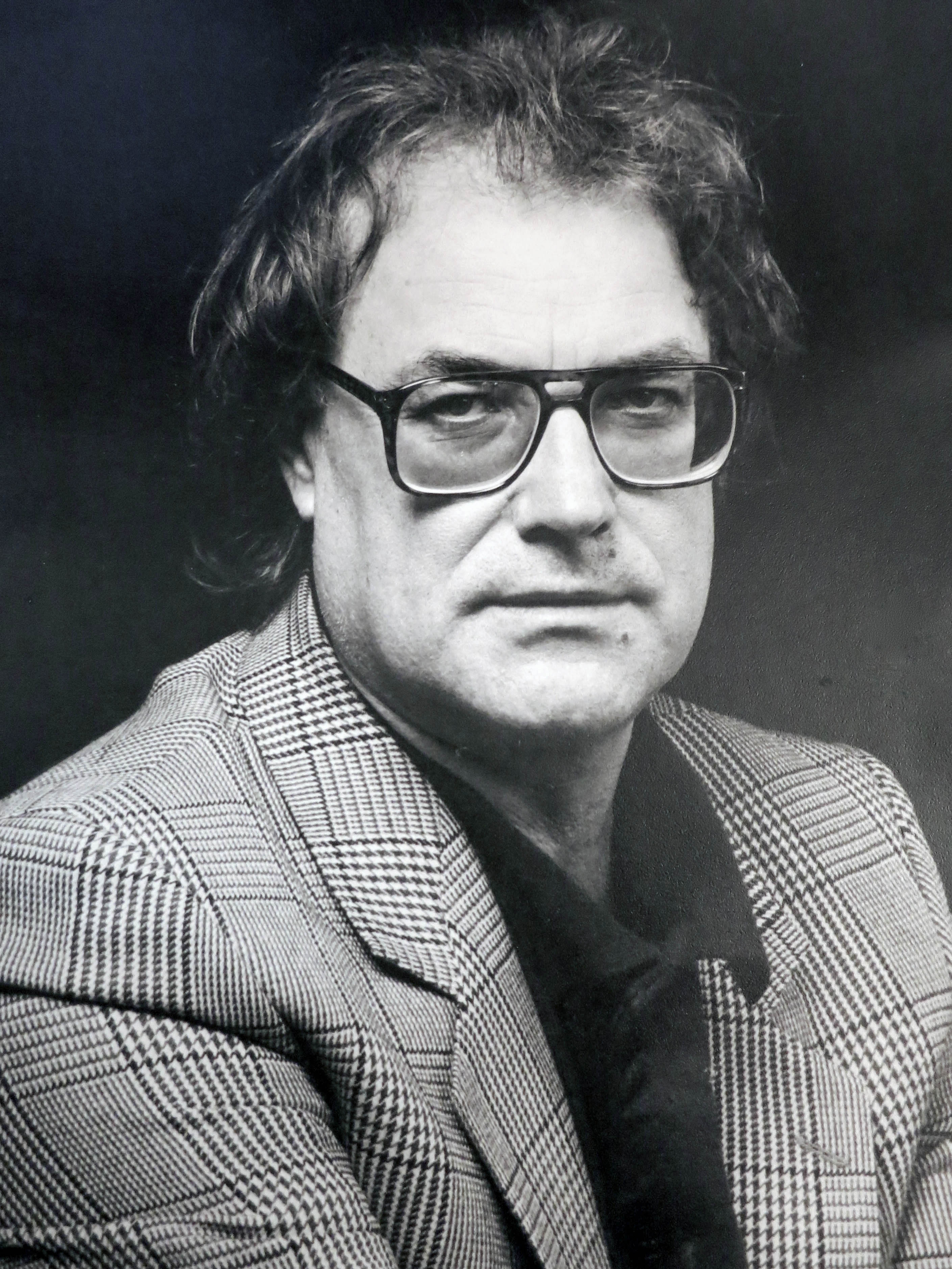
- Lordan Zafranović in the 1980s.
- Born: 11 February 1944 (age 82); Maslinica, Croatia
- Years active: 1961–present
- Awards: Big Golden Arena for Best Film; 1978 Occupation in 26 Pictures; 1981 The Fall of Italy; Golden Arena for Best Director; 1981 The Fall of Italy; 1986 Evening Bells

Lordan Zafranović (born 11 February 1944) is a Croatian and Yugoslav film director known for his World War II trilogy consisting of Occupation in 26 Pictures (1978), The Fall of Italy (1981), and Evening Bells (1986), all co-written with Mirko Kovač, for his experimental black and white early work, which mark him as a major figure of the Yugoslav Black Wave, and for his dauntless exploration of Ustaše crimes during the NDH period.

== Early life ==
Lordan Zafranović was born in 1944 in Maslinica, island of Šolta, in Axis-occupied Yugoslavia. He spent the first two years of his life in the El Shatt refugee camp together with his mother Marija and his elder brother Zdenko. After the war, the family reunited with father Ivan and moved to Split, where younger brother Andrija was born. He graduated in ship-engineering from the Split Marine School in 1962 and continued with studies in literature and fine arts at the Split Pedagogical Academy (later University of Split) from 1963 to 1967.

== Work ==
Lordan Zafranović started his film career as an amateur at Kino klub Split in 1961, at age 15. From 1965 onwards, he worked as a professional for Zagreb film, as an assistant to director Vatroslav Mimica, and as one of the founders, and first author, of the legendary Zagreb Film Authors' Studio (FAS). He was awarded Master of International Amateur Film in 1966. When in the following year, he was awarded a scholarship at the FAMU, he was already a mature author with festival experience and awards, namely for his seminal experimental short Poslije podne (Puška) (1968). At FAMU, Zafranović graduated in film directing as a master student of Academy Award winner Elmar Klos in 1971.

Zafranović is the eldest of the five acclaimed Yugoslav directors labelled by critics as The Prague film school (Praška filmska škola), despite their very different aesthetics and interests. As they themselves have repeatedly pointed out, nothing unites these five but the fact that they were peers at FAMU around 1968, and that they remained friends thereafter. Still, they stand out as a generation of new talents emerging after the blank the purges of the first half of the 1970s had caused in Yugoslav cinematography.

Lordan Zafranović's first three feature films Sunday (1969, starring Goran Marković), Dalmatian Chronicle (1973), and Passion According to Matthew (1975), met with restraint in the oppressed atmosphere following the end of the Croatian Spring. In 1973, he left Zagreb for Belgrade, where he became part of a writers' circle including, among others, Filip David, Danilo Kiš, and Mirko Kovač (writer). If his 1975 feature Passion According to Matthew was already a collaboration with Kovač, the two met with international success with their 1978 cult film Occupation in 26 Pictures. This box office hit in Yugoslavia, Czechoslovakia, France, and beyond reinvented the genre of the Yugoslav Partisan film with its lush Mediterranean setting of Dubrovnik and its aesthetics, contrasting the happiness of an affluent aristocratic family and her friends with the arrival of evil, through fascist occupation and violence, and the collapse of morale and society. It was awarded the Big Golden Arena for Best Picture at the Pula Film Festival, nominated for the Cannes Film Festival and submitted as Yugoslavia's entry for the Academy Awards. In Hollywood, the film was regarded as a favourite, if only the director agreed to shorten the scene of a brutal massacre in a bus, the climax of the film. Zafranović declined. He continued his WWII trilogy with The Fall of Italy (1981), set in his native island Šolta during the Italian occupation, which revolves around the rise and fall of a young Partisan officer who is corrupted by power, and Evening Bells (1986), also co-written with Mirko Kovač, which tells the life of a village lad (played by Rade Šerbedžija) who went to the city and became a Partisan, and who then ended up first in internment in Nazi Germany and second, after the Tito-Stalin split in 1948, in a Yugoslav prison. The Fall of Italy won him the Big Golden Arena for the second time, Evening Bells the Golden Arena for Best Director at the Pula Film Festival. In the mid-1980s Zafranović returned to more intimate themes, with films such as An Angel's Bite (1984) and Aloa: Festivity of the Whores (1988), notable for their psychological drama and erotics. He also directed numerous TV productions for Radio Television Belgrade and Radio Television Zagreb.

In his long and productive career, Zafranović succeeded in realizing his films according to his creative vision and professional ethos, against all odds. His FAMU peer Rajko Grlić calls him "one of the biggest talents of Croatian film, one of the rare directors with a 'feeling for film', with what in the field of music is called the absolute pitch". Others have praised him as "one of the great masters of modernism" (Dina Iordanova), "one of the great masters of Yugoslav film", and "a Mediterranean classic whose films can be compared with those by Angelopoulos, Bertolucci or Liliana Cavani" (Ranko Munitić). If his enemies denounced him as a "regime's director" indulging in "manierism" (Nenad Polimac), Grlić sees him as "the only Croat director whose films have grown organically from the Mediterranean iconography - from that sun, salt, poverty, sweetish baroque catholic kitsch, and the bitter world of black and red ideologies". British-Bulgarian film researcher Dina Iordanova asserts that his "main occupation has been to explore the pressures experienced by ordinary people under extreme historical circumstances. His films challenge the deepest foundations of nationalism and question the justification of historical violence." As is the case with other Yugoslav directors, namely Dušan Makavejev or Želimir Žilnik, Zafranović's films often caused controversy. This culminated in his occupation with the crimes of the NDH and the Ustaše during World War II and his documentaries Jasenovac: The Cruelest Death Camp of All Times (1983) and Decline of the Century: The Testament of L.Z. (1993) about the war crimes trial against NDH Minister of Interior Andrija Artuković. According to director Jasna Nanut, Zafranović's work as a whole awaits critical valorization as "an indispensable and essential part of Croat cinematography."

== Exile and return to Croatia ==
Shortly before the break-up of Yugoslavia in 1991, Zafranović joined the Central Committee of the League of Communists of Croatia in 1989 for a short period. Franjo Tuđman, the future first President of the Republic of Croatia, attacked him because of his movie Jasenovac: The Cruelest Death Camp of All Times (Krv i pepeo Jasenovca, 1985). Soon after Croatia's Declaration of Independence, Tuđman denounced him as an "Enemy of the Croatian people". Zafranović was forced to leave the country. He took along his film on Artuković, which he finished in exile as a personal account on the reemergence of fascist ideology and violence in Croatia: His Decline of the Century: The Testament of L.Z. (1993) is, in the words of Dina Iordanova "a powerful indictment of past and present-day Croatian nationalism". He settled in Prague and continued to work for Czech Television. More than a decade later, he returned to Zagreb to make his monumental TV series on Josip Broz Tito, Tito – the Last Witnesses of the Testament (2011), co-produced by Croatian Radiotelevision.

Currently, he is working on his film The Children of Kozara (Zlatni Rez 42 (Djeca Kozare)) (in post-production). The story is based on a script which he co-wrote with Arsen Diklić back in the late 1980s, on a young girl which is imprisoned in the Ustaša death camp of Jasenovac along with her two younger brothers, after being captured with her mother in the Kozara Offensive. The story follows her struggle for survival and escape from hell with the support of people who are not ready to allow that perilous, inhuman circumstances make them forget their own humanity. Movie sparked debate on this work. He was targeted in Croatia for mentioning crimes in WW2. Slovenia refused to show his movie.

== Filmography ==
Amateur short films at Kino klub Split

- Sunday (Nedelja; 1961)
- The Boy and the Sea (Dječak i more; 1962)
- City of Split (Splite grade; 1962)
- Ranko the Producer (Proizvođac Ranko; 1962)
- Story (Priča; 1963)
- Diary (Dnevnik; 1964)
- Breath (Dah; 1964)
- Aria (Arija; 1965)
- Night and After Night's Night (Noć i poslije noći, noć; 1965)
- Concerto (Koncert; 1965)
- Rainy (An Innocent Saturday) (Kišno (Nevina subota; 1965)
- Sunny (Sunčano; 1965)
- Mistral (Maestral; 1967)

FAMU student films

- Rondo (1968)
- Lady Cleaner (Gospođa čistačica; 1969)
- The Last Tape (Posljedjna vrpca; 1970)

Professional films

- Long Live the Youth (Diary 2) ([Živjela mladost (Dnevnik 2); 1965)
- Portraits (Passing by) (Portreti (u prolazu); 1966)
- Little Rascal (Mali vagabund; 1966)
- Johnny Dear they Stole Your Gold (Dragi Džoni kradeju ti zlato; 1966)
- Day and Night (Piazza) (Dan i noć (Pjaca); 1966)
- Upper City (Gornji grad; 1966)
- Cavalcade (three films) (Kavalkada (tri filma); 1967)
- Girl X (Djevojka X; 1967)
- People (Passers-by) (Ljudi (u prolazu); 1967)
- Afternoon (Rifle) (Poslije podne (puška); 1967)
- Sunday (Nedjelja; 1969)
- Waltz (My First Dance) (Valcer (moj prvi ples); 1970)
- Ave Maria (My First Bender) (Ave Marija (moje prvo pijanstvo); 1971)
- Antique (Antika; 1971)
- The Seas (Mora; 1972)
- Suburbs of Isis (Predgrađe (Ibisa); 1972)
- Zavnoh (1973)
- Murder on the Night Train (Ubistvo u noćnom vozu; 1973)
- Dalmatian Chronicle (Kronika jednog zločinca; 1973)
- Labour Builds the City (Rad zida grad; 1974)
- Dream (de natura sonoris) (San (de natura sonoris); 1975)
- Passion According to Matthew (Muke po Mati; 1975)
- Zagreb Fair (Zagrebački velesajam; 1976)
- Film on Workers and Guests (Film o radnicima i gostima; 1977)
- Occupation in 26 Pictures (Okupacija u 26 slika; 1978)
- A Free Interpretation (Slobodna interpretacija; 1979)
- Zagreb Lives with Tito (Zagreb živi s Titom; 1980)
- The Fall of Italy (Pad Italije; 1981)
- Homeland (Vladimir Nazor) (Zavičaj (Vladimir Nazor); 1982)
- Angel's Bite (Ujed anđela; 1983)
- Jasenovac: The Cruelest Death Camp of All Times (Krv i pepeo Jasenovca; 1985)
- Evening Bells (Večernja zvona; 1986)
- Mare adriaticum (1986)
- Amorella (1987)
- Aloa (The Whores' Festival) (Haloa (Praznik kurvi); 1988)
- Decline of the Century: The Testament of L.Z. (Zalazak stoljeća: Testament L.Z.; 1993)
- Lacrimosa (The Vengeance is Mine (Má je pomsta (Lacrimosa); 1995)
- Who is M.Š. (Kdo je M.Š.; 2000)
- Terracotta Faces (Lica terakota; 2003)
- The Eyes of Beijing (Oči Pekinga; 2003)
- Celestial City Symphony (Simfonija nebeskog grada; 2003)
- Tito – the Last Witnesses of the Testament: 1. Prologue (Tito – posljednji svjedoci testamenta: 1. Proslov; 2011)
- Tito – the Last Witnesses of the Testament: 2. Underground (Tito – posljednji svjedoci testamenta: 2. Ilegala; 2011)
- Tito – the Last Witnesses of the Testament: 3. Daybreak (Tito – posljednji svjedoci testamenta: 3. Praskozorje; 2011)
- Tito – the Last Witnesses of the Testament: 4. Uprising (Tito – posljednji svjedoci testamenta: 4. Ustanak; 2011)
- Tito – the Last Witnesses of the Testament: 5. Pain and Hope (Tito – posljednji svjedoci testamenta: 5. Patnja i nada; 2011)
- Tito – the Last Witnesses of the Testament: 6. The Fight (Tito – posljednji svjedoci testamenta: 6. Borba; 2011)
- Tito – the Last Witnesses of the Testament: 7. Creation (Tito – posljednji svjedoci testamenta: 7. Stvaranje; 2011)
- Tito – the Last Witnesses of the Testament: 8. Victory and Reprisal (Tito – posljednji svjedoci testamenta: 8. Pobjeda i odmazda; 2011)
- Tito – the Last Witnesses of the Testament: 9. Conquest (Tito – posljednji svjedoci testamenta: 9. Conquest; 2011)
- Tito – the Last Witnesses of the Testament: 10. Blossoming (Tito – posljednji svjedoci testamenta: 10. Procvat; 2011)
- Tito – the Last Witnesses of the Testament: 11. 777 Weeks (Tito – posljednji svjedoci testamenta: 11. 777 sedmica; 2011)
- Tito – the Last Witnesses of the Testament: 12. Discord (Tito – posljednji svjedoci testamenta: 12. Razdor; 2011)
- Tito – the Last Witnesses of the Testament: 13. Death (Tito – posljednji svjedoci testamenta: 13. Smrt; 2011)
- Zeitgeist (Duh vremena; 2018)

In post-production

- Zlatni rez 42 (Djeca Kozare)

Work in Progress

- Posljednja priča stoljeća (Ostrvo Balkan)
- Karuso
- Moć Ljubavi
- Miss Sarajevo
- Sestre
- Bizarno
