= The Fall of Italy =

- Pad Italije
- Directed by: Lordan Zafranović
- Written by: Mirko Kovač; Lordan Zafranović
- Starring: Daniel Olbrychski; Ena Begović; Frano Lasić; Snežana Savić; Antun Nalis; Gorica Popović; Mirjana Karanović; Miodrag Krivokapić; Dragan Maksimović
- Cinematography: Božidar Nikolić
- Edited by: Josip Remenar
- Music by: Alfi Kabiljo
- Production companies: Jadran Film; Centar Film
- Release date: 1981
- Running time: 114 minutes
- Country: Yugoslavia
- Language: Serbo-Croatian

The Fall of Italy (Serbo-Croatian: Pad Italije) is a 1981 Yugoslav war film by Croatian director Lordan Zafranović.

It won the Big Golden Arena for Best Film at the 1981 Pula Film Festival.

== Plot ==
On a Dalmatian island, the partisan commander Davorin (Daniel Olbrychski) liquidates, according to the party's understanding, an immoral friend and comrade Nika (Frano Lasić) and his lover, Krasna (Snežana Savić), an Italian collaborator. Davorin later marries the beautiful Veronika (Ena Begović), the daughter of a rich local. Owing to Davorin's negligence, the Nazis, Ustashe and Chetniks arrive on the island after Italy capitulates.

The fall of Italy causes armies to mobilise, leads to panic, skirmishes, cruelty and incentifies revenge. The island suffers from said panic and destruction. The commander of a partisan unit, a man dedicated to the cause, falls in love with a girl whose father is a landowner and traitor. From that moment on, he finds it harder to choose between love and freedom, and his resolve becomes weaker. His younger brother, who grew up during the revolution, judges his irresponsible behaviour. This story is followed by a mosaic of other characters and their fates.

== Cast ==
- Daniel Olbrychski as Davorin
- Ena Begović as Veronika
- Gorica Popović as Božica
- Mirjana Karanović as Mare
- Dragan Maksimović as Rafo
- Miodrag Krivokapić as Andro
- Dušan Janićijević as Ljubo
- Ljiljana Krstić as Antica
- Bata Živojinović as Grgo Kusturin
- Frano Lasić as Niko
- Snežana Savić as Krasna
- Igor Hajdarhodžić as Lovre
- Mira Župan as Luce
- Tonko Lonza as Fra Blago
- Miroljub Lešo as Vasilij Denisenko, Circassian
- Antun Nalis as priest
- Ranko Gučevac as Chetnik
- Alenka Rančić
- Zaim Muzaferija

== Awards and honours ==
=== Awards ===
- Pula Film Festival, 1981 - Big Golden Arena for Best Film, Golden Arena for Best Director
- Valencia Film Festival, 1982 - Grand Prix (Lordan Zafranović)

=== Nominations ===
- Venice Film Festival, 1981 - Golden Lion (Lordan Zafranović)

== Legacy ==
The Yugoslav Film Archive, in accordance with its authorities based on the Law on Cultural Heritage, declared one hundred Serbian feature films (1911–1999) as cultural heritage of great importance on December 28, 2016. The Fall of Italy is also on that list.
