= A Man Who Liked Funerals =

A Man Who Liked Funerals (Čovjek koji je volio sprovode) is a 1989 Croatian film directed by Zoran Tadić, starring Ivica Vidović and Gordana Gadžić.
