= Mirko Kovač (writer) =

Yugoslav writer

- Born: 26 December 1938; Petrovići near Nikšić, Kingdom of Yugoslavia
- Died: 19 August 2013 (aged 74); Rovinj, Croatia
- Occupations: Novelist, short story writer, essayist, screenwriter, political activist
- Writing career
- Genre: Postmodernism
- Notable awards: NIN award (1978), Herder Prize (1995), Vilenica International Literary Prize (2003)

Mirko Kovač (26 December 1938 – 19 August 2013) was a Montenegrin writer of novels, short stories, essays, film scripts, TV and radio plays. Among his best known works are the novella Životopis Malvine Trifković, the novels Vrata od utrobe, Grad u zrcalu, the short story collection Ruže za Nives Koen, the book of essays Europska trulež and the scripts for some of the most successful films of Yugoslav cinema like Handcuffs, Playing Soldiers and Occupation in 26 Pictures among others. He was one quarter of the infamous Belgrade quartet, the other three being Danilo Kiš, Borislav Pekić and Filip David.

== Biography ==
Kovač was born to a Croat father and a Serb mother in the village of Petrovići in Banjani region near Nikšić, Montenegro. He went to elementary school in Trebinje but after leaving his family at the age of 16 he went to Vojvodina where he finished high school in Novi Sad. During that time he discovered the works of poet Tin Ujević and became interested in literature. He went on to study the works of other notable Croatian authors like Ranko Marinković, Vladan Desnica, Antun Branko Šimić and Vjekoslav Kaleb. After finishing school he published his first essay called Tri pesnika (Three Poets) about the works of Tin Ujević, Branko Miljković and Oskar Davičo. His first book Gubilište was published in 1962 and caused a big bang on the Yugoslav literature scene. The communist authorities declared the book inappropriate because of its dark portrayal of life and started a campaign against Kovač which resulted in a year-long polemic. Many authors including Predrag Matvejević and Danilo Kiš wrote in Kovač's defence.

He received the Serbian NIN Prize in 1978 and the Andrić Prize in 1979, Swedish PEN Tucholsky Award (1993), German Herder Prize (1995), Montenegrin Njegoš Award (2009) and 13th July award (2004), Slovenian Vilenica Award (2003), Croatian Vladimir Nazor Award (2008), etc. He lived in Belgrade, but moved to Rovinj, Croatia, his wife's hometown, after Slobodan Milošević came to power.

An annual award in his name is given to authors from the Balkans in four categories.

== Bibliography ==
- Gubilište (1962), novel
- Moja sestra Elida (1965), novel
- Malvina (1970), novella
- Rane Luke Meštrevića (1971), short story collection
- Ruganje sa dušom (1976), novel
- Vrata od utrobe (1978), novel (NIN award)
- Uvod u drugi život (1983), novel
- Evropska trulež (1986), essays
- Nebeski zaručnici (1987), short story collection
- Okupacija u 26 slika i drugi scenariji (1990), film scripts
- Evropska trulež i drugi eseji (1994), essays
- Bodež u srcu (1995), publicist texts
- Kristalne rešetke (1995), novel
- Na odru (1996), short stories
- Rastresen život (1996), novel fragments
- Cvjetanje mase (1997), publicist texts
- Knjiga pisama 1992-1995 (1998), correspondence with Filip David
- Isus na koži (2003), plays
- Grad u zrcalu (2007), novel
- Pisanje ili nostalgija (2008), essays
- Ruže za Nives Koen (2009), short story collection
- Vrijeme koje se udaljava (2013), memoir

Screenplays:

- Playing Soldiers
- Lisice
- Passion According to Matthew
- Occupation in 26 Pictures
- The Fall of Italy
- Evening Bells
- Tetoviranje
- Libertas

== Sources ==
- Nina Ožegović (12 August 2008). "Mirko Kovač - istarsko utočište majstora kazališne provokacije" [Mirko Kovač - Istrian refuge of the master of theatrical provocation]. Nacional (in Croatian). Archived from the original on 24 March 2012.
