= Nenad Polimac =

Croatian film critic

Nenad Polimac (born 1949) is a Croatian film critic.

Polimac was born in Zagreb. His earliest published writings on film date from 1972. He was a co-founder of the Zagreb-based Film magazine where he served as an editor from 1975 to 1979. From 1978 to 1984 Polimac was a member of the film editorial board of Radiotelevision Zagreb. Since 1990, Polimac worked as an editor and film critic in Globus and Nacional weeklies. For a period of 11 months, between 2008 and 2009, he served as an editor-in-chief of Globus. As of 2010, Polimac wrote for Europapress Holding publications and worked as an editor and essay writer in Gordogan, a cultural magazine.

Polimac was, with Jurica Pavičić, one of two Croatian film critics who participated in the British Film Institute's Sight & Sound Greatest Films of All Time poll in 2012.
