= Evening Bells (film) =

- Directed by: Lordan Zafranović
- Written by: Mirko Kovač
- Based on: Vrata od utrobe by Mirko Kovač
- Produced by: Sulejman Kapić
- Starring: Rade Šerbedžija; Petar Božović; Miodrag Krivokapić; Neda Arnerić; Ljiljana Blagojević; Mustafa Nadarević; Irfan Mensur; Ivo Gregurević
- Cinematography: Andrija Pivčević
- Edited by: Andrija Zafranović
- Production company: Jadran Film
- Release date: 27 March 1986
- Running time: 120 minutes
- Country: Yugoslavia
- Language: Serbo-Croatian

Evening Bells (Croatian: Večernja zvona) is a 1986 Yugoslav film directed by Lordan Zafranović, starring Rade Šerbedžija and Neda Arnerić. It is based on Vrata od utrobe, a 1978 novel by Mirko Kovač.
