= The Ambassador (1984 Croatian film) =

The Ambassador (Ambasador) is a 1984 Croatian film directed by Fadil Hadžić, starring Miodrag Radovanović and Fabijan Šovagović.

== Sources ==
- "Ambasador" (in Croatian).
