= A Mess in the House =

- Directed by: Ljubiša Ristić
- Written by: Nermina Ferizbegovic; Ljubisa Ristic; Nada Kokotovic; Lazar Stojanovic
- Produced by: Sulejman Kapic
- Starring: Zvonimir Zoricic; Miodrag Krivokapic; Zdenka Hersak
- Cinematography: Enes Midzic
- Edited by: Ingeborg Fülepp
- Production company: Jadran Film
- Release date: 9 July 1980
- Running time: 1h 39m
- Country: Yugoslavia
- Language: Serbo-Croatian

A Mess in the House (Serbian: Luda kuća) is a 1980 Serbian

film directed by Ljubiša Ristić.

== Sources ==
- "Luda kuća". Baza HR kinematografije (in Croatian). Croatian Film Association.
