= Angel's Bite =

Angel's Bite (Ujed anđela) is a 1984 Yugoslav film directed by Lordan Zafranović.

== Cast ==
- Katalin Ladik as Zena
- Boris Blazekovic as Neznanac
- Boris Kralj as Muz
- Marina Nemet as Djevojka
- Charles Millot as Starac

== Sources ==
- "Ujed anđela". Baza HR kinematografije (in Croatian).
