= Zdenko Jelčić =

Croatian actor

- Born: 8 August 1946 (age 79); Čapljina, PR Bosnia and Herzegovina, FPR Yugoslavia
- Occupation: Actor
- Years active: 1972–present

Zdenko Jelčić (born 8 August 1946) is a Croatian actor. He has appeared in more than fifty films since 1972.

== Selected filmography ==
| Year | Title | Role | Notes |
|---|---|---|---|
| 2012 | Vegetarian Cannibal | | |
| 2008 | No One's Son | | |
| 2006 | Das Fräulein | | |
| 1990 | Eagle | | |
| 1988 | War and Remembrance | SS Sergeant (Ukraine) | Uncredited |
| 1987 | Kraljeva završnica | | |
| 1986 | Un Ponte per l' Inferno | Milan Ković | |
| 1977 | Don't Lean Out the Window | | |
