= Zoran Tadić =

Croatian film director

- Born: 2 September 1941; Livno, Yugoslavia
- Died: 9 September 2007 (aged 66); Zagreb, Croatia
- Occupation: Film director
- Years active: 1969–1997

Zoran Tadić (2 September 1941 – 9 September 2007) was a Croatian film director, critic, and pedagogue.

Zoran Tadić is considered as one of the most important Croatian film directors, having directed more than twenty films from 1969 to 1997. He studied comparative literature and philosophy in Zagreb. He began his career as a critic and publicist in 1961, and then as an assistant, assistant director and co-writer.

Tadić is best known for Rhythm of a Crime (1981), a science-fiction thriller based on a short story by Pavao Pavličić.

== Selected filmography ==
- Rhythm of a Crime (1981)
- The Third Key (1983)
- Dreaming the Rose (1986)
- Eagle (1990)
