= Pavao Pavličić =

Croatian writer

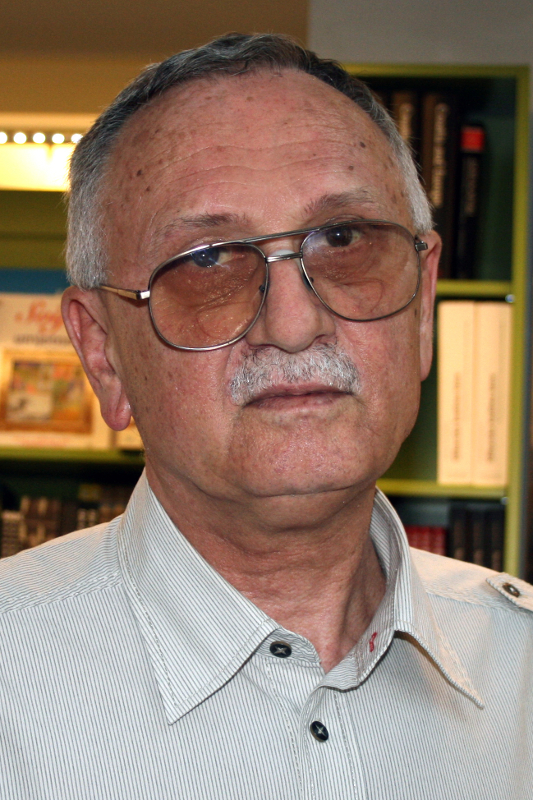
- Born: 16 August 1946 (age 80); Vukovar, PR Croatia, FPR Yugoslavia
- Education: B.A. in Comparative Literature and Italian language (1969); Ph.D. in Literature (1974)
- Alma mater: University of Zagreb
- Occupation: University professor
- Writing career
- Language: Croatian
- Period: 1972–present

Pavao Pavličić (born 16 August 1946, in Vukovar) is a Croatian writer, literary historian and translator whose main focus are crime novels. He writes for both adults and children.

Pavao Pavličić was born on August 16, 1946, in Vukovar, where he completed elementary school and high school. In 1969, he graduated from the Faculty of Philosophy of Zagreb University with a degree in comparative literature and the Italian language, and in 1974 he received his doctorate with a thesis in the field of metrics (Rhyme sisters in Croatian literature: literary-theoretical and literary-historical aspects).

Since 1997, Pavličić is a full member of the Croatian Academy of Sciences and Arts.

In 2014 he won the Zvane Črnja Award for his Narodno veselje.
