= Golden Arena for Best Film Music =

- Country: Yugoslavia (1955–1990); Croatia (1992–present)
- Presented by: Pula Film Festival Jury
- First award: 1955
- Currently held by: Igor Paro (2020)
- Website: Official Website

== List of winners ==
The following is a list of winners of the Golden Arena for Best Film Music at the Pula Film Festival.

=== Yugoslav competition (1955–1990) ===
Year	Winner	English title(s)	Original title(s)
1955	Bojan Adamič		Njih dvojica
1956	Marjan Kozina		Dolina miru
1957	Borivoje Simić (shared)	Priests Ćira and Spira	Pop Ćira i pop Spira
1957	Bojan Adamič (2) (shared)		Tuđa zemlja
1958	Bojan Adamič (3)	The Sky Through the Trees	Kroz granje nebo
1959	Marijan Lipovšek		Dobri stari pianino
1960	Branimir Sakač	The Ninth Circle	Deveti krug
1961			
1962	Marjan Vodopivec		Družinski dnevnik
1963	Dušan Radić		Mačak pod šljemom Čovek i zver
1964	Alojz Srebotnjak		Ne joči, Peter
1965	Tomica Simović		Doći i ostati
1966			
1967	Zoran Hristić		Hasanaginica
1968	Miljenko Prohaska		Gravitacija ili fantastična mladost činovnika Borisa Horvata
1969	Zoran Hristić (2)		Vrane; Horoskop
1970	Vojislav Kostić		Biciklisti; Krvava bajka
1971	Jože Privšek		Na klancu
1972	Kornelije Kovač		Bez
1973	Tomislav Zografski		Ukleti smo, Irina
1974	Alojz Srebotnjak (2)		Pastirica
1975	Uroš Krek		Povest o dobrih ljudeh
1976	Alfi Kabiljo	Anno Domini 1573	Seljačka buna 1573
1977	Borislav Tamindžić		Beštije
1978	Zoran Simjanović		Miris poljskog cveća
1979	Buldožer		Živi bili pa vidjeli
1980	Kornelije Kovač (2)		Snovi, život, smrt Filipa Filipovića
1981	Alfi Kabiljo (2)	The Falcon	Banović Strahinja
1982	Bashkim Shehu		
1983	Zoran Simjanović (2)	Balkan Express	Balkan ekspres
1984	Brane Živković	In the Jaws of Life	U raljama života
1985	Živan Cvitković		Horvatov izbor
1986	Ljupčo Konstantinov	Happy New Year '49	Srećna nova '49
1987	Janez Gregorc		Ljubezni Blanke Kolak
1988	Gjon Gjevlekaj		
1989	Arsen Dedić		Donator
1990	Goran Bregović	Silent Gunpowder	Gluvi barut

=== Croatian competition (1992–present) ===
Year	Winner	English title	Original title
1991	Festival was not held.		
1992	Davor Rocco	The Time of Warriors	Vrijeme ratnika
1993	Igor Kuljerić	Countess Dora	Kontesa Dora
1994	Award ceremony cancelled.		
1995	Zrinko Tutić	A Journey Through the Dark Side	Putovanje tamnom polutkom
1996	Davor Rocco (2)		Prepoznavanje
1997	Arsen Dedić (2)	Pont Neuf	Pont Neuf
1998	Zrinko Tutić (2)	When the Dead Start Singing	Kad mrtvi zapjevaju
1999	Đelo Jusić	Dubrovnik Twilight	Dubrovački suton
2000	Mate Matišić	Marshal Tito's Spirit	Maršal
2001	Davor Rocco (3)	Slow Surrender	Polagana predaja
2002	Dalibor Pavičić	Winter in Rio	Prezimiti u Riu
2003	Mate Matišić (2)	Witnesses	Svjedoci
2004	Igor Kuljerić (2)	Long Dark Night	Duga mračna noć
2005	Darko Hajsek	Sleep Sweet, My Darling	Snivaj, zlato moje
2006	Tamara Obrovac	What Is a Man Without a Moustache?	Što je muškarac bez brkova
2007	Andrija Milić	The Living and the Dead	Živi i mrtvi
2008	Mate Matišić (3)	No One's Son	Ničiji sin
2009	Srđan Gulić	Donkey	Kenjac
2010	Alfi Kabiljo (3) (co-winner)	Just Between Us	Neka ostane među nama
2010	Alan Bjelinski (co-winner)	Just Between Us	Neka ostane među nama
2011	Dinko Appelt	Koko and the Ghosts	Koko i duhovi
2012	Stanko Kovačić (co-winner)	Sonja and the Bull	Sonja i bik
2012	Damir Martinović (co-winner)	Sonja and the Bull	Sonja i bik
2012	Ivanka Mazurkijević (co-winner)	Sonja and the Bull	Sonja i bik
2013	Jura Ferina (co-winner)	Hush	Šuti
2013	Pavle Miholjević (co-winner)	Hush	Šuti
2014	Luka Zima	Zagreb Cappucino	Zagreb kapućino
2015	Teho Teardo	You Carry Me	Ti mene nosiš
2016	Rundek Cargo Trio	Generation '68	Generacija '68
2017	Alen Sinkauz (co-winner)	Goran	Goran
2017	Nenad Sinkauz (co-winner)	Goran	Goran
2018	Alen Sinkauz (2) (co-winner)	The Eighth Commissioner	Osmi povjerenik
2018	Nenad Sinkauz (2) (co-winner)	The Eighth Commissioner	Osmi povjerenik
2019	Alen Sinkauz (3) (co-winner)	The Diary of Diana B	Dnevnik Diane Budisavljević
2019	Nenad Sinkauz (3) (co-winner)	The Diary of Diana B	Dnevnik Diane Budisavljević
2020	Igor Paro	Fishing and Fishermen's Conversations	Ribanje i ribarsko prigovaranje
