= Šovagović =

Šovagović is a surname. Notable people with the surname include:

- Anja Šovagović-Despot (born 1963), Croatian actress
- Fabijan Šovagović, Croatian actor, father of Anja and Filip
- Filip Šovagović (born 1966), Croatian actor
