= Mladen Juran =

- Born: 8 May 1942 (age 83); Zagreb, Cr Awardoatia

Mladen Juran (born 8 May 1942) is a Croatian film director, screenwriter and actor - the author with the nominations for the Main Film Prize in Latin America and the Best European Fantastic Film, Oscar Academy Awards Candidate - films thematic related to roots and emigration, rebellion - an individual in the whirlpool of unfavorable and surreal social events, organized crime, love, loneliness, fate, the existential measure of everyone’s life, whether that life in monumental, ordinary, null or simply human - with debuting in French cinema, recorded in "Histoire du cinéma français 1966-1970", on the occasion of the 100th anniversary of French cinema.

== Early life ==
Juran was born in Zagreb. He graduated from high school in Split in 1960. After obtaining a diploma from the Faculty of Economics at the University of Zagreb in 1964, he went to Paris, where he graduated in 1968 from the Dramatic Arts College Charles Dullin at Jean Vilar's Théâtre National Populaire - "l'Ecole Supérieure d'Art Dramatique Charles Dullin au Théâtre National Populaire" at the Palais de Chaillot. During his study, he performed as an actor and worked with the theater, television and film, assisting directors Michael Cacoyannis, Abel Gance and Med Hondo. In 1967 he worked in Paris as an intern for Lee Strasberg, director of the Actors Studio.

== Work ==
After his return to Croatia, Juran started a career at the national television. Since 1973, he created more than 200 films and television series - Last Post Zagreb (Original Music Score by Croatian vibraphonist Boško Petrović), Zagreb's Greetings, Zagreb's Panopticum, Scenes of the Last Century - of various genres including - the full-length features Thirty Horses (1987), a comedy about the consequences of the totalitarian system which he directed from a screenplay by Ivo Brešan and with a number of renowned actors, including: Boris Dvornik, Milena Dravić, Milan Štrljić, Josip Genda, Sven Lasta...), And while the heart is going to be Croatia - AG Matoš (1993, a retrospective of exciting life adventures, morals, politics, culture, love and thoughts are glamorous, intriguing and demanding about us today more than ever), The Tin Heart (1994),(Original Music Score Arsen Dedić ) - a successful "rock generation - defender Slavko Juraga and businessman Filip Šovagović in the fullness of the iconography of Croatian War of Independence Profiters.

Juran's 18-minute short film Transatlantic (1982) - described as a "surrealist depiction of tragic fate of the Croatian emigrant" - received high acclaim, and has been listed among the best Croatian short films ever. Both before and after making the short film, Juran was trying to make a full-length feature film with the same subject, but hints to political emigration were not seen as welcome, and Juran's idea was realized only after the fall of communism.

Transatlantic - a feature film of the same name - A movie epic about emigration, roots, America, Croatia, organized crime, love, loneliness, fate, the existential measure of everyone's life, whether that life in monumental, ordinary, null or simply human, with famous actor names such as - the Australian dive of Croatian origin Melita Jurišić (co-stars of the Best World Film in 2015 by Fripesci Critics - Mad Max: Fury Road), Filip Šovagović, Boris Dvornik, Alen Liverić, Relje Bašić, Ivo Gregurević, Matije Prskalo - to the special guest star in the Prologue of Martin Sheen - with the lyrical music of the song and the theme of Nenad Bach (Can We Go Higher - with Vince Welnick from The Greateful Dead), also with Original Music Score of Alan Bjelinski and Bruno Bjelinski - was world-wide accepted who won the 4 Golden Arenas at the Pula Film Festival in 1998 and the Kodak Award, is a record for the Croatian television (by 2016, over Five and a Half million viewers!), selected as the first film of independent Croatia in the official competition of one of Few Recognized World Class A Festivals - nomination for the Golden Ombu, Mar del Plata International Film Festival 1999, the only Category A Festival in Latin America, where it was at the opening of the festival and in the festival distribution in Argentina, over 30,000 spectators - selected for the official program of another A category - Moscow International Film Festival 1999 - was also Croatia's submission for the Academy Award for Best Foreign Language Film that year.

"A movie epic about emigration, roots, America, Croatia, organized crime, love, loneliness, fate, the existential measure of everyone’s life, whether that life in monumental, ordinary, null or simply human. This taboo-theme in Croatian culture is brilliantly realized in the genre of a social psychological drama with melodramatic, criminal and adventure elements. This MichaelCiminoesque film was successfully presented in Los Angeles cinemas as the Croatian Oscar nomination - for best foreign film in 1998." - R. G. Tilly, 2003.

The Sunken Cemetery (2002) - According to Goran Tribuson's novel - surrealistic depiction of this time of war disaster in Croatia in the nineties - a terrible atmosphere, in the milestone of returnees' emigrants (Barbara Nola and Sven Medvešek) in the catastrophic homeland, with the music of Igor Kuljerić and with the screenplay and acting collaboration of Oscar-winner Jiri Menzel, upgraded to thriller elements and occasional comedy or grotesque situations - was nominated for the Melies d'Or Award - the Best European Fantastic Film - Brussels International Fantastic Film Festival 2003.

"The Horror of Mladen Juran The sunken cemetery that won the Sci-Fi festival in Brussels portrays a middle-aged man who returns to (...) ... the development of the drama, upgraded to thriller elements and occasional comedy or grotesque situations. The director takes the film with an extraordinary sense of rhythm, refined eye for detail, creating true characters. Despite the provocative theme, this is about unsurpassed quality. "- Andre Deutsch, Variety, 2004.

Syndrome Halla, The Inception of Croatian Professional Film – Born to Die (2017), with Relja Bašić the Faustian idea of restoring the lost films in the tradition of the first Croatian feature films, missing and forgotten of the horror of forgetfulness, shot by the first Croatian professional cinematographer Josip Halla, whose name also disappeared in the indoctrined silence of the twentieth century) - the short feature film The attack on the National Bank in Rijeka, 1909 (2009, the remake of the first feature film shot in Croatia) - the documentary films Take off (1976), Fear in the Bliznec Creek Valley (1978), Do not look up (1979), The Trilogy of The Living Photographs 1,2,3 (1982, 2006 and 2008), School of Public Health Andrija Štampar - Our Unknown Film Industry (1984), Between Life and Death (1989), The first went to documentaries (1990), A Tribute to America (2007), Dr. Andrija Štampar, Visionary (2012).

Juran's 1982 documentary about the early history of Croatian cinematography, The Living Photographs (Živuće fotografije) has been credited with establishing a new perspective on the history of film in Croatia and influencing the education of future Croatian filmmakers and film scholars.

Juran returns to the theater which he directed for the Croatian National Theatre, Rijeka in 1995- Poet's Fate, a drama of identity, the poet Petar Preradović, an Austrian officer who had forgotten Mother tongue and dealt with spiritualism (with Slavko Juraga, Olivera Baljak, Alen Liverić).

Mladen Juran, together with his son, multimedia artist Igor Juran, is the founder of the artistic art organization Adriatic Art Media Film (2011) (Dr Andrija Štampar - Visionary, Syndrome Halla, Morning Program and Quest to North).

== Selected filmography ==
=== Feature films ===
- Thirty Horses (Trideset konja (1987)
- And while the heart is going to be Croatia - AG Matoš (I dok je srca bit će i Kroacije - AG Matoš, 1993)
- The Tin Heart (Kositreno srce, 1994)
- Transatlantic (1998)
- The Sunken Cemetery (Potonulo groblje, 2002)
- Syndrome Halla, The Inception of Croatian Professional Film – Born to Die ( Sindrom Halla, začetak hrvatskog profesionalnog filma - rođenog da umre, 2017)

=== Documentaries ===
- The Living Photographs, 1,2,3 (The Trilogy 1982, 2006 and 2008) (Živuće fotografije, 1,2,3 (Trilogija 1982, 2006, 2008)
- School of Public Health Andrija Štampar - Our Unknown Film Industry (1984) (Škola narodnog zdravlja Andrija Štampar - naša nepoznata filmska industrija, 1984.)
- Between Life and Death (1989) (Između života i smrti, 1989.)
- Tribute to America (2007)
- Dr Andrija Štampar, Visionary (2012) (Dr Andrija Štampar, vizionar, 2012.)
- television series documentary-fiction Last Post Zagreb, Zagreb's Greetings, Zagreb's Panopticum, Scenes of the Last Century (1975 - 1988) (televizijski dokumentarno-igrani serijali Zadnja pošta Zagreb, Zagrebački panopticum, Prizori iz prošlog stoljeća (1975. - 1988.)

=== Short films ===
- Transatlantic (1982)
- The attack on the National Bank in Rijeka, 1909 (2009) (Napad na Narodnu banku u Rijeci, 1909, 2009.)
