= Dragan Despot =

Croatian actor

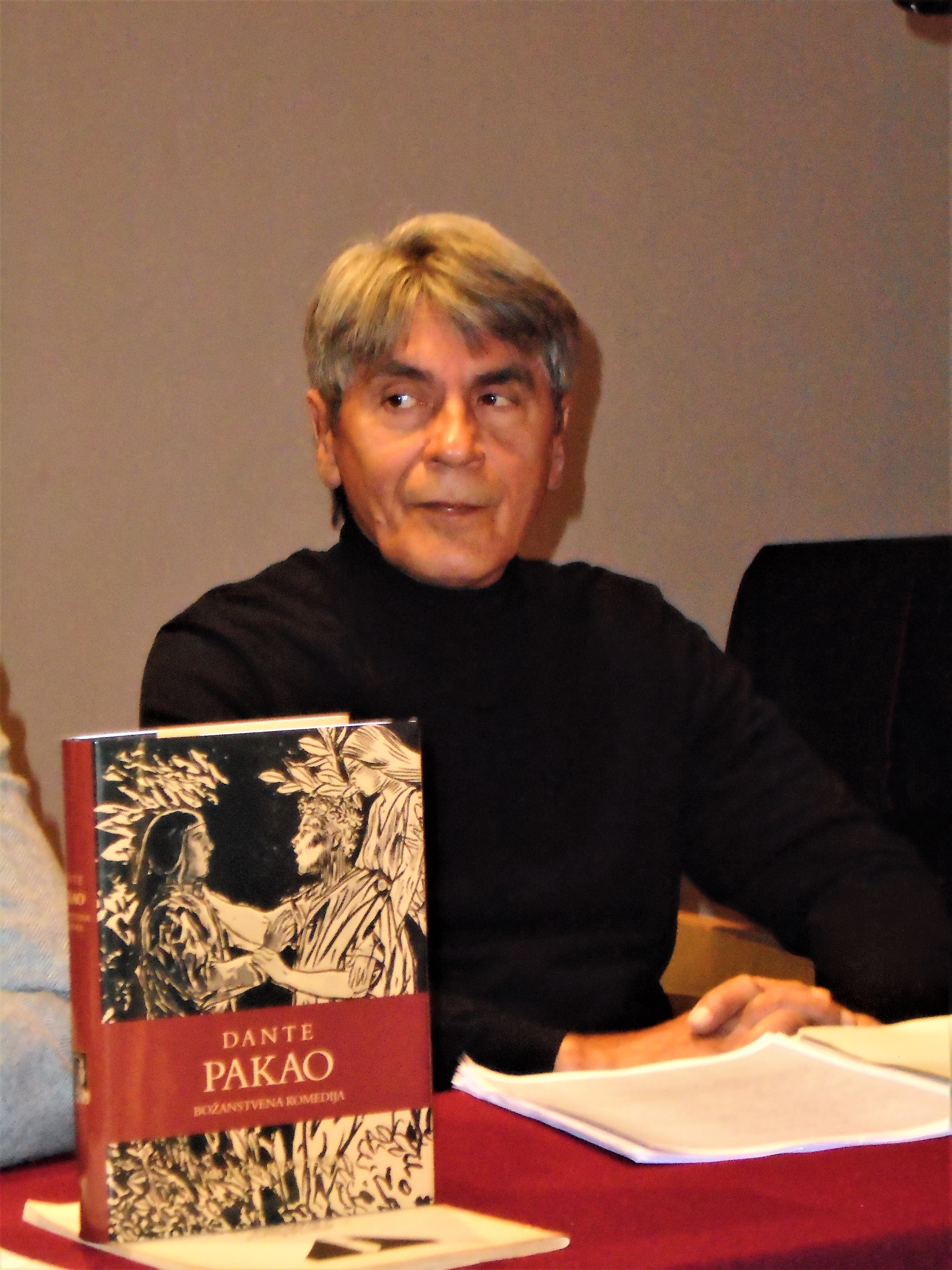
- Born: 14 July 1956 (age 70); Mostar, PR Bosnia and Herzegovina, FPR Yugoslavia
- Education: Academy of Dramatic Art, University of Zagreb
- Occupation: Actor
- Years active: 1979–present
- Spouse: Anja Šovagović (m. 1986)
- Children: 2

Dragan Despot (born 14 July 1956) is a Croatian actor. He has appeared in more than twenty films since 1979.

Despot graduated from the Academy of Dramatic Art at the University of Zagreb, where his teacher was Tonko Lonza in 1981. In 1983 he joined Croatian National Theatre in Mostar and the same year performed at the Dubrovnik Summer Festival. Prior to acting, Despot was a fan of football and loved watching players such as Dušan Bajević, Enver Marić, Franjo Vladić and especially Slaven Zambata. Despite his love for football, he pursued career in acting instead and joined such people as Ivica Vidović, Rade Šerbedžija, Jakov Sedlar, Pero Kvrgić, Mladen Budišćak, Žarko Potočnjak, Duško Valentić, Matko Elezović, Zijad Grčić, Zlatko Vitez and Matko Raguž. Despot is married to Anja Šovagović-Despot, an actress, and together they have a son Josip and daughter Ana.

He voiced Rico in the Croatian dub of Home on the Range (2004).

== Selected filmography ==
Film
Year	Title	Role	Notes
1979	The Return		
1991	Story from Croatia		
2003	Horseman		
2005	Pušća Bistra		
2007	Kradljivac Uspomena		
2012	Cvjetni Trg		
2017	Mrtve Ribe		
2018	Za ona stara dobra vremena		
2026	The Last Roman God		

TV
Year	Title	Role	Notes
1992	Dok nitko ne gleda		
2013	Zora dubrovačka		
2013	Počivali u miru		
2016–2020	Novine	Ludvig Tomašević	
