= Fabijan Šovagović =

Croatian theater and film actor (1932-2001)

- Born: 4 January 1932; Ladimirevci, Kingdom of Yugoslavia
- Died: 1 January 2001 (aged 68); Zagreb, Croatia
- Education: Academy of Dramatic Art
- Alma mater: University of Zagreb
- Occupations: Actor; writer
- Years active: 1957–2001
- Spouse: Maja Blaškov
- Children: Anja; Filip

Fabijan Šovagović (4 January 1932 – 1 January 2001) was a Croatian film, television and theatre actor, and writer.

== Biography ==
Šovagović was born in the village of Ladimirevci, in the Slavonia region of Croatia, then Kingdom of Yugoslavia. He began acting in his youth and from the late 1950s he appeared in many films, becoming one of the most recognisable faces of Croatian and former Yugoslav cinema. He never became a star, but he built a reputation as one of the greatest character actors with memorable roles in many classic films and popular television series. Matija Gubec, whom he played in 1975 film Seljačka buna, is one of his rare starring roles.

In 1979 he played the role of a Dervish in Meetings with Remarkable Men, directed by Peter Brook.

Šovagović was also active in theatre and those experiences led him to begin writing plays of his own. The best known of them all is Sokol ga nije volio ("Sokol Did Not Love Him"), later adapted in 1988 film. It was his movie about his birthplace, Ladimirevci.

His most unforgettable last role was of a Slavonian refugee man in the 1994 movie Vukovar se vraća kući ("Vukovar: The Way Home"). A man lost everything in war except his loving companion dog, and shares destiny of many of his fellow citizens who are exiled from the Slavonian town of Vukovar.

Many believe his brilliant reflection of this tragic Slavonian character was due to a fact that Šovagović being a native Slavonian Croat, have known this feeling firsthand himself. Šovagović played brilliant role of policeman (Žandar) in television series "Kuda idu divlje svinje?" (Where Do Wild Boars Go?).

Through the last years of his life, Šovagović struggled with the consequences of heart strokes. He died in Zagreb, on 1 January 2001, aged 68.

== Personal life ==
Šovagović married Maja Blaškov, with whom he had two children; a daughter, Anja, and a son, Filip, both actors.

His son, Filip, was a leading character in No Man's Land, a 2001 Oscar-winning Bosnian movie. They are both followed his footsteps and became well accredited movie and theatre actors.

== Selected filmography ==
- Svoga tela gospodar (1957)
- H-8... (1958) – Franjo Rošić
- Dvostruki obruč (1963)
- Službeni položaj (1964) – Radnik u pogonu
- Prometej s otoka Viševice (1964) – Vinko
- The Key (1965) - Marko (segment "Čekati")
- Druga strana medalje (1965) – Ustaški policajac
- Monday or Tuesday (1966) – Golubar Boltek
- Breza (1967) – Joza Sveti
- Illusion (1967) – Kolega s faksa
- Crne ptice (1967)
- Gravitacija ili fantastična mladost činovnika Borisa Horvata (1968) – Pijanac
- I Have Two Mothers and Two Fathers (1968) – Drugi tata
- When You Hear the Bells (1969) - Mican
- Događaj (1969) – Matijević
- Slučajni zivot (1969) – TV novinar
- Battle of Neretva (1969) – Boško
- The Fed One (1970) – Apostol
- Lisice (1970) – Ante
- U gori raste zelen bor (1971) - Lazo
- Ovcar (1971) – Perica
- Makedonski del od pekolot (1971) – Bugarski polkovnik
- Short Night of Glass Dolls (1971) – Professor Karting
- Lov na jelene (1972) – Zdravko
- Prvi splitski odred (1972) – Sudac
- Majstor i Margarita (1972) – Berlioz
- Deveto čudo na istoku (1972)
- To Live on Love (1973) – Direktor škole
- Scalawag (1973) – Blackfoot
- Deps (1974) – Dežurni sudija
- A Performance of Hamlet in the Village of Mrdusa Donja (1974) – Učitelj Andro
- Pokoj, rci, jad (1975)
- The House (1975) – Branko
- Anno Domini 1573 (1975) – Matija Gubec
- Četiri dana do smrti (1976) – Dr. Bedeković
- The Rat Savior (1976) – Professor Martin Bošković
- A Shot (1977) – Pajo Bradić
- Ne naginji se van (1977) – Mate
- Snowstorm (1977) – Žandar
- Meetings with Remarkable Men (1979) – Dervish
- Novinar (1979) – Stanko Kos
- Povratak (1979) – Barba Pave
- Usijanje (1979) – Ante
- Daj sto das (1979)
- Olovna brigada (1980)
- Rhythm of a Crime (1981) – Fabijan
- Dvije polovine srca (1982) – Sudija
- Hoću živjeti (1982) – Marko Mlinarić
- Zločin u školi (1982) – Direktor
- Servantes iz Malog Mista (1982) – Tajnik MZ
- Medeni mjesec (1983) – Čika Sima
- The Ambassador (1984) – Majstor centralnog grijanja
- Mala pljačka vlaka (1984) – Grof Andrej Tihonov
- Horvat's Choice (1985) – Lazar Margitić 'Lazo'
- I to će proći (1985) – Isidor Katanić 'Zeko'
- Un foro nel parabrezza (1985) – Marito di Daniza
- Crveni i crni (1985) – Petar Perbako
- San o ruži (1986) – Laci
- Na putu za Katangu (1987) – Upravnik Janković
- Osuđeni (1987) – Pero
- Hi-Fi (1987) – Boris Bojanovski
- My Uncle's Legacy (1988) – Martinov djed
- Sokol Did Not Love Him (1988) – Sima
- Čovjek koji je volio sprovode (1989) – Gabrek
- Diploma za smrt (1989) – Pavel
- Povratak Katarine Kožul (1989)
- Hamburg Altona (1989)
- Silent Gunpowder (1990) – Pop Novak
- Ljeto za sjećanje (1990) – Ujak
- Orao (1990) – Kristofic
- Čaruga (1991) – Brico
- Đuka Begović (1991) – Sima
- Vukovar: The Way Home (1994) – Baja
- The Third Woman (1997) – Funtak

== Bibliography ==
- Glumčevi zapisi (1977, 1979)
- Sokol ga nije volio (1981, 1986, 2003)
- Divani Fabe Šovagova (1996)

== Discography ==
- Pokraj Karašice selo malo (1985)
