= Naši i vaši =

- Created by: Mario Raguž; Vanča Kljaković
- Starring: Dijana Bolanča; Hrvoje Klobučar; Slavko Brankov; Filip Radoš
- Country of origin: Croatia
- Original language: Croatian
- No. of seasons: 2
- No. of episodes: 23

Production
- Running time: cca 35 minutes

Original release
- Network: HRT
- Release: April 14, 2000 – July 6, 2002

Naši i Vaši (English: Ours and Yours) is a Croatian comedy TV series whose pilot episode aired in 2000 on HRT. The first season of the series had seven episodes, and the second and last season's 15 episodes counters.

== Synopsis ==
Student of sociology Iva, with Herzegovinian Croat origin, and her colleague from faculty Neno, from Zagreb, announced to parents to marry because they are expecting a child. Both parents was opposed to the wedding, but when he finally gets to the marriage proposal, things go develop the unexpected.

The series "Naši i Vaši" is amusing but at the same time warm-hearted teasing mentality difference between citizens of Zagreb (Prigorians) and Herzegovinians. In the manner of quality folk humor follow link two young people who love and connect what is seemingly unrelated - his own family. We'll follow that love flirt of Franjo and Stana, Jure to sit the exams in Štef's school and later there fighting for business space, Milka that from Biba seeking fashion advice, and Iva and Neno who choose to be tenants. Eventually, the two will reunite families.

== Episodes ==
=== Season 1 (2000/2001) ===
- S1E1 - Pilot (2000)
- S1E2 - Deda i baba (2001)
- S1E3 - Školovanje (2001)
- S1E4 - Moda (2001)
- S1E5 - Podstanari (2001)
- S1E6 - Zdravljak (2001)
- S1E7 - Promocija (2001)

=== Season 2 (2001/2002) ===
- S2E1 - Doček (31 December 2001)
- S2E2 - Adaptacija (30 March 2002)
- S2E3 - Bez imena (6 April 2002)
- S2E4 - Ročnik (13 April 2002)
- S2E5 - Neki to vole vruće (20 April 2002)
- S2E6 - Uskrs (27 April 2002)
- S2E7 - Mirovina (4 May 2002)
- S2E8 - Poduzeće (11 May 2002)
- S2E9 - Komadić sreće (25 May 2002)
- S2E10 - Virtuoz (1 June 2002)
- S2E11 - Srebrni pir (8 June 2002)
- S2E12 - Prošnja (15 June 2002)
- S2E13 - Svadba (22 June 2002)
- S2E14 - Zajednički život (29 June 2002)
- S2E15 - Garsonijera (6 July 2002)

== Cast ==
=== Main cast ===
| Actor/actress | Character | Season in series |
|---|---|---|
| Hrvoje Klobučar | Nenad "Neno" Smolek | 1-2 |
| Dijana Bolanča | Iva Rašelić | 1-2 |
| Slavko Brankov | Stjepan "Štef" Smolek | 1-2 |
| Mirjana Majurec | Biserka "Biba" Smolek | 1-2 |
| Emil Glad | Franjo "Franc" Smolek | 1-2 |
| Filip Radoš | Antun "Antiša" Rašelić | 1-2 |
| Mirela Brekalo | Milka Rašelić | 1-2 |
| Semka Sokolović-Bertok | Stana Rašelić | 1-2 |
| Vedran Mlikota | Jure Rašelić | 1-2 |
| Ljubomir Kerekeš | Grga | 2 |
| Galiano Pahor | Flavio | 2 |

=== Guest appearances ===
Season 1 (2000-2001)

in alphabetical order

- Ecija Ojdanić - Lucija "Luce"
- Josip Zovko - Jozo
- Ksenija Prohaska - Ljubica
- Marko Svaguša - Švabo
- Mijo Pavelko - vlasnik restorana
- Relja Bašić - stric Miško
- Vida Jerman - Barbara
- Vladimir Krstulović - ravnatelj

Season 2 (2001-2002)

- Barbara Rocco - Barbara
- Boris Svrtan - doktor Marijan
- Damir Markovina - Vjera
- Danko Ljuština - doktor
- Dora Fišter - medicinska sestra
- Dražen Kühn - Čuček
- Ecija Ojdanić - Lucija "Luce"
- Goran Grgić - pater Marko
- Ivana Bolanča - crnka
- Ivana Buljan Legati - voditeljica
- Ivo Gregurević - doktor Jozo
- Jasna Palić-Picukarić - Sanjica
- Josip Zovko - Jozo
- Joško Ševo - ravnatelj
- Kraljevi ulice - Grgini dečki
- Maja Kuljiš - hostesa kviza "Komadić sreće"
- Marina Nemet - profesorica
- Mario Orešković - spiker
- Marko Svaguša - nećak
- Matija Prskalo - Mila
- Milan Štrljić - inspektor
- Nada Klašterka - penzionerka
- Nenad Cvetko - professor #2
- Nikola Novosel - kupac Miško
- Oliver Mlakar - voditelj kviza "Komadić sreće"
- Relja Bašić - Miško
- Severina Vučković - Severina
- Slavko Hita - pijanac Pero
- Stojan Matavulj - Milin muž
- Tarik Filipović - prosjak-voditelj
- Tomislav Kovačević - ulični svirač
- Zoran Čubrilo - professor #1
- Zvonimir Jelačić Bužimski - penzioner Leo
