= Serge Delaive =

Belgian novelist and poet (born 1965)

Serge Delaive (born 1965 in Liège, Belgium) is a poet and novelist writing in the French language. His first novel, Café Europa, made a strong impression on critics. Additionally, his photographs have been featured in exhibitions in Liège (CP-CR), Herstal (City Museum), Amay (Maison de la poésie) and Paris (Librairie Wallonie-Bruxelles, Librairie Itinéraires), Asnières and Padova (Europoems Symposium).

== Published works ==
=== Poetry books ===
- Légendaire, Editions Les Eperonniers, coll. Feux, Bruxelles, 1995.
- Monde jumeau, Editions Les Eperonniers, coll. Feux, Bruxelles, 1996.
- Par l'oeil blessé, L'Arbre à paroles, Amay, 1997.
- Revolver, Editions de l'Acanthe, Namur/Bruxelles, 1999.
- Le livre canoë, Editions de la Différence, coll. Clepsydre, Paris, 2001.
- En rade, Décharge/Gros textes, coll. Polder n°129, Toucy/Châteauroux-les-Alpes, 2006.
- Les jours followed by Ici là, Editions de la Différence, coll. Clepsydre, Paris, 2006 (Marcel Thiry Prize 2007).
- Poèmes sauvages, Maelström éditions, coll. Bookleg n°30, Bruxelles, 2007.
- Le sexe des boeufs, Tétras Lyre, coll. Accordéon, Soumagne, 2008, with an original drawing by Robert Varlez.
- Une langue étrangère, L'Arbre à paroles, Amay, 2008, with an original drawing by Marilu Nordenflycht.
- Art farouche, Editions de la Différence, coll. Clepsydre, Paris, 2011.
- Meuse fleuve nord, poem & photographs, Le Tétras Lyre, Liège, 2014.
- La Trilogie Lunus, anthology, L'Arbre à paroles, Amay, 2015.

=== Novels ===
- Café Europa, Editions de la Différence, Paris, 2004. (Indications Prize 2005). Paperback : Espace Nord, Bruxelles, 2012.
- L'homme sans mémoire, Editions de la Différence, Paris, 2008.
- Argentine, Editions de la Différence, Paris, 2009. (Rossel Prize 2009)Prix Rossel.

=== Nonfiction ===
- Paul Gauguin, étrange attraction, essay, L'Escampette, Chauvigny, 2011.
- Pourquoi je ne serai pas français, Maelström, coll. Bookleg N°79, Bruxelles, 2011.
- Herstal, texts and photographs, Musée de Herstal, Herstal, 2011.
- Carnet de Corée, travel accounts, texts and photographs, Editions de la Différence, Paris, 2012.

=== In anthologies and magazines ===
- La poésie belge, by Alain Bosquet in Nota Bene, n° 41-42-43, printemps 1993, Paris, pp. 291–300.
- Hrvatsko Slovo, newspaper, 19 January 2001, Zagreb, p. 13
- La poésie francophone de Belgique, by Wener Lambersy, Le Cherche Midi éditeur, Paris, 2002, p. 205.
- Poésie1/Vagabondages, n°29, La nouvelle poésie de langue française, Le Cherche Midi éditeur, 2002, Paris, pp. 34–37.
- Knjinzevna Rijeka, n°3, 7th year, chapters of Le temps du rêve translated in Croatian by Ivana Šojat, December 2002, Rijeka, pp. 58–62.
- Encore une journée/Ein Weiterer Tag, bilingual anthology German/French by Rüdiger Fischer, Verlag Im Wald, Rimbach, 2002, pp. 54–67.
- Señas de identidad, bilingual anthology Spanish/French by Sergio Rodriguez, Ediciones Vitruvio, Madrid, 2003, pp. 67–89.
- Ici on parle français & flamand, une fameuse collection de poèmes belges, by Francis Dannemark, Le Castor Astral, coll. Escales du Nord, 2005, Brussels and Bordeaux, p. 71.
- Ceci n’est pas une poésie, een Belgische-Franstalige anthologie, by Benno Barnard, uitgeverij Atlas, Amsterdam, 2005, pp. 539–540.
- Europa Erlesen, Zwischen Fels und Nebel, European anthology by Kevin Perryman et Lojze Wieser, Wieser Verlag, Klagenfurt/Celovec, 2006, p. 155.
- Poètes aujourd’hui, un panorama de la poésie francophone de Belgique, anthology by Liliane Wouters and Yves Namur, Taillis Pré/Le Noroît, Namur/Montreal, 2007.
- L'année poétique 2008, Seghers, Paris, 2008.
- Bélgica – Seis poetas belgas jóvenes de lengua francesa, anthology by Laura Calbrese and Alejo Steimberg, Vox Ediciones, Bahía Blanca, Argentina, 2009.
- L'année poétique 2009, Seghers, Paris, 2009.
- El Jabali, Buenos Aires, 2009.

...
