= Sven Medvešek =

Croatian film and theater actor

- Born: 4 April 1965 (age 61); Zagreb, SR Croatia, Yugoslavia
- Education: Academy of Dramatic Art
- Occupation: Actor
- Years active: 1987–present

Sven Medvešek (born 1965) is a Croatian actor and film director.

Establishing himself as both a leading man and character actor, Medvešek's best-known film roles include Lukas in Slow Surrender (2001), Rafael in Winter in Rio (2002), Marin Držić in Libertas (2006) and Filip in The Show Must Go On (2010). For his role as the troubled killer in Mondo Bobo (1997), Medvešek won critical praise and the Golden Arena for Best Actor.

Since 2008, he has worked as an actor in the drama ensemble of the Gavella Drama Theatre in Zagreb, where he amassed over thirty roles. He has also prominently performed in other theatre, most notably the Croatian National Theatre in Zagreb and the Ulysses Theatre.

== Career ==
A native of Zagreb, he graduated from the Zagreb Academy of Drama Arts.

Since 2008, Medvešek has been an active drama champion in the Gavella Drama Theatre ensemble. Making his debut in a 1987 production of Slobodan Šnajder's Dumanske tišine, Medvešek amassed over thirty award-winning roles in Gavella, including La vida es sueño, Madame Bovary, Othello, Fine Dead Girls, Caligula, U registraturi, Kiklop, Malena and King Richard the Third.

His other notable theatre credits include performances in the Croatian National Theatre in Zagreb, the Zagreb Youth Theatre, the Exit Theatre, the Ulysses Theatre, the Trešnja Theatre, the ITD Theatre, the Žar Ptica Theatre and the Theaterfest Wadgassen. In the Zagreb National Theatre, he starred in productions of Tartuffe, Closely Watched Trains and Troilus and Cressida. He played the title character in an adaptation of Oedipus Rex in the Croatian National Theatre in Split.

Medvešek's most acclaimed film works include Mondo Bobo (1997), Slow Surrender (2001), Winter in Rio (2002), The Sunken Cemetery (2002), Infection (2003), The Recollection Thief (2007), and The Show Must Go On (2010).

While the highly anticipated Veljko Bulajić film Libertas (2006) did not receive considerable success within the box office nor critic circles, Medvešek's portrayal of the famed poet Marin Držić was the target of critical admiration, including praise from Milivoj Jukić and Stipan Matenda.

He has also done acting work for international film and television productions, including Laertes in Rosencrantz and Guildenstern Are Dead and Pietro in Captain America (both 1990).

He starred in the television film Ksaver Šandor Gjalski, as the title writer. Directed and produced by Ante Rozić, his role was praised by linguists and writers who Gjalski has influenced, including Ozren Popović, Ronald Kutlić and Pero Nakić.

He narrated numerous documentaries, audio-books, radio dramas and animated features. He has also appeared in commercials for Coca-Cola, Barcaffe and Vjesnik.

He also holds an active career as a voice actor, being the official Croatian voice for Jacques in the Finding Nemo franchise (2003–2016), Puss in Boots in the Shrek films (2004–2011), Professor Woolensworth in Chicken Little (2005), the Porcupine in Bambi II (2005), Ramses in The Prince of Egypt (2006), Serge in Open Season (2006) and Homer Simpson in The Simpsons (2007). He is the official voice for Mewtwo in Croatian Pokémon media.

== Personal life ==
Apart from his native Croatian, Medvešek fluently speaks English, German, Italian and French.

His older brother Rene is also an actor.

== Selected filmography ==
- Officer with a Rose (Oficir s ružom, 1987)
- Rosencrantz and Guildenstern Are Dead (1990)
- The Seventh Chronicle (Sedma kronika, 1996)
- Mondo Bobo (1997)
- Slow Surrender (Polagana predaja, 2001)
- Winter in Rio (Prezimiti u Riju, 2002)
- The Sunken Cemetery (Potonulo groblje, 2002)
- Infection (Infekcija, 2003)
- Libertas (2006)
- The Recollection Thief (Kradljivac uspomena, 2007)
- The Show Must Go On (2010)
