= Dijana =

Dijana is a given name. Notable people with the name include:

- Dijana Bolanča (born 1974), Croatian actress
- Dijana Budisavljevic (1891–1978), Austrian humanitarian
- Dijana Čuljak, Croatian television host
- Dijana Jovetić (born 1984), Croatian handball player
- Dijana Mugoša (born 1995), Montenegrin handball player
- Dijana Radojević (born 1990), Serbian handball player
- Dijana Ravnikar (born 1978), Slovenian biathlete and Cross-country skier
- Dijana Števin (born 1986), Serbian handballer
- Dijana Ujkić (born 1996), Montenegrin handball player
