= Vida Jerman =

Croatian actress (1939–2011)

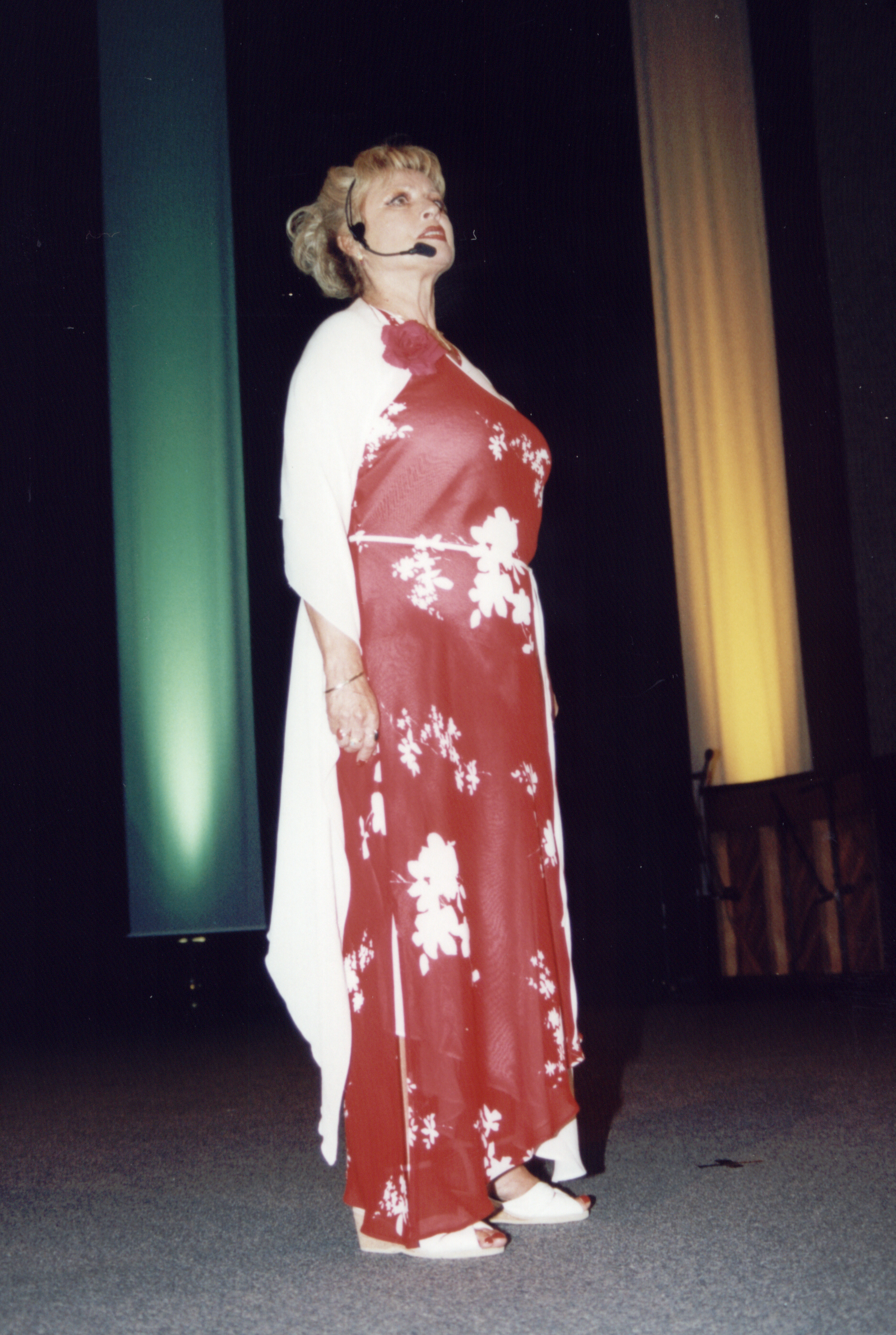
- Born: 28 May 1939; Zagreb, Croatia
- Died: 10 December 2011 (aged 72); Zagreb, Croatia
- Occupation: Actress
- Years active: 1968–2011

Vida Jerman (28 May 1939 – 10 December 2011) was a Croatian theatre, film and television actress. She was also prominent in theatre for Esperanto-speaking community around the world.

She died on 10 December 2011 in Zagreb, after lung cancer.

== Filmography ==
Film
Year	Title	Role	Notes
1964	Svanuće	Djevojka iz restorana	Uncredited
1968	The Valley of Death	Girl in saloon	Uncredited
1970	One Song a Day Takes Mischief Away	Miss Marijana	
1971	Maskarada	Dina	
1971	Romance of a Horsethief	Girl	Uncredited
1973	Little Mother		
1978	Okupacija u 26 slika		
1980	The Woman from Sarajevo		
1981	Find a Way, Comrade	Lenka	
1982	Nemir		
1982	Sophie's Choice	Female SS Guard	
1983	Medeni mjesec		
1985	Transylvania 6-5000	Rear Guard	
1985	The War Boy	Anton's mom	
1986	Obecana zemlja	Konobarica	
1986	Evening Bells	Meirina tetka II	
1987	The Princess Academy	Collette's Governess	
1987	Officer with a Rose	Ljerka	
1988	Sokol Did Not Love Him	Hanžik's wife	
1991	Caruga	Kata	
1991	The Pope Must Die	Glamorous Party Guest	
1992	The Golden Years	Guest #3	
1993	Vrijeme za...		
1994	Vukovar: The Way Home	Jasna Bartulović	
1997	The Third Woman	Kriviceva pratilja	
1999	Četverored	Spiridona Atanašković	
2002	Remembrance of Georgia		
2004	Accidental Co-Traveller	Gospodja #2	
2005	Sleep Sweet, My Darling	Conco's Mother	
2010	Just Between Us	Konobarica	

Television
Year	Title	Role	Notes
1982	Smogovci		
2005-2007	Zabranjena ljubav	Tamara Perišić	
2006	Bibin svijet	Piškorić's wife	
2008	The Proud of Rathkay Family	Mildred	
2009-2010	Dolina sunca	Vinka	
