= Leona Paraminski =

Croatian actress (born 1979)

- Born: 22 August 1979 (age 47); Zagreb, SR Croatia, SFR Yugoslavia (now Croatia)
- Education: Academy of Dramatic Art
- Occupation: Actress
- Years active: 1999–present
- Spouse: Tin Komljenović (m. 2012)

Leona Paraminski (born 22 August 1979) is a Croatian film, theater and television actress. She grew up in Vrbovec, a town near Zagreb, and spent time traveling around Croatia and Germany as a child.

== Biography ==
Leona became interested in the arts and in sports at an early age. Throughout elementary and high school she was part of a drama group; her first role was in a production of Cinderella. During these years she also sang in a choir, actively engaged in a dance group combining modern and classical dances, and was involved in karate and tennis.

By the age of 18 Leona was enrolled in the Academy of Dramatic Art, University of Zagreb (Zagreb Academy of Drama Arts). While she was still at university she won an award F.R.K.A. for best actress in the film Vinko na krovu. Her first appearance in a feature film was in the 1999 film Madonna (Bogorodica, directed by Neven Hitrec). She graduated in 2001. A year later she was honored with the most significant film award in Croatia – Golden Arena for Best Actress – at the 2002 Pula Film Festival in the feature film Winter in Rio (Prezimiti u Riu, 2002).

Since then Leona has acted major roles in over 40 films and TV shows. She performs frequently in the theater in leading roles that portray strong and powerful women. Leona also received three international awards for best actress in Dalibor Matanić's compilation of short films. She has been a TV presenter and is a frequent host at ceremonies and festivals, and is also involved in charitable work.

Leona is a member of the Croatian National Theater. In May 2012 she married Tin Komljenović.

== Selected filmography ==
- Madonna (Bogorodica, 1999)
- Četverored (1999)
- Celestial Body (Nebo, sateliti, 2001)
- Slow Surrender (Polagana predaja, 2001)
- Winter in Rio (Prezimiti u Riu, 2002)
- The Society of Jesus (Družba Isusova, 2004)
- Sex, Drink and Bloodshed (2004)
- True Miracle (Pravo čudo, 2007)
- Shadows over Balkan (Senke nad Balkanom, 2019)
