= Pušća Bistra =

- Directed by: Filip Sovagovic
- Written by: Filip Sovagovic
- Produced by: Ivan Maloca
- Starring: Enes Vejzovic
- Cinematography: Slobodan Trninic
- Release date: 2005
- Running time: 74 minutes
- Country: Croatia
- Language: Croatian

Pušća Bistra is a Croatian comedy film directed by Filip Sovagovic. It was released in 2005.

== Cast ==
- Enes Vejzovic - Pero
- Mladen Vulic - Folnegovic
- Ranko Zidaric - Surla
- Dragan Despot - Tajkun
- Natalija Djordjevic - Mariola
- Jelena Miholjevic - Kuna
- Anja Sovagovic-Despot - Margarinka (as Anja Sovagovic)
- Predrag 'Predjo' Vusovic - Zvonaric
- Zeljko Vukmirica - Timor
- Branko Menicanin - Zamor
- Danko Ljustina - Sef sale
- Bojan Navojec - Portir
- Slavko Brankov - Tuba-Truba
- Nenad Cvetko - Papinjo zdero
