= Ivana Šojat =

Croatian writer from Osijek (born 1971)

- Born: 26 February 1971 (age 55); Osijek, Yugoslavia (now Osijek, Croatia
- Occupations: Novelist, short story writer, poet, editor
- Writing career
- Period: 2000–present
- Genres: Psychological realism, bildungsroman, coming-of-age, short story, poetry, horror
- Notable awards: Order of Danica Hrvatska

Ivana Šojat (born 26 February 1971) is a Croatian writer from Osijek. She published poetry, novellas, essays, short stories and novels, the most famous of which is Unterstadt.

Upon its release, it won several prestigious literary awards, and was adapted and put onstage as a theatrical play.

== Biography ==
Šojat graduated from high school in Osijek with a major in journalism, studied math and physics at Pedagogy Academy in Osijek, and French in Belgium. She worked as a translator, foreign correspondent, columnist, and as an editor of theatrical releases in Croatian National Theatre in Osijek. Most recently, she won the nomination of the Croatian Democratic Union (HDZ) to run for mayor of Osijek in the 2017 local elections.

For her contribution to Croatian literature, she earned distinctive honors and awards. She fought in the Croatian War of Independence.

== Writing ==
Šojat's published works include novels, novellas, short stories, essays, and poetry. Two of her novels have been translated into Macedonian.

As a literary translator, Šojat translated many books from English and French into Croatian. In her works, she often examines the less palatable aspects of human nature including concealed truth, domestic violence, rape, divorce, postwar resentment, ethnic cleansing, etc. In her view,

"What is kept unsaid, swallowed, undigested in a human being, individual, but also in the ethnic, racial, religious and other groups, grows to some sort of a critical mass when the trauma cannot stay confined inside. Then we have shocking news like suicides of the veterans, murders, everything up to wars, massacres, aggression."

In her novel Unterstadt [Lower Town] Šojat traces the struggle of a family from a minority group during times of socio-political upheaval. She builds the plot on historical records regarding a troubled Volksdeutsche family living in Yugoslavia for four generations.

The story has characteristics of realistic fiction, although sources describe it as a bildungsroman as well as a coming of age novel.

The novel Ničiji sinovi [Nobody's Sons] is a story about the disintegration of a family caused by war and alcoholism. The story sheds light on a couple whose marriage falls apart.

The novel Jom Kipur tells the story of a warrior with posttraumatic stress disorder (PTSD). The plot, like in the novel Šamšiel [Shamsiel], intertwines the themes of love and hatred with the horrors of wars and post-war reconciliation.

In Ruke Azazelove [Azazel's Hands] and in the collection of the short stories Emet, Šojat examines the "inner person" in more depth by employing stream of consciousness, interior monologues and flashback narrative to highlight the characters' psychological conflicts exposed through the process of purifying emotions in order to reconcile with the past.

The protagonists in Šojat's stories are highly engaged in the dramatic process of catharsis.

Unterstadt [Lower Town] was adapted and put onstage in Croatian National Theatre in Osijek, and won a prestigious award as the best play in 2012. ZKM Theatre (Zagreb) in co-production with Academy of Dramatic Art, University of Zagreb adapted selective scenes from Unterstadt [Lower Town] and presented them on stage as a play entitled Elza hoda kroz zidove [Elza walks through the walls] in 2015.

== Honors ==
- Red Danice hrvatske s likom Marka Marulića [Order of Danica Hrvatska with Face of Marko Marulić], medal of the President of the Republic of Croatia for promoting Croatian culture domestically and abroad, 2016
- Pečat Grada Osijeka [Stamp of the City of Osijek], a public recognition for exceptional contribution to literature, 2011

== Awards ==
- Ksaver Šandor Gjalski, 2010, novel Unterstadt [Lower Town]
- Fran Galović, 2010, novel Unterstadt
- Josip i Ivan Kozarac, 2010, novel Unterstadt
- Vladimir Nazor, 2009, novel Unterstadt
- Blaženi Ivan Merz, 2005, poetry Utvare [Apparitions]
- Kozarčevi dani [Kozarac Days], 2002, novel Šamšiel [Shamsiel]

== Bibliography ==
- Novel Ezan, Fraktura Zagreb, 2018, ISBN 9789533580524
- Poetry Ljudi ne znaju šutjeti [People Don't Know to Keep Silent], Fraktura Zagreb, 2016, ISBN 9789532668087
- Short stories Emet i druge priče [Emet and Other Stories], Fraktura Zagreb, 2016, ISBN 9789532667905
- Novel Jom Kipur [Yom Kippur], Fraktura Zagreb, 2014, ISBN 9789532665987
- Novel Ničiji sinovi [Nobody's Sons], Fraktura Zagreb, 2012, ISBN 9789532664133
- Novellas Ruke Azazelove [Azazel's Hands], Fraktura Zagreb, 2011, ISBN 9789532663471
- Novel Unterstadt [Lower Town], Fraktura Zagreb, 2009 ISBN 9789532661163
- Novellas Mjesečari [Sleepwalkers], Fraktura Zagreb, 2008, ISBN 9789532660739
- Poetry Sofija plaštevima mete samoću [Sofija Sweeps Loneliness With Cloaks], V.B.Z. Zagreb, 2008, ISBN 9789532019353
- Essays I past će sve maske [And All Masks Will Drop], Alfa Zagreb, 2006, ISBN 9531687056
- Short stories Kao pas [Like a Dog], DHK Rijeka, 2006, ISBN 9536879530
- Poetry Utvare [Apparitions], Solidarnost Zagreb, 2005, ISBN 9539921228
- Poetry Uznesenja [Ascensions], Triler i DHK Rijeka, 2003, ISBN 9536879182
- Novel Šamšiel [Shamsiel], Matica hrvatska Osijek, 2002, ISBN 953613778X
- Poetry Hiperbole [Hyperboles], Hrašće Drenovci, 2000, ISBN 9536538113
