= Krsto Papić =

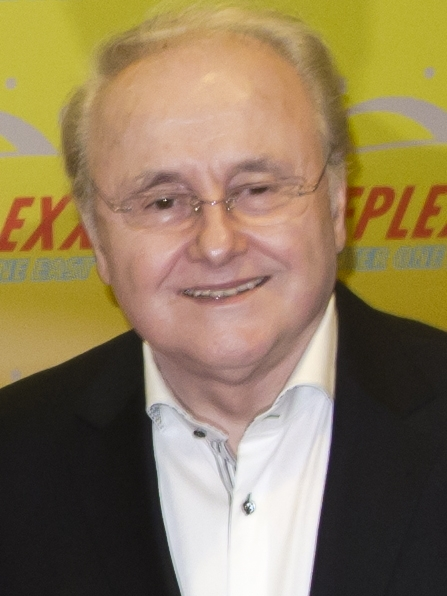
- Papić in March 2012
- Born: 7 December 1933; Vučji Do, Yugoslavia
- Died: 7 February 2013 (aged 79); Zagreb, Croatia
- Occupations: Screenwriter; film director
- Years active: 1965–2012
- Spouse: Jadranka Štefanac (m. 1990)
- Children: 2
- Awards: Berlin Golden Bear for Best Film; Nominated 1974 A Village Performance of Hamlet; Golden Arena for Best Director; 1970 Handcuffs; 1992 Story from Croatia; 1998 When the Dead Start Singing; Fantasporto Award; 1982 The Redeemer

Krsto Papić (7 December 1933 – 7 February 2013) was a Croatian screenwriter and film director whose career spanned over five decades. He is generally considered among the best directors of former Yugoslavia, and counted among the Yugoslav Black Wave.

== Biography ==
Papić was born in Vučji Do, near Nikšić in today's Montenegro. His early feature films and documentaries were part of Croatian and Yugoslav New Cinema, and often regarded as Croatian echo of the Black Wave artistic movement that mostly took place within Serbia. Additionally, Papić himself was connected to the Croatian Spring political movement during the early 1970s. He was the member of the Zagreb filmophile circle influenced by the French New Wave, so-called "Hitchcockians", along with film-makers and critics Ante Peterlić, Zoran Tadić, Branko Ivanda, Petar Krelja and centered on film critics Vladimir Vuković and Hrvoje Lisinski. Papić's two best-known early feature films, Lisice and Predstava Hamleta u Mrduši Donjoj, were often attacked from the government sources. Lisice did not get permission to represent Yugoslavia in the Cannes Film Festival, so it entered the Quinzaine program in 1970. Izbavitelj was heavily criticised by Stipe Šuvar, who alluded that film's allegory about fascism actually also refers to the communism.

Papić's subsequent feature films were more classical in their narration, but again politically controversial. Particularly My Uncle's Legacy, a critical film about Yugoslavia's political situation under Titoism during Informbiro period, (nominated for the Golden Globe in 1989) was surrounded by controversy and political attacks from traditional Party circles and especially Partisan Veterans' organisations, leading to a delay of production.

Papić was awarded with Croatia's highest Vladimir Nazor Award for live achievement in cinema in 2006, and with Grand Prix Special des Amériques (for exceptional contribution to the cinematographic art) in 2004.

He died in Zagreb on 7 February 2013 after a battle with stomach cancer, aged 79.

== Filmography ==
- 1965 – The Key (Ključ) – An omnibus film with sections directed by Vanča Kljaković, Krsto Papić and Antun Vrdoljak; Papić's segment is titled Waiting (Čekati).
- 1967 – Illusion (Iluzija)
- 1969 – Handcuffs (Lisice) – entered Quinzaine
- 1973 – A Performance of Hamlet in the Village of Mrdusa Donja (Predstava Hamleta u selu Mrduša Donja – entered official selection of the Berlin Film Festival
- 1976 – The Rat Savior (Izbavitelj) – also known as "The Redeemer" - first prize at the Trieste International Science Fiction Film Festival in 1977 and at Fantasporto in 1982
- 1980 – The Secret of Nikola Tesla (Tajna Nikole Tesle) – in English language
- 1988 – My Uncle's Legacy (Život sa stricem) – nominated for the Golden Globe Award (Best Foreign Language Film)
- 1991 – Story from Croatia (Priča iz Hrvatske) – also known under distributor's title Idaho Potato
- 1999 – When the Dead Start Singing (Kad mrtvi zapjevaju)
- 2003 – Infection (Infekcija) – remake of The Redeemer
- 2012– Flower Square (Cvjetni trg)
