= Tomislav Zografski =

Macedonian composer (1934–2000)

- Born: 29 March 1934; Veles, Kingdom of Yugoslavia
- Died: 14 January 2000 (aged 65); Skopje, Macedonia
- Education: Music Academy in Belgrade, Yugoslavia
- Occupations: Composer; Music pedagogue
- Notable work: Sinfonietta in E-flat, Passacaglia
- Website: www.zografski.org

Tomislav Zografski (Macedonian: Томислав Зографски, 29 March 1934 – 14 January 2000) was a Macedonian composer and music pedagogue who also wrote music for film and television. His neoclassical language played a key part in the journey of Macedonian music toward the postmodern era. Zografski's musical language was not archetypal of neoclassical folklore-inspired pastiche but instead more the result of him venturing into the examination and development of more exemplar traditional repertoire in a way that was unconventional and compelling and which retained transformed elements from an earlier period.

Zografski was born in Veles, Kingdom of Yugoslavia (now Macedonia) on 29 March 1934. He studied music at Skopje Music School and Belgrade Music School and composition at the Music Academy in Belgrade. In 1967 he became professor at the faculty of music at Ss. Cyril and Methodius University of Skopje.

== Awards ==
- 1961 First Prize, Union of Youth Competition for Suite for piano solo
- 1962 City’s Committee of SMM Award for Suite for piano
- 1962 City’s Committee of SMM Award for Suite for violin and piano
- 1969 First Prize, University Skopje Competition for In Praise of Cyril and Methodius
- 1969 ″11 October″ Award for In Praise of Cyril and Methodius
- 1972 First Prize of Yugoslav Radio Festival for Molitva
- 1973 Golden Arena (Film Music Award) for Ukleti smo, Irina
- 1979 First Prize, Award of RTV (MRT) Skopje for Madrigals
- 1979 First Prize, Award of RTV (MRT) Skopje for Karaorman Cantata
- 1980 TEHO (Tetovo Choir Festival) Award for Vardar
- 1981 TEHO (Tetovo Choir Festival) Award for Dojdovme
- 1981 ″13 November″ Award of City of Skopje for Passacaglia
- 1991 ″Panche Peshev″, Macedonian Composers′ Association (SOKOM) Award for Scherzo
- 1991 ″Panche Peshev″, Macedonian Composers′ Association (SOKOM) Award for Sonata for two pianos
- 1994 Winner of the State ″11 October″ Achievement Award
- 1997 Trajko Prokopiev Macedonian Composers′ Association (SOKOM) Lifetime Achievement Award

== Selected works ==
- Invention Syrinx for flute solo, Op. 8 (1954–5)
- Ten miniatures for piano, Op. 11
- Sonata for bassoon and piano, Op. 17 (1958)
- Suite, Op. 27 (1960)
- Nine Miniatures: for symphony orchestra (1961)
- Suite for solo piano, Op. 27 (1961)
- Suite for violin and piano, Op. 28 (1962)
- Scripts for baritone and piano, Op. 39 (1963)
- Fantasia corale (1967)
- String Quartet, Op. 58 (1968)
- Sonatina in C for two pianos, Op. 142 (1969)
- In Praise of Cyril and Methodius (1969)
- Cantus Coronatus (1969)
- Siyaniem for soloist and mixed choir, Op. 74 (1972)
- Allegro barrocco for two violins and piano (1973)
- Passacaglia, symphonic poem (1981)
- Essay on the Rain — song cycle for voice and piano (1982)
- Compositions for viola and violin, violin and piano, Opp. 100–103 (1982–83)
- Song for solo violin, Op. 101 (1983)
- Songs for Jakshini for voice and piano (1983)
- Scherzo for symphony orchestra (1985)
- Rhapsody for violin and piano, Op. 103
- Three Lyrical Chants, Op. 107 (1985)
- Sonata for two pianos, Op. 122 (1990)
- Skherzo (1991)
- Five pieces for clarinet, Op. 131 (1997)
- Sinfonietta in E-flat
- Sinfonietta in B
- Ballade for piano
- "Marika Beautiful Girl" — (homage to P. I. Tchaikovsky) for soprano and piano

=== Music for film and television ===
- Pod isto nebo (1964)
- Denovi na iskusenie (1965)
- Zalez nad ezerskata zemja (6 episodes) (1973)
- Kolnati sme, Irina (1973)
- The Longest Journey (1976)
- The Verdict (1977)
- Najdolgiot pat (1977)
- Beliot sid (1978)
- Kliment Ohridski (1986)
