= Lucija Šerbedžija =

Croatian actress and model

- Born: 8 June 1973 (age 53); Zagreb, SR Croatia, Yugoslavia (now Croatia)
- Other name: Lucija Sherbedgia
- Occupation: Actress
- Years active: 1993–present
- Spouse: Filip Gajić (m. 2006; div. 2014)
- Children: 2
- Parents: Rade Šerbedžija (father); Ivanka Cerovac (mother)
- Relatives: Danilo Šerbedžija (brother)

Lucija Šerbedžija (born 8 June 1973) is a Croatian actress and model. She is probably best known in the English-speaking world for her role in The Saint as a Russian prostitute, in which her father, Rade Šerbedžija, also starred.

She is a winner of two Golden Arena awards for Best Actress; in 1999 (Madonna) and 2001 (for Slow Surrender).

== Filmography ==
- Mondo Bobo (1997)
- The Saint (1997)
- Madonna (1999)
- Celestial Body (2001)
- Slow Surrender (2001)
- Remake (2003)
- Infection (2003)
- 72 Days (2010)
