= Đuka Begović =

- Directed by: Branko Schmidt
- Written by: Branko Schmidt; Fabijan Šovagović
- Based on: Đuka Begović by Ivan Kozarac
- Starring: Slobodan Ćustić; Fabijan Šovagović; Asja Jovanović; Filip Šovagović; Zaim Muzaferija; Mustafa Nadarević
- Cinematography: Goran Trbuljak
- Edited by: Vesna Lazeta
- Production companies: Zagreb Film; Croatian Radiotelevision
- Release date: July 1991
- Running time: 102 min
- Language: Croatian

Đuka Begović is a Croatian film directed by Branko Schmidt. It was released in 1991. This film is based on Ivan Kozarac's novel which tells the life of a fictional character named Đuka from childhood to his material and spiritual ruin.
