= The Rat Savior =

The Rat Saviour
- Izbavitelj
- Directed by: Krsto Papić
- Written by: Ivo Brešan; Krsto Papić; Zoran Tadić (based on the novel by Alexander Grin)
- Starring: Ivica Vidović; Mirjana Majurec; Relja Bašić; Ilija Ivezić; Fabijan Šovagović; Branko Špoljar
- Cinematography: Ivica Rajković
- Edited by: Miroslava Kapić; Žana Gerova
- Music by: Brane Živković
- Production company: Jadran Film
- Release date: 26 October 1976
- Running time: 83 minutes
- Country: SFR Yugoslavia
- Language: Croatian

The Rat Saviour (Croatian: Izbavitelj) or The Redeemer is a 1976 Croatian fantasy horror film directed by Krsto Papić. It was awarded as the best film at the 1977 International Science Fiction Film Festival in Trieste, the 1980 Paris International Festival of Fantastic and Science-Fiction Film and 1982 Fantasporto. The film was selected as the Yugoslav entry for the Best Foreign Language Film at the 49th Academy Awards, but was not accepted as a nominee.

In 1999, a poll of Croatian film critics found it to be one of the best Croatian films ever made.

In 2003, Papić directed sequel or/and remake, titled Infection (Infekcija).

== Plot ==
A man uncovers a race of intelligent rats who can appear as human. He is captured and taken to the rat people's leader (the "savior" of the movie's title). He escapes, but then wonders who among his fellow humans is a rat person in disguise.

== Cast ==
- Ivica Vidović – Ivan Gajski
- Mirjana Majurec – Sonja Bošković
- Fabijan Šovagović – Professor Martin Bošković
- Relja Bašić – Mayor
- Ilija Ivezić – Police Chief

== See also ==
- List of submissions to the 49th Academy Awards for Best Foreign Language Film
- List of Yugoslav submissions for the Academy Award for Best Foreign Language Film
