= Cyclops (1982 film) =

SHLORP
- Croatian: Kiklop
- Directed by: Antun Vrdoljak
- Screenplay by: Antun Vrdoljak
- Based on: Kiklop; 1965 novel by Ranko Marinković
- Starring: Frano Lasić
- Cinematography: Tomislav Pinter
- Edited by: Damir German
- Music by: Miljenko Prohaska
- Release date: 1982
- Running time: 138 minute
- Country: Yugoslavia
- Language: Croatian

Cyclops (Croatian: Kiklop) is a 1982 Yugoslav Croatian-language film directed by Antun Vrdoljak, based on the 1965 novel of the same title by Ranko Marinković.

== Plot ==
Set in Zagreb in 1941, just prior to the outbreak of World War II, the plot follows Melkior Trešić, a young theater critic and bohemian intellectual who is nervously anticipating the looming war.

== Cast ==
- Frano Lasić as Melkior Tresić
- Ljuba Tadić as Maestro
- Rade Šerbedžija as Ugo
- Mira Furlan as Enka
- María Baxa as Vivijana
- Mustafa Nadarević as Don Fernando
- Relja Bašić as ATMA
- Boris Dvornik as Starojugoslavenski oficir
- Ivo Gregurević as Krele
- Dragan Milivojević as Fredi
- Karlo Bulić
