= Hamburg Altona (film) =

1989 Yugoslav film

- Directed by: Mladen Mitrović; Vedran Mihletić; Dragutin Krencer
- Produced by: Dragutin Krencer; Vedran Mihletić
- Starring: Željko Vukmirica; Mirsad Zulić; Filip Šovagović
- Cinematography: Tihomil Beritić; Goran Mećava; Željko Sarić
- Production companies: Avala Film; Urania Film
- Release date: 1 August 1989 (Yugoslavia)
- Running time: 107 minutes
- Country: Yugoslavia
- Language: Serbo-Croatian/YU

Hamburg Altona is a 1989 Yugoslav anthology film directed by Mladen Mitrović, Vedran Mihletić and Dragutin Krencer.

== Plot ==
Three inmates, Čombe (Željko Vukmirica), Menso (Mirsad Zulić) and Bogart (Filip Šovagović), escape from prison to go to Hamburg, their dream destination. Before they temporarily split and go to their respective towns, they agree to meet in Zagreb and board the train to Hamburg together.

From that point on, the film develops into three separate plots: in Rijeka, Čombe attempts to get even with Mrva, his former partner in crime who betrayed him, Menso is spending time with his wife and children in a Bosnian village, while Bogart starts a romance with a handsome teacher in the outskirts of Belgrade.

Upon learning from the newspapers that his two comrades have been arrested, Bogart makes a last-minute change in his plan...

== Reception ==
Hamburg Altona, the feature film debut for the three young directors, received mixed reviews from the critics. They criticized the screenplay and direction for being somewhat clichéd and predictable, but found the mix of crime film and melodrama interesting.

== Sources ==
- Hamburg Altona at hrfilm.hr (in Croatian)
