= My Uncle's Legacy =

- Croatian: Život sa stricem
- Directed by: Krsto Papić
- Written by: Ivan Aralica; Mate Matišić; Krsto Papić
- Based on: Okvir za mržnju by Ivan Aralica
- Produced by: Branko Baletić; Tomislav Milanović; Ben Stassen
- Starring: Davor Janjić; Alma Prica; Miodrag Krivokapić; Branislav Lečić; Anica Dobra; Ivo Gregurević; Filip Šovagović; Fabijan Šovagović
- Cinematography: Boris Turković
- Edited by: Robert Lisjak
- Music by: Brane Živković
- Production companies: CFS Avala Film; Kinematografi; Stassen Productions; Urania Film
- Distributed by: International Film Exchange (1990) (USA)
- Release date: 7 April 1988 (Yugoslavia)
- Running time: 116 minutes
- Country: Yugoslavia
- Language: Serbo-Croatian

My Uncle's Legacy (Croatian: Život sa stricem) is a 1988 Yugoslav drama film directed by Krsto Papić, starring Davor Janjić, Alma Prica, Miodrag Krivokapić, Branislav Lečić, Anica Dobra and Ivo Gregurević. It is based on Okvir za mržnju, a novel by Ivan Aralica.

== Overview ==
"In the story, Martin is a schoolboy with a sense of the absurd and a willingness to use ridicule to amuse himself and his classmates. He has an uncle who is high up in the nation’s bureaucracy who protects him and his grandfather now that his father has died. His grandfather is too stubborn to give his farm to the local farming collective, and Martin himself is in hot water with the principal for making fun of his girlfriend, one of the students at the high school. However, as long as the uncle is able to protect them, they remain out of hot water."

== Cast ==
- Davor Janjić as Martin Kujundžić
- Alma Prica as Marta
- Miodrag Krivokapić as Stjepan Kujundžić
- Branislav Lečić as Vinko Maglica
- Anica Dobra as Korina Kužina
- Ivo Gregurević as Comrade Radojica
- Filip Šovagović as Ivan Babarović
- Nenad Srdelić as Klepo
- Ilija Zovko as School Master
- Ivan Bibalo as Bepo
- Dejan Ačimović as Markan
- Darko Vladetić as Mato

== Awards ==
The film won the Golden Arena for Best Film at the 1988 Pula Festival of Yugoslav Film, along with the Golden Gate of Pula Audience Award, and was later nominated for the 1990 Golden Globe Award for Best Foreign Language Film. The film was also selected as the Yugoslav entry for the Best Foreign Language Film at the 61st Academy Awards, but was not accepted as a nominee.

== See also ==
- List of submissions to the 61st Academy Awards for Best Foreign Language Film
- List of Yugoslav submissions for the Academy Award for Best Foreign Language Film
