= Infection (2003 film) =

- Directed by: Krsto Papić
- Written by: Mate Matišić; Krsto Papić
- Starring: Leon Lučev; Lucija Šerbedžija; Sven Medvešek
- Cinematography: Goran Trbuljak
- Edited by: Robert Lisjak
- Music by: Alan Bjelinski; Mate Matišić
- Release date: 22 July 2003
- Running time: 105 min
- Country: Croatia
- Language: Croatian

Infection (Infekcija) is a 2003 Croatian film directed by Krsto Papić. It has been described as both a sequel and a remake of The Rat Savior, Papić's 1976 film.

== Cast ==
- Leon Lučev – Ivan Gajski
- Lucija Šerbedžija – Sara
- Sven Medvešek – Professor Bošković
- Filip Šovagović – The Mayor
- Dražen Kühn – The Director
- Ivo Gregurević – Muller
- Božidar Alić – General Genz
- Vili Matula – Karlo
- Dejan Aćimović – Master of Ceremony
- Boris Miholjević – The Inspector
- Ana Karić – Mrs. Rudolph
- Slavko Juraga
- Vanja Drach
- Nada Gačešić
