= Filip Šovagović =

Croatian actor, film director, comedian, playwright and journalist

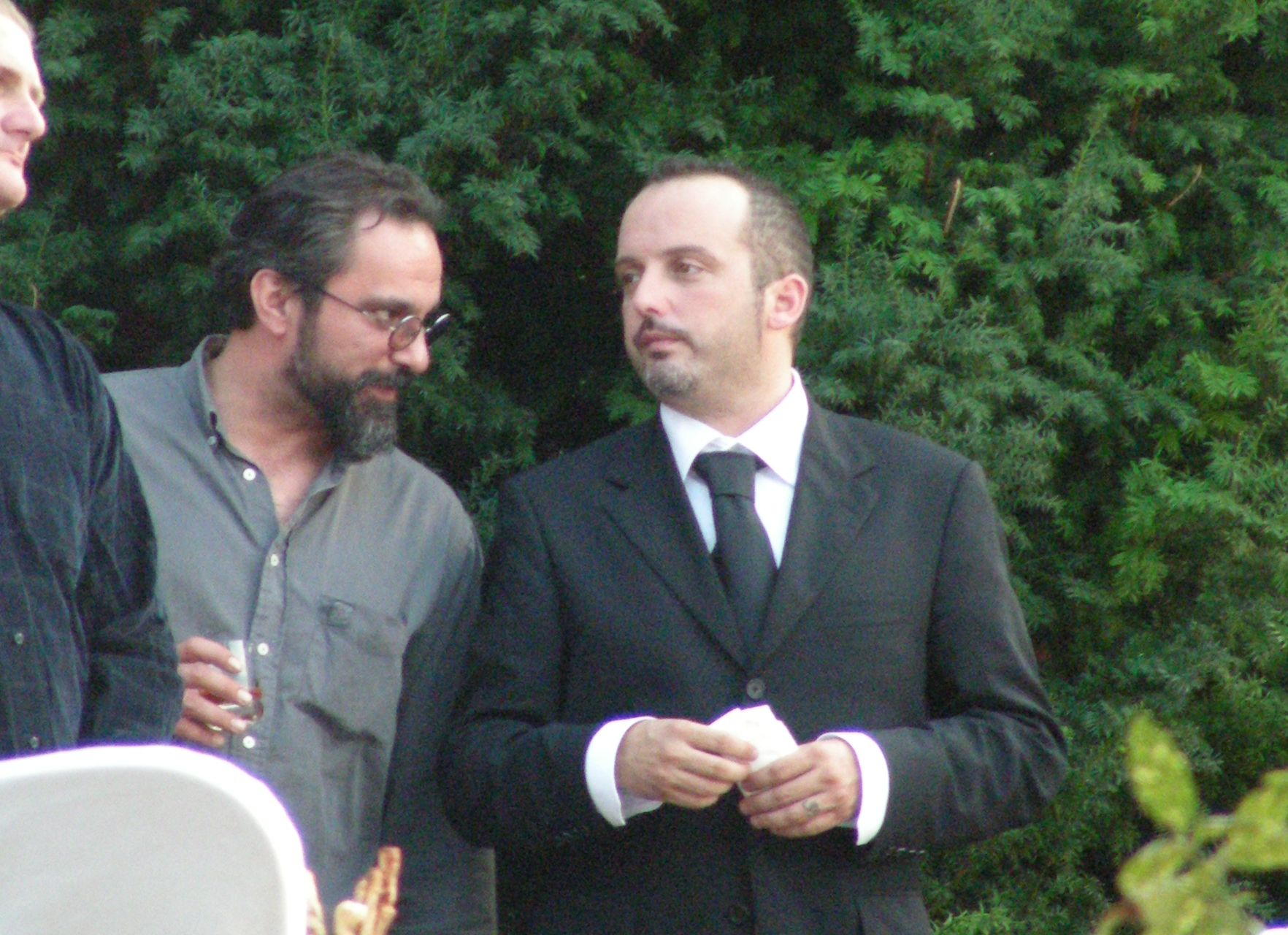
- Šovagović (left) with Tony Cetinski, 2007
- Born: 13 September 1966 (age 59); Zagreb, SR Croatia, SFR Yugoslavia
- Education: Academy of Dramatic Art
- Alma mater: University of Zagreb
- Occupations: Actor; playwright; journalist
- Years active: 1988–present
- Spouse: Ruža Grizelj (m. 1992; div. 1997)
- Children: 1
- Father: Fabijan Šovagović
- Relatives: Anja Šovagović-Despot (sister)

Filip Šovagović (born 13 September 1966) is a Croatian actor, film director, comedian, playwright and journalist. At first known simply as the son of renowned actor Fabijan Šovagović, he has established himself as one of the most prolific Croatian actors of the 21st century.

He has appeared in over sixty films, starring in My Uncle's Legacy, Sokol Did Not Love Him, Hamburg Altona, Četverored, Transatlantic, The Infection and the Academy Award-winning No Man's Land. Šovagović also starred in the extremely successful Croatian comedy series Naša mala klinika as Ivo Zadro. He made his directorial début in 2005, with the film Pušća Bistra.

Šovagović has also been widely praised for his acting work in the Gavella Drama Theatre and as a playwright in his repertoire of five authored plays. His most acclaimed work, The Brick, has won the 2002 Prix Italia. He writes a column in the Croatian daily newspaper 24 sata.

== Career ==
=== Film ===
In 1988, he appeared in My Uncle's Legacy, marking his film debut. The film, based on the Ivan Aralica novel Okvir za mržnju, was nominated for a 1990 Golden Globe Award for Best Foreign Language Film. He later appeared as Ilija in the 1991 Đuka Begović adaptation, directed by Branko Schmidt.

In 1995, he starred in the Zrinko Ogresta-directed Washed Out. The film was the Croatian submission for the Academy Award for Best International Feature Film in 1995 and had garnered positive reviews. For the role, Šovagović won the Golden Arena for Best Actor at the Pula Film Festival.

He would later win Golden Arenas for Best Actor for his roles in Transatlantic and Slow Surrender. In 1995, Šovagović portrayed the smooth-talking Spanish television star Juan in the celebrated box-office hit The Three Men of Melita Žganjer.

Opposite Rene Bitorajac and Branko Đurić, he had a starring role in No Man's Land, a motion picture that won the Academy Award for Best International Feature Film.

In 2005, he directed the comedy Pušća Bistra, starring Enes Vejzović. With a screenplay based on Šovagović's cult play Cigla (The Brick), the film earned praised for its dialogue, directing and humor, but received criticism towards the acting performances.

=== Theatre ===
He graduated from the Academy of Dramatic Art at the University of Zagreb, and holds a Master of Fine Arts degree in theatre directing.

Since 1995, he has been a member of the ensemble in the Gavella Drama Theatre in Zagreb. Some of his notable acting credits in the theatre include adaptations of Three Sisters, Peer Gynt, Antigone, Richard III, Fine Dead Girls, Iliad 2001, A Midsummer Night's Dream, Revisor, Turandot, Cyclops and The Imaginary Invalid. He was nominated for an Apollo Award at the Novi Sad Culture Festival for his starring role in Popcorn, by Ben Elton. In 2017, he directed his own play Tesla Anonimus, starring Ozren Grabarić. The play was met with positive reviews, with many critics praising the concept, characters and score, composed by Šovagović himself. In 2019, he appeared as chiromancer ATMA in the Gavella rendition of the Marinković classic Kiklop. In 2021, Šovagović co-directed Zagreb 2020 with Dubravko Mihanović.

Apart from his performances in the Gavella theatre, he has performed in Croatian National Theatre in Split, The Rector's Palace in Dubrovnik and Theatre &TD. He has also directed Samuel Beckett's Waiting For Godot in the Zagreb-based theatre &TD.

=== Television ===
On television, he is widely known as gaffe-prone hypochondriac Ivo Zadro in the massively successful Croatian comedy series Naša mala klinika. The show, created by Branko Đurić, has spawned an entire franchise with Slovenian, Croatian and Serbian counterparts. He has also done supporting roles for the comedy Lud, zbunjen, normalan, the improv series Moja tri zida, the children's show Žutokljunac and the dark comedy Dome, slatki dome.

In 2012, on behalf of the "Sova Zone" project, he created, produced and starred in the sitcom Špica, in hopes of "capturing the contrast and dynamics of the Zagreb society". The series also stars Ornela Vištica, Mia Biondić, Nenad Cvetko, Ranko Zidarić, Živko Anočić, Luka Peroš, Jure Radnić, Vera Ana Goldstein and Ankica Dobrić.

Since 2018, he stars in the prominent Serbian series Žigosani u reketu.

=== Animation ===
He is the official Croatian-language voice of Garfield, and provided the voice of Baloo in the Croatian dub of The Jungle Book and the sequel. His other notable Croatian version voice credits are the second Ram in Brother Bear, Bruce in Finding Nemo (both 2003), The Underminer in the Incredibles franchise (2004–2018), Captain Hook in Shrek the Third, Big Z in Surf's Up, Django in Ratatouille (all 2007), Buford in The Princess and the Frog (2009), Lighting and Anton Harrison in Marmaduke (2010), Mike in Hotel Transylvania 2 (2015), Hank in Finding Dory and Jerry Jumbeaux Jr. in Zootopia (both 2016). He also provided the voice roles of all characters (the Narrator, the Sheep and the Jackalope) in the 2004 short film Boundin'. He voiced Fillmore in Cars (2006) and Cars 3 (2017), with the character being voiced by Rakan Rushaidat in Cars 2 (2011).

=== Music ===
In 2021, Šovagović announced that he is finishing works on his band's first vinyl record. The band features Franjo Dijak, Robert Domitrović, Vid Adam Hribar, Stanko Kovačić, Fadil Abdulov, and Goran Navojec.

== Personal life ==
Šovagović, nicknamed Šova and Šovica, resides in Zagreb. His sister, Anja Šovagović-Despot, is also an actress working in the Gavella theatre. From 1992 to 1997, he was married to Ruža Grizelj, with whom he has a daughter named Klara. In 2019, it was reported that he was in a relationship with actress Nina Violić.

== Selected filmography ==
- My Uncle's Legacy (1988)
- The Three Men of Melita Zganjer (1998)
- Četverored (1999)
- No Man's Land (2001)
- The Last Will (2001)
- Pušća Bistra (2005)
- The Melon Route (2006)
- The Living and the Dead (2007)
- Metastases (2009)
- Love Life of a Gentle Coward (2009)
- Josef (2011)
- Inspector Martin and the Gang of Snails (2012)
- Visoka modna napetost (2013)
