= When the Dead Start Singing =

- Croatian: Kad mrtvi zapjevaju
- Directed by: Krsto Papić
- Written by: Krsto Papić
- Based on: Cinco i Marinko by Mate Matišić
- Cinematography: Vjekoslav Vrdoljak
- Edited by: Robert Lisjak
- Music by: Zrinko Tutić
- Release date: 1998
- Running time: 99 minute
- Country: Croatia

When the Dead Start Singing (Croatian: Kad mrtvi zapjevaju) is a Croatian feature film directed by Krsto Papić. It was released in 1998.

== Cast ==
- Ivo Gregurević – Cinco Kapulica
- Ivica Vidović – Marinko
- Mirjana Majurec – Maca Kapulica
- Ksenija Pajić – Stana
- Matija Prskalo – Cinco's daughter
- Boris Miholjević – Dr. Lučić
- Žarko Savić - Vlajko
- Dražen Kühn - Ante
