= Anja Šovagović-Despot =

Croatian actress (born 1963)

- Born: Anja Šovagović; 25 March 1963 (age 63); Zagreb, SR Croatia, SFR Yugoslavia (now Croatia)
- Education: Zagreb Academy of Dramatic Art
- Occupation: Actress
- Years active: 1982–present
- Spouse: Dragan Despot (m. 1986)
- Children: 2
- Parents: Fabijan Šovagović (father); Maja Blaškov (mother)
- Relatives: Filip Šovagović (brother)

Anja Šovagović-Despot (born 25 March 1963) is a Croatian film and stage actress.

== Early life and career ==
Šovagović-Despot was born to the family of Fabijan Šovagović, one of the most respected Croatian actors, and Maja Blaškov. Same as her younger brother, Filip, she pursued the acting career from an early age. After high school she enrolled in the Zagreb Academy of Dramatic Art. There, together with theatre director Krešimir Dolenčić, she founded the "Lift" theatre group in 1981. Two years later she joined Zlatko Vitez and his "Histrion" theatre company. In 1986 she finally settled down in Gavella Drama Theatre.

== Personal life ==
Šovagović-Despot is married to Croatian actor, Dragan Despot. The couple has two children. She supported Croatian Democratic Union (HDZ) in 2015.

== Selected filmography ==
- Stela (1990)
- Slow Surrender (2001)
- Below the Line (2003)
- What Iva Recorded (2005)
- Behind the Glass (2008)
- Kotlovina (2011)
