= The Sunken Cemetery =

The Sunken Cemetery (Croatian: Potonulo groblje) is a 2002 Croatian film directed by Mladen Juran. Nomination Melies d'Or Award for Best European Film of Fantasy. The screenplay is based on the novel of the same name by Goran Tribuson - screenwriter with Mladen Juran - collaboration of Oscar-winner Jiri Menzel.

Film "Sunken Cemetery", 2002 - a surrealistic depiction of this time of war disaster in Croatia in the nineties: "The Horror of Mladen Juran The sunken cemetery that won the Sci-Fi festival in Brussels portrays a middle-aged man who returns to (...) ... the development of the drama, upgraded to thriller elements and occasional comedy or grotesque situations. The director takes the film with an extraordinary sense of rhythm, refined eye for detail, creating true characters. Despite the provocative theme, this is about unsurpassed quality. "- Andre Deutsch, Variety, 2004." This is a very ambitious project, then a very original project because the story does not go into a technological (eg electronic) range like today's fantasy because it is a fan of "spiritual" and, finally, because it is original, even very original, contributes to the trend of fantasy in the dimensions of know at the expense of Croatia. " - from Ante Peterlić's prof. dr. About the film "has a peculiar atmosphere, a terrible atmosphere, in the milestone of returnees' emigrants in the catastrophic homeland, the post-totalitarian situation of the nineteen, the modern and demonic time of each catharsis - in the style of the best American noir movies," wrote film critics Mate Curić , Bruno Kragić, Frank Lafond. With the subtle interpretation of Sven Medvešek and Barbara Nola, and the screenplay and acting collaboration of Oscar-winner Jiri Menzel, the film was nominated for the Melies d'Or Award - the Best European Fiction Film - Brussels 2003.

== Plot ==
After many years spent abroad, Ivan (Sven Medvešek), a man in his early forties returns to the town of his birth. He is trying to solve the mystery of his childhood, of which he has no memory. He starts by attempting to find his mother's grave, but the local cemetery is underwater, having been flooded by a nearby river. Ivan decides to stay in the town and find a job. Since his family home has been demolished, he moves into a house owned by an eccentric woman named Marilyn (Barbara Nola), and starts an intimate relationship with her. Soon he learns that Marilyn has a secret too, and so do the other locals... Nomination Melies d'Or Award for Best European Film of Fantasy, (6 Candidates), 2003 Official Competition International Festival of Fantasy Film, Brussels (Final Festival of Fiction Festivals), 2003.
