= Love Life of a Gentle Coward =

- Directed by: Pavo Marinković
- Written by: Pavo Marinković
- Starring: Nenad Cvetko; Dijana Vidušin
- Production companies: Alka Film; Croatian Radiotelevision
- Release dates: 24 July 2009 (PFF); 22 April 2010 (Croatia)
- Running time: 85 minutes
- Country: Croatia
- Language: Croatian

Love Life of a Gentle Coward (Croatian: Ljubavni život domobrana) is a 2009 Croatian comedy film directed by Pavo Marinković. It won three awards at the 2009 Pula Film Festival.

== Plot ==
Saša Mihelčić is a journalist and a failed writer in his early thirties. He scrapes a living by writing a newspaper column on gastronomy, inherited from his father, a journalism legend. His listless existence is changed when he meets Ines, a former volleyball player who works as a masseuse in his gym. They begin a romantic relationship, and - wanting to show himself as a man of character for once - he writes a scathing review of a restaurant owned by Braco, a politically influential investor. This lands Saša in serious trouble, forcing him to face and overcome the weaker points of his character...

== Cast ==
- Nenad Cvetko - Saša
- Dijana Vidušin - Ines
- Siniša Popović - Mladen
- Jan Budař - Honza
- Filip Šovagović - Filip
- Zoran Čubrilo - Braco
