= Transatlantic (1998 film) =

1998 film by Mladen Juran

- Directed by: Mladen Juran
- Written by: Mladen Juran in collaboration with Mate Matisic; Bozidar Violic
- Produced by: Boris Dmitrovic
- Starring: Filip Sovagovic Melita Jurisic
- Cinematography: Goran Trbuljak
- Music by: Nenad Bach Alan Bjelinski
- Distributed by: Blitz
- Release date: 1998
- Running time: 107 minutes
- Country: Croatia
- Language: Croatian

Transatlantic is a 1998 Croatian crime film directed by Mladen Juran- Nomination for the main prize in Latin America, Official Competition 15 Mar del Plata International Film Festival (first film in independent Croatia in the official competition of the world's A Festival), 1999. Official program of the Moscow International Film Festival, (A festival), 1999. Winner 4 Golden Arenas Pula Film Festival, 1998. Kodak Award, 1998. The film was selected as the Croatian entry for the Best Foreign Language Film at the 71st Academy Awards.

PLOT A movie epic about emigration, roots, America, Croatia, organized crime, love, loneliness, fate, the existential measure of everyone’s life, whether thatlife in monumental, ordinary, null or simply human. This taboo-theme in Croatian culture is brilliantly realized in the genre of a social psychological drama with melodramatic, criminal and adventure elements. This “MichaelCiminoesque” film was successfully presented in Los Angeles cinemas as the Croatian Oscar nomination - for best foreign film in 1998." - R. G. Tilly, 2003. Forced by poverty and possible mobilization, Jakov flees to America in 1918., as a war deserter, together with his cousin Luka. The opportunity came when Miho, the owner of the immigration hotel in Pittsburgh sends a letter to Jakov to find him a Croatian wife. A young girl Zorka leaves her home to marry Miho, revolted by the pressure of Jakov's mother, who already married her son with a bit wealthier, but unloved Ivana. In America, Miho understands the situation and instead of marrying Zorka, he is generously sending money home for Jakov's escape. Croats immigrated since the modern migrations ever started. At the beginning of the 20th century they travel mostly as the mariners, as an example four of them were on the first and final voyage of the Titanic. They are leaving in South and North America because of famine and political persecutions. The fate of many immigrants is sublimated in the fate of Jakov and Zorka.

== Cast ==
- Filip Šovagović as Jakov
- Melita Jurisic as Zorka
- Alen Liverić as Jakov's Friend
- Josip Genda as Miha
- Boris Dvornik as Bare
- Ivo Gregurević as Bare's Business Partner
- Matija Prskalo as Ivana
- Relja Bašić as Boxing Promotor
- Slavko Juraga as Franjo
- Davor Juriško as Bartender
- Galiano Pahor as Italian Immigrant

== See also ==
- List of submissions to the 71st Academy Awards for Best Foreign Language Film
- List of Croatian submissions for the Academy Award for Best Foreign Language Film
