= Gavella Drama Theatre =

Theatre in Zagreb, Croatia

- Dramsko kazalište Gavella
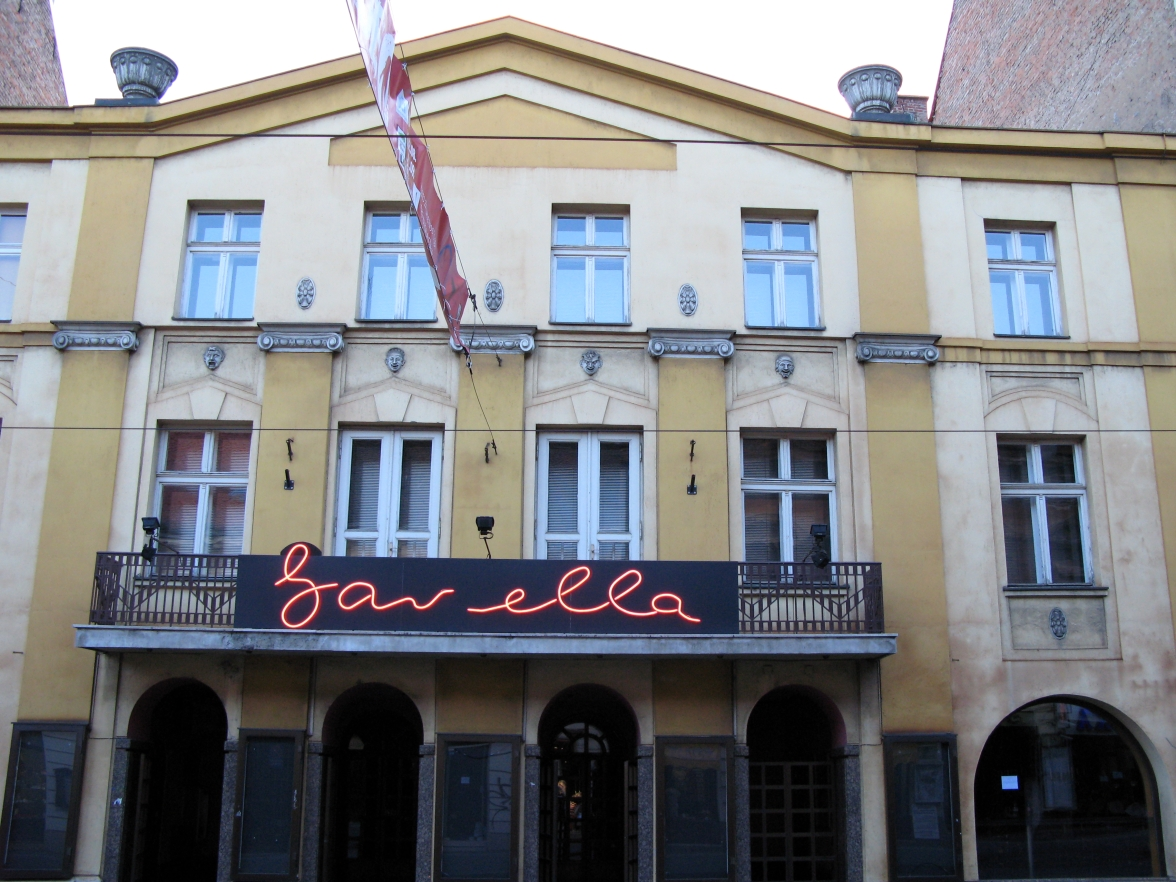
- An image of Gavella Drama Theatre
- Interactive map of Gavella Drama Theatre
- Address: Frankopanska 10
- Location: Zagreb, Croatia
- Coordinates: 45°48′45″N 15°58′11″E

Construction
- Opened: 30 October 1954

Website
- gavella.hr

Gavella Drama Theatre (Croatian: Gradsko dramsko kazalište Gavella) is a Croatian theatre which is situated in Zagreb, in Frankopanska Street.

The theatre opened on October 30, 1954 as the successor of "Helios" cinema which was founded and financed by Croatian industrialist, Adolf Müller.

== Drama ensemble ==
Led by director Dražen Ferenčina, the drama ensemble of the Gavella Theatre includes Živko Anočić, Ivana Bolanča, Amar Bukvić, Nenad Cvetko, Franjo Dijak, Ankica Dobrić, Natalija Đorđević, Anja Đurinović, Zoran Gogić, Ozren Grabarić, Bojana Gregorić, Nataša Janjić, Hrvoje Klobučar, Slavica Knežević, Nela Kocsis, Igor Kovač, Filip Križan, Dražen Kühn, Đorđe Kukuljica, Ana Kvrgić, Mirjana Majurec, Perica Martinović, Sven Medvešek, Jelena Miholjević, Darko Milas, Barbara Nola, Ksenija Pajić, Janko Rakoš, Ivana Roščić, Siniša Ružić, Antonija Stanišić, Sven Šestak, Anja Šovagović-Despot, Filip Šovagović, Enes Vejzović, Dijana Vidušin and Ranko Zidarić.
