= Igor Kovač (actor) =

Croatian actor

- Born: 23 October 1983 (age 42); Vukovar, SR Croatia, SFR Yugoslavia (now Croatia)
- Occupation: Actor

Igor Kovač (born 23 October 1983) is a Croatian actor. Kovač has acted in films, for the television and the theater. He is known for his performances in Debela and Rock'n'roll za DVA MIŠA at Zagreb's Mala Scena Theater, and for his prolific stints in the Gavella Drama Theatre and the Croatian National Theatre in Zagreb.

His notable film roles include Gdje pingvini lete (2008), Kotlovina (2011) and Kosac (2014). For the latter, he was awarded a Golden Arena for Best Supporting Actor. He is also known for his starring role in the comedy series Nedjeljom ujutro, subotom navečer (2012) and as Tin Ujević in the 2017 biographical series. He also worked as a voice actor, notably dubbing the Croatian versions of the title character in Ferdinand (2017) and Aaron Davis / Prowler in Spider-Man: Into the Spider-Verse (2018).

== Biography ==
Kovač was born in Vukovar, SR Croatia, SFR Yugoslavia (now Croatia) on 23 October 1983. He finished primary and elementary school in Osijek, and later studied acting at the Academy of Dramatic Arts, University of Zagreb.

He worked at the Croatian National Theatre in Rijeka from 2011 to 2015. In 2015, he transferred to the Gavella Drama Theatre in Zagreb, appearing in over twenty shows, including Mack / Delamarche in Amerika, Ivica Kičmanović in U registraturi (2015) and Ante in How the War Started on my Island (2018).

In 2020, he came to the Croatian National Theatre in Zagreb as a champion of drama. His current roles in Zagreb include Revizor, Gdje se kupuju nježnosti and Kafka on the Shore.

Beside his work on stage, Kovač has appeared in several movies and television series. He is also a voice actor. He has dubbed the lead characters of such movies as Ferdinand (2017). He also dubbed Aaron Davis / Prowler in Spider-Man: Into the Spider-Verse (2018).

== Filmography ==
=== Television roles ===
- "U dobru i zlu" as Slaven (2024)
- "Minus i plus" as Kruno (2019)
- "Pogrešan čovjek" as David (2018)
- "Patrola na cesti" as inspector (2016)
- "Nedjeljom ujutro, subotom navečer" as Hans (2012)
- "Instruktor" as Žarko (2010)
- "Mamutica" as Jurica (2008–2010)
- "Operacija Kajman" as policeman (2007)
- "Naša mala klinika" as patient (2007)
- "Cimmer fraj" as Boško (2007)

=== Film roles ===
- "Bosnian pot" (2023)
- "Kotlovina" as Jakov (2011)
- "Ćaća" as boy (2011)
- "Gdje pingvini lete" as Emil / narrator (2008)

=== Voice roles ===
- "Spider-Man: Into the Spider-Verse" as Aaron Davis / Prowler (2018)
- "Ferdinand" as Ferdinand (2017)
- "School for Vampires" as Oskar von Horrificus (seasons 1 and 2, the other seasons the character was voiced by Mitja Smiljanić)
