= Illusion (1967 film) =

- Directed by: Krsto Papić
- Written by: Zvonimir Majdak; Krsto Papić; Ante Peterlić; Branko Ivanda (story)
- Starring: Vanja Drach; Marija Lojk; Slobodan Dimitrijević; Branko Kovačić
- Cinematography: Krešo Grčević
- Edited by: Blazenka Jencik
- Music by: Miljenko Prohaska
- Release date: 12 July 1967
- Running time: 93 minutes
- Country: Yugoslavia
- Language: Serbo-Croatian

Illusion (Croatian: Iluzija) is a 1967 Croatian film directed by Krsto Papić.
