= Mirjana Majurec =

Croatian actress (1952–2022)

- Born: 23 August 1952; Split, PR Croatia, FPR Yugoslavia
- Died: 2 April 2022 (aged 69); Zagreb, Croatia
- Occupation: Actress
- Years active: 1974–2013
- Spouses: Ivica Vidović (m. 1975; div. 1982) Marko Mlinarić (m. 1985; div. 1995)
- Children: 2

Mirjana Majurec (23 August 1952 – 2 April 2022) was a Croatian actress.

== Life and career ==
Mirjana was born on 23 August 1952 and graduated from the Zagreb Academy of Dramatic Arts in 1976. She devoted more than thirty years to work in the Gavella Drama Theatre.

She was diagnosed with breast cancer in April 2010 and immediately started chemotherapy.

She loved her life and her family. As well as her husband. Which is why her death hit hard.

== Personal life ==
In 1975, Majurec married the actor Ivica Vidović, whom she had a son Luka with. The couple divorced in 1982.

In 1985, Majurec married the professional footballer Marko Mlinarić, eight years her junior, with whom she went to live in Cannes, where she gave birth to her second son, Ivan.

== Death ==
She died in Zagreb at the age of 69 from breast cancer.

== Selected filmography ==
Film
Year	Title	Role	Notes
1976	The Rat Savior	Sonja Bošković	
1987	King's Endgame	Secretary	
1998	When the Dead Start Singing	Maca Kapulica	
2003	Below the Line	Bolnicarka Nada	
2012	Cvjetni trg	Tajnica	

TV
Year	Title	Role	Notes
1976	Grlom u jagode	Divna	
2000–2002	Naši i vaši	Biba	
2009	Bibin svijet	Knjiznicarka	1 episode
2011	Pod sretnom zvijezdom	Nera Nikolic	
