= The Recollection Thief =

2007 Croatian film

The Recollection Thief (Kradljivac uspomena) is a 2007 Croatian film directed by Vicko Ruić, starring Nikša Kušelj and Sven Medvešek. It is based on Dino Milinović's novel of the same name.
