= Jelka (given name) =

Jelka is a feminine given name that may refer to the following notable people:

- Jelka Glumičić (born 1941), Croatian human rights activist
- Jelka Godec Schmidt (born 1958), Slovene illustrator and writer of children's books
- Jelka Reichman (born 1939), Slovene painter and illustrator
- Jelka Rosen (1868–1935), German painter
- Jelka van Houten (born 1978), Dutch actress
