= Dijana Vidušin =

Croatian actress

- Born: 12 February 1982 (age 43); Pula, SR Croatia, SFR Yugoslavia
- Occupation: Actress
- Years active: 2002–present
- Spouse: Mario Knezović
- Children: 2
- Awards: Golden Arena for Best Actress (2009)

Dijana Vidušin (born 12 February 1982) is a Croatian film, theatre and television actress. She won a Golden Arena for Best Actress at the Pula Film Festival.

== Filmography ==
=== Television roles ===
- Sram (2024) as Eva's mother
- Oblak u službi zakona (2023) as Jagoda Oblak
- Luda kuća as Plamenka (2009)
- Moja 3 zida as Dijana (2009)
- Hitna 94 as Ela Radanjić (2008)
- Zauvijek susjedi as Jana (2007)
- Naša mala klinika as Vera (2005)

=== Movie roles ===
- Zagonetni dječak as Neda (2013)
- Fuga y Misterio as Dora (2013)
- Od danas do sutra as Jana (2012)
- U jednoj zimskoj noći as Jasna (2012)
- Koko and the Ghosts as Neda (2011)
- Ljubavni život domobrana as Ines (2009)
- U tišini as Ivana (2006)
- Kao u lošem snu as Hannah (2002)
