= Vukovar: The Way Home =

- Directed by: Branko Schmidt
- Written by: Branko Schmidt
- Music by: Igor Savin; Croatian Radiotelevision symphonic orchestra
- Release date: 5 May 1994
- Running time: 105 minutes
- Country: Croatia
- Language: Croatian

Vukovar: The Way Home (Croatian: Vukovar se vraća kući, lit. 'Vukovar is Coming Home') is a Croatian drama film directed by Branko Schmidt. It was released in 1994. The film was selected as the Croatian entry for the Best Foreign Language Film at the 67th Academy Awards, but was not accepted as a nominee.

Vukovar: The Way Home is a drama that depicts the difficult life of Vukovar exiles during the 1991 war, who found refuge in wagons at a side railway station. The main characters of the film are a three-member family consisting of father Vinko, mother Jelka and son Darko, who hope to return home but eventually lose hope of returning.

== See also ==
- List of submissions to the 67th Academy Awards for Best Foreign Language Film
- List of Croatian submissions for the Academy Award for Best Foreign Language Film
