= Zlatko Vitez =

Croatian actor (born 1950)

Minister of Culture
- In office 18 October 1994 – 7 November 1995
- Prime Minister: Nikica Valentić
- Preceded by: Vesna Girardi-Jurkić
- Succeeded by: Božo Biškupić

Personal details
- Born: 22 June 1950 (age 76) Varaždin, PR Croatia, FPR Yugoslavia (modern Croatia)
- Party: Croatian Democratic Union
- Education: University of Zagreb (Academy of Dramatic Art)
- Awards: Order of Danica Hrvatska

Zlatko Vitez (born 22 June 1950) is a Croatian theatre and film actor. He also served as the Croatian Minister of Culture in the period between October 1994 and November 1995 in the Cabinet of Nikica Valentić.

Vitez was born in Varaždin and graduated from the Zagreb Academy of Dramatic Art in 1972. He went on to appear in about a hundred theatre productions at several prominent theatres, including the Gavella Drama Theatre and the Croatian National Theatre in Zagreb.

Between the mid-1970s and late 1990s he also appeared in a number of Croatian television and feature films, most notably the leading role in Zvonimir Berković's 1985 film Love Letters with Intent (Ljubavna pisma s predumišljajem).
