= Mirela Brekalo =

Croatian actress

- Born: 6 February 1956 (age 70); Zagreb, PR Croatia, FPR Yugoslavia
- Occupation: Actress
- Years active: 1978-present

Mirela Brekalo (born 6 February 1956) is a Croatian actress. She appeared in more than forty films since 1978.

== Selected filmography ==
Film
Year	Title	Role	Notes
2009	The Lika Cinema		
2011	Kotlovina	Ana	
2024	My Late Summer	Widow Stipetić	

TV
Year	Title	Role	Notes
2011–2013	Ruža vjetrova	Marica Odak	
