= Goran Tribuson =

Croatian prose and screenplay writer (born 1948)

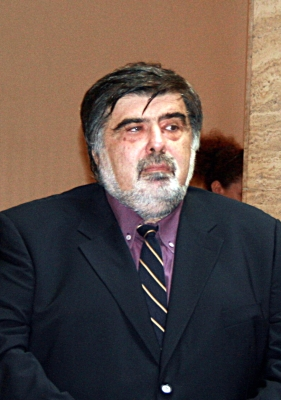
Goran Tribuson

Goran Tribuson (Croatian pronunciation: [ɡǒran trîbuson]; born August 6, 1948, in Bjelovar) is a Croatian prose and screenplay writer.

Tribuson received his B.A. in literature from the Philosophical Faculty in Zagreb and his M.A. in filmology at the University of Zagreb. He worked for the Vjesnik Marketing Agency, and was a coeditor and revisor of the Croatian Lexicon. He teaches screen-writing at the Zagreb Academy of Dramatic Arts.

Along with Pavao Pavličić, Tribuson is the most productive and the most popular Croatian writer from the mid-1970s to the present day. From the point of view of style, genre and subject matter Tribuson's work can be divided in several phases which all have in common the author's concern for the reader for whom he is writing, a compact plot, a great writing skill and the avoidance of any ideology. Tribuson is equally skilled in the application of postmodernist techniques: persiflage, quotes, intertextuality, autoreference, metatextuality etc. His writing is influenced by rock and pop-culture, film and sometimes even jazz. His literary models are Raymond Chandler, Graham Greene and Karel Čapek.

He lives in Zagreb.

== Work ==
Tribuson began writing and publishing short-stories in various magazines while he was still at college. As a subversive reaction to the superimposed social realism in Croatian literature a generation of fantastical writers emerged in the early 1970s, and Tribuson was part of it. He is still considered to be one of the most prominent representatives of this movement. His early fantastical stories were published in three collections, Zavjera kartografa (The Cartographists Conspiracy, 1972), Praška smrt (Death in Prague, 1975) i Raj za pse (Dog Heaven, 1978). Mysticism, the occult and horror are some of the themes of these stories. Thematically, the novel Snijeg u Heidelbergu (Snow in Heidelberg, 1980) belongs to the same fantastical cycle, although it also marks the beginning of a new phase. Critics consider it one of the best works of the fantastical writers' generation. It is a kind of mixture of the sotonic and the picaresque. Tribuson returns to the fantastical and the grotesque in several other works: in his novel Potonulo groblje (Sunken Cemetery, 1990), which is considered to be a contemporary version of the gothic novel and which got him the "K. Š. Gjalski" literary award; in the novel entitled Sanatorij (Sanatorium, 1993), as well as in the collection of short-stories entitled Zvijezda kabarea (Star of the Cabaret, 1999), in which he emerges as a fully mature writer of the so-called fantastical prose.

The 1980s mark the beginning of Tribuson's so-called Aschenreiterov cycle which, in addition to the already mentioned ones, includes the novels Čuješ li nas Frido Štern (Do You Hear Us, Frida Štern, 1981) and Ruski rulet (Russian Roulette, 1982) subtitled "a boulevard novel", and erases the boundaries between the so-called "highbrow" and "lowbrow" literature.

The third cycle comprises Tribuson’s autobiographical writings, the best known among them being a trilogy of "generation" novels: Polagana predaja (Slow Surrender, 1984), Legija stranaca (Foreign Legion, 1985) and several editions of the bestselling Povijest pornografije (History of Pornography, 1988), which deals with the theme of growing up in a small town, the emergence and disappearance of youthful illusions and ideals, the confrontation of socialism with the unstoppable breakthrough of rock, pop culture, film and media. This cycle of varying quality includes, among other things, autobiographical prose works such as Rani dani (Early Days, 1997), Trava i korov (Grass and Weed, 1999) and Mrtva priroda (Still Nature, 2003). These are witty, ironic, clever and often fragmentary writings about the author's family history which is intertwined with history in general. Thematically the cycle includes the humorous novel Ne dao Bog većeg zla (God Save Us From Greater Evil, 2002), written after the production of the film with the same title, for which Tribuson wrote the screenplay.

His fourth cycle consists of "pure" crime novels in the manner of the American hard boiled school: in his interviews, Tribuson repeatedly asserted that "a crime novel can either be a stylistic exercise or a social novel; if it is just an exercise, I am not interested in it". Thus, in the six novels published so far (Zavirivanje/Peaking 1985; Siva zona /The Grey Zone 1989; Dublja strana zaljeva /The Deeper End of the Bay 1991; Noćna smjena /Night Shift 1996; Bijesne lisice /Rabid Foxes 2000; Gorka čokolada /Bitter Chocolate 2004), structured as detective stories featuring P.I. Nikola Banić he has given a historical panorama of the Croatian society, from the beginning of the fall of socialism to the ups and downs of the transitional period. Tribuson has not only given literary legitimacy to the crime genre in Croatian literature, he also bases novels of this genre on the everyday reality of the local community. Although his private investigator Nikola Banić, a Croatian version of Philip Marlowe, is a slightly unconventional detective type because he is a jazz fan, a beer drinker, a dedicated smoker and a man burdened with many family problems, he has become very popular among the readers.

Tribuson is the most popular Croatian writer of his generation. Critics sometimes consider him to be a populist writer, a writer who is too eager to please his audience with his genre novels. They therefore consider his fantastical novels to be his best. It is true, however, that Tribuson has produced works of anthological value in each of his cycles.

== Books ==
- Zavjera kartografa, (The Cartographists Conspiracy, stories), Zagreb: Znanje, 1972
- Praška smrt, groteske, (Death in Prague, grotesques), Zagreb: Centar za kulturnu djelatnost Saveza socijalističke omladine, 1975
- Raj za pse, (Dog Heaven, stories), Čakovec: "Zrinski", 1978
- Snijeg u Heidelbergu, (Snow in Heidelberg, novel), Zagreb: "August Cesarec", 1980
- Čuješ li nas Frido Štern, (Do You Hear Us, Frida Štern, novel), Zagreb: "August Cesarec", 1981
- Ruski rulet : bulevarski roman, 2 sv., (Russian Roulette: a boulevard novel) Beograd: Prosveta, 1982
- Spavaća kola, izabrane priče, (Sleeping Compartment, selected stories), Osijek: Revija, 1983
- Polagana predaja, (Slow Surrender, novel), Zagreb: Znanje, 1984
- Legija stranaca, (Foreign Legion, novel), Zagreb: Znanje, 1985
- Zavirivanje: [prvi slučaj policijskog inspektora Banića], (Peaking: police inspector Banić's first case), Beograd: Prosveta, 1985
- Uzvratni susret, (Counter game, novel) Opatija: "Otokar Keršovani", 1986
- Made in U. S. A., roman, (Made in USA, novel), Zagreb: Znanje, 1986
- Klasici na ekranu, zbirka priča, (Classics on the Screen, stories), Zrenjanin, 1987
- Povijest pornografije, roman, (History of Pornography, novel), Zagreb : Znanje, 1988
- Siva zona : [drugi slučaj policijskog inspektora Nikole Banića], (The Grey Zone: police inspector Banić's second case, novel) Zagreb: Školska knjiga, 2001
- Potonulo groblje, (Sunken Cemetery, novel), Zagreb: Znanje, 1990
- Dublja strana zaljeva : [treći slučaj istražitelja Nikole Banića], (The Deeper End of the Bay: detective Nikola Banić's third case, novel), Zagreb: Školska knjiga, 2001
- Sanatorij, (Sanatorium, novel) Zagreb: Znanje, 1993
- Noćna smjena : [četvrti slučaj istražitelja Nikole Banića], (Night Shift: detective Nikola Banić's fourth case, novel), Zagreb: Targa, 1996
- Rani dani : kako smo odrastali uz filmove i televiziju, (Early Days: How We Grew Up With Films and Television, autobiographical writings), Zagreb: Znanje, 1997
- Zvijezda kabarea : [nove priče], (Star of the Cabaret, new stories), Zagreb: Znanje, 1998
- Osmi okular : izabrane priče; izbor i pogovor Igor Štiks, (The Eight Ocular, selected short stories), Zagreb: Ceres, 1998
- Trava i korov : novi zapisi o odrastanju, (Grass and Weed: New Writings on Growing Up, autobiographical writings), Zagreb: Mozaik knjiga, 1999
- Bijesne lisice : [peti slučaj istražitelja Nikole Banića], (Rabid Foxes: detective Nikola Banić's fifth case, novel), Zagreb: Školska knjiga, 2000
- Klub obožavatelja : periferijski kvartet, (The Fan Club: A Suburban Quartet, stories), Zagreb: Znanje, 2001
- Ne dao Bog većeg zla, (God Save Us From Greater Evil, novel), Zagreb: Mozaik knjiga, 2002
- Mrtva priroda : ogledi iz estetike, (Still Nature: Esthetical Essays, autobiographical writings), Zagreb: Mozaik knjiga, 2003
- Gorka čokolada : [šesti slučaj istražitelja Nikole Banića], (Bitter Chocolate: detective Nikola Banić's sixth case, novel), Zagreb: Školska knjiga, 2004
- Divlja plaža, (Wild Beach) 2009
- Susjed u nevolji (Neighbour in troubles) 2014

== Screenplays ==
- Crvena prašina, (Red Dust) 1999, director Zrinko Ogresta
- Srce nije u modi, (The Heart is Not Fashionable) 2000, director Branko Schmidt
- Polagana predaja, (Slow Surrender) 2001, director Bruno Gamulin
- Potonulo groblje, (The Sunken Cemetery) 2002, director Mladen Juran
- Ne dao bog većeg zla, (God Save Us From Greater Evil) 2002, director Snježana Tribuson

== Collections ==
- Hrvatska kratka priča : antologija priča "Večernjeg lista" 1964.-1994.; izbor, predgovor i bilješke Tomislav Sabljak, (Croatian Short Story: an anthology), Zagreb: Alfa : Večernji list, 1994
- Antologija hrvatske novele, ed. Krešimir Nemec, (Anthology of Croatian novellas), Zagreb: Naklada Pavičić, 1997
- Antologija hrvatskog humora : zlatna knjiga humorističke i satiričke književnosti kroz šest stoljeća, odabrao i priredio Fadil Hadžić, (Anthology of Croatian Humor: the Golden Book of Humoristic and Satirical Literature Through Six Centuries), Zagreb: VBZ, 1999
- Antologija hrvatske književnosti, (Anthology of Croatian Literature), ed. Matilda Bolcs, Budapest: Nemzeti Tankonyvkiado, 1999
- Prodavaonica tajni : izbor iz hrvatske fantastične proze, (Shop of Secrets: a selection of Croatian fantastic prose), ed. Jagna Pogačnik, Zagreb: Znanje, 2001
- V objetí řeky: antologie chorvatské povídky 20. století / sestavil, úvod a slovník zastoupených autorů napsal Ivan Dobrovský; doslov napsal Miroslav Šicel; přeložili Vlasta Burmazová... [et al.] 1. vyd, Brno; Boskovice : František Šale – ALBERT, 2002
- Pisci o pisanju, (Writers on Writing), ed. Milana Vuković Runjić, Zagreb: Vuković & Runjić, 2003

== Bibliography, selected ==
- Velimir Visković u Pozicija kritičara: "kritičarske opaske o suvremenoj hrvatskoj prozi", Zagreb: Znanje, 1988 (The Position of the Critic: Critical Comments on Contemporary Croatian Literature)
- Miroslava Vučić: "Čitanje scenarija "Doviđenja u Nuštru" Gorana Tribusona, Književna revija, Osijek – 32 (1992), 3-4-5-6; str. 301–359 (Reading of the Screenplay)
- Gordana Crnković, "Posveta modernizmu : Goran Tribuson: Sanatorij", Riječi – (1993), 11/12; str. 163–168 (Dedication to Modernism: Goran Tribuson, Sanatorium)
- Đurđa Strsoglavec, "Goran Tribuson Oduzmete li mi pravo na mijenu, učinili ste od mene mrtvog pisca : intervju s G. Tribusonom" (Goran Tribuson: If You Take Away My Right to Change, You've Made Me a Dead Writer: interview with G. Tribuson)
- Jasminka Kokolić, Ivana Bašić. Noćna smjena (Night Shift) / Helena Sablić-Tomić – Bibliografske bilješke uz tekst (Bibliographical notes on the Text), Književna revija, Osijek – 36 (1996), 1/2; str. 67–117
- Ivan Pinter, Strukturni izvori i uviri proze Gorana Tribusona (Structural Sources and Influences in Goran Tribuson's Prose) / Bibliografske bilješke uz tekst; Summary, Bjelovarski učitelj, Bjelovar- 5 (1996), 1/2; str. 3–18
- Jagna Pogačnik, Borgesovski model fantastike i kratka proza Gorana Tribusona (The Borgesian Model of the Fantastic and Short Prose) / Bibliografske bilješke uz tekst, Književna revija, Osijek – 40 (2000), 1/2; str. 181–192
- Velid Đekić, Made in USA, proizvedeno u Hrvatskoj : Goran Tribuson (Made in USA made in Croatia: Goran Tribuson), Književna Rijeka, Rijeka – [6] (2001), 1; str. 84–85
- Antun Pavešković, Fusnote ljubavi i zlobe (6) : Goran Tribuson: Mrtva priroda (Ogledi iz estetike), (Footnotes of Love and Malice (6): Goran Tribuson, Still Nature, Esthetical Essays), Republika, Zagreb – 60 (2004), 10; str. 123–126.
