= Dijana Bolanča =

Croatian actress

- Born: 30 October 1974 (age 51); Šibenik, SR Croatia, SFR Yugoslavia
- Other name: Dijana Bolanča
- Occupation: Actress
- Years active: 1996–2007

Dijana Bolanča (born 30 October 1974 in Šibenik) is a Croatian theatre, film and television actress.

== Filmography ==
=== Television roles ===
- "Odmori se, zaslužio si" as Biba Kosmički #1 (2006-2007)
- "Kad zvoni?" as prodavačica (2005)
- "Naši i vaši" as Iva Rašelić (2000-2002)

=== Movie roles ===
- "Ne pitaj kako!" kao policajka (2006)
- "Generalov carski osmijeh" (2002)
- "Reci Saša, što je?" (2002)
- "Crna kronika ili dan žena" (2000)
- "Četverored" as Volođina tajnica (1999)
- "Puna kuća" (1998)
- "Dobrodošli u Sarajevo" as Ninina suradnica (1997)
- "Rusko meso" as Mimi (1997)
- "Letač Joe i Marija smjela" as djevojka (1996)
