= Alen Liverić =

Croatian film and television actor

- Born: 1 January 1967 (age 58); Rijeka, SR Croatia, SFR Yugoslavia
- Occupation: Actor
- Years active: 1988–present

Alen Liverić (born 1 January 1967) is a Croatian actor.

== Filmography ==
=== Television Game ===
- Zid as HRT1

=== Television roles ===
- "Novine" as Toni Nardelli (2016-2018)
- "Vatre ivanjske" as Patrik Vidan (2014-2015)
- "Zora dubrovačka" as Djivo Knego (2013-2014)
- "Stella" as Franjo's friend (2013)
- "Larin izbor" as Zoran Armanini (2011-2012)
- "Usta usta" as dr. Pietrich (2011)
- "Hitna 94" as dr. Tomislav Matić (2008)
- "Dobre namjere" as Sven (2007-2008)
- "Luda kuća" as Joško Kakariga (2005-2008)
- "Bumerang" as Boško Krivić (2005)
- "Zagrljaj" as Lojz (1988)

=== Movie roles ===
- "Broj 55" (2014)
- "Hitac" as Matija (2013)
- "Zagonetni dječak" as Mlinaric (2013)
- "Mezanin" as boss (2011)
- "Josef" as Tiffenbach (2011)
- "Fleke" as Doctor Mario (2011)
- "Ničiji sin" as Ivan (2008)
- "Duga mračna noć" as Jozef Schmit (2004)
- "Sjećanje na Georgiju" as Ivan Starčević (2002)
- "Četverored" as Blaž Blažinić (1999)
- "Transatlantik" as Luka (1998)
- "Muka" as Djaval (1994)
- "Vježbanje života" (1991)
- "Karneval, andjeo i prah" (1990)
