= Winter in Rio =

2002 film

- Directed by: Davor Žmegač
- Produced by: HRT
- Starring: Mustafa Nadarević; Leona Paraminski; Sven Medvešek
- Distributed by: HRT
- Release date: 2002
- Running time: 90 minutes
- Country: Croatia
- Language: Croatian

Winter in Rio (Prezimiti u Riju) is a Croatian film directed by Davor Žmegač. It was released in 2002.

== Cast ==
- Mustafa Nadarević as Grga
- Leona Paraminski as Monika
- Sven Medvešek as Rafael
- Ranko Zidarić
- Zarko Savić as Panco
- Enes Vejzović as Mali
- Sasa Anočić as Boris
- Vera Zima as Danica
- Matej Busić as Konobar
- Marijan Crtalić as Luka
- Igor Damjanović as Kradljivac
- Marija Kohn as Bakica
- Zlatko Kopljar as Mislav
- Vladimir Krstulović as Stari Kloser
- Tanja Kursar as Konobarica
