= Josip Kozarac =

Croatian writer

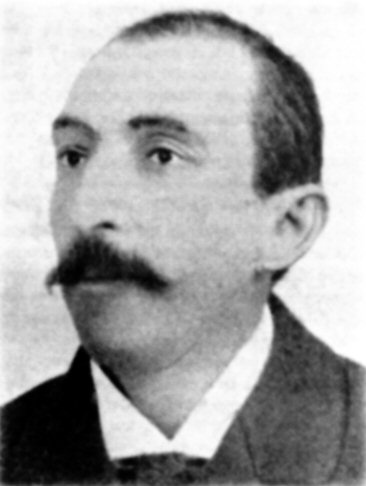
Josip Kozarac

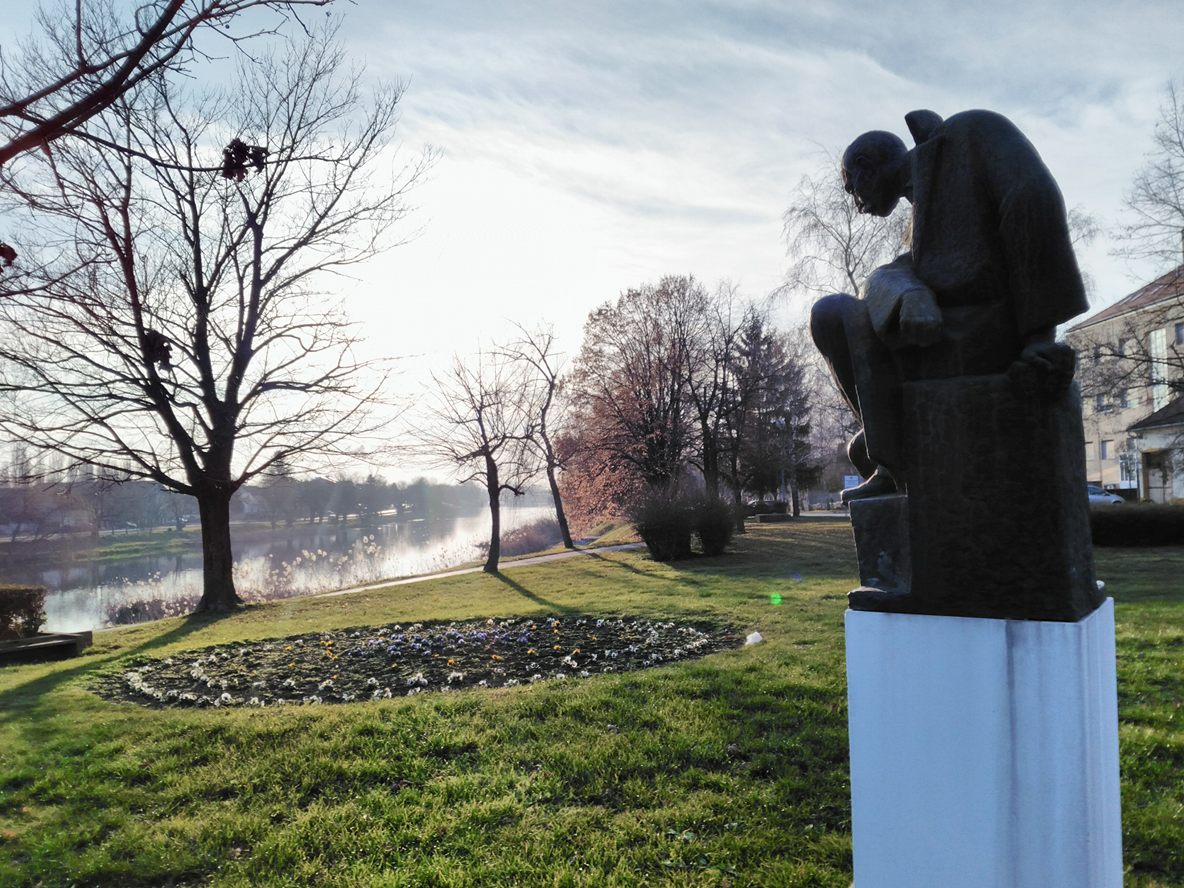
Statue of Josip Kozarac in Vinkovci

Josip Kozarac (18 March 1858 – 21 August 1906) was a Croatian writer.

Josip Kozarac was born in Vinkovci, Austrian Empire. He studied forestry management in Vienna and later served as forestry official in Vinkovci.

He wrote stories, plays and novels. In them he showed great ability to portray Slavonian peasants and expressed his displeasure over the decay of Slavonian economy and foreigners taking over Croatian national wealth. His most well-known work is his novel, Mrtvi kapitali (1890).

== Works ==
- Biser-Kata
- Male pripovijesti
- Među svjetlom i tminom
- Mira Kodolićeva
- Mrtvi kapitali
- Oprava
- Priče djeda Nike
- Slavonska šuma
- Tena

== See also ==
- Ivan Kozarac

== Sources ==
- Kozarac, Josip at lzmk.hr (in Croatian)
