= Sokol Did Not Love Him =

1988 Croatian film

- Directed by: Branko Schmidt
- Written by: Branko Schmidt; Fabijan Sovagovic
- Produced by: Bogdan Zizic
- Starring: Fabijan Sovagovic; Filip Sovagovic; Krunoslav Saric
- Cinematography: Goran Trbuljak
- Edited by: Vesna Lazeta
- Production company: Zagreb Film
- Release date: 31 March 1988
- Running time: 1h 26m
- Country: Yugoslavia
- Language: Serbo-Croatian

Sokol Did Not Love Him (Sokol ga nije volio) is a Croatian film directed by Branko Schmidt. It was released in 1988.
