= Medeni mjesec =

Medeni mjesec is a 1983 Croatian film directed by Nikola Babić. It is based on a novel by Zvonimir Majdak.
