= Putovanje tamnom polutkom =

1995 Croatian film

Putovanje tamnom polutkom is a Croatian film directed by Davor Žmegač. It was released in 1995.
