= Kotlovina (film) =

2011 film

- Directed by: Tomislav Radić
- Written by: Tomislav Radić
- Produced by: Tomislav Radić
- Starring: Mirela Brekalo; Igor Kovač; Suzana Nikolić
- Cinematography: Vedran Šamanović
- Edited by: Maja Filjak Bilandžija
- Release dates: 20 July 2011 (Pula Film Festival); 15 September 2011 (Croatia)
- Running time: 120 minutes
- Country: Croatia
- Language: Croatian

Kotlovina is a 2011 Croatian drama film written and directed by Tomislav Radić.

== Cast ==
- Mirela Brekalo as Ana
- Igor Kovač as Jakov
- Suzana Nikolić as Seka
- Draško Zidar as Mirko
- Boris Buzančić as Dida
- Bruna Bebić as Lucija
- Goran Navojec as Damir
- Filip Križan as Krešo
- Melita Jurišić as Mimi
