= Officer with a Rose =

- Oficir s ružom
- Directed by: Dejan Šorak
- Written by: Dejan Šorak
- Starring: Ksenija Pajić, Žarko Laušević, Vida Jerman
- Release date: 1987
- Country: Yugoslavia
- Language: Serbo-Croatian

Officer with a Rose (Oficir s ružom) is a Yugoslav film directed by Dejan Šorak. It was released in 1987.

== Plot ==
The Second World War has ended and Zagreb has been liberated from Nazis occupation. Petar is a Croatian lieutenant with orders to pursue German collaborators.

== Cast ==
- Ksenija Pajic as Matilda
- Zarko Lausevic as Petar
- Vida Jerman as ljerka
