= Ivan Kozarac =

Croatian writer (1885–1910)

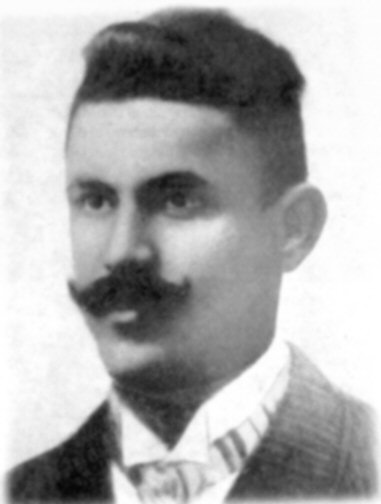
Ivan Kozarac

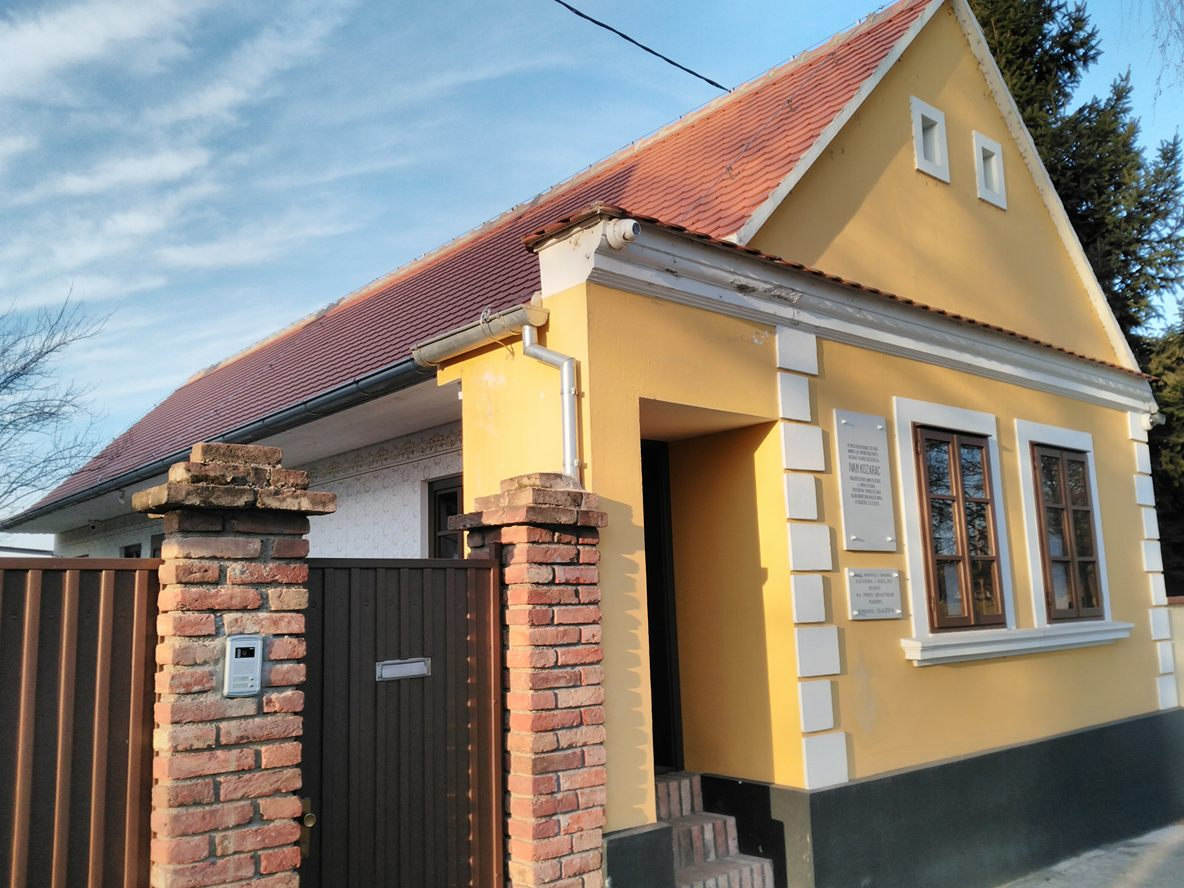
Ivan Kozarac birth house in Vinkovci.

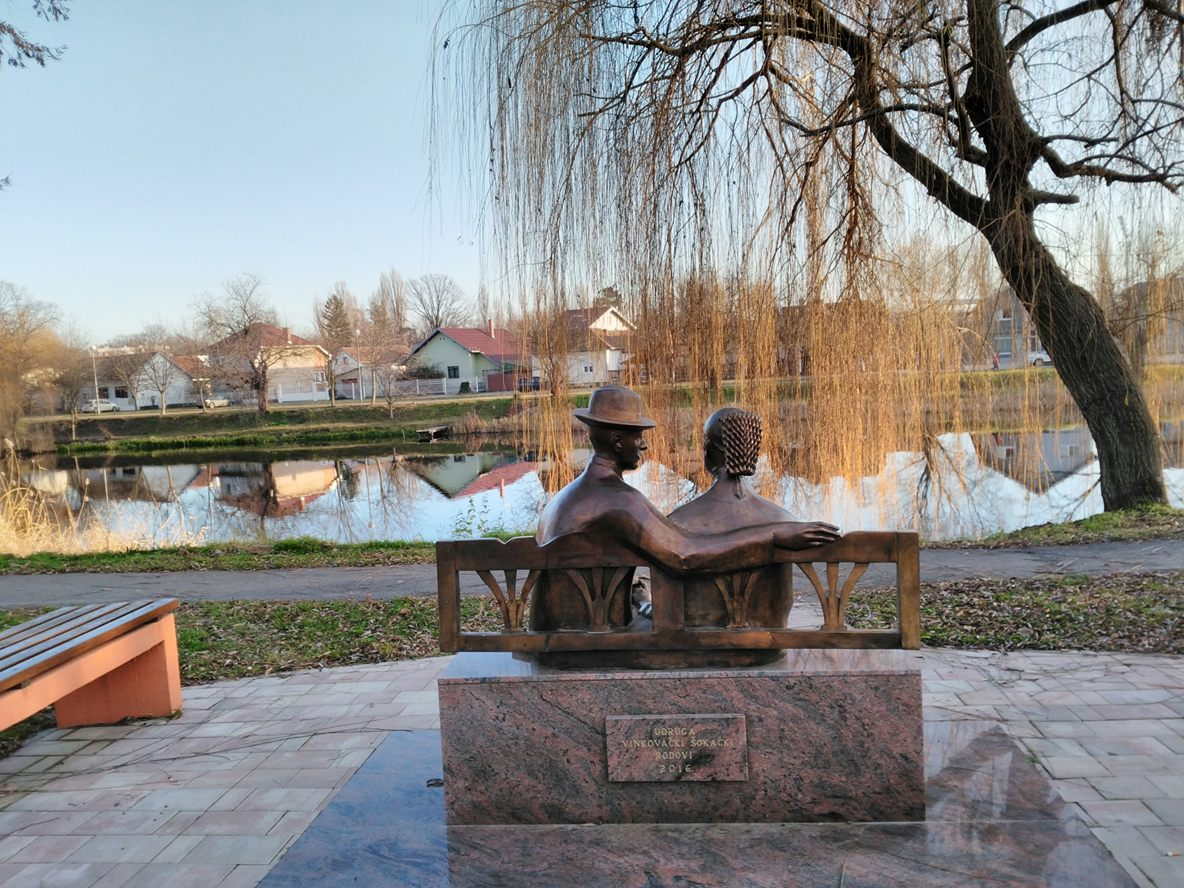
Ivan&Marija monument in Vinkovci.

Ivan Kozarac (February 8, 1885 – November 16, 1910) was a Croatian novelist, poet and writer of short stories.

== Biography ==
Ivan Kozarac was born in Vinkovci, Croatia (then Kingdom of Croatia-Slavonia, Austria-Hungary). He came from a peasant family that sent him to school, but he managed to finish only two classes. As a thirteen-year-old boy wanting to avoid the family poverty, he was employed as a clerical trainee in a district in Vinkovci.

From 1900 until 1906, he worked as a law clerk in the office of Levin aristocracy. In 1903, Ivan suffered from tuberculosis, but he is not relieved from his military duty. In 1907, he went to the army (first in Petrovaradin, then in Karlovac).

In 1909, he returned to his hometown, but in the fall of the year he went to Zagreb where he was employed as a fund manager and director of the Croatian Writers Society. In the summer of 1910, the writer and doctor Milivoj Dežman referred him to treatment in Brestovac. However, Ivan returned home uncured and eventually died in Vinkovci at the age of 25.

== Works ==
Ivan Kozarac was an active writer for only four years. In his lifetime only a single book was published; a compilation of short stories, Slavonian Blood in 1906, and his other books were released only after his death (thanks in part to the efforts of Dragutin Tadijanović).

His cardinal work is the novel Đuka Begović, first published in 1911. The novel describes many Slavonian traditions in an almost documentary style. It has since been made into a theatrical play and a film by Branko Schmidt.

Kozarac failed to attract a particular attention to himself in his lifetime. He was a narrator of the life of typical villages of Šokadija during a time when the Military Frontier was freshly reintegrated into Slavonia. He wrote much about the corruption of women and fashion and took a critical stance towards the Church, the wealthy life of some priests, and the false love towards God. His love for his native Slavonia emerges from each of his works.

== Legacy ==
Today a local prize for literary achievement is named after him Josip Kozarac (his uncle and also a writer).
