= Slow Surrender =

2001 film by Bruno Gamulin

- Croatian: Polagana predaja
- Directed by: Bruno Gamulin
- Based on: Polagana predaja by Goran Tribuson
- Starring: Filip Šovagović; Sven Medvešek; Lucija Šerbedžija; Anja Šovagović-Despot
- Music by: Davor Rocco
- Production companies: HRT; Gama Studio
- Distributed by: HRT
- Release date: 2001
- Running time: 92 minutes
- Country: Croatia
- Language: Croatian

Slow Surrender (Croatian: Polagana predaja) is a 2001 Croatian film directed by Bruno Gamulin, starring Filip Šovagović, Sven Medvešek and Lucija Šerbedžija. It is based on a 1984 novel of the same name by Goran Tribuson.

== Plot ==
Petar Gorjan (Filip Šovagović) is a cynical 40-year-old PR man who is profoundly unhappy with his life: he betrayed the ideals of his youth, and has a failed marriage behind him. While driving his car to Dubrovnik to visit his ex-wife (Anja Šovagović-Despot) and child, he meets Lukas (Sven Medvešek), a rather eccentric young man, and Mala (Lucija Šerbedžija), a vagrant girl. They join him against his will and proceed to introduce additional chaos into his life.
