= Miljenko Prohaska =

Croatian composer and conductor

- Born: 17 September 1925 Zagreb, Kingdom of Serbs, Croats and Slovenes
- Died: 29 May 2014 (aged 88) Zagreb, Croatia
- Occupation(s): Composer, music arranger, orchestra conductor
- Years active: 1950s–2014

Miljenko Prohaska (17 September 1925 – 29 May 2014) was a Croatian composer, music arranger and orchestra conductor.

A respected double-bass player, He was mainly known for founding a number of prominent Croatian orchestras and for his longtime service as the conductor of the Radio Zagreb Dance Orchestra (the present-day Croatian Radiotelevision Big Band Orchestra).

== Biography ==
Prohaska was born in Zagreb and he first began learning the violin at a children's music school in Zagreb. He went on to enroll at a secondary music school where he was educated as a contrabass player and graduated in 1951, before continuing his studies at the Zagreb Music Academy and graduating in 1956 from the music teaching department. Since the mid-1950s until the late 1980s Prohaska was a contrabass player with the Zagreb Philharmonic Orchestra, the Radio Zagreb Symphony Orchestra, the Yugoslav Radio Orchestra, the Zagreb Jazz Quartet and many other musical ensembles. He was also the director of the Zagreb Festival of Popular Music (Zagrebfest) from 1967 to 1969.

In 1989 he retired from playing and became the conductor of Radio Zagreb's Dance Orchestra. Between 1996 and 1998 he was conductor of the Croatian Army Big Band. He also conducted orchestras at five Eurovision Song Contests (twice in London, twice in Dublin ad once in Madrid), and often performed around the world, including one of his more notable appearances at the 10th Monterey Jazz Festival in 1967, when he conducted the Don Ellis Orchestra rendition of his compositions. In 1966 Leonard Feather included him in The Encyclopedia of Jazz in the Sixties, and Willis Conover (the notable jazz broadcaster on the Voice of America) dedicated two of his regular programs to Prohaska and his music.

== Works ==
As a composer he is mainly known for his jazz music, but he also made a number of compositions for symphony orchestras, as well as music arrangements for popular Croatian singers such as Josipa Lisac, Gabi Novak and Arsen Dedić. Some of his compositions premiered at the Carnegie Hall in New York City and in Paris and were performed by the Modern Jazz Quartet, the Cincinnati Symphony Orchestra and the Paris Philharmonic Orchestra. He also worked as a score composer for a number of television and theatre plays, animated and films, ballets and choirs, and scored fifteen Croatian feature films. More recently, he has occasionally worked with the Zagreb Saxophone Quartet, the Zagreb Soloists, the Croatian Radiotelevision's Symphony Orchestra and their Big Band, and many others.

Prohaska was a longtime member of the Croatian Composers' Society and had served as its president twice (1967–1968 and 1988–1990). Prohaska won numerous awards for his work, including the Golden Arena for Best Film Music (1968), the Vladimir Nazor Award for Life Achievement (1988) and the Porin Award for Life Achievement (1995).
