= Ivica Vidović =

Croatian actor

- Born: 10 May 1939; Belgrade, Kingdom of Yugoslavia
- Died: 18 April 2011 (aged 71); Zagreb, Croatia
- Education: Academy of Dramatic Art
- Alma mater: University of Zagreb
- Occupation: Actor
- Years active: 1960s–2011
- Spouses: Zdenka Anušić (m. 1969; div. 1975) Mirjana Majurec (m. 1976; div. 1982) Gordana Gadžić (m. 1991)
- Children: 3

Ivica Vidović (10 May 1939 – 18 April 2011) was a Croatian actor who appeared in many classic Yugoslav films from the 1960s until his death in 2011.

== Career ==
Following his screen debut in 1962 film Rana jesen, Vidović appeared in many films gradually developing screen personality of a quiet, soft-spoken and mild-mannered intellectual often at odds with primitive and violent surrounding. This image served him very well both in serious dramas and comedies.

To the international audience, Vidović is arguably best known for the role of Soviet ice skater in 1971 cult film WR: Mysteries of the Organism. Across the former Yugoslavia, Vidović's best role was for the 1970 cult mini-series Naše malo misto.

In later years, Vidović starred in Naša mala klinika, a Croatian sitcom aired on Nova TV.

== Personal life ==
Vidović was married three times, two times with his screen partners. At first, he was married to Zdenka Anušić. With his second wife, Mirjana Majurec, from whom he divorced, he had one child. His third wife was the Serbian actress Gordana Gadžić, with whom he had two children.

== Filmography ==
- W.R.: Mysteries of the Organism (1971)
- The Rat Savior (1976)
- How the War Started on My Island (1996)
- Lapitch the Little Shoemaker (1997; voice)
- Marshal Tito's Spirit (1999)
- Fine Dead Girls (2002)
- The Society of Jesus (2004)
- What Is a Man Without a Moustache? (2005)
- Gdje pingvini lete (2008)
