= Ranko Marinković =

Croatian novelist and dramatist

- Born: 22 February 1913; Vis, Kingdom of Dalmatia, Austria-Hungary
- Died: 28 January 2001 (aged 87); Zagreb, Croatia
- Resting place: Komiža, Croatia
- Occupations: Novelist, dramatist
- Writing career
- Language: Croatian
- Period: 1939–1995
- Notable works: Ruke (1953), Cyclops (1965)

Ranko Marinković (22 February 1913 – 28 January 2001) was a Croatian novelist and dramatist.

Born in Komiža on the island of Vis (then a part of Austria-Hungary), Marinković's childhood was marked by World War I. He later earned a degree in philosophy at the University of Zagreb. In the 1930s, he began to make his name in Zagreb literary circles with his plays and stories.

His career was interrupted briefly during World War II. When his native island was occupied by Fascist Italy, he was arrested in Split and interned in the Ferramonti camp. After the capitulation of Italy, Marinković went to Bari, and then to the El Shatt refugee camp where he made contacts with Tito's Partisans. After the war, he spent time working in theatre.

His best known works are Glorija (1955), a play in which he criticised the Catholic Church, and Kiklop (1965), a semi-autobiographical novel in which he described the gloomy atmosphere among Zagreb intellectuals before the Axis invasion of Yugoslavia. Kiklop later was adapted into a 1982 movie directed by Antun Vrdoljak. In a 2010 Jutarnji list poll conducted among 41 Croatian scholars, writers, and public figures, Kiklop was chosen as the all-time best Croatian novel.

In the last years of his life Marinković embraced the political views of Franjo Tuđman, and became a member of the Croatian Democratic Union.

He died in Zagreb.

== Bibliography ==
=== Collections of novellas ===
- Proze (1948) [Proses]
- Ni braća ni rođaci (1949) [Neither Brothers nor Cousins]
- Oko božje (1949) [The Eye of God]
- Ruke (1953) [Hands]
- Pod balkonima (1953) [Under the Balconies]
- Poniženje Sokrata (1959) [The Humiliation of Socrates]
- Karneval i druge pripovijetke (1962) [The Carneval and Other Stories]

=== Novels ===
- Kiklop (1965) [Cyclops]
- Zajednička kupka (1980) [A Joint Bath]
- Never more (1993)
- U znaku vage (1995) [In the Sign of Libra]

=== Dramas ===
- Albatros (1939) [Albatross]
- Glorija (1956)
- Politeia (1977)
- Pustinja (1982) [The Desert]

=== Collections of critics and essays ===
- Geste i grimase (1951) [Gestures and Grimaces]
- Nevesele oči klauna (1986) [The Cheerless Eyes of a Clown]

== Awards ==
- Vladimir Nazor Award for Life Achievement (1975)
- Grand Order of King Dmitar Zvonimir (1995)
