= Bukvić =

Bukvić (Serbian Cyrillic: Буквић) is surname found most commonly in North Bosnia (Tesanj & Gracanica), Eastern Herzegovina, Croatia, and less commonly in Serbia. It derives from Bukva, which means "beech" in English. The suffix ić is a diminutive designation, or descendant designation. So, the last name can be translated as Beech's son. There are 6,659 documented bearers of this surname. Most bearers in Bosnia and Herzegovina are Serbs and Bosniaks, while in Croatia and Bačka Bunjevci most commonly bear it. It may refer to:

- Aleksandar Bukvić (1878-?), Serbian Politician
- Amar Bukvić (born 1981), Croatian actor
- Amir Bukvić (born 1951), Bosnian actor, playwright and screenwriter
- Ana Bukvić Ivković (1947–2016), Serbian painter
- Anda Bukvić Pažin, Croatian literary translator, theorist and critic
- Ante Bukvić (born 1987), Luxembourger footballer
- Danica Bukvić (born 1951), Serbian politician
- Dragomir Bukvić (born 1954), Serbian basketball player and coach
- Dragutin Bukvić (1885–1960), revolutionary and trade union activist
- Marin Bukvić (born 1989), Croatian actor
- Milorad Bukvić (born 1976), Serbian footballer
- Radivoje Bukvić (born 1979), Serbian actor
- Robert Bukvić (born 1980), German businessman and former basketball player of Croatian descent
- Semir Bukvić (born 1991), Bosnian football goalkeeper
- Svetozar Bukvić (1958–2020), Serbian politician
- Teza Bukvić (1927–1992), Croatian socio-political worker

== See also ==
- Bukvići
