= Slavko Sobin =

Croatian actor (born 1984)

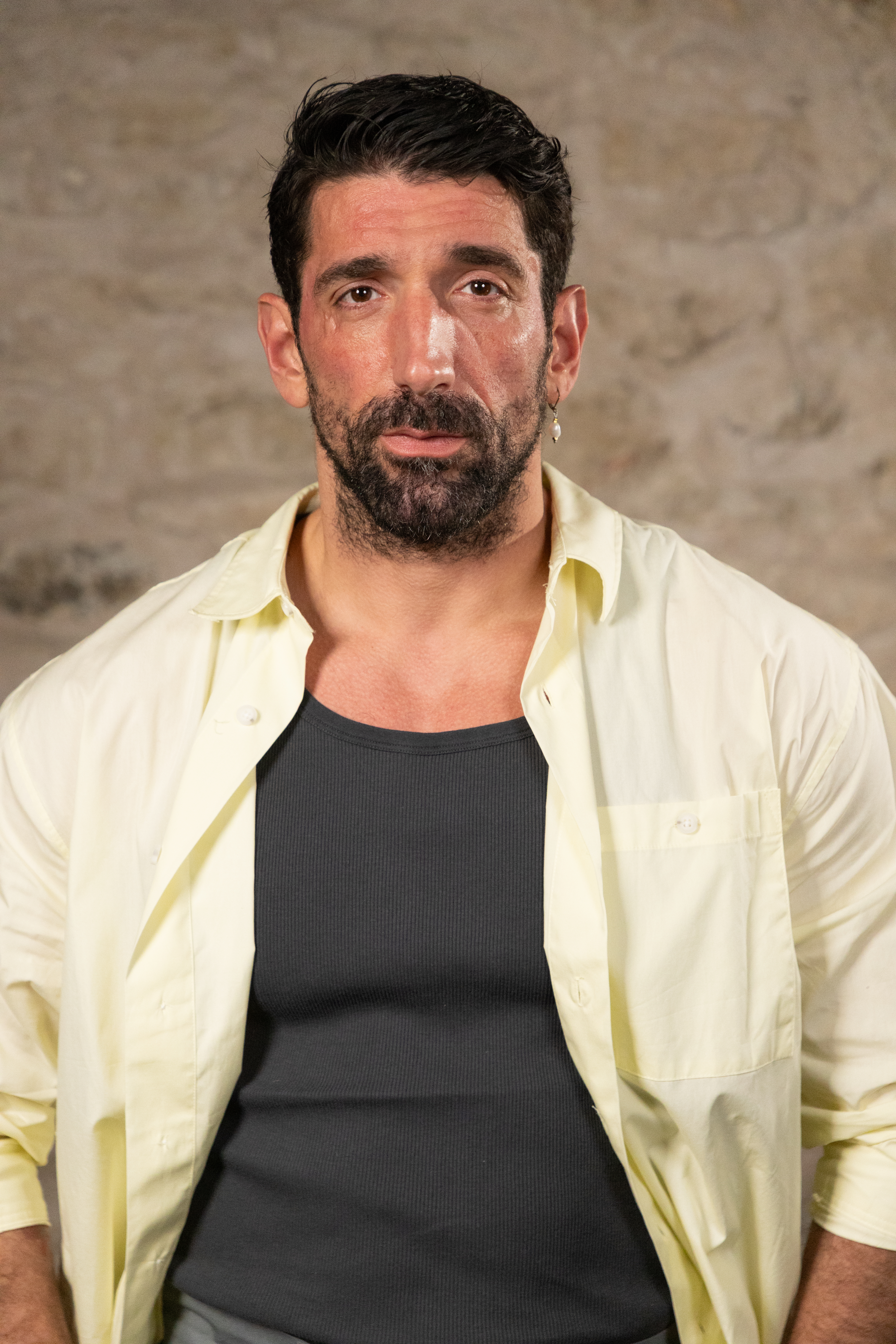
- Born: 13 November 1984 (age 41); Split, SR Croatia, SFR Yugoslavia
- Education: American Academy of Dramatic Arts
- Occupation: Actor
- Years active: 2007–present
- Mother: Mirjana Sobin

Slavko Sobin (born 13 November 1984) is a Croatian actor.

== Biography ==
At 18, Sobin moved to Los Angeles to study acting at the American Academy of Dramatic Arts, where he graduated in 2007.

Upon his return to Croatia, he moved to Zagreb and works as a freelance artist in several theaters: Merlin Theatre, Open University of Velika Gorica, and DK Dubrava.

In 2009, his first return to Split with the play Here Is Written the Title of the Drama About Ante in him, but now the theater GKM, and Brawling in Chioggia in the National Theatre in Split.

In 2015, he played a Meereenese fighter in the Game of Thrones episode "Sons of the Harpy", from the season 5.

Alongside Bojana Gregorić, Sobin hosted the 2019 Croatian Theatre Awards. He provided the voice of Gideon Grey in the Croatian dub of Zootopia (2016).

== Filmography ==
=== Film ===
Year	Title	Role	Director	Notes
2013	Priča o Mari iz Velog Varoša	The Postman	Igor Šeregi	Short film
2013	Marmelada		Josip Lukić	Short film
2014	No Thank You	Bartender	Samuli Valkama	Uncredited
2015	The High Sun	Mane / Dino	Dalibor Matanić	Dual role
2015	Life as a Coin	Dante	Franco Dipietro	Short film
2016	Zootopia	Gideon Grey	Byron Howard and Rich Moore	Croatian dub
2017	Virgin Boys	Damjan	S. Shridhar	
2017	The Zookeeper's Wife	Mr. Keller	Niki Caro	
2017	Renegades	Partisan Leader	Steven Quale	
2017	Papillon	El Caiman	Michael Noer	
2017	Secrets from the Past		Rasit Görgülü	
2018	Cold War	Sleuth 2	Paweł Pawlikowski	
2019	General	The Arab	Antun Vrdoljak	
2021	Space Jam: A New Legacy	LeBron James	Malcolm D. Lee	Croatian dub
2021	Peter Rabbit 2: The Runaway	Nigel Basil-Jones	Will Gluck	Croatian dub
2022	Savages	Turab	Dario Lonjak	
2022	Lightyear	Buzz Lightyear	Angus MacLane	Croatian dub
2023	97 Minutes	Orca	Timo Vuorensola	
2023	Death of the Little Match Girl	Globus	Goran Kulenović	
2023	Only When I Laugh	Frane	Vanja Juranić	
2023	The Optimist: The Bravest Act Is Truth	Herbert's Father	Finn Taylor	
2024	Salsa	The Thin Policeman	Dražen Žarković	
2024	Ljeto iza nas		Mia Bujan and Dorotea Ilečić Sever	Short film
2025	The Old Guard 2	Konrad	Victoria Mahoney	
2025	Surviving Earth	Vlad	Thea Gajic	
2025	Zootopia 2	Mayor Brian Winddancer	Jared Bush and Byron Howard	Croatian dub
2026	Extraordinary	Museum Guard	Marina Andree Škop and Vanda Raýmanová	
2026	The Last Roman God	Maximian	Božidar Domagoj Burić	
2027	Exposure †	Zoki	Alan Kralj	Post-production

=== Television ===
Year	Title	Role	Notes
2007–2008	Dobre namjere	Saša	2 episodes
2008	Ponos Ratkajevih	James	Season 1, episode 70
2008	Ne daj se, Nina	Ricardo Sierra	4 episodes
2008	Zauvijek susjedi	Gojko	Episode: "Golman"
2008	Hitna 94	Martin Radić	Season 1, episode 15
2009	Sve će biti dobro	Mr. Silanović	Season 1, episode 165
2009	Krim tim 2	Luka Šarić	Season 1, episode 200
2010	Dolina sunca	Matej Zlatarić	35 episodes
2010–2011	Najbolje godine	Inspector Edi Pavleković	3 episodes
2011–2012	Loza	Jerko	13 episodes
2012–2013	Ruža vjetrova	Petar	165 episodes
2015	Glas naroda	Neno Mrdulja	Episode: "Evo mene opet"
2015–2021	Crno-bijeli svijet	Đermano "Žungul" Kurtela	48 episodes
2015	Dig	Israeli Man	2 episodes
2015	Game of Thrones	Second Son	Episode: "Sons of the Harpy"
2015–2016	Ja to mogu	Himself (contestant)	
2015	Legends	Aslan Mansur	3 episodes
2016	Patrola na cesti	Frane	5 episodes
2016	Volim Hrvatsku	Himself (contestant)	Season 4, episode 6
2017	A mi kis falunk	Török	Episode: "A kamion"
2017–2018	Čista ljubav	Damir Vitez	13 episodes
2018	Počivali u miru	Vili Roksandić	Season 3, episode 6
2018	Ko te šiša	The Actor in the Soap Opera	Season 1, episode 14
2018	Na granici	Ljuban	33 episodes
2019	Ples sa zvijezdama	Himself (contestant)	Season 9 winner
2019	Žigosani u reketu	Referee	2 episodes
2019–2020	Drugo ime ljubavi	Igor Šarić	151 episodes
2019–2020	Black Sun	Ante Godina	5 episodes
2019	General	The Arab	Season 1, episode 2
2020–2021	Dar mar	Siniša Knežić	44 episodes
2021	Bogu iza nogu	Ahmed	9 episodes
2022	Mrkomir Prvi	Jure	Episode: "Mrkomir i ljubavni napitak"
2022	FBI: International	Deputy Chief Hofer	Episode: "Yesterday's Miracle"
2023	Pad	Stipe	3 episodes
2023	Django	Isaac Borowka	4 episodes
2023	Everybody Loves Diamonds	Rafael	3 episodes
2024	Kaos	Carl Crixus	2 episodes
2025	El Turco	Guido	6 episodes
2025	Blaž među ženama	Špiro	13 episodes
2025	Kotlina	Dr. Duje	2 episodes
2026	The Night Manager	Viktor	6 episodes
2026	Outer Banks	Henrique	5 episodes
2026–present	Slučajna obitelj	Gogi	9 episodes
2026–present	Divlje pčele	Lazar Krneta	28 episodes

=== Theatre ===
- 2007 : Casting Hunger Artist by Max Schumacher/Hiroko Tanahashi, režija: Max Schumacher/Hiroko Tanahashi, Teatar ITD, Zagreb
- 2008 : Postojani kositreni vojnik by H.C. Andersen, režija: Robert Waltl, Scena Gorica, Velika Gorica
- 2009 : Oh, kako je lijepa Panama by Janoch, režija: Marius Schiener, Dječje kazalište Dubrava, Zagreb
- 2009 : Ovdje piše naslov drame o Anti by Ivor Martinić, režija: Ivica Šimić, Gradsko kazalište mladih, Split
- 2009 : Ribarske svađe by Carlo Goldoni, režija: Vinko Brešan, Splitsko ljeto
- 2009 : E, moj Pinocchio by Dražen Ferenčina, režija: Dražen Ferenčina, Gradsko kazalište mladih, Split
- 2010 : Ukradena lopta by Petar Bosnić, režija: Petar Bosnić, Gradsko kazalište mladih, Split
- 2010 : Mačak s onoga svijeta by Ivica Ivanac, režija: Ladislav Vindakijević, Gradsko kazalište mladih, Split
- 2011 : Krčma, Alkar, Duga by Ivan Leo Lemo, režija: Ivan Leo Lemo, Gradsko kazalište mladih u Splitu
- 2011 : Stoliću, prostri se! by Braća Grimm, režija: Nina Kleflin, Gradsko kazalište mladih, Split
