= Tripković =

Origin
- Languages: Serbian, Croatian
- Region of origin: Serbia, Croatia

Other names
- Variant form: Trifković

Tripković (Serbian Cyrillic: Трипковић) is a Serbian surname.

At least 134 individuals with the surname died at the Jasenovac concentration camp.

It may refer to:

- Uroš Tripković (born 1986), Serbian professional basketball player
- Stefan Tripković (footballer, born 1993), Serbian football striker
- Stefan Tripković (footballer, born 1994), Serbian football midfielder
- Yves-Alexandre Tripkovic (born 1972), French-Croatian writer, stage director and translator
- Zlatko Tripković, Yugoslavian football midfielder

== See also ==
- Trifković, a surname
