= Sanja Nikčević =

Croatian academic and critic

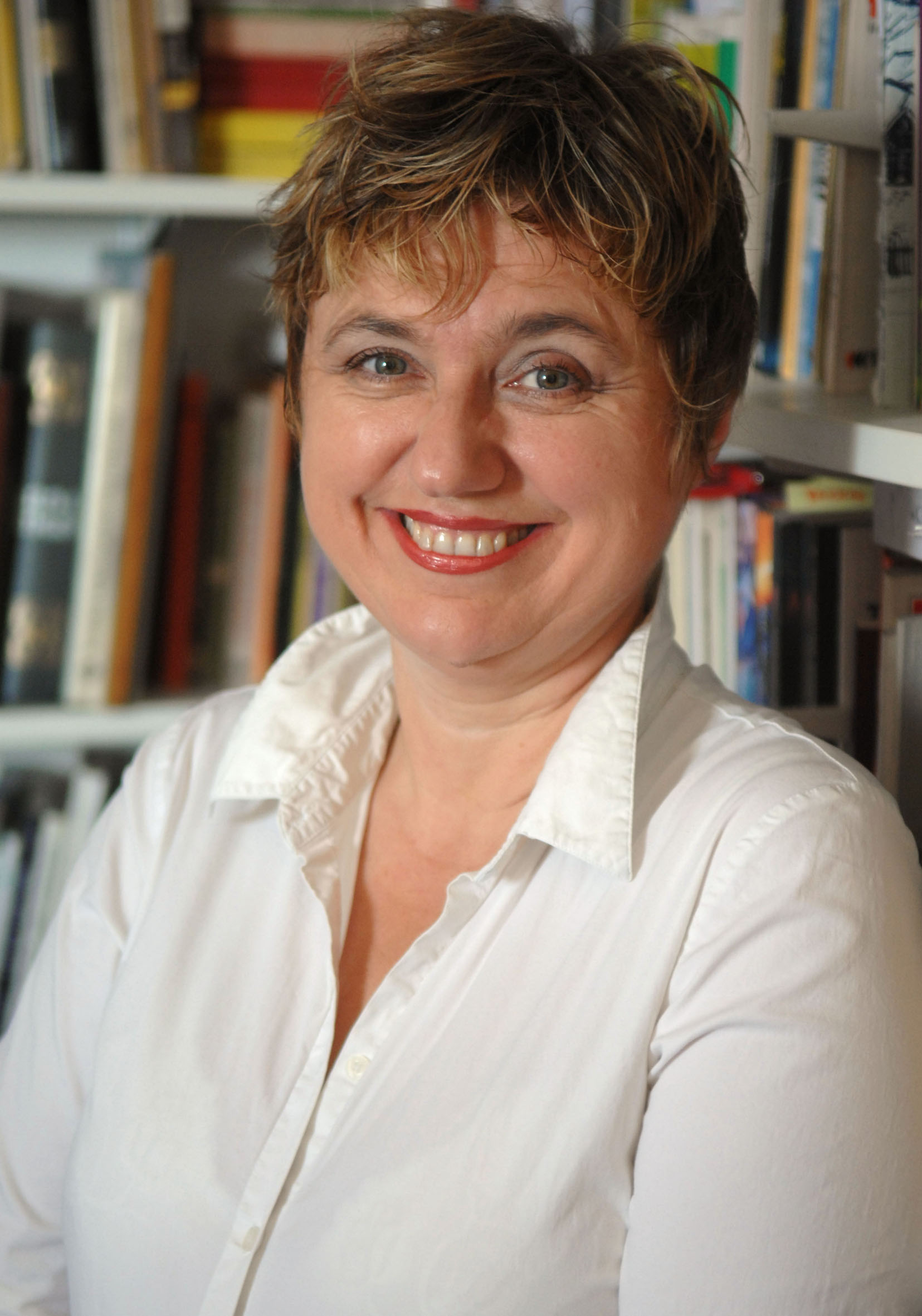
Sanja Nikčević

Sanja Nikčević (born 1960) is a Croatian theatre critic and distinguished professor of theatre history in the drama department of the Arts Academy of Osijek, Croatia. She is also head of the drama module of the doctoral program in literature at the Faculty of Philosophy, University of Osijek (Osijek, Croatia). She is the president of the Croatian Critics' Association and Governing Board of Matica hrvatska. Nikčević lives in Zagreb, Croatia.

== Education and work ==
Nikčević was born in Varaždin. At the Faculty of Philosophy in Zagreb she obtained a BA (French language and comparative literature, 1984), MA (1993) and Ph.D. (1998) in American drama. She worked as a journalist and theatre critic for the Croatian daily newspaper Večernji list (1985–1993), was an advisor for theatre in the Croatian Ministry of Culture (1996–1997), and was a freelancer.

== Academic career ==
Nikčević was a Fulbright scholar (CUNY 1995, mentor M. Carlson; UCSB 2002, mentor W. D. King) and lectured at the University of California, Santa Barbara in 2001. Since 2003, she has been employed in the English department (Faculty of Philosophy, Osijek), teaching courses on American and British drama, where she still works in the Ph.D. literature program. Since 2007 she has been employed at the Arts Academy in Osijek (UAOS) where she teaches courses on the history of world drama and theatre.

== Activities in international and national associations ==
Nikčević was the founder and first president (1994–2000) of the Croatian Center of ITI-UNESCO where she organized numerous international events (seminars, drama colony, exchange writers and directors, presentation of theatre of other countries in Croatia and vice versa). Since 2004 she was secretary, since 2010 she was president of a national theatre critics' organization (HDKKT), and since 2014 she was a member of the main governing board of Matica hrvatska. She has served as an EXCOM board member for ITI Worldwide for two terms and is an active member of numerous international and American associations of scholars and critics (ASTR, ATHE, IFTR, AICT, and ATCA).

== Editorial activities ==
At the Croatian center of ITI Nikčević founded and edited the publication Croatian drama (the only publication on Croatian theatre in English) and Mansions. She was the editor of Mansions until 2004 and published more than thirty books. From 1998 to 2002 she was the editor of the Croatian mainstream theatre journal Theatre (Kazalište). She founded Ars Academica (a series of textbooks for the Arts Academy) where she was editor from 2009 to 2013.

== Publishing activities and field of interest ==
Her main topics of research are American drama, contemporary European drama, Croatian war drama and theatre criticism and history of theatre. She has participated in more than one hundred national, American, and international symposiums. She has published more than one hundred articles on European and American theatre in English which were published in the US (SSEP, PAJ), Hong Kong, Japan, Poland, Bosnia and Herzegovina, Hungary, Slovakia, Macedonia and Slovenia in academic or theatre journals and academic-edited volumes, and forwards of books. Nikčević publishes theatre reviews in the Croatian weekly cultural newspaper (Vijenac, Hrvatsko slovo). She has published six books and edited six anthologies.

=== American drama ===
In Croatia Nikčević has edited the Anthology of American Plays (1993) in two volumes and published three books on American drama: The Subversive American Drama or Sympathy for Losers (1994); Affirmative American Drama or Long Live the Puritans(2003) and Losers' Genius in Our Town(Zagreb, 2006). In these books she introduced a new classification of American drama based on the attitude of plays toward the main American myth, the American dream. Plays depicting losers and failures of the American dream (from Eugene O’Neill, Arthur Miller, Tennessee Williams, Edward Albee and David Mamet, for example) she calls subversive. Plays that show characters who can accept their position in life and make the most of it (mainly solving their problems and achieving the American dream) she designates as affirmative American plays (from Thornton Wilder through comedies and melodrama to Harling's Steel Magnolias, Margaret Edson, etc.).

=== European drama and new trends ===
Nikčević's book on the spread of in-yer-face theatre from its origin in 1990s Britain all over Europe, New European Drama or The Great Deception, (Zagreb, 2005) was both attacked and praised. It has been translated into Slovak (Nova Europska drama alebo vel'ky podvod, Bratislava, 2007) and Bulgarian (Нова европейска драма или голямата измама, Ruse, 2009). Selected chapters were published in several languages – English (New Theater Quarterly, August 2005), Polish (Wszystko ma swoje skutki, Dialog 1/2005. str. 122–135.) and Hungarian (Csináljunk új európai drámát u Szinhaz, Hungary, July 2005). It has been included as a rare non-English book as literature on the official website of in-yer-face theatre by British critic Aleks Sierz, whose book was the first to define the genre. Nikčević's book received the prestigious Croatian Award (Petar Brečić, 2006). After five years, in 2009, the second edition was published, including not just an additional chapter about the destiny of new European drama over those five years, but also reactions to the book (attacks and praise).

=== Croatian drama ===
Nikčević edited the first anthology of Croatian plays published outside of Croatia: Anthology of Contemporary Croatian Drama (Macedonia, 2002). Her book on Croatian drama What is Croatian drama to us? (Zagreb, 2008), deals with some less-fashionable but very important writers (Tanja Radović, Miro Gavran), genres (the comedies of Ivan Kušan or literary cabaret of Boris Senker) and topics (the disappearance of political drama after the fall of communism, religious plays during wartime, etc.)

She offered a new classification of Croatian drama (U potrazi za glasom između emocije, politike i intertekstualnosti. Skica za studiju o četvrt stoljeća hrvatske drame) based upon the attitude of the drama toward reality, where she proves that this attitude has three points: politics, emotions and intertextuality. Some decades are dominant in dealing with one point: the 1960s and 1970s with politics as a means for the destruction of the individual (Ivan Kušan, Ivo Brešan, Dubravko Jelačić Bužimski, Nino Škrabe, Mujićić, Boris Senker), the 1980s dealing with emotions and the inner world of the hero (Miro Gavran, Lada Kaštelan, Mate Matišić), authors of the 1990s are in search of intertextuality (Ivan Vidić, Asja Srnrc Todorović, Tomislav Zajec), while the latest period is in search of the voice between these three points.

=== Croatian war drama (on the Homeland war) ===
Edited:

1. Anthology of Croatian War Plays 1991-1995 (Zagreb, 2011) where she included 11 plays (Nino Škrabe: Dvije sestre, Davor Špišić: Dobrodošli u rat, Matko Sršen: Farsa od gvere, Katja Šimunić: Blueblanche, tango i rat, Milan Grgić: Sveti Roko na brdu, Lada Martinac/Snježana Sinovčižć: Živim, Goran Tribuson: Doviđenja u Nuštru, Zvonimir Zoričić: Tatarski biftek, Miroslav Mađer: Srijemski put, Zvonimir Majdak: Smrtonosni povratak, Miro Gavran: Deložacija).
2. Anthology of Croatian War Comedies 1991-1997 (Vinkovci, 2013) where she included eight comedies (Milica Lukšić: Lov na medvjeda tepišara, Tahir Mujičić/Boris Senker: Bratorazvodna parnica, Lydia Scheuermann Hodak: Žurim, dolazi mi moja maserka, Zvonimir Zoričić: Tatarski biftek, Miro Gavran: Deložacija, Ivan Kušan: Tko je Sveti Stefan, Ljubomir Kerekeš: Povratak ratnika, Ivo Brešan: Utvare).
3. Anthology of Croatian Post-War Plays 1996-2011 (Zagreb 2014) where she included 12 plays (Lydia Scheuermann Hodak: Slike Marijine [1992/1996], Pavao Pavličić: Olga i Lina [1996], Hrvoje Barbir Barba: Telmah [1997], Vlatko Perković: Deus ex machina [1997], Slobodan Šnajder: Ines & Denise [1997], Dubravko Mihanović: Žaba [2004], Gordana Ostović: Parsifal [2005], Tena Štivičić: Fragile [2005], Amir Bukvić: Djeca sa CNN-a [2006], Igor Hamer: Jura, samo jučerašnja vijest [2007], Lada Martinac: Ko me to pokriva? [2009], Miro Međimorec: Vukovarski nokturno [2011]).

The anthologies and Nikčević's theoretical work on the topic (Plays on Homeland War of one hundred titles from cabaret till allegory, published in the journal Republika 7-8/2012. p. 67-91) are changing the usual beliefs that there are no war plays from the Homeland War or that these plays are not of a good quality. Her research showed that from 1990 to 2011 more than one hundred professional Croatian plays were published or performed, plays that are connected with the topic either directly, through a character connected with the war, or through allegory (speaking about another war but with direct inspiration from the Homeland War).

=== Theatre criticism ===
Nikčević edited a collection on essays in English Theatre Criticism Today (2002) as a result of three symposiums on theatre criticism that she organized in the Croatian centre of ITI (Pula 1998 and 1999, Zagreb 2000). She published the first theoretical book on theatre criticism in Croatia, titled Theatre Criticism or Inevitable Companion (2012), where she compared two different attitudes toward theatre criticism (European and American) with a new definition of the genre. She is member of the American Theatre and Drama Society and was member of the International Committee of the American Theatre Critics Association.

== Acknowledgements ==
- Honorary citizen of Waterford, Connecticut (1999).
- Order of the Croatian Interlace by the President of the Republic of Croatia, for the promotion of Croatian culture (2000).
- Petar Brečić Award, for book on theatre (New European Drama or Big Deception) (2006).
- Antun Gustav Matoš Award by Matica Hrvatska, for best critical book (Theatre Criticism or Inevitable Companion) (2012).
- Andrija Buvina Award (2018).

== Main Publications ==
=== Books (Croatian) ===
1. Theatre Criticism or Inevitable Companion (2012, Award A.G. Matoš).
2. What is Croatian Drama to Us?, Naklada Ljevak, Zagreb, 2008
3. Losers' Genius in Our Town, Zagreb, Faculty of Philosophy, 2006
4. New European Drama or Big Deception, Meandar, Zagreb, 2005 (translated: into English NTQ 83/2005, Slovak, 2007, Bulgarian 2009., Award Petar Brečić 2006., second edition Zagreb, 2009),
5. Affirmative American Drama or Long Live the Puritans, Croatian center of ITI, Zagreb, 2003
6. Subversive American Drama or Sympathy for Losers, CDM, Rijeka, 1994

=== Translations (other languages) ===
1. "British Brutalism, the ‘New European Drama’, and the Role of the Director" NTQ (New Theater Quarterly), published by Cambridge University Press, 83/2005, p. 255-272
2. "Csináljunk új európai drámát" (Let's make new European drama) Szinhaz, Hungary, July 2005 (translated from English by Keszthelyi Kinga)
3. "Wszystko ma swoje skutki" (Everything has consequences), Dialog (Poland) 1/2005. str. 122–135.

=== Articles published in English (selection) ===
1. "Sanja Nikcevic: The Comeback of Political Drama in Croatia: Or How to Kill a President by Miro Gavran", in: Haedicke, Susan C., Deirdre Heddon, Avraham Oz and E.J. Westlake (eds.), Political Performances. Theory and Practice. IFTR/FIRT Political Performances Working Group. Amsterdam/New York, NY, 2009, IV, 379 pp. Pb: 978-90-420-2606-3
2. "Croatian Theatre and the War 1992-1994", in: Dennis Barnett and Arthur Skelton (eds.), Theatre and performance in Eastern Europe. The Changing Scene, The Scarecrow press, Plymouth, 2008.
3. "How to Impose Violence as a Trend?", in: Ian Herbert and Kalina Stefanova (eds.), Theatre and Humanism in a World of Violence, (24th congress of the IACT), St. Kliment Ohridski University Press, Sofia, 2009. p. 57–72.
4. "Angles on the stage Religious Theatre in Croatia 1945-1989; 1999-1994; 1996-2002" in Europassion. Kirche-Konflikte-Menschenrechte. Rudolf Grulich zum 60. Geburstag, Gehard Hess Verlag bad Schussenried, 2006.
5. “Actors Under Power”, Theatre Year Book 2003 Theatre Abroad, ITI Japan Centre, Tokyo, 2003, p. 160-167
6. "Political Correctness, Identity, War and Lost Communication" in Lužina, Jelena (ed.) Balkan Theatre Sphere, Fakultet dramskih umjetnosti, Skopje, Macedonia, 2003., p. 89-95.

== Literature ==
- Nikčević, Sanja (August 2005). "British Brutalism, the 'New European Drama', and the Role of the Director". New Theatre Quarterly. 21 (3): 255–272. doi:10.1017/S0266464X05000151. S2CID 145737016.
- Nikčević, Sanja (2004). "Rape as War Strategy: A Drama from Croatia". PAJ: A Journal of Performance and Art. 26 (2): 110–114. doi:10.1162/152028104323048340. S2CID 202639150. Project MUSE 54937.
- Nikčević, Sanja (2014). "Comedy in the Croatian war of independence or the fight with humor for bodily and spiritual health". Dani Hvarskoga kazališta: Građa i rasprave o hrvatskoj književnosti i kazalištu. 40 (1): 374–396.
