= Croatian Association of Theatre Critics and Theatre Scholars =

Croatia Association of Theatre Critics and Theatre Scholars (Croatian: Hrvatsko društvo kazališnih kritičara i teatrologa; or HDKKT) is a professional, nonprofit organization for Croatian theater scholars and critics.

== History ==
The association was founded on 22 October 1975 at its founding assembly in Zagreb and registered into the Civil Association Register on 9 March 1976.

HDKKT is a member of the International Association of Theatre Critics (AICT/IACT) and collaborates with the International Federation for Theatre Research (FITR/IFTR). It was founded with a goal to develop and promote the quality of the profession, cooperation with other similar associations and theatres in Croatia and abroad, and to protect the moral and material interests of its members. The association's structure comprises: Assembly, Executive Committee and President, Supervisory Committee, and Court of Honour. The association was first based at Ilica 42 and later at Amruševa Street 19, in Zagreb. It has about 50 active members and 15 retired, and since 2013 dance critics are also admitted.

The association is funded by Croatia's Ministry of Culture. Shortly after its foundation, HDKKT launched Theatrology Library (Teatrologijska biblioteka) with Nikola Batušić as editor in chief, and from 1979 till 1992 thirty-three titles were published. In 1994 Theatrology Library merged with Library Prolog (Biblioteka Prolog), former CKD, which was inherited by AGM (Zagreb). The new library was named Actor's Booklet Prolog (Glumišna knjižnica Prolog) with an editorial board of Nikola Batušić, Branko Hećimović and Igor Mrduljaš. From 1992 till 1997 the library published eleven books in cooperation with AGM, after which AGM completely took over the publishing activities.

In the 1980s, the association introduced the Award for the Best Play of the Season through a members' survey.

== Demeter's Award ==
Since 2012, HDKKT has awarded the Demeter's Award for Lifetime Achievement. The first one was awarded to one of the founders of HDKKT, president, historian and theatrologist Branko Hećimović, in 2012; the second wnet to secretary general, president, critic and theatrologist Igor Mrduljaš in 2013; and the third went to theatrologist, critic, educator and president of HDKKT Boris Senker. The Demeter Award is awarded on the day of publication of Dimitrija Demeter's critique of the first professional play in Croatian, Juran i Sofija by Ivan Kukuljević Sakcinski, in the journal Danica ilirska on 13 July 1840, which is considered the beginning of the Croatian theatre criticism.

=== List of awardees ===
- 2012 Branko Hećimović
- 2013 Igor Mrduljaš
- 2014 Boris Senker
- 2015 Boris B. Hrovat
- 2016 Vlatko Perković
- 2017 Antonija Bogner Šaban

== Managing authority ==
=== Executive Committee ===
Sanja Nikčević (president), Alen Biskupović (secretary general), Mira Muhoberac, Antonija Bogner Šaban, Martina Petranović

=== Supervisory Committee ===
Andrija Tunjić, Goran Ivanišević, Anđela Vidović

=== Court of Honour ===
Boris Senker, Olga Vujović, Tomislav Kurelec

== Former presidents and secretaries general ==
=== Presidents ===
Petar Selem (1976–1980), Branko Hećimović (1980–1982), Marija Grgičević (1982–1984), Boris Senker (1984–1988), Nedjeljko Fabrio (1988–1991), Mani Gotovac (1991–1993), Antonija Bogner Šaban (1993–2001), Boris B. Hrovat (2001–2005), Igor Mrduljaš (2005–2010) and Sanja Nikčević (2010 – ).

=== Secretaries general ===
Giga Gračan (1976–1978), Igor Mrduljaš, Branko Vukšić (1991–1993), Ana Lederer (1993–2001), Sanja Nikčević (2001–2010), Ljubica Anđelković (2010–2012), Lidija Zozoli (2012 – 13 June 2014), Alen Biskupović (13 June 2014 – )

== Theatre Research Library: List of editions ==
- 1. Slavko Batušić Od Griča do Lutecije, Zagreb, 1979. ed. Nikola Batušić, for publisher Petar Selem
- 2. Frano Čale Na mostu Thalija, Zagreb, 1979. ed. Nikola Batušić, for publisher Petar Selem
- 3. Petar Selem Otvoreno kazalište, Zagreb, 1979. ed. Nikola Batušić, for publisher Igor Mrduljaš (tajnik)
- 4. Branko Hećimović Dramaturški triptihon, Zagreb, 1979. ed. Nikola Batušić, for publisher Petar Selem
- 5. Marko Fotez Kazališna hodočašća, Zagreb, 1981. ed. Nikola Batušuć, for publisher Branko Hećimović
- 6. Georgij Paro Iz prakse, Zagreb, 1981. ed. Nikola Batušić, for publisher Branko Hećimović
- 7. Petar Selem Množenje mjesta, Zagreb, 1983., ed. Nikola Batušić, for publisher Marija Grgičević
- 8. Frano Čale Igre u Njarnjas-gradu, Zagreb, 1984. ed. Nikola Batušić, for publisher Marija Grgičević
- 9. Igor Mrduljaš Dramski vodič. Od Vojnovića do Matišića, Zagreb, 1984. ed. Nikola Batušić, for publisher Marija Grgičević
- 10. Nikola Batušić Skrovito kazalište, Zagreb, 1984. ed. Boris Senker, for publisher Marija Grgičević
- 11. Tihomil Maštrović Hrvatsko kazalište u Zadru, Zagreb, 1985. ed. Nikola Batušić, for publisher Boris Senker
- 12. Boris Senker Kazališni čovjek Milan Begović, Zagreb, 1985. ed. Nikola Batušić, for publisher Igor Mrduljaš
- 13. Ivo Hergešić Zapisi o teatru, Zagreb, 1985. ed. Nikola Batušić, for publisher Boris Senker
- 14. Milutin Cihlar Nehajev Izabrani kazališni spisi, Zagreb, 1986. ed. Nikola Batušić, for publisher Boris Senker
- 15. Marko Marulić Drame, Zagreb, 1986. ed. Nikola Batušić, for publisher Boris Senker
- 16. Mani Gotovac Dubrovačke mišolovke, Zagreb, 1986. ed. Nikola Batušić, for publisher Boris Senker
- 17. Dalibor Foretić Borba sa stvarima. Krležin teatar 1972–1986., Zagreb, 1986. ed. Nikola Batušić, for publisher Boris Senker
- 18. Ljudevit Galic Glumčeva ratna zapamćenja, Zagreb, 1987. ed. Nikola Batušić, for publisher Boris Senker
- 19. Nedjeljko Fabrio Kazalištarije, Zagreb, 1987. ed. Nikola Batušić for publisher Boris Senker
- 20. Čedo Prica Stvarnost i iluzija, Zagreb, 1987. ed. Nikola Batušić, for publisher Boris Senker
- 21. Boris Senker Begovićev scenski svijet, Zagreb, 1987. ed. Nikola Batušić, for publisher Nedjeljko Fabrio
- 22. Marijan Matković Miroslav Krleža, život i djelo, Zagreb, 1988. ed. Nikola Batušić, for publisher Boris Senker
- 23. Eliza Gerner Osvrnuh se sjetno, Zagreb, 1988. ed. Nikola Batušić, for publisher Boris Senker
- 24. Antonija Bogner Šaban Marionete osvajaju Zagreb, Zagreb, 1988. ed. Nikola Batušić, for publisher Boris Senker
- 25. Igor Mrduljaš Dubravko Dujšin, poslovi i dani, Zagreb, 1988. ed. Nikola Batušić, for publisher Nedjeljko Fabrio
- 26. Božidar Violić Lica i sjene, Zagreb, 1989. ed. Nikola Batušić, for publisher Nedjeljko Fabrio
- 27. Mladen Englesfield Hrvatski prevoditelji Shakespearea, Zagreb, 1989. ed. Nikola Batušić, for publisher Nedjeljko Fabrio
- 28. Lada Čaće-Feldman Brešanov teatar, Zagreb, 1989. ed. Nikola Batušić, for publisher Nedjeljko Fabrio
- 29. Tomislav Durbešić Eto tako, Zagreb, 1989. ed. Nikola Batušić, for publisher Nedjeljko Fabrio
- 30. Georgij Paro Made in USA, Zagreb, 1990. ed. Nikola Batušić
- 31. Nikola Vončina Kazalište, radio, televizija, Zagreb, 1990. ed. Nikola Batušić, for publisher Nedjeljko Fabrio
- 32. Boris Senker Pogled u kazalište, Zagreb, 1990. ed. Nikola Batušić, for publisher Nedjeljko Fabrio
- 33. Ivan Lozica Izvan teatra. Teatribilni oblici folklora u Hrvatskoj, Zagreb, 1990. ed. Nikola Batušić, for publisher Nedjeljko Fabrio

=== Glumišna knjižnica Prolog (in cooperation with AGM, Zagreb, only titles including HDKKT as co-publisher) ===
- 1. Antonija Bogner Šaban Tragom lutke i pričala, Zagreb, 1994.
- 2. Tahir Mujičić, Boris Senker vokrležje ili Dva fašnika, Zagreb, 1994.
- 3. Tomislav Bakarić Malleus maleficarum. Drame, Zagreb, 1994.
- 4. Igor Mrduljaš Ad hoc cabaret, Zagreb, 1995.
- 5. Nikola Vončina Stvaralaštvo svjetskog ugleda, Zagreb, 1995.
- 6. Ivan Kušan Svrha od slobode. Drame, Zagreb, 1995.
- 7. Branko Hećimović Razgovori s Pometom, Desdemonom, i poljskim Židovom, AGM, Zagreb, 1995.
- 8. Antonija Bogner Šaban Kazališni Osijek, Zagreb, 1997.
- 9. Igor Mrduljaš Dramski vodič. Od Vojnovića do Matišića, Zagreb, 1997. ed. Bože Ćović
- 10. Cecily Berry Glumac i glas, Zagreb, 1997.
- 11. Tomislav Bakarić Mrtva priroda s pticom, Zagreb, 1997.
