= Nikčević =

Nikčević is a South Slavic surname. Notable people with the name include:

- Ivan Nikčević, Serbian handballer
- Novica Nikčević, Slovenian football player and coach
- Sandra Nikčević, Montenegrin handballer
- Sanja Nikčević, Croatian theatre critic and historian
- Vojislav Nikčević, Montenegrin linguist
