= Ladislav Tulač =

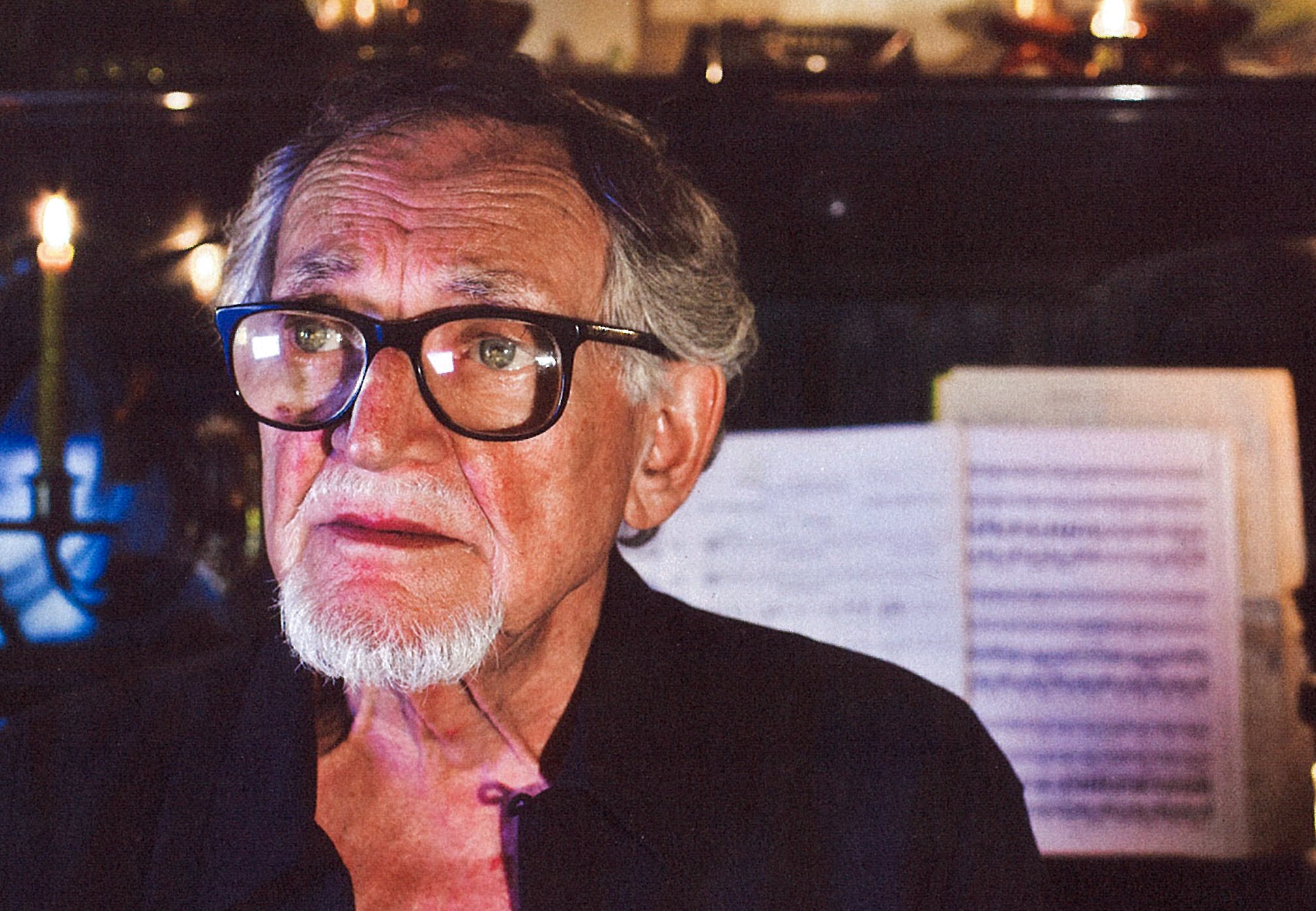
- Ladislav Tulač in front of his piano
- Born: 28 February 1939; Varaždin, Croatia
- Died: 9 May 2017 (aged 78); Zagreb, Croatia
- Occupation(s): composer, musician, actor, producer, educator

Ladislav Tulač (February 28, 1939 in Varaždin – May 9, 2017 in Zagreb) was a well known Croatian composer, producer, musician, and musical educator, most famous for his musicals targeted at children and adolescents.

== Biography ==
Ladislav Tulač, also known as Laci, was born in Varaždin, Croatia, where he completed elementary and both regular (Gymnasium) and musical high school. He moved to Zagreb to study pharmacy at University of Zagreb. Here he started singing in Academic Choir Ivan Goran Kovačić. He dropped out of college at his final academic semester in order to pursuit his two true passions: music and theater.

He became fully employed at Zagrebačko Kazalište Mladih in 1964, where he worked as a pianist and musical educator. At this time, he also became a member of Vocal Quartet Kenda, where he sang jazz.

In 1970 he became self-employed and continued collaborating not only with Zagrebačko Kazalište Mladih, but also with virtually every theater in the region, as well as with local TV and radio stations.

In 1971 he composed music for musical Mačak Džingiskan i Miki Trasi based on a short story by Vesna Parun, directed and adopted for theater by Zvjezdana Ladika. This poetic portrayal of life on Croatian Coast in early 20th century became known as his signature work, and has been staged in theaters across Europe, from Berlin to Skopje, most recently in Šibenik, where it opened 2012 International Children's Festival

His collaboration with Zvjezdana Ladika yielded another cult musical in 1982 called U koga se uvrglo to dijete, based on a short story by Hungarian author Eva Janikovszky. It addresses the universal challenges adolescents face. The musical contains a string of original rock'n'roll songs, for which Zvjezdana Ladika wrote lyrics in a language used by adolescents.

== Works ==
=== Music for Musicals ===
- Mačak Džingiskan i Miki Trasi (V. Parun), 1971.
- Sedmi kontinent (Z. Ladika), 1973.
- Ferije u Moskvi (A. Kuznjecov), 1973.
- Na vjetru svirala (Z. Ladika), 1975.
- Hodl de Bodl (A. E. Greidanus), 1978.
- Halugica (V. Nazor), 1981.
- U koga se uvrglo to dijete (E. Janikovszky), 1982.
- Srebrnom stazom za Djedom Mrazom (Z. Ladika), 1983.
- Hir ljubavi (W. Shakespeare/Z. Ladika), 1984.
- Osvajanje kazališta (D. Jelačić Bužimski), 1985.
- Zagrebačko ludo ljeto (A. Kuznjecov/Z. Ladika), 1988.
- Legenda o nastanku imena Stella Maris (S. Juraga), 1989.
- Modra rijeka (Z. Ladika), 1992.
- Kavaliri gospođice Kolombine (L. Chancerel), 1994.
- Bila jenput jena pčela (Z. Ladika), 1998.
- Đak veseljak i prometni znak (Z. Ladika), 2003.

=== Music for Theater Plays ===
- M. Antić: Plavi čuperak, 1965.
- Z. Ladika: Kolo oko svijeta, 1967.
- Z. Ladika, Zdravo đaci veseljaci, 1968.
- J. Hašek: Dobri vojak Švejk, 1969.
- T. Bakarić: Amerika, Amerika, 1970.
- I. Kušan: Toranj, 1971.
- I. Kušan: Svrha od slobode, 1971.
- Z. Ladika: Plameni cvjetovi, 1971.
- M. Čečuk: Mudri Cigo, 1971.
- J. K. Oleša: Tri trbonje, 1971.
- I. Kušan: Vodvilj, 1972.
- A. Krmpotić: Jao meni, probudio se car, 1972.
- E. Švarc: Dva javora, 1972.
- D. Cesarić: Slap, 1972.
- Z. Ladika: Mali zaljubljeni svijet, 1972.
- T. Mujičić/B. Senker/N. Škrabe: Vitezovi otrulog stola ili vola oko stola, 1973.
- T. Bakarić: Anno Domini, 1973.
- Z. Majdak: Kužiš stari moj, 1973.
- Z. Ladika: Godišnja doba, 1973.
- Z. Ladika/V. Ognjenović Nešić: Pozdravi nekog, 1974.
- W. Shakespeare: Hamlet, 1974.
- B. Brecht: U džungli gradova, 1974.
- Z. Ladika: Kolo oko domovine, 1975.
- Z. Ladika: Priča o doručku kralja, 1975.
- M. Krleža: Hrvatska rapsodija, 1975.
- T. Bakarić: Malj koji ubija, 1976.
- I. Kušan: Naivci, 1976.
- W. Shakespeare: San ljetne noći, 1978.
- Z. Ladika: Pozdrav djeci svijeta, 1979.
- W. Shakespeare, Oluja, 1980.
- C. Marlow: Tragična povijest života i smrti dr. Faustusa, 1982.
- M. Bjažić: Blizu je daleki Djeda Mraz, 1982.
- Grupa autora: Tražimo Djeda Mraza, 1983.
- L. Ustinov: Nedirka, 1984.
- M. Bjažić: Pjetlić, mačak i lija, 1985.
- M. Krleža: Povratak Filipa Latinovića, 1985.
- Z. Ladika: Razigrano djetinjstvo, 1985.
- Z. Ladika: Igrajmo se, igrajmo, 1985.
- J. P. Sartre: Prljave ruke, 1984.
- M. Bjažić/Z. Ladika: Vesele šumske priče, 1986.
- Z. Ladika: Pričalo i Malena, 1987.
- M. Gavran: Noć bogova, 1987.
- Z. Ladika: Dolazi nam Univerzijada, 1987.
- I. B. Mažuranić, Ribar Pallunko i njegova žena, 1989.
- W. Shakespeare: Romeo i Julija, 1989.
- I. Kušan: Lažeš Melita, 1995.
- A. Zemljar: Golootočke varijacije, 1995.
- A. Šoljan: Kako lijepo počinje dan, 1996.
- I. B. Mažuranić: Šuma Striborova, 1996.
- Z. Ladika: Medin rođendan, 1998.
- A. Šoljan: Dobre vijesti, gospo, 1999.
- A. Šoljan: Romanca o tri ljubavi, 2000.
- Aristofan: Priče djeda Aristofana, 2002.

=== Music for Radio Dramas ===
- M. Buljan: Balada o pometačici ulica, 1972.

=== Television Soundtracks ===
- G. Babić/S. Praljak: Blesan i tulipan, 1974.
- I. Kušan: Sopzilj, 1978.
- Z. Kolarić Kišur: Bijeli zec, 1979.
- Crvena kraljica, 1981.
- I. Brešan: Ptice nebeske, 1988.

=== Movie Soundtracks ===
- B. Ištvančić: Rastanak, 1993.

=== LPs and CDs ===
- Mačak Džingiskan i Miki Trasi, 1978.
- Miševi i mačke naglavačke, 1979.
- U koga se uvrglo ovo dijete, 1983.
- Kužiš stari moj, 1983.
- Mačak Džingiskan i Miki Trasi, 2001.
- Zvjezdana prašina, 2009.
