= Vjeran =

Vjeran is a masculine given name found in Croatia. Notable people with this name include:

- Vjeran Simunić (born 1953), a Croatian footballer and manager
- Vjeran Zuppa (1940 – 2023), a Croatian writer
