= &TD Theatre =

Theater in Croatia

&TD Theatre (Croatian: Teatar &TD), alternatively spelled ITD, is a theatre in Zagreb, Croatia. It is regarded as one of the three most important experimental Zagreb theatres in recent times, alongside Exit Theatre and Zagreb Youth Theatre. Many Croatian actors performed here, in addition to world famous individuals such as Eugène Ionesco, Dario Fo and Jiří Menzel. Its artistic directors and chairmen included Miro Gavran and Vjeran Zuppa.

== Notable shows ==
- Stilske vježbe, starring Pero Kvrgić, an adaptation of Exercises in Style premiered at this theatre on January 19, 1968, and the longest continuously running theatre show with the same cast in the world, for which it was included in the Guinness World Records in 2009
- San i ludilo ('Dream and Madness'), adaptation of Tin Ujević's poetry, premiered in 1976. starring Goran Martović and Arsen Dedić.
- Mrzim istinu!, play by Oliver Frljić, more than 200 times played
