= Ozren Grabarić =

Croatian actor (born 1980)

- Born: 17 July 1980 (age 45); Zagreb, SR Croatia, Yugoslavia
- Education: Academy of Dramatic Art
- Occupations: Actor, professor
- Years active: 1999–present

Ozren Grabarić (born 17 July 1980) is a Croatian actor.

== Filmography ==
Key
†	Denotes films that have not yet been released

=== Film ===
Year	Title	Role	Notes
2005	Sleep Sweet, My Darling	Professor Laslo	
2005	Reći ću ti jednom - Nemoj	Rečić	
2006	Sin moj!	Andrej Bacelj	Short film
2007	Ambrozija	Zoran	
2008	Plava čegrtuša	Slaven Martinović	
2009	Mlako ljeto	Mauro	Uncredited
2010	Mother of Asphalt	Ozren	
2011	Koko and the Ghosts	Josip Milić	
2011	Blurs	Zdravko	
2012	Vegetarian Cannibal	Mario Filipović	
2012	Iris	Hugo	
2012	Životinjsko carstvo	Dad	
2012	Hives	Matija	
2012	Zagorski specijalitet	Police Officer	
2013	Zagonetni dječak	Josip Milić	
2014	Ljubav ili smrt	Josip Milić	
2014	Svinjari	Matija Antun Reljković	
2015	Kornjače	Ranko, Ratko and Rajko	Short film
2016	Sve najbolje	Martin	
2017	Posljednji Bunar	Father	
2018	Poljice	Nenad	
2019	Moj dida je pao s Marsa	Robot Dodo	Voice; Motion-capture
2022	Sixth Bus		

=== Television ===
Year	Title	Role	Notes
2004	Nora Fora	Oto	Voice role Main cast, 40 episodes
2006	Žutokljunac	Sport Commentator Domagoj; Blind Man on Balcony	2 episodes
2006–2008	Luda kuća	Bruno	12 episodes
2007–2009	Operacija Kajman	Krešimir Horvat	14 episodes
2009, 2013	Stipe u gostima	Domini, director	2 episodes
2009	Zakon!	Ćupi-Dupi	3 episodes
2009–2010	Moja 3 zida	Ozren	Main cast, 20 episodes
2009–2011	Bitange i princeze	Želimir Matić	6 episodes
2011–2017	Brak je mrak	Ljubo	9 episodes
2013–2014	Počivali u miru	Boris Drobnjak	10 episodes
2014	Maestro	Himself	Winner
2015	Glas naroda	TV Director	Episode: U teška vremena
2015–2019	Crno-bijeli svijet	Professor Djuro Marksist	9 episodes
2019	Ko te šiša	Marić	Episode: Sjajno, sjajno, sjajno
2020	Direktor	Dražen Flajpan	Lead role
2020–present	Mrkomir Prvi	Slavomir	Main cast
2023–present	Oblak u službi zakona	Nikola Oblak	Main cast

=== Voice-over roles ===
Year	Title	Role
2003	The Lion King	Ed
2004	Home on the Range	Barry
2004	The Road to El Dorado	Tulio
2004	Sinbad: Legend of the Seven Seas	Jed
2004	Caillou's Holiday Movie	Jonah; Grandpa; Leo
2005	Chicken Little	Runt of the Litter
2005	Bratz: Rock Angelz	Cameron
2005	The Magic Roundabout	Train; Moose; Skeleton Guards
2005	Lassie	Rowlie; Alf Patterson
2005	Hoodwinked!	2-Tone; Tommy; Glen
2005	Madagascar	Marty
2005	Valiant	Lofty
2006	Open Season	Elliot
2006	Happily N'Ever After	Munk
2006	Barnyard	Freddy
2006	Flushed Away	Mr. Malone
2006	Barbie in the 12 Dancing Princesses	Derek; Mr. Fabian
2006	The Ugly Duckling and Me!	William
2006	Scooby-Doo! Pirates Ahoy!	Woodenleg Wally; Mr. Mysterio
2006	Tom and Jerry: Shiver Me Whiskers	Red Pirate Ron; Spike; Blue Pirate Bob; Purple Parrot Chuck; The Skull
2006	Casper's Scare School	Casper the Friendly Ghost
2006	Ice Age: The Meltdown	Eddie
2006	The Wild	Cloak; Camo
2006	Curious George	Curious George
2006	Monster House	Skull
2006	Happy Feet	Raul
2006	Cars	Snot Rod
2007	Bee Movie	Barry Benson
2007	Donkey Xote	Rucio
2007	Meet the Robinsons	Dor-15
2007	The Simpsons Movie	Professor Frink; Dr. Julius Hibbert; Comic Book Guy; Nelson Muntz; Cletus Spuckler; Santa's Little Helper; Sideshow Mel; Scratchy; Squeaky-Voiced Teen; Otto Mann; Mike Dirnt
2007	Teenage Mutant Ninja Turtles	Michelangelo
2007	Ratatouille	Lalo
2007	Shrek the Third	Rumpelstiltskin
2008	Kung Fu Panda	Master Crane
2008	Igor	Brain
2008	Sleeping Beauty	Maleficent's Goons
2008	WALL-E	PR-T
2008	Madagascar: Escape 2 Africa	Marty
2008	Horton Hears a Who!	Morton
2008	Open Season 2	Elliot
2009	Ice Age: Dawn of the Dinosaurs	Eddie
2009	Monsters, Inc.	Randall Boggs
2009	Arthur and the Revenge of Maltazard	Proscuitto
2009	Cloudy with a Chance of Meatballs	Steve the Monkey
2009	Up	Charles Muntz
2009	Planet 51	Skiff
2010	Shrek Forever After	Rumpelstiltskin
2010	Beauty and the Beast	LeFou
2010	Toy Story 2	Al McWhiggin
2010	Tangled	Pascal and Maximus
2010	Marmaduke	Carlos
2010	Megamind	Megamind
2010	How to Train Your Dragon	Gobber
2011	Kung Fu Panda 2	Master Crane
2011	The Smurfs	Chef Smurf
2011	Gnomeo & Juliet	Fawn
2011	Animals United	Winston the Tortoise
2011	Rio	Tipa; Bat
2011	Cars 2	Professor Zundapp
2011	Winnie the Pooh	Piglet
2011	Astral Rhythm	Al Pacino; Wayne Knight; Randy Quaid; Richard Pryor
2011	Puss in Boots	Humpty Dumpty
2011	Rango	Furgus
2012	Madagascar 3: Europe's Most Wanted	Marty
2012	A Turtle's Tale 2: Sammy's Escape from Paradise	Big D Penguin Maurice
2012	The Lorax	Brett and Chet
2012	Wreck-It Ralph	King Candy / Turbo; M. Bison
2012	Hotel Transylvania	Quasimodo
2012	Brave	The Raven; Gordon
2012	Ice Age: Continental Drift	Eddie
2013	Monsters University	Randall Boggs
2013	The Croods	Belt
2013	Legends of Oz: Dorothy's Return	Tin Man; Tugg / Tank
2013	Justin and the Knights of Valour	Melquiades / Karolius
2013	Despicable Me 2	Eduardo "El Macho" Perez
2013	Turbo	Kim-Ly
2013	Cloudy with a Chance of Meatballs 2	Steve the Monkey
2014	Rio 2	Spoonbill
2014	Penguins of Madagascar	Short Fuse
2014	The Snow Queen 2	Lokum
2014	How to Train Your Dragon 2	Gobber
2014	Mr. Peabody and Sherman	Leonardo da Vinci
2015	The Good Dinosaur	Thunderclap
2015	Blinky Bill the Movie	Jacko
2015	Inside Out	Anger's Dad
2015	The Little Prince	The Conceited Man
2015	Minions	Professor Flux; Frankie Fishlips
2015	Hotel Transylvania 2	Marty
2015	Home	Captain Smek
2016	Kung Fu Panda 3	Master Crane
2016	Ice Age: Collision Course	Eddie
2016	The Jungle Book	King Louie
2016	Zootopia	Duke Weasleton
2017	Ferdinand	Angus
2017	Paddington 2	Phoenix Buchanan
2017	Despicable Me 3	Clive
2017	Beauty and the Beast	LeFou
2018	The Grinch	The Grinch
2018	Elliot the Littlest Reindeer	Lemondrop
2018	Ralph Breaks the Internet	Double Dan
2018	Hotel Transylvania 3	Abraham Van Helsing
2018	Spider-Man: Into the Spider-Verse	Spider-Ham/Peter Porker
2019	How to Train Your Dragon 3	Gobber
2019	The Addams Family	Gomez Addams
