= Ivor Martinić =

Croatian playwright and screenwriter (born 1984)

- Born: 7 June 1984 (age 42); Split, SR Croatia, SFR Yugoslavia
- Occupations: Playwright, screenwriter
- Writing career
- Notable work: My Son Just Walks a Bit Slower

Ivor Martinić (born 7 June 1984) is a Croatian playwright and screenwriter.

== Biography ==
Award-winning Croatian playwright, completed an MA in Dramaturgy at the Academy of Dramatic Art in Zagreb. His major works include: A Play about Mirjana and those around her, My Son Just Walks a Bit Slower and As long as we die in orderly way. His work has been translated into 20 languages.

His play A play about Mirjana and those around her was produced by Yugoslav Drama Theatre with Serbian actress Mirjana Karanović playing Mirjana. It has also been produced in Ljubljana City Theatre, Croatian National Theatre in Zagreb, Picadero Theatre in Buenos Aires, DeuxExMachina in Caracas and many others. Croatian director Zrinko Ogresta directed a movie People Can't Fly based on the play in 2020.

His most notable work My Son Just Walks a Bit Slower was produced by Zagreb Youth Theatre. Production has won over 20 awards including the Golden Laurel Award at the MESS Festival in Sarajevo, the Croatian Association of Dramatic Artists Award and the Marul Award, all for Best Play. Martinić’s play explores three generations of a family while centering itself on a young man, Branko, who is in a wheelchair. The central relationship is between a son and his mother who tries to keep up her spirits and live in denial. It has also been produced in Asunción, Buenos Aires, Belgrade, Caracas, Lima, Madrid, Mexico City, Montevideo, Paris, Santiago...

In 2016 he was part of Pen World Voices International Play Festival by Martin E. Segal Theatre Center in New York City as one of eight of the most respected dramatists in the world.

His play As long as we die in orderly way was produced by Zagreb Youth Theatre in 2019. The same year he premiered play Would be a shame if the plants died.

Since 2016, Ivor Martinić lives in Barcelona.
