= Yves-Alexandre Tripković =

French writer and stage director

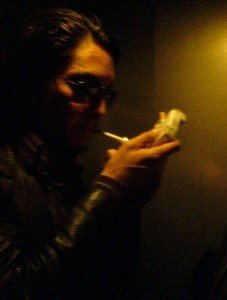
- Yves-Alexandre Tripković
- Born: 6 October 1972 (age 53); Paris, France
- Education: Sorbonne (University of Paris)
- Occupations: Writer; stage director; translator
- Writing career
- Period: 21st century
- Genres: Novel, drama
- Notable work: "Krizantema"
- Movement: Bohemianism

Yves-Alexandre Tripković is a French writer, stage director and translator.

== Biography ==
Yves-Alexandre Tripković was born in Paris to a Croatian father and Japanese mother. He spent his parts of his childhood living in Paris, Toronto, Tokyo and Zagreb.

After high school graduation in Zagreb, Croatia, Tripković moved back to Paris where he still resides. He hold Arts, Literature and Civilisation Master's degree in Slavistics (Etudes Slaves) at Sorbonne (University of Paris).

He is the creative director of the production/festival/publishing house THEATROOM (formerly Theatroom noctuabundi).

== Bibliography ==
- Krizantema, Disput, Zagreb, 2008
- Pariz nema jutra, Durieux, Zagreb, 2007
- Hermesov poučak, Zigo/Katapult, Rijeka, 2006

== Stage Director ==
- La Mort d'Ismaïl aga , Ivan Mažuranić, Ambassade de la République de Croatie, Paris, 2016
- Marseille blues, Henrik Aeshna, Festival THEATROOM, Paris, 2012
- L'Exposition, Claudio Magris, Théâtre de la passerelle, Paris, 2012
- Closer, Patrick Marber, Festival à contre sens, Paris, 2010
- Tulipe ou la Protestation, Romain Gary, Théâtre de Nesle, Paris, 2009
- Creont's Antigone, Miro Gavran, Théâtre de Nesle, Paris, 2005

== Assistant Director ==
- Le Maître Bâtisseur Hayruddin II, Ljubica Ostojić, director Sava Andjelkovic, Sorbonne, Paris, 2016
- Tesla, Darko Lukić & Stevan Pešić, director Sava Andjelkovic, Sorbonne, Paris, 2015
- L'Europe nue, Milko Valent, director Sava Andjelkovic, Sorbonne, Paris, 2014

== Translations ==
- Huddersfield, Uglješa Šajtinac, Le Fantôme de la liberté, Paris 2018
- Tesla, Darko Lukić & Stevan Pešić, Sorbonne, Paris, 2015
- Nous les grands fêtards, d’après les chants populaires de Pannonie, Sorbonne, Paris, 2015
- Madame Hamlet, Alfi Kabiljo, THEATROOM, Paris, 2015
- Turska noć, Philippe Videlier, Durieux, Zagreb, 2010
- O Dendizmu & Georgeu Brummellu, Barbey d'Aurevilly, Modernist, Varaždin, 2009
- Tehnosmoza, Mathieu Terence, Tehnosmoza, Novela, Zagreb, 2009
- Constantin Craintdieu, Simo Mraović, Theatroom noctuabundi, Paris, 2008
- L'Europe nue, Milko Valent, Theatroom noctuabundi, Paris, 2007
- Badem – intimna priča, Nedžma, OceanMore, Zagreb, 2006
- Comment tuer le président, Miro Gavran, Theatroom noctuabundi, 2006
- Pohvala parazitu, Lucian, Pohvala parazitu, Jesenski i Turk, Zagreb, 2005
- Adam et Eve, Miroslav Krleža, Most/The Bridge, Zagreb, 2003

== Photography ==
Tripković created a serial of photography of people on streets of Tokyo and Paris.

== Awards ==
- Marin Držić Award – Krizantema, Disput, Zagreb, 2008
- Slavić for the best first book – Hermesov poučak, Zigo/Katapult, Rijeka, 2006
