= Blurs (film) =

2011 film

- Film poster
- Directed by: Aldo Tardozzi
- Written by: Aldo Tardozzi
- Starring: Iskra Jirsak
- Release date: 19 July 2011 (Pula Film Festival)
- Running time: 90 minutes
- Country: Croatia
- Language: Croatian

Blurs (Croatian: Fleke, also released as Spots) is a 2011 Croatian drama film written and directed by Aldo Tardozzi.

== Cast ==
- Iskra Jirsak as Lana
- Nika Miskovic as Irena
- Živko Anočić as Igor
- Ozren Grabarić as Zdravko
- Goran Grgic as Lanin tata
- Sanja Vejnovic as Lanina mama
