= Koko and the Ghosts =

2011 film

- Film poster
- Croatian: Koko i duhovi
- Directed by: Daniel Kušan
- Written by: Ivan Kušan; Daniel Kušan
- Based on: Koko i duhovi by Ivan Kušan
- Produced by: Ankica Jurić Tilić
- Starring: Antonio Parač
- Cinematography: Mario Sablić
- Release date: 16 July 2011 (Pula Film Festival)
- Running time: 90 minutes
- Country: Croatia
- Language: Croatian

Koko and the Ghosts (Croatian: Koko i duhovi) is a 2011 Croatian adventure film directed by Daniel Kušan. It is based on the children's novel of the same name by Ivan Kušan, Daniel Kušan's father.

== Cast ==
- Antonio Parač as Koko Milić
- Nina Mileta as Marica Milić
- Kristian Bonačić as Zlatko
- Filip Mayer as Miki
- Ivan Maltarić as Božo
- Ozren Grabarić as Josip Milić
- Dijana Vidušin as Neda Milić
- Predrag Vušović as Vincek
- Franjo Dijak as Drago Horvatić
- Almira Osmanović as Ruža

== Production ==
Originally titled Koko i duhovi, development for the film began in October 2010 as a co-production between HRT, Kinorama and Continental film.

== Sequel ==
The film was followed by a commercially successful sequel in 2013, Zagonetni dječak.
