= Trifković =

Origin
- Language: Serbo-Croatian

Other names
- Variant form: Tripković

Trifković (Serbian Cyrillic: Трифковић) is a Serbian surname.

At least 130 individuals with the surname died at the Jasenovac concentration camp.

It may refer to:

- Damjan Trifković (born 1987), Slovenian professional footballer
- Srđa Trifković (born 1954), Serbian-American author
- Kosta Trifković (1843-1875), Serbian writer and comediographer

== See also ==
- Tripković, a surname
