= Crno-bijeli svijet (TV series) =

- Genre: Comedy; Drama
- Created by: Goran Kulenović; Igor Mirković
- Country of origin: Croatia
- Original language: Croatian
- No. of seasons: 4
- No. of episodes: 48

Original release
- Network: HRT 1
- Release: 2 March 2015 – 2 March 2021

Crno-bijeli svijet ("Black and White World") is a Croatian comedy and drama television series created by Goran Kulenović and Igor Mirković. It ran on HRT 1 from 2 March 2015 to 2 March 2021.

== Plot ==
The series follows two Zagreb families in the early 1980s. Ksenija Kipčić is a single mother whose son, Voljen "Kipo" Kipčić, a journalist, and his best friend Đerman "Žungul" Kurtela live a fast-paced life in Zagreb, filled with parties, concerts, and journalistic pursuits. Kipo's younger brother, Žac, faces puberty challenges amid changing family dynamics when Ksenija secretly marries Dominik Bertalan. The story explores their lives in turbulent times, focusing on family and friendships.

== Cast ==
- Filip Riđički as Voljen Kipčić "Kipo"
- Slavko Sobin as Germano Kurtela "Žungul"
- Jelena Miholjević as Ksenija Bertalan (Kipčić)
- Karlo Maloča as Želimir Kipčić "Žac"
- Franjo Kuhar as Dominik Bertalan
- Sreten Mokrović as Juraj Kipčić "Jura"
- Anica Dobra as Jagoda Miličević
- Kaja Šišmanović as Una Miličević
- Sara Stanić as Marina

== Series overview ==
Season	Episodes	Originally released	
Season	Episodes	First released	Last released
1	12	2 March 2015	19 March 2015
2	12	7 October 2016	30 December 2016
3	12	7 January 2019	25 March 2019
4	12	14 December 2020	2 March 2021
