= Danica Bukvić =

Serbian politician

Danica Bukvić (Serbian Cyrillic: Даница Буквић; born October 22, 1951) is a politician in Serbia. She has served in the National Assembly of Serbia since 2016 as a member of the Socialist Party of Serbia (SPS).

== Early life and private career ==
Bukvić was born and raised in Lazarevac, Belgrade, in the People's Republic of Serbia in the Federal People's Republic of Yugoslavia. She graduated from the medical faculty at the University of Belgrade in 1976 and began working at the Institute for Endemic Nephropathy in Lazarevac the following year, eventually becoming its director. She received her PhD in 1996 and has authored and co-authored several texts in her field.

== Political career ==
Bukvić began her political career at the municipal level, becoming deputy leader of the Lazarevac municipal assembly in 2012. She first sought election to the National Assembly in the 2014 Serbian parliamentary election, receiving the 107th position on a coalition electoral list led by the Socialist Party. This was too low a position for election to be a realistic prospect, and she was not elected.

Bukvić was promoted to the twenty-sixth position on the Socialist-led list for the 2016 parliamentary election and was declared elected when the list won twenty-nine mandates. She is currently a member of the parliamentary health and family committee, a deputy member of three other committees, and a member of the parliamentary friendship groups for Bosnia and Herzegovina, Egypt, Montenegro, the Netherlands, Switzerland, and the United Kingdom. The Socialist Party is part of Serbia's coalition government, and Bukvić accordingly serves as a member of the government's parliamentary majority.
