= Zlatko Tripković =

Yugoslavian footballer

Personal information
- Date of birth: 18 February 1949 (age 77)
- Place of birth: SFR Yugoslavia
- Position: Midfielder

College career
Years	Team	Apps	(Gls)
1972	Davis & Elkins College		

Senior career*
Years	Team	Apps	(Gls)
1971	Hamilton Croatia		
1974	Baltimore Comets	10	(0)
1975	Rhode Island Oceaneers		
- * Club domestic league appearances and goals

Zlatko Tripković (born 18 February 1949) is a Yugoslavian retired footballer who played as a midfielder.

== Career ==
Tripković emigrated to the United States in 1968. In 1971, he played in the National Soccer League with Hamilton Croatia. In 1972, he played college soccer with Davis & Elkins College, and was named to the All West Virginia Intercollegiate Athletic Conference Soccer Team. He also served as an assistant coach for the college team. He was prevented from playing at the college level in 1973 as he signed several professional contracts before the commencement of the season.

In 1974, he played in the North American Soccer League with Baltimore Comets. He made 10 appearances for Baltimore. In 1975, he played in the American Soccer League with Rhode Island Oceaneers.
