= Mrkomir Prvi =

- Genre: Comedy
- Written by: Zoran Lazić
- Directed by: Filip Maloča
- Starring: Goran Navojec; Ozren Grabarić; Ecija Ojdanić; Paško Vukasović; Roko Sikavica; Mirna Mihelčić
- Theme music composer: Mate Matišić
- Country of origin: Croatia
- Original language: Croatian
- No. of seasons: 5
- No. of episodes: 83 (+1 special) (list of episodes)

Production
- Producer: Ivan Maloča
- Editor: Ivan Živalj
- Running time: 30 minutes
- Production company: Interfilm

Original release
- Network: HRT 2
- Release: 31 December 2020
- Network: HRT 1
- Release: 19 December 2021 – present

Mrkomir Prvi (Croatian for 'Mrkomir the First'), also stylized as Mrkomir I., is a Croatian comedy television series. Set in 850, the series follows the everyday trails of inhabitants of an Early Middle Ages principality, which is ruled by the title character Mrkomir (Goran Navojec).

The series' pilot episode was broadcast as a special on 31 December 2020 on HRT 2. The first full season premiered on 19 December 2021 on HRT 1. The fourth season premiered on 2 October 2024.

== Premise ==
It is the year 850, Middle Ages. Mrkomir, a Croatian duke who rules the principality, is incredibly ambitious but also foolish, which frequently brings him to ruin. Although he is illiterate, he pretends to be literate and relies on Slavomir, who holds several important positions at the palace, including head of the secret service, named the Duke's Operational Agency (KOA), as well as advisor and cupbearer. Slavomir frequently expands his riches and power by taking advantage of his position and Mrkomir's faith in his judgment. But Mrkomir's greatest issue is that he is a vassal of the Franks, and he longs for independence so that he can fulfill his lifelong desire of becoming king and turning his principality into a kingdom.

== Cast ==
- Goran Navojec as Mrkomir
- Ozren Grabarić as Slavomir
- Ecija Ojdanić as Anuša, Mrkomir's wife
- Paško Vukasović as Krivomir
- Roko Sikavica as Držiha
- Mirna Mihelčić as Maruša, Mrkomir's daughter
- Marinko Prga as Želimir, a servant (season 1)

== Episodes ==
Season	Episodes	Originally released		
Season	Episodes	First released	Last released	Network
Pilot		31 December 2020		HRT 2
1	13	19 December 2021	13 March 2022	HRT 1
2	20	31 December 2022	16 June 2023	HRT 1
3	20	24 November 2023	17 May 2024	HRT 1
4	20	2 October 2024	12 March 2025	HRT 1
5	TBA	17 March 2026	TBA	HRT 1

== Production ==
The filming of the fourth season concluded in July 2024.
