= Bukvići =

- Village
- Location within Bosnia and Herzegovina
- Coordinates: 44.149531°N 17.5958829°E
- Country: Bosnia and Herzegovina
- Entity: Federation of Bosnia and Herzegovina
- Canton: Central Bosnia
- Municipality: Novi Travnik

Area
  - Total: 0.37 sq mi (0.97 km^{2})

Population (2013)
  - Total: 327
  - Density: 870/sq mi (340/km^{2})
- Time zone: UTC+1 (CET)
  - Summer (DST): UTC+2 (CEST)

Bukvići is a village in the municipality of Novi Travnik, Bosnia and Herzegovina.

== Demographics ==
According to the 2013 census, its population was 327.

Ethnicity in 2013
Ethnicity	Number	Percentage
Bosniaks	313	95.7%
Croats	13	4.0%
other/undeclared	1	0.3%
Total	327	100%
