= List of Mrkomir Prvi episodes =

Mrkomir Prvi is a Croatian comedy television series. Set in the year 805, it chronicles the daily lives of people who live in an Early Middle Ages principality that is governed by Mrkomir.

The first episode of the series aired as a special on 31 December 2020 on HRT 2. The series premiered on 19 December 2021 on HRT 1.

== Series overview ==
| Season | Episodes | Originally released | | |
| Season | Episodes | First released | Last released | Network |
|---|---|---|---|---|
| Pilot | | 31 December 2020 | | HRT 2 |
| 1 | 13 | 19 December 2021 | 13 March 2022 | HRT 1 |
| 2 | 20 | 31 December 2022 | 16 June 2023 | HRT 1 |
| 3 | 20 | 24 November 2023 | 17 May 2024 | HRT 1 |
| 4 | 20 | 2 October 2024 | 12 March 2025 | HRT 1 |
| 5 | TBA | 17 March 2026 | TBA | HRT 1 |

== Episodes ==
=== Pilot (2020) ===
| No. overall | No. in season | Title | Original release date |
|---|---|---|---|
| – | – | "Pilot" | 31 December 2020 |
Duke Mrkomir is a Croatian ruler from the early medieval period who is assisted by his troublesome and corrupt cupbearer Slavomir, who also serves as the head of the intelligence agency K.O.A. (Duke's Secret Service). His wife, Anuša, is also a key member of his court and they occasionally argue. Mrkomir is unhappy because he still holds the title of duke and aspires to become king, and he has an illegitimate son, Krivomir, who is the court mace-bearer. He wants to marry his daughter to a Frankish man, but ultimately chooses to wed a Bosnian prince in order to inherit their principality. Slavomir is not interested in Abbot Držiha's plans to construct schools and educate the populace in line with the English ruler's example. Everyone is shocked by the Bosnian prince's appearance when he first arrives at Mrkomir's court.

=== Season 1 (2021–22) ===
| No. overall | No. in season | Title | Original release date |
|---|---|---|---|
| 1 | 1 | "Mrkomir provodi pravdu" | 19 December 2021 |
Riots break out in the principality due to famine caused by the lord Tudorić through excessive borrowing from the Russians. To calm the riots, Mrkomir arrests Tudorić and, on Slavomir's advice, organizes a trial for Tudorić that will be a spectacle for the people.
| 2 | 2 | "Mrkomir i blagdani" | 26 December 2021 |
| 3 | 3 | "Mrkomirov gambit" | 2 January 2022 |
| 4 | 4 | "Mrkomir ide na odmor" | 9 January 2022 |
| 5 | 5 | "Mrkomir i čudesni eliksir" | 16 January 2022 |
| 6 | 6 | "Mrkomir u boljem svjetlu" | 23 January 2022 |
| 7 | 7 | "Mrkomir i kreditna omča" | 30 January 2022 |
| 8 | 8 | "Mrkomir i novo oružje" | 6 February 2022 |
| 9 | 9 | "Mrkomir i ljubavni napitak" | 13 February 2022 |
| 10 | 10 | "Mrkomir obnavlja kneževinu" | 20 February 2022 |
| 11 | 11 | "Mrkomir i kamen mudraca" | 27 February 2022 |
| 12 | 12 | "Mrkomir i igre na sreću" | 6 March 2022 |
| 13 | 13 | "Mrkomir i voće razdora" | 13 March 2022 |

=== Season 2 (2022–23) ===
| No. overall | No. in season | Title | Original release date |
|---|---|---|---|
| 14 | 1 | "Mrkomir i transfer stoljeća" | 31 December 2022 |
| 15 | 2 | "Mrkomir uvodi novu valutu" | 3 February 2023 |
| 16 | 3 | "Mrkomir i zbrinjavanje otpada" | 10 February 2023 |
| 17 | 4 | "Pedeset nijansi Mrkomira" | 17 February 2023 |
| 18 | 5 | "Mrkomir i sportski duh" | 24 February 2023 |
| 19 | 6 | "Mrkomir i ravnopravnost spolova" | 3 March 2023 |
| 20 | 7 | "Mrkomir nosi naočale" | 10 March 2023 |
| 21 | 8 | "Opsada ili nikada" | 17 March 2023 |
| 22 | 9 | "Mrkomir i lažni rat" | 24 March 2023 |
| 23 | 10 | "Mrkomir i pali anđeo" | 31 March 2023 |
| 24 | 11 | "Mrkomir u paklu ovisnosti" | 14 April 2023 |
| 25 | 12 | "Mrkomir i modna napetost" | 21 April 2023 |
| 26 | 13 | "Mrkomir omiljen u narodu" | 28 April 2023 |
| 27 | 14 | "Mrkomir i đavolji izum" | 5 May 2023 |
In addition to demanding a collective bargaining agreement, increased salary, paid overtime, preferential pensions, holiday pay, Christmas bonuses, and more, the executioners are threatening to go on strike. Vedran, Mrkomir's half-brother, who lives in far-off Zagorje, comes to the Principality during the most severe unrest.
| 28 | 15 | "Mrkomir i meteorologija" | 12 May 2023 |
Farmers and their crops are facing an increasing number of challenges due to unpredictable weather, an issue Mrkomir is expected to solve.
| 29 | 16 | "Mrkomir i sraz kreposti" | 19 May 2023 |
Mrkomir has made up his mind to wed Krivomir. Finding Krivomir a suitable girl to marry is a difficult task that Mrkomir gives to Slavomir and Držiha.
| 30 | 17 | "Mrkomir i glas razuma" | 26 May 2023 |
Mrkomir's childhood sweetheart, Kleofa, comes to vitist. The issue is that Kleofa is coming to retrieve the ducats she borrowed Mrkomir at interest, not to woo him again as Anuša worries.
| 31 | 18 | "Mrkomir i izručenje Slavomira" | 2 June 2023 |
Because Slavomir committed crimes on their territory, the Franks demand that he be extradited. Mrkomir is in anguish and must comply with Frank's ultimatum. Slavomir threatens to divulge certain awkward secrets to Mrkomir, while at the same time issuing the Frankish ultimatum.
| 32 | 19 | "Mrkomir i zmaj" | 9 June 2023 |
Once more, Mrkomir is not receiving any peace from the serfs; they are requesting that he deal with the dragon that is robbing them of their lambs this time.
| 33 | 20 | "Mrkomirova kućne čarolije" | 16 June 2023 |
Mrkomir and his irate rival and rival Pribislav, engage in a culinary duel.

=== Season 3 (2023–24) ===
| No. overall | No. in season | Title | Original release date |
|---|---|---|---|
| 34 | 1 | "Mrkomir i nova zabava" | 24 November 2023 |
The enthusiasm at Mrkomir's court appears to have subsided; there are no longer any conflicts, no serfs are rising up in rebellion, and even the Franks are not inquiring as to the whereabouts of the ducats who were sent to assist the Principality in its quest for greater riches.
| 35 | 2 | "Mrkomir se kulturno uzdiže" | 1 December 2023 |
The Franks must choose a principality to serve as the new cultural capital. Will Pribislav or Mrkomir receive this tremendous honor? The animosity between Mrkomir and Pribislav is also intensifying as both dukes anxiously await the results of the ballot and the messenger who will deliver news from the Franks because certain requirements must be fulfilled in order to become a capital of culture.
| 36 | 3 | "Mrkomir i demon s Čikole" | 8 December 2023 |
| 37 | 4 | "Nema mira za Mrkomira" | 15 December 2023 |
| 38 | 5 | "Mrkomir i super kmet" | 22 December 2023 |
| 39 | 6 | "Mrkomir i Anušino kemijanje" | 29 December 2023 |
| 40 | 7 | "Mrkomir i dangubica iz Kambelovca" | 5 January 2024 |
| 41 | 8 | "Mrkomir i prodaja grijeha" | 12 January 2024 |
| 42 | 9 | "Mrkomir i kviz" | 19 January 2024 |
| 43 | 10 | "Mrkomir i povratak pogana" | 26 January 2024 |
| 44 | 11 | "Mrkomir se ispričava" | 2 February 2024 |
| 45 | 12 | "Mrkomir i hladni rat" | 1 March 2024 |
| 46 | 13 | "Mrkomir i fatalna ljubav" | 16 February 2024 |
| 47 | 14 | "Mrkomir i doček reprezentacije" | 8 March 2024 |
| 48 | 15 | "Mrkomir i apn krediti" | 15 March 2024 |
| 49 | 16 | "Mrkomir i slobodni zidari" | 5 April 2024 |
| 50 | 17 | "Mrkomir stvara neprijatelje od 872." | 26 April 2024 |
| 51 | 18 | "Mrkomir protiv bande maskiranih osvetnika" | 3 May 2024 |
| 52 | 19 | "Mrkomir i komedija" | 10 May 2024 |
| 53 | 20 | "Mrkomir i poticaji za povratak u domovinu" | 17 May 2024 |

=== Season 4 (2024–25) ===
| No. overall | No. in season | Title | Original release date |
|---|---|---|---|
| 54 | 1 | "Mrkomir piše povijest" | 2 October 2024 |
| 55 | 2 | "Mrkomir i neradna nedjelja" | 9 October 2024 |
| 56 | 3 | "Mrkomir i medvjed" | 16 October 2024 |
| 57 | 4 | "Mrkomir i inflacija" | 23 October 2024 |
| 58 | 5 | "Mrkomir u vodi do grla" | 30 October 2024 |
| 59 | 6 | "Mrkomir i umijeće vladanja" | 6 November 2024 |
| 60 | 7 | "Mrkomir i komunizam" | 13 November 2024 |
| 61 | 8 | "Mrkomir i manje zlo" | 20 November 2024 |
| 62 | 9 | "Mrkomir i ukleto blago" | 27 November 2024 |
| 63 | 10 | "Mrkomir i robot" | 4 December 2024 |
| 64 | 11 | "Mrkomir i osnove ekonomije" | 11 December 2024 |
| 65 | 12 | "Mrkomir i legenda o Krivomiru" | 18 December 2024 |
| 66 | 13 | "Mrkomir i dan kneževine" | 22 January 2025 |
| 67 | 14 | "Mrkomir i pjesma Frankovizije" | 29 January 2025 |
| 68 | 15 | "Mrkomir i petak trinaesti" | 5 February 2025 |
| 69 | 16 | "Mrkomir se razvodi" | 12 February 2025 |
| 70 | 17 | "Mrkomir i pučanin Kane" | 19 February 2025 |
| 71 | 18 | "Mrkomirova epidemija popustljivog odgoja" | 26 February 2025 |
| 72 | 19 | "Mrkomir i janjeća prehlada" | 5 March 2025 |
| 73 | 20 | "Mrkomir i gospodarski pojas" | 12 March 2025 |

=== Season 5 (2026) ===
| No. overall | No. in season | Title | Original release date |
|---|---|---|---|
| 74 | 1 | "Mrkomir i pravila lijepog ponašanja" | 17 March 2026 |
Slavomir teaches Mrkomir and Anuša proper manners in hopes of securing a valuable alliance with a foreign prince who plans a visit.
| 75 | 2 | "Mrkomir i nuspojave" | 31 March 2026 (after episode 3) |
| 76 | 3 | "Mrkomir i eutanazija" | 24 March 2026 |
Mrkomir introduces paid sick leave and safety rights for peasants, but when they start injuring themselves and work stops, Slavomir proposes a drastic way to push them back from sick leave.
| 77 | 4 | "Mrkomir i još jedan Mrkomir" | 7 April 2026 |
Slavomir finds a wild man who looks like Mrkomir and trains him to handle his dull duties until he becomes almost indistinguishable from him.
| 78 | 5 | "Mrkomir i ovisnost o energentima" | 14 April 2026 |
| 79 | 6 | "Mrkomir i bojkot" | 21 April 2026 |
Slavomir creates the first mixed‑goods shop that inspires foreign rivals, but his rising taxes make food unaffordable and spark a boycott, which he turns to his advantage.
| 80 | 7 | "Mrkomir i demografska obnova" | 28 April 2026 |
Mrkomir tries to stop the principality’s collapse by taking land from idle nobles and later importing foreign workers through Slavomir, who profits from the deal.
| 81 | 8 | "Mrkomir i ej trgovina" | 5 May 2026 |
Mrkomir tries to buy Anuša a fur coat, discovers delivery‑based trade, starts e‑commerce with Slavomir’s guidance, and Anuša opens her own shop after seeing her dresses being sold.
| 82 | 9 | "Mrkomir i AI-mir" | 19 May 2026 |
AI‑mir arrives at court after Držiha finds him in the woods, and his uncanny language skills and good nature help Mrkomir navigate family quarrels, foreign demands, and angry nobles.
| 83 | 10 | "Mrkomir i elementarna nepogoda" | 26 May 2026 |
Slavomir tries to solve the drought‑driven famine by staging a grand concert by the singer Buzdovan to stir up war fever and lure diaspora crowds.
