= Vjeran Zuppa =

Croatian writer (1940–2023)

- Born: Vjeran Zuppa; 26 January 1940; Split, Yugoslavia (now Croatia)
- Died: 10 October 2023 (aged 83)
- Education: University of Zagreb
- Political party: League of Communists of Croatia (prior to 1990); Social Democratic Party of Croatia (1990); Social Democratic Action of Croatia (1994–1996)
- Awards: Order of Danica Hrvatska

Vjeran Zuppa (26 January 1940 – 10 October 2023) was a Croatian intellectual, dramaturge, literature theorist, poet, translator, and chairman of the Theater ITD.

== Life and career ==
Zuppa graduated from the Faculty of Philosophy in Zagreb. He was editor of some well-known magazines at the time such as: Reason (1961–1967), Telegraph (1969–1971) and Notebook (1972–1975).

Zuppa was the director of the Split Summer Festival and the ITD theatre where he gained most fame. He ran the theatre for 11 years (1966–1977) and provoked the Yugoslav government with critique plays. He was subsequently forced to shut the theatre down. In 1984, he joined the Academy of Dramatic Art, University of Zagreb as a professor and also as a dean from 2000 to 2004.

His most notable works are books from the field of literature critique and theory such as: The New European critique 1-3, Excuse for the songs and Lyric and habit. He also wrote books of songs, which include: Friend Silvester, Life and death of the hunter Luke and De rationes communi. In 1999, he published Notebook, which was a review of the European culture policy and how it should be implemented in Croatia but it never came to a realization.

Zuppa established a "center for dramatic arts," at the institute, called "Open Society" and "The Imaginative Academy". He was introduced in the edition of "2000 outstanding scholars of the 20th century (IBC; Cambridge)," with the explanation, "in honor of an outstanding contribution in the field of dramatology."

Zuppa was also very politically active and gained a reputation as a left-wing intellectual. He was a member of the League of Communists of Croatia and the later reformed Social Democratic Party of Croatia (SDP). He left SDP in the early 1990s due to his opinion that Ivica Račan didn't change the authoritarian system of the party and that it didn't have any realistic social democratic platform. He joined the Social Democratic Action of Croatia in 1994 but left 2 years later after the death of its chairman, Miko Tripalo. He was very critical of the Franjo Tuđman regime during the 1990s which made him stay marginalized from the cultural policy during that time. He expressed his support for Vlado Gotovac at the time but refused to enter his Liberal Party due to ideological differences.

Zuppa later joined the SDP intellectual council in Zagreb, as a non-member. He supported the liberal-left coalition of SDP and HSLS in the Croatian parliamentary election, 2000. After the coalition won, Zuppa tried to become more involved in culture policy but in 2002, he resigned from his theatre council post. After that, he stopped being involved in politics but continued to discuss it.

His notable and only book about the political discussion is Stretched out tongue, which was published by Feral Tribune in 2007.. It contains a political and philosophical discussion with famous columnist Viktor Ivančić and a series of interviews about politics and theater given to various journalists from 1993 to 2005.

Zuppa died on 10 October 2023, at the age of 83.
