= ZeKaeM =

ZeKaeM, abbreviated from Zagreb Youth Theater (Croatian: Zagrebačko kazalište mladih) is a theatre in Zagreb, Croatia formerly run by the Union of Pioneers of Yugoslavia. Since 2014, its director is Snježana Abramović Milković. The theater is also important for its school for children.

== History ==
It was founded on 29 March 1948 as Pioneer Theatre (Croatian: Pionirsko kazalište), whose first director was Božena Begović, daughter of Milan Begović. It goal was to pedagogically develop the creative potential of children through theatre. In 1967, it changed its name to the current one, and in 1977, it became a professional theatre employing young, just graduated actors.

== Reception ==
It is regarded as one of the three most important experimental Zagreb theatres in recent times, alongside Exit Theatre and Teatar &TD. It is considered by some as the cradle of Croatian contemporary theatrical scene due to a large number of actors and authors studying there.
