= Ivan Kušan =

Croatian writer

Ivan Kušan (30 August 1933 – 20 November 2012) was a Croatian writer.

Kušan was born in Sarajevo, Kingdom of Yugoslavia to the family of Jakša Kušan, a bookstore owner. The family moved to Zagreb in 1939. At the age of ten Ivan discovered his writing talent and wrote his first novel.

Later, Kušan discovered a taste for world travel and visual arts. In the 1950s he worked on Radio Zagreb. From 1980 to 1994 he taught at the Drama Arts Academy of University of Zagreb.

He published his first book in 1956. His specialty became children's novels, and some of them, like Lažeš, Melita and Koko u Parizu, became very popular. In the later stages of his writing career, Kušan found a taste for erotic fiction. He also wrote a novel about famous outlaw Jovo Stanisavljević Čaruga, later adapted into 1991 motion picture.

== Personal life ==
Kušan was married twice and had one son from his first marriage. He had several strokes from which he never recovered, which ultimately led to his death in Zagreb, Croatia on 20 November 2012.

== Books by Ivan Kušan ==
Kušan published four short story collections and fifteen novels, but he is best known for his children books. He wrote one short story collection, Strašni kauboj consisting of 30 stories usually 5-10 pages long. Other children books are eight novels. These are in chronological order: Uzbuna na Zelenom Vrhu, Koko i duhovi, Domaća zadaća, Zagonetni dječak, Lažeš, Melita, Koko u Parizu, Ljubav ili smrt and Koko u Kninu. His most famous book is Koko u Parizu. It has been adapted for a theatre play and a film.
