= Miro Gavran =

Croatian writer (born 3 May 1961 in Gornja Trnava)

Miro Gavran (born 3 May 1961 in Gornja Trnava) is a Croatian writer of short stories, fiction and drama. His works have been translated into 44 languages, making him the most translated Croatian writer, and his books have come out in 280 different editions at home and abroad. His dramas and comedies have had more than 450 theatre first nights around the world and have been seen by more than four million theatre attendants.

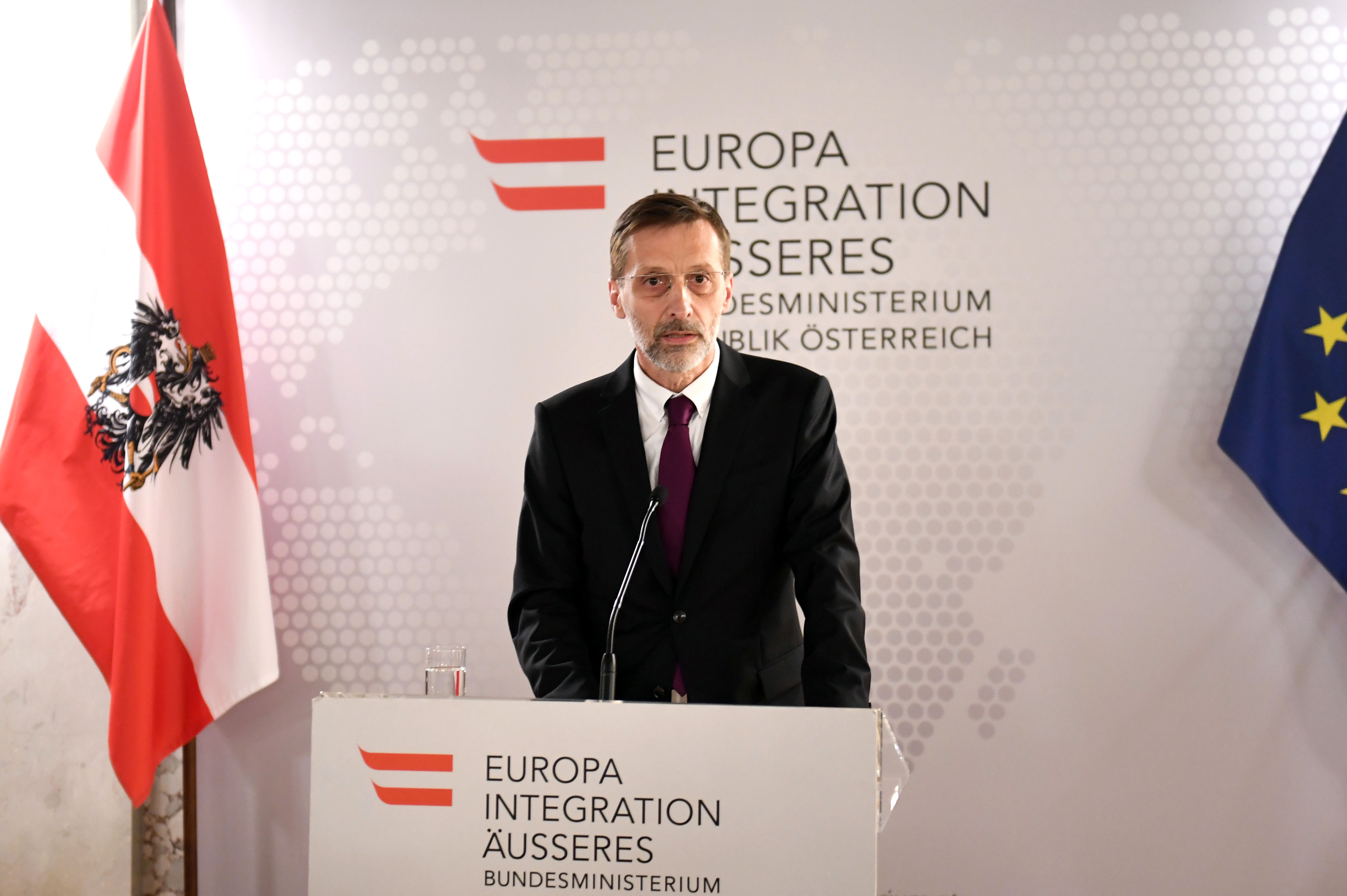
Gavran in 2017 giving a speech

He served as president of Matica hrvatska from 2021 to 2025.

== Early life ==
Gavran was born in Gornja Trnava, PR Croatia, at the time part of Yugoslavia. He completed secondary school in Nova Gradiška in 1980. He then enrolled in the study of dramaturgy at the Academy of Dramatic Art in Zagreb. He graduated in dramaturgy from the Academy of Theatre, Film and Television in Zagreb. He worked as a dramaturge and theatre director at Teatar &TD. He made his debut in 1983 with the play Kreontova Antigona at the Gavella Drama Theatre in Zagreb, in which he addressed the issue of political manipulation.

To date, he has written 57 plays, 11 novels for adults, two short story collections, and ten books for children and young people. Since 1993, he has lived and worked as a professional writer. His dramatic and prose works have been included in numerous anthologies and chrestomathies in Croatia and abroad, and his work is studied at many universities around the world.

He became a full member of the Russian Academy of Literature on 22 April 2014, while in May of the same year he was elected an associate member of the Croatian Academy of Sciences and Arts in Zagreb. In November 2016, he became a member of the Slavic Academy of Literature and Arts, based in Varna, Bulgaria, and on 23 June 2022 he was proclaimed an honorary academician of the Academy of Sciences and Arts of Bosnia and Herzegovina.

Since May 2024, he has been a full member of the Croatian Academy of Sciences and Arts.

== Writing career ==
Gavran made his debut in 1983 with the play Creon's Antigone, in which he spoke out forcefully about political manipulation. In 1986, with the play Night of the Gods, he addressed the relationship between the artist and authority in a totalitarian system. He subsequently wrote a cycle of plays in which male–female relationships became a central theme, and he created a large number of complex female characters; his heroines are at once strong and emotionally nuanced. His plays often feature historical figures and explore ethical and psychological conflicts. To date, he has written 57 plays, including Death of an Actor, All About Women, All About Men, George Washington's Loves, Chekhov Says Good-Bye to Tolstoy, How to Kill the President, Greta Garbo's Secret, Laughing Prohibited, Parallel Worlds, Nora in Our Time, My Wife's Husband, Dr. Freud's Patient, The Doll, Ice Cream, Beer, Your Every Birthday, The Perfect Partner, Coffee at Noon, The Spokesperson, and Agency for Happiness, among others.

He has published eleven novels for adults: Forgotten Son (1989), How We Broke Our Legs (1995), Klara (1997), Margita, or A Journey into a Former Life (1999), Judith (2001), John the Baptist (2002), Pontius Pilate (2004), The Only Witness to Beauty (2009), Kafka's Friend (2011), A Few Birds and One Sky (2016), and Portrait of the Soul (2023). He has also published two short story collections, Small Unusual People (1989) and Stories of Solitude (2019).

In his early prose works, Gavran depicted life in the Croatian provinces, portraying ordinary people – often a kind of anti-heroes – who maintain a positive attitude toward life even when faced with injustice and major hardship. This is particularly evident in the novel Forgotten Son (1989), whose protagonist is a twenty-year-old young man with mild intellectual disabilities. In his forties, Gavran began writing psychological and existential novels inspired by the Bible, in which he brought biblical characters closer to the sensibilities of contemporary readers. As a result, these works have been read with interest by both believers and atheists, who find in them universal human messages.

Gavran's books have been published worldwide. He has received more than 30 literary awards in Croatia and abroad, including the Central European Time Award (Budapest) for overall contribution and the European Circle Award for the promotion of European values in literature.

Gavran has also written ten books for children and young people, including All Sorts of Things in My Head, How Dad Won Mum, Head Over Heels in Love, Happy Days, Farewell Letter, Plays with a Head and a Tail, Try to Forget, Plays for Children, The Teacher of My Dreams, and A Summer to Remember. These books have also found a readership among adult audiences.

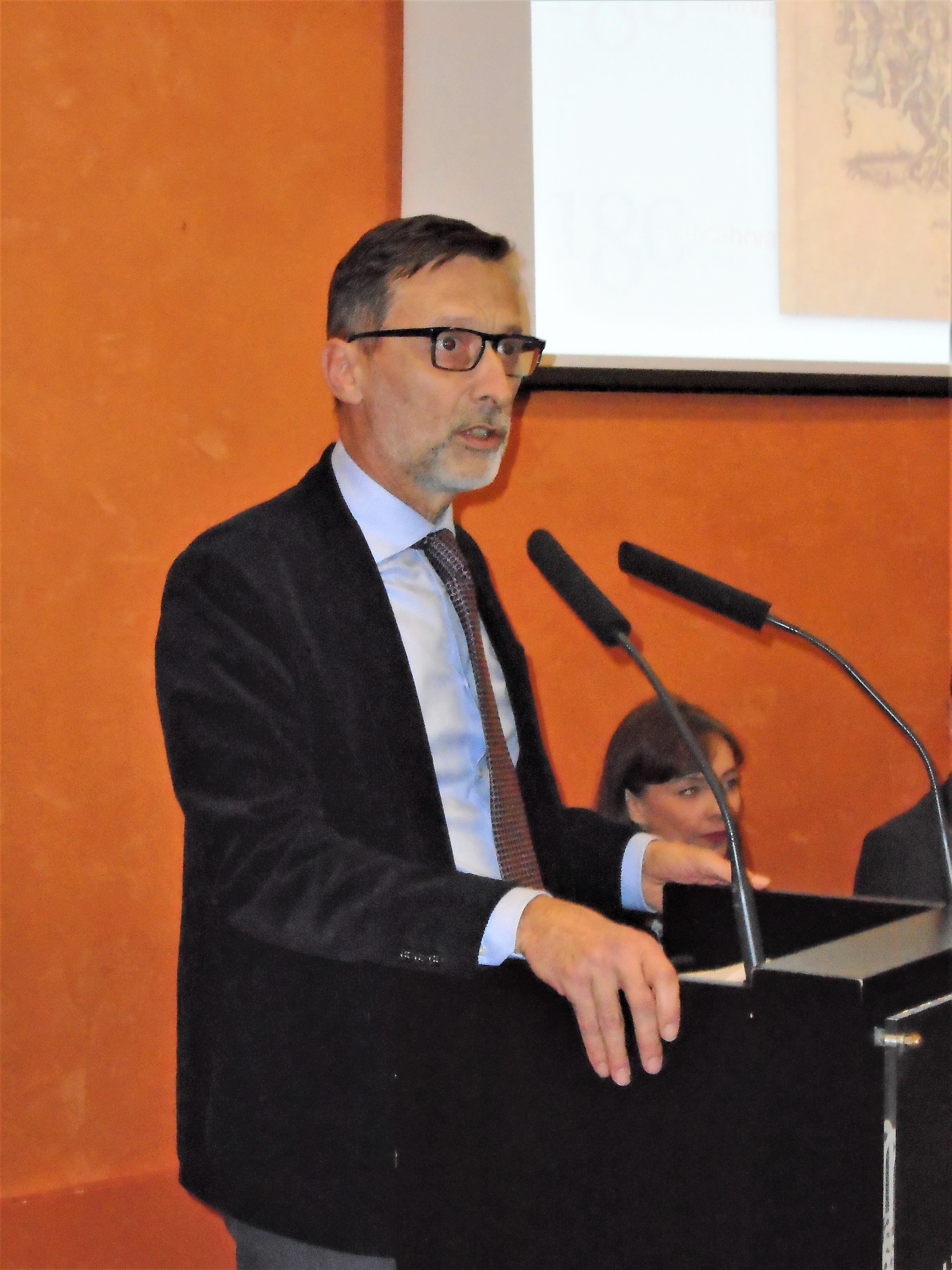
Gavran as president of Matica hrvatska (2022)

== Personal life and awards ==
Gavran earned his degree in dramaturgy at the Academy of Theatre, Film and Television in Zagreb. He first worked as a dramaturge and artistic director at the ITD Theatre in Zagreb (1986 – 1992). Since January 1993, he has been living and working as a freelance, professional writer. His theatre and prose texts have been included in numerous anthologies in Croatia and elsewhere, and his work is sometimes studied at universities.

Since April 2014 Gavran has been a full member of the Russian Academy of Literature and since May 2014 an associate member of the Croatian Academy of Science and Art. In November 2016 he became member of the Slovene Literature and Arts Academy whose residence is Varna in Bulgaria.

Gavran was given the “Dr Alois Mock Europapreis 2017” award in December 2017. The Alois Mock award has been handed since the early 2000s to notable individuals who, in the spirit of the European idea of community, have promoted European values and unity through their literary or journalistic work, activities in the public sector, in organizations or in business. He received the Decoration of Honour in Gold for Services to the Republic of Austria in Austrian Cultural Forum, Zagreb on March 20. It was awarded to him by the president of the Republic of Austria.

He was named the first Tie Ambassador by the Academia Cravatica from Zagreb in September 2018.

He is married to the actress Mladena Gavran, and they founded the GAVRAN Theatre in 2002. Their son Jakov is also an actor.

Gavran has had a festival dedicated solely to his dramas and comedies in five different countries. The festival known as the GavranFest was founded in the city of Trnava in Slovakia in 2003, moved to Kraków in Poland in 2013, from 2016 to 2018 held in Prague in the Czech Republic, in 2019 in Augsburg in Germany, and 2020 Belgrade, Serbia.

== Novels ==
- The Forgotten Son (1989)
- How We Broke Our Legs (1995)
- Klara (1997)
- Margita, or a Journey into a Past Life (1999)
- Judith (2001)
- The Baptist (2002)
- Pontius Pilate (2004)
- The Only Witness of Beauty (2009)
- Kafka’s Friend (2011)
- A Few Birds and One Sky (2016)
- Portrait of a Soul (2023)

== Short story collections ==
- Small Unusual People (1989)
- Stories of Solitude (2019)

== Books for children and young adults ==
- All Sorts of Things in My Head (1991) – Ivana Brlić-Mažuranić Award
- How Dad Won Mom Over (1994)
- Farewell Letter (1994)
- Head Over Heels in Love (1994)
- Happy Days (1994) – Mato Lovrak Award
- Little Plays with a Head and a Tail (1995)
- Try to Forget (1996)
- The Teacher of My Dreams (2006) – Special Award, International Children’s and Young Adult Literature Festival, Sofia
- Plays for Children (2013)
- A Summer to Remember (2015) – Mato Lovrak Award

== Poetry and monologues ==
He also published the poetry collection Poems, the poem The Defence of Jerusalem, and the collection of monologues Theatrical Monologues.

== Theatrical plays ==
- 1983. Creon's Antigone
- 1986. Night of the Gods
- 1988. George Washington's Loves
- 1989. Chekhov Says Good-bye to Tolstoy
- 1990. Royalty and Rogues
- 1991. My Wife's Husband
- 1993. Dr. Freud's Patient
- 1994. Shakespeare and Elizabeth
- 1995. Death of an Actor
- 1997. Forget Hollywood
- 2000. All About Women
- 2003. How to Kill the President
- 2005. Nora in Our Time
- 2006. All About Men
- 2007. Parallel Worlds
- 2008. Greta Garbo's Secret
- 2009. The Craziest Show in the World
- 2011. Couples
- 2012. The Doll
- 2014. Ice Cream
- 2015. Beer
- 2016. The Patients
- 2018. Your Every Birthday
- 2020. The Perfect Partner
