= Amir Bukvić =

Bosnian actor, documentarist, playwright, screenwriter and novelist

- Born: 1951 (age 74–75); Sarajevo, SR BiH, SFRJ
- Notable work: Aristotel u Bagdadu; Zapis o Bosni: literarno-poetski mozaik iz BiH
- Spouse: Hasija (actress)
- Children: Amar Bukvić (actor); Aida Bukvić (theatre and film director)

Amir Bukvić (born 1951 in Sarajevo) is a Bosnian actor, documentarist, playwright, screenwriter and novelist. His works have been awarded the most prestigious literary awards in Bosnia and Herzegovina and Croatia, namely the “Alija Isaković Award” and the Marin Držić Award, and included in anthologies.

== Career ==
Bukvić was born in 1951 in Sarajevo, in modern-day Bosnia and Herzegovina. He went on to graduate in acting at the Academy of Dramatic Arts in Zagreb. He is an actor, documentarist, playwright, screenwriter and novelist, currently living and working in Zagreb, where he became a member of the Croatian National Theater.

Early on in his acting career, his roles in theatre included playing Shakespeare's Hamlet, Trepliov in Chekhov's The Seagull and Gregers in Ibsen's The Wild Duck. Bukvić also established himself as an actor on TV and film in various Yugoslav productions, and his acting engagement included titles such as Kazališni život ili smrt, a TV adaptation from 1981 of eponymous crime story written by Pavao Pavličić, Karmine in 1978, a drama by the Croatian film, theater and television director Ivan Hetrich, Sudite me in 1978, directed by Ivan Hetrich on the script by Nedjeljko Fabri, Prijeđi rijeku ako možeš in 1977, a TV drama directed by Petar Veček written on the basis of true events from life of couple of drug addicts, and in which Bukvić partnered with Mira Furlan in the leading roles.

He is the author of number of plays and novels, and also authored several documentaries for the foreign producers and screenplays for feature films and television. Bukvić's multi-award-winning philosophical novel, which was later made into drama text, Aristotle in Baghdad (Bosnian: Aristotel u Bagdadu), would eventually make its way into theatre as a play directed by his daughter Aida, and premiered in Sarajevo's Kamerni teatar 55, during / International Festival Sarajevo Sarajevo Winter (Bosnian: Internacionalni festival Sarajevo Sarajevska zima) in 2007.

His drama Children of CNN (original in Bosnian: Djeca sa CNN-a) was made into a feature film, which he co-written with his daughter Aida, who also directed it. The film featured at the 28th Sarajevo Film Festival in August 2022.

== Diplomatic and administrative engements ==
In 1994, Bukvić was appointed the cultural attaché at the Embassy of Bosnia and Herzegovina in Zagreb, and the director of the first Cultural Center of Bosnia and Herzegovina in the world, which he opened in Zagreb on the initiative of the representatives of international community in the region and the Bosnian embassy. In 2000, he left diplomacy and returned to the theater and devoted himself to writing plays and scripts for film and television.

== Awards ==
His works have been awarded the most prestigious literary awards in Bosnia and Herzegovina and Croatia, namely the “Alija Isaković Award” and the Marin Držić Award, and included in various anthologies. Bosniak Cultural Community "Renaissance" (or "Revival" / "Rebirth") (Serbo-Croatian: Bošnjačka zajednica kulture "Preporod") published several of his books and awarded him biannual award the “Alija Isaković Award” twice. He also received the Marin Držić Award twice, for the drama Aristotle in Baghdad and for the drama Who Tore Down the Berlin Wall. In 2010, BH Radio 1 awarded him the first prize for the best original radio drama "Novo vrijeme".

== Personal life ==
Amir Bukvić's wife Hasija, who was an actress until her marriage to Amir, with whom he has two children. An oldest, a daughter Aida Bukvić, is a theatre and film director and associate professor at the Academy of Dramatic Arts in Zagreb. His son is an established actor Amar Bukvić.

== Bibliography ==
Some of Bukvić's writings include:

=== Essays ===
- Zapis o Bosni: literarno-poetski mozaik iz BiH [Record of Bosnia: literary and poetic mosaic from Bosnia and Herzegovina]

=== Novels ===
- Odgovor Malog Princa, Zagreb, 2004
- Aristotel u Bagdadu, Zagreb, 2006
- Rastanak, Zagreb, 2011

=== Stories ===
- Ljubavne priče, (collection of stories), 2018

=== Plays ===
- Stanovnici sna, 1981
- Homo novus, 1986
- Drame (Stanovnici sna, Homo Novus, Nepredvidiv slučaj, Dan jednog leptira, Disident), (collection of plays), Sarajevo, 1991
- Šalom u Toledu, 1999
- Svemirsko putovanje malog princa, 2003
- Djeca sa CNN-a, 2005
- Ko je srušio Berlinski zid, 2009

=== Radio drama ===
- Novo vrijeme, Sarajevo, 2010

== See also ==
- Enis Bešlagić
