= Lijevče =

Small geographical region in northern Bosnia and Herzegovina

Coordinates: 44°57′39″N 17°20′49″E

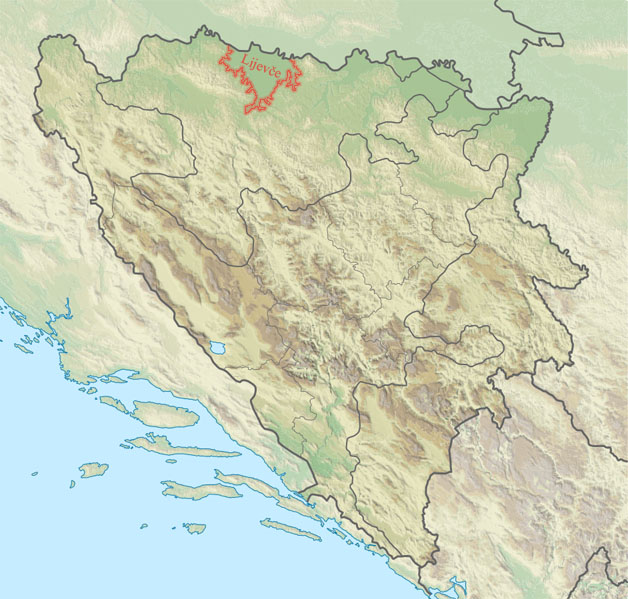
Location map of Lijevče.

Lijevče, also the Lijevče field (Serbo-Croatian: Lijevče polje, Serbian Cyrillic: Лијевче поље), is a small geographical region in northern Bosnia and Herzegovina; a plain situated between the rivers Sava and Vrbas, and Mount Kozara. It includes settlements part of Gradiška, Srbac and Laktaši, in the Banja Luka region of the Republika Srpska entity. It is part of the wider Bosanska Krajina ("Bosnian Frontier") historical region.

== Geography ==
The macro-mountain of the Vrbas river at the mouth of the Sava is called Lijevče polje, and the name refers to the plain which extends from the left bank of Vrbas, downstream from Klašnica, in a length of around 34 kilometres. Towards the north the depression funnel extends and it almost reaches to Gradiška, so that the Sava river is its northern border. It is roughly in the beginning of Vrbas, between Sava in the north, Prosara in the west, Motajica in the east, and Kozara in the southwest. The western border of the plain is determined by contour lines of 120 metres above sea level towards Potzozarje. The total area of the field is about 500 kilometres. The boundaries give the plain a roughly triangular outline.

Crossing over soft alluvial soil, the Vrbas river and its tributaries have changed their courses, creating numerous meanders, backwaters and breaking new beds. In 1943, Vrbas broke a new mouth of the Sava, around 350 metres upstream from the previous one. The part by the Sava is of alluvial-barred character and is partly exposed to the annual floodings of Sava.

The large ponds of Bradač and Jovač are still visible on satellite image. Matura is the old course of the Vrbas, which bed tends to move eastward. The earliest mention of this stream is from 1443, when it was recorded in a charter as „aqua piscatura Mlaterma vocata“.

It is an agricultural region, with highly fertile land.

== Name ==
The name of the valley is derived from the late medieval city of Levač which was located on the territory of modern settlement Laminci Sređani. Spreading of the city name on the plain along the lower course of the Vrbas contributed also to the establishment of the Lefče nahiya (sr. Лефче, Turkish: nahiye Lefçe) in the beginning of Ottoman rule. Here, as in many other cases, the Ottomans took the already existing name. The Levač field ("Lewach campus"), appears in written sources before the Ottoman nahi was established (1540). The first preserved mention of this name, as a synonym to the "field of Vrbas" ("campus Orbaz"), is from a letter of Slavonian magnate Ludovik Pekri, dated May 1537. Pekri reported to Ferdinand II, Archduke of Austria about the Ottomans who had left their horses grazing on "the field of Vrbas". In April 1538, Croatian-Slavonian Ban Petar Keglevich used the name in a Hungarian form transcribed into Latin - ager Lewachmezed (Hungarian: Lewachmező), valley of Levač field (долина Левач поље).

In June of the same year, there was another record of Ottomans leaving their horses „in campo Lewach“. In the end of 1538, Ban Toma Nadazhdi proposed to one of the ban's with cavalry to "campum Levacz invader et omnia Illic Flamma et ferro miscere", while another part of the army would simultaneously attack with ships and infantry and again liberate Bosanska Gradiška from the Ottomans.

== Settlements ==
The region spans over Gradiška in the northwest, Srbac in the northeast, and Laktaši at the southern point of the plain. Its seat is Gradiška. It includes the following settlements:

- Bardača
- Nova Topola
- Mahovljani
- Trošelje
- Kukulje
- Kočićevo
- Laminci Sređani
- Laktaši
- Mašići
- Donji Karajzovci
- Gornji Karajzovci
- Razboj Lijevački/Lijevče
- Rogolji
- Rovine

== History ==
During World War II, the Battle of Lijevče Field was fought between Croatian Ustashe and Serb Chetnik forces in this region.

== Monuments ==
- Cathedral of the Transfiguration of the Lord, Serbian Orthodox Church in Razboj Lijevački, built in the second half of the 20th century.

== See also ==
- FK Lijevče, football club based in Nova Topola

== Sources ==
- "Лијевче". Мала енциклопедија Просвета (Mala enciklopedija Prosveta). Vol. 2. Belgrade: Prosveta. 1978. (in Serbian)
- Srpsko istorijsko-kulturno društvo "Njegoš" u Americi (1961). Glasnik Srpskog istorijsko-kulturnog društva "Njegoš"., Volumes 7-8 (in Serbian). Njegoš.
- Mrgić, Jelena (2007). "Lijevče polje: Some notes on the settlements and environment, 15th-19th century". Istorijski časopis (in Serbian). Belgrade.
