= Misimović =

Misimović (Serbian Cyrillic: Мисимовић) is a Serbian surname. It is traditionally found in Bosnia and Herzegovina (in the Gradiška region), from where the family members have spread into Croatia and Serbia. There were only 3 people with the surname in Croatia in the 1950s, today there are 31, concentrated in Rijeka. Petar Misimović from Podgradci, a Partisan, fell at the Battle of Kozara. At least 46 individuals with the surname, all of whom were ethnic Serbs, from the villages of Jablanica and Sovjak in Gradiška, were murdered by the Ustaše at the Jasenovac concentration camp. At least six of these were children, murdered in 1942. It may refer to:

- Zvjezdan Misimović, Bosnian footballer
