= List of settlements in the Federation of Bosnia and Herzegovina/E =

List of settlements in the Federation of Bosnia and Herzegovina - NJ
Settlement	City or municipality	Canton
Elezagići	Gradiška	Republika Srpska
Eminovo Selo	Tomislavgrad	
