= Lijevča =

Lijevča may refer to:

- Lijevče field in northwestern Bosnia and Herzegovina
- Lijevča, Zavidovići, a village near Zavidovići, Bosnia and Herzegovina
