= Kočićevo =

Kočićevo (Serbian Cyrillic: Кочићево) is a South Slavic toponym, derived from the possessive form of the "Kočić family" - Kočić's.

- Kočićevo, Bačka Topola, in Serbia
- Kočićevo (Gradiška), in Bosnia and Herzegovina

== See also ==
- Petar Kočić (1877–1916), Serbian writer
