= Miljevići =

Miljevići is a toponym that may refer to:

- Miljevići, Istočno Novo Sarajevo, a town in Republika Srpska, Bosnia and Herzegovina
- Miljevići, Gradiška, a town in Bosnia and Herzegovina
- Miljevići, Prijepolje, a town in Serbia
- Miljevići, Zavidovići, a town in Zavidovići, Bosnia and Herzegovina

== See also ==
- Miljević, a village in the municipality of Golubac, Serbia
