= Church of St. Nicholas, Romanovci =

Church of St. Nicholas
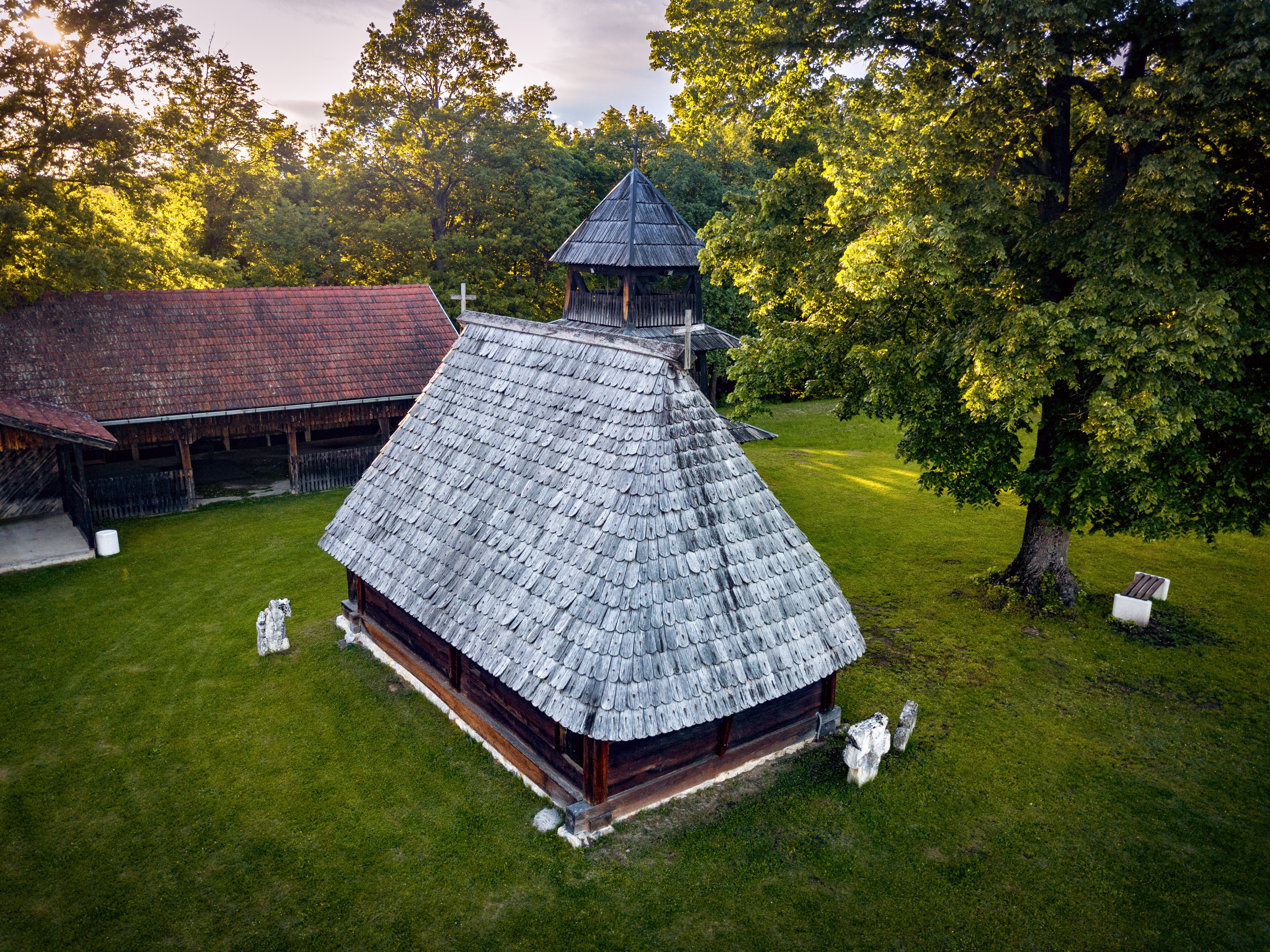
- Church of St. Nicholas
- 44°58′4″N 17°15′58″E
- Denomination: Serbian Orthodox

Church of St. Nicholas (Serbian: Црква брвнара у Романовцима) is a temple of the Serbian Orthodox Church located in Romanovci in the municipality of Gradiška, Republika Srpska. It belongs to the Eparchy of Banja Luka. It is dedicated to Saint Nicholas of Myra.

It is a national monument of Bosnia and Herzegovina.
