= 28 Jun =

Serbian-Canadian humanitarian organization and UN consultant

28. Jun
- Сама Србија себе спасила
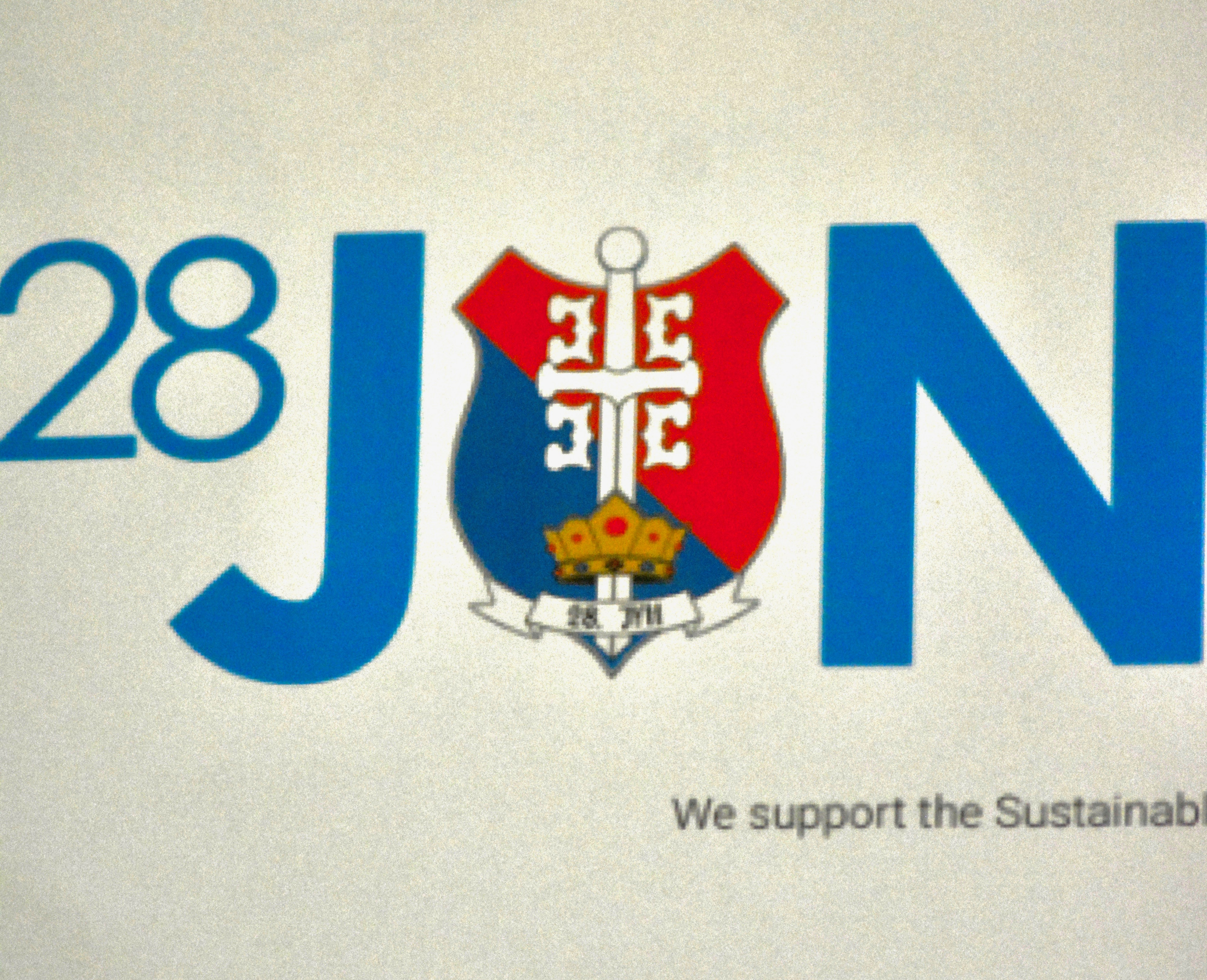
- Named after: Vidovdan (St. Vitus day); 1389 Battle of Kosovo
- Formation: 2011; 15 years ago
- Founder: Filip Filipi Janković
- Founded at: Victoria, Canada
- Type: Non-governmental organization
- Legal status: Active Consultant with ECOSOC
- Professional title: 28 Jun (NGO)
- Headquarters: Victoria, Canada
- Locations: Belgrade, Serbia; Melbourne, Australia
- Region served: Former Yugoslavia (Western Balkans)
- Products: Food; Financial relief; Clothing; Housing construction; Medical supplies; Medical equipment; Academic Scholarships
- Services: Delivery of food, supplies, clothing; Advocacy for displaced families and orphaned children; Advocacy for victims of sexual assault and domestic violence.; Advocacy for the Serbian minority of Kosovo & Metohija; United Nations consulting on socioeconomic issues of the Western Balkans or former Yugoslavia
- Methods: Hand delivery of goods by a network of over 500 members
- Members: United Nations (2018)
- Official language: Serbian, English
- President: Filip Filipi Janković
- Board of directors: Snežana Dimitrijević; (VP): Jovana Malbašić; (Director of Operations): Tijana Ivković; (28.Jun Global Manager)
- Key people: L.P. Corbett; (Treasurer)
- Subsidiaries: 28 Jun Global; 28 Jun Women; 28 Jun Aid; Serbs for Good
- Affiliations: Arke Trust; Serbian Rights
- Disbursements: $12.7M (estimated)
- Website: 28jun.org

28. Jun is a humanitarian organization with special United Nations consultative status aimed at improving the lives of those living in the Western Balkans post the dissolution of the Socialist Federal Republic of Yugoslavia. It was established by Serbian Canadian artist Filip Filipi in 2011 and is the only humanitarian organization operating in the Western Balkans to be recognized by the United Nations. 28. Jun is a member of the Forbes's nonprofit council. As of 2025, over US$12.7 million in aid has been delivered to the Western Balkans.

The organization was established as a way for the diaspora to engage in relief efforts along with social and economic issues still present as a result of years of bitter conflict and decline which struck the south Slavic republic of Yugoslavia in the late 1980s— primarily active in Serbia (including Kosovo), Bosnia & Herzegovina (Including RS Bosnia entity), Montenegro and parts of Croatia.

A 4-year long initiative to deliver humanitarian and medical supplies was made possible by a generous donation from the Israeli advocacy organization StandWithUs:

StandWithUs and the Israeli people assisted 28. Jun and the Serbian people in a crucial time by helping us complete this massive humanitarian project. We will continue to work together closely in the future as we make the progression to cultural and economic exchanges.

— Filip Filipi Janković, Founder and President of 28.Jun, —StandWithUs

In an exclusive interview for Frontal, the Vice President for 28. Jun talks about the struggles of the diaspora and how she found her calling working to eradicate child poverty.

It is only when a man stands on his own foot in a foreign world and finds a place under this alien sun, does he awaken even more sorrow and pain when he remembers his brothers, sisters, relatives, friends he left when he left for another country. At that moment, "June 28" came into my life and completely changed it from the roots. Then I realized that humanitarian work might be the only way for us Serbs to help from abroad. Just because we went and left the homeland does not give us the right to give up.

— Snežana Dimitrijević, Vice President of 28.Jun

On July 11, 2022 OK! magazine featured some of Serbia's humanitarian giants present in popular culture:

Our shared belief— that those of us fortunate enough to be able to help, have the obligation to do so— is what propelled us for 10 years. When we heard about the mining tragedy, we knew it was on us to step up. Within a few hours we launched the fundraising campaign and a month later we donated 10 million Serbian dinars to the families of the deceased and the surviving miners. Being able to bring them at least some comfort during that time was an incredible feeling

— Filip Filipi, Founder and President of 28.Jun

== Disaster relief ==
During the 2014 Southeastern Europe floods, 28. Jun airlifted 30,000 lbs of urgent humanitarian relief into Belgrade from Toronto. It was the largest airborne donation Serbia received by a non-state actor during the natural disaster. 28. Jun was a first responder to the earthquake in Banovina (region).

=== Sokobanja Mine Campaign ===
40 days after the tragedy, the International Humanitarian Organization paid a donation of 8.8 million Serbian Dinara (US$102,500) to the families of miners who lost their lives during the collapse of the Sokobanja mine. The total cash donation to the families was later increased to $137,000

== Jasenovac Memorial Temple ==
28.Jun partnered with the Gvozden family to initiate the raising of funds for a project that would communicate to both local and wider communities the significance of honoring forgotten martyrs of the Jasenovac Extermination System.

3.5m RS Dinara was raised for the construction of a temple dedicated to the victims of Jasenovac in Medjuvodje, Kozarska Dubica, in order to preserve the memory of the martyrdom of Serbs in Jasenovac and other places, said Snežana Dimitrijević.

When we sat down to conceive an idea of how we wanted to represent the memorial, we eventually settled on the idea of a memorial temple. We wanted the memorial to represent the eternal remembrance and the sacredness in which we, their descendants, hold them

— Snezana Dimitrijević, Vice President of 28. Jun

Dimitrijević pointed out the importance of building this temple in Potkozarje, which suffered a lot in the Second World War, when the largest number of children, women, the elderly and infirm from Kozara, Knešpolje and many other areas, after the offensive on Kozara was carried out through Međuvođe, and then killed and executed in the Jasenovac camp.

== Medical ==
In December 2019, anesthesia machines, portable X-ray units, ultrasound machines, EKG/ECG machines, and several tons of medical supplies, was delivered to the General Hospital in Prokuplje, Serbia. The donation, sent in partnership with American NGO Supplies Over Seas, is one of the largest ever of its kind to the country, slightly surpassing the value of a shipment 28. Jun delivered to Niš, Serbia, in 2013.

== Domestic violence and advocacy ==
In October 2020, 28. Jun Women was launched to combat current issues of domestic violence and trafficking in the region. The NGO strives to provide direct assistance and resources to women's shelters and single mothers while promoting positive role models to mentor young women in their life and career goals.

== Special projects ==
=== Christmas gift distribution ===
Every year gifts are distributed to children of all ages throughout Serbia, Kosovo & Metohija, Dalmatia and Bosnia. 3,000 gifts along with winter supplies and equipment for homes were delivered to 20 cities including Bosansko Grahovo, Sarajevo, Niš, Kraljevo, Banja Luka and Dubica–where the construction of the Jasenovac Memorial Temple project is making haste.

=== Animal food vending and recycling machine ===
The organization was the first of its kind in the region to address the issue stray animal starvation when a special project commenced in late 2021 which saw the inaugural installation of two vending machines in the Stari Grad district of Belgrade, the first of many to be installed. The machines dispense food and water for domestic canine and feline animals which have fallen into homelessness which is estimated at 15,000 in a city of only 2 million inhabitants. In addition to dispensing provisions, the vending machines, similar in appearance to an ATM, also allow for the disposing of plastic bottles; a feature to promote environmentally-conscious choices and the push towards sustainable development. Most recently, installing locations in Bosnia began— the first being Banja Luka.

=== Community share refrigerators ===
The first of its kind, the refrigerator in Belgrade was installed by Tamara Stojković and Emilija Bojić as part of the eponymous youth initiative launched by the WWF project. Donated by 28.Jun, it is intended to reduce food waste and help those facing starvation. The community share refrigerator is located in front of Dorćal Platz in Belgrade. Other installations will be located throughout Bosnia and Serbia.

=== Scholarships ===
The Serbian diaspora organization awards scholarships to college level and pre-collegiate students to assist in the cost of supplies and books.

=== Serbian language and culture education ===
In less than a month after the May 2022 announcement of ambitions to open the first school outside of Vukovar, the ceremonial opening in was attended by the Deputy Prime Minister of Croatia, Anja Šimpraga. The project was led by Snežana Dimitrijević and Sava Vojnović and a total US$150,000 was donated by 28. Jun.

Children from Djevrska will learn Serbian language and Cyrillic, history along with everything related to the culture and tradition of the Serbian people.

== Response to Corona Virus SARS 2 (COVID-19) ==
- Delivered over 100,000 protective equipment items including N95 respirator masks, gowns, gloves and eye-protective goggles worth nearly $1 million to help curb the pandemic in Serbia.
- Translated and distributed the leading manual for COVID-19 prevention and treatment to 200,000 medical personnel throughout the Western Balkans within days of its publication.
- Provided over $10,000 in financial assistance for children in Serbia and Bosnia.
- Provided 3 pallets of emergency food and supplies to orphanages, geriatric care facilities and women's shelters throughout Serbia.
- Created a data center for Serbs stuck abroad due to COVID-19 and shared our information with embassies around the world while providing emergency medicine and accommodation.

== United Nations consulting ==
The organization was officially granted special consultative status on June 28, 2018, by the United Nations Economic and Social Council (ECOSOC), which consists of 19 member states, during a session of the Council in New York. Out of the estimated 10 million non-profit organizations only 4,500 of them have reached this level and this status. ECOSOC is the UN's main platform for addressing global economic, social and other related issues. The selection of 28 Jun is a recognition for the long-term humanitarian work in the former Yugoslavia. Granting this status enabled the organization to express expert opinion regarding the Western Balkans on important social and economic issues of the United Nations.

May 2022 saw the return of the 28. Jun United Nations delegation in Geneva— speaking at a total of 24 seasons over the course of a week. 28.Jun's Jovana Malbašić (BiH) delivered remarks including the environmental report prepared in the wake of the Rio Tinto controversy and marking the successful conclusion of the disaster relief campaign for the families of the victims during Sokobanja mine collapse that abruptly happened soon after Rio Tinto lost the contract to exploit Serbia's lithium resource.

== Activism ==
=== NYC Council Fascism Scandal ===
28.Jun and its subsidiary "Serbian Rights" sent a formal request for an apology on behalf of the outraged Serbian community of New York City after the NYC Council promoted fascism with a 'greater Albania' flag for an event celebrating Albanian colonization and ethnic cleansing of serbs in the pseudo-country of Kosovo. The NYC Council refused.

Representatives, in light of your recent celebrations, we invite you to reconsider the inappropriate presence of the neo-fascist flag of so-called Greater Albania. We call on the City of New York to immediately remove the post and issue an official apology for the use of the inappropriate symbol. The flag of Greater Albania, which celebrates Nazism and fascism, does not suit a multi-ethnic metropolis like New York. We urge Council members to be better informed about the current situation and to educate themselves about history when attending future events.

— Serbian Times, "Skandal U Njujorku: Zastava zloglasne Velike Albanije promovisana u Gradskoj skupštini, Srbi traže izvinjenje, prete demonstracijama!"

=== Rio Tinto Scandal ===
In May 2022, 28. Jun reported on the deteriorating environmental situation and possible humanitarian crisis in Serbia regarding the "Jadar" illegal mining project by Rio Tinto, promising to use its special consultative status with the United Nations.

In a statement provided by 28.Jun, executive level members urged that "among the many problems in Serbia related to the environment, we are most concerned about Rio Tinto Jadar lithium mine". A strong narrative has developed which argues that the European Union has designated Serbia and the region as the toxic dumping ground for the EU. Leaders of the clandestine mining giant Rio Tinto told the EU officials that the construction of the mine will begin after the elections in Serbia.

== Celebrity Endorsements ==
Over the years, the organization has been endorsed and directly supported by athletes, entertainers, entrepreneurs and other notable personalities.

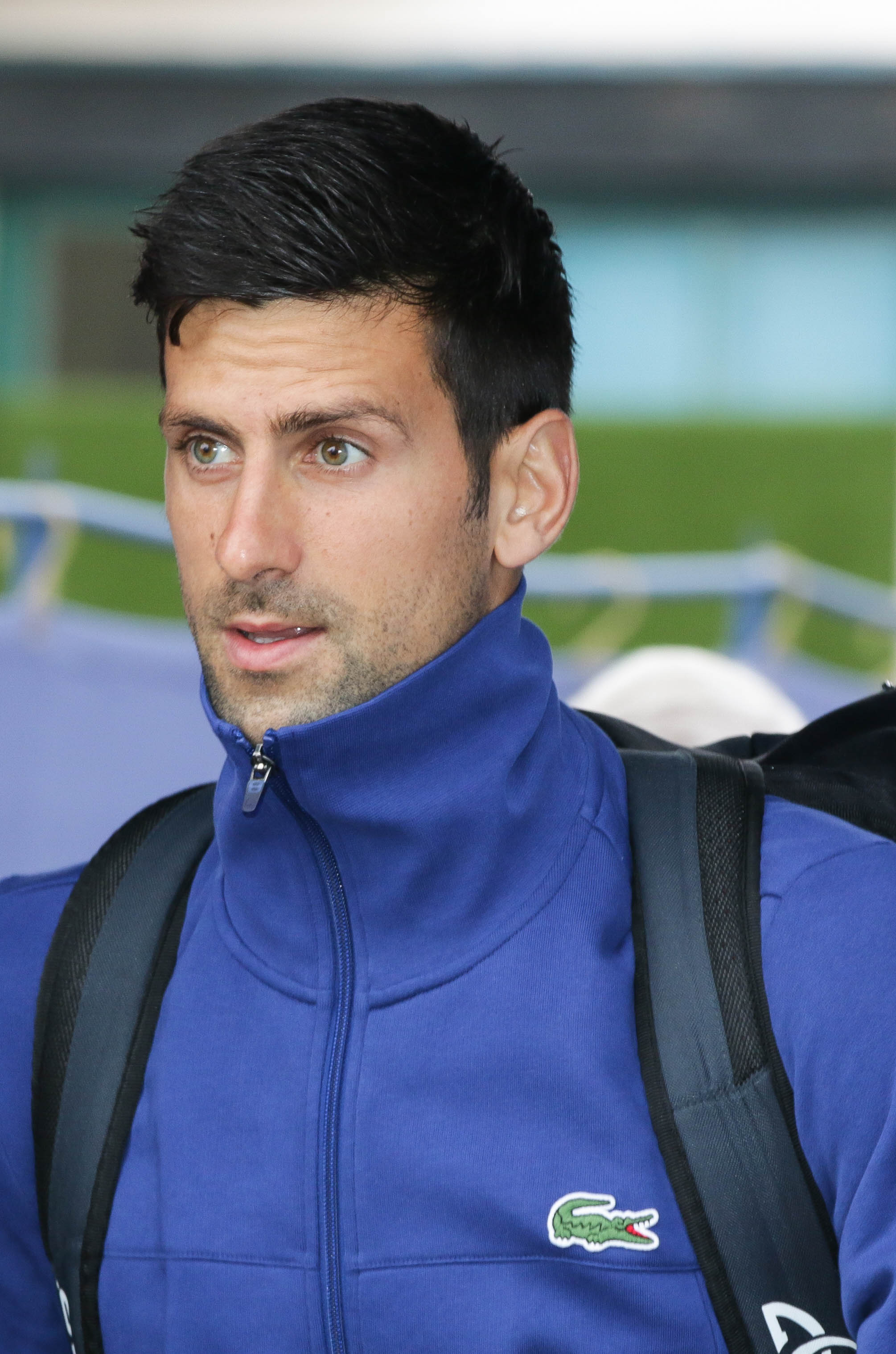
During the 'Soko 8' campaign, the organization presented Novak Djoković with the "Humanitarian of the Decade" award.

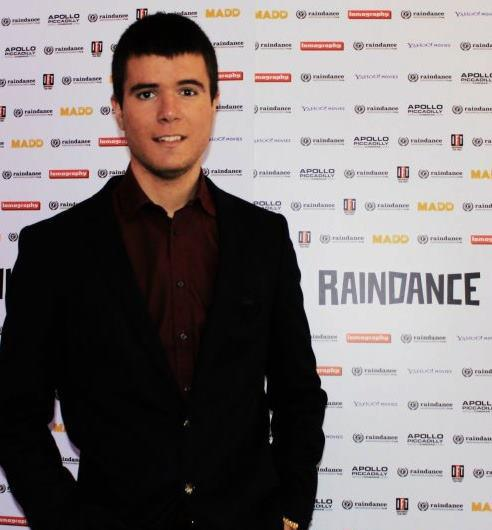
Boris Malagurski

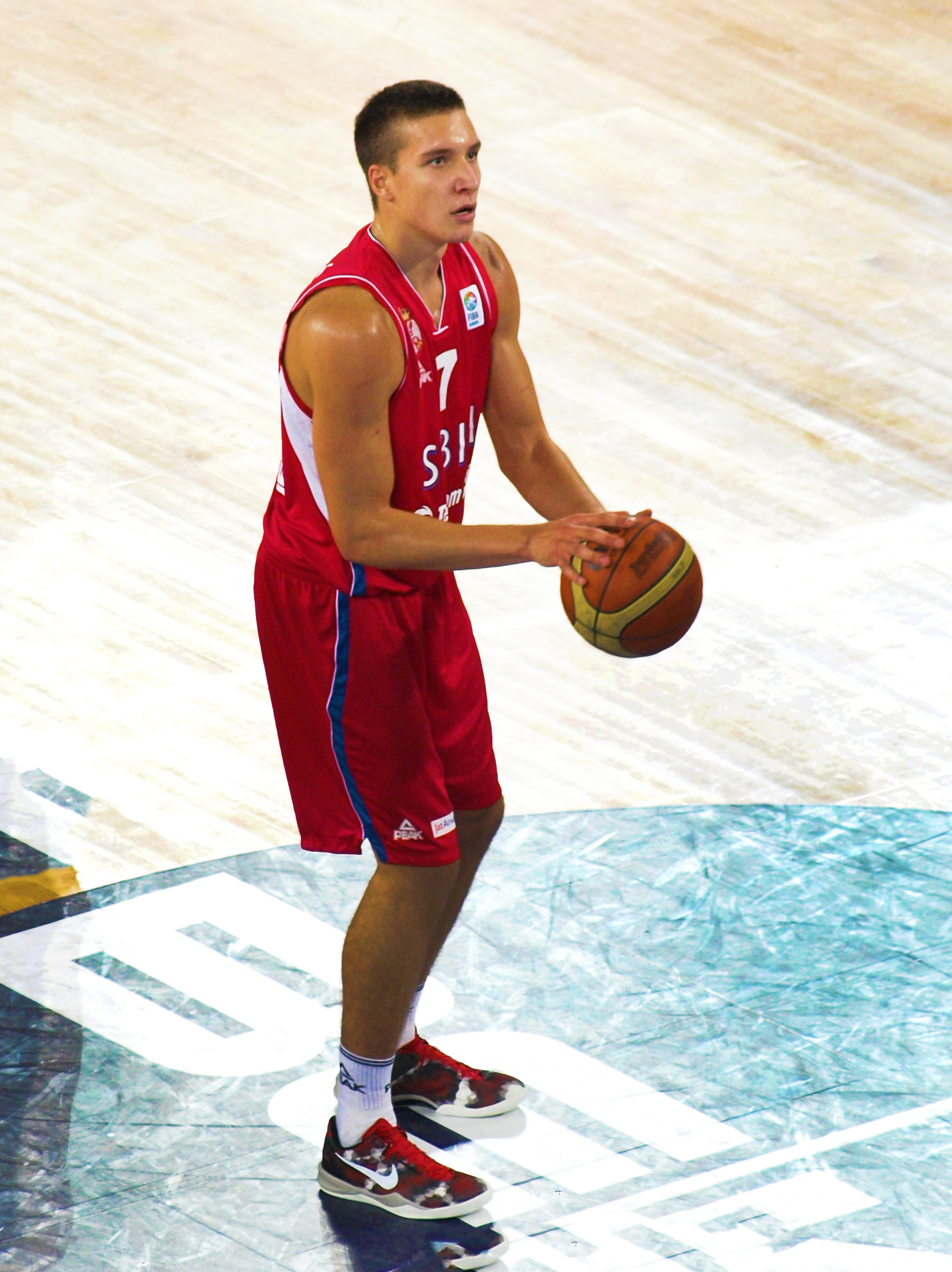
Bogdan Bogdanović

Professional Athletes
Novak Djoković 2022 Humanitarian of the decade
Jelena Janković
Luka Jović
Bodgan Bogdanović
Milan Lučić
Entertainment
Gordon Bijelonić
John Bosnitch (journalist)
Filip Filipi (singer)
Danica Karić
Emir Kusturica (film director)
Andrija Kuzmanović (actor)
Boris Malagurski (film director)
Sofija Milošević
DJ Smitty (Post Malone) 2018 Humanitarian of the year
Mihajlo Veruović (singer)2024 Humanitarian of the year
Technology
Richard Branson
Nikola Aničić
Mihajlo Bjelić
