= Liskovac =

Liskovac may refer to:

- Liskovac (Cazin), village in Bosnia and Herzegovina
- Liskovac (Gradiška), village in Bosnia and Herzegovina
- Liškovac, mountain in Serbia
