= Pašalić =

Pašalić (Serbo-Croatian pronunciation: [paʃǎliːtɕ]) is a Bosnian and Croatian surname. It originated from the Ottoman Turkish title "Pasha," title equivalent to the British title Lord, granted by the Sultan denoting a descendant or son of a high-ranking Ottoman official. The Slavic suffix "-ić" (son of), indicating a "son of a Pasha”. It is a relatively rare surname that originated in Western Bosnia, old documents mention this surname as one of the most notable branches of Badanjković-Badnjević aristocratic family from Western Bosnia. Notable people with the surname include:

- Arif Pašalić (1943–1998), Bosnian military officer
- Drago Pašalić (born 1984), Croatian basketball player
- Ivić Pašalić (born 1960), Croatian politician
- Marco Pašalić (born 2000), German-born Croatian footballer
- Mario Pašalić (born 1995), Croatian footballer
- Muhamed Pašalić (born 1987), Bosnian basketballer
- Tatjana Pašalić (born 1984), Croatian presenter
