= Mačkovac (Gradiška) =

Coordinates: 45.1664°N 17.3017°E

- Village
- Interactive map of Mačkovac
- Country: Bosnia and Herzegovina
- Municipality: Gradiška
- Time zone: UTC+1 (CET)
  - Summer (DST): UTC+2 (CEST)

Mačkovac (Serbian Cyrillic: Мачковац) is a village in the municipality of Gradiška, Bosnia and Herzegovina.
