= Jazovac =

- Village
- Location within Bosnia and Herzegovina
- Coordinates: 45°01′10″N 17°12′22″E
- Country: Bosnia and Herzegovina
- Entity: Republika Srpska
- Municipality: Gradiška
- Time zone: UTC+1 (CET)
  - Summer (DST): UTC+2 (CEST)

Jazovac (Serbian: Јазовац) is a village in the municipality of Gradiška, Republika Srpska, Bosnia and Herzegovina.
