= Dubrave, Gradiška =

Dubrave Дубраве
- Village
- Location within Bosnia and Herzegovina
- Coordinates: 45°5′57″N 17°17′2″E
- Country: Bosnia and Herzegovina
- Entity: Republika Srpska
- Municipality: Gradiška
- Time zone: UTC+1 (CET)
  - Summer (DST): UTC+2 (CEST)

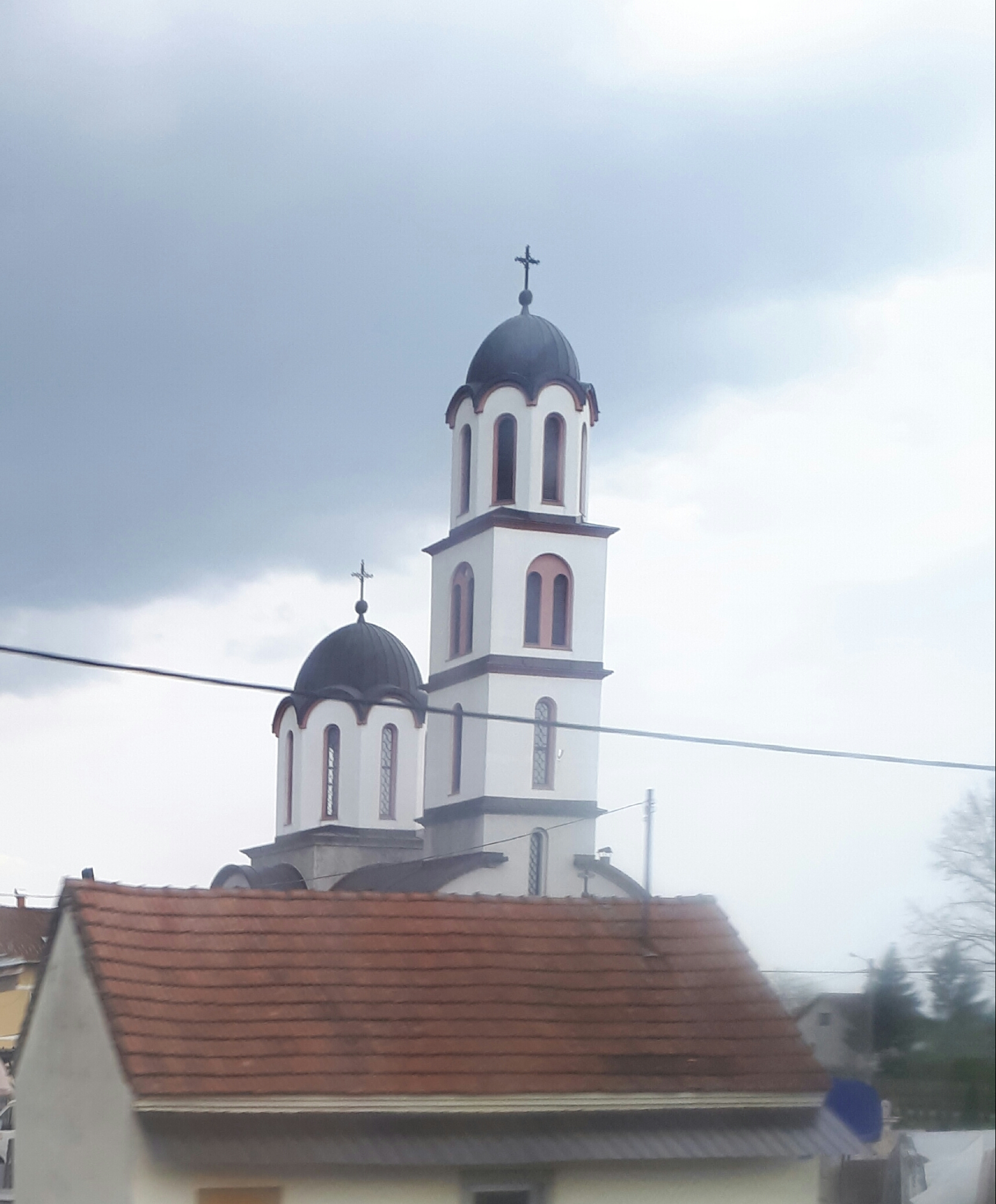
The Serbian Orthodox Church of St. Apostle Peter and Paul in the village of Dubrave, municipality of Gradiška, Republika Srpska, Bosnia and Herzegovina.

Dubrave (Serbian Cyrillic: Дубраве) is a village in the municipality of Gradiška, Republika Srpska, Bosnia and Herzegovina.
