= Mokrice, Bosnia and Herzegovina =

Mokrice Мокрице
- Village
- Location within Bosnia and Herzegovina
- Coordinates: 45°06′N 17°15′E
- Country: Bosnia and Herzegovina
- Entity: Republika Srpska
- Municipality: Gradiška

Population (1991)
  - Total: 26
- Time zone: UTC+1 (CET)
  - Summer (DST): UTC+2 (CEST)

Mokrice (Serbian: Мокрице) is a village in the municipality of Gradiška, Republika Srpska, Bosnia and Herzegovina.
