= Nazif Hajdarović =

Bosnian-Herzegovinian footballer (born 1984)

Personal information
- Date of birth: 22 September 1984 (age 42)
- Place of birth: Bosanska Gradiška, SFR Yugoslavia
- Height: 1.90 m (6 ft 3 in)
- Position: Forward

Youth career
- 1991–1995: TuS Lappentascherhof
- 1995–2004: SV Reiskirchen

Senior career*
Years	Team	Apps	(Gls)
2004–2006	1. FC Saarbrücken II	48	(35)
2005–2009	1. FC Saarbrücken	73	(38)
2009–2011	Bayern Munich II	43	(6)
2011–2012	Hessen Kassel	18	(7)
2012	Borussia Neunkirchen	10	(5)
2012–2013	FK Pirmasens	24	(8)
2013–2014	Borussia Neunkirchen	33	(9)
2014	FC Wiltz 71	3	(0)
2015	FC Erding	7	(2)
2015–2016	SG Ballweiler-Wecklingen	11	(6)
2016–2017	Rielasingen-Arlen	6	(0)
2017–2018	FC Ismaning	10	(3)
2018	Phönix München	6	(1)
2018–2019	SC Fürstenfeldbruck	9	(0)
- * Club domestic league appearances and goals

Nazif Hajdarović (born 22 September 1984) is a Bosnian-Herzegovinian former professional footballer who played as a forward.

== Career ==
Hajdarović began his career with TuS Lappentasch Hof before joining SV Reiskirchen in 1995. In summer 2004, he left SV Reiskirchen and signed with 1. FC Saarbrücken, where he made his professional debut a year later, in a 3–1 defeat against Energie Cottbus in the 2. Bundesliga. He stayed with Saarbrücken through two relegations and the introduction of the new 3. Liga saw them drop to the fifth tier Oberliga Südwest, and helped them to begin their climb up the league, as they were Südwest champions in 2009.

He left 1. FC Saarbrücken on 30 June 2009 to join Bayern Munich II, signing a two-year contract. In his first season, he found opportunities limited, due in part to quotas of homegrown players placed on reserve teams – Hajdarovic found himself overlooked in favour of other senior players, such as Christian Saba and Danny Schwarz. Nonetheless, he managed a respectable return of four goals in thirteen appearances. The following season he made 30 appearances, mostly as a substitute, scoring twice, as the team were relegated from the 3. Liga. He signed for Hessen Kassel at the end of the season, but was released by the club in January 2012, at which point he returned to Saarland to sign for Borussia Neunkirchen. Six months later he moved again, to FK Pirmasens, where he spent one season before returning to Neunkirchen.
