= Berek (Gradiška) =

Berek Берек
- Village
- Location within Bosnia and Herzegovina
- Coordinates: 45.04462°N 17.23927°E
- Country: Bosnia and Herzegovina
- Entity: Republika Srpska
- Municipality: Gradiška
- Time zone: UTC+1 (CET)
  - Summer (DST): UTC+2 (CEST)

Berek is a village in the municipality of Gradiška, Republika Srpska, Bosnia and Herzegovina.
