= Lužani, Gradiška =

Lužani Лужани
- Village
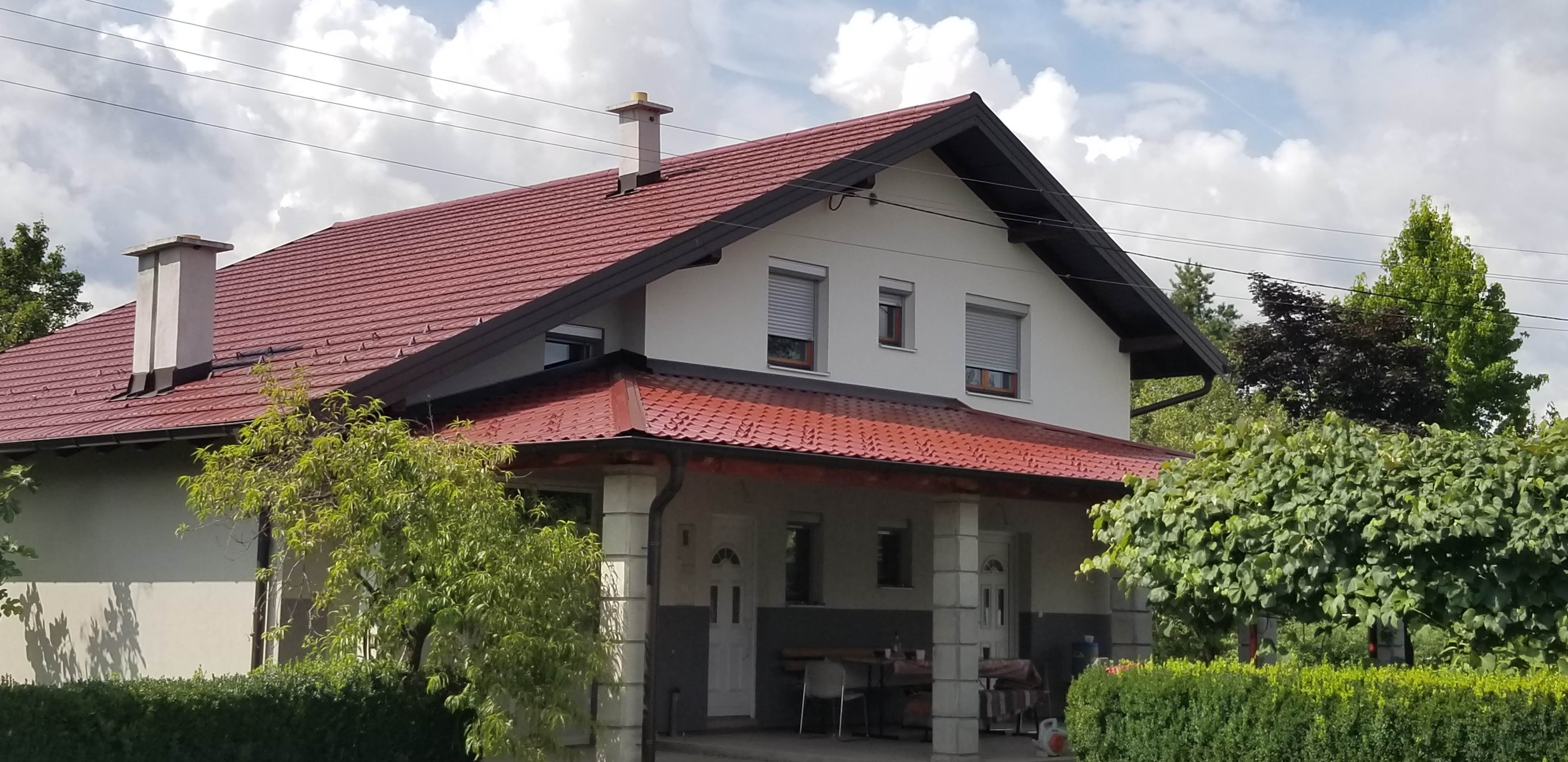
- House in Luzani 2019

- Location within Bosnia and Herzegovina
- Coordinates: 45°05′31″N 17°11′18″E
- Country: Bosnia and Herzegovina
- Entity: Republika Srpska
- Municipality: Gradiška
- Time zone: UTC+1 (CET)
  - Summer (DST): UTC+2 (CEST)

Lužani is a village in the municipality of Gradiška, Republika Srpska, Bosnia and Herzegovina.
