= Trošelji =

- Village
- Location within Bosnia and Herzegovina
- Coordinates: 45°03′49″N 17°21′12″E
- Country: Bosnia and Herzegovina
- Entity: Republika Srpska
- Municipality: Gradiška
- Time zone: UTC+1 (CET)
  - Summer (DST): UTC+2 (CEST)

Trošelji (Serbian: Трошељи) is a village in the municipality of Gradiška, Republika Srpska, Bosnia and Herzegovina.
