= Orahova, Gradiška =

Coordinates: 45.1961°N 17.0258°E

Orahova
- Village
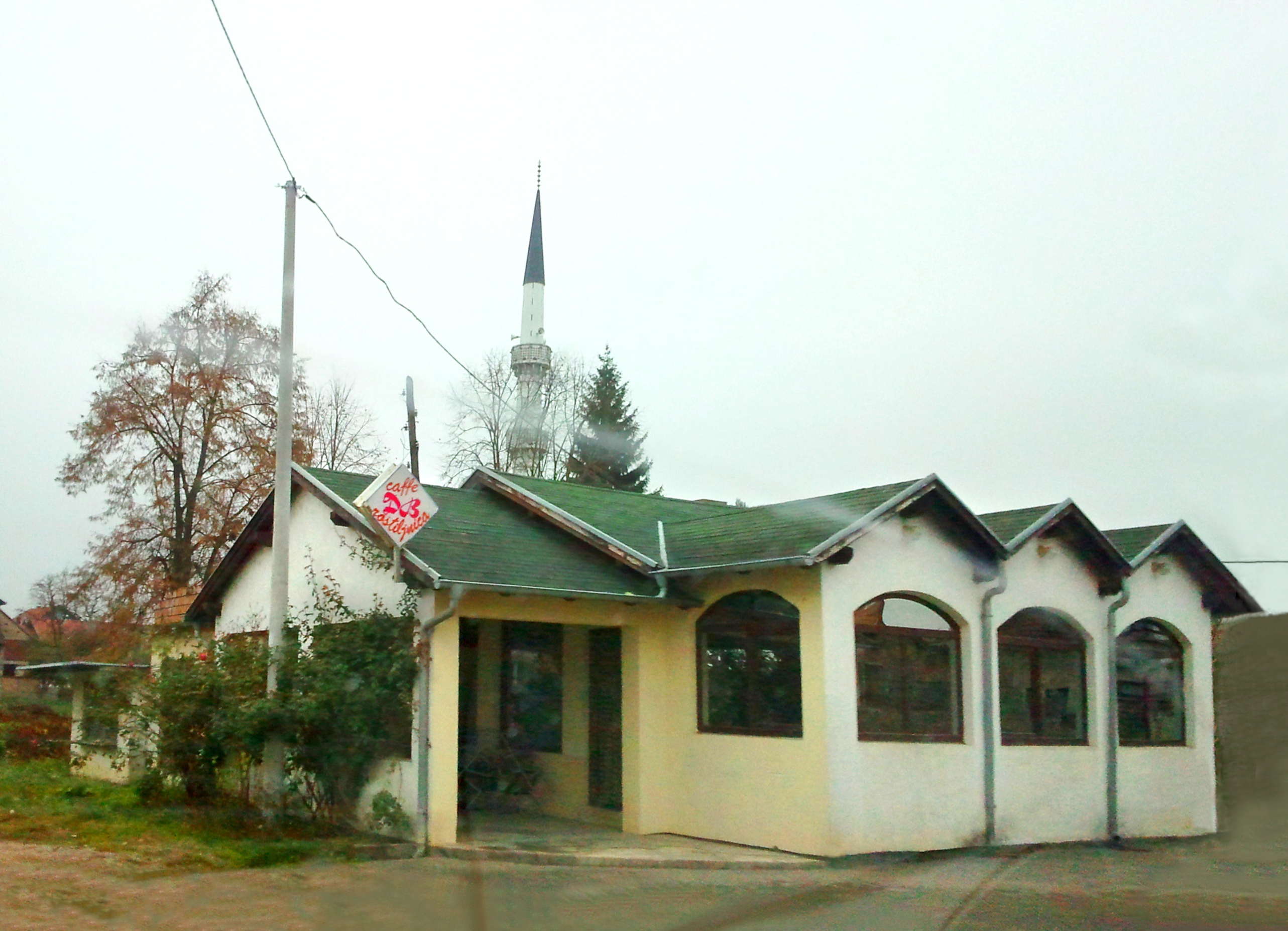
- Street of Orahova
- Interactive map of Orahova
- Country: Bosnia and Herzegovina
- Municipality: Gradiška

Government
- Time zone: UTC+1 (CET)
  - Summer (DST): UTC+2 (CEST)

Orahova is a village in the municipality of Gradiška, Bosnia and Herzegovina.
