= Gornja Jurkovica =

- Village
- Location within Bosnia and Herzegovina
- Coordinates: 44°57′N 17°10′E
- Country: Bosnia and Herzegovina
- Entity: Republika Srpska
- Municipality: Gradiška
- Time zone: UTC+1 (CET)
  - Summer (DST): UTC+2 (CEST)

Gornja Jurkovica (Serbian: Горња Јурковица) is a village in the municipality of Gradiška, Republika Srpska, Bosnia and Herzegovina.
