= Novo Selo, Gradiška =

Novo Selo Ново Село
- Village
- Location within Bosnia and Herzegovina
- Coordinates: 45°7′26″N 17°22′19″E
- Country: Bosnia and Herzegovina
- Entity: Republika Srpska
- Municipality: Gradiška
- Time zone: UTC+1 (CET)
  - Summer (DST): UTC+2 (CEST)

Novo Selo (Serbian Cyrillic: Ново Село) is a village in the municipality of Gradiška, Republika Srpska, Bosnia and Herzegovina. The etymology of the village comes from Slavic languages meaning new village, Novo Selo.
