= Seferovci =

Seferovci Сеферовци
- Village
- Location within Bosnia and Herzegovina
- Coordinates: 45°04′N 17°44′E
- Country: Bosnia and Herzegovina
- Municipality: Gradiška
- Time zone: UTC+1 (CET)
  - Summer (DST): UTC+2 (CEST)

Seferovci is a village in the municipality of Gradiška, Bosnia and Herzegovina.
