= Kijevci, Gradiška =

Kijevci Кијевци
- Village
- Location within Bosnia and Herzegovina
- Coordinates: 45°5′20″N 17°9′59″E
- Country: Bosnia and Herzegovina
- Entity: Republika Srpska
- Municipality: Gradiška
- Time zone: UTC+1 (CET)
  - Summer (DST): UTC+2 (CEST)

Kijevci (Serbian Cyrillic: Кијевци) is a village in the municipality of Gradiška, Republika Srpska, Bosnia and Herzegovina.
