= Adžići =

Adžići Аџићи
- Village
- Location within Bosnia and Herzegovina
- Coordinates: 45°00′01″N 17°07′48″E
- Country: Bosnia and Herzegovina
- Entity: Republika Srpska
- Municipality: Gradiška
- Time zone: UTC+1 (CET)
  - Summer (DST): UTC+2 (CEST)

Adžići (Serbian Cyrillic: Аџићи) is a village in the municipality of Gradiška, Republika Srpska, Bosnia and Herzegovina.
