= Brestovčina =

- Suburban settlement
- Location within Bosnia and Herzegovina
- Coordinates: 45°07′43″N 17°16′31″E
- Country: Bosnia and Herzegovina
- Entity: Republika Srpska
- Municipality: Gradiška
- Time zone: UTC+1 (CET)
  - Summer (DST): UTC+2 (CEST)

Brestovčina (Serbian: Брестовчина) is a suburban settlement in the municipality of Gradiška, Republika Srpska, Bosnia and Herzegovina.
