= Cerovljani =

- Village
- Location within Bosnia and Herzegovina
- Coordinates: 45°02′37″N 17°12′44″E
- Country: Bosnia and Herzegovina
- Entity: Republika Srpska
- Municipality: Gradiška
- Time zone: UTC+1 (CET)
  - Summer (DST): UTC+2 (CEST)

Cerovljani (Serbian: Церовљани) is a village in the municipality of Gradiška, Republika Srpska, Bosnia and Herzegovina. There is a significant Ukrainian minority in the village, with many Ukrainians settling in Cerovljani. There is even a Ukrainian Greek Catholic Church in the village.
