= Greda (Gradiška) =

Coordinates: 45°08′17″N 17°19′45″E

- Village
- Interactive map of Greda
- Country: Bosnia and Herzegovina
- Municipality: Gradiška
- Time zone: UTC+1 (CET)
  - Summer (DST): UTC+2 (CEST)

Greda is a village in the municipality of Gradiška, Bosnia and Herzegovina.
