= Čikule =

- Village
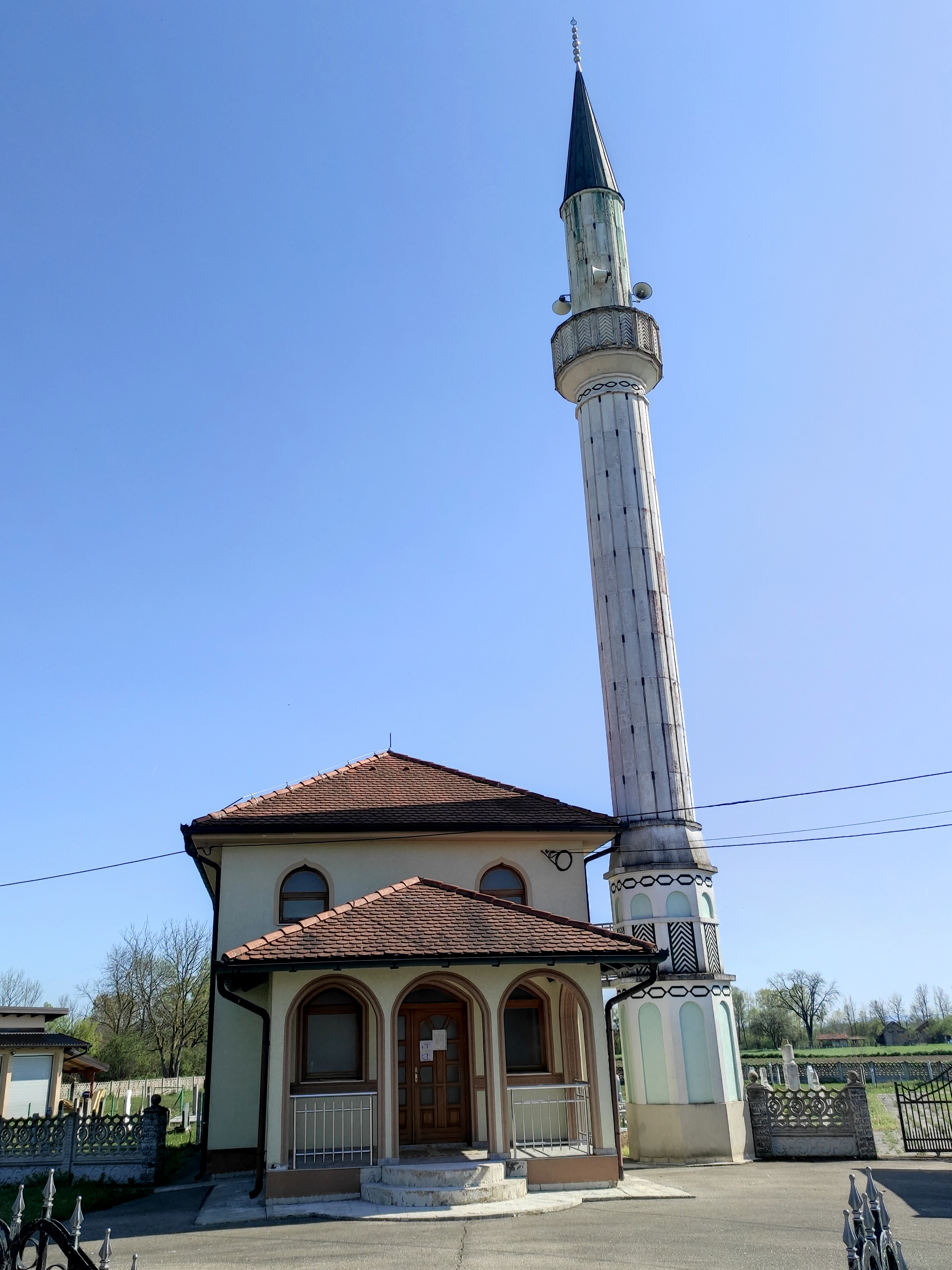
- Mosque in Čikule, Gradiška

- Location within Bosnia and Herzegovina
- Coordinates: 45°06′N 17°16′E
- Country: Bosnia and Herzegovina
- Entity: Republika Srpska
- Municipality: Gradiška
- Time zone: UTC+1 (CET)
  - Summer (DST): UTC+2 (CEST)

Čikule (Serbian: Чикуле) is a village in the municipality of Gradiška, Republika Srpska, Bosnia and Herzegovina.
