= Vakuf (Gradiška) =

Vakuf Вакуф
- Village
- Location within Bosnia and Herzegovina
- Coordinates: 44°59′39″N 17°21′17″E
- Country: Bosnia and Herzegovina
- Entity: Republika Srpska
- Municipality: Gradiška
- Time zone: UTC+1 (CET)
  - Summer (DST): UTC+2 (CEST)

Vakuf (Serbian Cyrillic: Вакуф) is a village in the municipality of Gradiška, Republika Srpska, Bosnia and Herzegovina.
