= Miodrag Latinović =

Bosnian-Herzegovinian footballer

Personal information
- Full name: Miodrag Latinović
- Date of birth: 29 August 1970 (age 56)
- Place of birth: Bosanska Gradiška, SFR Yugoslavia
- Height: 1.87 m (6 ft 1 1/2 in)
- Position: Central defender

Senior career*
Years	Team	Apps	(Gls)
1992–1993	Borac Banja Luka		
- Mačva Šabac
1997	Loznica		
1998–1999	Spartak Subotica	17	(1)
1999–2000	FC Gütersloh	11	(0)
2000–2004	Eintracht Trier	114	(6)
2004–2005	SC Paderborn 07	8	(0)
2005–2006	Eintracht Trier	28	(1)
2008–2009	VfL Trier/Mariahof		
- * Club domestic league appearances and goals

Miodrag Latinović (born August 29, 1970) is a Bosnian-Herzegovinian retired football defender.

== Club career ==
Born in Bosanska Gradiška, SR Bosnia and Herzegovina, after beginning his career with FK Borac Banja Luka, in the early 1990s he moved to Serbia where he played initially with FK Mačva Šabac, and afterwards, in the First League of FR Yugoslavia, with FK Loznica and FK Spartak Subotica. In the late 1990s, he moved to Germany where he played with FC Gütersloh, SV Eintracht Trier 05 and SC Paderborn 07, mostly in the 2. Fussball Bundesliga.
