= Laminci Jaružani =

- Village
- Location within Bosnia and Herzegovina
- Coordinates: 45°06′22″N 17°21′18″E
- Country: Bosnia and Herzegovina
- Entity: Republika Srpska
- Municipality: Gradiška

Population
  - Total: 394
- Time zone: UTC+1 (CET)
  - Summer (DST): UTC+2 (CEST)

Laminci Jaružani (Serbian: Ламинци Јаружани) is a village in the municipality of Gradiška, Republika Srpska, Bosnia and Herzegovina.
