= Dragelji =

Dragelji (Predograd) Predograd
- Village
- Location within Bosnia and Herzegovina
- Coordinates: 45°04′N 17°09′E
- Country: Bosnia and Herzegovina
- Entity: Republika Srpska
- Municipality: Gradiška
- Established: 1390

Population 109
  - Total: 109
- Time zone: UTC+1 (CET)
  - Summer (DST): UTC+2 (CEST)

Dragelji (Serbian Cyrillic: Драгељи) is a village in the municipality of Gradiška, Republika Srpska, Bosnia and Herzegovina.
