= Ćelinovac =

- Village
- Location within Bosnia and Herzegovina
- Coordinates: 45°02′N 17°11′E
- Country: Bosnia and Herzegovina
- Entity: Republika Srpska
- Municipality: Gradiška
- Time zone: UTC+1 (CET)
  - Summer (DST): UTC+2 (CEST)

Ćelinovac (Serbian: Ћелиновац) is a village in the municipality of Gradiška, Republika Srpska, Bosnia and Herzegovina. It is the only village in Bosnia to be inhabited by Poles.
