= Bistrica, Gradiška =

Bistrica Бистрица
- Village
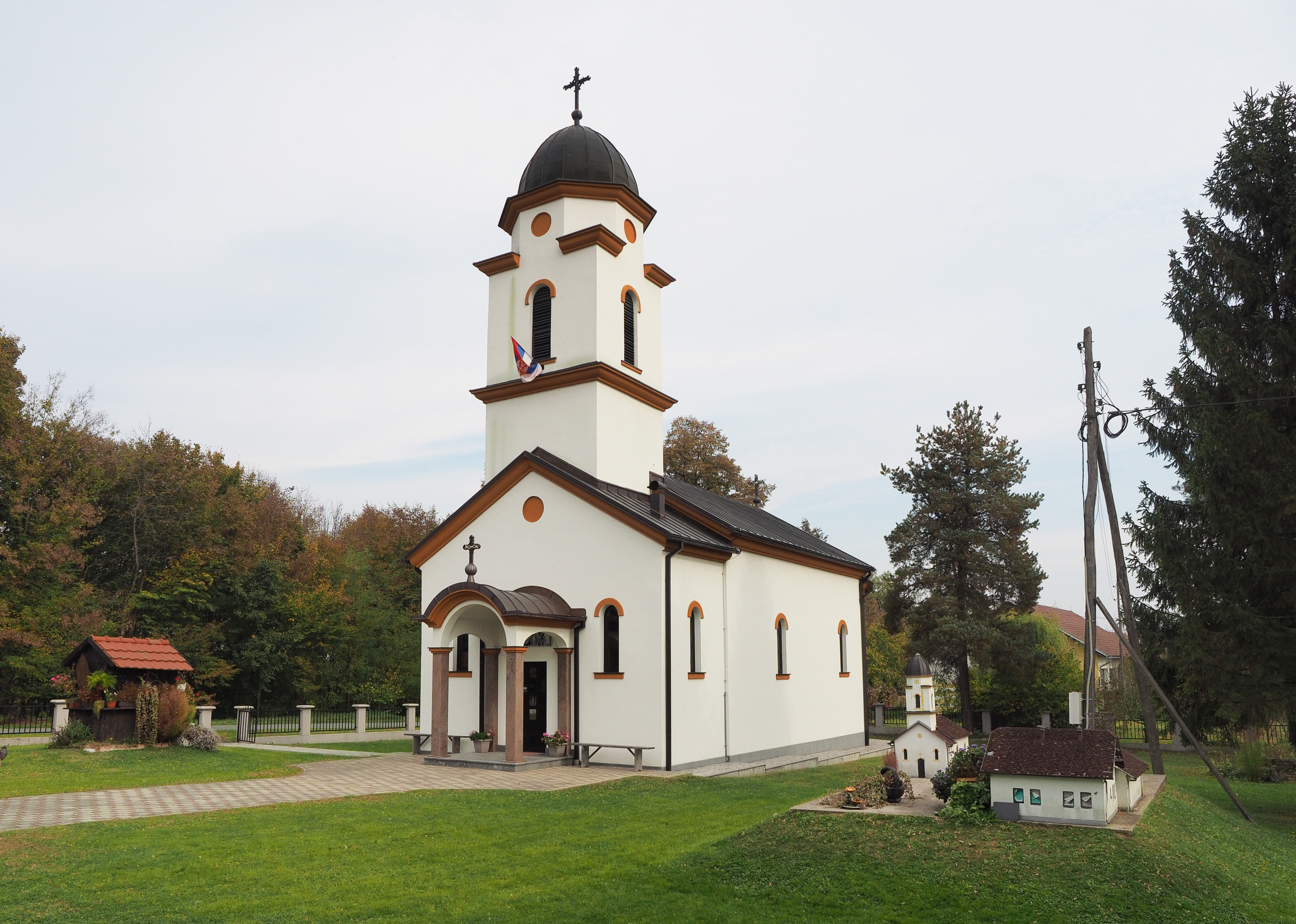
- Serbian Orthodox church of Dormition of the Mother of God

- Location within Bosnia and Herzegovina
- Coordinates: 45°8′14″N 17°8′42″E
- Country: Bosnia and Herzegovina
- Entity: Republika Srpska
- Municipality: Gradiška
- Time zone: UTC+1 (CET)
  - Summer (DST): UTC+2 (CEST)

Bistrica (Serbian Cyrillic: Бистрица) is a village in the municipality of Gradiška, Republika Srpska, Bosnia and Herzegovina.
