= Laminci Sređani =

- Village
- Location within Bosnia and Herzegovina
- Coordinates: 45°06′09″N 17°20′21″E
- Country: Bosnia and Herzegovina
- Entity: Republika Srpska
- Municipality: Gradiška
- Time zone: UTC+1 (CET)
  - Summer (DST): UTC+2 (CEST)

Laminci Sređani (Serbian: Ламинци Сређани) is a village in the municipality of Gradiška, Republika Srpska, Bosnia and Herzegovina.
