= Tatjana Pašalić =

Croatian poker presenter

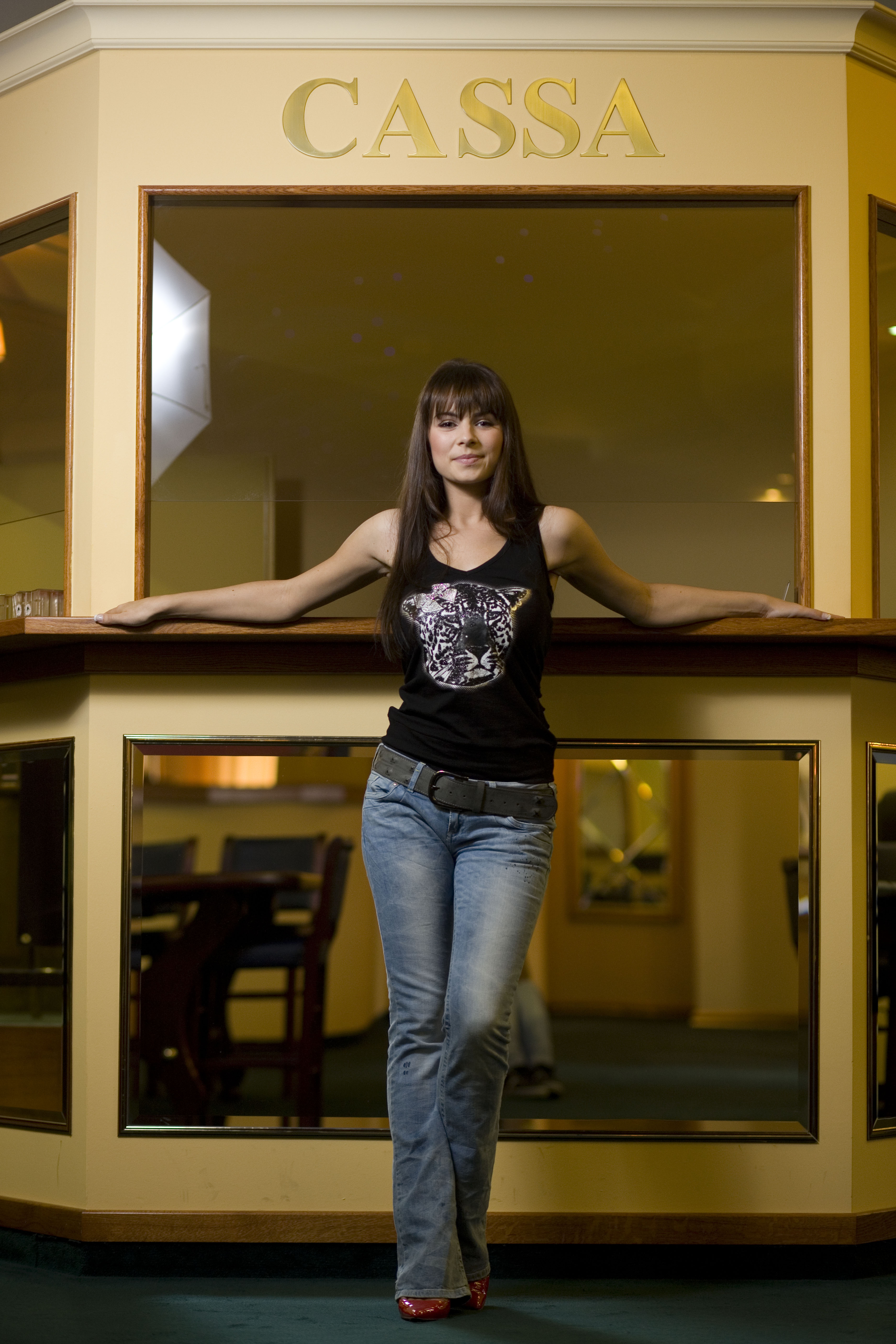
- Pašalić in 2009
- Nicknames: Tasha; Tattytats
- Born: December 28, 1984 (age 41); Bosanska Gradiška, Bosnia and Herzegovina, Yugoslavia

Tatjana Pasalic (pronounced [tatjana]; born 28 December 1984) is a Croatian poker presenter.

== Biography ==
Born in Bosanska Gradiška, Bosnia and Herzegovina, one of the six former republics of Yugoslavia but lived in Zagreb, Croatia since 2 months after her birth. At the age of 19 she moved to Denmark, and started getting interested in online poker and has been in the industry ever since. After living in Malta for work purposes, she moved to Edinburgh, Scotland.

After years of living abroad and collecting information about poker, Pašalić started a poker boom in her country by educating mainstream public about poker.

Pašalić is a passionate cook and has been a part of several cooking shows in Croatia. In February 2009 she won a cooking competition held in Zagreb taking part in a show called Večera za 5.

In 2013, she moved to London, United Kingdom, where she worked as a TV presenter for SKY TV's poker channel.

== Blogging ==
After working as a Country Manager for a poker company, Pasalic made her blogging debut at a tournament in Monte Carlo, following the action in English. Later that year, she blogged from Malta Poker Tour and World Series of Poker. After noticing that a poker community is forming in the ex-Yugoslavia region, she resigned her job and started working as a freelance blogger clashing her own forum with a Serbo-Bosnian community website Pokernika.com making her the first ever Croatian poker journalist.

She invested all of her savings into traveling to follow the European Poker Tour, WSOP and local events to bring news, interviews and updates straight from the poker tables to her readers and efforts resulted in thousands of readers.

She has also done poker columns for Playboy and reports for Poker Europa magazine under an alias Carrie Mason. Pasalic is an active blogger on a UK poker website called On The Rail.

In 2011, she appeared on the June 2011 cover of WPT Magazine.

In 2013, she appeared on the August 2013 cover of BLUFF Magazine.

== Presenting ==
In July 2009 Unibet Poker offered her to present the Croatian video blogs for their website. Videos she presented and co-produced with Marko Butrakovic got over 40,000 views and kicked off a poker boom in Croatia resulting with Pasalic being one of the first poker faces of the local community. Her story of a poker personality and a player motivated many young people to follow her steps. Besides poker media, Tatjana was also featured on the cover of KLIK and FHM magazine and voted one of the sexiest poker players in the world.

After covering events in Warsaw and Budapest, Pasalic has announced her future presenting engagement with Unibet in all of their tournaments throughout 2010. In March 2010 she joined Kara Scott, PartyPoker Team Pro, as a presenter during the Women's World Open IV and the fourth season of Party Poker 'Big Game' that airs on UK TV.

In May 2010, Tatjana joined the World Poker Tour Europe team as a vblog host and a part of the social media team in charge of the live coverage. With the start of the summer, she got involved in the East European poker show organized by Full Tilt Poker called Face the Pro taking on the role as a presenter and a producer.

She was also signed on to continue cooperation with Unibet Open for the 2011 season as their front face. She is a regular character on The Micros since April 2011, and joined them as a cameo in February 2011. She joined CalvinAyre.com as a poker reporter in June 2011.

In August 2013, Pasalic became a TV presenter for SKY Poker TV, hosting 5 hour live studio shows and reporting from the SKY POKER TOUR held around the UK.

== Poker ==
In May 2011, Pasalic joined Team Bodog.

Her appearance at the 2011 WSOP, combined with her continuing role as a presenter, placed her first on WPT Magazine's list of the 20 sexiest girls in poker. The accolades continued at the end of the year when WPT Magazine readers named her "Personality of the Year" in their Readers' Choice Awards.

In May 2012, Tatjana renewed her contract with Bodog and CalvinAyre.com as a poker personality and a TV host.

Playing in her second WSOP Main Event, she created a sensation by wearing a catsuit, the result of her losing a bet to her boyfriend, professional poker player McLean Karr.

Pasalic played the WSOP Main Event in 2013, making Day 2 for the third consecutive year.

In July 2013, Tatjana left team Bodog and fully joined the CA.com as a reporter/contributor for the Asian and the European poker market.

In May 2015, Pasalic joined the World Series Of Poker Live Stream team as their sideline reporter.
