= Kočićevo (Gradiška) =

Kočićevo Кочићево
- Village
- Location within Bosnia and Herzegovina
- Coordinates: 45°4′12″N 17°23′24″E
- Country: Bosnia and Herzegovina
- Entity: Republika Srpska
- Municipality: Gradiška
- Time zone: UTC+1 (CET)
  - Summer (DST): UTC+2 (CEST)

Kočićevo (Serbian Cyrillic: Кочићево) is a village in the municipality of Gradiška, Republika Srpska, Bosnia and Herzegovina.
