= Gornji Podgradci =

- Village
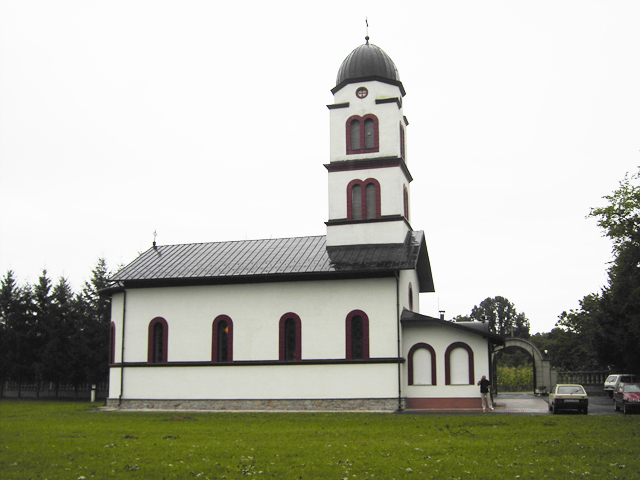
- A Serbian Orthodox church in Gornji Podgradci

- Location within Bosnia and Herzegovina
- Coordinates: 45°03′21″N 17°02′48″E
- Country: Bosnia and Herzegovina
- Entity: Republika Srpska
- Municipality: Gradiška
- Time zone: UTC+1 (CET)
  - Summer (DST): UTC+2 (CEST)

Gornji Podgradci (Serbian: Горњи Подградци) is a village in the municipality of Gradiška, Republika Srpska, Bosnia and Herzegovina.
