= Miljevići, Gradiška =

Miljevići Миљевићи
- Village
- Location within Bosnia and Herzegovina
- Coordinates: 44°57′53″N 17°12′49″E
- Country: Bosnia and Herzegovina
- Entity: Republika Srpska
- Municipality: Gradiška
- Time zone: UTC+1 (CET)
  - Summer (DST): UTC+2 (CEST)

Miljevići (Serbian Cyrillic: Миљевићи) is a village in the municipality of Gradiška, Republika Srpska, Bosnia and Herzegovina.
