= Miljevići, Zavidovići =

Miljevići
- Village
- Location within Bosnia and Herzegovina
- Coordinates: 44.3860951°N 18.3168612°E
- Country: Bosnia and Herzegovina
- Entity: Federation of Bosnia and Herzegovina
- Canton: Zenica-Doboj
- Municipality: Zavidovići

Area
  - Total: 11.36 sq mi (29.42 km^{2})

Population (2013)
  - Total: 109
  - Density: 9.60/sq mi (3.70/km^{2})
- Time zone: UTC+1 (CET)
  - Summer (DST): UTC+2 (CEST)

Miljevići is a village in the municipality of Zavidovići, Bosnia and Herzegovina.

== Demographics ==
According to the 2013 census, its population was 109.

Ethnicity in 2013
Ethnicity	Number	Percentage
Bosniaks	89	81.7%
Serbs	18	16.5%
other/undeclared	2	1.8%
Total	109	100%
