= Rovine, Gradiška =

Rovine Ровине
- Village
- Location within Bosnia and Herzegovina
- Coordinates: 45.0831°N 17.3003°E
- Country: Bosnia and Herzegovina
- Entity: Republika Srpska
- Municipality: Gradiška
- Time zone: UTC+1 (CET)
  - Summer (DST): UTC+2 (CEST)

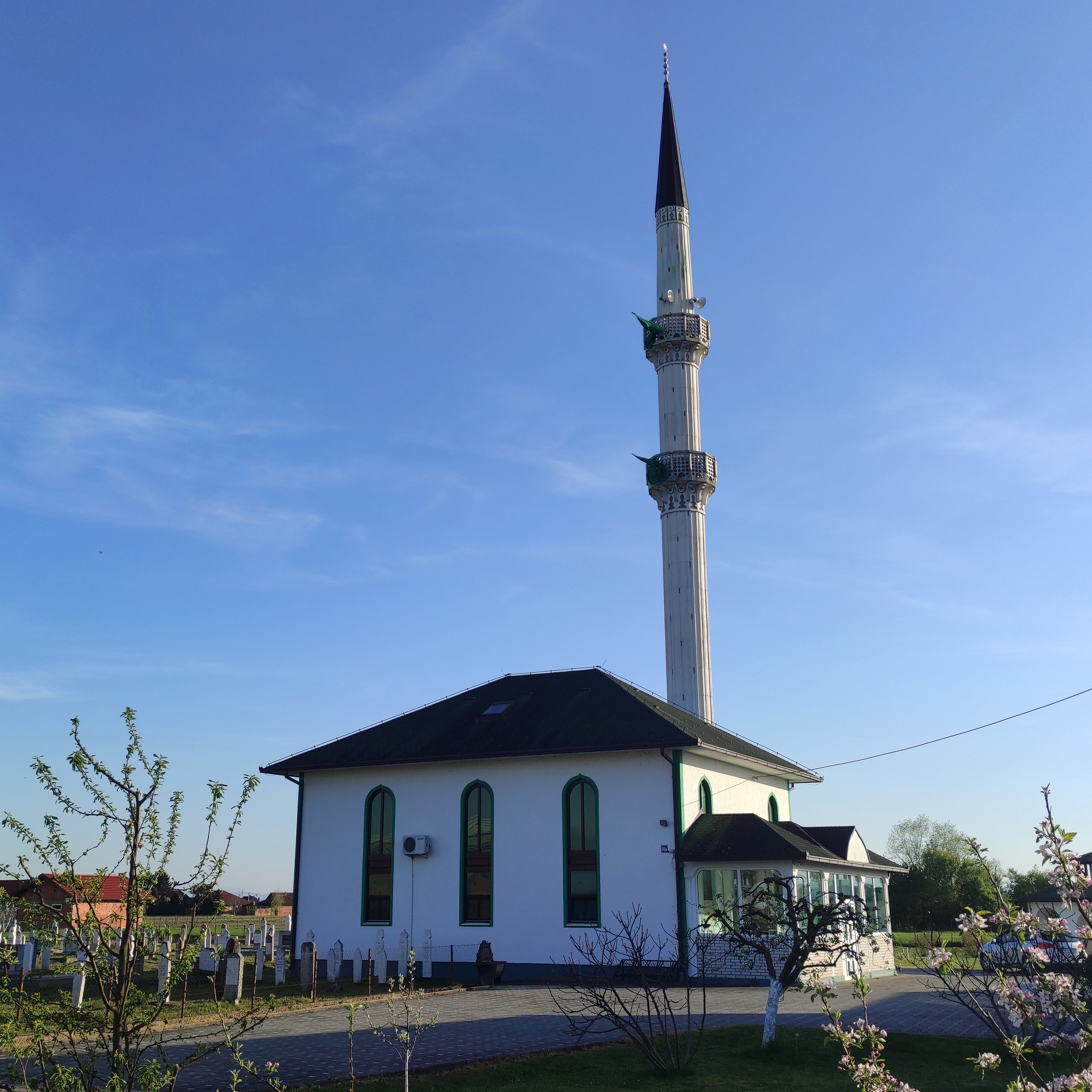
Šibić beg Mosque in Rovine, Gradiška

Rovine (Serbian Cyrillic: Ровине) is a village in the municipality of Gradiška, Republika Srpska, Bosnia and Herzegovina.
