= Rogolji =

Rogolji Рогољи
- Village
- Location within Bosnia and Herzegovina
- Coordinates: 44°26′N 17°03′E
- Country: Bosnia and Herzegovina
- Entity: Republika Srpska
- Municipality: Gradiška
- Time zone: UTC+1 (CET)
  - Summer (DST): UTC+2 (CEST)

Rogolji (Serbian Cyrillic: Рогољи) is a village in the municipality of Gradiška, Republika Srpska, Bosnia and Herzegovina.

== Geography ==
The village is located in the northern part of Bosnia and Herzegovina, near the border with Croatia.

== Demographics ==
According to the 1991 census, Rogolji had 741 residents, of whom: 732 (98.8%) were Serbs, 3 identified as Yugoslavs, 2 were Croats, 4 belonged to other or undeclared ethnic groups.

According to the 2013 census, Rogolji had a population of 715 inhabitants.

== Notable person ==
Stevan Dukić (1920–1942), a Yugoslav Partisan and National Hero of Yugoslavia, was born in Rogolji.
