= Lijevča, Zavidovići =

Lijevča
- Village
- Location within Bosnia and Herzegovina
- Coordinates: 44.3921937°N 18.2091287°E
- Country: Bosnia and Herzegovina
- Entity: Federation of Bosnia and Herzegovina
- Canton: Zenica-Doboj
- Municipality: Zavidovići

Area
  - Total: 6.30 sq mi (16.32 km^{2})

Population (2013)
  - Total: 451
  - Density: 71.6/sq mi (27.6/km^{2})
- Time zone: UTC+1 (CET)
  - Summer (DST): UTC+2 (CEST)

Lijevča is a village in the municipality of Zavidovići, Bosnia and Herzegovina.

== Demographics ==
According to the 2013 census, its population was 451.

Ethnicity in 2013
Ethnicity	Number	Percentage
Bosniaks	449	99.6%
other/undeclared	2	0.4%
Total	451	100%
