= Liskovac (Gradiška) =

Liskovac Лисковац
- Village
- Location within Bosnia and Herzegovina
- Coordinates: 45.1139°N 17.2739°E
- Country: Bosnia and Herzegovina
- Entity: Republika Srpska
- Municipality: Gradiška
- Time zone: UTC+1 (CET)
  - Summer (DST): UTC+2 (CEST)

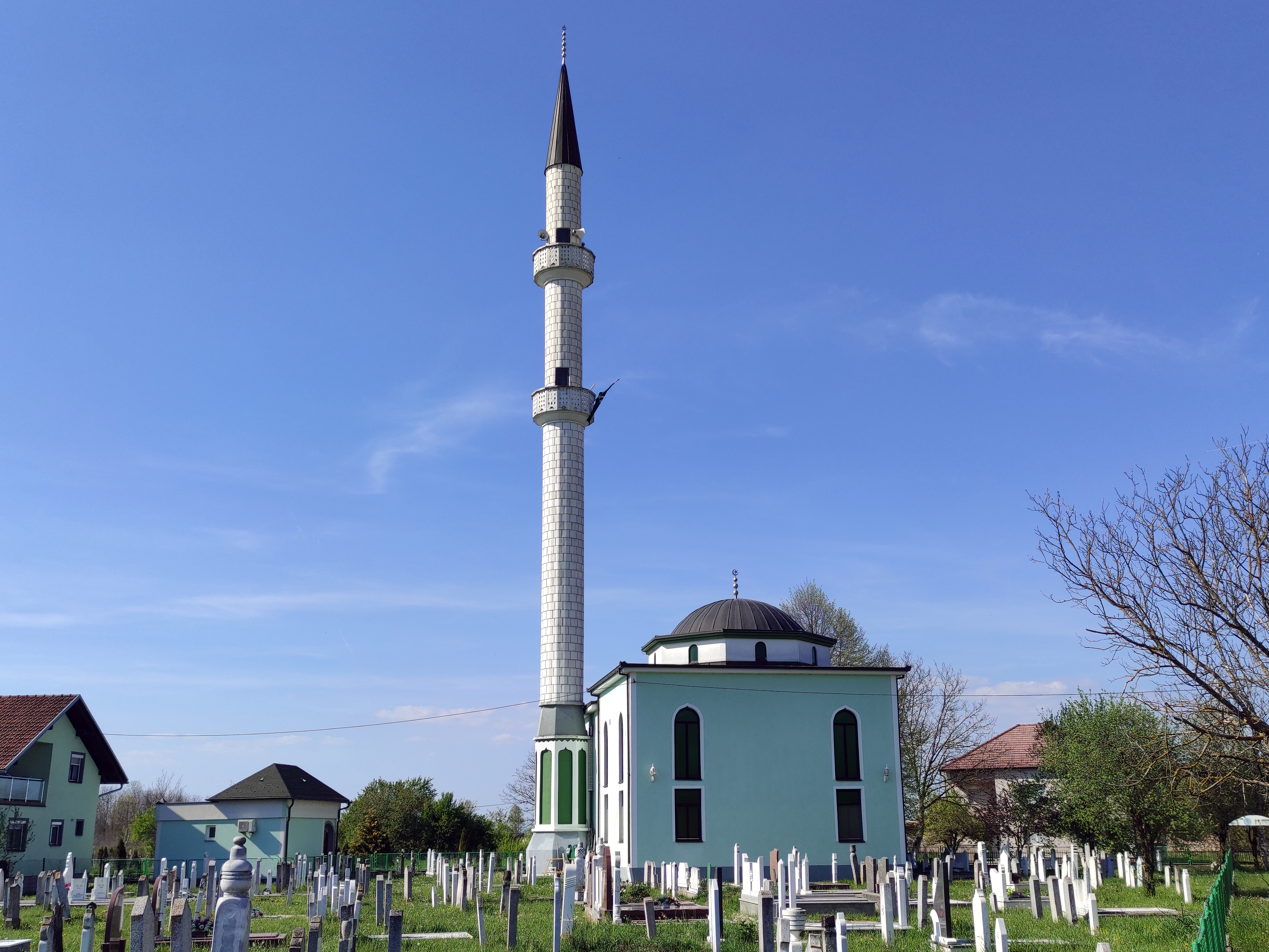
Mosque in Liskovac, Gradiška

Liskovac (Serbian Cyrillic: Лисковац) is a village in the municipality of Gradiška, Republika Srpska, Bosnia and Herzegovina.
