= Kočićevo, Bačka Topola =

Coordinates: 45°51′N 19°41′E

Kočićevo (Кочићево) was a former village in Bačka, Serbia. It was located in the Bačka Topola municipality. In 1971, it was the smallest village in Vojvodina with only 13 families. It was completely abandoned during the 1970s. Today, at the location of the former village, there is only one house and cemetery.

== See also ==
- List of places in Serbia
- List of cities, towns and villages in Vojvodina
