= Gradiška, Bosnia and Herzegovina =

City and municipality in Bosnia and Herzegovina

Gradiška Градишка (Serbian)
- City
- Grad Gradiška; Град Градишка; City of Gradiška
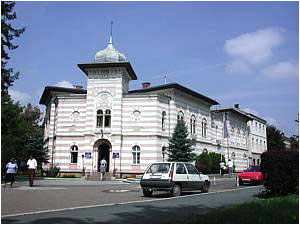
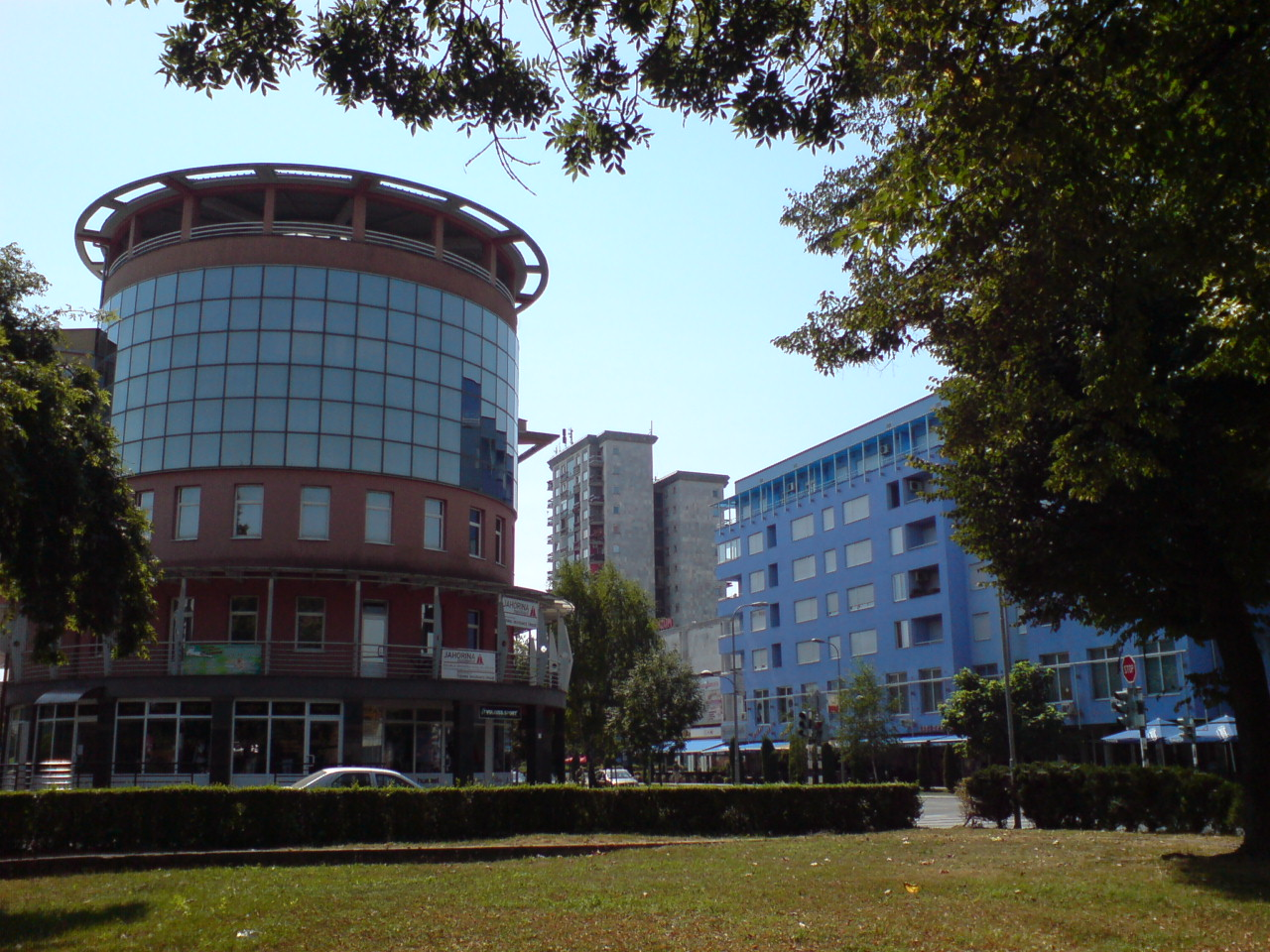
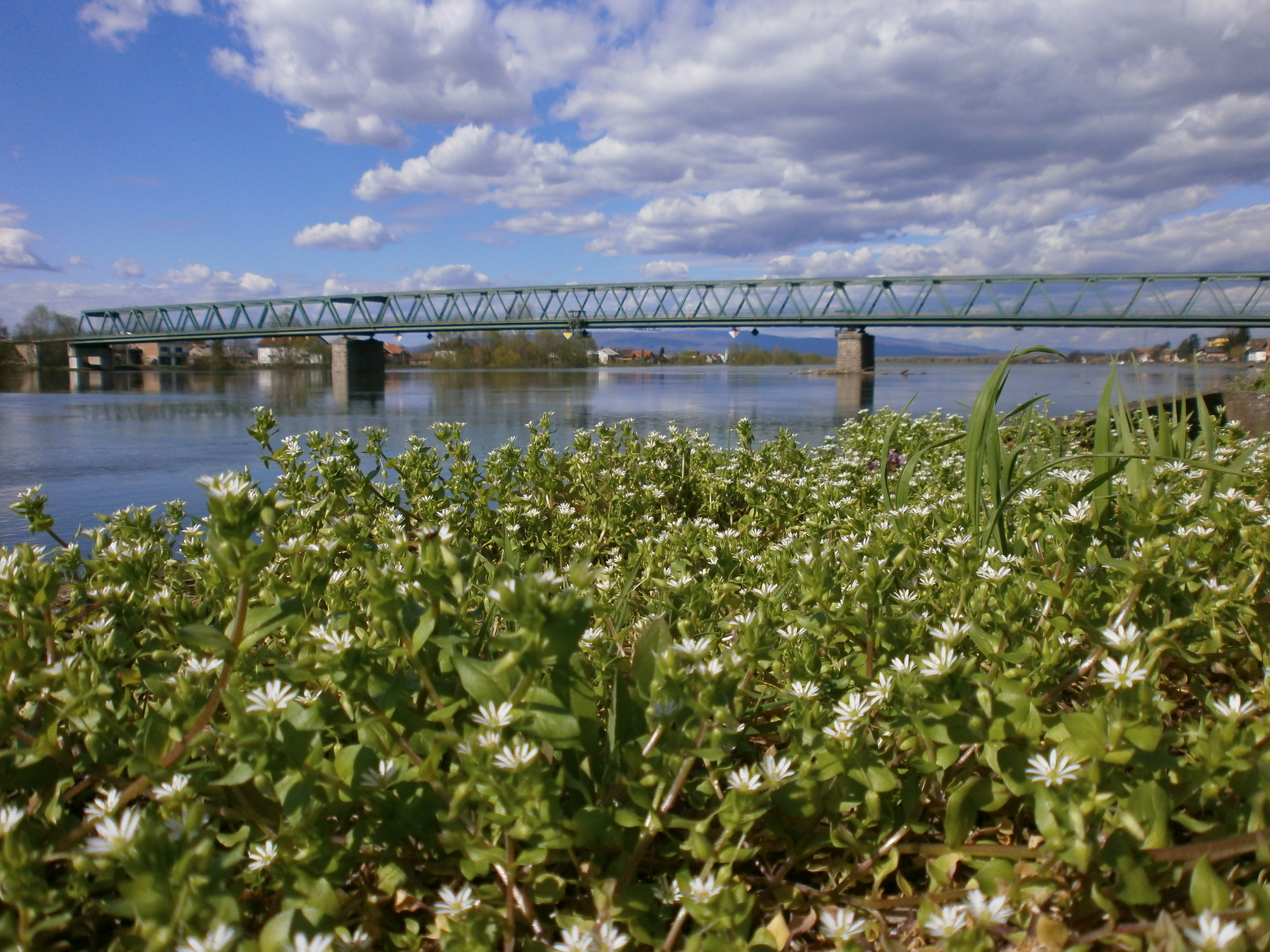
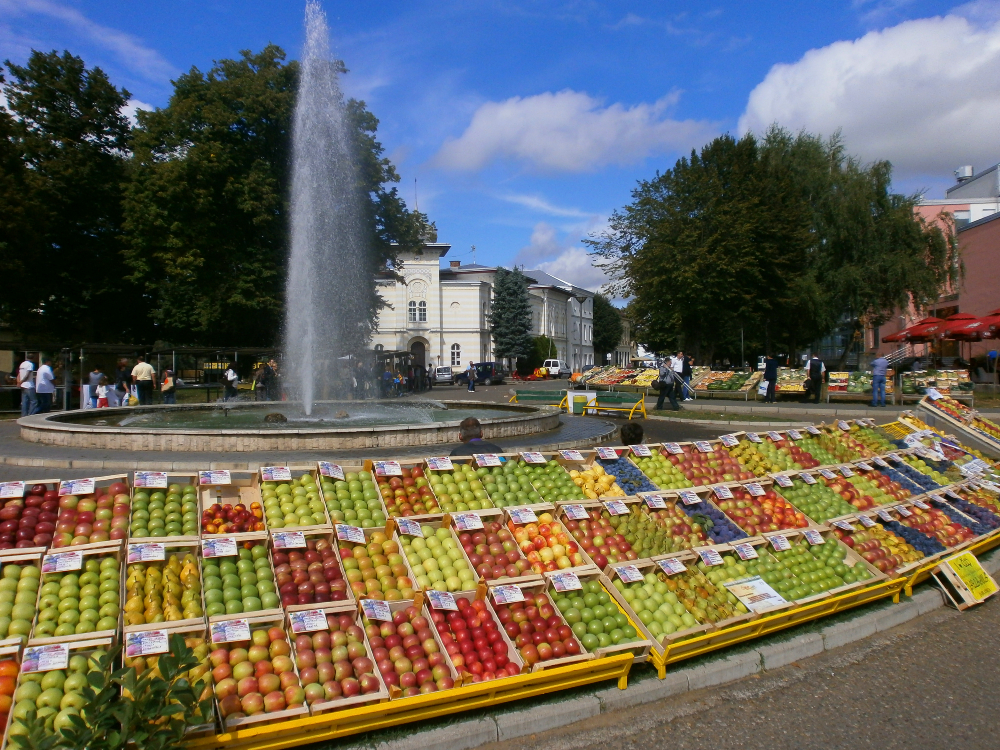
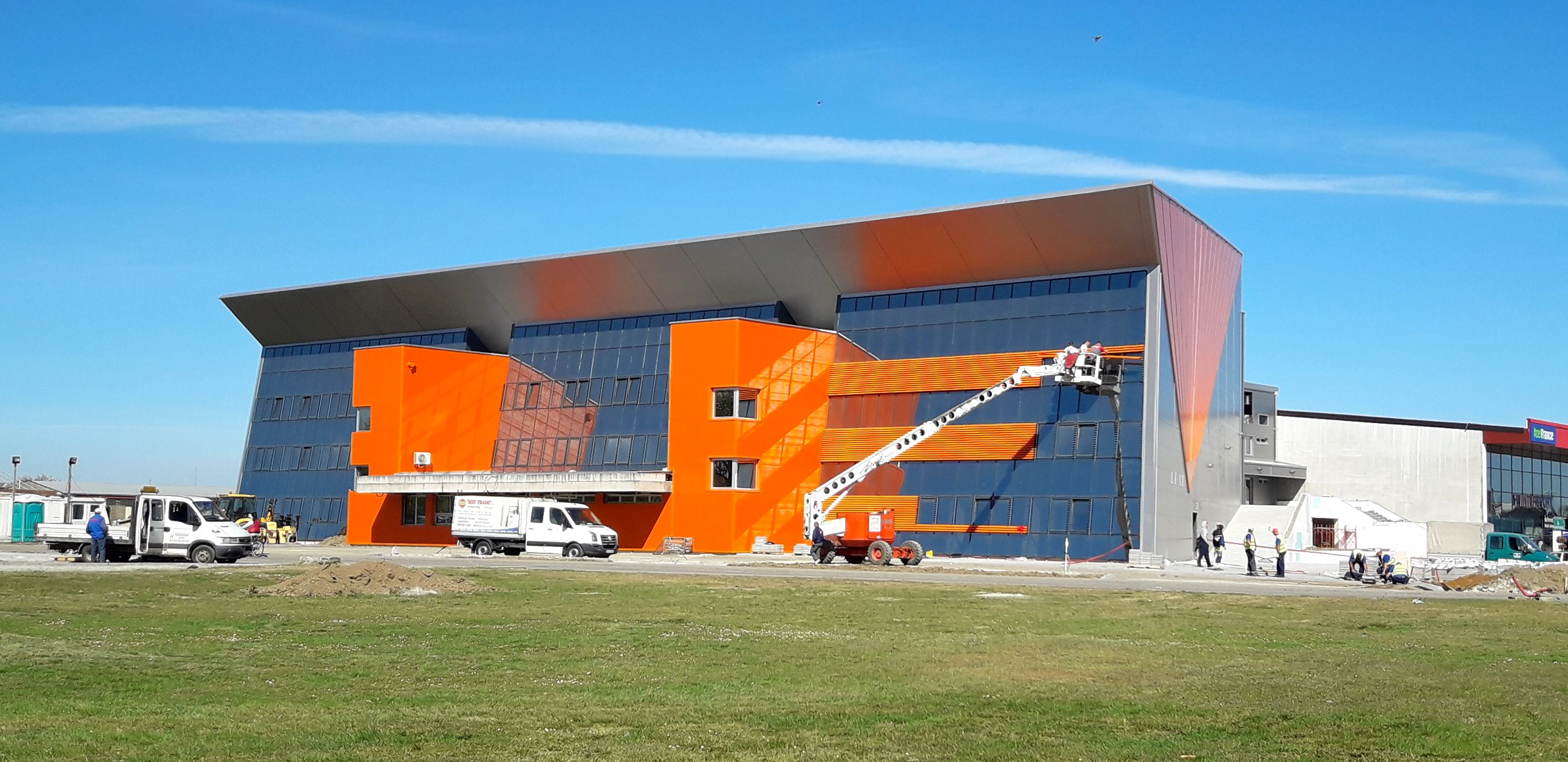
- City of Gradiška

- Flag Coat of arms

- Location of Gradiška within Bosnia and Hercegovina

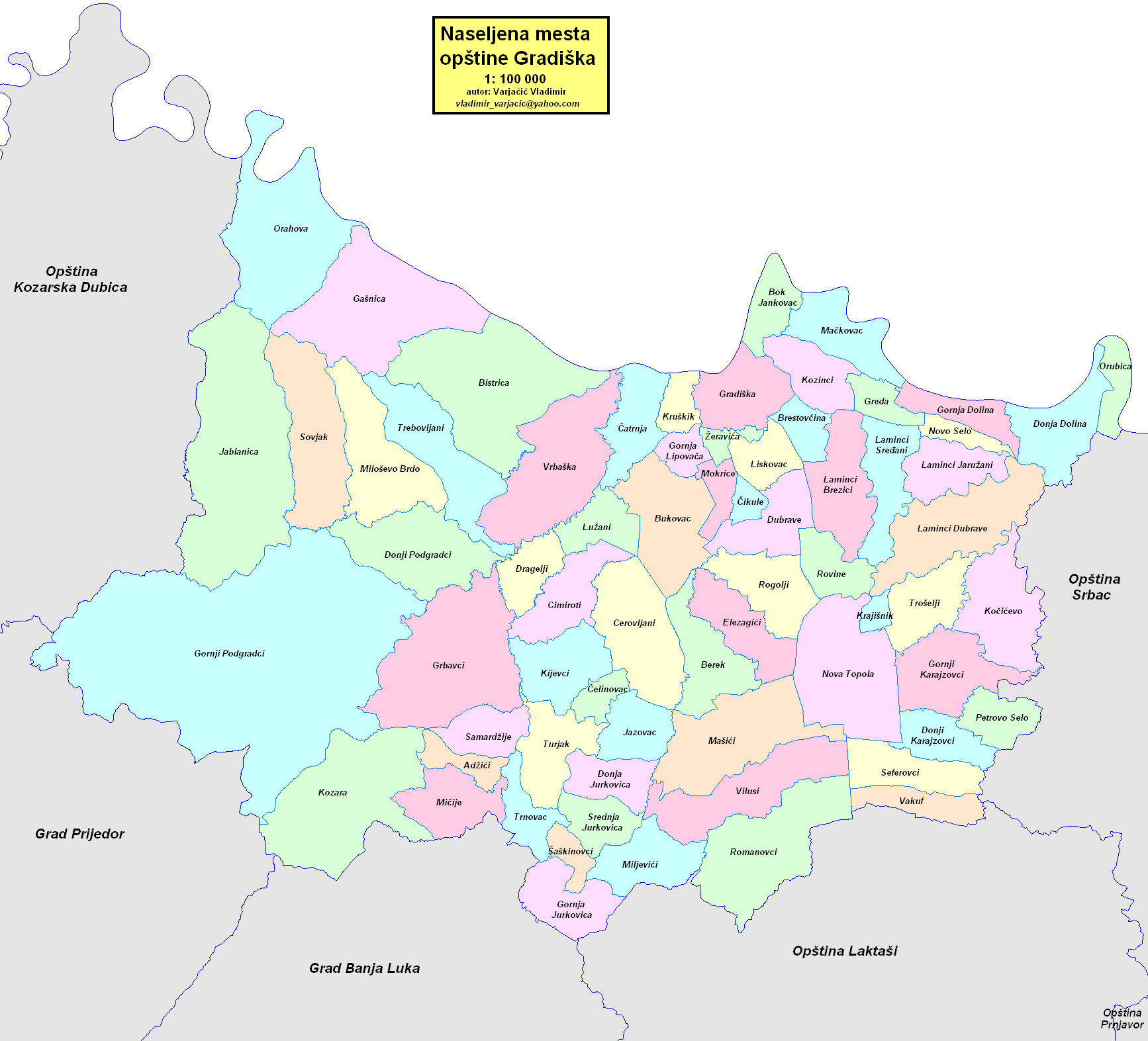
- Coordinates: 45°08′45″N 17°15′14″E
- Country: Bosnia and Herzegovina
- Entity: Republika Srpska
- Geographical region: Bosanska Krajina

Government
  - Mayor: Zoran Adžić (SNSD)
  - City: 761.74 km^{2} (294.11 sq mi)
- Elevation: 163 m (535 ft)

Population (2013 census)
  - City: 51,727
- Time zone: UTC+1 (CET)
  - Summer (DST): UTC+2 (CEST)
- Postal code: 78400
- Area code: +387 51
- Website: www.gradgradiska.com

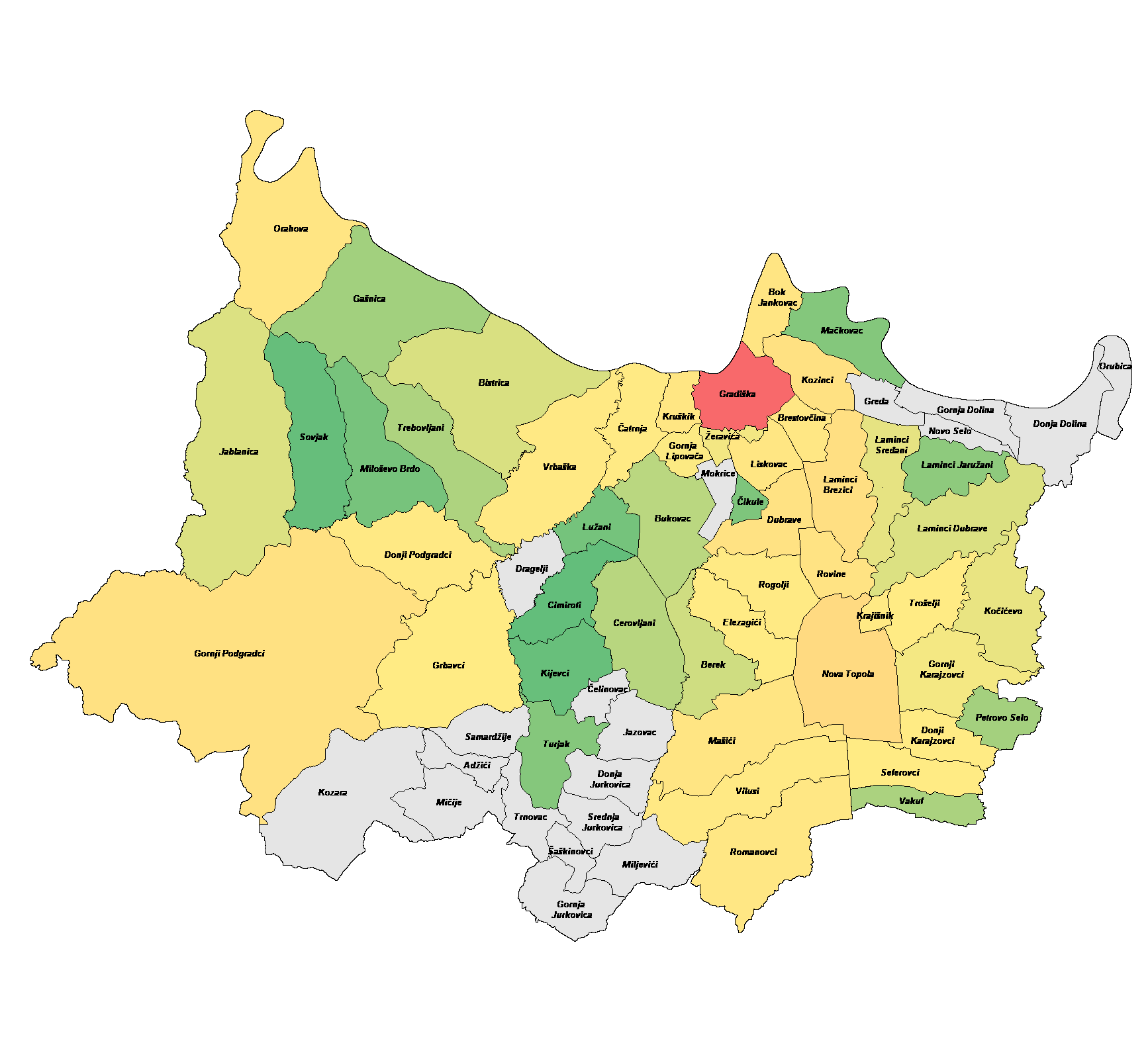
Gradiška municipality by population proportional to the settlement with the highest and lowest population

Gradiška (Serbian Cyrillic: Градишка), formerly Bosanska Gradiška (Serbian Cyrillic: Босанска Градишка) is a city in Republika Srpska, Bosnia and Herzegovina. As of 2013, it has a population of 51,727, while the city of Gradiška has a population of 14,368.

It is located in eastern Krajina region, and the town is situated on the Lijevče plain, on the right bank of the Sava river across from Stara Gradiška, Croatia, and about 40 km (25 mi) north of Banja Luka.

== History ==
In the Roman period this town was of strategic importance; a port of the Roman fleet was situated here. Among notable archaeological findings are a viaduct.

Gradiški Brod is mentioned for the first time as a town in c. 1330. It had a major importance as a Sava river crossing. By 1537, the town and its surroundings came under Ottoman rule.

The Ottoman built a fortress here, which served as the Bosnia Eyalet's northern defense line. The town was also called Berbir or Turska Gradiška because of the fortress. During the Austro-Turkish War, the battle for Turska Gradiška began on 23 June 1789. After the forces of Generalfeldmarschall Ernst Gideon von Laudon captured the fortress on 9 July, Johann Thomas Trattnern made a map of it and Stara Gradiška.

Following the First Serbian Uprising (1804), in the Sanjak of Smederevo (modern Central Serbia), the Jančić's Revolt broke out in the Gradiška region against the Ottoman government in the Bosnia Eyalet, following the erosion of the economic, national and religious rights of Serbs. Hajduks also arrived from Serbia, and were especially active on the Kozara mountain. Jovan Jančić Sarajlija organized the uprising with help from Metropolitan Benedikt Kraljević. The peasants took up arms on 23 September 1809, in the region of Gradiška, beginning from Mašići. The fighting began on September 25, and on the same night, the Ottomans captured and executed Jančić. The rebels retreated to their villages, except those in Kozara and Motajica who continued to offer resistance until their defeat in mid-October, after extensive looting and burning of villages by the Ottomans. Another revolt broke out in 1834, in Mašići.

Ottoman rule ended with the Austro-Hungarian occupation of Bosnia and Herzegovina (1878), following the Herzegovina Uprising (1875–77). Austro-Hungarian rule in Bosnia and Herzegovina ended in 1918, when the South Slavic Austro-Hungarian territories proclaimed the State of Slovenes, Croats and Serbs, which subsequently joined the Kingdom of Serbia into the Kingdom of Yugoslavia.

From 1929 to 1941 Gradiška was part of the Vrbas Banovina of the Kingdom of Yugoslavia.

During Yugoslavia, the town was known as Bosanska Gradiška (Босанска Градишка). During the Bosnian War, the town was incorporated into Republika Srpska (RS). After the war, the RS National Assembly changed the name, omitting bosanska ("Bosnian"), as was done with many other towns (Kostajnica, Dubica, Novi Grad, Petrovo, Šamac).

In the night of 18 November 2004, Catholic priest and parson Kazimir Višaticki was murdered in the clergy house of the St. Roch parish in Gradiška.

== Settlements ==
Aside from the town of Gradiška, the municipality includes total of 73 other settlements:

- Adžići
- Baraji
- Berek
- Bistrica
- Bok Jankovac
- Brestovčina
- Bukovac
- Bukvik
- Cerovljani
- Cimiroti
- Čatrnja
- Čelinovac
- Čikule
- Donja Dolina
- Donja Jurkovica
- Donji Karajzovci
- Donji Podgradci
- Dragelji
- Dubrave
- Dušanovo
- Elezagići
- Gašnica
- Gornja Dolina
- Gornja Jurkovica
- Gornja Lipovača
- Gornji Karajzovci
- Gornji Podgradci
- Grbavci
- Greda
- Jablanica
- Jazovac
- Jelići
- Kijevci
- Kočićevo
- Kozara
- Kozinci
- Krajčinovac
- Krajišnik
- Kruškik
- Laminci Brezici
- Laminci Dubrave
- Laminci Jaružani
- Laminci Sređani
- Liskovac
- Lužani
- Mačkovac
- Mašići
- Mičije
- Miloševo Brdo
- Miljevići
- Mokrice
- Nova Topola
- Novo Selo
- Orahova
- Orubica
- Petrovo Selo
- Rogolji
- Romanovci
- Rovine
- Samardžije
- Seferovci
- Sovjak
- Srednja Jurkovica
- Stara Topola
- Šaškinovci
- Trebovljani
- Trnovac
- Trošelji
- Turjak
- Vakuf
- Vilusi
- Vrbaška
- Žeravica

== Demographics ==
=== Population ===
Population of settlements – Gradiška municipality
	Settlement	1885.	1895.	1910.	1921.	1931.	1948	1953.	1961.	1971.	1981.	1991.	2013.
	Total	29,962	37,797	41,868	45,190	57,235	46,013	48,056	50,143	53,581	58,095	59,974	51,727
1	Berek											482	412
2	Bistrica											795	432
3	Bok Jankovac											754	1,161
4	Brestovčina											360	1,027
5	Bukovac											349	371
6	Čatrnja											768	697
7	Cerovljani											604	367
8	Čikule											369	255
9	Cimiroti											331	202
10	Donji Karajzovci											600	548
11	Donji Podgradci											957	758
12	Dubrave											2,581	1,534
13	Elezagići											561	528
14	Gašnica											443	324
15	Gornja Lipovača											992	500
16	Gornji Karajzovci											537	484
17	Gornji Podgradci											2,378	1,656
18	Gradiška						5,590	9,932	6,363	9,585	13.475	16,841	14,368
19	Grbavci											991	594
20	Jablanica											745	438
21	Kijevci											381	212
22	Kočićevo											631	463
23	Kozinci											908	1,661
24	Krajišnik											528	617
25	Kruškik											1,074	1,119
26	Laminci Brezici											1,415	1,847
27	Laminci Dubrave											591	438
28	Laminci Jaružani											394	287
29	Laminci Sređani											574	456
30	Liskovac											1,467	1,080
31	Lužani											275	238
32	Mačkovac											476	266
33	Mašići											1,359	1,153
34	Miloševo Brdo											439	241
35	Nova Topola											2,191	2,324
36	Orahova											2,479	1,185
37	Petrovo Selo											358	329
38	Rogolji											741	668
39	Romanovci											1,199	976
40	Rovine											1,016	1,422
41	Seferovci											502	504
42	Sovjak											307	208
43	Trebovljani											425	348
44	Trošelji											550	559
45	Turjak											415	268
46	Vakuf											416	342
47	Vilusi											887	736
48	Vrbaška											1,057	779
49	Žeravica											335	482

=== Ethnic composition ===
Ethnic composition – Gradiška city
Nationality	2013.	1991.	1981.	1971.
Total	14,368 (100,0%)	16,841 (100,0%)	13,475 (100,0%)	9,585 (100,0%)
Serbs	11,122 (77,41%)	6,502 (38,61%)	4,251 (31,55%)	2,911 (30,37%)
Bosniaks	2,408 (16,76%)	7,188 (42,68%)	5,033 (37,35%)	5,377 (56,10%)
Croats	294 (2,046%)	781 (4,637%)	730 (5,417%)	808 (8,430%)
Unaffiliated	214 (1,489%)			
Others	174 (1,211%)	582 (3,456%)	99 (0,735%)	121 (1,262%)
Yugoslavs	38 (0,264%)	1,788 (10,62%)	3 218 (23,88%)	306 (3,192%)
Roma	34 (0,237%)		42 (0,312%)	9 (0,094%)
Albanians	29 (0,202%)		44 (0,327%)	25 (0,261%)
Ukrainians	17 (0,118%)			
Unknown	16 (0,111%)			
Montenegrins	14 (0,097%)		29 (0,215%)	12 (0,125%)
Slovenes	5 (0,035%)		20 (0,148%)	14 (0,146%)
Macedonians	3 (0,021%)		9 (0,067%)	2 (0,021%)

Ethnic composition – Gradiška Municipality
Nationality	2013.	1991.	1981.	1971.
Total	51,727 (100,0%)	59,974 (100,0%)	58,095 (100,0%)	53,581 (100,0%)
Serbs	41,863 (80,93%)	35,753 (59,61%)	32,825 (56,50%)	35,038 (65,39%)
Bosniaks	7,580 (14,65%)	15,851 (26,43%)	13,026 (22,42%)	12,688 (23,68%)
Croats	826 (1,597%)	3,417 (5,697%)	3,544 (6,100%)	4,415 (8,240%)
Unaffiliated	416 (0,804%)			
Roma	395 (0,764%)		232 (0,399%)	29 (0,054%)
Others	340 (0,657%)	1,642 (2,738%)	660 (1,136%)	849 (1,585%)
Ukrainians	111 (0,215%)			
Yugoslavs	76 (0,147%)	3,311 (5,521%)	7,638 (13,15%)	415 (0,775%)
Unknown	43 (0,083%)			
Albanians	30 (0,058%)		70 (0,120%)	56 (0,105%)
Montenegrins	29 (0,056%)		57 (0,098%)	61 (0,114%)
Slovenes	14 (0,027%)		31 (0,053%)	25 (0,047%)
Macedonians	4 (0,008%)		12 (0,021%)	5 (0,009%)

== Culture ==
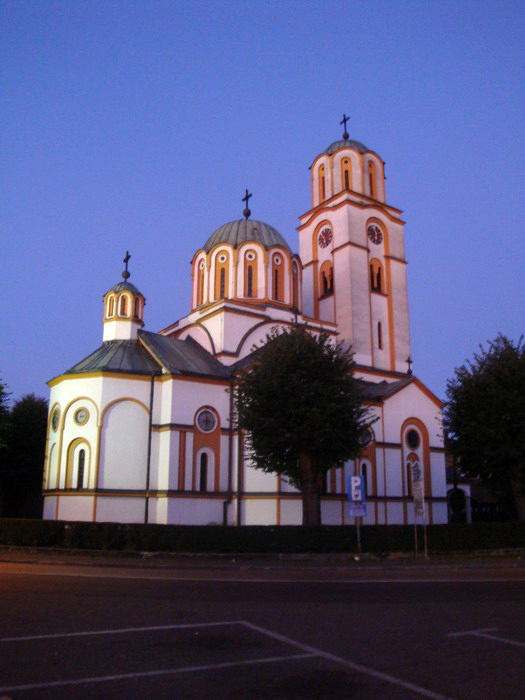
Serbian Orthodox church in Gradiška.

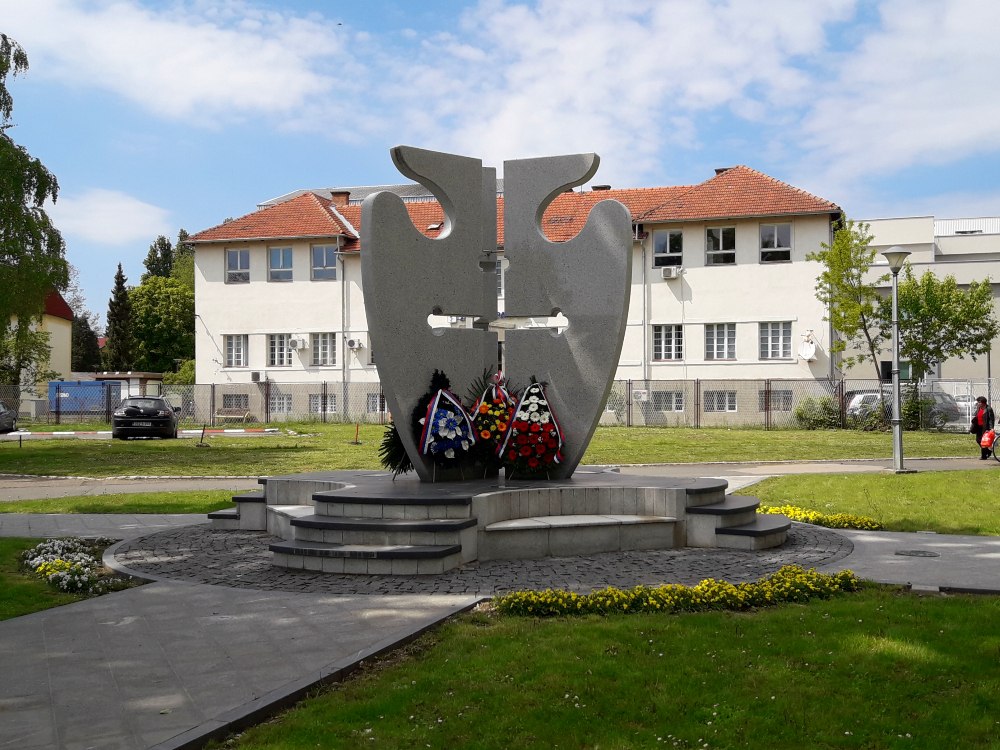
Monument dedicated to the fallen Serb fighters of the Bosnian War

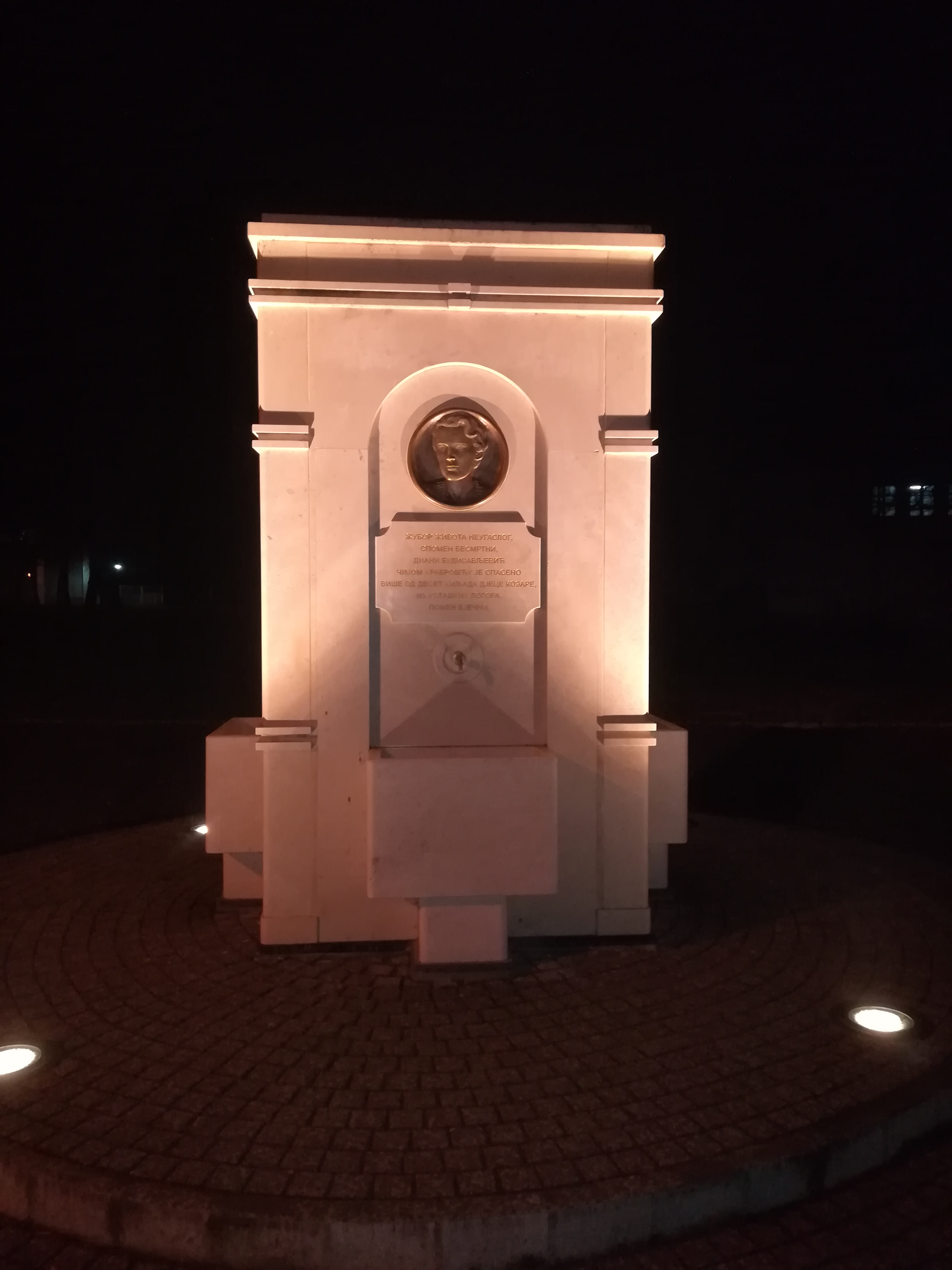
Memorial fountain dedicated to Diana Budisavljević

The town has a Serbian Orthodox cathedral dedicated to the Mother of God. There is also a mosque called the Džamija Begluk.

== Sports ==
Local football club Kozara have played in the top tier of the Bosnia and Herzegovina football pyramid but spent most seasons in the country's second level First League of the Republika Srpska.

== Economy ==
The following table gives a preview of total number of registered people employed in legal entities per their core activity (as of 2018):

Activity	Total
Agriculture, forestry and fishing	320
Mining and quarrying	4
Manufacturing	2,916
Electricity, gas, steam and air conditioning supply	171
Water supply; sewerage, waste management and remediation activities	234
Construction	267
Wholesale and retail trade, repair of motor vehicles and motorcycles	1,956
Transportation and storage	452
Accommodation and food services	543
Information and communication	71
Financial and insurance activities	114
Real estate activities	24
Professional, scientific and technical activities	323
Administrative and support service activities	77
Public administration and defense; compulsory social security	581
Education	840
Human health and social work activities	661
Arts, entertainment and recreation	62
Other service activities	222
Total	9,838

== Notable residents ==
- Alojzije Mišić, Roman Catholic bishop
- Amar Hrnjić Bosnian footballer
- Atif Dudaković, Bosnian war-time army general
- Branko Grahovac, football goalkeeper
- Dženan Čišija, Swedish politician
- Goran Zakarić, Bosnian footballer
- Kristajan Zelonka Serbian footballer
- Marko Marin, German footballer
- Miodrag Latinović, retired footballer
- Nazif Hajdarović, footballer
- Nordin Gerzić, Swedish footballer
- Ognjen Ožegović, Serbian footballer, European U-19 champion
- Ozren Perić, footballer
- Ratko Varda, basketball player
- Safet Halilović, politician
- Tatjana Pašalić, poker presenter
- Vaso Čubrilović, politician and historian, member of Black Hand organisation and participant in the conspiracy to kill Archduke Franz Ferdinand of Austria.
- Veljko Čubrilović, member of Black Hand organisation
- Vinko Marinović, former Serbian footballer, now manager
- Vlado Jagodić, former footballer, now manager
- Zlatko Janjić, footballer
- Zvjezdan Misimović, Bosnian footballer

== International relations ==
=== Twin towns and sister cities ===
Gradiška is twinned with:

- Kavala, Greece (1994)
- Ćuprija, Serbia (1994)
- Negotino, North Macedonia (2006)
- Montesilvano, Italy (2018)
- Palilula, Serbia (2019)
- Zubin Potok, Rep. of Kosovo (2021)

=== Partnerships ===
Gradiška also cooperates with:

- Banja Luka, Bosnia and Herzegovina (2016)
- Bihać, Bosnia and Herzegovina (2016)
- Bijeljina, Bosnia and Herzegovina (2016)
- Bosanska Krupa, Bosnia and Herzegovina (2016)
- Cazin, Bosnia and Herzegovina (2016)
- Čelinac, Bosnia and Herzegovina (2016)
- Doboj, Bosnia and Herzegovina (2016)
- Kozarska Dubica, Bosnia and Herzegovina (2016)
- Foča, Bosnia and Herzegovina (2016)
- Goražde, Bosnia and Herzegovina (2016)
- Gračanica, Bosnia and Herzegovina (2016)
- Gradačac, Bosnia and Herzegovina (2016)
- Kalesija, Bosnia and Herzegovina (2016)
- Konjic, Bosnia and Herzegovina (2016)
- Maglaj, Bosnia and Herzegovina (2016)
- Modriča, Bosnia and Herzegovina (2016)
- Mostar, Bosnia and Herzegovina (2016)
- Novi Grad, Bosnia and Herzegovina (2016)
- Odžak, Bosnia and Herzegovina (2016)
- Orašje, Bosnia and Herzegovina (2016)
- Prijedor, Bosnia and Herzegovina (2016)
- Prnjavor, Bosnia and Herzegovina (2016)
- Sanski Most, Bosnia and Herzegovina (2016)
- Srebrenik, Bosnia and Herzegovina (2016)
- Šamac, Bosnia and Herzegovina (2016)
- Teslić, Bosnia and Herzegovina (2016)
- Tešanj, Bosnia and Herzegovina (2016)
- Tuzla, Bosnia and Herzegovina (2016)
- Vareš, Bosnia and Herzegovina (2016)
- Velika Kladuša, Bosnia and Herzegovina (2016)
- Žepče, Bosnia and Herzegovina (2016)
- Živinice, Bosnia and Herzegovina (2016)
- Laktaši, Bosnia and Herzegovina (2018)
- Čačak, Serbia (2018)
- Herceg Novi, Montenegro (2018)
- Hersonissos, Greece (2018)
- Labin, Croatia (2018)
- Nova Gorica, Slovenia (2018)
- Ragusa, Italy (2018)
- Shkodër, Albania (2018)
- Tirana, Albania (2018)
- Daruvar, Croatia (2020)
- Lipik, Croatia (2020)
- Jesi, Italy (2020)
- Marche, Italy (2020)
- Mošćenička Draga, Croatia (2020)
- Kotor, Montenegro (2020)
- Tepelenë, Albania (2020)

== See also ==
- Municipalities of Republika Srpska
- Subdivisions of Bosnia and Herzegovina

== Bibliography ==
- Trattnern, Johann Thomas (1789). Carte der Belagerung und Eroberung der Festung Berbir oder Türkisch Gradisca (Map). Signature HR-ZaNSK S-JZ-XVIII-147.
