= Balkan music =

Regional music

Balkan music refers to diverse musical traditions of the Balkans region in Europe. In its broadest sense, it encompasses music across the countries of Albania, Bosnia and Herzegovina, Bulgaria, Croatia, Greece, Hungary, Kosovo, Moldova, Montenegro, North Macedonia, Romania, Serbia and Slovenia, as well as European Turkey. Notably, alongside the music of the ethnic majorities in these countries, it includes music by Romani and Turks in the region. The music is characterised by complex rhythm. Famous bands include Taraf de Haïdouks, Fanfare Ciocărlia, and No Smoking Orchestra.

== Historical musical influences ==
=== Byzantine medieval music ===
Byzantine music (Greek: Βυζαντινή Μουσική) is associated with the medieval sacred chant of Christian Churches following the Constantinopolitan rite. Its modal system is based on the ancient Greek models. The development of large scale hymnographic forms begins in the fifth century with the rise of the kontakion, a long and elaborate metrical sermon, which finds its acme in the work of Romanos the Melodist (sixth century). Heirmoi in syllabic style are gathered in the Irmologion, a bulky volume which first appeared in the middle of the tenth century and contains over a thousand model troparia arranged into an octoechos (the eight-mode musical system) and the whole system of Byzantine music which is closely related to the music of ancient Greece.

=== Greek music ===
Greek folk music includes Demotika, Cretan and Nisiotika, Pontian, Laiko and Rebetiko. Greek music developed around the Balkans as a synthesis of elements of the music of the various areas of the Greek mainland and the Greek islands, with Greek Orthodox ecclesiastical chant, and a reference to music of Crete and Byzantine music. The music of the Aegean Islands, are known for Nisiótika songs; Greek characteristics vary widely. Crete has a well known folk dance tradition; it includes swift dances like pentozalis. Most of the Greek folk songs are accompanied by Greek musical instruments like: lira, clarinet, guitar, violin and sometimes mandolin. Greek folk dances include Kalamatianos, Syrtos and Sousta.

=== Ottoman music ===
A number of musical instruments were introduced to the Balkans during the Ottoman era, such as the tambura, tapan, and zurna.

The influence of Mehter and Turkish rhythms and melodies can be seen in Balkan Music. In the 19th century in imitation of the Turkish military bands which replaced the mehterhâne formations of Janissary Turks beginning in 1828. Apparently, as in Turkey, they dethroned the ancient traditional oboe (zurna, zurla, or mizmar) and double-membraned drum ensembles.

Dimitrie Cantemir was a composer of Ottoman music.

== Pre-modern Balkan music ==
=== Traditional Bosnian music ===
Sevdalinka is a traditional genre of folk music originating in Bosnia and Herzegovina. Sevdalinka is an integral part of the Bosniak culture, but it is spread among the other peoples of Bosnia and Herzegovina and across the ex-Yugoslav region as well, including Croatia, Montenegro, North Macedonia and Serbia. The actual composers of many sevdalinka songs are unknown because these are traditional folk songs. In 2024, sevdalinka was included on the UNESCO Representative List of the Intangible Cultural Heritage of Humanity.

=== Traditional Bulgarian music ===
Traditional folk instruments in Bulgarian music include various kinds of bagpipes (gaida and kaba gaida); drums (tapan); tarambuka; bells; daire; clapper; zilmasha; praportsi. Woodwind diple: zurla; kaval; duduk; dvoyanka; ocarina; accordion. String instruments: gadulka; tambura; fiddle; mandolin; guitar and gusle.

=== Traditional Serbian music ===
During the Nemanjić dynasty, musicians played an important role in the royal court, and were known as sviralnici, glumci and praskavnici. Other rulers known for the musical patronage included Stefan Dušan, Stefan Lazarević, and Đurađ Branković. Medieval musical instruments included horns, trumpets, lutes, psalteries and cymbals.

== Derivatives and world music ==
=== Romanian and Romani brass band ===
Fanfare Ciocărlia got many fans in Europe with their powerful brass sound appealing to rock and rave fans as well as the world music audience. In 1997 Ernst and Neumann took Fanfare Ciocărlia into Bucharest's Studio Electrecord to record their debut album. The album, Radio Pascani, was released on the Berlin record label Piranha Musik in 1998 and proved an instant success. Another popular band in Romania was Taraf de Haïdouks.

=== Progressive Balkan folk ===
Progressive Balkan folk has seen rise in many western countries, particularly the United States. It has had its greatest success with progressive communities across the country. Younger American generations are discovering the possibilities of this genre and are bringing it to small clubs and festivals across the US.

The upbeat, dramatic tone of the music has also attracted a following in the Tribal Fusion bellydance community. Tribal Fusion does not claim to emulate traditional dances, costume or music styles strictly, but it does draw inspiration from Balkan traditions.

=== Balkan soul and funk ===
Bay Area, CA band Inspector Gadje plays mainly traditional and contemporary balkan dance tunes, but because of the varied background of its musicians, elements of jazz and experimental music can be heard.

Brooklyn-based Slavic Soul Party! is an ensemble of brass musicians that mix traditional balkan rhythms and beats with jazz, soul, funk and dance pop.

British based band Sam and the Womp have rooted their music in the Balkan funk style to create a modern feel along with catchy and energetic rhythm.

Oakland, CA based artist Balkan Bump mixes Eastern European diasporic music with Electronic Music and Hip Hop.

=== Balkan beats ===
Traditional Balkan music mixed with modern, electronic beats: this genre first appeared in the Berlin underground scene in the mid-1990s. The term was coined by Berlin DJ Robert Soko, whose BalkanBeats monthly parties still continue nowadays. It then spread to the European and world scene, to become an established genre nowadays.

== Music per country and ethnicity ==
- Music of Albania
- Aromanian music
- Music of Bosnia and Herzegovina
- Music of Bulgaria
- Music of Greece
- Music of Hungary
- Music of Kosovo
- Music of Moldova
- Music of Montenegro
- Music of North Macedonia
- Romani music
- Music of Romania
- Music of Serbia
- Music of Slovenia
- Music of Turkey

== Notable artists ==
=== Albania ===
- Aleksandër Peçi
- Armaldo Kllogjeri
- Avni Mula
- Tish Daija
- Elhaida Dani
- Elvana Gjata
- Simon Gjoni
- Tonin Harapi
- Inva Mula
- Ermonela Jaho
- Akil Mark Koci
- Feim Ibrahimi
- Prenkë Jakova
- Parashqevi Simaku
- Palokë Kurti
- Aleksandër Peçi
- Vasil Tole
- Çesk Zadeja
- Nikolla Zoraqi
- David Tukiçi
- Pirro Çako
- Vaçe Zela
- Tefta Tashko-Koço

=== Bulgaria ===
- Azis
- Sofi Marinova
- Preslava
- Raina Kabaivanska
- Ivan Shopov
- Valya Balkanska
- Lyubka Rondova
- Ivo Papazov
- Theodosii Spassov
- Stoyan Yankoulov
- Elitsa Todorova
- Lili Ivanova
- Nicolai Ghiaurov
- Miro
- Maria Ilieva
- Poli Genova
- Papi Hans
- Gergana
- Dara

=== Bosnia and Herzegovina ===
- Adnan Babajić
- Al' Dino (Aldin Kurić)
- Alen Islamović
- Alma Čardžić
- Amir Kazić Leo
- Asim Brkan
- Azra Kolaković
- Baja Mali Knindža
- Beba Selimović
- Bijelo Dugme
- Boris Novković
- Crvena jabuka
- Dado Džihan
- Davor Badrov
- Fuad Backović
- Dejan Matić
- Dina Bajraktarević
- Dino Merlin
- Disciplinska komisija
- Divlje jagode
- DJ Krmak
- Dubioza kolektiv
- Duško Kuliš
- Edo Mulahalilović
- Edo Maajka (Edin Osmić)
- Eldin Huseinbegović
- Elvir Laković Laka
- Enes Begović
- Erato
- Esad Plavi
- Frenkie
- Goran Bregović
- Halid Bešlić
- Halid Muslimović
- Hamdija Čustović
- Hanka Paldum
- Haris Džinović
- Hari Mata Hari
- Himzo Polovina
- Indira Radić
- Jasmin Muharemovic
- Kemal Malovčić
- Kemal Monteno
- Lepa Brena
- Maja Sarihodžić
- Marinko Rokvić
- Marta Savić
- Mate Bulić
- Maya Berović
- Meho Puzić
- Mile Kitić
- Milena Plavšić
- Miloš Bojanić
- Mirjana Bajraktarević
- Mitar Mirić
- Mladen Vojičić Tifa
- Mostar Sevdah Reunion
- Nada Topčagić
- Nikola/Amir "Nino" Rešić
- Nedeljko Bajić Baja
- Nervozni poštar
- Nihad Alibegović
- Nihad Kantić - Šike
- Osman Hadžić
- Romana (singer)
- Safet Isović
- Sanela Sijerčić
- Sanja Maletić
- Saša Matić
- Sateliti
- Seid Memić
- Sejo Boy
- Seka Aleksić
- Selma Bajrami
- Šemsa Suljaković
- Šerif Konjević
- Silvana Armenulić
- Tomo Miličević – Thirty Seconds to Mars
- Vukašin Brajić
- Zaim Imamović
- Zdravko Čolić
- Zehra Deović
- Željko Bebek
- Željko Samardžić
- Sinan Sakić

=== Croatia ===
- Arsen Dedić
- Azra
- Balkan Zoo
- Buki Skandal
- Daleka Obala
- Dino Dvornik
- Hladno Pivo
- Josipa Lisac
- Mišo Kovač
- Neno Belan
- Oliver Dragojević
- Parni Valjak
- Prljavo Kazalište
- Severina
- Tereza Kesovija
- Vanna

=== Greece ===
- Mikis Theodorakis
- Tolis Voskopoulos
- Marinella
- George Dalaras
- Maria Farantouri
- Mario Frangoulis
- Demis Roussos
- Helena Paparizou
- Eleftheria Eleftheriou
- Vicky Moscholiou
- Nana Mouskouri
- Argyris Nastopoulos
- Apostolos Nikolaidis
- Marika Ninou
- Anna Vissi
- Antique (duo)
- Apostolia Zoi
- Chryspa
- Giorgos Papadopoulos
- George Michael
- Loukas Daralas
- Hrysoula Stefanaki
- Chronis Aidonidis
- Peter André
- Annette Artani
- Eleftheria Arvanitaki
- Agnes Baltsa
- Haris Alexiou
- Dionysis Makris
- Kelly Kelekidou
- Nancy Alexiadi
- Notis Sfakianakis
- Katy Garbi
- Kostas Martakis
- Panos Tserpes
- Marianda Pieridi
- Konstantinos Christoforou
- Konstantinos Argyros
- Paschalis Terzis
- Maria Callas
- Panos Kiamos
- Nikos Vertis
- Giorgos Perris
- Sakis Rouvas
- Thanos Petrelis
- Vasilis Karras
- Thanos Kalliris
- Nektaria Karantzi
- Giorgos Mazonakis
- Dimitris Mitropanos
- Vicky Leandros
- Labis Livieratos
- Mando
- Lisa Andreas
- Marlen Angelidou
- Lindsay Armaou
- Lia Vissi
- Peggy Zina
- Marianna Zorba
- Theodosia Tsatsou
- Mariana Efstratiou
- Elpida
- Evridiki
- Loukas Giorkas
- Popi Maliotaki
- Aris Christofellis
- Constantinos Christoforou
- Cleopatra
- Natassa Theodoridou
- Marios Tokas
- Michalis Rakintzis
- Antonis Remos
- Babis Tsertos
- Prodromos Kathiniotis
- Stelios Kazantzidis
- Alex Varkatzas

=== Hungary ===
- Ando Drom
- Balkan Union
- Besh o droM
- Csík Zenekar
- DESH
- G.w.M
- Herceg
- Joci Pápai
- Kalyi Jag
- Márió
- Opitz Barbara
- Parno Graszt
- Poklade
- Söndörgő
- Vujicsics Ensemble

=== Kosovo ===
- Tingulli 3nt
- Unikkatil
- Lyrical Son
- Era Istrefi
- Majk (rapper)
- DJ Regard
- Dafina Zeqiri
- Adelina Ismajli
- Genta Ismajli
- Nora Istrefi
- Vedat Ademi
- Ardian Bujupi
- Capital T
- MC Kresha
- Leonora Jakupi
- Ermal Fejzullahu
- Nexhmije Pagarusha
- Lorenc Antoni
- Mark Marku
- Nevena Božović
- Kidda

=== North Macedonia ===
- Aleksandar Belov
- Adrian Gaxha
- Andrijana Janevska
- Bobi Andonov
- Bojana Atanasovska
- "Bravo Band"
- Dani Dimitrovska
- Elena Petreska
- Elena Risteska
- Elvira Rahić
- Elvir Mekić
- Eva Nedinkovska
- Ipče Ahmedovski
- Jašar Ahmedovski
- Kaliopi
- Karolina Gočeva
- Kristina Arnaudova
- Lambe Alabakoski
- Martin Vučić
- Muharem Serbezovski
- Riste Tevdoski
- Simon Kiselicki
- Tamara Todevska
- Tijana Dapčević
- Toše Proeski
- Vaska Ilieva
- Vlado Janevski
- Vlatko Lozanoski
- Vrčak
- Zoran Vanev

=== Montenegro ===
- Andrea Demirović
- Bojan Marović
- Boban Rajović
- Dado Polumenta
- Daniel (Montenegrin singer)
- Dolce Hera
- Ekrem Jevrić
- Goga Sekulić
- Goran Vukošić
- Jadranka Barjaktarović
- Kaja (singer)
- Knez (singer)
- Milomir Miljanić
- Sanja Đorđević
- Šako Polumenta
- Sergej Ćetković
- Vanja Radovanović
- Vlado Georgiev
- Vesna Zmijanac
- Who See
- Zoran Kalezić

=== Romania ===
- Adrian Enescu
- Alexandra Stan
- Alina Eremia
- Anna Lesko
- Antonia Iacobescu
- Connect-R
- Dan Balan
- Dan Bittman
- Delia Matache
- Edward Maya
- Elena Gheorghe
- Fanfare Ciocărlia
- Gică Cristea
- Inna
- Ionica Minune
- Loredana Groza
- Luminiţa Anghel
- Mahala Rai Banda
- Marcel Pavel
- Mădălina Manole
- Monica Anghel
- Nico (Romanian singer)
- Octave Octavian Teodorescu
- Smiley
- Ștefan Bănică, Jr.
- Taraf de Haïdouks
- Vlad Miriţă

=== Slovenia ===
- Amala
- Balkan Boys
- Brina
- Imer Traja Brizani
- Katja Šulc
- Katalena
- Magnifico
- Murat & Jose
- Romano Glauso
- Senidah
- Šukar
- Terrafolk
- Vlado Kreslin

=== Serbia ===
- Aca Lukas
- Aco Pejović
- Ana Nikolić
- Bajaga i Instruktori
- Belo Platno
- Beogradski Sindikat
- Bilja Krstić
- Boban Marković
- Bora Drljača
- Ceca
- Dalibor Andonov Gru
- Danijel Pavlović
- Dara Bubamara
- Darko Lazić (singer)
- Dragan Kojić Keba
- Dragana Mirković
- Džej Ramadanovski
- Dženan Lončarević
- Đani
- Đogani
- Đorđe Balašević
- Đorđe Novković
- Emina Jahović
- Era Ojdanić
- Félix Lajkó
- Goca Tržan
- Hasan Dudić
- Ivana Selakov
- Jana (singer)
- Janika Balázs
- Jelena Karleuša
- Jelena Tomašević
- Katarina Grujic
- Katarina Zivkovic
- Lepa Lukić
- Maja Marijana
- Maya Berović
- Marija Šerifović
- Mia Borisavljević
- Milan Stanković
- Milica Pavlović
- Milica Todorović
- Mina Kostić
- Mira Škorić
- Miroslav Ilić
- Nataša Bekvalac
- Nataša Đorđević
- Nemanja Nikolić (singer)
- Nikolija
- No Smoking Orchestra
- Novica Urošević
- Novica Zdravković
- Olivera Katarina
- Olja Karleuša
- Predrag Cune Gojković
- Predrag Živković Tozovac
- Rada Manojlović
- Šaban Bajramović
- Šaban Šaulić
- Sanja Ilić
- Saša Kovačević
- Sejo Kalač
- Seka Aleksić
- Šeki Bihorac
- Šeki Turković
- Sinan Alimanović
- Sinan Sakić
- Slobodan Trkulja
- Snežana Babić
- Stoja
- Suzana Jovanović
- Svetlana Spajić
- Svetlana Tanasić
- Tanja Savić
- Toma Zdravković
- Predrag Živković Tozovac (Folk)
- Vera Matović
- Verica Šerifović
- Vesna Zmijanac
- Viki Miljković
- Željko Joksimović
- Željko Šašić
- Zlata Petrović
- Zorica Brunclik
- Zvonko Bogdan

=== Turkey ===
- Barış Manço
- Simge
- Tarkan
- Mustafa Ceceli
- Mustafa Sandal
- Sezen Aksu
- Serdar Ortaç
- Sertab Erener
- Candan Erçetin
- Ajda Pekkan
- Melih Kibar
- Timur Selçuk
- Suzan Kardeş
- Emina Jahović
- Mehmet Erdem
- Erol Evgin

=== Musical groups elsewhere ===
- Corvus Corax
- Beirut
- A Hawk And A Hacksaw
- Molotov Jukebox
- Balkan Ethno Orchestra
- Petrojvic Blasting Company

== See also ==
- Balkan brass
- Balkan jazz
- Balkan Music Awards
- Byzantine music
- Klezmer (Eastern European Jewish music)
- Pop-folk
- Turkish music
- Romani music
