= Jelena Jovanović =

Jelena Jovanović may refer to:

- Jelena Jovanović (basketball)
- Jelena Jovanović (ethnomusicologist)
- Jelena Jovanović (politician)
