= Muharemović =

Muharemović is a surname. Notable people with the surname include:

- Dželaludin Muharemović (born 1970), Bosnian professional football manager and former player
- Esad Muharemović (born 1965), Bosnian pop-folk singer
- Jasmin Muharemović (born 1965), Bosnian pop-folk singer
- Tarik Muharemović (born 2003), professional footballer
- Veldin Muharemović (born 1984), former Bosnian football player
