= Balkumbia =

Music band from Barcelona

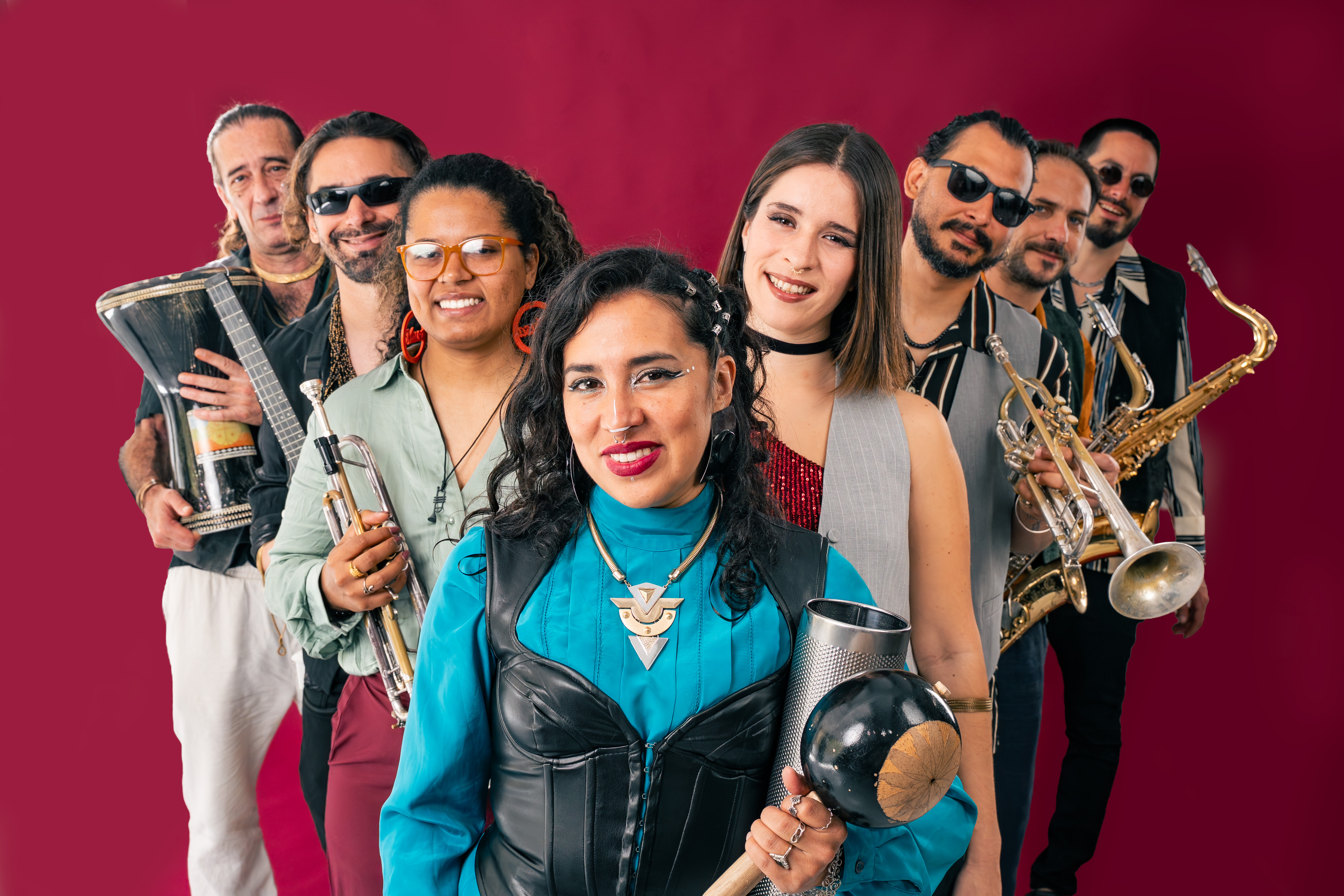

Background information
- Origin: Barcelona
- Genres: Cumbia, Balkan music, world music
- Website: www.balkumbia.com

Balkumbia is a Mestizo fusion band that blends cumbia with Balkan music. It was formed in 2015 in the city of Barcelona, with musicians from Europe and Latinamerica.

Since its formation, Balkumbia has had a presence in the Barcelona music scene, participating on various occasions in international festivals and venues such as Marula or Mariatchi. Their musical proposal has allowed them to perform in renowned venues like Razzmatazz and Sala Apolo, sharing the stage with other artists such as Balkan Beat Box and Chico Trujillo.

== International tours ==
In 2016, Balkumbia embarked on its first tour, performing in 20 concerts across nine European countries, standing out at festivals like Samsara (Hungary), Vida Laska (Greece), and Hootananny (United Kingdom).

In 2017 and 2018, the band performed with notable bands like La Mano Ajena and Anarkia Tropical.

In 2019, Balkumbia was recognized as the best band in Barcelona, before embarking on their second tour of Latin America. The band played in Mexico and Colombia, appearing at venues such as Radio UNAM (Mexico) and Media Torta (Colombia).

In 2022, Balkumbia was invited as the main performance for the Guadalajara International Book Fair (FIL) in Mexico.

== Discography ==
1. Balkumbia (2016)
2. Balkumbia Vol.2 (2017), La Cúpula Music
3. Mala Suerte (2022), Whatabout Music LLC.

== Members ==
=== Current members ===
- Diego Saez – ukulele, vocals (2015–present)
- Pier Paolo Candeloro – saxophone (2015–present)
- Diego Bernal – darbuka (2015–present)
- Jasmany Almanza – bass (2019–present)
- Luis Ducharne – trumpet (2019–present)
- Javiera Paredes – drums (2022–present)
- Estefane Santos – trumpet (2023–present)
- Victoria Laverde – vocals (2024–present)
- Juan Lichter – saxophone (2024–present)

=== Former members ===
- Bora Edizel – guitar (2015–2019)
- Emilio Tarallo – trumpet (2015–2019)
- Andres Perez – bass, drums (2015–2019)
- Ugne Reikalaite – vocals (2015–2023)
- Uri Catala – bass (2016–2017)
- Jose Carlos Olmo – drums (2018–2020)
- Marco Baranzano – guitar (2019–2023)
- Estefania Chamorro – drums (2021–2022)
