= Zenica prison =

Prison in Bosnia and Herzegovina

Coordinates: 44.193647°N 17.913352°E

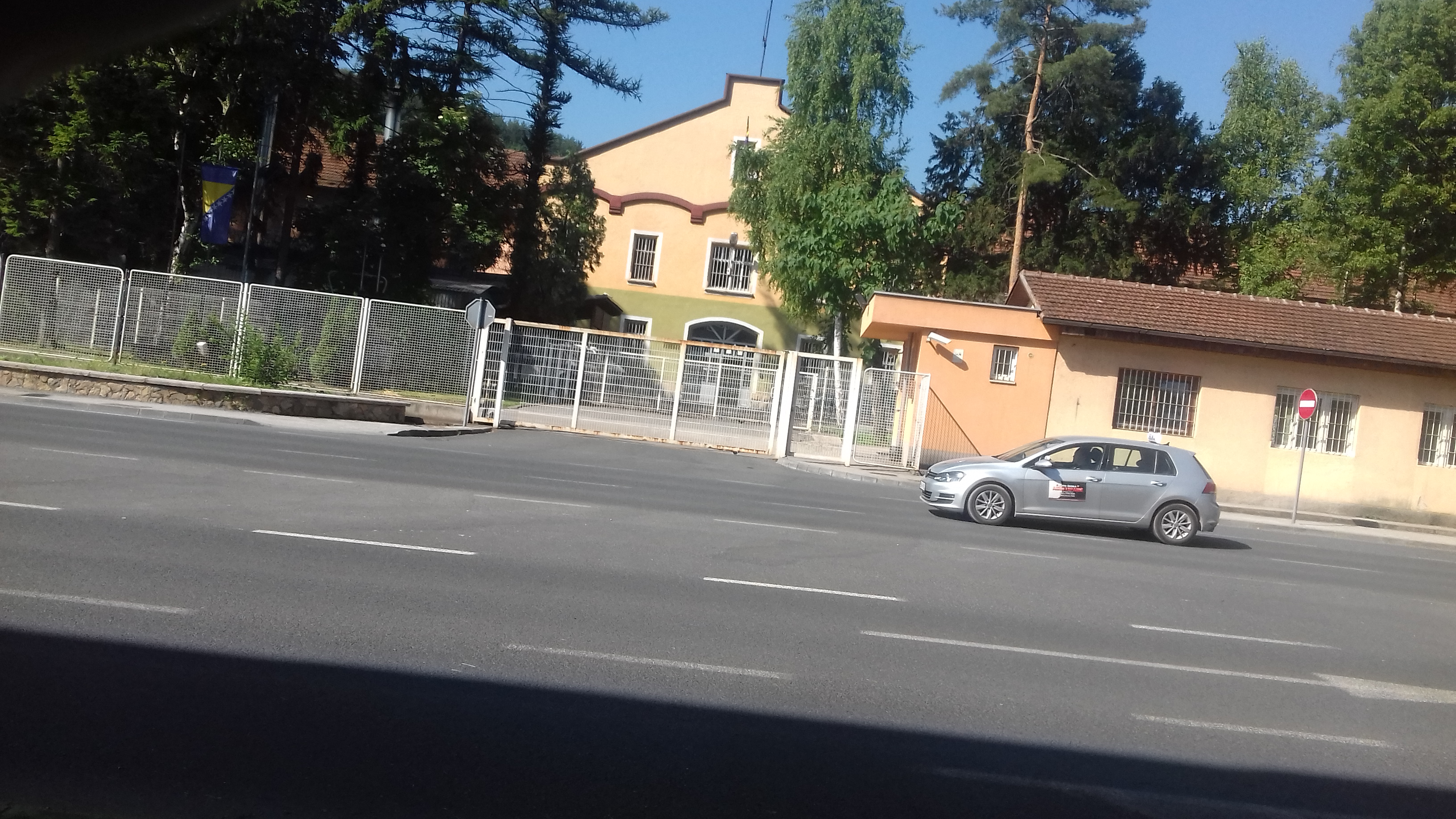
View on the main entrance of the KPD Zenica

The Zenica prison (Kazneno-popravni zavod zatvorenog tipa Zenica, KPZ Zenica, K.P. DOM, Zenička kaznionica) is a closed-type prison located in Zenica, Bosnia and Herzegovina. It was opened in 1886. It was the largest prison in Yugoslavia during its existence, and is currently the largest prison in Bosnia and Herzegovina.

As of 2016, the prison had a capacity of 813 inmates.

== Inmates ==
=== Austria-Hungary (1886–1918) ===
- Ivo Andrić – Nobel Prize for Literature winner
- Gavrilo Princip, Nedeljko Čabrinović, Muhamed Mehmedbašić, Vaso Čubrilović – collaborators in the assassination of Archduke Franz Ferdinand of Austria

=== SFR Yugoslavia (1945–1992) ===
- Petar Čule – Catholic bishop
- Varnava Nastić – Serbian Orthodox bishop and saint
- Vojislav Šešelj – Serbian politician
- Alija Izetbegović – Bosnian politician
- Ipe Ivandić – Yugoslav musician

=== Yugoslav wars and today ===
- Jackie Arklöv – a Swedish neo-Nazi mercenary who fought for the Croatian Defence Council; spent one year of eight-year sentence for war crimes at the Zenica prison before being released to Sweden
- Jerko Ivanković Lijanović – Bosnian politician and businessman sentenced in 2020 to seven years for abuse of office
- Munib "Munja" Ušanović – former official of the Bosnian Football Association, sentenced to 5 years in 2012.

== In popular culture ==
- KPD Zenica prison is featured in season 6 of the Netflix series Inside the World's Toughest Prisons
- KPD Zenica prison is mentioned in a song "Zenica blues" by Bosnian band Zabranjeno pušenje
- KPD Zenica prison is mentioned in a song "K.P. Dom" by Bosnian Band Dubioza Kolektiv
- KPD Zenica prison is mentioned in a song "Zenica" by Bosnian singer DJ Krmak (Crmac)
- KPD Zenica prison is mentioned in a song "KPD Zenica" by Bosnian root music group Raspjevane Meraklije
