= Zoran Kalezić =

Montenegrin singer (1950–2023)

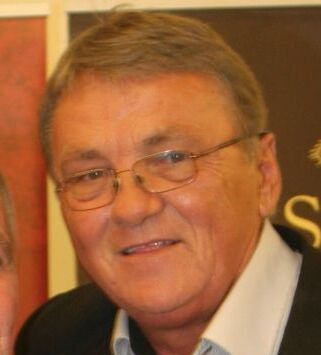

Background information
- Born: 1 February 1950; Danilovgrad, PR Montenegro, FPR Yugoslavia
- Died: 4 January 2023 (aged 72)
- Genre: Folk music
- Occupation: Singer-songwriter
- Years active: 1969–2023

Zoran Kalezić (Cyrillic: Зоран Калезић; 1 February 1950 – 4 January 2023) was a Montenegrin singer.

== Early life ==
Zoran Kalezić was born on 1 February 1950 in Danilovgrad to journalist Dragiša Kalezić and housewife Mileva. He graduated from the Administrative School in Danilovgrad, before entering into the music industry in 1969.

== Career and awards ==
Kalezić was awarded 1st place at the Pop Song Festival in Montenegro in 1971, 1st place at the 1977 Ilidža Folk Music Festival, as well as numerous awards at the 1990 MESAM.

Kalezić had a prolific career, organizing concerts in the Dom Sindikata building in 1983 and in the Vuk Karadžić Cultural Center in 1992. In 1993, he became President of the Association of Folk Artists of Belgrade.

In September 2016, Kalezić held a concert in Belgrade's Štark Arena to commemorate the death of Toma Zdravković, fellow folk singer and Kalezić's best man who had died 25 years earlier. The concert was attended by Toma's brother Novica Zdravković, singer Halid Bešlić and others.

== Personal life and death ==
Kalezić died on 4 January 2023, at the age of 72.

== Discography ==
- Uspomene (1969)
- Moj život je tužna priča (1970)
- Vratiću se majko (1973)
- Kako da te zovem, srećo ili tugo (1974)
- Smiri se, srce, smiri (1975)
- Moj jarane (1976)
- Sto puteva i sto staza (1978)
- Svako svome ja nemam nikome (1978)
- Stari druže, prijatelju mom (1979)
- Kako je lepo u mom kraju (1980)
- Dobro veče izgubljena nado (1982)
- Stan' mladosti, stani (1985)
- Ne točite vina (1987)
- Moj dobri andjele (1990)
- Balkanska dusa (1991)
- Karta za nebo (1994)
- Za vašu i moju dusu (1996)
- Živim od sećanja (1999)
- Kotrlja se život (2002)
- Album 2007 (2007)

=== Hit singles ===
- Zbog đevojke Crnogorske (1971)
- Čekaj me (1972)

=== Compilations ===
- Jednoj žene koje nema više (1988)
- Folk zvijezde zauvijek (2008) – best of
- 50 Orginalnih hitova (2020)
