= Živa voda =

Studio album by Drina
- Released: 2000
- Genre: World, Music of Serbia, Music of Bosnia and Herzegovina, Music of Croatia, Music of Macedonia, Music of Montenegro
- Label: “Radio Svetigora”, Cetinje

Živa voda (Serbian Cyrillic: "Жива вода"; English: "The Living Water") is an album of traditional Serbian songs by the Belgrade group Drina, which accounted for Svetlana Spajić and Minja Nikolić. In the form of a CD it was published by Radio Svetigora from Cetinje, 2000.

The album received very favorable reviews in professional and scientific circles, and Drina was assessed as one of the most successful Serbian traditional music groups. Even after termination of the duo, singers continued cooperation in the Singing Company of Svetlana Spajić.

== Track listing ==
1. Se navali Šar planina (2:33), shepherd's song, region of Šar-planina, Old Serbia
2. Soko pije voda na Vardarot (2:06), Macedonia
3. Red se redat kočanski sejmeni (1:54), Macedonia
4. Gusta mi magla padnala (1:57), Kosovo
5. Zamuči se Božja majka (2:59), Christmas song, village Vukmanovo, South-Eastern Serbia
6. Problejalo mlado jagnje (3:31), shepherd's song 'per bass', village Lasovo, near Zaječar, Eastern Serbia, after singing of Bokan Stanković
7. Tupan mi tupa u selo (1:58), Easter (Veligdenska) song 'per bass', village Vidrovac, near Negotin, North-Eastern Serbia
8. Poranile dve devojke mlade (2:38), harvester's song 'per bass', village Seselac, Eastern Serbia
9. Bela vilo na tebe mi krivo (1:55), 'per bass', village Milatovac, Homolje, Eastern Serbia, after singing of Svetlana Stević
10. Oj, jabuko zeleniko (3:38), ancient wedding song, village Gračanica, Kosovo
11. Ozren goro, povi brdu grane (2:56), song by wedding guest voice, region Ozren mountain, Eastern Bosnia
12. Drinu vodu zatrovale vile (1:04), kantalica, village Culine, Serbian side Drina region
13. Kad se sejo udamo ja i ti (1:23), kantalica, village Donja Pilica, Bosnian side Drina region
14. Zaspala Joka Bogutovka (2:05), 'per voice', village Rastošnica, Bosnian side Drina region
15. Što Morava mutna teče (1:18), kantalica, village Donja Badanja, Jadar, Serbian side Drina region
16. Stojna moma brazdu kopa (2:01), diggers' song, village Gračanica, Kosovo
17. Krajiška kontra (3:31), singing in kolo (circle), Potkozarje, Bosanska Krajina
18. Nema raja bez rodnoga kraja (2:09), 'per bass', Kninska Krajina
19. Gde si bilo jare moje (3:40), shepherd's song, Vranje, South-Eastern Serbia, after singing of Maja Ivanović
20. Drino vodo, žubora ti tvoga (1:34), traditional, Drina, krajiško ojkanje, Kninska Krajina

== Publication data ==
- Publisher: Radio Svetigora, Cetinje
- Performers: Svetlana Spajić (leading voice and solo) and Minja Nikolić (back voice).
- Foreword: Jovan (Ćulibrk) (then monk)
- Recorded in Boris Kovač studio in Bukovac, February 12–14, 2000, except the tracks 14 and 15, which were recorded in Loznica, November 1999.
- Ton master: Mare Vukmanović
- Producer: Boris Kovač
- Mastering: Vladimir Žeželj
- Photography: Miroslav Zaklan (Drina) and Milinko Stefanović
- Makeup: Nataša Bošković
- Design: Rade Tovladijac and Zoran Tucić
- Text in Serbian and English and translation: Svetlana Spajić

== Critical reception ==
At the end of a detailed and favorable album review, esteemed ethnomusicologist and music artist Jelena Jovanović concludes:

Active, conscious and courageous attitude of the young singer /Svetlana Spajić/ towards the traditional singing expresses complete, essential commitment to the work, worthy of respect. Before us is an interesting personality who with her interpretations delivers a valuable contribution to the renewal of Serbian traditional rural singing in the pursuit of personal and ethnic identity. Unusual and theoretically challenging is her readiness to come forward with statements and views on certain phenomena in our folklore. It remains to wish her, in the future work with her high-quality singing, to continue to amaze our ethnomusicologists and sometimes give them headaches with her irreconcilable standpoints.

— Jelena Jovanović, PHD, ethnomusicologist (2000)
