= Jerko Ivanković Lijanović =

Bosnian Croat politician (born 1969)

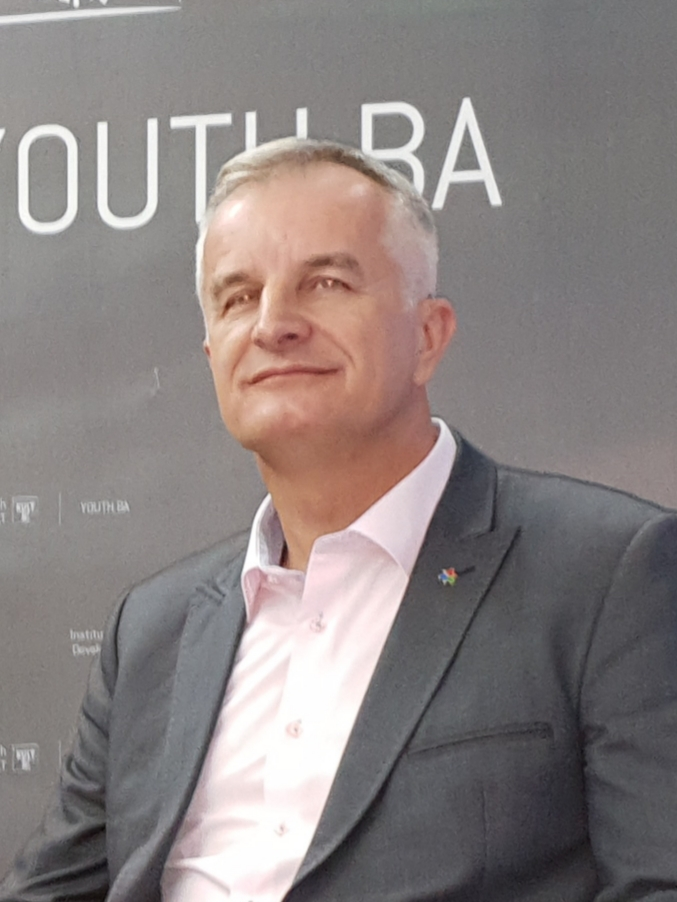

Federal Minister of Agriculture, Aquaculture and Forestry
- In office 17 March 2011 – 31 March 2015
- Prime Minister: Nermin Nikšić
- Preceded by: Damir Ljubić
- Succeeded by: Šemsudin Dedić

Personal details
- Born: 15 November 1969 (age 56) Široki Brijeg, SR Bosnia and Herzegovina, SFR Yugoslavia
- Party: People's Party Work for Prosperity

Jerko Ivanković Lijanović (born 15 November 1969) is a Bosnian Croat businessman and politician. He is a member of the People's Party Work for Prosperity, and has served as Federal Minister of Agriculture, Aquaculture and Forestry from 2011 to 2015.

Since September 2020, Lijanović has been serving a 7-year sentence for abuse of office in the Zenica prison.

== Personal life ==
Ivanković was born in Široki Brijeg in 1969. His nickname Lijanović came from his father Stipe Ivanković Lijan. In Sarajevo he went to the Agricultural-Food School. He started his career in his family's firm Lijanovići d.o.o., of which he still holds 66 percent of the shares.

Lijanović is married and has three children.

== Political career ==
Lijanović is the Vice president of the People's Party Work for Prosperity, which was founded by his brother Mladen. In 2000, he was elected member of the Federal House of Peoples. At the 2006 general election, Lijanović was elected to the national House of Representatives. In 2010, he ran as a candidate for the office of Croat member of the Presidency of Bosnia and Herzegovina, but won only 8% of the vote.

In 2011, Lijanović's party went into a coalition with the Social Democratic Party of Bosnia and Herzegovina, and he was appointed Federal Minister of Agriculture, Aquaculture and Forestry in the Federal government of Nermin Nikšić. Lijanović served as minister until March 2015.

In 2014, he ran again for the Bosnian parliament but did not garner enough votes. Lijanović ran again for the Presidency at the 2018 general election, but only won 1% of the vote.

== Judicial proceedings and sentence ==
Lijanović was arrested in 2014 together with his three brothers and father for organised crime, money laundering, tax evasion and for fabricating or destroying his financial records.

In 2018, he was sentenced to nine years in prison.

In October 2019, the Federal Supreme Court confirmed his conviction for abuse of office with illegalities in awarding incentives to agricultural producers in Tuzla Canton from 2011 until 2014, and ordered confiscation of the unlawful proceeds in the amount of BAM 650,000.

On 29 September 2020, Lijanović started to serve his seven-year sentence in the Zenica prison.
