= Svetlana Spajić =

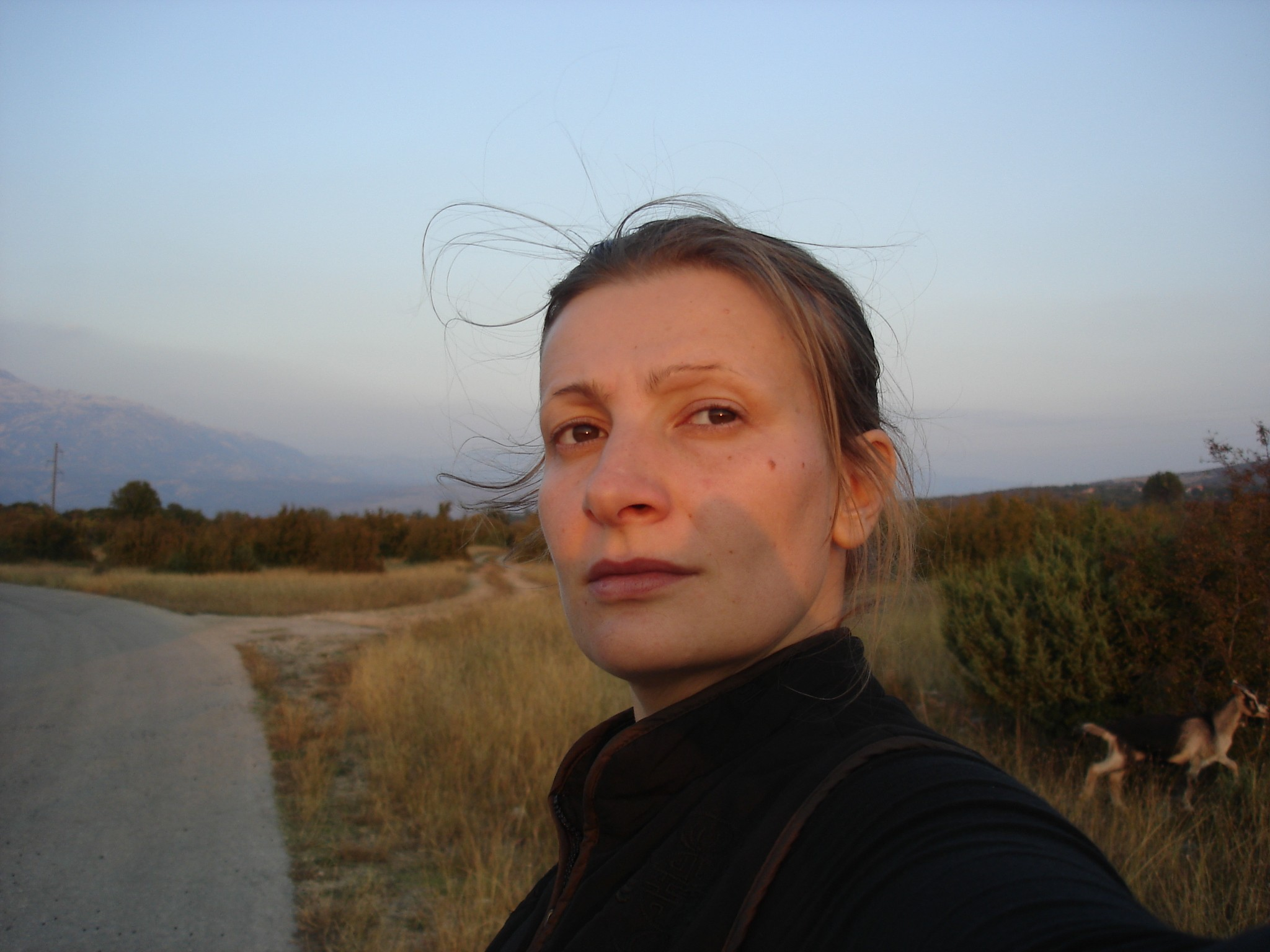

Background information
- Born: Svetlana Spajić; August 19, 1971 (age 54); Loznica, Serbia, SFR Yugoslavia
- Origin: Belgrade, Serbia
- Genres: traditional music, world music, alternative music
- Occupations: Singer, songwriter, composer
- Years active: 1993–present
- Labels: PGP RTS, Multimedia Music, Cloudvalley, WMAS, Karlrecords, Morphine Records
- Website: svetlanaspajic.com

Svetlana Spajić (Serbian Cyrillic: Светлана Спајић, born August 19, 1971, in Loznica, Serbia) is a Serbian traditional singer, performer, pedagogue, cultural activist and translator. Apart from performing Serbian traditional music, she is known for cooperation with artists like Marina Abramović and Robert Wilson.

She sang in groups "Paganke", "Moba", "Drina", "New Ritual Group", "Žegar živi", „Belo Platno", "Pjevačka družina Svetlane Spajić" (Svetlana Spajić Group) and other.

She is associate with International Cultural Network "Project Rastko" since its founding in 1997, "Radio Svetigora" and other cultural institutions. She had authored broadcasts dedicated to traditional culture.

== Education ==
She graduated from Philological Faculty in Belgrade (dept. of English and German Languages), as well as from International School for Holocaust Studies at the Institute Yad Vashem in Jerusalem, Israel.

== Career ==
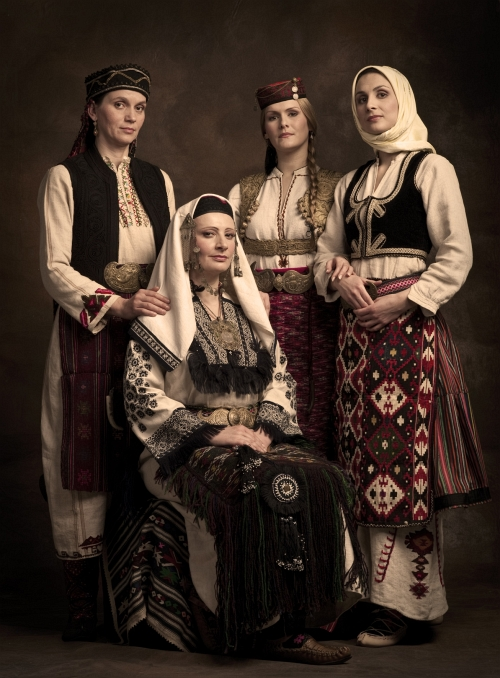
Svetlana Spajić Group

Since 1993, she is dedicated to fostering and preserving Serbian traditional culture, collecting and learning at the field, from source singers of the oldest generation. Her repertoire of Serbian archaic lore from all Serbian ethnic territories also covers the oldest traditional forms from Drina river region, like songs "na glas", "kantalica", "na bas".

Aged 24, in Thessaloníki she was selected, as the youngest member, into the elite Inter-Balkan traditional ensemble made from the best traditional artists of the Balkans (Thessaloníki, First Inter-Balkan Culture Festival, 1995).

She participated in both domestic and international music and theater projects, and performed with world-renowned vocal artists and musicians: Yanka Rupkina, Stella Chiweshe, Domna Samiou, Cherifa Kersit, Sainkho Namtchylak, "Balkan Beat Box", Antony Hegarty, William Basinski, Zeitkratzer, Dario Marušić...

Concerts and lectures, she held in prestigious concert halls, festivals and institutions: WOMAD, WOMEX, Concertgebouw (Amsterdam), Konzerthaus (Vienna), Teatro Real (Madrid), Dom (Moscow), Museum of Modern Art (New York), Yad Vashem (Jerusalem), Grotowski Institute (Wroclaw), Roskilde Festival, Museum of Contemporary Art (Los Angeles), Taipei National Concert Hall, Festival of World Sacred Music in Fes…...

She is artistic director RETNIK festival / platform founded by WMAS in 2015 for transmission of traditional heritage and knowledge through long-term meetings and interaction of the oldest and youngest traditional artists.

For many years she has been collaborating with the composer and instrumentalist Boris Kovač as a member of his chamber orchestra “New Ritual Group”.

She participates in projects of world famous artist Marina Abramović, and in 2011 she was engaged in the theater project "Life and Death of Marina Abramović" led by the eminent director Robert J. Wilson.

In 2020 Svetlana Spajic and musicians Guido Mobius and Andreas Stecher formed the band Gordan. She is also a member of Belgrade alternative group The Cyclist Conspiracy.

== Selected discography ==
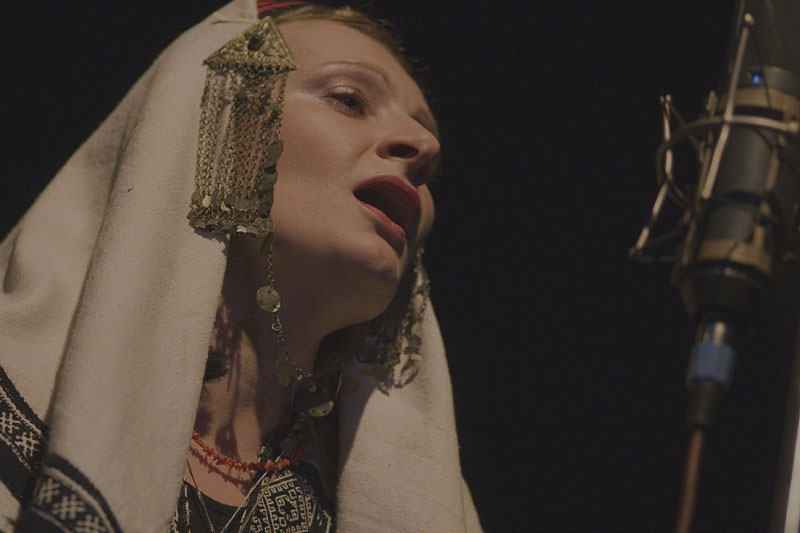

- Gordan. Down in the Meadow, Morphine Records, 2021.
- Pjevačka družina Svetlane Spajić. Igrali se konji vrani, „Multimedia Music", 2019
- Zeitkratzer, Svetlana Spajić, Dragana Tomić, Obrad Milić. Serbian War Songs, Karlrecords, 2017.
- Olga Krasojević i Pjevačka družina Svetlane Spajić. Sa Rudnika soko krila vije, tradicionalno pevanje iz sela Crnuća pod Rudnikom, WMAS Records, Beograd, 2014.
- Belo platno. Live in Russia 2012, DVD & CD, EtnoKuzn'a, Ribinsk, 2014.
- Svetlana Spajić & Bokan Stanković, Uživo sa festivala Todo Mundo: Tradicionalne pesme i svirke iz Istočne Srbije, „WMAS Records", Beograd, 2013.
- Pjevačka družina Svetlane Spajić, Siv sokole, „Multimedia Music", Beograd, 2013.
- Pod Ozrenom sviralica svira — srpska tradicija sa Ozrena (DVD), Kulturno umetničko društvo Ozren, Doboj, 2011.
- „Žegar živi", Žegar živi, „Cloudvalley", London, 2008.
- Svetlana Spajić i grupa „Belo platno". Kosovo i Metohija, lice Evrope, multimedijalni disk i audio disk sa muzikom, „Tipon", „TIA Janus", 2006. i „Svetigora", 2008.
- Various, Serbia Sounds Global, vol. 1, 2, 3, 4, kompilacije, (B92, 2000, 2002, 2004, 2008).
- „Extended Europe", Live in Vienna, Salon Elise – Vienna, 2002.
- Various, Pesme iznad istoka i zapada, PGP RTS, 2000.
- Grupa „Drina", Živa voda (tradicionalno srpsko pevanje), „Svetigora", 2000.
- Grupa „Moba". Prioni, mobo, „Biljeg", 1994.

== Guest on music albums ==
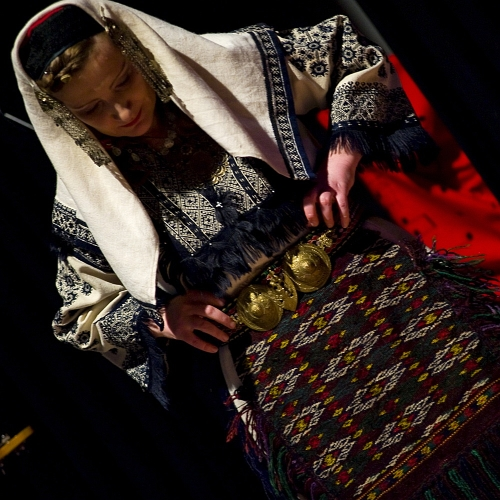

- Lenhart Tapes, Duets, Pop Depression, 2021.
- Boris Kovač, Catalogue of Memories, B92, 2011.
- Boris Kovač, Anamnesis, „Long Arms Records", Moscow, 2010.
- "Balkan Beat Box", Blue Eyed Black Boy, „Crammed", 2010.

== Theater shows (as the author of music and performer) ==
- The Life and Death of Marina Abramovic, director Robert J. Wilson, Manchester International Festival "Teatro Real", 2011/2012.
- Poslednja plovidba (The Last Sailing), režija Nebojša Bradić, Dunavski festival (Danube Festival), Beograd, 2011.
- Harta, "Wrong Movement Ensemble", Military Museum, Athens, 2008.

== Awards and prizes ==
- For her contribution to the preservation of tradition and spiritual treasure of Serbs from Krajina in 2010 she was awarded the highest award of the Krajina Serbs, the Ring of artistic brotherhood of the monastery Krka.
- The album Žegar živi ("Cloudvalley", London, 2008), she recorded with Serbs returnees to Dalmatia, was included in the world's top fifteen editions in 2008 in the "European World Music Charts", and has been rated one of the most important ethnomusicological endeavors in the last fifteen years in the territory of the former Yugoslavia.
- The first album of Gordan, Down in the meadow, was chosen by The Wire magazine among the top ten global music albums of 2021.
- Svetlana Spajić got a prestigious "Heroes of Heritage" award for 2024, from the Europa Nostra Serbia organization and the Delegation of the European Union, for her personal contribution to the preservation and promotion of Serbian cultural heritage.
