= Siv sokole =

Live album by Pjevačka družina Svetlane Spajić
- Released: 2012
- Genre: World, Music of Serbia, Music of Bosnia and Herzegovina, Music of Croatia, Music of Macedonia, Music of Montenegro
- Label: “Multimedia Music”, Belgrade

Siv Sokole (Serbian Cyrillic: "Сив соколе"; English: "Grey Falcon") is album of traditional Serbian songs by “Pjevačka družina Svetlane Spajić” (Singing Company of Svetlana Spajić). It was published as a CD by Belgrade publisher “Multimedia Music” in 2012.

On the album are published 21 oldest form songs of Serbian traditional singing — including “ojkalice” (the loud folk songs) from Dalmatia, “potresalice” (wedding shaking songs) from Bosanska Krajina, „ganga” from Herzegovina, “kajda” from Zlatibor, “kantalice” from Podrinje and ancient ballads from Kosovo and Metohija and Eastern Serbia — performed by Svetlana Spajić, Dragana Tomić, Minja Nikolić, Jovana Lukić and Zorana Bantić.

Being an important cultural event, an all evening concert from Radio Belgrade's Studio 6, which promoted the album on March 27, 2013, was broadcast live by the Third Program of Radio Belgrade and TV channel RTS Digital.

This edition was pronounced the best world music album in Serbia for 2012, by the choice of the “Disco 3000” show of Radio B92.

== Track listing ==
1. Golubice bjela
2. Siv sokole
3. Četiri gange
4. Prioni, mobo, za lada
5. Polegla je belija pšenica
6. Oj, jabuko zeleniko
7. Valila se vala
8. Kukaj, kukaj, crna kukavice
9. Ova brda i puste doline
10. Što Morava mutna teče
11. Sine mio, gde si sinoć bio
12. Ja urani jutros rano
13. Što me iska svaka neprilika
14. Zakošena zelena livada
15. Oženi se od donjega grada
16. Udaću se đe ću biti sama
17. Karanfil se na put sprema
18. Robstvo Janković Stevana
19. Oj Krajino, moja mila mati
20. Kićeno nebo zvezdama
21. Bjela Golubica

== Critical reception ==
“Siv sokole” is a collection of 20 songs from Serbia, Croatia, Bosnia and Herzegovina (Kosovo and Metochy, Banija, Dalmatia, Lika) which in full splendor use the abundance of five trained voices which effortlessly transfer from one style to another, from one geographical and mental into another geographical and mental space, exhibiting the astounding span of techniques and also astounding actuality of traditional forms and themes.

— Uroš Smiljanić, 2013.

Straight from the big international music scenes like Concertgebouw in Amsterdam, Konzerthaus in Vienna, the Teatro Real in Madrid, institutions such as the Museum of Modern Art in New York, the Museum Yad Vashem in Jerusalem, the Museum of Contemporary Art in Los Angeles, and in recent years also the play “Life and death of Marina Abramović” by Bob Wilson; “Pjevačka družina” comes back to home audience in Studio 6.

— Radio Serbia, announcement for the promotion of album Siv sokole, 2013.

== Awards and prizes ==
- Best world music album in Serbia for 2012. by the choice of the “Disco 3000” show of Radio B92.
