= Bulgarian jazz =

Music scene in Bulgaria

The history and development of jazz in Bulgaria was significantly influenced by the cultural and political changes in the country during the 20th century, which led to the emergence of a genre blending western jazz styles with Bulgarian folk music influences.

== History ==
=== Early Bulgarian jazz ===
After the bloody Ilinden-Preobrazhenie Uprising of 1903 there was a wave of Bulgarian immigrants to the US and Canada, mostly in the Eastern states, setting in communities that established their own social institutions - churches, political clubs, newspapers, and other societies, among which amateur orchestras had an important role. They were predominantly brass bands, though there were some string (guitar and mandolin) orchestras. Most of the musicians could not read music. Returning to Bulgaria as volunteers in the Balkan Wars of 1912 and 1913, they brought back the new music of America. One of the early first-hand experiences of music influenced by jazz was Wallace Hartley’s band concert in Varna in 1911. His success there acquired him a position at a club in the capital Sofia, where he played primarily dance music until being hired to play on the Titanic in 1912. His influence marks the beginning of the influx of western music, at that time predominantly ragtime, in Bulgaria. As early as the 1920s there was Bulgarian instrumental music that could be classified as jazz but was also influenced by folk traditions, often even in the choice of instrumentation.

=== Between the wars ===
In the years following the First World War there was an increased demand for entertainment, as well as a second big wave of returning emigrants from the Great Depression. Many of them decided to take up music as their profession, bringing to Bulgaria some experience and repertoire of American music. Those were years of increased industrialization and urbanization for Bulgaria, which also stimulated the growth of the entertainment industry. The first big jazz formations appeared at a time when public houses flourished and silent cinema provided work for orchestras. Jazz spread further with the import of notated western jazz music and records. There were several active jazz orchestras, performing mostly swing music, such as “Jazz Ovcharov” and “The Optimists”.

=== Jazz under communism ===
After the Second World War, as People's Republic of Bulgaria was established as a Marxist-Leninist single-party state, music and all art was subjected to a set of criteria that was not compatible with the free nature of jazz, nor with the rawness of improvised instrumental folk music that could naturally fit within the jazz aesthetic. In the aesthetic set by the government, folklore was only acceptable as an inspiration that after undergoing the process of refinement in the European style could become part of creating the “national musical style.” The totalitarian rule resulted in a relative artistic stagnation in which amusement and musical experimentation were frowned upon. During that period emerged one of the first prominent figures in Bulgarian jazz, Milcho Leviev, a composer, conductor, arranger, and piano player, whose career started with directing and occasionally composing and arranging for the Bulgarian radio and television big band between 1962 and 1966. Due to his personal connections (most notably with his teacher from the conservatory, classical composer Pancho Vladigerov) and other fortunate circumstances, Leviev was able to overcome some of the aesthetic conservatism. He found folk music tradition, with the asymmetrical complex rhythms, distinctive melodic motifs, and emphasis on virtuosity and improvisation typical for Bulgarian music, to be a logical choice to translate into jazz. One of the first compositions exploring that direction is his piece Blues in 9, based on a Bulgarian folk dance rhythm pattern and turning the familiar structures from both folk and jazz into something completely different. For him using asymmetric Bulgarian meters and the unusual melodic intervals typical to Bulgarian folk music was not just an attempt to towards the unusual, but aiming to evoke specific associations of those popular metric structures. His style also marked the first steps towards blending extremities in musical classification - rough folk and refined classical, serious art music and entertainment music, composer’s and performer’s music. Leviev’s music was a criticism of the totalitarian regime and its conservative aesthetic and with that he attracted like-minded musicians and other artists that he collaborated with, including the famous poet Radoy Ralin, who encouraged him to form the Bulgarian Jazz Quartet. Also known as Jazz Focus ‘65, the quartet consisted of Milcho Leviev on piano, Simeon Shterev on flute, Lyubomir Mitsov on contrabass, and Petur Slavov on percussion. The group gained some international acclaim after winning the critics' award in the jazz festival in Montreux, Switzerland. Despite its success abroad, the music of the quartet was not in favour in Bulgaria, where on occasion it had been banned as “politically inappropriate.” In 1968 the quartet recorded an album beyond the Iron Curtain in FRG, free of the aesthetic restraints of communism. In the same year he contacted the American bandleader Don Ellis, sending him recordings of Bulgarian folk music, including Sadovsko horo, a folk dance tune in 33/16, which Ellis rearranged and released under the title “Bulgarian Bulge.” This resulted in a yearlong collaboration between Leviev and Ellis, during which Leviev moved to the US to compose, arrange, and play piano for Ellis’ band.

One of the most significant Bulgarian jazz singers is Lea Ivanova. Between 1940 and 1955 she sang for various big bands including "Slavyanska beseda," "Jazz Ovcharov," and "The Optimists," singing predominantly in the style of swing. The beginning of the 1950s marks a difficult time for jazz bands and she was forced to change situation more often, gaining fame as a singer for various orchestras in the capital. 1957 marks the beginning of her 30-year-long partnership with Edi Kazasyan, who later became her husband. Singing for his orchestra, she toured Europe extensively, becoming popular outside Bulgaria. During the totalitarian regime, there was a ban on her music in Bulgaria. Because of artistic censorship she was also imprisoned and put in a labor camp. After being released she suffered a stroke and was not able to sing almost until the end of her life, though she was able to recover her ability to speak. Later in her life she received some recognition for her contributions to Bulgarian jazz.

=== Wedding music and its influence on Bulgarian jazz ===
Bulgarian village weddings were traditionally accompanied by music performed by the villagers, often singing and playing along with the gypsies. After the Second World War, professional wedding bands started being employed. The folk instruments traditionally used by those orchestras were increasingly western brass and woodwind instruments, associated with jazz. Professional wedding bands that blended Bulgarian folk and gypsy music with the inevitable western influences became increasingly popular in the '80s. Though not in itself strictly jazz music their music was similar with its syncretism, improvisatory character, and reiteration of old well-known melodies into something new. That tradition gave rise to several influential musicians who set out to use their traditional folk instruments playing contemporary jazz that blended the western music with Balkan influences such as the unusual timbres, complex, and often asymmetrical meters, unusual for western music melodies and often passionate aggressive style of playing. Bulgarian clarinetist Ivo Papazov and his band do not deviate too much from the wedding band music style, though they are active performers at jazz festivals as well as the countryside. They have recorded several albums which have been received well internationally. Blending jazz and folk music is only successful when the player has a good familiarity with both styles. One of the leading musicians of that style is Teodosii Spassov, whose initial interest in music was sparked by a folk music player in his native village. His unique sound in playing kaval has been compared to the sound of a flute, clarinet, and oboe. He is also the first to play the folk instrument with a symphonic orchestra and a big band. Its development was encouraged by the Western interest for the characteristic folk music of regional cultures. While during the communist regime folk music influences were considered a bad direction of development, the post-communist musicians were able to discern its potential for connecting with the people on a spiritual level, calling to mind tradition and connection with symbols of nature and community. In that sense Teodosii Spassov's music, as well as the other jazz musicians relying heavily on folklore instrumentation and musical elements are continuing the trend started by Milcho Leviev in the early 1960s. Teodosii Spassov has received international acclaim for his musicianship and versatility as a performer and numerous composition awards.

=== Jazz festivals after 1989 ===
By the end of the 1980s there was a noticeable difference in the artistic freedom that musicians could afford to have, and this was especially important for jazz music. As the recording industry in the country was fairly insignificant, the music industry was focused on concerts and festivals. Since the 1990s the development and popularity of Bulgarian jazz can be best tracked by following jazz festivals, especially since many of them have a consistent style and recurring performers from year to year.

The festival "Varna Summer" was initiated in 1992 and is the oldest jazz festival created after 1989 that is still active. It was first held under the direction of Anatoli Vapirov, a classically trained jazz clarinetist, saxophonist and conductor. The music at the "Varna Summer" jazz festival is characterized by virtuosity, experimentation, and variety.

One of the Haskovo jazz festival's main supporters is the jazz guitar player, Dimitar Roussev. The festival is designed to attract visitors to Haskovo, even international guests. The audience is barely enough to support the festival, however. Organizers often rely on donations from local companies. This is the reason why they rely on the same popular performers and cannot afford to include more experimental music in their program. The Jazz Festival in Bansko is the most popular one, partially because the mountain town is a tourist attraction in itself. In the year 2012 there were more than 28,000 guests present.

The festival "Plovdiv Jazz Evenings" is financed by the Plovdiv township. This allows the festival to feature a wide variety of Bulgarian and international performers, which has gained the event a lot of popularity for its short history.

The capital of Bulgaria, Sofia, is known to have two jazz festivals. Both of them consist of individual concert events rather than being an actual festival. Both of them are relatively open to performers from styles other than jazz.

== See also ==
- Balkan jazz
- Jazz FM Bulgaria
