= Balkan jazz =

Music genre

Balkan jazz is an umbrella term for jazz from different parts of the Balkan Peninsula in southeastern Europe. Jazz in the region may incorporate various types of Balkan music, especially folk musics (including "gypsy style"). It has embraced improvisation and originality, much like jazz traditions in the Americas and elsewhere. Characteristic features can include use of unusual meters ("odd rhythms"), sometimes played very fast. There are many venues for Balkan jazz, which is also frequently played at weddings and big celebrations. The clarinet is often a key instrument in keeping with folk music traditions, and the accordion, drum, bass and electric guitar are also widely used.

Pioneers of Balkan jazz in Europe include Duško Gojković (English spelling Dushko Goykovich) from Serbia, Milcho Leviev, Martin Lubenov and Anatoly Vapirov from Bulgaria, or Adrian Gaspar from Romania.

== See also ==
- Ethno jazz
- Gypsy jazz
- Klezmer
- Music of Albania
- Music of Bosnia and Herzegovina
- Music of Greece
- Music of Montenegro
- Music of North Macedonia
- Music of Thrace
- Romani music
