= Prioni, mobo =

Studio album by Moba ensemble
- Released: 1994
- Genre: World, Music of Serbia, Music of Bosnia and Herzegovina, Music of Croatia, Music of Macedonia, Music of Montenegro
- Label: “Biljeg”, Beograd

“Prioni, mobo: srpske izvorne pesme” (Serbian Cyrillic: "Приони, мобо: српске изворне песме"; English: "Come on, harvest elhelpers: Serbian traditional songs") is the debut album from Moba. It was released on cassette by Belgrade lab “Biljeg - balkansko i slovensko izdavaštvo” in 1994.

Contributors to the album include Jelena Jovanović, Svetlana Spajić, Aleksandra Pavićević, Sanja Stanković, Sanja Radinović and Zvezdana Milović, in cooperation with Darko Macura, as mentor and co-producer.

== Track listing ==
Side A

1. Mobu zove Jovo momče mlado (2,05), harvesters', “per bass”, Ribaševina near Užice
2. Prioni, mobo, za lada (2,30), harvesters', Ribaševina near Užice
3. Lepo pevam, daleko se čuje (2,00)
4. Tri devojke zbor zborile (2,00), Seča Reka near Užice
5. Oj devojko, kolasta jabuko (1,20)
6. Čuvam ovce u livadi dole (4,20), shepherds', Jarmenovci near Topole
7. Ja posadi vitu jelu (3,15)
8. Izvor voda izvirala, ladna ledena (2,05), harvesters', “per voice”, Crnuća by Rudnik mountain
9. Devojčica cveće brala pa je zaspala (2,00), harvesters', “per voice”, Valjevska Podgorina

Side B

1. Smilj devojka pokraj gore brala (2,55), slavska, from Čerovnica near Kosovska Mitrovica
2. Oj devojče, često li me sanjaš? (1,50)
3. Zaspala Joka Bogutovka (2,20), “per voice”, Rastošnica, Drina region
4. Kraj bunara zeleni se trava (1,50), “per bass”, Ribaševina near Užice
5. Šta se sjaji ju goru zelenu (1,40), wedding song, around Sokobanja
6. Janko prosi ju dalek devojku (2,45), Rujište near Boljevac
7. Đevojko ružo rumena (1,05), wedding song, Ribaševina near Užice
8. Nišnu se zvezda (3,55), from Manjak near Vranje
9. Kićeno nebo zvezdama (3,30)

== Credits ==
=== Performers ===
- Jelena Jovanović (А6, B1, B7, follows in А9, B6)
- Svetlana Spajić (A1, A2, A3, A9, B3, follows in A8, B5)
- Aleksandra Pavićević (A4, A5, follows in A8, B3, B7)
- Sanja Stanković (A2, B4, B5, B6, B8)
- Sanja Radinović (A7, B9,)
- Zvezdana Milović (A8, B2)

=== Colophon ===
- Publisher: “Biljeg – Balkansko i slovensko izdavaštvo”, Belgrade, 1993 (AK-003)
- Recorded in studio “Akademija”, Belgrade, April 1994
- Production: “Moba” and Darko Macura
- Recording: Goran Živković
- Photography: Milinko Stefanović
- Design: Boban Knežević
- Recension: Bojan Žikić
- Director: Milinko Stefanović
- Editor-in-chief: Zoran Stefanović

== Literature ==
- Matović, Jelena. „'Prioni mobo', kaseta izvornih srpskih pesama u izvođenju ženskog ansambla 'Moba'“ - A review, in: Zbornik Matice srpske za scenske umetnosti i muziku, 16–17, Novi Sad 1995, 280–281.
- Muršič, Rajko. „Darko Macura: Prizivanja, Srpski duvački instrumenti (Biljeg 1994) • Moba: Prioni, Mobo, Izvorne srpske pesme Biljeg, 1994)“, Glasbena mladina, letnik 26, številka 5, Marec 1996, str. 30.
- Jovanović, Jelena. „The Power of Recently Revitalized Serbian Rural Folk Music in Urban Settings“, in: Music, Power, and Politics, ed. by Annie J. Randall, Routledge, 2004. p. 137.
