= Branimir Đokić =

- Born: Branimir Đokić; 6 February 1950 (age 75); Šabac, FPR Yugoslavia (present-day Serbia)
- Genres: Folk
- Occupation: Musician
- Years active: 1965-present
- Labels: PGP, Diskos, Diskoton, Jugoton, Balkanton

Branimir Đokić (Serbian Cyrillic: Бранимир Ђокић) (born 6 February 1950) is a Serbian folk accordionist. He has had his own ensemble band since the early 1970s and has also been known to have played for some major artists: Šaban Šaulić, Mitar Mirić, Šerif Konjević, Kemal Malovčić, Zorica Brunclik and others.

He led the Radio Television of Serbia Folk Ensemble for 35 years after it was founded in 1980.

Đokić attended the high music school "Stanković" in Belgrade. He presented himself to the audience as outstanding instrumentalist on accordion, winning the first prize at the traditional competition in Sokobanja, 1964. Within a year, he became one of the best known instrumental soloists on accordion in the former Yugoslavia.

Later, he joined the Folk Orchestra of Radio Belgrade, where he was oriented in the field, in which he is today, by Rade Jašarević and Boki Milošević.

== Discography ==
Singles

- Kola (Kaletovo kolo) - PGP RTB (1965)
- Kola (Čubursko kolo) - PGP RTB (1966)
- Kola (Uzičko kolo) - PGP RTB (1967)
- Kola (Ciganski urnebes) - BeogradDisk (1968)
- Nova kola (Čivijaški džumbus) - PGP RTB (1970)
- Nova kola (Zvezdino kolo) - PGP RTB (1975)
- Kola (Mitraljez kolo) - PGP RTB (1977)

Albums

- Zlatna harmonika (Kola) - PGP RTB (1972)
- Kola (Kola) - PGP RTB (1973)
- Kola (Kola) - PGP RTB (1976)
- Veliki uspesi (Kola) - Diskos (1984)
