= Uživo sa festivala Todo Mundo =

Live from festival Todo Mundo

Live album by Svetlana Spajić and Bokan Stanković
- Released: 20 August 2013
- Genre: World, Serbian
- Length: 69:13
- Label: “Multimedia Music”, Belgrade

"Uživo sa festivala Todo Mundo" (Serbian Cyrillic: "Уживо са фестивала Тодо Мундо"; English: "Live from festival Todo Mundo") is album with traditional songs and music from Eastern Serbia performed by Svetlana Spajić and Bokan Stanković.

It includes a recording of a whole-evening performance at the Todo Mundo festival in Dom Omladine in Belgrade, March 23, 2013. It was published the same year on a CD by Belgrade publisher “Multimedia Music”.

The edition was included on the Top 10 list of best domestic world music albums in 2013, by the choice of “Disco 3000” show of Radio B92.

== Track listing ==
1. Oro pade u livade
2. Problejalo mlado jagnje
3. Zapeli se dva slaveja
4. Lagala Dana Davina
5. Pošle mome rose da obiju
6. Nano, boli me glava
7. Čobanska vlaška pesma
8. Stojan ide od oranje
9. Sviri deda u duduk
10. Dobro jutro, žuta žabo
11. Zelen goro, ne laduj devojko
12. Jova Ružu kroz sviralu zove
13. Raste bagrem do neba
14. Čobanska svirka
15. Po moru je plovila galija
16. Službu služi Viden dobar junak
17. Oj, ti pile sa šarena krila
18. Kiša pada, putnici putuju
19. Gorom pjeva mladi Radivoje

== Critical reception ==
Master of several wind instruments (besides pipes he played quite a few mighty miniatures on flute), Stanković spends most of his time accompanying Svetlana as a second voice and his performing dozens of songs 'per bass' is, as usually, fascinating. This music is so reduced, with two voices performing at one time attuned, and the other time fractious melody lines, while harmony struggles with its evil twin from hell, so one cannot believe his eyes that there are only two human figures on the stage. What one hears – the orchestra of spirits and elements – is too transcendent to fit into words.

— Uroš Smiljanić, 2013.

== Awards and prizes ==
- Third place on the Top 10 list “The best world music album in Serbia for 2013”, by the choice of “Disco 3000” show of Radio B92.
