= Cherifa Kersit =

Moroccan singer in the genre of Tamawayt (born 1967)

Cherifa Kersit شريفة كيرسيت
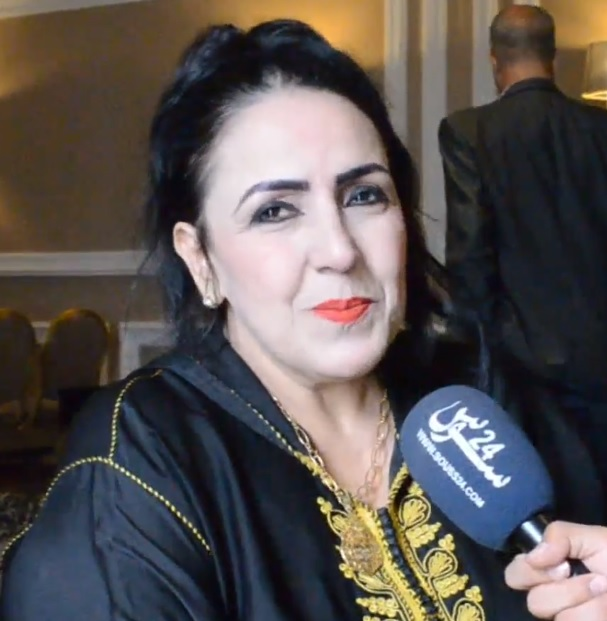
- Cherifa Kersit in Agadir in 2019.

Background information
- Born: Cherifa Kersit; 1 January 1967 (age 59); Tazrout M'oukhbou, Khenifra, Morocco
- Genres: Tamawayt
- Occupations: Singer, musician

Cherifa Kersit (Arabic: شريفة كيرسيت; born 1 January 1967) is a Moroccan singer in the genre of Tamawayt. Cherifa sings in Central Atlas Tamazight.

== Biography ==
Cherifa was born in Tazrout M'oukhbou, in the region of Khenifra in the Middle Atlas mountains of Morocco, in a family of 16 children. Like the girls of her age in the region, she never went to school and spent her days in daily duties in the countryside, where she learned traditional singing. Cherifa started to sing professionally against the will of her family, and has performed with well-known artists such as Mohamed Rouicha and Mohamed Maghni. In 1999, Cherifa made her first visit to France, where she participated in the show "Dances and song by the Woman of Morocco, from dawn to dusk". In 2002, she released her first album Berber Blues.

== Discography ==
=== 2002 ===
==== Berber Blues ====
- Idhrdh Umalu Z Iâari
- Maysh Yiwin May Tshawrth?
- Ndda S Adbib Nnani
- Ma Gn Tufit Amazir?
- Isul Isul Umarg Nsh Awadigi
- Tahidust: Wllah Ar Thagh Lafiyt G Ul Usmun
