= Mitar Mirić =

Bosnian pop-folk singer (born 1957)

- Born: Mitar Mirić; 16 January 1957 (age 69); Ugljevik, PR Bosnia and Herzegovina, Yugoslavia
- Genres: pop-folk, folk
- Occupation: Singer
- Years active: 1975–present
- Labels: Diskoton, PGP RTB, Diskos (record label), JV, PGP RTS, ZaM, Grand Production, Vujin Records

Mitar Mirić (Serbo-Croatian Cyrillic: Митар Мирић, born 16 January 1957) is a Serbian pop-folk singer. Some of his most popular songs include: "Ciganče", "Nisam lopov", "Voli me danas više nego juče", "Doberman", "Pomirenje", and superhit "Ne može nam niko ništa". He was a long-time collaborator and friend of late Novica Urošević. He sold over 15 million albums, making him one of the best selling folk singers in former Yugoslavia.

== Early life ==
Mitar Mirić was born on 16 January 1957, in the village of Bogutovo Selo near the town of Ugljevik in the northeastern part of SR Bosnia and Herzegovina, Yugoslavia (modern-day Bosnia and Herzegovina). He finished secondary school in Ugljevik. He began his professional musical career in 1975 and moved to Serbia in 1976, where he has been living ever since.

== Musical career ==
He began his professional career in 1975 with the release of his first single, Od mene je ljubav jaca, on newly established Diskoton, based in Sarajevo, followed by another single, Kad se spusti tiho vece, on national record label PGP-RTB, based in capital Belgrade, in Serbia. In 1976 he moved to Serbia, and joined recording house Diskos based in Aleksandrovac. Diskos was among the major record labels of former Yugoslavia. He began singing in a Sremska Mitrovica restaurant. An important part in his success and career was Novica Urošević, who had written for Mitar from 1979 until 1997. Another important part was Branimir Đokić's orchestra which accompanied Mirić from 1979 to 1984, with whom he recorded four singles, and five albums.

For a concert in Croatia, Mirić has a fee of €3000 .

== Reception and popular culture ==
His single "Ne može nam niko ništa" became a huge hit. When the Serbia national under-19 football team won the 2013 European Championship, Ne može nam niko ništa was sung by the players during celebration, and later a video was released in which some players were guests at Mitar Mirić's house where they together sung it to the accordion.

He is the favourite singer of Serbian footballer Duško Tošić, and his hit song has been sung by Bosnian Serb politician Milorad Dodik on cultural festivals, Croatian football coach Zdravko Mamić during a TV show and a wedding.

== Personal life ==
He lives in central Belgrade, with his wife Suzana and daughter Sanja. He was involved in a car crash on 6 May 2005, in Orašje, in which his car stopped a few metres from a mine field. His godfather was Novica Urošević, who died from alcoholism in 2009. He does not speak any English. His popular nickname "Tarmi Rićmi", derived from šatrovački slang used by Serbian youth, is widespread, and he has been spoofed by Straight Jackin' in their song "Tarmi Rićmi", as well as in Beovizija entry "Ring, ring, ring" by The Breeze. He is nicknamed "Djuro" by his friends.

He appeared on the Serbian reality show Dvor, in which he was one of the most popular contestants. He scuffled with Nemanja Nikolić during the show. In 2017 he appeared as an actor in popular TV show called "Sindjelići"

== Awards ==
- Festival Ilidža, in 1978
- Zlatni mikrofron ("Golden microphone"), in 2002
- Zlatni melos ("Golden melody"), several times

== Discography ==
Singles

- Od mene je ljubav jača – Diskoton (1975)
- Kad se spusti tiho veče – PGP RTB (1976)
- Na rastanku nisam suze krio – Diskos (1976)
- Dodjoh srećan da me vidi majka – Diskos (1977)
- Pevajte mi pesme tužne – Diskos (1977)
- Nizamski rastanak – Diskos (1978)
- Okreni se ne okrenula se – Diskos (1978)
- Ne pitaj me kad ću sutra doći – Diskos (1979)
- Poslednja stranica – Diskos (1979) Festival Ilidza, composed by Novica Urošević
- Voli me danas više nego juče – Diskos (1980)
- Umreću bez tebe nevero moja – Diskos (1980) Festival Ilidza
- Hoću mesto u tvom srcu – Diskos (1981)
- Svira kuka - (1982 feat Slobodan Kuka)
- Volim narodno - (2004 feat Siniša Vuco)
- Grešnik – (2010)
- Devica – (2011) (feat. In Vivo)
- Diskoteke klubovi - (2012)
- Živeli - (2013-feat MC Stojan & Marko Vanilla)
- Noći moje, noći lude - (2013)
- Zapali me - (2013)
- Braća po duši - (2014)
- Neodoljiva - (2014)
- Zvali ste na jedno piće - (2017)
- Sedi mi u krilo - (2018)
- Okrenuću drugu stranu - (2019)
- Vrediš (2021)
- Daće Mitar (2023)

Albums

- Nikoga svoga nemam – Diskos (1979)
- Voli me danas više nego juče – Diskos (1980), composed by Novica Urošević
- Hoću mesto u tvom srcu – Diskos (1981)
- Dobro jutro rekoh zori – Diskos (1982), composed by Novica Urošević
- U svanuće ne idem do kuće – Diskos (1982), composed by Novica Urošević
- Sve su iste osim tebe – Diskos (1984), composed by Novica Urošević
- Živela ljubav – Diskos (1984), composed by Novica Urošević
- Ne diraj čoveka za stolom – Diskos (1986), composed by Novica Urošević
- Ako umrem da mi žao nije – Diskos (1987), composed by Novica Urošević
- Dajte mi da živim – Diskos (1988), composed by (D.Aleksandric)
- Ne može nam niko ništa – Diskos (1989), composed by Novica Urošević
- Najjači smo, najjači – Diskos (1990), composed by Novica Urošević
- Nepopravljiv – Diskos (1992), composed by Novica Urošević
- Devojka preko puta – JV (1993), composed by Novica Urošević
- Dotakni me – PGP RTS (1995), composed by Novica Urošević
- Čudotvorac – Diskos (1996), composed by Novica Urošević
- Ja ne živim ovde – Diskos (1997), composed by Novica Urošević
- Haljine svilene – ZaM (1998)
- Samo kaži – Grand Production (2000)
- Nekad sam i ja voleo – Grand Production (2002)
- Pomirenje – Grand Production (2003)
- Neka puca – Grand Production (2006)
- Ličiš na sve moje bivše – Vujin Records (2009)
- Nemoj da mi brojiš bore – BN Music (2011)
- Pametnica - Grand Production (2016)
