= Karoti, Evros =

Karoti Καρωτή
- Community
- Location within Greece
- Coordinates: 41°21′N 26°27′E
- Country: Greece
- Administrative region: East Macedonia and Thrace
- Regional unit: Evros
- Municipality: Didymoteicho
- Municipal unit: Didymoteicho

Population (2021)
  - Community: 181
- Time zone: UTC+2 (EET)
  - Summer (DST): UTC+3 (EEST)

Karoti (Greek: Καρωτή) is a village in the municipality of Didymoteicho in the northern part of the Evros regional unit, Greece. Its population was 181 in 2021. Karoti is 10 km (6.2 mi) northwest of central Didymoteicho. It was annexed to Greece as a result of the 1919 Treaty of Neuilly.

== Population ==
Year	Population
1981	1,336
1991	1,156
2001	723
2011	271
2021	181

== Notable people ==
- Chronis Aidonidis (born 1928), singer

== See also ==
- List of settlements in the Evros regional unit
