= Dvoyanka =

Wind instrument

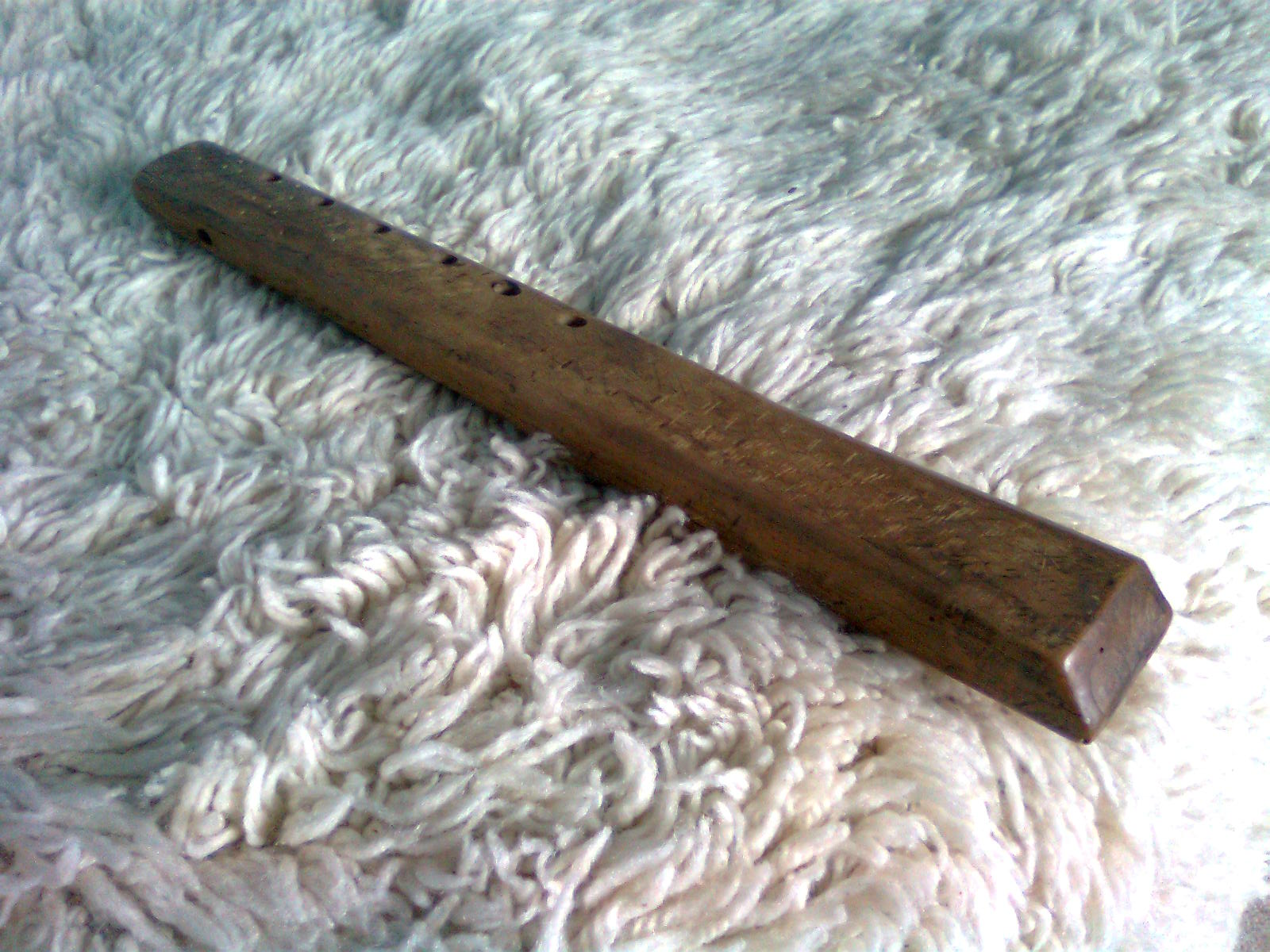
Dvoyanka (Bulgarian double flute)

The Bulgarian dvoyanka is a double flute made of a single piece of wood, with six sound holes on one side.

It is most frequently made of ash-wood, plum tree, pear tree, cornel or boxwood. The tune is played on the right pipe, while the left pipe provides a flat tone (or drone) as accompaniment. The playing structure on the right pipe is similar to that of the music played on the kaval. Line-dances and lively melodies are frequently played on it.

The dvoyanka has traditionally been an instrument favored by shepherds. Shepherds directed their flocks by their playing, since sheep remember and recognize a melody in time. A shepherd could "teach" his flock to start from the pen towards the pasture at one melody, and to return to the village in the evening at another. The instrument bears similitudes to the dvojnica, an instrument typical for the regions of Central and Western Serbia and Serbian regions across the river Drina, which is made and played somewhat differently.

The dvoyanka is a double pipe (gaida), which has a form of a rectangular prism or which is more rarely is composed form two parallel cylindrical tubes. It has a length from 30 to 40 cm. All of the two tubes begin with a bill formed nozzle in which the tone is produced with an ordinary blowing. When playing on a duduk the two tubes are temporarily blown.

Dvoyanka is a wind musical instrument in the form of a rectangular prism with two parallel channels. The one channel sets the tone, and the other on which the six holes are situated reproduces the melody. This double flute is also called "the little bagpipe". It's made from plum tree, cherry, pear tree, maple, ash, beech, oak, or corneal tree. Music performed on the double flute has a very specific coloring.

== Related instruments ==
Similar instruments are found in Albania (cyla-diare), Macedonia (piska), Greece (disavli), Romania (fluierul gemanat), and Serbia (dvojnice) in one build or another. One difference, however, is that where the Bulgarian dvoyanka is rectangular in shape, where the two tubes are bored straight through a single block of wood and the material in between remains intact, in Albania and Serbia the wood between the tubes may be cut away so that they resemble two separate "legs" (the instrument then resembles an upside-down Y; see other instruments in this case).

== See also ==
- Dvodentsivka
