= Šeki Bihorac =

- Born: Šefćet Bihorac
- Genres: Pop-folk, Folk
- Occupation: singer
- Instrument: Vocals
- Years active: 1990–present

Šefćet "Šeki" Bihorac (Serbian Cyrillic: Шевћет "Шеки" Бихорац; born in Sjenica, SR Serbia, Yugoslavia) is a Bosnian folk singer. He was frequently sent to Sarajevo, Bosnia during his childhood, and in Sarajevo, he began his music career.

== Discography ==
- Ne zovite doktore (1990)
- Svani zoro (1993)
- Majko mila (1995)
- Kad me ne bude (1999)
- Ti si meni bila sve (2001)
- Kreni, kreni (2003)
- Maloljetnja (2003)
- Uživo (2006)
- Mnoge žene ljubio... (2007)
- Nek je sretna moja vila (2011)
