= Maja Marijana =

Marijana Radovanović (Serbian Cyrillic: Маријана Радовановић; born 8 November 1972 in Belgrade, Yugoslavia), known by her stage name Maja Marijana (Serbian Cyrillic: Маја Маријана), is a Serbian pop-folk singer and TV presenter who has considerable success in former Yugoslav countries. She has made eleven albums since she started singing in 1992.

== Singles and songs ==
Her most famous singles are:

- Napraviću lom (2005)
- Crni panter (2006)
- Žena zmija (2008)
- Haos (2010)
- Za tugu su narodnjaci zakon (2011)
- Šampion (2011)
- Manijak (2012)
