= Nektaria Karantzi =

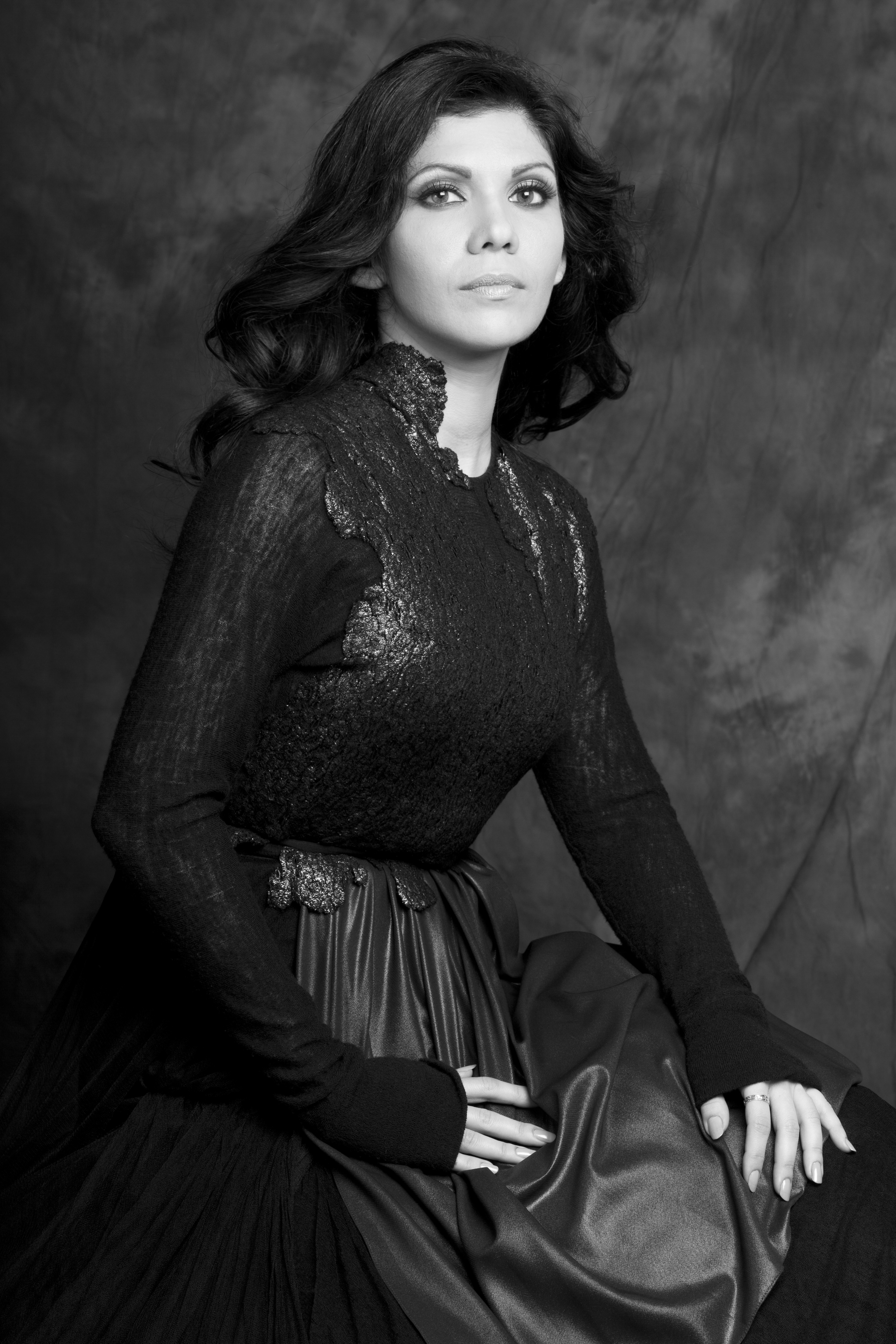
- Nektaria Karantzi

Background information
- Born: 5 August 1982 (age 44)
- Origin: Greece
- Genres: Byzantine music
- Occupations: Singer, lawyer

Nektaria Karantzi (Greek: Νεκταρία Καραντζή; born 5 August 1982 in Greece) is a Byzantine and traditional singer from Greece.

Her voice is primarily associated with Byzantine music, and she is regarded as one of the most important voices in the Byzantine tradition. As a Greek performer of Byzantine music, she has been active since she was fourteen, with a discography in this genre, and has been chanting as a chorister in church since she was nine. Her performances in concert halls both in Greece and abroad are dedicated to Byzantine chant, and she has been internationally acclaimed as an ideal performer of Byzantine melos (chanting) and of the Primeval Tradition.

== Education ==
=== Legal studies ===
Nektaria Karantzi studied law at Aristotle University of Thessaloniki and later obtained three postgraduate degrees in criminal law, criminology, and ecclesiastical Law from the University of Athens. She is currently a doctoral candidate in criminal law at the University of Athens. She has also earned a Doctor of Law degree. Karantzi has worked as an editor at Law Publishers P. Sakoulas and at the magazine Penal Law Chronicles. She has been an associate in the Department of Criminal Law at the University of Athens and has worked with the law firms of former President of the Piraeus Bar Association, Vassilis Venetis, and Platon Niadis.

=== Music ===
Karantzi holds a diploma in Byzantine music from the Byzantine School of Music and has been taught by tutors including Dimitris Verykios. As of 2003, she was training in traditional singing under the renowned interpreter of traditional songs, Chronis Aidonidis. In addition, she has studied piano and Western musical theory and has also received voice training under Thanos Petrakis and Dina Goudioti.

== Musical career ==
Nektaria Karantzi teaches Byzantine music at the Central Conservatoire of Athens. She has also begun collaborating with Chronis Aidonidis on concerts and recordings.

She has participated in a series of five tapes and CDs featuring the chanting of Byzantine hymns, starting at the age of fourteen while accompanying the blessed Elder Porphyrios. Additionally, she collaborated with Chronis Aidonidis on the recording of two albums: When Paths Meet (a double CD) and He Was Grieved.

In her early recordings of chanting, Karantzi accompanied the contemporary saint Saint Porphyrios the Kapsokalyvite, and with his encouragement, she began her studies in Byzantine music at a very young age. She completed her studies in Byzantine music and received both a degree and a diploma from the Byzantine Music School of the Holy Metropolis of Piraeus, where she was taught by notable tutors including Dimitris Verykios. Nektaria Karantzi is also well known in Greek stage music through her apprenticeship and lengthy collaboration with the renowned teacher of Greek traditional music, Chronis Aidonides. Another significant aspect of her career was her collaboration with the acclaimed pianist, composer, and conductor Vassilis Tsabropoulos, in a project that blended Byzantine hymns with Western and Eastern influences.

== Live performances ==
She gave her first performance at the Athens Concert Hall on 25 May 2004, in a concert showcasing Chronis Aidonidis's career. Since then, she has participated in many other concerts and events.

In 2005, she participated with Chronis Aidonidis and Dimitris Verykios in the Easter television show He Was Grieved on the Hellenic TV channel, where she sang Byzantine hymns for Holy Week. In 2006, she took part in the sixth Festival of Sacred Music in Patmos.

Other key moments in her career include invitations from the Franz Liszt Academy of Music in Hungary and Sorbonne University in France, where she gave master classes on Byzantine music. Nektaria has presented numerous concerts of Byzantine and traditional folk music in Greece and abroad, including in France, Hungary, Serbia, Turkey, North Macedonia, Bulgaria, Estonia, Switzerland, Letonia, Luxembourg, Spain, Italy. She has also collaborated with the renowned Hungarian traditional singer and UNESCO Artist for Peace Marta Sebestyen and the distinguished St. Ephraim Male Choir.

== Discography ==
Discography

With Saint Porphyrios of Kafsokalyvia

- 1. Elder Porphyrios & Nektaria Karantzi: "Jesus Glikitate" (ed. "The transfiguration of the Savior", 1993)
- 2. Elder Porphyrios & Nektaria Karantzi: "Hymnissomen pantes theoprepos" (ed. "The transfiguration of the Savior", 1996)
- 3. Elder Porphyrios & Nektaria Karantzi: "Evlogitos o Theos" (ed. "The transfiguration of the Savior", 1998)
- 4. Elder Porphyrios & Nektaria Karantzi: "Prokatharomen eaftous" (ed. "The transfiguration of the Savior", 2001)

With Chronis Aidonidis

- 1. Chronis Aidonidis & Nektaria Karantzi: "Otan i dromi synantiountai" (ed. Melodiko Karavi, 2004)
- 2. Chronis Aidonidis & Nektaria Karantzi: "Epikranthi" (ed. Apostolic Diakonia of Church of Greece, 2006)
- 3. Chronis Aidonidis & Nektaria Karantzi: "Afraston Thavma" (ed. Legend/Lyra, 2009)

With Vassilis Tsabropoulos

- 1. Vassilis Tsabropoulos & Nektaria Karantzi: "Eleison" (ed. MSO, 2016)

Personal:

- 1. Nektaria Karantzi: "Hymns and Lamentations of Holly Week" (Limited Edition – 2011)
- 2. Nektaria Karantzi: "Hymns and Song for the Mother of God" (Limited Edition 2012)
- 3. Nektaria Karantzi: "Christmas Hymns and Carols" (Limited Edition 2012)
- 4. Nektaria Karantzi: "Anastasis" (Limited Editions – 2013)
- 5. Nektaria Karantzi: "Hymns and Songs to the Mother of God" (ed. Radio Station of the Greek Orthodox Church- 2014)

Selected Participations:

- 1. "The ring of Emperor", Grigoriadou Soureli's book & CD/Music: George Voukanos (ed. Apostolic Diakonia of Church of Greece, 2006)
- 2. "1936–2006 Apostoliki Diakonia", a cd Tribut to 70 years of Apostolic Diakonia of Church of Greece ( Limited Edition 2006)
- 3. "Estoudiantina – Na ta poume" (limited edition. 2009)
- 4. "Chronis Aidonidis, the master of Tradition" (limited edition, 2009)
- 5."Kalossorissate" live concert at the Athens Concert Hall (2009)
- 6. "Ionias Egkomion", live concert at the Athens Concert Hall (2010)

== Honours ==
Nektaria Karantzi is the founder and honorary president of the Panhellenic Association of Women in Byzantine Ecclesiastical Music. She has been honored for her contributions to Byzantine music by the Byzantine Chanters [Ieropsaltes] through the Hellenic Musicological Society – Institute for Byzantine and Greek Traditional Music Studies and the music magazine To Psaltiri. She is also the artistic director of the Traditional Music School "Chronis Aidonides" and serves as the Legal Advisor and Public Relations and Press Manager for the Metropolitan Symphony Orchestra of Athens.

== Other activities ==
She is part of the development team for the internet musical community in Greece, www.musicheaven.gr, and is a producer at a Greek radio station.
