= Nihad Kantić – Šike =

Bosnian singer (born 1960)

- Born: Nihad Kantić; June 1, 1960 (age 66); Rapatnica via Srebrenik, Bosnia and Herzegovina
- Genre: Folk music
- Occupation: Musician
- Instrument: vocals

Nihad Kantić – Šike (born June 1, 1960) is a Bosnian singer. He released around a dozen studio albums, mostly on Diskos, but also on Jugoton, ZKP RTLJ, Nimfa Sound and Grand Production.

He is also a member of the jury in Valentino Zvijezde talent show on OTV Valentino. He has two sons.

== Discography ==
He released the following albums:

- "Gde Je Žena Koju Sam Voleo" (Diskos, 1982)
- "Zakuni Se Da Me Voliš" (ZKP RTVL, 1983)
- "Pozeli Me" (ZKP RTVL, 1985)
- "Volesmo Se Jedno Leto" (Diskos, 1986)
- "Na Dlanu Mi Kratka Linija" (Diskos, 1987)
- "Kad Ti Teško Bude" (Jugoton, 1989)
- "Hej, Mala, Malena" (Diskos, 1989)
- "Naše Vreme Dolazi (Diskos, 1990)
- "Nikome Nismo Krivi" (Diskos, 1992)
- "Bosnu Pustite Bosancima" (1994)
- "Vesela Kafana" (1995)
- "Odlazim Daleko" (Nimfa Sound, 1996)
- "Slijepi putnik" (1998)
- "Zbog Te Žene" (Grand Production, 2000)
- "Samo Ti" (2003)
- "Uživo" (2004)
- "Šarmer" (2005)
- "Stižu Godine" (VIP, 2008)
- "Premijerno" (Top Music, 2011)
