= Jelena Jovanović (politician) =

Politician in Serbia

Jelena Jovanović (Serbian Cyrillic: Јелена Јовановић; born 1980) is a politician in Serbia. She has served in the Assembly of Vojvodina since 2016 as a member of the Serbian Progressive Party. Jovanović is the first Roma woman to serve in the provincial assembly.

== Early life and private career ==
Jovanović was raised in Stara Pazova, Vojvodina. She graduated from the School of Higher Business in Novi Sad and later from the Faculty of Management in Sremski Karlovci. Before running for office, she worked at the provincial secretariat for regulations, administration, and national minorities. She subsequently indicated that she was the first Roma woman to be employed by the provincial government and that she "knows how difficult it is to be the first in something." She has spoken of the importance of Roma people becoming active in Serbian state institutions as a necessary step for progress, both for the community and for Serbian society as a whole. Jovanović now lives in Novi Sad.

== Politician ==
=== Assembly of Vojvodina ===
Jovanović received the twenty-ninth position on the Progressive Party's electoral list in the 2016 Vojvodina provincial election and was elected when the list won a majority victory with sixty-three out of 120 mandates. She was subsequently given the forty-ninth position on the party's list for the 2020 provincial election and was re-elected when the list won an increased majority with seventy-six mandates. She is the deputy chair of the assembly's national equality committee and a member of the committee on health, social policy, labour, demographic policy, and social care for children.

As an elected provincial representative, Jovanović is a prominent spokesperson for the Roma community in Vojvodina. She has often emphasized the importance of education for the community, and she has argued that Serbia compares favourably with most European countries in combatting anti-Roma discrimination.

=== Roma National Council ===
Jovanović is also a member of Serbia's Roma National Council. She appeared in the second position on the Roma Voice for Europe electoral list in the 2014 council elections and was elected when the list won five out of thirty-five mandates. She subsequently led the All-European Roma Movement list to a landslide victory with thirty-two mandates in the 2018 election.
