= Nervozni poštar =

Bosnian folk rock band

Nervozni poštar ("Nervous Postman") is a Bosnian folk rock band, formed in 1985 by rhythm guitarist (and physician) Fadil Šabović. The band is notable for its combination of hard rock music and folk music, two of the styles of music that were usually seen as too different from each other to be combined. Most of the songs (including music, lyrics and arrangement) were written by Šabović. The band was inactive between 1990–2002 and a period in 2004–2017.

== Members ==
- Fadil Šabović - lead, writer
- Nusret "Nuki" Doličanin, vocals
- Dragan "Gago" Ðurdelija, bass
- Siniša Cekić "Ceka", solo guitar
- Dušan "Dule" Simić, drums
- Goran Mladenović "Suhi", piano, accordion
- Dušan Kolarević "Koki", rhythm guitar

== Discography ==
=== Studio albums ===
- Vazda gazda (1985)
- Zapamti, ja sam gazda (1986)
- Ništa više nije kao prije (1987)
- Nervozni poštar (1988)
- To je samo Folk 'n' Roll (1989)
- Život to je divna fešta (2001)
- Gas - Gas (2004)
- Nervozni Poštar 2017 (2017)

=== Singles ===
- Zapamti, ja sam gazda / Mi smo drvosječe (1986)
- Ej, Maro, Marice (1987)
- Vojnička pjesma / Nova Godina (1988)

=== Most popular songs ===
- "Nova godina kuca na vratima"
- "Marko kamiondžija"
- "Cirkus Kolorado"
- "Vojnička pjesma"
- "Bilo jednom u SFRJ"
- "Sarajevo, slatki dome moj"
- "Vazda gazda"
- "Srce od zlata"
- "To Je Samo Folk'n'Roll"
- "Mi smo drvosječe, potaman nam sve"
- "Salko dinamitaš"
- "Ženim se"
- "Moj Ford stari nikad se ne kvari"
- "Ja živim sam"
- "Čoban tjera ovčice"
- "Sanjam"
- "Šljivovica ljuta"
- "Jugo, Jugo, Kućo Moja Jedina"
