= Mohamed Maghni =

Moroccan singer (born 1950)

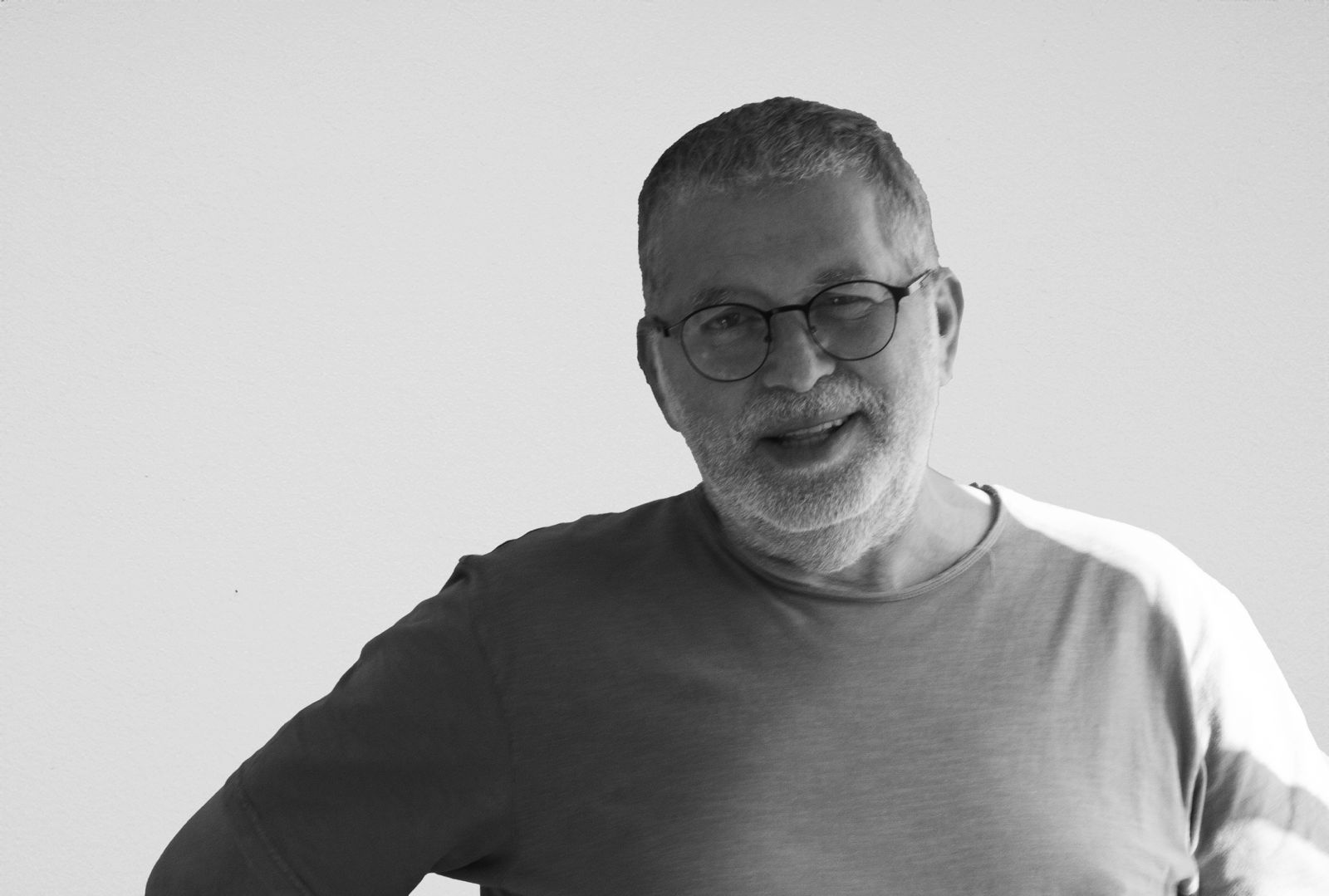

Background information
- Born: محمد مغني; 1 January 1950 (age 76); Khenifra, Morocco
- Genres: Berber music; Ahidous; Moroccan Folk Music
- Occupation: Singer
- Years active: 1970–2014

Mohamed Maghni (Arabic: محمد مغني, Tamazight ⵎⵓⵃⴰⵎⴻⴷ ⵎⵖⵏⵉ, born 1950 in Khenifra) is a Moroccan singer. Maghni sings traditional folk music from the Zayanes people. The instrument he used is Loutar, and the language is Central Atlas Tamazight.
