= Osman Hadžić =

Bosnian folk singer (born 1966)

- Born: 9 September 1966 (age 59); Cazin, SR Bosnia and Herzegovina, SFR Yugoslavia
- Genres: Folk
- Occupation: Musician
- Years active: 1989–present

Osman Hadžić (born 9 September 1966) is a Bosnian folk singer.

== Discography ==
- Lažu oči zelene (1990)
- Nikad više snježana (1991)
- Za njom plaću crne oči (1993)
- Obriši suze baksuze (1994)
- Nije čudo što te volim ludo (1999)
- Ostarit ćemo (2000)
- Prezime (2002)
- Zbog ljubavi (2005)
- I ovako i onako (2007)
- Poljubi me (2009) ft. Sabrina
- Ponovo se volimo (2011)
