= Feim Ibrahimi =

Albanian composer (1935–1997)

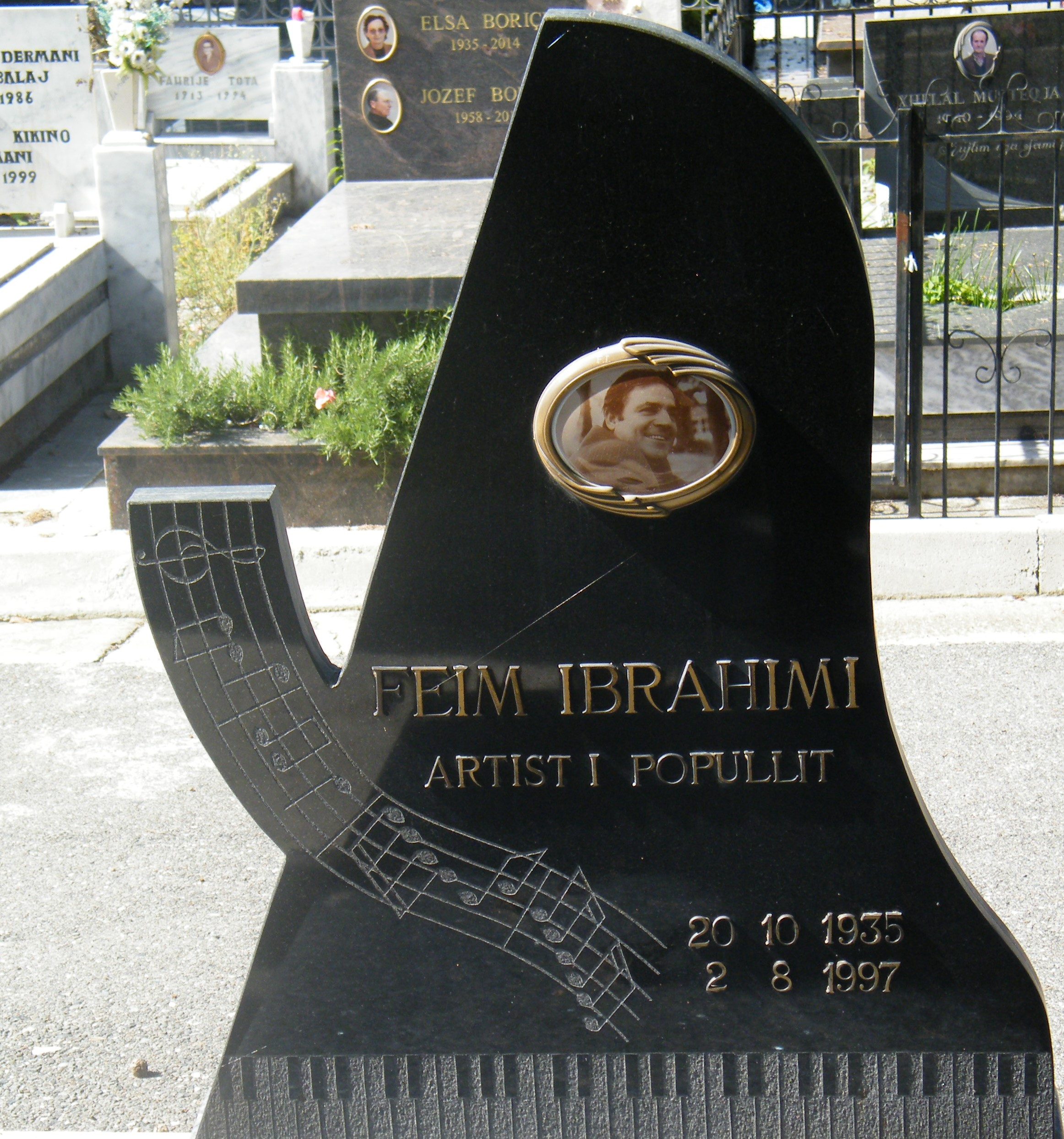
Photo of Feim Ibrahimi on his grave

Feim Ibrahimi (1935–1997) was an Albanian composer born on 20 October 1935 in Gjirokastër, southern Albania. Essentially self-taught in his early years, he became the first significant Albanian composer to study exclusively in his home country, entering the newly founded Tirana Conservatory in 1962 and studying there with Daija until 1966. He then taught composition, counterpoint and harmony at the conservatory (1966–73), subsequently serving as vice-director of its parent body, the Superior Institute of Arts (1973–7). His most significant post was as music secretary of the Union of Albanian Writers and Artists (1977–91); he later also served as director of the Theatre of Opera and Ballet, Tirana (1991–92). From 1992 until his death he taught theory and composition at the Tirana Conservatory.

As music secretary during Albania’s period of cultural isolation, Ibrahimi showed himself a capable administrator, exerting a positive influence on Albania’s musical life. Though obliged by his office to defend socialist realism, during his official travels abroad he tried, as much as was possible, to keep up with international musical developments, experimenting in secret with atonality (e.g. in the Cello Sonata, 1975, rev. 1990), expressing a private interest in Xenakis as early as 1981, and inviting to Albania such avant-garde figures as Stabler.

In October 1990, Ibrahimi presented a report about the situation of song composers to the League of Writers and Artists. According to musicologist Nicholas Tochka, he underlined the importance of a creator's individuality (which was frowned upon in socialist Albania), and shared the complaints of many composers. He criticized the increasing “politicization” of music, which he argued led to it becoming sclerotic and schematic. He asserted that ordinary people were less inclined to sing Albanian songs, which were overly propagandistic. He also mentioned that instruments like electric guitars and saxophones had to be subtly incorporated into festivals, concealed behind other instruments to avoid drawing attention. He cited international artists like Julio Iglesias, Marinella, Mikis Theodorakis, Toto Cotugno, and even the Beatles as positive examples rooted in urban popular music. He called for increased support for the expanding number of “small light music ensembles,” a term alluding to new guitar-based groups. He also praised the broader range of themes that now better resonated with people's emotions, advising patience with their rising popularity, as these songs were only recently “recognized” and would take time to meet the public’s longstanding demand.

After the collapse of the communist régime he worked tirelessly to bring Albanian music into the wider European musical arena. In 1991 he was the first President of National Music’s Council (member of the International Music’s Council to the UNESCO). He founded the festival Evenings of New Albanian Music in 1992. In 1994 he founded the artistic society “Pentaton” (now Cultural Foundation “Feim Ibrahimi”), aiming to organize several cultural events and to establish a private conservatory for gifted children. Some his works are published in England by the Emerson Edition.

For his artistic merits, in 1989, the Albanian State conferred him the title “People’s Artist”, the highest artistic title in Albania. Whereas in 2000, the town hall of Tirana conferred him the title “The gratitude of Tirana” for his contribution to the Albanian culture, and especially to the culture of the capital. In 2001, the town hall of Durrës (the city where he passed his childhood and youth) conferred him the Honorary Citizenship.

Ibrahimi has won many prizes in national competitions and in “May Concerts” (the main national festival organized annually since 1967). He has won two Republic prizes – the most important award in the field of creative activity. In 1990, a concert-portrait, which included a lecture on his music, was organized at the Aalto Theaterfoyer, in Essen (Germany). In 1994, at the Brahms-Gesellschaft’s invitation, he was composer-in-residence at the Brahmshaus of Baden-Baden (Germany), and immediately afterwards he studied electro-acoustic music at Mozarteum in Salzburg (Austria). In 1995, his work De Profundis –composed during his residency in Salzburg– was selected for the International Electronic Music Festival in Bourges, France.

Ibrahimi’s music includes nearly all genres: instrumental miniatures, soundtracks, chamber music, concertos for solo instruments and orchestra, symphonies, ballets and vocal works. Dialogo for cello and piano and the romance E la tua veste è bianca (after the poem of Salvatore Quasimodo) for soprano, cello and piano (both composed in June 1997) are the last works of the composer, who died the 2 August 1997 in Turin, Italy.

== Discography ==
- Kenge, Albanian Piano Music, Vol. 1, Kirsten Johnson, piano, Guild GMCD 7257; includes Ibrahimi's Toccata for Piano.
- Rapsodi, Albanian Piano Music, Vol. 2, Kirsten Johnson, piano, Guild GMCD 7300; includes Ibrahimi's Vals (Waltz) and Valle per piano (Dance for piano).
- Eno Koço with Albanian Instrumental Soloists, Eno Koço with the Albanian Radio and Television Symphony Orchestra, Albanian Music Classics CD; includes Ibrahimi's Fantasy for Violin with violinist Raimonda Koço
