= Chronis Aidonidis =

Greek singer (1928–2023)

Chronis Aidonidis Χρόνης Αηδονίδης
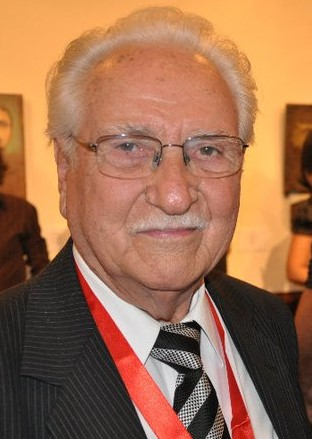
- Aidonidis in 2012

Background information
- Born: 23 September 1928; Karoti, Didymoteicho, Greece
- Died: 23 October 2023 (aged 95) Athens, Greece
- Genres: Folk, entekhno
- Occupation: Musician
- Instrument: Vocals
- Spouse: Foteini Aidonidou (m. 1960)

Chronis Aidonidis (Greek: Χρόνης Αηδονίδης; 23 September 1928 – 23 October 2023) was a Greek singer from Karoti, a village now belonging to Didymoteicho, Greece. His parents were Fr. Christos and Chrysanthi Aidonidis. He learned his first songs in his hometown and was introduced to traditional music by his mother and the musicians who used to play at the local fairs.

== Biography ==
Aidonidis was taught Byzantine music, first by his father, and later by professor Michalis Kefalokoptis. In 1950, he came to live in Athens with his parents, where he completed his studies in Byzantine music at the Hellenic Conservatory with teacher Theodoros Hadjitheodorou. In March of the same year, he was hired at the Sismanogleion Hospital, where he worked as an accountant. In 1953, folklore scientist Polydoros Papachristodoulou offered for him to participate in his radio show entitled Echoes from Thrace, which presented music from his homeland.

Chronis Aidonidis released records with songs from northern, eastern and western Thrace. He participated in hundreds of musical events in Greece and abroad, in places such as the Americas, Australia, the former Soviet Union, and Europe. One step of his artistic journey was his collaboration with the Greek singer George Dalaras for the release of the CD Nightingales from the Orient in March 1990. Another was when the University of Crete released the double CD Songs and Tunes from Thrace in 1993.

Later, he collaborated with his student, Nektaria Karantzi, for the release of the double CD When the Roads Meet, in which he recorded Byzantine Ecclesiastical Hymns for the first time and the CD He was Grieved, in which he and Karantzi recorded 40 Byzantine hymns of the Holy Week and a folk lament.

In 2001, he collaborated with Nikos Kypourgos for the release of a CD entitled Secrets from the Garden. During the Olympic Games of Athens in 2004, Chronis Aidonidis greeted all the guests of Greece by singing the song Welcome My Friends. In 2005, he participated in the Easter television show made by Hellenic Television entitled "He Was Grieved", in which he sang Byzantine hymns of the Holy Week. In 2006, he participated in the 6th Festival of Sacred Music in Patmos, along with Karantzi and the ecclesiastical Byzantine choir, Glorifier (led by Dimitris Verykios).

Aidonidis taught traditional singing at the Zisis Foundation and the Central Conservator in the Chalandri suburb of Athens. He was the artistic director of the Center for the Study of the Musical Tradition of Thrace, Asia Minor and Euxeinos Pontos, as well as the creator and leader of the Workshop for Traditional Music in Alexandroupoli. He was also one of the founders of the Archive of Greek Music.

Chronis Aidonidis died on 23 October 2023 at the age of 95.
