= Novica Urošević =

- Born: Novica Urošević; 1945; Požarevac, SR Serbia, Yugoslavia
- Died: 11 November 2009 (aged 64) Belgrade, Serbia
- Genres: Folk, Dance folk
- Occupation: Musician
- Years active: 1968–2009
- Labels: PGP, Diskos, Diskoton, ZaM, Grand Production

Novica Urošević (Serbian Cyrillic: Новица Урошевић; 1945 – 11 November 2009) was a Serbian folk singer and composer.

Some of his most famous folk song compositions include: Ne može nam niko ništa, Ne daj da nas rastave, Svako traži novu ljubav, and Poslednji boem. He had composed many songs and written lyrics for many singers, including Mitar Mirić, Zorica Brunclik, Jašar Ahmedovski, Ipče Ahmedovski, Jasmin Muharemovic, Šerif Konjević, Šeki Turković, Dragana Mirković, Zorica Marković, Nada Topčagić, Nedeljko Bajić Baja etc. He has also made great hits for Šaban Šaulić (Moj živote, drug mi nisi bio), Miroslav Ilić (Tako mi nedostaješ), and Bora Spužić Kvaka (Od noćas samo kao braća).

He died in front of his apartment in Belgrade on November 11, 2009 and was buried in his native village Drmno. His friends nicknamed him "Ujka Nole".

== Discography ==
Singles

- 1968 (Dve crvene ruže)
- 1971 (1) (Nema sreće bez tebe)
- 1971 (2) (Bi si lepa)
- 1973 (1) (Ko je on, šta je on)
- 1973 (2) (Rastanak bez suza)
- 1974 (1) (Ko će ludom srcu da dokaže)
- 1974 (2) (Kako da preživim najtužniji dan)
- 1975 (Stali smo na pola puta)
- 1976 (1) (Ona hoće tvoje mesto)
- 1976 (2) (Umorni su i svirači)
- 1976 (3) (Hteo sam da volim samo jednu ženu)
- 1977 (Izdao sam samog sebe)
- 1978 (Ponovo sam pred vratima tvojim)
- 1981 (Ja ne mogu da te mrzim)

Albums

- 1978 (Hitovi)
- 1981 (Hitovi)
- 1983 (Moje Pesme, Moji Snovi)
- 1985 (Ustaj, sine, zora je)
- 1986 (Ne idi grlom u jagode)
- 2002 (To sam ja)

Other

- 1978, Kćeri moja, kome da te dam (with Zorica Brunclik)
- 1983, Cuka, svira kuka (with Mitar Mirić)
- 1984, Sviraju Pale i Meneka (with Mitar Mirić and Dragana Mirković)
- 1990, Gde je moja ljubav
