= Eva Nedinkovska =

Macedonian singer (born 1983)

Eva Nedinkovska Ева Нединковска
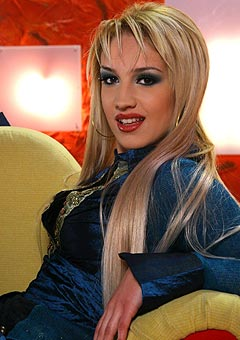

Background information
- Also known as: Eva
- Born: Eva Nedinkovska; August 26, 1983 (age 42); Ohrid, SR Macedonia, SFR Yugoslavia
- Origin: North Macedonia
- Genres: Pop, R&B
- Occupations: Singer, songwriting, dancing
- Instrument: Voice
- Years active: 2003–present
- Label: Paramecium Production

Eva Nedinkovska (Macedonian: Ева Нединковска) (born August 26, 1983) is a Macedonian singer.

== Biography ==
Nedinkovska was born in Ohrid. Her career started in 2003 with the song "Dali Denot Ke E Raj". She has performed on many music contests including "Ohrid Fest" in her native city, Ohrid. Almost on every contest she has the award for the best stage performance. The song "Enigma" is considered to be Eva's biggest hit. "Enigma" is a modern pop song with R&B elements. The video was No.1 almost on every chart in North Macedonia.

== National selection for Eurovision 2006 ==
On the national selection, Eva had 631 votes placing her on the 11th place. Her song "Taan i Med" (Lyrics by the Macedonian diva Kaliopi ) was in oriental style with nice choreography.

== Discography ==
=== Albums ===
- Talisman

=== Singles ===
- Eva - Tvoja Fantazija (Music Video)
- Eva - Tvoja Fantazija (Music Video)
- Eva - Tvoja Fantazija (video)
- Eva - Tvoja Fantazija (video)
- Eva - Tvoja Fantazija (Music Video)
- Eva - Tvoja Fantazija (video)
- Eva - Tvoja Fantazija (Music Video)
- Eva - Tvoja Fantazija (video)

== Sources ==
- Daily Macedonia. “Стоп“ – нова песна на Ева Нединковска ("Stop" – a new song by Eva Nedinkovska). December 14, 2010 (in Macedonian)
- Utrinski vesnik. Ева Нединковска учи џез-пеење (Eva takes up jazz singing. September 5, 2008 (in Macedonian)
