= Nizamski rastanak =

Ottoman army melody

Nizamski rastanak (Turkish: Nizam'ın vedası) is a famous Ottoman Army melody. In English, the song has been translated as The Nizam Departure.

According to Felix Kanitz, because the melody was played by the Ottoman military band orchestras when the Ottomans left Serbia in May 1867, this melody became one of the most favorite Serbian melodies. This Ottoman melody was regularly played by Serbian military orchestras during World War I and was part of an emotional reception of the victory of Serbian army on the Macedonian front. After the war, Nizamski rastanak became part of the repertoire of Serb romanticists and nationalists and was regularly sung during their gatherings.

In 1995, Benjamin Isović used the melody of "Nizamski rastanak" to write the Bosniak song "Šehidski rastanak", believing that he was only bringing back this melody to its Bosnian birthplace. Miljenko Jergović considers the Bosnian origin of the melody as completely uncertain.

Latin alphabet

Skupite se svi, dobri drugovi
neka truba dok ne padne mrak, svira rastanak.
Poslednju našu pesmu vojničku
zapevajmo složno svi nek' se sve ori.

Pa za one prošle dane, nek' ti neka suza kane
pa zar nismo bili mi, dobri drugovi.
Ko da žali noći, ko da žali dane
rastanak se sprema a vremena nema
oj, druže moj.

Još u srcu mom kao teški zvon
odjekuje tužne trube glas, kroz taj garnizon.
Poslednji, tužni pozdrav vojnički
zapevajmo složno svi nek' se sve ori.

Neka svaka cura čuje šta joj vojnik poručuje
sad kad služba prestaje, kad se rastaje.
Ludo živim sada, čudna tuga vlada
uspomena davna iz vojničkih dana,
oj, druže moj.

Serbian Cyrillic

Скупите се сви, добри другови
нека труба док не падне мрак, свира растанак.
Последњу нашу песму војничку
запевајмо сложно сви нек' се све ори.

Па за оне прошле дане, нек' ти нека суза кане
па зар нисмо били ми, добри другови.
Ко да жали ноћи, ко да жали дане
растанак се спрема а времена нема
ој, друже мој.

Још у срцу мом као тешки звон
одјекује тужне трубе глас, кроз тај гарнизон.
Последњи, тужни поздрав војнички
запевајмо сложно сви нек' се све ори.

Нека свака цура чује шта јој војник поручује
сад кад служба престаје, кад се растаје.
Лудо живим сада, чудна туга влада
успомена давна из војничких дана,
ој, друже мој.

English
Translation by Djuradj Vujcic

Get together now, my good friends
may the trumpet play until night sets, our departure.
Our last soldier's song
let's all sing together, may it be heard.

Well for those old days, you can let out a tear
were we not good friends.
Who yearns for the nights, who yearns for the days
the departure is preparing but there is no time
oh, good friend.

Still in my heart, like a hardened bell
are heard sad trumpet sounds, through that garrison.
The last, sad soldier's greeting
let's all sing together, may it be heard.

May every girl hear what a soldier recommends to her
now when the service ends, when we all depart.
I live madly now, a strange sadness is present
a distant memory from my soldier's days,
oh, good friend.

== Sources ==
- Jergović, Miljenko (2004). Inšallah Madona, inšallah. Durieux. ISBN 978-953-188-200-2.
