= Hasan Dudić =

Serbian folk singer and boxer

- Born: Hasan Dudić; 21 July 1957; Šabac, SFR Yugoslavia
- Genres: Folk, Pop-folk
- Occupation: Musician
- Years active: 1974-2026

Hasan Dudić (Serbian Cyrillic: Хасан Дудић; born 21 July 1957) is a Serbian Folk music singer. He was also a national boxing champion in his younger days. He is a president of non-governmental organization Centar za ljudska prava i nacionalne manjine Srbije (Center for Human Rights and National Minorities of Serbia).

== Discography ==
Hasan Dudić released the following full-length albums:

- Kad vreme učini svoje (1980)
- Crna ženo sa očima plavim (1981)
- Sad je kasno za novi početak (1982)
- Ne mogu biti tvoj (1983)
- Ti si mala Crvenkapa (1984)
- Hej, noći lude (1985)
- Još uvek je sanjam (1987)
- Eto to mi je (1989)
- Što me rodi majko (1990)
- Otišla je ona (1992)
- Hej moji drugovi (1993)
- Nije lako biti sam (1997)
