= Belo Platno =

Belo platno
- Origin: Belgrade, Serbia
- Genres: World music, Ethnic music
- Years active: 1997 – present
- Website: www.beloplatno.com

Belo platno (White Linen) is a music ensemble from Belgrade, Serbia, which plays traditional music of Serbia, mostly from Kosovo and Metohia but also from Macedonia in wider sense. The group was founded in 1997 and it became "among most successful ensembles" in Serbia. One of its founders is its leader Vladimir Simić.

Belo platno is one of the first vocal-instrumental ensembles in Serbia that has chosen modal approach to music for its expression, belonging to the older tradition of the Balkans and Serbia. It is characterized by the special way of forming harmony, through the relationship with the basic melody, the supporting flat tone – bordun (the absence of major-minor harmony).

Belo platno uses traditional musical instruments – kaval, tambura, lute, dvoyanka flute, def, goc, tarabuka – or those which eventually became part of the traditional orchestras, such as the violin and cello. Part of the ensemble instrumentarium Vladimir Simić crafts himself in a family workshop.

== Selected discography ==
Independent albums

- Belo platno, Live in Russia 2012, DVD & CD, EtnoKuznja, Ribinsk, 2014.
- Svetlana Spajić and „Belo platno", Kosovo i Metohija, lice Evrope, multimedia CD, „Tipon", „TIA Janus", 2006. and „Svetigora", 2008.
- Belo platno, Belo platno: traditional music of Kosovo and Metochy, south Serbia and Macedonia, „Atos", Belgrade, 2003.

Important compilations

- Various performers, Serbian Ethno Sound, „HiFi Centar", Belgrade, 2004.
- Various performers, Podignimo Stupove, concert in Sava Center, PGP-RTS, 2003.
- Various performers, Serbia Sounds Global, vol. 2, RingRing i B92, 2002.

== Members ==
- Vladimir Simić, ensemble leader – Lute and other instruments
- Svetlana Spajić, voice
- Anastasija Ostojić, voice
- Olja Njaradi, voice
- Dragana Tomić, voice and kaval
- Goran Milošević, percussions
- Nikola Šener, viola
