= DJ Krmak =

Bosnian Croat folk singer (born 1968)

- Born: Goran Žižak; 30 August 1968 (age 57); Banja Luka, SR Bosnia and Herzegovina, Yugoslavia
- Genres: Turbo-folk, techno-folk
- Occupation: Musician
- Years active: 1999–present
- Labels: Diskoluks, Lazarevic production, Gold music, JVP Fetrib, VIP production, Vujin records, Gold audio video, BN music

Goran Žižak (born 30 August 1968), better known as DJ Krmak (Di-džej Krmak), is a Bosnian Croat turbo-folk musician.

== Biography ==
Žižak began making music in childhood, when he started performing at the nearby motels. Upon completing his mandatory military service, he came back to music. He graduated from 3 colleges. His songs are mostly related to current life topics.

== Discography ==
- Коckari (1999)
- Šumaher (2000)
- Bo San Remo (2001)
- Hollywood (2003)
- Meksikanac (2004)
- Vanzemljaci (2006)
- Doktore (2007)
- Klasična armija (2007)
- Tu Tu (2008)
- Bez konkurencije (2010)
- Doživotna robija (2012)
- Mehanicar (2019)
- Karantena (2020)

== See also ==
- Music of Bosnia and Herzegovina
- Turbo-folk
