= Esad Plavi =

Bosnian singer (born 1965)

Esad Muhamerović
- Born: 30 April 1965 (age 61); Tešanj, SR Bosnia and Herzegovina, Yugoslavia
- Occupation: Singer
- Years active: 1989–present
- Label: BN Music

Esad Muharemović (Serbo-Croatian Cyrillic: Есад Мухаремовић; born 30 April 1965), known by his stage name Esad Plavi (Serbo-Croatian Cyrillic: Есад Плави, "Esad the Blond / Blond Esad") is a Bosnian pop-folk singer. Esad's best known songs are "Šeherezada", popular with young females, and "Babo". Esad is the twin brother of Bosnian singer Jasmin Muharemović.

== Personal life and career ==
Born in Tešanj, Esad's life was affected by his father's death. His talent was discovered at his brother's wedding party where Esad sang. His first contract was signed in 1989, and after a year he released his debut album Ne kuni što si voljela (Don't curse what you have loved).

== Discography ==
- Ne kuni što si volela (1990)
- Reci srećo (1991)
- Ima dana i kafana (1993)
- Daš, ne daš (1994)
- Preboljet ću ove noći (2000)
- Evo mene nakon svega (2001)
- Put me zove (2003)
- Kao nekad (2005)
- Ostavi nešto svoje (2009)
- Kupih burmu u Serije na Jelahu (2010)
