= Novica Zdravković =

Serbian folk singer (1947–2021)

Novica "Nole" Zdravković
- Born: Novica Zdravković; 21 July 1947; Leskovac, PR Serbia, Yugoslavia
- Died: 16 June 2021 (aged 73) Belgrade, Serbia
- Genres: Folk, Pop-folk
- Occupation: Musician

Novica Zdravković (Serbian Cyrillic: Новица Здравковић; 21 July 1947 – 16 June 2021) was a Serbian folk singer. He was the younger brother of Toma Zdravković. He was married to Jelena and had a son and a daughter. Early in his career, he was known by his nickname Nole.

His son is Dušan Zdravković, also a folk singer, who inherited the singing talent from his father and his uncle. Novica died on 16 June 2021, in Belgrade.

== Discography ==
Novica Zdravković released the following full-length albums:

- Navik'o sam ja na noćni život (1986), as Nole Zdravković
- Bol bolujem (1989), as Nole Zdravković
- Ne verujem (1992)
- Pesme za Tomu (1992)
- Pijem još od juče (1995)
- Sve ja znam (1997)
- Splavovi (2000)
- Ambis mog života (2003)
- Kralj splavova (2004)
- Ovo je ludnica (2005)
