= Jelena Jovanović (ethnomusicologist) =

Serbian ethnomusicologist

Jelena Jovanović is an ethnomusicologist and a corresponding member of the Serbian Academy of Sciences and Arts (SANU).

== Biography ==
Jovanović was born on 27 September 1964 in Belgrade, Serbia. Upon graduating from Mokranjac secondary music school, she enrolled in the Ethnomusicology Department of the Belgrade University Faculty of Music.

She graduated in 1991 with the subject "Old wedding songs and customs in Gornja Jasenica - Wedding model, its Forms and Development". Jovanović acquired her master's degree in 2001 with the thesis entitled "Vocal Heritage of the Serbis in Upper Banat Region in Romania in the Light of Authochthonous and Adopted Music Practices", and her Ph.D. degree in 2010 with the thesis "Vocal Tradition of Jasenica Region in the Light of Ethnogenetic Processes". Jovanović has been a research associate in the Institute of Musicology since 2011.

== Work ==
Jovanović's research into Serbian vocal traditions is mainly based on her own field work, as well as on earlier transcriptions made by senior colleagues. She took part in a series of local and international symposia. Her papers have been published in various scientific journals and symposium proceedings. She is a member of ethnomusicological societies in Serbia and abroad (SED, ICTM).
