= Toma Zdravković =

Serbian singer (1938–1991)

Toma Zdravković Тома Здравковић
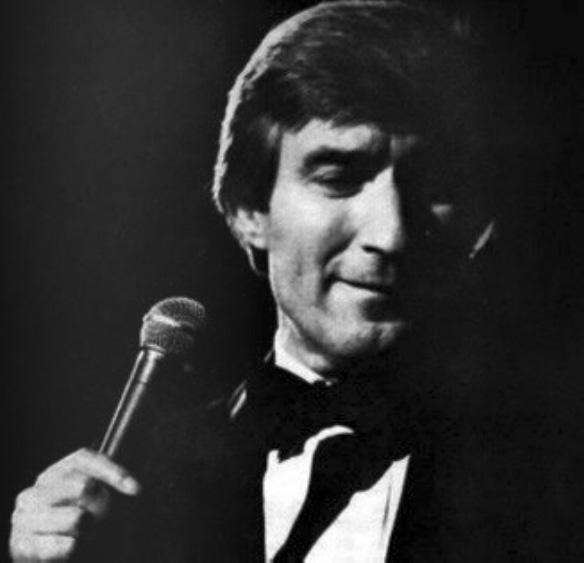

Background information
- Also known as: Toma
- Born: Tomislav Zdravković; 20 November 1938; Aleksinac, Kingdom of Yugoslavia
- Died: 30 September 1991 (aged 52) Belgrade, SR Serbia, SFR Yugoslavia
- Genres: Folk, pop-folk
- Occupation: Musician
- Years active: 1958–1991

Tomislav "Toma" Zdravković (Serbian Cyrillic: Томислав "Тома" Здравковић; 20 November 1938 – 30 September 1991) was a Serbian singer-songwriter and recording artist.

Zdravković has been described as a bohemian. His songs, although having the form of Serbian folk music, had the spirit of chansons. He had a characteristic baritone vocal, not too powerful but warm, resembling that of Charles Aznavour. Most of the lyrics were written by Zdravković, devoted to unfortunate love, and love-suffering while drinking and singing in omnipresent kafanas. He was married four times.

Some of Zdravković's most renowned songs are "Prokleta nedelja" (lit. 'Cursed Sunday'), "Dotak’o sam dno života" (lit. 'I've Touched the Bottom of Life'), "Ostala je samo uspomena" (lit. 'Only a Memory Remained'), "Pustite me da živim svoj život" (lit. 'Let Me Live My Life'), "Dva smo sveta različita" (lit. 'We're Two Different Worlds') and testimonial Pesme moje (My Songs).

== Career ==
Tomislav Zdravković, nicknamed "Toma", was born in Aleksinac, and lived in Pečenjevce near Leskovac in Serbia, at the time part of the Kingdom of Yugoslavia. His father was Dušan and his mother Kosara. His parents had five children, Tomislav being one of the elder children (including his brother and fellow folk singer Novica Zdravković). The family spent most of Zdravković's life in poverty. There was a high rate of unemployment in his village, thus when he turned 18, he decided to look for a job as a singer in the town of Leskovac. He eventually became a singer in a kafana in Leskovac called "Dubočica". Afterwards, he moved to Tuzla, Bosnia and Herzegovina where he sang in the Hotel Bristol.

Zdravković's first album was named Essagerata, released in 1964. That year, his first true love, a girl named Slavica who Toma loved, died prematurely at the age of 20 after a serious illness. Zdravković wrote a song named "Buket belih ruža" (A Bouquet of White Roses), dedicated to her, which is still considered his saddest song.

In 1969 he attended the "Ilidža 1969" music festival, and won the second place with the song "Odlazi, odlazi". Later, around 100,000 copies of the album were sold. And, when Zdravković wrote a song for his friend, Meho Puzić, and it sold around 500,000 copies.

In 1969, he and Silvana Armenulić sang in the same group, and Zdravković, to express his gratitude to her for helping him launch his musical career, wrote the song “Šta će mi život". The song became one of the biggest folk hits ever written in Yugoslavia and transformed Armenulić, and Zdravković himself, into superstars. Zdravković later published his own version of the song.

== Personal life ==
Zdravković was married four times. He met his fourth wife, Gordana, in Toronto, Canada after visiting the United States and Canada in order to receive treatment for bladder cancer in 1973. With Gordana, he had one son, named Alexander.

== Return to Yugoslavia ==
Zdravković returned to Yugoslavia and published a song "Umoran sam od života" ("I am tired of life") and immediately became a best-selling artist again.

In 1982, he held his first concert in the Belgrade Dom Sindikata, after 26 years of singing. He sang his major hits like "Danka", "Ciganka" ("A little Gypsy girl"), "Prokleta nedelja" ("Damned Sunday").

He acted in the movie "Balkan Express" and in the TV series "Doktorka na selu".

In 1987, he organized a farewell tour. He held his last concert in Podgorica, Montenegro.

== Death ==
After 17 years of battle with prostate cancer, Toma Zdravković died on Monday, 30 September 1991, aged 52, in Military Medical Academy, Belgrade.

A musical biopic of his life entitled Toma premiered at the Sarajevo Film Festival in 2021.

== Discography ==
This is a list of all the singles, extended plays, and albums that Toma Zdravković recorded during his lifetime:

- Essagerata (1964)
- Dan po dan prolazi (1965)
- Cvetak mali s rosom razgovara (Duet With Milina Stefanović) (1967)
- Detelina sa četiri lista (Duet With Milina Stefanović) (1967)
- Nedžmija (1968)
- Ciganka (1968)
- A nemam baš nigde nikog na ovom svetu (1968)
- Kamena stena (1968)
- Odlazi, odlazi (1969)
- Dok tebe nisam sreo (1969)
- Sliku tvoju ljubim (1970)
- Boli, boli, boli (1970)
- Kad se voli, što se rastaje (1970)
- Pesma o Kitty Swan (Duet With Kitty Swan) (1970)
- Dete Ulice (1970)
- Što te večeras nema (1971)
- Poslednje pismo (1971)
- Živorade (1972)
- O majko, majko (1973)
- Prokleta Nedelja (1973)
- Petlovi poje (1973)
- Sutra se vraćam kuči (1974)
- Nikad neću da te zaboravim (1976)
- Jugoslavijo (1978)
- Umoran sam od života (1979)
- Majko, vrati se (1979)
- Zbogom moja mladosti (1980)
- Mirjana (1980)
- Čekaj me (1981)
- Dva smo sveta različita (1983)
- Dotakao sam dno života (1984)
- E, moje brate (Duet With Novica Zdravković) (1986)
- Dal je moguće (1987)
- Evo me opet (1988)
- Kafana je moja istina (1990)
- Odlazi, odlazi (1991)
