= Jasmin Muharemović =

Bosnian singer (born 1965)

Jasmin Muharemović (born 22 February 1965) is a Bosnian pop-folk singer.

In 1983 he moved in Požarevac in order to meet Novica Urošević, the folk hit-maker, and start a professional folk singer career. Muharemović's first album sold 250,000 copies, and he had great success as a beginner. In 1994, due to the war in his home country, formerly a part of Yugoslavia, he moved to Vienna. He lives between Vienna and his birth city Tešanj. He has three sisters and three brothers, one brother being the singer Esad Plavi.

== Discography ==
- Ja sam taj (1987, Diskos) *composed by Novica Urošević
- Prvi momak (1988, Diskos) *composed by Novica Urošević
- Osvajač (1989, Diskos) *composed by Novica Urošević
- Bolje ljubav, nego rat (1991, Diskos) *composed by Novica Urošević
- Sve me boli (1994)
- Crna ženo (1995)
- Vjernost i nevjersnost (1998) *composed by Novica Urošević
- Ginem, ginem (1999)
- Nešto nemoguće (2001)
- Jasmina (2003)
- Žilet (2005)
- Ubaci me u mašinu (2007)
- Ljubav mala, briga velika (2010)
