= List of Bosniaks =

This is a list of historical and living Bosniaks who are famous or notable.

== Academics ==
=== A–M ===
- Adil Zulfikarpašić, politician and intellectual
- Aida Hadžialić, Swedish youngest minister ever
- Asim Peco, linguist and academic
- Edina Lekovic, Director of Policy & Programming at the Muslim Public Affairs Council
- Emir Vildić, academic musician
- Enver Redžić, historian, cultural observer, publisher, professor
- Faruk Čaklovica, Professor of Bromatology and Rector of the University of Sarajevo
- Ferid Muhić, Professor of Philosophy
- Hasan Muratović, former rector of the University of Sarajevo
- Kemal Gekić, professor of piano at the Florida International University
- Rifat Rastoder, politician, writer and journalist
- Metin Boşnak, scholar of American Studies and Comparative Literature
- Muhamed Filipović, historian and philosopher
- Muhamed Hadžijahić, historian
- Mustafa Imamović, historian
- Mina Aganagić, mathematical physicist

=== N–Z ===
- Nasiha Kapidžić-Hadžić, children's book author and poet
- Nijaz Duraković, author, intellectual, professor and politician
- Nijaz Ibrulj, philosopher and a professor at the University of Sarajevo's Department of Philosophy and Sociology
- Endi E. Poskovic, Professor at the University of Michigan School of Art and Design and Associate Faculty at the University of Michigan Center for Russian, East European, and Eurasian Studies (CREES)
- Seada Palavrić, judge of the Constitutional Court of Bosnia and Herzegovina
- Senahid Halilović, linguist
- Smail Balić, Austrian historian and culturologist of Bosniak origin
- Šemso Tucaković, writer, historian and faculty member in the Department of Political Sciences at the University of Sarajevo.
- Šerbo Rastoder, historian
- Zijad Delic, Bosnian-Canadian Imam, activist, teacher, scholar and public speaker

== Artists ==
=== A–M ===
- Adi Granov, comic book artist
- Endi E. Poskovic, Bosnian-American artist and printmaker
- Kemal Curić, Bosnian automobile designer
- Mersad Berber, painter

=== N–Z ===
- Nela Hasanbegović, sculptor
- Nesim Tahirović, painter, sculptor
- Omer Halilhodžić, Bosnian automobile designer
- Safet Zec, painter, graphic designer
- Selma Harrington, Bosnian-born architect and designer who currently lives in Dublin, Ireland

== Music ==
=== Composers ===
- Dino Zonić, composer and conductor

=== Opera ===
- Jasmin Bašić (born 1971)
- Aida Čorbadžić (born 1976)
- Bahrija Nuri Hadžić (1904–1993)

=== Pop ===
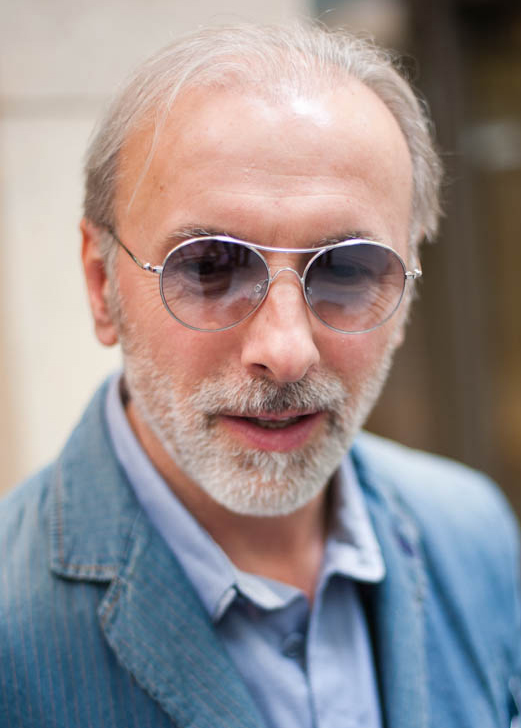
Dino Merlin, leading pop singer

- Anabela Atijas (born 1975), father was a Bosniak
- Adnan Babajić (born 1988)
- Alma Čardžić (born 1968)
- Amila Glamočak (born 1966)
- Dalal Midhat-Talakić (born 1981)
- Danijel Alibabić, Montenegrin singer with a Bosniak father
- Deen (born 1982)
- Denial Ahmetović (born 1995)
- Dino Merlin (born 1962)
- Donna Ares (1977–2017)
- Dua Lipa, maternal grandmother is Bosniak
- Dženy (born 1987)
- Eldin Huseinbegović (born 1978)
- Elvir Mekić (born 1981)
- Emina Jahović (born 1982)
- Fazla (born 1967)
- Indira (born 1973), mother is a Bosniak
- Kemal Monteno (1948–2015)
- La Lana (born 1984), mother is a Bosniak
- Lepa Brena (born 1960)
- Maya Sar (born 1981)
- Mirza Šoljanin (born 1985)
- Nino Pršeš
- Peter Nalitch (born 1981), Russian singer whose grandfather was a Bosniak
- Rialda (born 1992)
- Sabahudin Kurt (1935–2018)
- Seka Aleksić (born 1981), mother was a Bosniak
- Selma Bajrami (born 1980), mother was a Bosniak
- Selma Muhedinović (born 1972)
- Senidah (born 1985), Slovenian singer whose parents were Bosniaks
- Zuzi Zu (born 1978)

=== Rock ===
- Alen Islamović (born 1957)
- Branko Đurić (born 1962), mother was a Bosniak
- Cem Adrian (born 1980), Turkish singer of Bosniak ancestry
- Elvir Laković Laka (born 1969)
- Hari Varešanović (born 1961)
- Sead Lipovača (born 1955)
- Seid Memić (born 1950)
- Tibor & Sanin Karamehmedović

=== Rap ===
- Buba Corelli (born 1989)
- Edo Maajka (born 1978)
- Frenkie (born 1982)
- Jala Brat (born 1986)

=== Sevdalinka ===
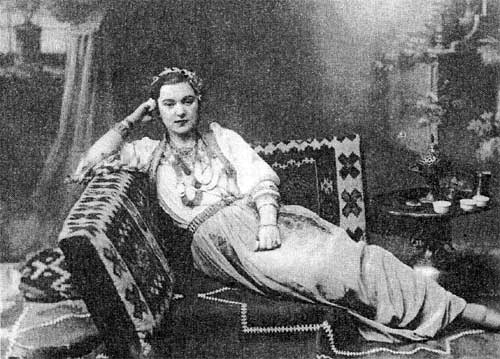
Umihana Čuvidina (1794–1870), a 19th-century poet who sang some of her poems as sevdalinkas

- Beba Selimović (1936–2020)
- Damir Imamović (born 1978)
- Dina Bajraktarević (born 1953)
- Emina Zečaj (1929–2020)
- Hanka Paldum (born 1956)
- Meho Puzić (1937–2007)
- Safet Isović (1936–2007)
- Zaim Imamović (1920–1994)
- Zehra Deović (1938–2015)
- Zekerijah Đezić (1937–2002)

=== Folk ===
- Al' Dino (born 1970), singer-songwriter and composer
- Asim Brkan (born 1954)
- Elvira Rahić (born 1975)
- Enes Begović (born 1965)
- Esad Plavi (born 1965)
- Halid Bešlić (born 1953)
- Halid Muslimović (born 1960)
- Haris Džinović (born 1951)
- Jasmin Muharemović (born 1965)
- Kemal Malovčić (born 1946)
- Osman Hadžić (born 1966)
- Nihad Alibegović (born 1962)
- Nino Rešić (1964–2007)
- Sanela Sijerčić
- Šaban Šaulić (1951–2019)
- Šako Polumenta (born 1960)
- Šemsa Suljaković (born 1951)
- Šerif Konjević (born 1957)

=== Guitarist ===
- Denis Azabagić (born 1972), classical guitarist

=== Lutenist ===
- Edin Karamazov (born 1965)

=== Songwriters ===
- Edo Mulahalilović (1964–2010)
- Fahrudin Pecikoza (born 1962)

== Cinematography and theatre ==
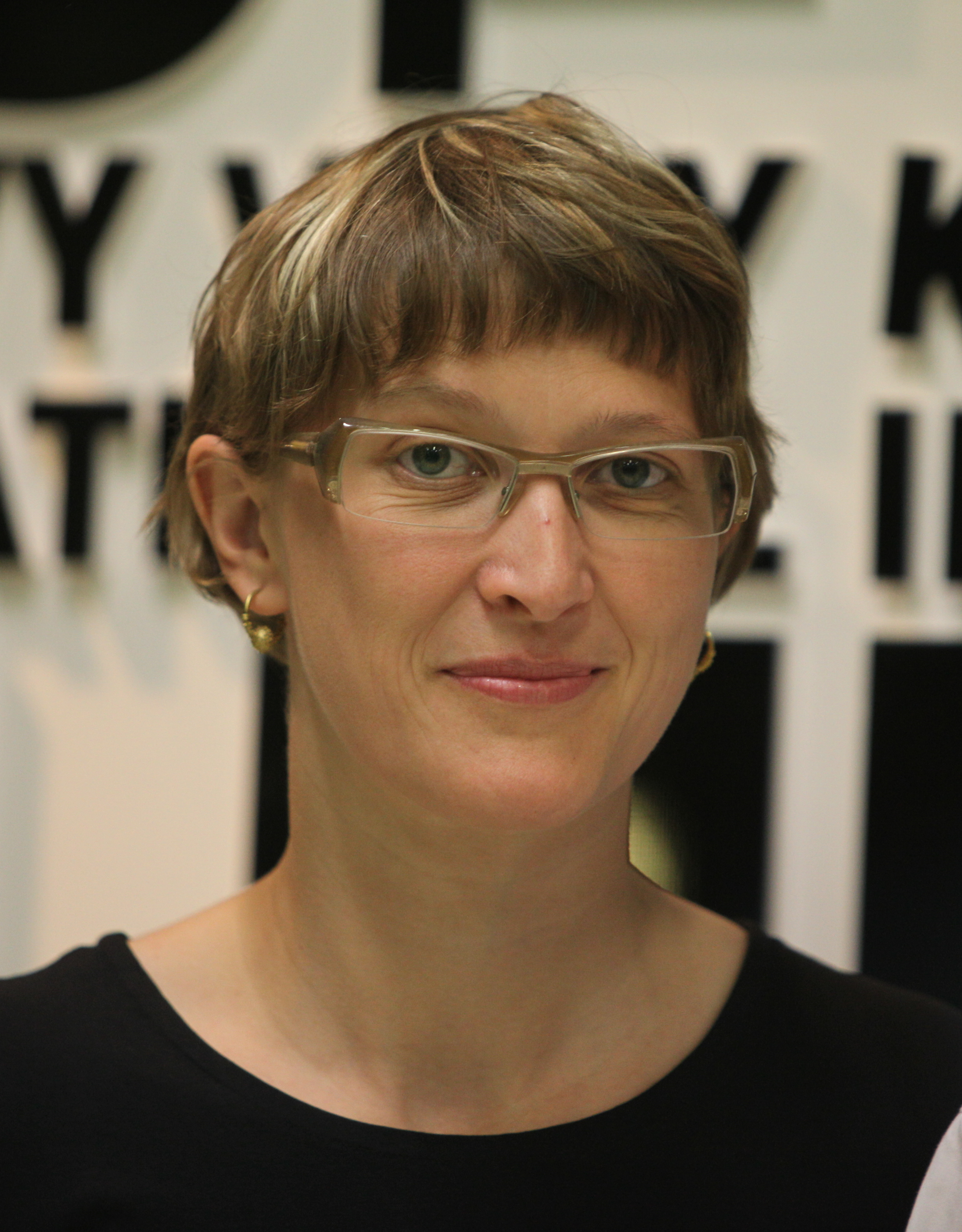
Jasmila Žbanić

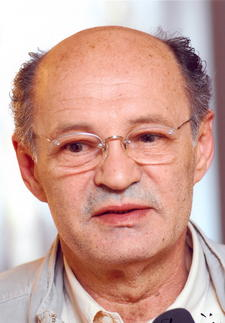
Mustafa Nadarević

=== A–M ===
- Ademir Kenović (born 1950), director and producer
- Adnan Hasković (born 1984), actor
- Ahmed Imamović (born 1971), director, producer and screenwriter
- Ajla Hodžić (born 1980), actress
- Amra Silajdžić (born 1984), actress and model
- Bahrudin Čengić (1931–2007), film director and screenwriter
- Benjamin Filipović (1962–2006), filmmaker
- Damir Nikšić (born 1970), conceptual artist
- Danis Tanović (born 1969), filmmaker
- Elmir Jukić (born 1971), director
- Emir Hadžihafizbegović (born 1961), actor
- Enis Bešlagić (born 1975), actor
- Fadil Hadžić (1922–2011), film director
- Faruk Sokolović (born 1952), film director, producer, actor and screenwriter
- Haris Dubica, director
- Haris Pašović (born 1961), theatre and film director
- Husein Aličajić, filmmaker
- Idda van Munster (born 1990), pin-up and model
- Ismet Horo (born 1959), comedian
- Izudin Bajrović (born 1963), actor
- Jasmila Žbanić (born 1974), filmmaker
- Jasmin Dizdar (born 1961), filmmaker
- Kıvanç Tatlıtuğ (born 1983), actor and model (Tatlıtuğ's paternal grandmother was an ethnic Bosniak)
- Mustafa Nadarević (1943–2020) actor

=== N–Z ===
- Reshad Strik (born 1981), Australian actor of Bosniak descent
- Sabina Vajrača (born 1977), director, screenwriter, producer
- Selma Alispahić (born 1970), actress
- Senad Bašić (born 1962), actor
- Sunny Suljic (born 2005), American actor of Bosniak descent
- Sulejman Medenčević (born 1963), producer
- Tahir Nikšić (born 1950), actor
- Tarik Filipović (born 1972), actor
- Zaim Muzaferija (1923–2003), actor
- Zana Marjanović (born 1983), actress
- Zijah Sokolović (born 1950), actor, writer, director
- Zlatko Topčić (born 1955), screenwriter and playwright

== Criminals ==
- Hazim Delić, Bosnian War criminal
- Ismet Bajramović, Bosnian soldier and organised crime figure
- Ramiz Delalić, one of several prominent underworld figures who helped defend Sarajevo
- Mušan Topalović, Commander during the Bosnian war and a gangster
- Jusuf Prazina, Sarajevan gangster and paramilitary warlord during the Bosnian War
- Šefka Hodžić, convicted of the 1969 murder of her pregnant friend

== Literature ==
=== A–M ===
- Abdulah Sidran, poet and screenwriter
- Alija Isaković, essayist, publicist, playwright, and lexicographer of the Bosnian language
- Bisera Alikadić, poet and author, best known for her work Larva and Krug
- Dževad Karahasan, awarded writer and philosopher
- Edvin Kanka Ćudić, writer and leader of the UDIK
- Faruk Šehić, poet, novelist and short story writer
- Mehmed Kapetanović, writer and public official who founded the influential political journal Bošnjak ("Bosniak")

=== N–Z ===
- Nasiha Kapidžić-Hadžić, children's author and poet
- Nedžad Ibrišimović, writer and sculptor
- Nihad Hasanović, writer and translator
- Nura Bazdulj-Hubijar, novelist, poet and playwright
- Safet Plakalo, playwright, journalist and theatre critic
- Semezdin Mehmedinović, writer and filmmaker but also a magazine editor
- Zlatko Topčić, awarded writer and screenwriter

== Politicians ==
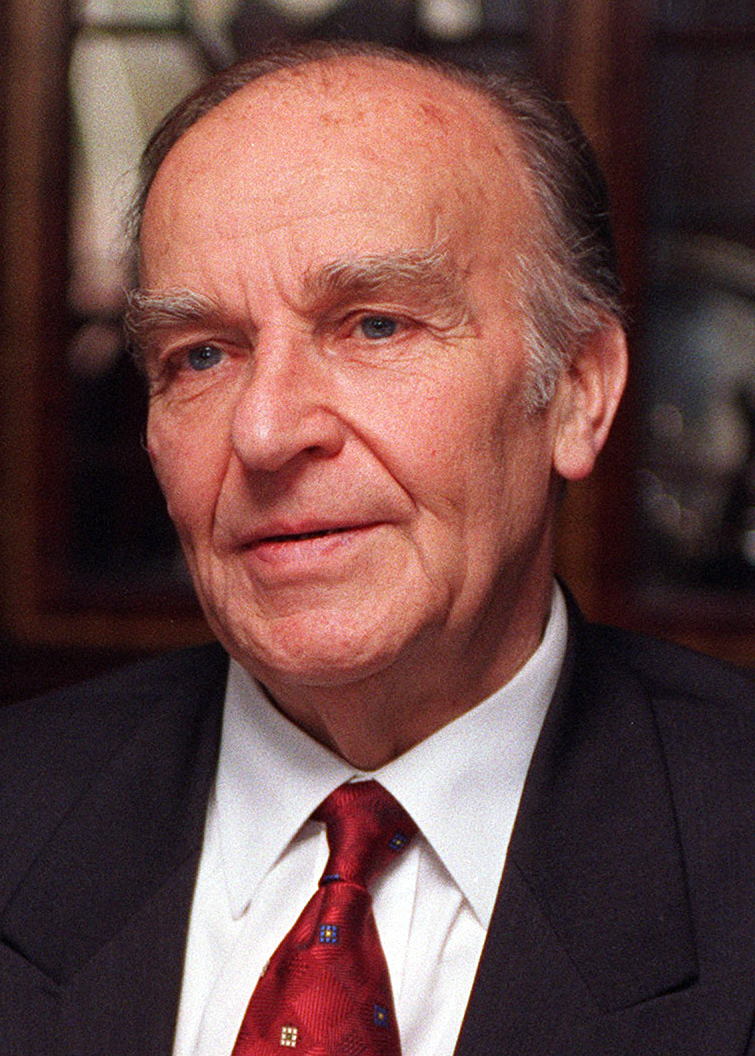
Alija Izetbegović

=== A–M ===
- Adem Huskić (born 1955), member of the House of Representatives in Bosnia and Herzegovina
- Adil Zulfikarpašić (1921–2008), politician and intellectual
- Adnan Terzić (born 1960), former Prime Minister
- Ahmet Hadžipašić (1952–2008), former prime minister of the Federation of Bosnia and Herzegovina
- Aida Hadžialić, Swedish youngest minister ever
- Alija Behmen (1940–2018), Mayor of Sarajevo
- Alija Izetbegović (1925–2003), served as president of Bosnia and Herzegovina
- Arminka Helic, Special Adviser (SPAD) and Chief of Staff to the British Foreign Secretary William Hague.
- Bakir Izetbegović (born 1956), politician and son of Alija Izetbegović
- Beriz Belkić (1946–2023), politician
- Bisera Turković (born 1954), Bosniak diplomat
- Ed Husic (born 1970), Australian federal politician
- Ervin Ibrahimović, politician
- Ejup Ganić (born 1946), President of the Federation of Bosnia and Herzegovina from 1997 to 1999, 2000 to 2001
- Fikret Abdić (born 1939), served as President of former Autonomous Province of Western Bosnia
- Hamdija Lipovača (born 1976), Prime Minister of the Una-Sana Canton from 2010 to 2014
- Haris Silajdžić (born 1945), served as prime minister and president of Bosnia and Herzegovina
- Hasan Čengić (born 1957), former Deputy Prime Minister and Defense Minister of the Federation of Bosnia and Herzegovina
- Ibran Mustafić (born 1960), politician and former soldier
- Irfan Ljubijankić (1952–1995), Minister of Foreign Affairs 1993–95
- Jasmin Imamović (born 1957), mayor of Tuzla since 2001
- Mehmed Kapetanović (1839–1902), 2nd mayor of Sarajevo
- Mustafa Mujezinović (politician) (1954–2019), former Prime Minister of the Federation of Bosnia and Herzegovina

=== N–Z ===
- Nedžad Branković (born 1962), Bosnian politician
- Omer Behmen (1922–2009), co-founder of the Party of Democratic Action
- Rafet Husović, former political leader of the Bosniak party in Montenegro
- Raif Dizdarević (1926–2026), Yugoslav president 1988–89
- Rasim Ljajić (born 1964), Bosniak politician in Serbia
- Rifat Rastoder (born 1950), deputy speaker of the Parliament of Montenegro and the vice-president of the Social Democratic Party of Montenegro
- Sabina Ćudić, (born 1982), a Bosnian politician who is vice-president of the political party Naša stranka; Member of the House of Representatives of Parliament of the Federation of Bosnia and Herzegovina
- Sanjin Halimović (born 1969), involved in Sanski Most politics
- Safet Babic (born 1981), German politician of Bosniak descent
- Selim Bešlagić (born 1942), mayor of Tuzla 1990–2001
- Semiha Borovac (born 1955), former mayor of Sarajevo and Sarajevo's only female mayor
- Sulejman Tihić (1951–2014), leader of the Party of Democratic Action and former president
- Sulejman Ugljanin (born 1953), Bosniak politician in Serbia
- Šahbaz Džihanović (born 1949), vice President of the Federation of Bosnia and Herzegovina
- Zlatko Lagumdžija (born 1955), former Foreign Minister
- Muamer Zukorlić (1970–2021), Bosniak politician and Islamic theologian, founder of the SPP political party and Grand Mufti of the Islamic Community of Sandžak from 1993 to 2016

== Theologians ==
- Šefko Omerbašić (1945–2024), Mufti and president of the Islamic Community in Croatia and Slovenia

== Historical figures ==
- Fata Orlović (born 1942), woman in legal battle with Republika Srpska over church illegally built on her property

== Businesspeople ==
- Cem Uzan, businessman
- Fahrudin Radončić, businessman and owner of Dnevni Avaz
- Hakija Turajlić, businessman, economist and politician
- Irfan Škiljan, creator of IrfanView
- Kemal Kozarić, governor of the Central Bank of Bosnia and Herzegovina
- Muhamed Sacirbey, Bosnian-American lawyer, businessman and diplomat
- Sanela Diana Jenkins, entrepreneur and philanthropist
- Selma Prodanović, entrepreneur and philanthropist

== Sportspeople ==
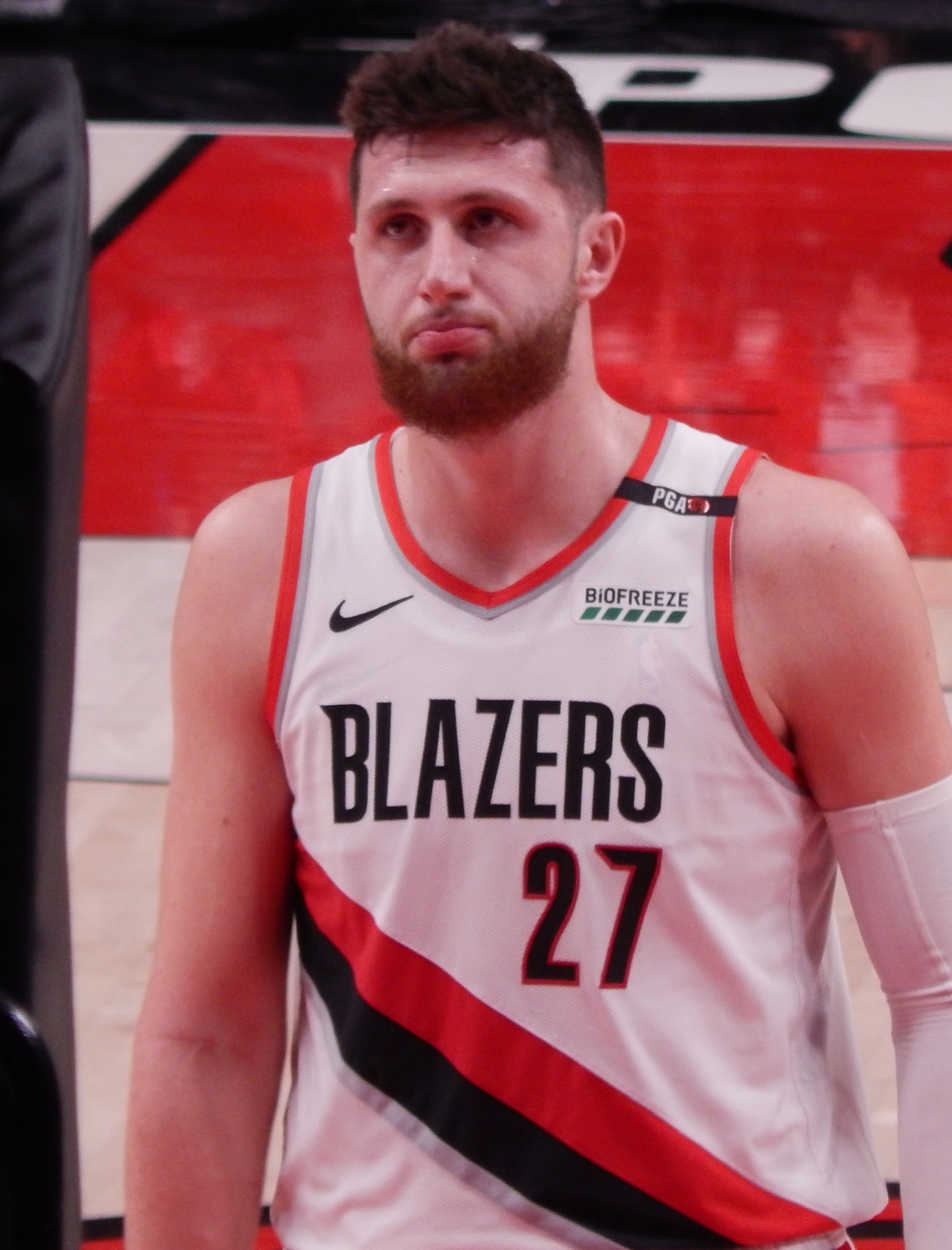
Jusuf Nurkić

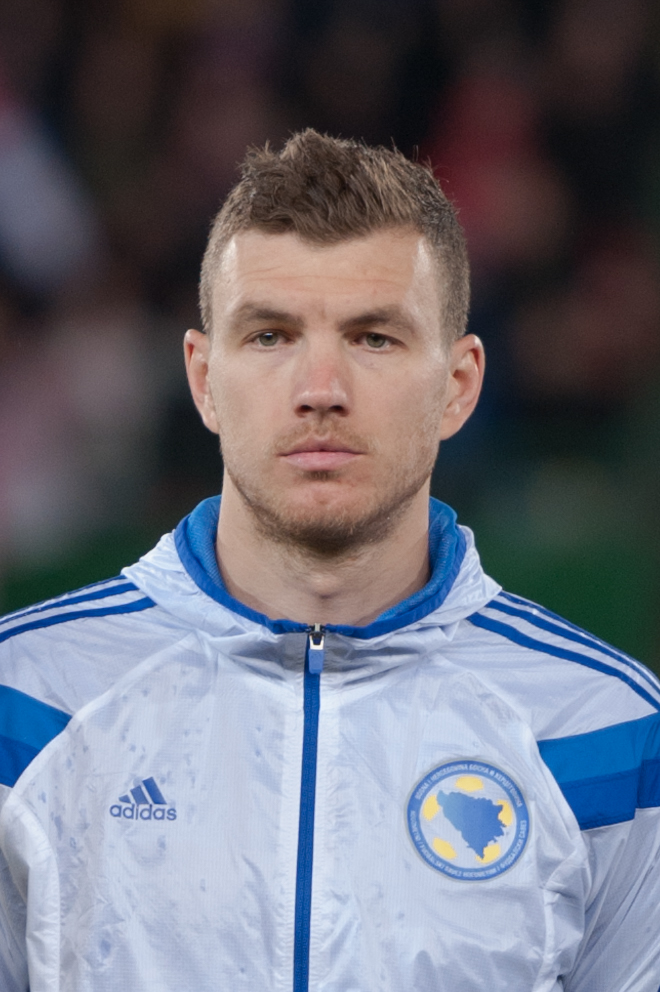
Edin Džeko

=== Basketball ===
- Damir Mršić, basketball player
- Damir Mulaomerović, basketball player
- Džanan Musa, basketball player
- Emir Mutapčić, basketball player
- Emir Preldžić, basketball player
- Emir Sulejmanović, basketball player
- Hidayet Turkoglu, basketball player
- Jusuf Nurkić, basketball player
- Mirsad Turkcan, basketball player
- Mirza Delibašić, former basketball player and FIBA Hall of Fame
- Mirza Teletović, basketball player
- Nihad Đedović, basketball player
- Razija Mujanović, basketball player
- Sabahudin Bilalović, basketball player
- Sead Šehović, basketball player
- Suad Šehović, basketball player

=== Football ===
- Adem Ljajić, football player
- Adnan Kovačević, football player
- Adis Jasić, football player
- Alen Bašić, football player
- Dženis Burnić, German football player
- Amar Dedić, football player
- Amer Gojak, football player
- Amir Hadžiahmetović, football player
- Anel Ahmedhodžić, football player
- Asim Ferhatović, football player
- Asmir Begović, football player
- Benjamin Tahirović, football player
- Besim Šerbečić, football player
- Darijo Srna, football player (Bosniak father, Croatian mother)
- Dennis Hadžikadunić, football player
- Edin Džeko, football player
- Edin Terzić, football coach and former player (Bosniak father, Croatian mother)
- Edin Višća, football player
- Eldar Ćivić, football player
- Elvir Baljić, football player
- Elvir Bolić, football player
- Enver Marić, football player
- Ermedin Demirović, football player
- Ermin Gadžo, football player
- Ervin Zukanović, football player
- Faruk Hadžibegić, football manager and former player
- Haris Duljević, football player
- Haris Seferović, football player
- Hasan Salihamidžić, football player
- Ibrahim Šehić, football player
- Jasmin Burić, football player
- Jasmin Mešanović, football player
- Jusuf Gazibegović, football player
- Kenan Kodro, football player
- Kenan Pirić, football player
- Mehmed Baždarević, football player
- Meho Kodro, football player
- Miralem Pjanić, football player
- Mirsad Hibić, football player
- Muhamed Bešić, football player
- Muhamed Konjić, football player
- Muhamed Mujić, football player
- Muhammed Cham Saračević (born 2000), Senegalese father, Bosniak mother, represents Austria
- Mustafa Hasanagić, football player
- Safet Sušić, football player
- Sanjin Prcić, football player
- Sead Hakšabanović, football player
- Sead Kolašinac, football player
- Sejad Salihović, football player
- Senad Lulić, football player
- Sergej Barbarez, football player (Bosnian Serb father, Bosniak mother)
- Smail Prevljak, football player
- Vahid Halilhodžić, football player
- Vedad Ibišević, football player
- Zlatan Bajramović, football player
- Zlatan Ibrahimović, football player (Bosniak father, Croatian mother)

=== Handball ===
- Alen Muratović, handball player
- Abas Arslanagić, handball player
- Benjamin Burić, handball player
- Bilal Šuman, handball player
- Edin Bašić, handball player
- Enid Tahirović, handball player
- Ermin Velić, handball player
- Irfan Smajlagić, handball player
- Majda Mehmedović, handball player
- Mirsad Terzić, handball player
- Mirza Džomba, handball player
- Muhamed Memić, handball player
- Muhamed Toromanović, handball player
- Sead Hasanefendić, handball player

=== Volleyball ===
- Adis Lagumdžija, volleyball player
- Asim Medić, volleyball player
- Nizam Čančar, volleyball player
- Sabahudin Delalić, volleyball player

=== Cycling ===
- Irvin Hušić, cyclist
- Seid Lizde, cyclist
- Vedad Karić, cyclist

=== Martial arts ===
- Arnela Odžaković, karateka
- Almedin Fetahović, boxer
- Amer Hrustanović, wrestler
- Amel Mekić, judoka
- Damir Hadžović, mixed martial artist
- Dževad Poturak, kickboxer
- Arian Sadiković, kickboxer
- Enad Ličina, boxer
- Felix Sturm, boxer
- Hamid Guska, boxer
- Larisa Cerić, judoka
- Marco Huck, boxer
- Memnun Hadžić, boxer
- Mirsad Bektić, mixed martial artist
- Nedžad Husić, taekwondo

=== Tennis ===
- Amer Delić, tennis player
- Damir Džumhur, tennis player
- Mirza Bašić, tennis player

=== Other ===
- Almir Velagić, weightlifter
- Amel Tuka, track and field athlete
- Dino Beganovic, Swedish-Bosnian racing driver
- Hamza Alić, shot putter
- Irvin Tahmaz, long jumper

== Scientists, medicine and inventors ==
- Asim Kurjak, physician, gynecologist
- Asim Peco, linguist and professor of philology at the University of Belgrade
- Rifat Hadžiselimović, geneticist

== Military ==
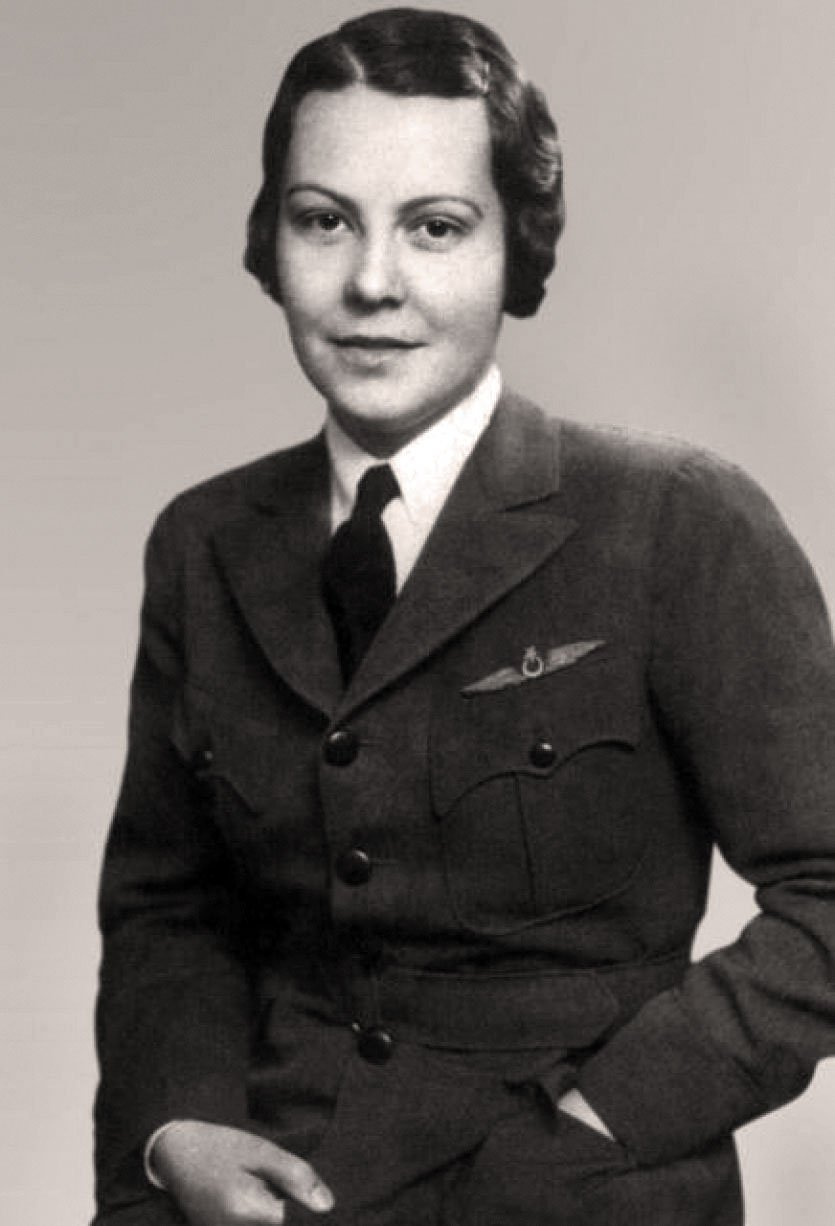
Sabiha Gökçen

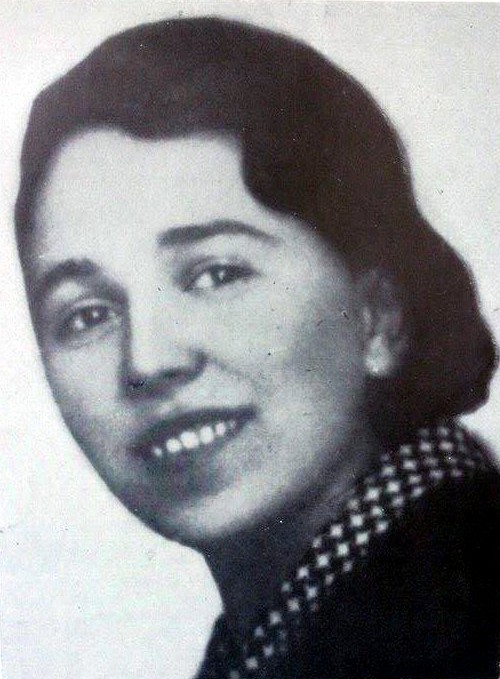
Vahida Maglajlić

=== A–M ===
- Ahmet Sejdić, commander of the First Visegrad Brigade of the Army of Bosnia and Herzegovina
- Arif Pašalić, Bosnian military officer who commanded the 4th Corps of the Army of Bosnia and Herzegovina
- Atif Dudaković, former general in the Bosnian Army
- Avdo Palić, Bosnian military officer during the Bosnian War
- Enver Hadžihasanović, general of the Army of the Republic of Bosnia and Herzegovina
- Izet Nanić, Bosnian brigade commander
- Mehmed Alagić, former general in the Army of the Republic of Bosnia and Herzegovina
- Mušan Topalović, commander of the 10th Mountain Brigade in the Army of Bosnia and Herzegovina
- Mustafa Hajrulahović Talijan, general of the Bosnian Army
- Mustafa Polutak

=== N–Z ===
- Naser Orić, war-time military officer
- Ramiz Delalić, commander of 9th Mountain Brigade in Sarajevo
- Rasim Delić, former general and commander in the Bosnian Army
- Sabiha Gökçen, first Turkish female combat pilot
- Sefer Halilović, former general and commander in the Bosnian Army, politician
- Zaim Imamović, commander of the Army of Bosnia and Herzegovina forces in Goražde during the Bosnian War

== Militants ==
- Sabina Selimovic and Samra Kesinovic, ISIS brides

== Other ==
- Dina Džanković (born 1986), Miss Serbia and Montenegro in 2005
- Hasan Čemalović (born 1947), architect
- Hasan Nuhanović (born 1968), survivor of the Srebrenica genocide
- Himzo Selimović (born 1961), former head of the Ministry of Security
- Inela Nogić (born 1976), won the 1993 Miss Sarajevo beauty pageant
- Irvin Mujčić (born 1987), human rights activist, tour guide, and survivor of the Srebrenica genocide
- Kemal Kurspahić (born 1946), Managing Editor of The Connection Newspapers
- Omer Halilhodžić (born 1963), automotive designer
- Semir Osmanagić (born 1960), author, businessman and pseudoarchaeologist

== See also ==
- List of Bosnians
- List of Bosniak Sportspeople
- Bosnian people category
