= List of Bosniak musicians =

This is a list of Bosniak composers, musical groups, musicians and singers:

== Composers ==
- Alexander von Zemlinsky (1871–1942), Austrian composer and conductor who had a Bosniak maternal grandmother
- Dino Zonić, composer and conductor
- Ismet Alajbegović Šerbo (1925–1987), composer, songwriter and accordionist

== Genre ==
=== Opera ===
- Sandra Bagarić (born 1979)
- Jasmin Bašić (born 1971)
- Aida Čorbadžić (born 1976)
- Bahrija Nuri Hadžić (1904–1993)

=== Pop ===
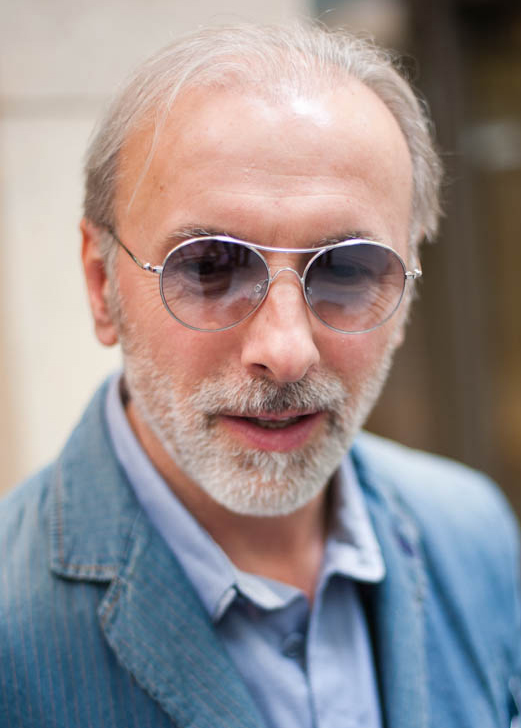
Dino Merlin, leading pop singer

- Anabela Atijas (born 1975), father was a Bosniak
- Adnan Babajić (born 1988)
- Alma Čardžić (born 1968)
- Amila Glamočak (born 1966)
- Dalal Midhat-Talakić (born 1981)
- Danijel Alibabić, Montenegrin singer with a Bosniak father
- Deen (born 1982)
- Denial Ahmetović (born 1995)
- Dino Merlin (born 1962)
- Donna Ares (1977–2017)
- Dženy (born 1987)
- Eldin Huseinbegović (born 1978)
- Elvir Mekić (born 1981)
- Emina Jahović (born 1982)
- Fazla (born 1967)
- Kemal Monteno (1948–2015)
- Lepa Brena (born 1960)
- Maya Sar (born 1981)
- Mirza Šoljanin (born 1985)
- Nino Pršeš
- Peter Nalitch (born 1981), Russian singer whose grandfather was a Bosniak
- Rialda (born 1992)
- Sabahudin Kurt (1935–2018)
- Seka Aleksić (born 1981), mother was a Bosniak
- Selma Bajrami (born 1980), mother was a Bosniak
- Selma Muhedinović (born 1972)
- Senidah (born 1985), Slovenian singer whose parents were Bosniaks
- Zuzi Zu (born 1978)

=== Rock ===
- Alen Islamović (born 1957)
- Branko Đurić (born 1962), mother was a Bosniak
- Cem Adrian (born 1980), Turkish singer of Bosniak ancestry
- Elvir Laković Laka (born 1969)
- Hari Varešanović (born 1961)
- Sead Lipovača (born 1955)
- Seid Memić (born 1950)

=== Rap ===
- Buba Corelli (born 1989)
- Edo Maajka (born 1978)
- Frenkie (born 1982)
- Jala Brat (born 1986)

=== Sevdalinka ===
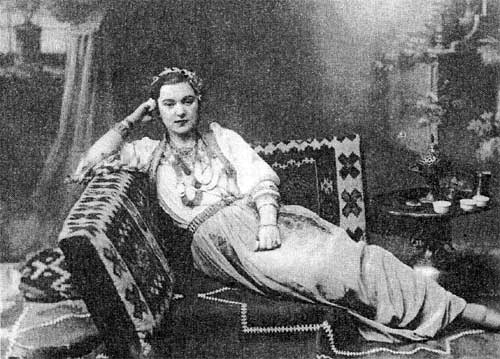
Umihana Čuvidina (1794–1870), a 19th-century poet who sang some of her poems as sevdalinkas

- Beba Selimović (1936–2020)
- Damir Imamović (born 1978)
- Dina Bajraktarević (born 1953)
- Emina Zečaj (1929–2020)
- Hanka Paldum (born 1956)
- Himzo Polovina (1927–1986), father was a Bosniak
- Meho Puzić (1937–2007)
- Mirsada Bajraktarević (1951–1976)
- Rešad Bešlagić (1909–1945)
- Safet Isović (1936–2007)
- Silvana Armenulić (1938–1976)
- Umihana Čuvidina (1794–1870)
- Zaim Imamović (1920–1994)
- Zehra Deović (1938–2015)
- Zekerijah Đezić (1937–2002)

=== Folk ===
- Al' Dino (born 1970), singer-songwriter and composer
- Asim Brkan (born 1954)
- Elvira Rahić (born 1975)
- Enes Begović (born 1965)
- Esad Plavi (born 1965)
- Halid Bešlić (1953-2025)
- Halid Muslimović (born 1960)
- Haris Džinović (born 1951)
- Jasmin Muharemović (born 1965)
- Kemal Malovčić (born 1946)
- Osman Hadžić (born 1966)
- Nihad Alibegović (born 1962)
- Nino Rešić (1964–2007)
- Sanela Sijerčić (born 1976)
- Šaban Šaulić (1951–2019)
- Šako Polumenta (born 1960)
- Šemsa Suljaković (born 1949)
- Šerif Konjević (born 1957)
- Zehra Bajraktarević (born 1968)

== Guitarist ==
- Denis Azabagić (born 1972), classical guitarist

== Lutenist ==
- Edin Karamazov (born 1965)

== Songwriters ==
- Edo Mulahalilović (1964–2010)
- Fahrudin Pecikoza (born 1962)

== See also ==
- List of Bosniaks
- List of Bosniak writers
