= List of Bosniak sportspeople =

This is a list of historical and living Bosniaks (of Bosnia or the Bosnian diaspora) who are famous or notable sportspeople.

== Basketball ==
- Adnan Hodžić
- Adin Vrabac
- Asım Pars
- Damir Mršić
- Damir Mulaomerović
- Dino Murić
- Džanan Musa
- Edin Bavčić
- Edo Murić
- Elmedin Kikanović
- Emir Mutapčić
- Emir Preldžič
- Emir Sulejmanović
- Hasan Rizvić
- Hedo Türkoğlu
- Jasmin Hukić
- Jusuf Nurkić
- Kenan Bajramović
- Memi Bečirovič
- Mirsad Türkcan (Jahović)
- Mirza Begić
- Mirza Delibašić
- Mirza Teletović
- Nedžad Sinanović
- Nedim Buza
- Nedim Đedović
- Nihad Đedović
- Rasid Mahalbasić
- Sabahudin Bilalović
- Sabit Hadžić
- Sani Bečirovič
- Sead Šehović
- Suad Šehović
- Mersada Bećirspahić
- Razija Mujanović
- Tima Džebo

== Football (soccer) ==
- Abdulah Gegić
- Adem Ljajić
- Adis Jahović
- Admir Smajić
- Adnan Gušo
- Ahmed Mujdragić
- Ajdin Maksumić
- Aldin Gurdijeljac
- Alen Avdić
- Alen Halilović
- Alen Orman
- Alen Škoro
- Almedin Hota
- Almir Gegić
- Almir Gredić
- Almir Memić
- Almir Turković
- Amer Osmanagić
- Anel Ahmedhodžić
- Asim Ferhatović
- Baggio Husidić
- Bajro Župić
- Damir Džombić
- Darijo Srna
- Dennis Hadžikadunić
- Dino Djulbic
- Dželaludin Muharemović
- Džemaludin Mušović
- Edhem Šljivo
- Edin Džeko
- Edin Ferizović
- Ediz Bahtiyaroğlu
- Eldin Adilović
- Eldin Jakupović
- Elsad Zverotić
- Elvir Baljić
- Elvir Bolić
- Emir Bihorac
- Elvir Čolić
- Emir Hadžić
- Emir Janjoš
- Emir Lotinac
- Emir Obuća
- Emir Spahić
- Enver Alivodić
- Enver Hadžiabdić
- Enver Marić
- Ersin Mehmedović
- Ervin Zukanović
- Esad Karišik
- Esad Komić
- Fahrudin Kuduzović
- Fahrudin Mustafić
- Faruk Hadžibegić
- Faruk Hujdurović
- Fuad Muzurović
- Hajrudin Saračević
- Halil Kanacević
- Haris Medunjanin
- Haris Seferovic
- Haris Smajić
- Hasan Salihamidžić
- Husref Musemić
- Ibrahim Biogradlić
- Ibrahim Šehić
- Ifet Taljević
- Irfan Vušljanin
- Izet Hajrović
- Jasmin Burić
- Jasmin Handanovič
- Jasmin Kurtić
- Jasmin Trtovac
- Jasmin Šćuk
- Kenan Kodro
- Kenan Ragipović
- Mehmed Baždarević
- Mehmed Janjoš
- Meho Kodro
- Miralem Pjanić
- Mirsad Baljić
- Mirsad Bešlija
- Mirsad Fazlagić
- Mirsad Türkcan
- Mirza Golubica
- Mirza Kapetanović
- Mirza Varešanović
- Muamer Svraka
- Muhamed Bešić
- Muhamed Konjić
- Muhamed Mujić
- Munever Rizvić
- Mustafa Hasanagić
- Mustafa Sejmenović
- Nenad Bijedić
- Nermin Haskić
- Nijaz Ferhatović
- Ömer Çatkıç
- Rahim Beširović
- Rašid Avdić
- Refik Kozić
- Refik Šabanadžović
- Safet Sušić
- Saffet Sancaklı
- Said Husejinović
- Samir Bekrić
- Samir Handanovič
- Samir Muratović
- Sanel Kuljić
- Saudin Huseinović
- Sead Bajramović
- Sead Bučan
- Sead Hadžibulić
- Sead Halilagić
- Sead Kolašinac
- Sead Muratović
- Sead Zilić
- Sedin Alić
- Sedin Torlak
- Sejad Halilović
- Sejad Salihović
- Selver Hodžić
- Semir Hadžibulić
- Semir Kerla
- Senad Lulić
- Sergej Barbarez
- Sulejman Smajić
- Tarik Hodžić
- Vahid Halilhodžić
- Vahidin Musemić
- Vedad Ibišević
- Veldin Muharemović
- Zećira Mušović
- Zijad Arslanagić
- Zlatan Bajramović
- Zlatan Ibrahimović
- Zlatan Muslimović
- Zlatko Junuzović

== Handball ==
- Alen Muratović
- Enid Tahirović
- Ermin Velić
- Irfan Smajlagić
- Mirsad Terzić
- Mirza Džomba
- Muhammed Memić
- Muhamed Toromanović

== Martial arts ==
- Mirsad Bektić, mixed martial artist
- Adnan Ćatić (Felix Sturm), amateur and professional boxer
- Almedin Fetahović, boxing coach and amateur boxer
- Hamid Guska, boxing coach and amateur boxer
- Memnun Hadžić, boxer
- Marco Huck, boxer
- Amer Hrustanović, wrestler
- Nedžad Husić, taekwondo
- Enad Ličina, boxer
- Amel Mekić, judoka
- Arnela Odžaković, karateka
- Dževad Poturak, kickboxer

== Volleyball ==
- Adnan Herco
- Adis Lagumdžija

== Other ==
- Almir Velagić, weightlifter
- Amel Tuka, track and field athlete
- Ensar Hajder, Olympic swimmer
- Fikret Hodžić, bodybuilder
- Hamza Alić, track and field athlete
- Michi Halilović, German skeleton racer of Bosniak descent
- Nedžad Ćatić, Australian professional rugby league footballer
- Nedim Nišić, Olympic swimmer
- Nedžad Fazlija, sports shooter
- Dino Beganovic Racing Driver

== Tennis ==
- Amer Delić, tennis player
- Damir Džumhur, tennis player
- Ivan Ljubičić, tennis player (Croatian father, Bosniak mother)
- Mervana Jugić-Salkić, tennis player

== See also ==
- List of Bosnians
- List of Bosniaks
- Bosnian people category
