= List of Bosniak writers =

This is a list of Bosniak novelists, poets and other writers.

== A ==
The handbook, Bosnian Book of the Science of Conduct by Abdulvehab Ilhamija (1773–1821)

- Abdulah Sidran (1944–2024), writer and poett
- Alija Isaković (1932–1997), writer, essayist, publicist, playwright, and lexicographer
- Ayşe Kulin (born 1941), Turkish novelist and columnist with Bosniak ancestry

== B ==
- Bisera Alikadić (born 1939), poet

== D ==
- Dževad Karahasan (1953–2023), writer and philosopher

== E ==
- Emir Suljagić (born 1975), author

== F ==
- Faruk Šehić (born 1970), poet, novelist and short story writer
- Feđa Isović (born 1965), screenplay writer

== I ==
- Izet Sarajlić (1930–2002), historian, essayist, translator and poet

== J ==
- Jasmin Imamović (born 1956), writer and the current mayor of Tuzla

== K ==
- Karim Zaimović (1971–1995), writer, journalist and publicist

== M ==
- Midhat Ajanović (born 1959), writer
- Muhamed Filipović (1929–2020), academic, philosopher, writer, theorist, essayist and historian

== N ==
- Nasiha Kapidžić-Hadžić (1932–1995), children's author and poet
- Nedžad Ibrišimović (1940–2011), writer
- Nijaz Duraković (1949–2012), author and intellectual

== S ==
- Safet Plakalo (1950–2015), playwright and poet
- Semezdin Mehmedinović (born 1960), writer
- Semir Osmanagić (born 1960), writer
- Senad Hadžimusić (born 1957), poet and songwriter
- Šemso Tucaković (born 1946), writer and historian
- Šerbo Rastoder (born 1956), historian

== T ==
- Tarik Samarah (born 1965), author
- Téa Obreht (born 1985), naturalized American novelist with Bosniak ancestry, author of The Tiger's Wife (2011)

== V ==
- Vehid Gunić (1941–2017), writer and journalist

== Z ==
- Zlatko Topčić (born 1955), writer and screenwriter

== See also ==
- List of Bosniaks
- List of Bosniaks in music
