= Hasanbegović =

Hasanbegović is a surname. Notable people with the surname include:

- Azra Hasanbegović, Bosnian women's rights activist
- Jado Hasanbegović (born 1948), Yugoslav footballer
- Marijana Mišković-Hasanbegović (born 1982), Croatian judoka
- Melisa Hasanbegović (born 1995), Bosnian footballer
- Mirza Hasanbegovic (born 2001), Swedish-born Bosnian footballer
- Nedim Hasanbegović (born 1988), German footballer
- Nela Hasanbegović (born 1984), Bosnia and Herzegovina sculptor
- Zlatko Hasanbegović (born 1973), Croatian politician and historian
