= Memorijal Hakija Turajlić =

Boxing tournament

Memorijal Hakija Turajlić is a boxing tournament named in honor of Hakija Turajlić, a former Bosnian politician, economist and businessman who was assassinated in 1993 during the Bosnian War. The first Memorijal Hakija Turajlić was held in 1994, during the Siege of Sarajevo, and since then more than 500 boxers from 30 countries have participated in the tournament.

From 1998. until 2008. it was one of strongest amateur boxing tournaments in Bosnia and Herzegovina.

== Notable boxers ==
A large number of high quality amateur boxers have competed at the Memorijal Hakija Turajlić:

- (Belarus) Magomed Aripgadjiev
- (Belarus) Magomed Nurutdinov
- (Bosnia and Herzegovina) Damir Beljo
- (Bosnia and Herzegovina) Džemal Bošnjak
- (Bosnia and Herzegovina) Nermin Bašović
- (Bosnia and Herzegovina) Almedin Fetahović
- (Bosnia and Herzegovina) Džemal Fetahović
- (Bosnia and Herzegovina) Adem Fetahović
- (Bosnia and Herzegovina) Memnun Hadžić
- (Bosnia and Herzegovina) Darko Kučuk
- (Bosnia and Herzegovina) Esmir Kukić
- (Bosnia and Herzegovina) Mirsad Majstorić
- (Bosnia and Herzegovina) Emil Markić
- (Bosnia and Herzegovina) Izet Mrkulić
- (Bosnia and Herzegovina) Enes Peštek
- (Bosnia and Herzegovina) Halid Ranica
- (Bosnia and Herzegovina) Adnan Redžović
- (Bosnia and Herzegovina) Jasmin Sejdinović
- (Bosnia and Herzegovina) Hamid Šemić
- (Bosnia and Herzegovina) Hajrudin Šerifović
- (Bosnia and Herzegovina) Muharem Šuvalić
- (Bosnia and Herzegovina) Emir Telalović
- (Bosnia and Herzegovina) Velibor Vidić
- (Bosnia and Herzegovina) Stevo Zolak
- (Bosnia and Herzegovina) Ismet Žerić
- (Bulgaria) Detelin Dalakliev
- (Bulgaria) Spas Genov
- (Bulgaria) Sergey Rozhnov
- (Bulgaria) Salim Salimov
- (Croatia) Alen Babić
- (Croatia) Jetiš Bajrami
- (Croatia) Stjepan Božić
- (Croatia) Marko Čalić
- (Croatia) Stipe Drews
- (Croatia) Filip Palić
- (Croatia) Mirko Filipović
- (Croatia) Marijo Šivolija
- (Croatia) Marko Tomasović
- (Cyprus) Costas Philippou
- (Egypt) Ramadan Yasser
- (Germany) Stefan Härtel
- (Germany) Artur Schmidt
- (Hungary) Csaba Kurtucz
- (Republic of Ireland) Dean Byrne
- (Republic of Ireland) Darren O'Neill
- (North Macedonia) Veli Mumin
- (Montenegro) Alen Beganović
- (Montenegro) Boško Drašković
- (Montenegro) Bojan Pešić
- (Philippines) Liben Salazar
- (Romania) Ionut Gheorghe
- (Romania) Ionut Ion
- (Russia) Valeri Chechenev
- (Serbia) Zoran Mitrović
- (Serbia) Milan Piperski
- (Serbia) Nikola Sjekloca
- (Serbia) Milan Vasiljević
- (Slovenia) Dejan Zavec
- (Spain) José Kelvin de la Nieve Linares
- (Spain) Eric Pambani
- (Switzerland) Herry Saliku Biembe
- (Switzerland) David Roethlisberger
- (Switzerland) Stephane Roethlisberger
- (Switzerland) Arnold Gjergjaj
