= Secondary School of Applied Arts Sarajevo =

Location
- Gimnazijska 11; Sarajevo; Bosnia and Herzegovina
- Coordinates: 43°51′28″N 18°25′25″E

Information
- Type: Public, co-educational
- Founded: 1892
- Principal: Elma Alić-Šobot
- Teaching staff: 36
- Enrollment: 450
- Average class size: 15
- Language: Bosnian and English
- Colours: Blue and white
- Website: https://artschoolsa.edu.ba

The Secondary School of Applied Arts Sarajevo (Bosnian: Srednja škola primijenjenih umjetnosti Sarajevo; Serbo-Croatian Cyrillic: Средња школа примијењених умјетности Сарајево) is a public secondary institution in Sarajevo, Bosnia and Herzegovina, specializing in applied and visual arts education. Established in 1892 during Austro-Hungarian rule, the school has played a pivotal role in preserving traditional crafts and fostering artistic development in the region.

== History ==
Founded in 1892 as the School of Artistic Crafts, the institution aimed to preserve and enhance traditional artistic trades that had already achieved a high level of technical and aesthetic sophistication in the area. The current school building was constructed in 1893 and still houses artifacts, such as copper items crafted in Austria, reflecting the school’s historical ties with Austrian craftsmanship.

After World War II, in 1945, the State School for Artistic Crafts and the State School for Fine Arts were established. These institutions merged in 1950 to form the School of Applied Arts, which has since been located in the former Women’s Teacher Training School building.

During the Bosnian War (1992–1995), the school faced significant challenges, including damage to its infrastructure and displacement of staff and students. Despite these obstacles, a dedicated group of teachers and artists continued to provide education under perilous conditions. In 1993, the building was struck by a 52 kg shell, causing substantial damage but, fortunately, no casualties. Post-war reconstruction efforts, supported by organizations such as KulturKontakt Austria and HOPE 87, led to the renovation of the school building starting in 1997.

== Educational program ==
The school offers a curriculum that emphasizes foundational visual arts disciplines while providing training in various techniques and skills, including graphic design, painting, sculpture, metalwork, and fashion design. Since 1994, the school has operated under a new curriculum that balances general education with specialized artistic instruction. The educational process is organized into six departments, facilitating both general and specialized training.

== Notable alumni ==
The school has produced numerous prominent figures in the arts and beyond. Notable alumni include:

- Safet Zec: Renowned painter and graphic designer known for works such as My Sister’s Room and the Srebrenica series.
- Bojan Hadzihalilovic: Graphic designer and creative director, co-founder of the design group TRIO Sarajevo, recognized for his contributions to visual identity during the Sarajevo Winter Olympics.
- Nela Hasanbegović: Sculptor noted for works like Between Light and Darkness and Poles.
- Mersad Berber
- Roman Petrović
- Nedžad Ibrišimović
- Endi E. Poskovic - American visual artist, printmaker, and educator.
- Vojo Dimitrijević
- Nedžad Ibrišimović: Acclaimed writer.
- Jadranka Stojaković: Celebrated singer-songwriter.
- Damir Nikšić: Conceptual artist and political figure.
- Šejla Kamerić – A contemporary visual artist known for her conceptual and politically engaged works. She graduated from the school during the Siege of Sarajevo and later studied graphic design at the Academy of Fine Arts in Sarajevo.
