= Sanela =

Sanela is a Bosnian first name shared by the following women:

- Sanela Diana Jenkins (born 1973), Bosnian entrepreneur and philanthropist
- Sanela Knezović (born 1979), Bosnian-born Croatian handball player
- Sanela Redžić, Bosnian disabled athlete
- Sanela Sijerčić, Bosnian folk singer
