= San Antonio Thunder =

Defunct American soccer club (1975–1976)

- Founded: 1975
- Dissolved: 1976; 50 years ago
- Stadium: North East Stadium (1975); Alamo Stadium (1976); San Antonio, Texas
- Owner: Herman Warden "Ward" Lay, Jr.
- League: NASL
Home colors	Away colors

The San Antonio Thunder were an American soccer team based in San Antonio, Texas. Founded in 1975 as a member of the North American Soccer League, the team played two seasons in San Antonio before the franchise rights were moved to Hawaii. The team was owned by Herman Warden "Ward" Lay Jr., son of the founder of the Frito-Lay potato chip empire.

== History ==
=== Founding and first season ===
On June 25, 1974, San Antonio, Texas was announced as the location of the North American Soccer League's 17th franchise for the following season, with Herman Warden "Ward" Lay Jr. paying a reported fee of $250,000 to join the league. In late September, the team name of Thunder was chosen from 1,500 suggested and the team hired former Rochester Lancers and Los Angeles Aztecs head coach Alex Perolli to manage the team. Originally slated to play at Alamo Stadium, the team and San Antonio Independent School District (SAISD) could not come to a rental agreement and the team signed a lease to play their home games at North East Stadium. In Late January 1975 the Thunder traded the contract rights to Sergio Velazquez and their 1976 and 1977 first round draft picks to the Los Angeles Aztecs in return for seven players including Luis Marotte and Renato Costa. The next week the team traded Costa to the Dallas Tornado for Bob Ridley, before acquiring two more Aztec players by trade a few weeks later, and cutting Ridley by the end of the month. By mid March it was reported that the team had sold 775 season tickets, but would end up being fourth in the league in season ticket sales. Before the season began, the team added Jado Hasanbegović, Chris Carenza, Dan Counce, and Mark Stahl to the roster.

The Thunder opened their season at home defeating the Dallas Tornado 2–1 in front of 5,142 fans. It was the first game in NASL history to be decided by a sudden death goal. In mid May, it was reported that defender Dan Califano quit the team due to a personality conflict with coach Perolli and the team had made a total of eight roster changes, including releasing all of the team's goalkeepers, after just four matches. On May 22, 1975, team owner Ward Lay announced he was assuming full control of the team and would be responsible for all player decisions. A few weeks later, with the team having lost eight straight games, on June 9 Perolli was replaced as head coach by California State University, Chico Wildcats coach Don Batie . After winning four games in six, including a three games in a row, the team won only one more game the rest of the season, ending the season with a six-game losing streak. The Thunder ended the 1975 North American Soccer League season with 6 wins and 16 losses and in last place in the Central Division. For the team's eleven home games they averaged 4,411 fans, about 2,000 less than the Thunder had expected.

=== Bicentennial season ===
Shortly after the conclusion of the season, it was announced that Don Batie would return to coach the team for the 1976 season having signed a one-year contract. On September 10, the team posted its performance bond with the league confirming it would participate in the 1976 season with team owner Ward Lay stating they team had lost money the previous season, but was on a solid financial footing. On December 10, 1975, Jim Smith, General Manager of the Houston Aeros replaced Mike Boyle as Thunder GM. In late January 1976, Scottish forward Jim Forrest was signed as a player-coach to assist Batie, the first of several Scottish players who would join the team before the season including Aberdeen F.C. goalkeeper Bobby Clark, Billy Semple, and captain of the 1966 FIFA World Cup winning England national team Bobby Moore. In February 1976 it was announced that the team would play its home matches at Alamo Stadium

Two weeks before the season, the Thunders hosted the New York Cosmos led by Pelé who had signed with the New York team the previous year for $2.8 million for two years, with the San Antonio team reportedly paying $25,000 for the visit. In what was considered an upset, the Thunder defeated the Cosmos 1–0, with rookie goalie Peter Mannos saving a shot made by Pelé. On July 13, 1976, GM Jim Smith stated that unless the SAISD gave the club a say in marketing and concessions at Alamo Stadium that it needed financially that the team would abandon the stadium and probably leave San Antonio. The Thunder finished the season with a record of 12 wins and 12 losses, finishing fourth in the Pacific Conference Southern Division and missing out on qualifying for the playoffs by one point. Attendance for the season averaged 5,064

=== Demise and relocation ===
Less than a week after the season had concluded, Don Batie announced his resignation as head coach of the Thunder to return to coaching the California State University Chico Wildcats. It was reported the Thunder has lost $600,000 during its two seasons of operations and was considering relocation with Atlanta mentioned as a possible destination for the franchise. During a press conference on September 16, 1976, owner Ward Lay announced that GM Jim Smith had resigned and that due to lack of local support were considering a move to Hawaii. The following week it was reported that Lay was looking for an investment of $500,000 for a 50% share of the team. In late October, team owner Ward Lay said that he had been approached by governor of Hawaii and the Mayor of Honolulu about moving the team to the island state. League sources also stated that, pending the Thunder relocating the owners of the Philadelphia Atoms were interested in relocating their franchise to Texas city. On November 18, 1976, the move to Hawaii was made official, with the club renamed Team Hawaii, with the team public relations director and Ward Lay appearing at an event in Honolulu and posting a sign in its San Antonio office window stating "Mahola, San Antonio. Aloha, Hawaii" (English "Thank you, San Antonio. Hello Hawaii).

== Year-by-year ==
Year	League	W	L	Pts	Reg. season	Playoffs	Attendance
1975	NASL	6	16	59	5th, Central Division	did not qualify	4,412
1976	NASL	12	12	107	4th, Pacific Conference, Southern Division	did not qualify	4,794

== Players ==
- (England) Bob McNab (1976)
- (England) Bobby Moore (1976)
- (Scotland) Tommy Callaghan (1976)
- (Scotland) Bobby Clark (1976)
- (Scotland) Derek Currie (1976)
- (Scotland) Jim Forrest (1975,1976)
- (Scotland) Jim Henry (1976)
- (Scotland) Harry Hood (1976)
- (Scotland) Neil Martin (1976)
- (Scotland) Billy Semple (1976)
- (Scotland) Eddie Thomson (1976)

== See also ==
- San Antonio Scorpions of the North American Soccer League
- San Antonio FC of the United Soccer League
