= Billy Semple =

Scottish footballer

Personal information
- Full name: William McAdam Semple
- Date of birth: 2 November 1946 (age 79)
- Place of birth: Bellshill, Scotland
- Position: Winger

Youth career
- Edinburgh Athletic

Senior career*
Years	Team	Apps	(Gls)
1967–1971	Rangers	8	(2)
1972	Durban United		
1972–1974	Dundee	12	(1)
1974–1975	Hong Kong Rangers	45	(21)
1976	San Antonio Thunder	21	(0)
1976–1977	Albion Rovers	28	(13)
1977–1981	Seiko	127	(32)
1981–1982	Bulova	24	(8)
1982–1983	South China	16	(3)
- * Club domestic league appearances and goals

William McAdam Semple (born 2 November 1946) is a Scottish former professional footballer.

In his playing career he played for Rangers, Durban United, Dundee, Hong Kong Rangers, San Antonio Thunder, Seiko, Bulova and South China. He was also selected to represent Scotland at schoolboy international level.
