= Derek Currie =

Scottish-born Hong Kong footballer

Personal information
- Date of birth: 8 February 1949 (age 77)
- Place of birth: Glasgow, Scotland
- Position: Winger

Youth career
- –1966: Dumbarton

Senior career*
Years	Team	Apps	(Gls)
1966–1967	Third Lanark		
1967–1970	Motherwell		
1970–1972	Rangers (HKG)		
1972–1980	Seiko		
1976	→ San Antonio Thunder (loan)		
1980	Bulova		
1980–1982	Eastern		

International career
1979	Hong Kong	6	(1)
- * Club domestic league appearances and goals

Derek Currie is a former professional footballer who was one of the first of three professionals to play in Asia when Hong Kong introduced professional football in 1970. Born in Scotland, he played for the Hong Kong national football team.

== Club career ==
Currie along with fellow Scotsmen, Walter Gerrard and Jackie Trainer first arrived in Hong Kong in September 1970 where they joined Hong Kong Rangers.

Currie was the first overseas professional to score in an international match for the Hong Kong national team. During a three-month spell in San Antonio for the San Antonio Thunder in the NASL, Currie scored the official first goal in the Bicentennial League against St. Louis All-Stars, He scored both goals in their 2–1 win at the Alamo Stadium. Currie retired in 1982, playing his final farewell game against German side, VfB Stuttgart in Hong Kong.

== International career ==
In 1978, he became the first professional to play for the Hong Kong national football team and was followed by fellow professional, David Anderson and both competed for Hong Kong in the Asian Cup qualifying in Bangkok in 1979.

By scoring against Sri Lanka, Currie was the first overseas professional to score in an international match for Hong Kong.
