= Ahmet Sejdić =

Bosniak soldier

- Born: 2 January 1960 (age 66); Drokan, Višegrad, SR Bosnia and Herzegovina, Yugoslavia
- Military career
- Allegiance: Republic of Bosnia and Herzegovina
- Service years: 1992–95
- Unit: 1st Višegrad Brigade
- Commands: Commander in Višegrad
- Conflicts: Bosnian War

Ahmet Sejdić (born 2 January 1960) is the former commander of the 1st Višegrad Brigade during the Bosnian War from 1992 to 1995. After the brigade was forced to leave the Višegrad region, it moved to Goražde because of the fall of Rogatica and lack of supplies, he commanded the 808th Muslim Brigade.
