= Asim Peco =

Bosnian linguist

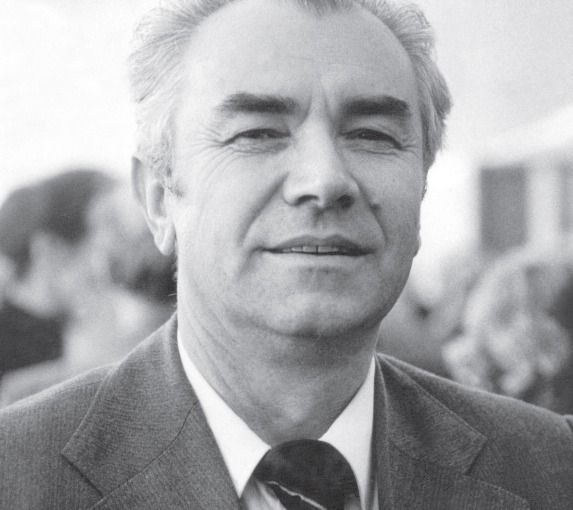
- Born: 24 May 1927; Ortiješ, near Mostar, Kingdom of Yugoslavia
- Died: 7 December 2011 (aged 84); Belgrade, Serbia
- Education: University of Belgrade
- Known for: Serbo-Croatian language, and its dialects
- Awards: 1986, Veselin Masleša; 1990, Vuk award
- Scientific career
- Fields: Linguistics
- Workplaces: University of Belgrade

Asim Peco (Serbian Cyrillic: Асим Пецо, pronounced [ǎːsim pěːtso]; 24 May 1927 – 7 December 2011) was a Bosnian linguist, academician, professor, author and editor.

Peco's work is credited for the development of Bosnian and Herzegovinian linguistics. His areas of specialization include the dialectology of Bosnia and Herzegovina and Serbia, namely the Shtokavian and Torlakian dialects. He wrote books on the speeches of eastern and central Herzegovina, speeches of western Herzegovina, Ikavian-Štokavian dialects of Bosnia and Turkish loanwords into them.

His work is cited or referenced by many. For example, his research on eastern Bosnian dialect was discussed at the United Nations' International Criminal Tribunal for the Former Yugoslavia (ICTY).

== Early life and education ==
Peco was born in the village of Ortiješ, near Mostar, Bosnia and Herzegovina to Jusuf and Hajrija Peco. His brother, Džemal Peco, was a teacher.

After graduating from the Viša pedagoška škola high school in Sarajevo, Peco went to Belgrade where he enrolled in the University of Belgrade Faculty of Philology, a department within the Faculty of Philosophy at the time. His 1958 PhD dissertation was entitled Govor istočne Hercegovine ("The dialect of eastern Herzegovina"). Already in high school Peco showed interest in scholarly research.

== Career ==
After completing his education at the University of Belgrade, Peco became a regular professor of Philology at the university, where he was elected several times as a head of the department for Serbo-Croatian and South Slavic languages. He was a mentor for numerous M.A. and Ph.D. theses, and a participant to numerous domestic and international conferences.

He was a Member and contributor of the Academy of Sciences and Arts of Bosnia and Herzegovina since 1978, and a Corresponding (Foreign) Member of the Montenegrin Academy of Sciences and Arts since 2003. Peco edited journal Bosanskohercegovački dijalektološki zbornik ("Bosnian-Herzegovinian dialectological miscellany") for many years, and served a member of editing boards of many other journals.

In 1963, at the Fifth International Congress of Slavists held in Sofia, Bulgaria, Peco complained about some of the participants, stating:

"...individual members of the delegation of the host country" in the Linguistic section "attempted to deny the right to independence of the Macedonian language, a language which possesses both its own literature, and its own grammar... True, such opinions are not new. They are a reflection of old, non-Marxist theories, long ago trampled into oblivion by time. Fortunately, such concepts were not also the opinion of the [Bulgarian] delegation as a whole. Besides, this type of formulation was not based on fact, which would be difficult to deny. On the contrary, the baselessness of such formulations was easy to prove even without referring to great authorities, and without referring to the basic principles of Marxist science."

He was also a presenter at the 1985 Yugoslav Onomastics Conference, a contributor to the Tenth International Committee for Phonetics and Phonology of Slavonic Languages Conference in 1987, and editor of the magazine Bosanskohercegovački Dijalektološki Anthology.

Professor Peco retired from the University of Belgrade in 1992, and made his home in Belgrade until his death in 2011.

== Awards and honours ==
Amongst his awards, Peco received the "Veselin Masleša Award" in 1986 in Sarajevo, "14 februar award" in Mostar in 1986, and the "Vuk Award" in 1990 in Belgrade.

== Selected works ==
Peco is the first academic in Bosnia and Herzegovina that has had published collected works after the Yugoslav wars. The publisher is the Bosnian Philological Society, and co-publishers are the Academy of Sciences and Arts of Bosnia and Herzegovina and "Bemust".

- (1960). Les consonnes longues en serbocroate. Strasbourg. (in French)
- (1961). Akcenat sela Ortiješa. Sarajevo: Naučno društvo NR Bosne i Hercegovine. (in Serbo-Croatian)
- — & Nikolić, B. (1964). Rasprave i građa. Srpski dijalektološki zbornik, knj. 14. Beograd: Institut za srpskohrvatski jezik. (in Serbo-Croatian)
- — & Pešikan, M. (1967). Informator o savremenom književnom jeziku sa rečnikom. Beograd: "Mlado pokolenje,". (in Serbo-Croatian)
- (1967). "Uticaj turskog jezika na fonetiku štokavskih govora". Naš jezik, 16, 3. (in Serbo-Croatian)
- (1970). Zvončići zvone: akcenatska čitanka za V, VI, VII, i VIII razred osnovne škole. Beograd: Naučna knjiga. (in Serbo-Croatian)
- (1971). Osnovi akcentologije srpskohrvatskog jezika. Univerzitetski udžbenici. Beograd: Naučna knj. (in Serbo-Croatian)
- — & Stanojčić, Z. (1972). Srpskohrvatski jezik. Beograd. (in Serbo-Croatian)
- (1978). Pregled srpskohrvatskih dijalekata. Univerzitetski udžbenici. Beograd: Naučna knjiga. (in Serbo-Croatian)
- (1980). Osnovi akcentologije srpskohvatskog jezika. Beograd: Naučna knjiga. (in Serbo-Croatian)
- (1985). Stazama našeg jezika. Beograd: Zavod za udžbenike i nastavna sredstva. (in Serbo-Croatian)
- — & Mandić, P. (1986). Ikavskoštakavski govori zapadne Hercegovine. Sarajevo: Akademija nauka i umjetnosti Bosne i Hercegovine. (in Serbo-Croatian)
- (1987). Iz jezičke teorije i prakse. Beograd: Naučna knj. (in Serbo-Croatian)
- — & Karadžić, V. S. (1987). Turcizmi u Vukovim rječnicima. Beograd: Vuk Karadžić. ISBN 86-307-0058-0 (in Serbo-Croatian)
- (1989). Akcenatska čitanka. Beograd: Naučna knj. ISBN 86-23-70059-7 (in Serbo-Croatian)
- — & Gošić, N., & Kovačević-Kojić, D. (1989). Osamsto godina povelje bosanskog bana Kulina, 1189-1989. Sarajevo: Akademija nauka i umjetnosti Bosne i Hercegovine. ISBN 86-7123-025-2 (in Serbo-Croatian)
- (1990). Književni jezik i narodni govori. Mostar: Prva književna komuna. ISBN 978-86-375-0075-9 (in Serbo-Croatian)
- — & Čović, B. (1990). Mikrotoponimija Podveležja. Sarajevo: Akademija nauka i umjetnosti Bosne i Hercegovine. ISBN 86-7123-029-5 (in Serbo-Croatian)
- (1990). Vukovim jezičkim stazama. Valjevo: GIRO "Milić Rakić". ISBN 86-7173-033-6 (in Serbo-Croatian)
- (1991). Akcenti i dužine u srpskohrvatskom jeziku. Beograd: Naučna knj. ISBN 86-23-70124-0 (in Serbo-Croatian)
- (1995). Pisci i njihov jezik. Beograd: Prosveta. (in Serbo-Croatian)
- (1996). Iz života naših reči. Beograd: Prosveta. ISBN 86-07-00978-8 (in Serbo-Croatian)
- (2000). Jezičkim stazama Desanke Maksimović. Beograd: Prosveta. ISBN 86-07-01230-4 (in Serbo-Croatian)
- (2001). Sa naših jezičkih izvorišta: od Kulina bana do naših dana. Beograd: Zavod za udžbenike i nastavna sredstva. ISBN 86-17-08568-1 (in Serbo-Croatian)
