= Jado Hasanbegović =

Yugoslav footballer

Nedžad Jado Hasanbegović
Personal information
- Full name: Nedžad Hasanbegović
- Date of birth: 8 January 1948
- Place of birth: Sarajevo, SFR Yugoslavia
- Date of death: 10 November 2023 (aged 75)
- Place of death: Mostar, Bosnia
- Position: Striker

Senior career*
Years	Team	Apps	(Gls)
1966-1968	FK Iskra Sarajevo	28	(15)
1968-1970	FK Sarajevo	12	(1)
1970	FK Sloga Doboj		
- FK Jedinstvo Brčko
- FK FAP
1975	San Antonio Thunder	11	(0)
1977	Connecticut Bicentennials	11	(4)
1978	Chicago Sting	24	(4)
1979–1980	Memphis Rogues	28	(3)
1979–1980	Memphis Rogues (indoor)	10	(7)
Total		124	(34)
- * Club domestic league appearances and goals

Nedžad "Jado" Hasanbegović (8 January 1948 – 10 November 2023) was a Yugoslav footballer who played in the North American Soccer League.

== Career ==
In 1975, Hasanbegović signed with the San Antonio Thunder. In 1977, he played for the Connecticut Bicentennials and in 1978, he moved to the Chicago Sting. In 1979, the Sting traded him to the Memphis Rogues where he played two seasons.

Hasanbegović died on 10 November 2023 in Mostar, Bosnia and Herzegovina after a short illness.
