= Hamid Guska =

Bosnian boxer and coach

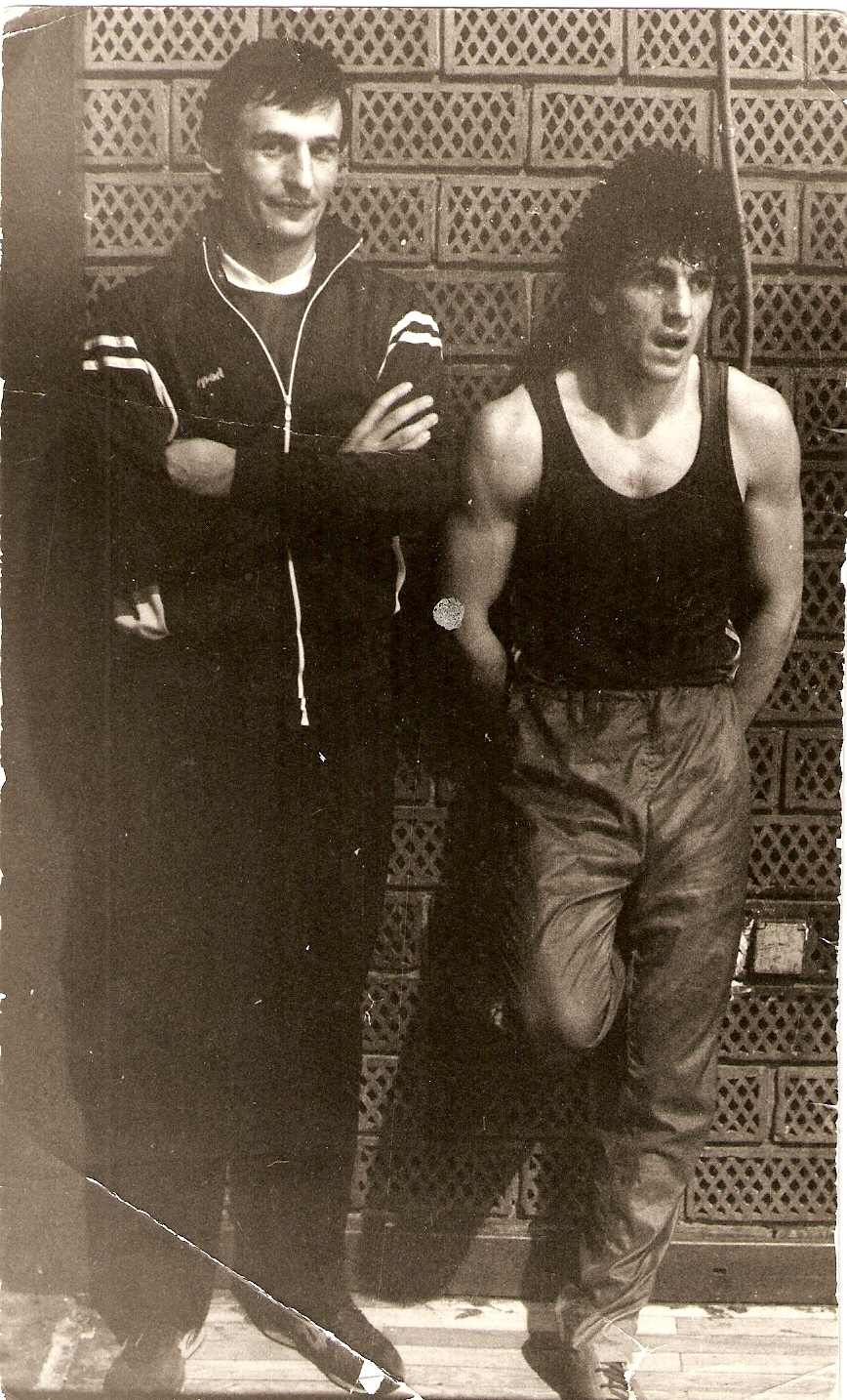
Guska (left) with Almedin Fetahović in 1989

Hamid Guska (born 15 February 1953 in Glavatičevo) is a Bosnian boxing trainer and a former boxer.

== Boxing career ==
He started his amateur boxing career in 1974 in BK Partizan Sarajevo. His boxing career ended 1980 due to an arm injury. One year later he was named as trainer of BK Željezničar. Under his guidance the club achieved its first promotion in the Yugoslav Boxing League. Željezničar became one of the strongest Yugoslav clubs in the late 1980s, finishing 3rd on two occasions (seasons 1986/87, 1988/89).

== Head coach of BK Željezničar ==
Several boxers of BK Željezničar have been Yugoslavian Champions and medal winners at major international boxing tournaments. Hamid Guska trained a large number of notable boxers: Fikret Kadić, Almedin Fetahović, Stephen Mwema, David Ouma, Zijad Hodžić, Vibor Ćorković, Predrag Bartula, Zaim Numanović, Kazimir Radoš, Rifat Kadić, Ibrahim Jakupović, Afrim Majanci, Ramiz Aljić, Mustafa Mrkulić, Izet Mrkulić, Mensur Peljto, Draženko Đokić, Muhamed Jeleč, Mergim Šalja, Said Čolpa and Edin Bajrić. However, BK Željezničar ceased to exist due to the Bosnian War.

== Bosnia and Herzegovina ==
In 1993, Guska was named as coach of newly founded Bosnia and Herzegovina boxing national team. At the Mediterranean Games in 1993, in France, Almedin Fetahović, a member of BK Željezničar, won the gold medal in light middleweight. It was the first gold medal for independent Bosnia and Herzegovina won on a major multi sport event.

Guska also guided the Bosnian national team on its first participation at the 1993 European Amateur Boxing Championships in Bursa. Edin Bajrić was stopped in Preliminaries losing to Danny Williams from United Kingdom in heavyweight. In 2001, he was named as the Head coach of Bosnian youth national team. On the 2001 European youth championships Aldin Avdić won bronze medal in superheavyweight. It was the first medal for Bosnia and Herzegovina on European Amateur Boxing Championships.

In 2002, Guska was appointed as the Head coach of all Bosnian boxing national teams (schoolboys, cadets, juniors and seniors).

During this period his boxers won four bronze medals at major boxing competitions:

- Jasmin Hasić (2007: European Junior Boxing Championships in Sombor)
- Nadir Čolpa (2008: European Schoolboys Championships in Novi Sad)
- Memnun Hadžić (2008: European Amateur Boxing Championships in Liverpool)
- Velibor Vidić (2009: Mediterranean Games in Pescara)

In August 2009 he was succeeded by Anton Josipović as Head coach of Bosnia and Herzegovina. Hamid Guska continued his work as director in an elementary school in Hrasnica, Ilidža. He is a boxing pundit and co-commentator for leading Bosnian TV stations.

== Success at Pan Arab Games ==
Guska was named as trainer of United Arab Emirates boxing team for the 2004 Pan Arab Games in Algeria. Ali Khalfan Ali won bronze medal in featherweight and became the first Emirati boxer ever to win a medal at a major international multi-sport event.
