= Sanjin Halimović =

Bosnian politician

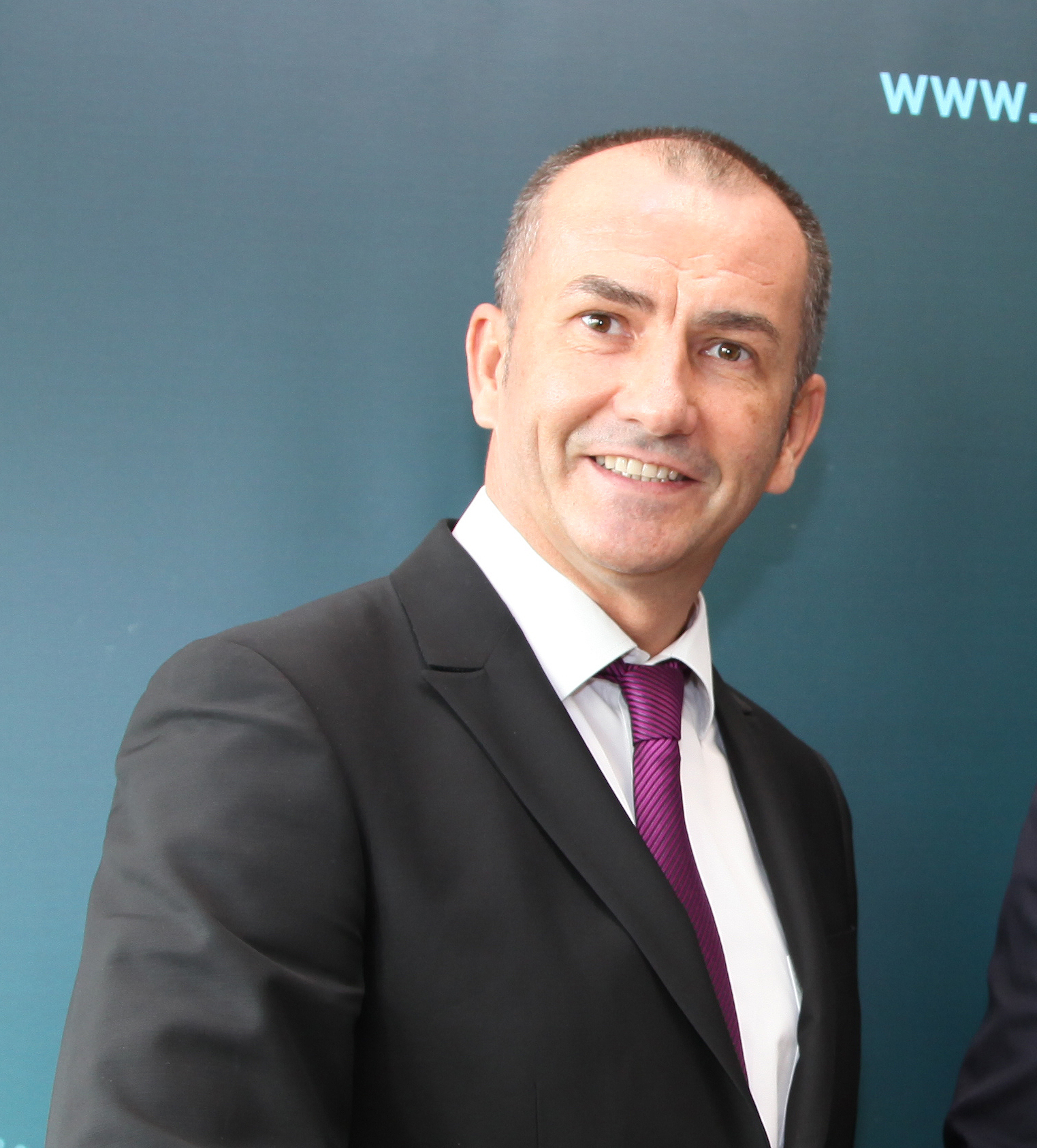

Minister of Development, Entrepreneurship and Crafts
- In office 17 March 2011 – 16 March 2015
- Prime Minister: Nermin Nikšić
- Preceded by: Velimir Kunić
- Succeeded by: Amir Zukić

Mayor of Sanski Most
- In office 2004–2011
- Succeeded by: Mustafa Avdagić

Personal details
- Born: 31 May 1969 (age 57) Sanski Most, SR Bosnia and Herzegovina, Socialist Federal Republic of Yugoslavia
- Party: SDA
- Spouse: Samila
- Children: 4
- Education: University of Sarajevo

Sanjin Halimović (born 31 May 1969) is a Bosnian politician. He served as the mayor of his hometown Sanski Most for seven years beginning in 2004. Halimović is the former Vice President of the Party of Democratic Action and was the Minister of Development, Entrepreneurship and Crafts in Bosnia and Herzegovina from 2011 until 2015.

== Biography ==
Sanjin Halimović was born in the Bosanska Krajina city of Sanski Most to Bosnian Muslim parents, while Bosnia and Herzegovina was a part of Communist Yugoslavia at the time. He attended the Veterinary Faculty of the University of Sarajevo, graduating in 1996 and earning his Master's degree in 2000. During postgraduate studies, Halimović resided in the Netherlands and Hanover, Germany.

He defended a Doctoral thesis at the Veterinary Faculty in Sarajevo in 2007 and became an assistant professor at the University of Bihać. Halimović currently serves as a consultant for the Veterinary Department of the Una-Sana Canton, and a lecturer at the Bio-technical Faculty in Bihać.

In addition to his native Bosnian, he speaks German, Italian and English.

== Political career ==
=== Controversies ===
Between 2004 and 2010, Halimović served as the mayor of Sanski Most, his hometown. During his tenure, he toured the world, often travelling up to 150 days annually, instead of governing. Also during his time as mayor, he issued all the necessary paperwork and approvals for the construction of luxury cottages in the village of Čaplje in Sanski Most, which he claimed showed his "initiative to craft".

Controversy arose when it was reported that Halimović's wife Samila was illegally hired as a personal adviser to the President of the Federation of Bosnia and Herzegovina Živko Budimir on 11 March 2013, only due to the fact that her husband was a friend of Budimir's.
