= 1st Višegrad Brigade =

Bosnian brigade during Yugoslav Wars

The 1st Višegrad Brigade (Bosnian: Prva višegradska brigada) was a brigade of the Army of the Republic of Bosnia and Herzegovina during the Bosnian War. Its commander was Ahmet Sejdić. The brigade was established on 9 June 1992, made up of refugees and survivors of the 1992 massacres from Višegrad, mostly ethnic Bosniaks.

== History ==
Most of the members of the unit had no military training, but they were praised for their professionalism and bravery by Bosnian leaders at the time. 1,975 people were part of the brigade at some point, and 234 of them were killed in action.

It successfully defended pockets of the Višegrad area from mid-1992 until May 1993. After the fall of positions in the Rogatica area, faced with the possibility of being cut off from Goražde and dwindling supplies, the decision was made to safely pull out towards Goražde. It was done with the aim to one day liberate Višegrad, which before the genocide had a large Bosniak population. Unfortunately for the members of the brigade, that day never occurred, and today Višegrad is a primarily Serb town in Republika Srpska.
