= Endi E. Poskovic =

American visual artist and printmaker

Endi Poskovic
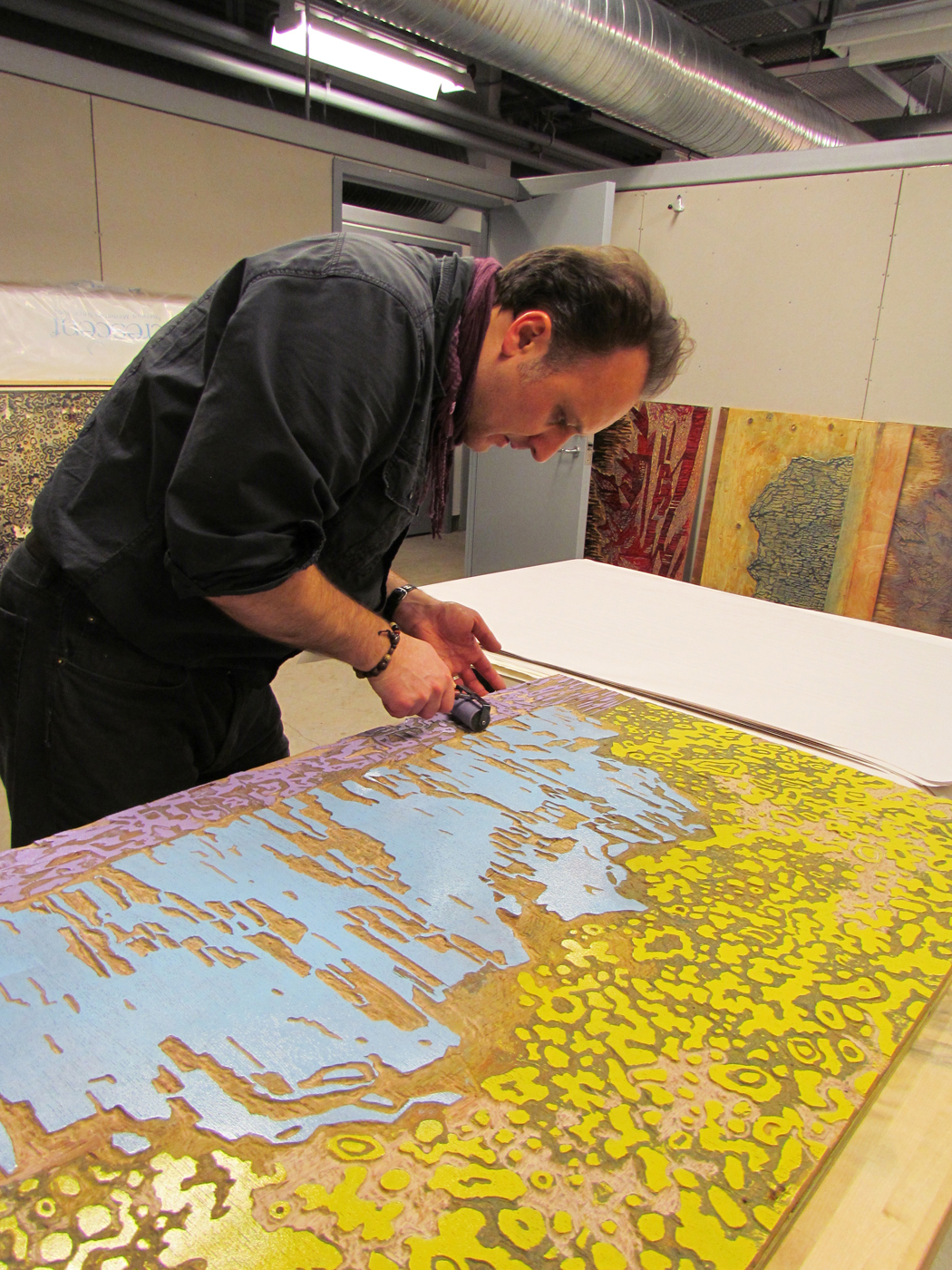
- Poskovic inking a wood-relief block in 2012
- Born: Elvedin Endi Pošković; January 29, 1969 (age 57); Sarajevo, SR Bosnia and Herzegovina, SFR Yugoslavia
- Education: University at Buffalo; University of Sarajevo
- Employer: University of Michigan
- Awards: Guggenheim Fellowship; Fulbright U.S. Scholar Grant; Pollock-Krasner Grant; Rockefeller Fellowship
- Website: endiposkovic.com

Endi Poskovic (born as Elvedin Pošković on January 29, 1969) is an American visual artist, printmaker and educator.

His early graphic work merges visual representation with text, often shifting the reading of the imagery through continuous representation and re-contextualization. Poskovic's woodcut prints invoke influences as disparate as early cinema, classic Japanese woodblock prints, devotional pictures, and Eastern European Propaganda poster. The amalgam of diverse scenarios and visual narratives in Poskovic's work imply accounts from personal and social histories and reference themes of cultural and environmental shifts, migration and alienation that are at once magnificent and tragic.

== Biography ==
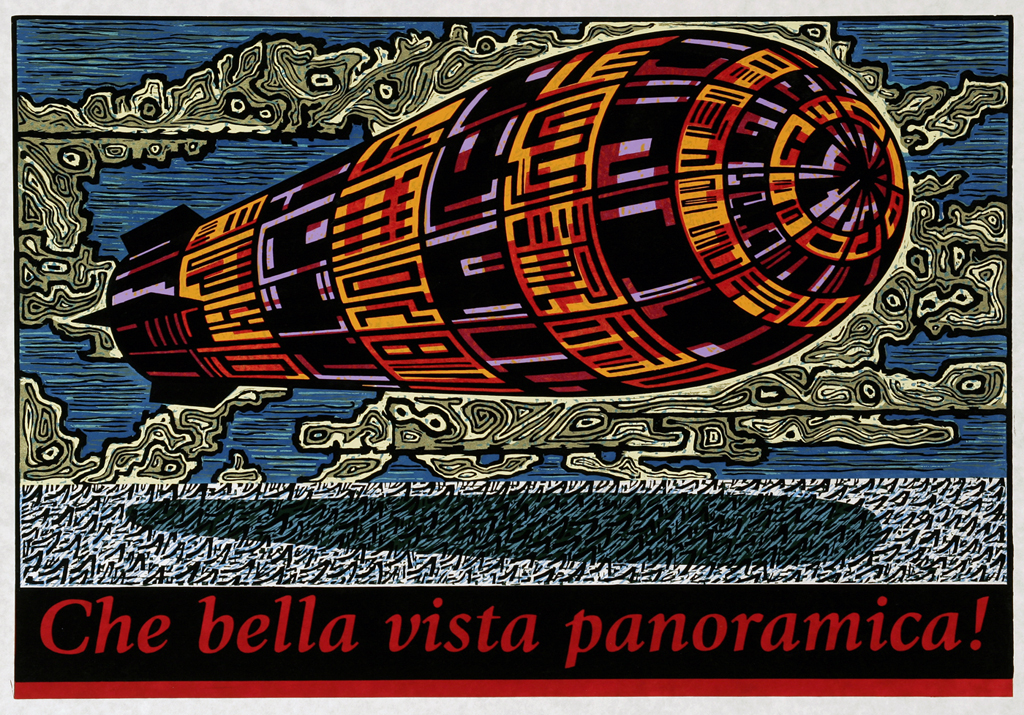
Endi Poskovic Sunny Day over the Bay in Orange and Deep Blue with Red

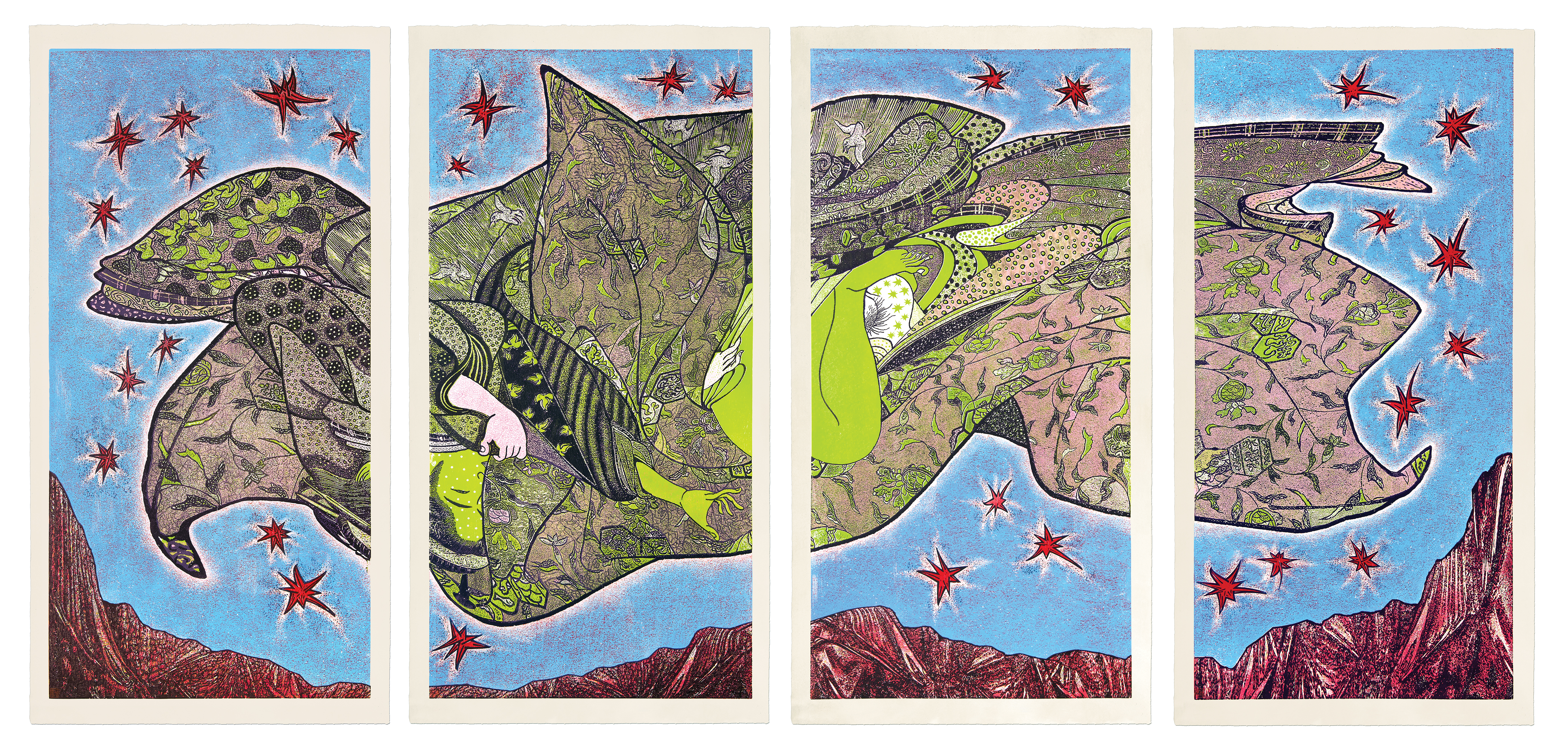
Endi Poskovic Sacrifice of Zuleikha

Elvedin Pošković was born on January 29, 1969, in Sarajevo, Bosnia and Herzegovina, which was then the former Socialist Federal Republic of Yugoslavia, Poskovic graduated from Secondary School of Applied Arts Sarajevo and Sarajevo Principal Music School Mladen Pozajiċin in 1986 before attending the University of Sarajevo Academy of Fine Arts from which he graduated in 1990 in the class of Professor Dževad Hozo.

Between 1985 and 1989, Poskovic performed traditional music of Southeastern Europe and the Balkans and toured folk music festivals throughout Yugoslavia, as well as Western Europe and Western Asia. In the summer of 1990, Poskovic left SFR Yugoslavia to study in Norway on a Norwegian Government scholarship where he enrolled in Norwegian language immersion program at Nordmøre Folkehøgskole in Surnadal Municipality and studied drawing and painting with Jon Arne Mogstad. From Norway, Poskovic moved to the United States in 1991 to study with Harvey Breverman and Adele Henderson at the University at Buffalo, State University of New York where he graduated in 1993 with a Master of Fine Arts degree in art practice. While in Buffalo, New York, and in the years following, Poskovic exhibited at several major Western New York venues including the Burchfield Penney Art Center (1994 to 1995), the Albright-Knox Art Gallery, Hallwalls Contemporary Arts Center, and the Castellani Art Museum. Since 1991, Poskovic has lived in New York, Indiana, California, North Carolina, Illinois, Nebraska, and Michigan where he has taught at several universities and colleges. In 2008, Poskovic moved to Ann Arbor where he now teaches at the University of Michigan as Professor of Art and Design in the Penny W. Stamps School of Art & Design and Faculty Associate in the Center for Russian, East European and Eurasian Studies (CREES). In 2015, Poskovic was awarded a Fulbright Program U.S. Senior Scholar Grant for 2015-2016 academic year to Jan Matejko Academy of Fine Arts in Kraków, Poland, to research the formative years of the Kraków International Triennial and the role it played in the democratization of art and education in Poland and beyond.

Since 2003, Poskovic has actively traveled to China and Japan to research wood-block printing, painting, and papermaking. He has studied at China Academy of Art, Central Academy of Fine Arts, and Tokyo University of the Arts and visited Beijing, Changsha, Hangzhou, Nagoya, Suzhou, and Tokyo.

== Work ==
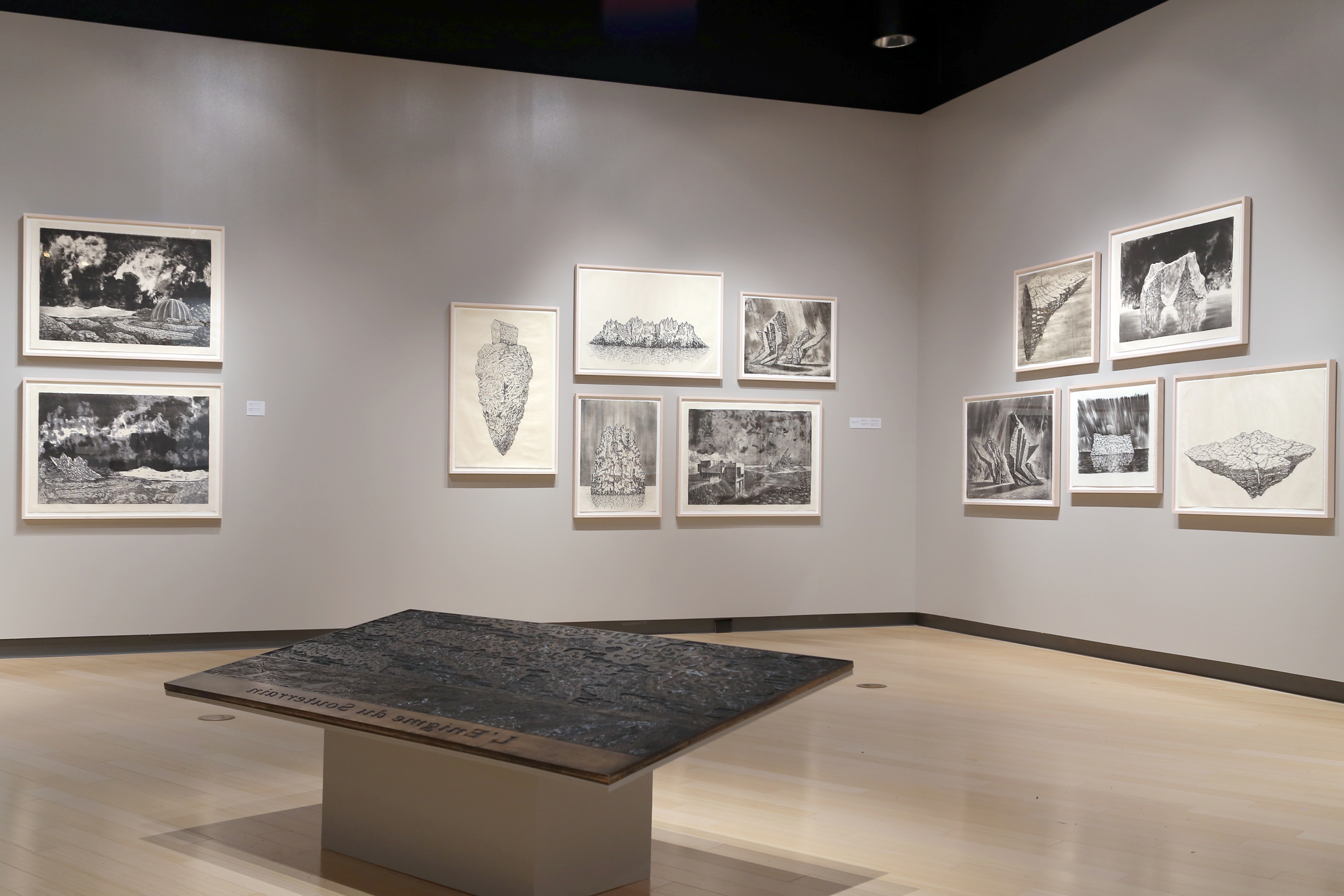
Endi Poskovic exhibition of Crossing Series of lithographs at Rockefeller Art Center, SUNY-Fredonia, New York

Working in a range of print media from relief printing, intaglio, lithography to hybrid techniques, Poskovic's early graphic works typically juxtapose a strong central image with seemingly unrelated text in a foreign or imaginary language evoking a multileveled meaning. Writing for the Omaha Reader, artist Mary Day states that "Gazing at one of these prints becomes an apprehension of the unseen and unknown. The unknown being what came before, and after, this particular moment captured in an amalgam of image, text, paper, and ink." In recent years, Poskovic has worked extensively in lithography printmaking in collaboration with Tamarind Institute master printer Jill Graham at Open Studio Toronto, as well as NSCAD University in Halifax, Nova Scotia, producing a series of stone lithographic prints and animation Crossing Series. Poskovic's Crossing Series assimilates memory and reality as a way to underscore a personal tale of discovery. Working through additive and subtractive stone lithography printing and short animations to depict topography specific to Southeastern Herzegovina and Dalmatia region, Poskovic indirectly examines the recent political and demographic shifts in the country of his birth. The achromatic lithographs, based on small aluminum models Poskovic makes, are filmed and drawn directly on limestone from the film stills. The classical drawing’s translation through lithography’s dense method pays homage to the history of the process invented in 1796 by German author and playwright Alois Senefelder. In these works, Poskovic invokes the works of Frederic Edwin Church, Caspar David Friedrich, Edvard Munch, and Winslow Homer. In the animations, simple, eloquent transitions from image to image, such as an iceberg gradually morphing into a cloud, or a stormy, rain-filled cloud evaporating into nothing, create a familiar, yet unsettling experience. This hybrid blend of drawing, print, and animation creates an amalgam of possibilities, in which the unfamiliar becomes almost tactile, while the familiar (rocks, clouds, water) provides a handhold on reality.

== Public collections ==
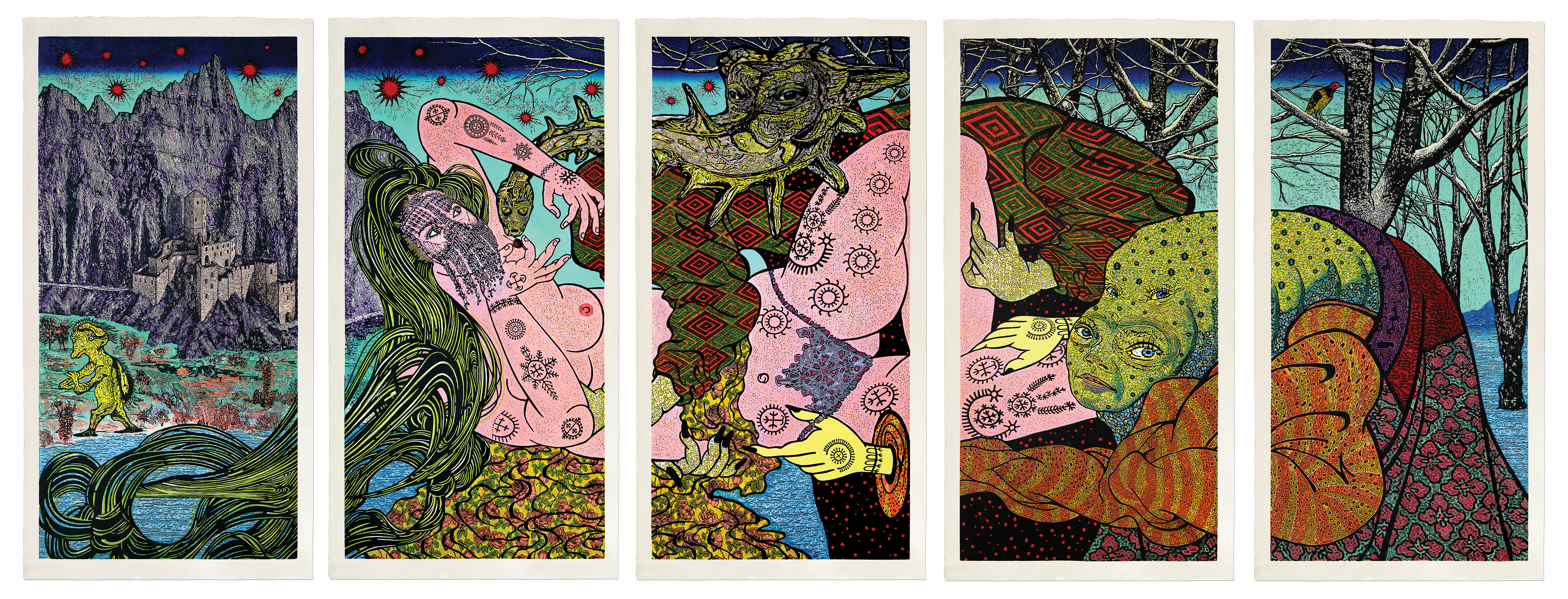
Endi Poskovic, Primavera Hagar and the Angeles in the Wilderness, color woodcut print on kozo paper

Poskovic's works are in the permanent public collections of the Philadelphia Museum of Art, the Aberystwyth University Museum of Art, the University of Iowa Stanley Museum of Art, Harvard University Fogg Museum, Detroit Institute of Arts, Des Moines Art Center, U.S. State Department Art in Embassies Program, Grand Valley State University, Indianapolis Museum of Art, Burchfield Penney Art Center, Art Museum of Estonia, The University of California, Berkeley Graphic Arts Collection. the McClung Museum of Natural History and Culture, Castellani Art Museum, City of Seattle Office of Arts & Culture and many others.

== Significant awards and honors ==
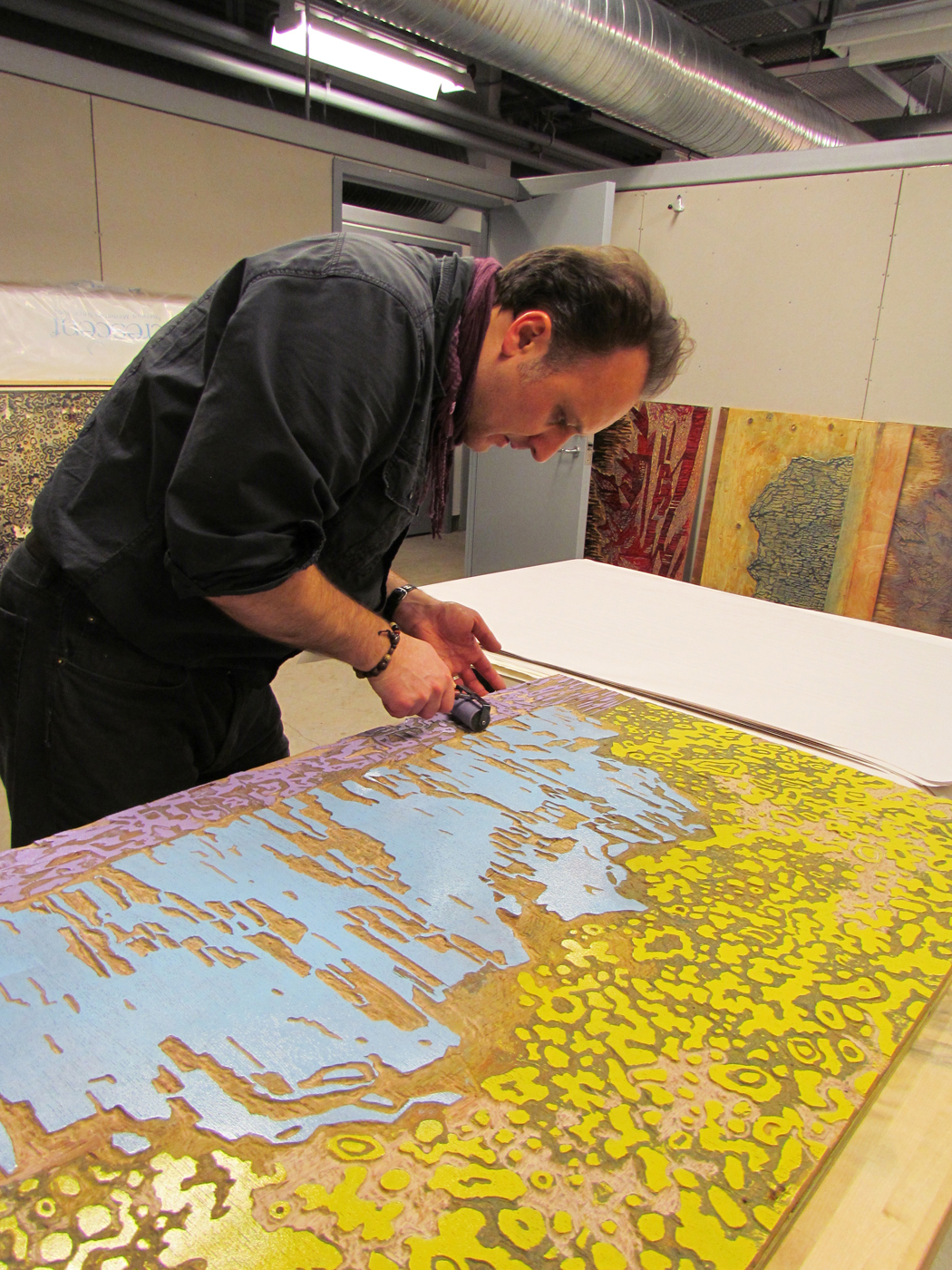
Endi Poskovic inking a color wood-relief block

- 1990 - Norwegian Government – Memorial Foundation of May 8 Scholarship
- 1994 - The Art Matters Foundation Grant
- 1995 - New York State Council on the Arts-Western New York Residency Fellowship
- 1997 - Indiana Arts Commission-Connection Fellowship in Visual Arts
- 1998 - Camargo Foundation Fellowship in Cassis, France (1999)
- 1999 - MacDowell Colony Fellowship
- 1999 - grant, Pollock-Krasner Foundation
- 2002 - fellowship, Kala Art Institute
- 2008 - Durfee Foundation ARC Grant
- 2010 - John D. Rockefeller Foundation Fellowship at the Bellagio Study Center, Bellagio, Italy
- 2011-12 - John Simon Guggenheim Memorial Foundation Fellowship
- 2015-16 - Fulbright Program U.S. Senior Scholar Grant to Poland as Artist-in-Residence at Jan Matejko Academy of Fine Arts in Kraków
- 2025 - Artica Svalbard Artist Residency in Longyearbyen, Svalbard

Poskovic has also received artist-in-residence fellowships from the Bemis Center for Contemporary Arts, McColl Center for Visual Art, Open Studio Toronto, VCCA, Frans Masereel Centrum in Belgium, Can Serrat International Art Center and Fundación Valparaíso, both in Spain, MI-LAB (Mokuhanga Innovation Lab) in Japan, amongst others.
