= Himzo Selimović =

Head of the Ministry of Internal Affairs
- In office 2010–2014
- Prime Minister: Suad Zeljković

Personal details
- Born: 23 March 1961 (age 65) Foča, SR Bosnia and Herzegovina, Yugoslavia

Himzo Selimović (born 23 March 1961) served as the Head of the Ministry of Internal Affairs, or Director of the Directorate for Coordination of Police Bodies, until 2014 when he resigned as a result of countrywide anti-government riots in Bosnia and Herzegovina.

Selimović originally became a police officer in the early 1980s in Foča, and later in Goražde, Fojnica and the Sarajevo suburb Ilijaš. Between 2002 and 2010 he served as the Police Commissioner of the Ministry of the Sarajevo Canton. Selimović was elected the Head of the Ministry of Internal Affairs on 9 March 2010.

== 2014 Bosnian unrest and resignation ==
Selimović submitted his resignation as the Head of the Ministry of Internal Affairs (a.k.a. Ministry of Security) on 9 February 2014 during the riots and protests throughout his country. Unlike other politicians and leaders who left post during the countrywide unrest, Selimović was not forced to resign by protesters; telling reports during a press conference in Sarajevo that the reason behind his resignation was due to his inability to guarantee security for the politicians of Bosnia and Herzegovina during the riots. He said during the news conference that Ministry of Interior did everything it could in cooperation with the police to prevent riots in Sarajevo, but failed. Multiple government buildings were set ablaze between 6–7 February, including the 130-year-old Bosnian Presidency Palace.

After two days of peaceful protests, the demonstrations turned into riots and Selimović said he would withdraw his candidacy for re-election as the Head of the Ministry of Internal Affairs. "When the members of the Bosnian Presidency asked if I could guarantee security, I told them that in these conditions with the constant tension, that can not be guaranteed," Selimović was quoted as saying. Not long after withdrawing his candidacy, he also filed resignation paperwork, saying he would officially resign when his position had been filled by someone else. Selimović was the Head of the Ministry of Security during the 2013 JMBG protest in Sarajevo.
