= Ibran Mustafić =

Bosniak politician

Personal details
- Born: 25 July 1960 (age 66)
- Party: Party of Democratic Action (1990–present)
- Occupation: Politician; Writer

Ibran Mustafić (born 25 July 1960) is a Bosnian politician in the Party of Democratic Action party (SDA), and a former soldier in the Bosnian Army. He is the author of Planirani Haos 1990–1996 ("Planned Chaos"), a book about events in besieged Srebrenica during the Bosnian War. He was arrested in 1996 by the Republika Srpska authorities as the third on the list of war crimes perpetrators from Srebrenica. The RS wanted to exchange him for Aleksa Krsmanović. He was released a year later.

He accused the Bosnian government of ordering attacks against Serbs within the U.N. safe area so any Serb response would lead the Muslims "into a catastrophe". He also asserts that the Clinton administration was complicit in the Srebrenica massacre by watching and not doing anything to stop it. In 2008, he was attacked and beaten by unidentified youngsters in Srebrenica.
