= Rialda =

Bosnian pop musician, television personality and model (born 1992)

- Born: Rialda Karahasanović; 12 November 1992 (age 33); Sarajevo, Bosnia and Herzegovina
- Occupations: Recording artist; Reality star
- Musical career
- Genres: pop
- Instrument: vocals

Rialda Karahasanović (born 12 November 1992), known professionally as just Rialda, is a Bosnian pop musician, television personality and model. Rialda competed in seasons' five and seven of the televised singing contest Zvijezda možeš biti ti (You Can Be a Star).

== Early and personal life ==
Rialda Karahasanović was born in besieged Sarajevo on 12 November 1992. The daughter of the leader of the Sarajevo band Sarr e Roma, Amir Karahasanović, Rialda grew up in a musical household. Her brother Ajdin is four years younger. She is Muslim.

== Career ==
In 2012, she auditioned for the fifth season of the televised singing contest Zvijezda možeš biti ti (You Can Be a Star) on Hayat TV, but dropped out several weeks in. She competed again in the seventh season two years later and made it to the finals in May 2015. During the competition, most of the songs she sang were originally by Croatian pop star Severina, with the Sarajevo-based magazine Ekskluziva even calling her the "Bosnian Severina".

Rialda's first single "Korak do dna" premiered 9 September 2015. The song was written by Đorđe Jovančić and produced by Amil Lojo.
