= Dzeny =

Bosnian singer (born 1987)

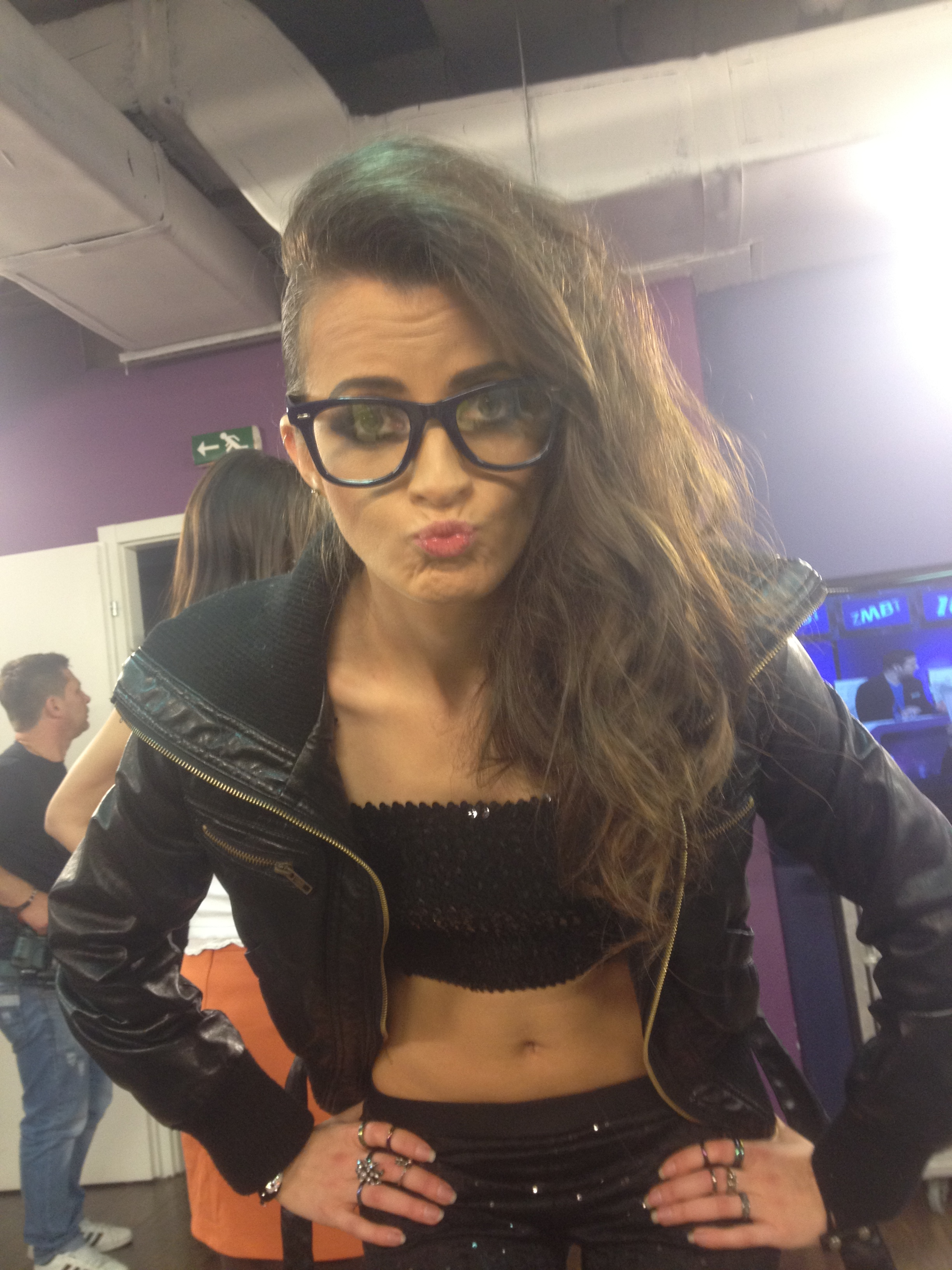
- Dzeny in Bosnian Idol in 2014

Background information
- Born: Dženita Zekić; 31 January 1987 (age 39); Trebinje, Yugoslavia
- Occupation: Singer
- Years active: 2011–present
- Website: dzenyofficial.com

Dženita Zekić (born 31 January 1987), known by the stage name Dzeny, is a Bosnian singer-songwriter.

== Early life ==
Dženita Zekić was born in Bosnia and Herzegovina, but grew up in Gothenburg, Sweden. At the age of nine, she began recording and mixing songs through a computer recording program. When Dzeny attended a music class at Bergsjöskolan in high school, she started to sing, dance, and play musical instruments.

== Career ==
Dzeny collaborated with several Bosnian and Swedish celebrities, including Fahrudin Pecikoza and Mahir Sarihodzic, with whom she recorded her single, "Kad Zvona Zazvone", in 2012. This single reached several mass media in Bosnia and Herzegovina

Her songs were also seen as No. 1 on other sites such as ubetoo.com, which also published an interview about Dzeny, as their first success story, calling it "Passion! And lots of time, nerves and effort".

In an interview for Avaz Express magazine, Dzeny went on through a heavy path collaborating with numerous indie labels, stating that not everyone can be trusted in the music industry. Having gone through many disappointments, her former manager wrecked the opportunity for her career, leading to the end of those collaborations. Dzeny's next single album, "Zena Zvijer" (lit. 'The Beast'), was released in December 2014 with NTV Hayat doo.

== Philanthropy ==
Dzeny was nominated as the Philanthropist of the Year in 2014 by the Bosnian foundation Mozaik.ba, along with 16 other companies and 20 other people.
