= Nasiha Kapidžić-Hadžić =

Bosnian writer (1932-1995)

- Born: Nasiha Kapidžić; 6 December 1932; Banja Luka, Kingdom of Yugoslavia
- Died: 22 September 1995 (aged 62); Sarajevo, Bosnia and Herzegovina
- Occupations: Poet, writer

Nasiha Kapidžić-Hadžić (6 December 1932 – 22 September 1995) was a Bosnian children's author and poet. Her first children's book, Maskenbal u šumi ("Maskerade in the Woods"), was published in 1962.

She has won awards for her works, and after death her house was declared a national monument, she was memorialised as a stamp.

== Biography ==
She was born in Banja Luka, Bosnia and Herzegovina; then Yugoslavia on 6 December 1931. Her father, Hadžić Ali Effendi Kapidžić, was a senior Imam in Royal Yugoslav Army. As a little girl she had leg surgery and wore a cast, rendering her bedridden. Six-year-old Nasiha began writing for the first time during her recovery.

She attended elementary and high school in Banja Luka and moved to Belgrade to study at the University of Belgrade's Faculty of Philosophy, where she earned her academic degree. She later taught at Banja Luka Gymnasium and was a radio producer for children shows on Radio Sarajevo.

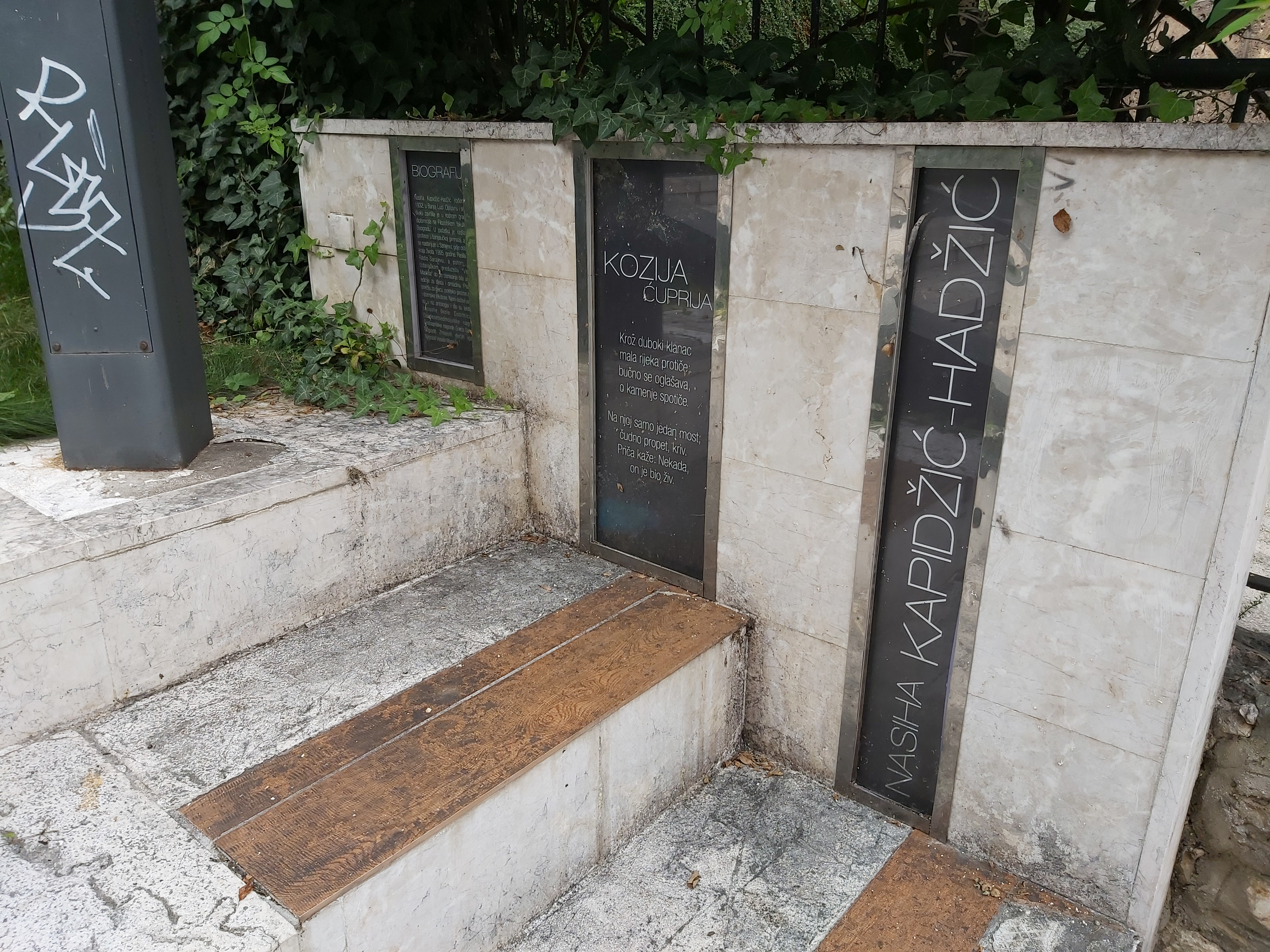
Dedication to Kapidžić-Hadžić in Sarajevo

Kapidžić-Hadžić's was first published in 1962 where work A Masquerade in the Woods was included in an anthology. She would go on to write poems, stories and plays, some of which have been translated to other languages, others have become set texts for schools. Her final published work was a collection of her radio plays in the 1980s.

Kapidžić-Hadžić was living in Sarajevo during the 1990s siege, and died due to her poor health during this time on 22 September 1995. She was survived by her daughter, Aida.

On 15 April 1996 a national stamp was issued in her honour. A stairway, decorated with poems of seven writers featuring Kapidžić-Hadžić was opened in 2013.

== Kapidžić House ==
Kapidžić-Hadžić childhood home was recognised as a National Monuments of Bosnia and Herzegovina and given protected status in the country for its links to the author. There is a memorial with the poem, Vezeni most ("Embroidered Bridge") at the home.The house was built in the 18th century and is located in Mejdan, Banja Luka Kapidžić-Hadžić's father bought it in 1920 from Muhamed Bey Kulenović.

== Bibliography ==
- Maskenbal u šumi ("Masquerade in the Woods", 1962)
- Vezeni most ("Embroidered Bridge", 1965)
- Od zmaja do viteza ("From Dragon to Knight", 1970)
- Skrivena priča ("Hidden Tale", 1971)
- Poslanica tiha ("Silent Letter", 1972)
- Kad si bila mala ("When You Were a Little Girl", 1973)
- San o livadici ("The Dream About Meadows", 1974)
- Od tvog grada do mog grada ("From Your City to Mine", 1975)
- Glas djetinjstva ("The Voice of Childhood", 1975)
- Šare mog šešira ("The Ornaments of My Hat")
- Liliput (1977)
- Šare djetinjstva ("The Ornaments of Childhood", 1977)
- Događaj u Loncipunumu ("The Event in Loncipunum", 1977)
- Lete, lete laste ("The Swallows Fly")
- Vrbaška uspavanka ("Willow Lullaby")
- Vujo, Vučko, Vuk
- Krilo i šapa ("Wing and Paw")
- Trčimo za suncem ("We Chase After the Sun")
- Taj patuljak ("That Dwarf")
- Pjetlić, svraka i proljeće ("The Rooster, the Magpie and Springtime")
- Sto vukova ("One Hundred Wolves")
- Šuma i pahuljice ("The Forest and the Snowflake)
- Nenina bašta ("Grandmother's Garden")
- Pod beharom moje janje spava ("My Lamb Sleeps Under the Blossoms")

== Awards and honors ==
- Dvadeset-sedmojulska nagrada (27 July award)
- Nagrada Veselin Masleša (Veselin Masleša Award)
- Šestoaprilska nagrada Grada Sarajeva (Sixth of April Sarajevo Award)
- Nagrada Zmajevih dečijih igara (Children's Games Award of Zmaj)
