= Almedin Fetahović =

Bosnian male boxer

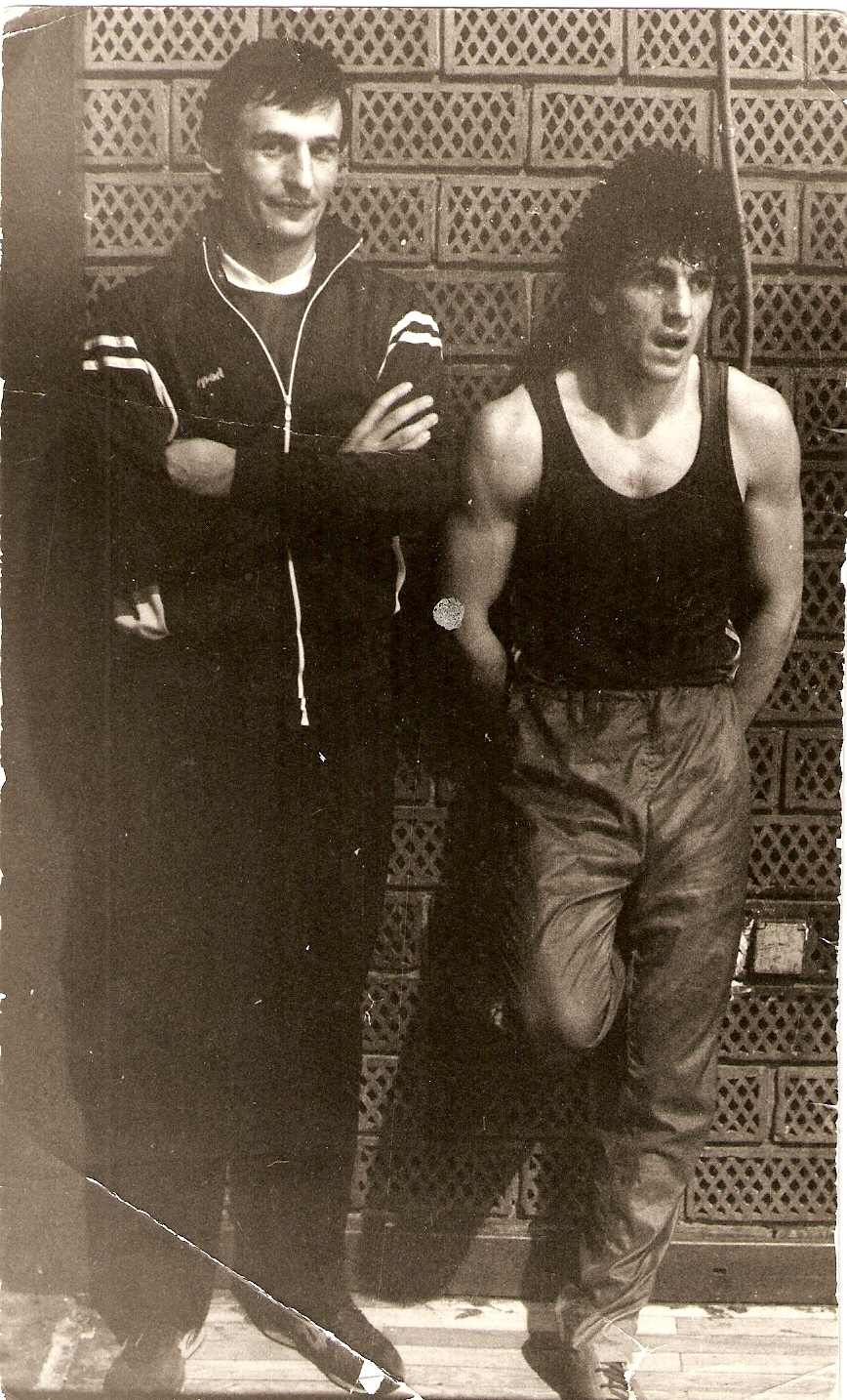
- Fetahović (right) with Hamid Guska in 1989

Personal information
- Nationality: Bosnian
- Born: 19 May 1964 (age 62) Sarajevo, SR Bosnia and Herzegovina, SFR Yugoslavia
- Weight: Light middleweight Welterweight

Boxing career
Medal record
Men's boxing
Representing Bosnia and Herzegovina
Mediterranean Games
| Gold medal – first place | 1993 Languedoc | 71 kg |

Almedin Fetahović (born 19 May 1964) is a Bosnian professional boxing coach and former amateur boxer.

He is best known for winning the gold medal at the 1993 Mediterranean Games in France. It was the first gold medal ever for Bosnia and Herzegovina at a major international multi-sport event.

In the quarterfinals of the -71 kg category Fetahović defeated 1995 All-Africa Games Gold medalist Mohamed Marmouri, while in the semifinals he beat 1992 European Junior Championships Bronze medalist Salvatore Munno.

In the finals he defeated 1996 Olympic silver medalist Malik Beyleroğlu. The final result was 12:8. .

In 1989, he won the Yugoslav National Championship in Welterweight. At the 1995 World Amateur Boxing Championships in Berlin, Fetahović defeated Lawrence Murphy from Scotland and lost to Józef Gilewski from Poland.

== Achievements and awards ==
1993

- Gold Mediterranean Games – Languedoc-Roussillon, FRA – Light middleweight

Awards

- Bosnian Coach of the Year: 2008
