= Nela Hasanbegović =

Bosnian sculptor (born 1984)

- Born: Nela Hasanbegović; 21 January 1984 (age 42); Sarajevo, SR Bosnia and Herzegovina, Yugoslavia
- Known for: Sculpting
- Notable work: Between light and darkness, Poles
- Website: Nela Hasanbegović

Nela Hasanbegović (born 21 January 1984) is a Bosnian sculptor. She graduated from the High School of High Arts in Sarajevo in the Department of Sculpting in 2002. She then graduated from the Academy of Fine Arts in Sarajevo in 2007. She is a member of the Association of Visual Artists of Bosnia and Herzegovina from 2007. Since 2011, she is a member of the Association of Culture and Red Arts. She participated in many solo and group exhibitions.

== Works ==
- Between Light and Darkness
- Poles
