= Sanela Sijerčić =

Bosnian folk singer from Sarajevo

- Born: 24 September 1976 (age 49); Sarajevo, SR Bosnia and Herzegovina, Yugoslavia
- Genres: Pop-folk
- Instrument: Singing
- Labels: Nimfa Sound

Sanela Sijerčić is a Bosnian folk singer from Sarajevo. She has released six albums and received a "Folk Oscar" in 2006. She has also been named the "Female singer of the year" (in Bosnia). She reportedly "retired" from active recording and performing by 2009.

== Discography ==
- Kap po kap (1995)
- Odgovori (1998)
- Srce od papira (2000)
- Rodjendan (2002)
- Fenix (2005)
