= Memnun Hadžić =

Bosnian male boxer

Personal information
- Nationality: Bosnia and Herzegovina
- Born: 20 January 1981 (age 45) Sarajevo, SR Bosnia and Herzegovina, SFR Yugoslavia

Sport
- Sport: Boxing
- Weight class: Super Heavyweight
Medal record
European Amateur Championships
Bronze medal – third place	2008 Liverpool	Super Heavyweight

Memnun Hadžić (born 20 January 1981) is a Bosnian former boxer. As an amateur he reached the quarterfinals at the 2005 Mediterranean Games in Almeria and won bronze medal at the 2008 European Amateur Boxing Championships in Liverpool, UK. In December 2009 he became professional.

== Highlights ==
(bronze) European championships, Liverpool, UK, November 2008:

- 1/8: Bye
- 1/4: Defeated Rok Urbanc (Slovenia) 5:2
- 1/2: Lost to Denis Sergeev (Russia) AB 3

(gold) Memorijal Hakija Turajlić, Sarajevo, Bosnia and Herzegovina, June 2003:

- 1/2: Defeated Khaled Mustafa el-Sadik (Qatar) 14:2
- Finals: Defeated Dimitar Stoymenov (Bulgaria) 10:0

(gold) Memorijal Hakija Turajlić, Sarajevo, Bosnia and Herzegovina, June 2005:

- 1/2: Defeated Ibrahim Hassan al-Zaabi (United Arab Emirates) RSCO 2
- Finals: Defeated Tomislav Antelj (Serbia and Montenegro) 10:5

(gold) Memorijal Hakija Turajlić, Sarajevo, Bosnia and Herzegovina, June 2009:

- 1/2: Defeated Abdul Rahman Ramadan (Kuwait) AB 3
- Finals: Defeated Goran Despotović (Serbia) 10:1

(bronze) Arena Cup, Pula, Croatia, May 2009:

- 1/4: Defeated Zsolt Bogdan (Hungary) 10:5
- 1/2: Lost to Razvan Cojanu (Romania) 8:3
