= List of Bosnia and Herzegovina people =

This is a list of notable people of Bosnia and Herzegovina. The people of Bosnia and Herzegovina are known by the demonym "Bosnians", which includes people belonging to the three main constituent groups (Bosniaks, Croats and Serbs).

== Arts ==
=== Fine arts ===
- Adi Granov – comic book artist
- Braco Dimitrijević – conceptual artist
- Endi E. Poskovic – printmaker and artist
- Gabrijel Jurkić – painter
- Safet Zec – painter and graphic designer
- Šejla Kamerić – video art and installation
- Helena Klakocar – cartoonist
- Maya Kulenovic – painter (Canada)
- Mersad Berber – painter
- Nesim Tahirović – painter
- Irfan Brkovic – visual artist
- Lazar Drljača – painter
- Slobodan Pejić – painter and sculptor
- Ismet Rizvić – painter
- Todor Švrakić – painter
- Zuko Džumhur – cartoonist
- Adela Jušić – visual artist
- Florijan Mićković – sculptor

=== Architecture ===
- Selma Harrington – architect and designer
- Vesna Bugarski – Bosnia-Herzegovina's first female architect
- Ivan Štraus – architect, academician
- Zlatko Ugljen – architect
- Hasan Cemalovic – architect
- Ivan Ceresnjes – architect
- Selman Selmanagić – architect

=== Composition ===
- Franciscus Bossinensis – composer
- Dino Zonić – composer and conductor
- Nihad Hrustanbegovic – composier, concert artist, accordionist and pianist
- Miroslav Čangalović – Bosnian opera and concert singer
- Lotfi Bouchnak – Tunisian singer, ud player, composer and public figure
- Flory Jagoda – composer and singer
- Merima Ključo – concert accordionist

=== Theatre and performing arts ===
- Tea Alagic (born 1972) – Bosnian-American theatre director
- Adnan Hasković – actor
- Aleksandra Romanić – pianist
- Branko Đurić – actor, director, original member of the cult comedy Top Lista Nadrealista line-up
- Davor Dujmović – actor
- Enis Bešlagić – actor
- Haris Pašović – director
- Josip Pejaković – actor
- Matusja Blum - pianist
- Midhat Ajanović – film theorist, animator and novelist
- Mustafa Nadarević – actor
- Oskar Danon – composer and conductor
- Vedran Smailović – cellist
- Vladimir Valjarević – pianist
- Zijah Sokolović – actor, director
- Zoran Bečić – actor and director
- Arijana Marić Gigliani – opera singer
- Zlatko Topčić – playwright
- Safet Plakalo — playwright, founder of Sarajevo War Theatre

=== Literature ===
- Ivo Andrić – writer, Nobel Laureate
- Meša Selimović – writer
- Branko Ćopić – writer
- Aleksa Šantić – poet
- Aleksandar Hemon – writer
- Abdulah Sidran – writer
- Petar Kočić – writer
- Isak Samokovlija – writer
- Mak Dizdar – poet
- Mehmed Begić – poet
- Miljenko Jergović – writer
- Semezdin Mehmedinovic – writer
- Jovan Dučić – poet
- Zaim Topčić – writer
- Zlatko Topčić – writer
- Prokopije Čokorilo – traveler, writer and historian
- Nićifor Dučić – writer
- Staka Skenderova – writer

== Science and technology ==
- Mahmut Bajraktarević – mathematician
- Rifat Hadžiselimović – genetist
- Asaf Duraković – physician and expert in nuclear medicine and depleted uranium
- Asim Kurjak – physician, gynecologist
- Asim Peco – linguist and professor of philology at the University of Belgrade
- Vladimir Prelog – chemist, Nobel Laureate
- Irfan Škiljan – creator of freeware image viewer IrfanView

== Popular culture ==
=== Film, radio and television ===
- Aida Begić – film director
- Ademir Kenović – film director and producer François Chalais Prize
- Adnan Hasković – actor
- Bekim Fehmiu – actor
- Danis Tanović – Academy Award, Golden Globe, Berlin Film Festival, Cannes Film Festival-winning director and screenwriter
- Haris Pašović – theatre and film director
- Emir Kusturica – film director, two time Palme d'Or winner
- Hajrudin Krvavac – film director
- Harun Mehmedinović – filmmaker, photographer, author
- Ivana Miličević – actress, notable appearances in Seinfeld, Felicity, among others
- Jasmila Žbanić – film director, Academy Award nominee, BAFTA nominee, 2006 Golden Bear winner
- Jasmin Dizdar – film director
- Karl Malden – actor, Oscar winner, and the former president of the Academy of Motion Picture Arts and Sciences. His family originates from Bileća.
- Nenad Dizdarević – film director
- Pjer Žalica – film director
- Srđan Vuletić – filmmaker
- Tarik Filipović – actor
- Vehid Gunić – TV presenter
- Zaim Topčić – editor of the Sarajevo radio station
- Zlatko Topčić – screenwriter

=== Music ===
- Adi Lukovac – musician, music producer, founder of band Adi Lukovac & Ornamenti
- Alen Islamović – musician, one-time frontman of Divlje Jagode i Bijelo Dugme
- Aljoša Buha – member of the original line-up of Crvena Jabuka, killed in a car accident
- Alma Čardžić – pop singer
- Amila Glamočak – pop singer, represented Bosnia and Herzegovina at the 1994 Eurovision Song Contest
- Baja Mali Knindža - folk singer
- Branko Grković – composer, pianist, and writer on music
- Beba Selimović – sevdalinka singer
- Boris Novković – singer-songwriter
- Brano Likić – composer and founder of Rezonansa
- Dado Džihan – composer, producer, one-time member of Zabranjeno pušenje and Top lista nadrealista
- Davor Badrov – singer
- Davorin Popović – singer and frontman of Indexi
- Deen – former leader of the boyband Seven Up, represented Bosnia and Herzegovina at the 2004 Eurovision Song Contest
- Dejan Matić – folk singer
- Damir Imamović – sevdalinka singer
- Dina Bajraktarević – sevdalinka and folk singer
- Dino Merlin – pop singer-songwriter, represented Bosnia and Herzegovina at the 1999 Eurovision Song Contest and the 2011 Eurovision Song Contest
- Donna Ares – singer-songwriter, and musician
- DJ Krmak – singer
- Dragi Šestić – music producer
- Dražen Ričl a.k.a. Zijo – original frontman for Crvena Jabuka
- Dražen Žerić a.k.a. Žera – original member of Crvena Jabuka and its current frontman
- Duško Kuliš – folk singer
- Edo Maajka – rapper, leader of rap group Disciplinska komisija
- Elvir Laković Laka, rock music singer-songwriter
- Esad Plavi – pop-folk singer
- Goran Bregović – musician and composer, founder of Bijelo Dugme
- Hakala – folk singer
- Halid Bešlić – folk singer
- Hanka Paldum – sevdalinka singer
- Haris Džinović – folk singer
- Hajrudin Varešanović – a.k.a. Hari Mata Hari pop singer and songwriter, represented Bosnia and Herzegovina at the 2006 Eurovision Song Contest and finished in 3rd place
- Himzo Polovina – sevdalinka singer
- Igor Vukojević – singer
- Indira Radić – folk singer
- Jadranka Stojaković – pop singer
- Jasmin Muharemović – pop-folk singer
- Jura Stublić – rock singer
- Kemal Malovčić – popular Bosnian etno-psyhodelic singer
- Kemal Monteno – singer, musician, and songwriter
- Kornelije Kovač – composer, musician, member of the original line-up of Indexi, founder of Korni grupa
- Lepa Brena – pop-folk singer
- Marinko Rokvić – folk singer
- Mate Bulić – pop-folk singer
- Maya Berović – pop star
- Meho Puzić – sevdalinka-folk singer
- Mile Kitić – turbofolk singer
- Miloš Bojanić – pop-folk singer
- Mirsada Bajraktarević – singer
- Mitar Mirić – singer
- Mladen Solomun – melodic house/techno DJ & producer
- Mladen Vojičić Tifa – singer
- Nada Mamula – sevdalinka singer
- Nada Topčagić – singer
- Nadja Benaissa – singer
- Nedeljko Bajić Baja – singer
- Nenad Janković – musician, original frontman of Zabranjeno pušenje, original member of the Top lista nadrealista line-up
- Nikša Bratoš – composer, producer, one-time member of Rezonansa and Valentino, member of Crvena Jabuka
- Nino Rešić – singer
- Osman Hadžić – folk singer
- Safet Isović – sevdalinka singer
- Sanja Maletić – pop-folk singer
- Saša Lošić – singer, composer and founder of the Plavi orkestar band
- Saša Matić – folk singer
- Sead Lipovača – original member of Divlje Jagode
- Sejo Sexon, – founder of Zabranjeno pušenje and current frontman of the Zagreb-based post-war line-up
- Seka Aleksić – pop-folk singer
- Selma Bajrami – singer
- Šemsa Suljaković, folk singer
- Šerif Konjević – folk singer
- Silvana Armenulić, folk and sevdalinka singer
- Tifa – singer and musician
- Tomo Miličević – guitarist for Thirty Seconds to Mars
- Vesna Pisarović – pop singer
- Vladimir Savčić Čobi – singer
- Zaim Imamović – sevdalinka singer
- Zdravko Čolić – pop singer
- Željko Bebek – musician and singer
- Željko Samardžić – pop-rock singer

== Politicians and historical figures ==
=== Medieval ===
- 14th century Vojvoda Bogut – first known ancestor of the House of Petrović-Njegoš, royal Family of Montenegro, ruler of Jablan Grad, near present-day Ugljevik, Bosnia and Herzegovina
- 14th century Đurađ Bogutović – son of Vojvoda Bogut and the 14th century nobleman, grandfather of Herak Heraković, the founding father of the Petrović-Njegoš and Heraković-Popović families of the Njeguši tribe
- 1154–1163 Ban Borić
- Hrvoje Vukčić Hrvatinić – Bosnian Duke, founder of the town of Jajce
- 1172–1204 Ban Kulin
- 1204–1232 Stjepan Kulinić
- 1232–1253 Matej Ninoslav
- 1254–1287 Prijezda I
- 1287–1290 Prijezda II
- 1267–1313 Stjepan I Kotromanić
- 1314–1353 Stjepan II Kotromanić
- 1353–1366 & 1367–zaljke
- 1391 Tvrtko I of Bosnia
- 1366–1367 Stjepan Vuk
- 1391–1395 Stephen Dabiša of Bosnia
- 1398–1404 & 1409–1418 Stephen Ostoja of Bosnia
- 1404–1409 & 1421–1433 & 1435–1442 Tvrtko II of Bosnia
- 1433–1435 Radivoj Ostojić
- 1443–1461 Stephen Thomas
- 1461–1463 Stephen Tomašević
- Elizabeth of Bosnia
- Dorothea of Bulgaria
- Dorothy Garai
- Jelena Gruba
- Jelena Nelipčić
- Katarina Kosača
- Kujava
- Mary of Serbia
- Vitača
- Sandalj Hranić, Sandalj Hranić Kosača, 1370–1435 – medieval nobleman from the House of Kosača
- Stjepan Vukčić Kosača a.k.a. Duke of Saint Sava Herceg Stjepan Kosača, Vojvoda of Hum (Herzegovina) – father of Bosnian Queen, Katarina Kosača Kotromanić
- Vlatko Vuković, Vlatko Vuković Kosača, died 1392 – medieval nobleman from the House of Kosača

=== Ottoman rule 1463–1878 ===
- Gazi Husrev-beg – military strategist and the greatest donor and builder of Sarajevo
- Husein Gradaščević a.k.a. Husein-kapetan, The Dragon of Bosnia – 19th century Bosnian nobleman and autonomy fighter
- Isa-Beg Isaković – general, first governor of the Ottoman province of Bosnia, and founder of the cities of Sarajevo and Novi Pazar
- Ivan Franjo Jukić
- Ferhad Pasha Sokolović – founder and designer of Banja Luka old town
- Mehmed Paša Sokolović a.k.a. Sokollu Mehmet Paşa – Grand Vizier to Suleyman the Magnificent and Selim II
- Damad Ibrahim Pasha – Grand Vizier
- Tiryaki Hasan Pasha a.k.a. Hasan-Paša Tiro – Bosnian national hero
- Osman Pazvantoğlu – Bosnia Ottoman soldier, a governor of the Vidin district after 1794, and a rebel against Ottoman rule.
- Ridwan Pasha – Ridwan dynasty

=== Austro-Hungarian occupation 1878–1918 ===
- Gavrilo Princip – member of black hand, Serb, and assassin of Archduke Franz Ferdinand, This assassination triggered World War I.

=== Kingdom of Yugoslavia 1918–1941 ===
- David Elazar – Chief of staff of the Israeli Defence Forces
- Džemaludin Čaušević – Reis-ul-ulema
- Mehmed Spaho – leader of the Yugoslavia Muslim Organisation

=== World War II ===
- Peter Tomich – World War II hero
- Rodoljub Čolaković – World War II war hero, People's Hero of Yugoslavia

=== Socialist Federal Republic of Yugoslavia 1943–1991 ===
==== Presidents of the Socialist Republic of Bosnia and Herzegovina 1943–1990 ====
- Kecmanović, Vojislav Đedo – (25 November 1943 – November 1946)
- Pucar, Đuro Stari – (November 1946 – September 1948)
- Šegrt, Vlado – (September 1948 – March 1953)
- Pucar, Đuro Stari – (December 1953 – June 1963)
- Dugonjić, Rato – (June 1963 – 1967)
- Bijedić, Džemal – (1967–1971)
- Pozderac, Hamdija – (1971 – May 1974)
- Dugonjić, Rato – (May 1974 – April 1978)
- Dizdarević, Raif – (April 1978 – April 1982)
- Mikulić, Branko – (April 1982 – 26 April 1984)
- Renovica, Milanko – (26 April 1984 – 26 April 1985.)
- Mesihović, Munir – (26 April 1985 – April 1987)
- Andrić, Mato – (April 1988 – April 1989)
- Filipović, Nikola – (April 1988 – April 1989)
- Piljak, Obrad – (April 1989 – December 1990)

==== Prime ministers of Bosnia and Herzegovina 1945–1990 ====
- Čolaković, Rodoljub – (27 April 1945 – September 1948)
- Pucar, Đuro Stari – (September 1948 – December 1953)
- Humo, Avdo – (December 1953 – 1956)
- Karabegović, Osman – (1956–1963)
- Brkić, Hasan – (1963–1965)
- Kolak, Rudi – (1965–1967)
- Mikulić, Branko – (1967–1969)
- Kosovac, Dragutin – (1969 – April 1974)
- Renovica, Milanko – (April 1974 – 28 April 1982)
- Maglajlija, Seid – (28 April 1982 – 28 April 1984)
- Ubiparip, Gojko – (28 April 1984 – April 1986)
- Lovrenović, Josip – (April 1986 – April 1988)

=== Bosnia presidents since 1990 ===
- Alija Izetbegović – (December 1990 – October 1996) (collective presidency chairman)
- Alija Izetbegović (October 1996 – October 1998) (collective presidency chairman)
- Živko Radišić – (October 1998 – June 1999)
- Ante Jelavić – (June 1999 – February 2000)
- Alija Izetbegović – (February 2000 – October 2000)
- Živko Radišić – (October 2000 – June 2001)
- Jozo Križanović – (June 2001 – February 2002)
- Beriz Belkić – (February 2002 – October 2002)
- Mirko Šarović – (October 2002 – April 2003)
- Borislav Paravac – (April 2003 – June 2003)
- Dragan Čović – (June 2003 – February 2004)
- Sulejman Tihić – (February 2004 – October 2004)
- Borislav Paravac – (October 2004 – June 2005)
- Ivo Miro Jović – (June 2005 – October 2006)
- Nebojša Radmanović – (part of collective presidency)
- Željko Komšić – (part of collective presidency)(collective presidency chairman)
- Haris Silajdžić – (part of collective presidency)

=== Other political figures since 1943 ===
- Adnan Terzić – politician, former Prime Minister of Bosnia and Herzegovina
- Boris Tadić – President of the Republic of Serbia
- Cvijetin Mijatović a.k.a. Majo – politician and one-time President of the Collective Presidency of the SFR Yugoslavia
- Irfan Ljubijankić – surgeon, composer, politician and diplomat
- Jovan Divjak – general of the Army of the Republic of Bosnia and Herzegovina during the 1992–1995 war, poet
- Mladen Ivanić – politician and diplomat
- Nikola Špirić – politician, Prime Minister of Bosnia and Herzegovina
- Stjepan Šiber – Deputy Commander of the B&H Army during the 1992–1995 conflict
- Vladimir Dedijer – Partisan fighter, politician, and historian
- Zlatko Lagumdžija – politician and diplomat
- Zoran Đinđić – prime minister of the Republic of Serbia, Mayor of Belgrade, and the philosopher

== Sportspeople ==
=== Team sports ===
Basketball

- Adnan Hodžić – basketball player
- Aleksandar Nikolić – "Father of Yugoslav Basketball"
- Anđa Jelavić – basketball player
- Bogdan Tanjević – basketball coach
- Borislav Stanković – former basketball player
- Damir Omerhodžić-Markota – NBA basketball player with the Milwaukee Bucks
- Damir Mršić – former basketball player
- Damir Mulaomerović – retired basketball player
- Dejan Bodiroga – voted first on the list by the fans worldwide for the Euroleague Basketball 2001–2010 All-Decade Team. His family originates from the village of Bodiroge near Trebinje
- Dragana Stanković – basketball player
- Dražen Dalipagić – basketball player, former Real Madrid player, Olympic medalist and FIBA Hall of Famer
- Džanan Musa – basketball player
- Emir Mutapčić – assistant coach of FC Bayern Munich and current coach of the Germany national team
- Edin Bavčić – former NBA basketball player with the Philadelphia 76ers
- Elmedin Kikanović – basketball player
- Jasmin Repeša – basketball coach
- Jelica Komnenović – former basketball player
- Jusuf Nurkić – basketball player
- Mile Ilić – former basketball player
- Mirza Delibašić – basketball player, former Bosna and Real Madrid player, Olympic medalist and FIBA Hall of Famer
- Bojan Bogdanović – basketball player (born in Mostar), former Real Madrid player
- Mirza Teletović – NBA basketball player the Brooklyn Nets
- Nedžad Sinanović – basketball player
- Nenad Marković – basketball coach and former basketball player
- Nihad Đedović – basketball player with Bayern Munich
- Predrag Danilović – basketball coach and former basketball player
- Razija Mujanović – former basketball player
- Robert Rothbart (born as Boris Kajmaković in 1986) – Bosnian-Israeli-American basketball player
- Saša Čađo – basketball player
- Slađana Golić – former basketball player
- Tima Džebo – former basketball player
- Vesna Bajkuša – former basketball player
- Vladimir Radmanović – NBA basketball player with the Los Angeles Lakers
- Zoran Planinić – NBA basketball player
- Zoran Savić – former basketball player
- Kornelija Kvesić – former basketball player
- Mara Lakić – former basketball player
- Mersada Bećirspahić – former basketball player
- Parker Huffman – former NBA basketball player

Football

- Boško Antić - former football player
- Ivica Osim – football coach and former footballer
- Safet Sušić – football coach and former footballer, Paris Saint-Germain and Ligue 1 great
- Josip Katalinski – former football player
- Asim Ferhatović – former football player
- Dušan Bajević – football coach and former player
- Vahid Halilhodžić – football coach and former footballer
- Enver Marić – former football goalkeeper
- Faruk Hadžibegić – former football player
- Blaž Slišković – football coach and former footballer
- Meho Kodro – former football player
- Sergej Barbarez – football player
- Elvir Baljić – football player
- Elvir Bolić – football player
- Arnela Šabanović – football player
- Emir Spahić – football player
- Edin Džeko – Manchester City (on loan to Roma) and Bosnia national team
- Ervin Zukanović - football player
- Vedad Ibišević – football player
- Asmir Begović – football goalkeeper
- Jasmin Burić – football goalkeeper
- Boro Primorac – football coach
- Edin Višća – football player
- Elvir Rahimić – football player
- Franjo Vladić – former footballer
- Muhamed Konjić – former footballer
- Vahidin Musemić – former football player
- Gradimir Crnogorac – football player
- Haris Medunjanin – football player
- Haris Škoro – former football player
- Hasan Salihamidžić – former Bayern Munich midfielder and second Bosnian to win Champions League
- Ibrahim Duro – former football player
- Irvin Latić - football player
- Izet Hajrović – football player
- Mario Stanić – former footballer
- Mehmed Baždarević – former footballer
- Mensur Mujdža – football player
- Miroslav Blažević – football coach
- Mirsad Fazlagić – former football player
- Miralem Pjanić – Juventus and Bosnia national team
- Muhamed Mujić – former footballer
- Mirsad Hibić – former footballer
- Predrag Pašić – football coach, former player
- Safet Nadarević – football player
- Sead Sušić – football player
- Saša Papac – football player
- Savo Milošević – football player
- Sead Kolašinac – football player
- Sejad Salihović – football player
- Senijad Ibričić – football player
- Zlatan Bajramović – football player
- Darko Maletić – football player
- Zvjezdan Misimović – football player
- Sulejman Halilović – former football player
- Tarik Hodžić – footballer
- Tomislav Piplica – former football player

Foreign footballers of Bosnian origin

– Australia national team

- Eli Babalj – forward for Adelaide United and the Australia national team
- Dino Djulbic – defender for Perth Glory and formerly the Australia national team

– Austria national team

- Marko Arnautović – striker Stoke City and Austria national team
- Zlatko Junuzovic – midfielder SV Werder Bremen and Austria national tean

– Croatia national team

- Alen Halilović – midfielder and Croatia national team
- Ante Ćorić – midfielder and Croatia national team
- Boris Živković – defender and Croatia national team
- Davor Šuker – retired Croatia national team striker
- Darijo Srna – midfielder and Croatia national team (Bosnia father)
- Dejan Lovren – defender and Croatia national team
- Goran Jurić – defender and Croatia national team
- Ivan Klasnić – striker Nantes and Croatia national team
- Ivan Rakitić – midfielder Sevilla and Croatia national team
- Jerko Leko – midfielder and Croatia national team
- Josip Šimunić – defender and Croatia national team
- Krunoslav Jurčić – defensive midfielder and Croatia national team
- Mario Mandžukić – striker Bayern Munich and Croatia national team
- Mario Stanić – retired midfielder Chelsea F.C. and Croatia national team
- Mario Tokić – defender and Croatia national team
- Mateo Kovačić – midfielder and Croatia national team
- Mato Neretljak – defender and Croatia national team
- Mladen Petrić – striker West Ham United and Croatia national team
- Niko Kovač – midfielder and Croatia national team
- Nikica Jelavić – striker Hull and Croatia national team
- Robert Kovač – defender and Croatia national team
- Stjepan Tomas – defender and Croatia national team
- Tin Jedvaj – defender and Croatia national team
- Vedran Ćorluka – defender Lokomotiv Moscow and Croatia national team
- Zoran Mamić – defensive midfielder and Croatia national team

– Germany national team

- Marko Marin – midfielder Sevilla and Germany national team

– Serbia national team

- Luka Jović – striker Real Madrid and Serbia national team
- Mladen Krstajić – defender Schalke 04 and Serbia national team
- Neven Subotić – defender Borrusia Dortmund and Serbia national team
- Ognjen Koroman – midfielder Red Star Belgrade and Serbia national team
- Savo Milošević – retired Serbia national team striker
- Zdravko Kuzmanović – midfielder AC Fiorentina and Serbia national team

– Slovenia national team

- Armin Bačinović – midfielder Palermo and Slovenia national team
- Zlatan Ljubijankić – retired striker and Slovenia national team
- Jasmin Kurtič – midfielder Sassuolo and Slovenia national team
- Mirnes Šišić – midfielder Olympiacos and Slovenia national team
- Samir Handanovič – goalkeeper Inter Milan and Slovenia national team
- Josip Iličić – midfielder Fiorentina and Slovenia national team
- Haris Vučkić – midfielder Newcastle United and Slovenia national team

– Sweden national team

- Zlatan Ibrahimović – striker Paris Saint-Germain and Sweden national team

– Switzerland national team

- Eldin Jakupović – goalkeeper Hull City and Switzerland national team
- Haris Seferovic – striker Real Sociedad and Switzerland national team

Handball

- Adnan Harmandić – handball player for HSG Wetzlar
- Abas Arslanagić – former handball player, gold medal at the 1972 Summer Olympics
- Benjamin Burić – handball player
- Bilal Šuman – handball player
- Danijel Šarić – goalkeeper for FC Barcelona Handbol
- Enid Tahirović – former handball goalkeeper
- Ermin Velić – former handball player, bronze medal at the 1980 Summer Olympics
- Jasna Kolar-Merdan – IHF World Player of the Year 1990
- Ćamila Mičijević – handball player for Croatia national team
- Irfan Smajlagić – former handball player, gold medal at the 1996 Summer Olympics
- Mirko Alilović – goalkeeper plays for Croatia national team
- Mirsad Terzić – handball player, captain of Bosnia national team
- Mirza Džomba – handball player, Olympic and World champion
- Muhamed Memić – handball player, World champion
- Muhamed Mustafić – handball player
- Muhamed Toromanović – handball player
- Slađana Topić – handball player
- Svetlana Dašić-Kitić – best female handball player ever by International Handball Federation
- Zlatan Arnautović – former handball player (Olympic Gold Medal 1984)
- Jasmina Janković – former goalkeeper Dutch National Team, currently goalkeeper coach for Dutch National Team and SG BBM Bietingheim

Volleyball

- Tijana Bošković, Serbia national team player, Olympic medalist
- Đorđe Đurić, Serbia national team player, Olympic medalist
- Brankica Mihajlović, Serbia national team player, Olympic medalist
- Jelena Blagojević, Serbia national team player
- Aleksandar Okolić, Serbia national team player
- Adis Lagumdžija, Turkish national team player
- Meliha Smajlović, Turkey national team player
- Sanja Starović, Serbia national team player
- Saša Starović, Serbia national team player

Water polo

- Milan Muškatirović
- Veselin Đuho
- Zoran Janković

=== Individual sports ===
Athletics

- Amel Tuka – middle-distance runner
- Ana Šimić – high jumper
- Borisav Pisić – hurdler
- Branko Dangubić – javelin thrower
- Dako Radošević – discus thrower
- Dragan Perić – shot putter
- Elvir Krehmić – high jumper
- Filip Mihaljević – shot putter
- Hamza Alić – shot putter
- Irvin Tahmaz – long jumper
- Ivan Ivančić – shot putter
- Sejad Krdžalić – javelin thrower
- Zlatan Saračević – shot putter

Chess

- Ivan Sokolov – chess player, Grandmaster since 1987
- Predrag Nikolić – chess player, Grandmaster since 1983
- Bojan Kurajica – chess player, Grandmaster
- Borki Predojević – grandmaster, top Bosnia chess player

Martial arts/boxing

- Anton Josipović – boxing, light heavyweight gold medal at the 1984 Summer Olympics
- Marijan Beneš – boxing, gold medal at the 1973 European Championship
- Tomislav Krizmanić – boxing, bronze medal at the 1953 European Championship
- Memnun Hadžić – boxing, bronze medal at the 2008 European championship
- Hamid Guska – boxing coach
- Almedin Fetahović – boxing
- Adnan Ćatić – boxing, reigning IBF world champion, former WBO champion, and a two time former WBA champion
- Jasmin Hasić – super heavyweight boxing best known for winning bronze medal at the European Junior Championships 2007 in Sombor
- Mirsad Bektić – mixed martial artist
- Arian Sadiković – pro. welterweight Kickboxer
- Amer Hrustanović – wrestler
- Amel Mekić – judo, European champion
- Larisa Cerić – judo, European championship medalist
- Davor Vlaškovac – judo, European championship medalist
- Zoran Prerad – taekwondo, European champion
- Nedžad Husić – taekwondo, 5th place at the 2020 Summer Olympics
- Arnela Odžaković – karate, two silver medals at the European Championships
- Dževad Poturak – retired super heavyweight kickboxer and former WKA European Champion and K-1 Fighting Network Prague 2007 tournament Champion

Tennis

- Alexandros Jakupovic – tennis player (Bosnia father)
- Amer Delić – tennis player
- Ivan Dodig – tennis player
- Ivan Ljubičić – tennis player
- Marin Čilić – tennis player
- Mervana Jugić-Salkić – tennis player
- Sandra Martinović – tennis player
- Damir Džumhur – tennis player
- Andrea Petkovic – tennis player, playing for Germany

Other

- Lana Pudar, swimmer
- Almir Velagić, weightlifter
- Nedžad Fazlija, sports shooter
- Andrea Arsović, sports shooter
- Bojan Tokič, table tennis player
- Jasna Fazlić, table tennis player
- Lejla Njemčević, cross-country and mountain bike cyclist
- Michi Halilović, skeleton racer
- Irvin Hušić, racing cyclist
- Milenko Zorić, canoer
- Radoje Đerić, rower
- Dino Beganovic, racing driver
- Srećko Pejović, sports shooter
- Velimir Stjepanović, swimmer
- Veselin Petrović, cyclist
- Nikola Kovač, Counter-Strike Player

== Religion ==
- Hasan Kafi Pruščak, Islamic scholar (1544–1615)
- Makarije Sokolović, Serbia Patriarch (s. 1557–1571)
- Antonije Sokolović, Serbia Patriarch (s. 1571–1575)
- Gerasim Sokolović, Serbia Patriarch (s. 1575–1586)
- Savatije Sokolović, Serbian Patriarch (s. 1587)
- Gavrilo II, Serbia Patriarch (s. 1752)
- Basil of Ostrog (1610–1671), Orthodox bishop of Zahumlje
- Visarion, Orthodox metropolitan of Herzegovina (s. 1590–1602)
- Savatije Ljubibratić, Orthodox metropolitan of Zahumlje and Dalmatia (s. 1693–1716)
- Nićifor Dučić (1832–1900), Orthodox theologian, historian, philologist and writer
- Jovica Ilić (fl. 1834–), Orthodox priest, rebel leader
- Pavle Tvrtković (fl. 1834–51), Orthodox priest, served at the Serbia court

== Other prominent people ==
- Adil Zulfikarpašić – businessman, one-time politician, and philanthropist, founder of the Bosniak Institute in Sarajevo
- Alija Sirotanović – coal-miner and worker-hero, his face was on the 10 and 20000 dinar banknotes
- Azra Hasanbegović – women's rights activist
- Boris Tadić – President of Serbia
- Branko Crvenkovski – Prime Minister of the Republic of Macedonia from 1992 to 1998 and again from 2002 to 2004, then President of the Republic of Macedonia from 2004 to 2009.
- Emerik Blum – founder of Energoinvest, former mayor of Sarajevo, arguably the most successful and influential businessman in the history of Bosnia and Herzegovina
- Ervin Rustemagić – comic book publisher, distributor, and rights agent
- Foto Boško (1944–1993) – Yugoslavian Craftsman Photographer from Banja Luka known for his work and contributions to the local community
- Fikret Hodžić – bodybuilder
- Kemal Curić – automobile designer known best for his work at Ford, where he was responsible for numerous concept and production cars
- Inga Peulich – Australia politician born in Bosnia and Herzegovina
- Irvin Mujčić – human rights activist and survivor of the Srebrenica genocide
- Omer Halilhodžić – automobile designer responsible for the styling of the 2004 Mitsubishi Colt, and the concept cars which preceded it: CZ2, CZ3, CZ3 cabriolet, and CZT. He has since penned the Mitsubishi Concept Sportback, and the Mitsubishi Concept X, which presages the Mitsubishi Lancer Evolution X production car.
- Mila Mulroney – wife of the 18th Prime Minister of Canada Brian Mulroney
- Suvada Selimović – pacifist activist
- Tijana Arnautović – model, Miss World Canada 2004
- Vladimir Ćorović – historian
- Zoran Đinđić – former Prime Minister of Serbia
- Nijaz Ibrulj – philosopher and professor at the University of Sarajevo
- Faruk Čaklovica – Professor of Bromatology and Rector of the University of Sarajevo
- Željko Topić – Croatia civil servant and vice-president of the European Patent Office born in Bosnia and Herzegovina
- Semir Osmanagić – author, businessman and pseudoarchaeologist

== Infamous people ==
- Andrija Artuković – minister in the government of the Independent State of Croatia and war criminal
- Ante Pavelić – Ustaše leader, founder and leader of the fascist Independent State of Croatia, war criminal
- Osman Kulenović – Vice President of the Government of the Independent State of Croatia
- Džafer Kulenović – Vice President of the Axis puppet state the Independent State of Croatia
- Alija Šuljak – military officer of Ustaše, one of the main perpetrators of the genocide of Serbs in Eastern Herzegovina, war criminal
- Vjekoslav Luburić – Ustaše leader, commander of the Jasenovac concentration camp, war criminal
- Miroslav Filipović – Ustaše leader, commander of the Jasenovac concentration camp, war criminal
- Zvonimir Vučković – Chetnik vojvoda during World War II
- Petar Baćović – head of the cabinet of the Ministry of Internal Affairs for Milan Nedić's puppet Government of National Salvation, Chetnik leader and war criminal
- Nikola Kalabić – Chetnik commander during World War II, war criminal
- Biljana Plavšić – politician, convicted by the International War Tribunal for war crimes during the Bosnian war
- Momčilo Krajišnik – politician, convicted by the International War Tribunal for war crimes and ethnic cleansing during the Bosnian war
- Radovan Karadžić – political leader of the Serbs during 1992–1995, indicted by the International War Tribunal for war crimes and genocide, most wanted man in Europe
- Ratko Mladić – General of the Serbia Army during 1992–1995, indicted by the International War Tribunal for war crimes and genocide, most wanted man in Europe alongside Karadžić
- Vojislav Šešelj – politician, radical extremist, Chetnik leader, indicted by the International War Tribunal for war crimes, ethnic cleansing, and crimes against humanity during the Bosnian war
- Slobodan Praljak – found guilty of committing violations of the laws of war, crimes against humanity, and breaches of the Geneva Conventions
- Tihomir Blaškić – convicted of violating the laws of war, committing ethnic cleansing and crimes against humanity during the Bosnian war
- Hazim Delić – war criminal, convicted of grave breaches of the Geneva Conventions which included the murders, rape, torture, inhuman and cruel treatment of the prisoners
- Rasim Delić – war criminal, convicted of war crimes by the for failing to prevent and punish crimes committed by the El Mujahid unit under his command

== Nobel Prize ==
- Ivo Andrić – literature

== See also ==
- List of Bosniaks
- List of Croats
- List of Serbs
- Demographic history of Bosnia and Herzegovina
