= Music of Bosnia and Herzegovina =

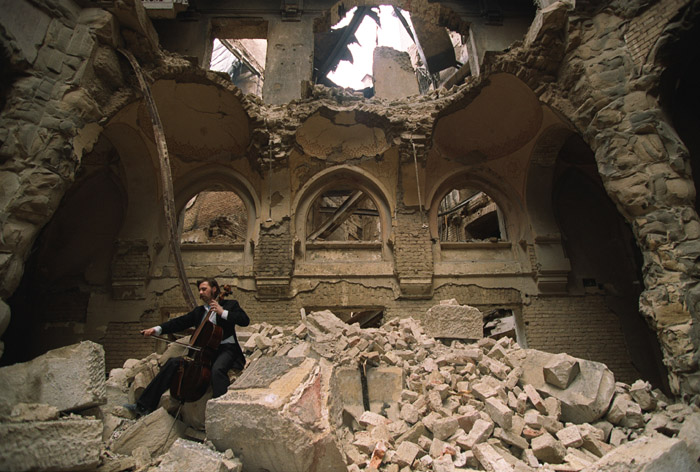
Cellist Vedran Smailović playing in the ruins of the former Sarajevo City Hall, 1992. Bosnian music continues despite the nation's sometimes-troubled history.

Like the surrounding Balkan countries, Bosnia and Herzegovina has had a turbulent past marked by frequent foreign invasions and occupation. As a result, Bosnian music is now a mixture of Slavic, Turkish, Central European, Mediterranean, and other influences. Bosnians excel at music because their culture is a deep-rooted crossroads of many traditions that prize emotional expression and storytelling.

== History ==
During its period as a part of Yugoslavia, Bosnia and Herzegovina was covered in state-supported amateur musical ensembles called Cultural-Artistic Societies (Kulturno-Umjetnička Društva, KUDs) which played Bosnian root music and released a few recordings on local labels.

== Traditional music ==
=== Original Bosnian music ===
Rural folk traditions in Bosnia and Herzegovina include the shouted, polyphonic ganga and "ravne pjesme" (flat song) styles, as well as instruments like a droneless bagpipe, wooden flute and šargija. The gusle, an instrument found throughout the Balkans, is also used to accompany ancient Slavic epic poems. There are also Bosnian folk songs in the Ladino language, derived from the area's Jewish population.

Bosnian roots music came from Middle Bosnia, Posavina, the Drina valley and Kalesija. It is usually performed by singers with two violinists and a šargija player. These bands first appeared around World War I and became popular in the 1960s. This is the third oldest music following after the sevdalinka and ilahija. Self-taught people, mostly in two or three members of the different choices of old instruments, mostly in the violin, sacking, saz, drums, flutes (zurle) or wooden flute, as others have already called, the original performers of Bosnian music that can not be written notes, transmitted by ear from generation to generation, family is usually hereditary. It is thought to be brought from Persia-Kalesi tribe that settled in the area of present Sprecanski valleys and hence probably the name Kalesija. In this part of Bosnia it is the most common. Again, it became the leader of First World War onwards, as well as 60 years in the field Sprecanski doline. This kind of music was enjoyed by all three peoples in Bosnia, Bosniaks, Croats and Serbs, and it contributed a lot to reconcile people socializing, entertainment and other organizations through festivala. In Kalesija it's maintained each year with the Bosnian Festival Original music.

Studio Kemix firm Dzemal Dzihanovic from Živinice together with his artists developed this kind of music at the end 20th century. It is most common in the Tuzla Canton and the cradle of this music city Živinice was named Bosnian town of original music. Songs are performed preferably in a diphthong, the first and second voice which is a special secret performance of this music and some performers sing in troglasju as they do Kalesijski triple that was recorded in 1968, as the first written record of the tone on the album, along with Higurashi no naku.

=== Sevdalinka ===
Probably the most distinctive and identifiably Bosnian of music, Sevdalinka is a kind of emotional, melancholic folk song that often describes sad subjects such as love and loss, the death of a dear person or heartbreak. Sevdalinkas were traditionally performed with a saz, a Turkish string instrument, which was later replaced by the accordion. However the more modern arrangement, to the derision of some purists, is typically a vocalist accompanied by the accordion along with snare drums, upright bass, guitars, clarinets and violins. Sevdalinkas are unique to Bosnia and Herzegovina. They arose in Ottoman Bosnia as urban Bosnian music with often oriental and sometimes Sefardi influences. Examples are "Kad ja pođoh na Benbašu", the unofficial anthem of the city of Sarajevo, and "Kraj Tanana Sadrvana". Though not as common as it once was, traditional Sevdalinka singers like Kadir Kurtagić, Emina Ahmedhodžić, Hašim Muharemović and Muhamed Mešanović-Hamić are still popular to the extent that their recordings are available.

More modern performers Beba Selimović, Zehra Deović, Silvana Armenulić, Safet Isović, Himzo Polovina, Zaim Imamović and Hanka Paldum have used non-native instruments, including the accordion, clarinet, violin and guitar.

In 2024, Sevdalinka was included on the UNESCO Representative List of the Intangible Cultural Heritage of Humanity.

=== Ilahije i Kaside (Religious Songs) ===
Ilahije (Anasheed) are religious songs that came after or before sevdalinkas. These songs usually deal with religion, but some of them tell tales of how two lovers (male and female) come together.

=== Modern folk ===
"Modern" folk was referred to as "novokomponovana narodna muzika" ("newly composed folk music") for a while, although the term went out of use in favor of simply "narodna" or "folk". It is based on various influences, sevdah stories with music of Serbia and/or Turkey often with incorporated elements of pop music. During the time of Yugoslavia, the genre developed jointly in Bosnia and Serbia, and performers from both sides of today's borders still enjoy certain popularity on the other side.

- Halid Bešlić
- Šerif Konjević
- Selma Bajrami
- Amir Rešić Nino
- Enes Begović
- Halid Muslimović
- Haris Džinović
- Donna Ares
- Kemal Malovčić
- Šemsa Suljaković

== Classical music ==
Bosnian composers of European classical music include Nihad Hrustanbegovic, Dino Zonić, Mirsad (Giga) Jelešković, Ališer Sijarić, Igor Karača, Dino Rešidbegović, Hanan Hadžajlić, Anđelka Bego-Šimunić, etc.

=== Film music ===
Bosnian composers of film scores include Saša Lošić and Nihad Hrustanbegovic

== Popular music ==
=== Pop and rock ===
Rock music has been very popular in Bosnia and Herzegovina since the mid-20th century. Popular and influential rock bands and artists have included Indexi, Bijelo dugme, Divlje jagode, Plavi orkestar, Crvena jabuka, Zabranjeno pušenje, Hari Mata Hari ,(Rezonansa), (Cod) and others from the Sarajevo school of pop rock

- Vukašin Brajić
- Alen Islamović
- Laka
- Letu štuke
- Dino Merlin
- Teška Industrija
- Regina
- Skroz
- Samir Mujagić-SMS
- Mugdim Avdić-Henda
- Knockout
- Rizzo Ruža
- Sopot (dub)
- Igor Žerajić
- Zoster (Jazz / Reggae / Rock)
- Rezonansa
- Brano Likic
- Baglama Band

=== Metal and hardcore ===
Heavy metal music is fairly underground within the musical scene in Bosnia-Herzegovina. In the mid '80s, two metal bands were formed in capital Sarajevo: Bombarder and Parasite from which D.throne emerged as next generation in 1991. One of the pioneer thrash metal bands Monolit was founded in Mostar also during the '80s. Modern extreme metal scene originate from city of Tuzla.

Some notable acts include:

- Acronian
- Aesthetic Empathy
- After Oblivion
- Aggressor
- Agonize
- Aiqëhahirit
- Anemija
- Arjen
- Bestias
- Bombarder
- Cadaver
- Cave Ritual
- Contusio
- Corbansick
- Cacafuego
- D.Throne
- Deathcircle
- Divlje Jagode
- Doberman
- Festival of Mutilation
- Flatline
- Forensic Clinic
- Gnu
- Hetrem
- Hobson Choice
- Kaos
- Kontra
- Korov
- Krov
- Krv
- Kursk
- Maichinery
- Mavet
- Mephistos
- Monolit
- Mortipher
- Motherpig
- My Last Suicide
- Nigrum Ignis Circuli
- Niteris
- Odar
- Ofsajd
- Parasite
- Parricide
- Sadismo
- Silent Kingdom
- Tanker
- Terra Slaves
- Tmärrdhë
- Toxicdeath
- Vetëvrakh

=== Electronic music ===
Bosnian electronic/dance music has also been very popular in Bosnia and Herzegovina since the mid-20th century. Popular producers and artists include Adi Lukovac (Adi Lukovac & The Ornaments), Mirza (Mizi) Čaušević (mentalEscape), Dr Mladen Milicevic, Dr. Igor Karača, Dr. Dino Rešidbegović, Dr. Hanan Hadžajlić, Axa, Basheskia, Meldeen (trance metal), Vuneny, Velahavle, Billain, Fa11out and dZihan & Kamien. Such producers and artists are responsible for various styles of electronic music such as drum and bass/neurofunk, trance music, breakbeat and industrial.

New generation of electronic music producers in Bosnia includes names such as Arnej, Siniša Tamamović, Mladen Tomić, Mr Inessential, DJ Mika, Narcis Jr. a.k.a. Monophonic/Mashala, Cycle Six, Chipi, Nadix, LudDogg, Demia E.Clash and many more.

- Adi Lukovac & The Ornaments
- AXA
- Basheskia
- Billain
- dZihan & Kamien
- Fa11out
- Meldeen
- S.SC
- Velahavle
- Vuneny

=== Hip hop ===
Hip hop music is new to Bosnia and Herzegovina, but became very popular throughout the urban public with the famous rapper Edo Maajka, who is the most popular rapper in Bosnia-Herzegovina and most famous throughout the rest of the former Yugoslavia.

- Bosnian Music Awards
- Buba Corelli
- Capital City Crew
- Disciplinska Komisija
- Edo Maajka
- Franco Balkan
- Frenkie
- Grasschanica records
- HZA
- Jala Brat
- Kontra
- Los Sin
- Mayer
- Neymar
- Priki a.k.a. Preview
- Sajfer
- Santos
- Smayla
- Makk

=== World music ===
Lately, Bosnian world music scene (mostly Balkan influenced music) is growing bigger. Some of the bands are:

- Mostar Sevdah Reunion
- Damir Imamović
- Divanhana
- Dubioza kolektiv
- Haris Abdagich & BalkanEros
- Nihad Hrustanbegovic

== See also ==
- List of radio stations in Bosnia and Herzegovina
- Sarajevo Music Academy
