= Fa11out =

Audio-visual group

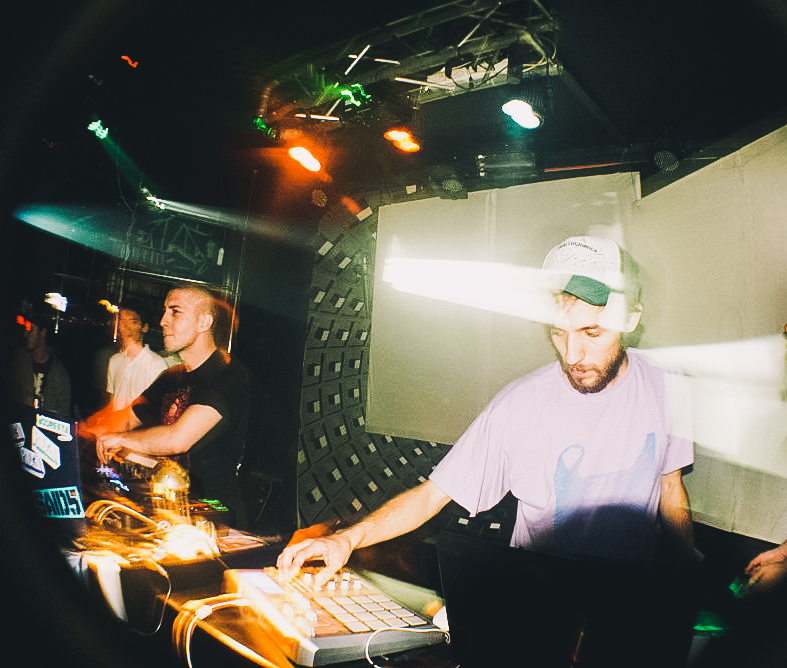
- Fa11out live performance in 2009.

Background information
- Also known as: Phage
- Origin: Tuzla, Bosnia and Herzegovina
- Genres: Drum and bass
- Occupations: Record producers, Musicians, Visual Performers
- Years active: 2007–2019
- Labels: Cause 4 Concern Bad Taste Recordings
- Members: Irfan Brkovic; Senad Nurkanović

Fa11out are an audio visual group from Tuzla, Bosnia and Herzegovina formed in 2007 and consisting of Senad Nurkanović a.k.a. Phage and Irfan Brkovic. Their performance consists of live visuals and progressive drum and bass music. Fa11out have released music on Cause 4 Concern and Bad Taste Recordings from UK.

== Early life ==
Senad and Irfan met at college in 2007 and quickly bonded over their passion for skateboarding and listening to music. Irfan performed visuals with FMJAM while Senad was playing guitar in a metal band Toxicdeath and produced drum and bass. Together they founded Fa11out and continue to organise music events in order to promote drum and bass culture.

== Career ==
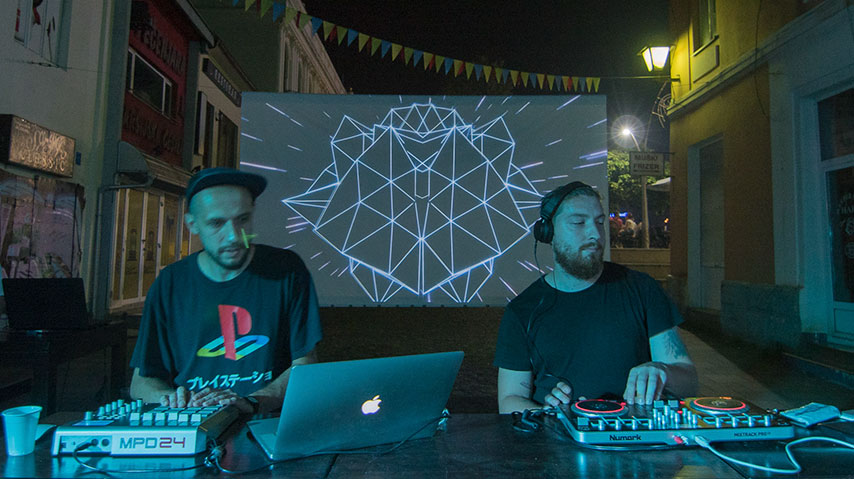
Fa11out at Art Distrikt 2018.

The group collaborate with Optiv, BTK, CZA, Cause 4 Concern, Vegas BCUK & Bad Company UK on graphics, music videos and new music releases. They are close collaborators with Drop Sensei from Serbia with a collective goal to popularize drum and bass in Balkan region. In 2017 Senad opened Skinlab tattoo studio in his hometown Tuzla along with DJ Optiv performance. During 2018 they founded Art Distrikt a DIY space dedicated to visual arts, graffiti and music in one of the oldest street in Tuzla. They performed at the EXIT 2019 with Chase & Status and Dub FX for UKF 10th anniversary.

== Discography ==
- Trinity EP (2013)
- Black Bones (2017)
- Necronaks (2018)
