= Šabanović =

Šabanović is a surname. Notable people with the surname include:

- Arnela Šabanović (born 1991), Bosnian-Herzegovinian footballer
- Halid Šabanović (born 1999), Bosnian footballer
- Hazim Šabanović (1916–1971), Bosniak and Yugoslav historian
- Samel Šabanović (born 1983), Montenegrin footballer
