= Mašići Rebellion (1806) =

1806 rebellion

- Part of First Serbian Uprising
| Date | After 15 august 1806 (short-lived) |
| Location | Gradiška, Bosnia Eyalet (modern Bosnia and Herzegovina) |
| Result | Ottoman victory |

Belligerents
| Local Serb peasants | Ottoman Bosnian troops |

Commanders and leaders
| Mašići knez (executed); Mašići Orthodox priest (executed) | Unknown |

Casualties and losses
| Rebels killed in battle or captured alive and executed | Unknown |

The Mašići Rebellion (Serbian: машићка буна) was a Serb rebellion against the Ottoman authorities in the Bosanska Krajina region that broke out in 1806 in the Mašići village near Gradiška.

The Ottoman authorities followed the behaviour of Serbs of Bosnia and Herzegovina during the First Serbian Uprising led by Karađorđe, in order to prevent a connection to the Serbian uprising. After learning that a number of local Serbs crossed to join the rebellion, Ali-paša Vidajić of Zvornik burnt down the Orthodox Tavna Monastery and many villages in its surroundings. In 1806 Karađorđe sent confidants to rise up northern Bosnia. The Serbian victory at Mišar (13–15 August 1806), in which 12,000 rebels defeated 20,000 troops of Bosnian beys, raised hopes among the Serbs of Bosanska Krajina, and resonated among Bosnia's Christians who due to it took up a defensive stance against Muslim abuse. Prijedor priest Dimitrije Stojanović wrote "as all Orthodox we hope that Karađorđe also liberates and puts us under his leadership". Karađorđe's confidants were unable to rise up the region at this time, due to the state of poverty in the villages. Only Mašići, the most well of the villages situated below the Kozara mountain, and its immediate surroundings, rose up. This area had a favourable geographic location with the Kozara and Sava river, in case the rebellion failed.

The first Mašići rebellious movement was suppressed by the Ottoman troops who had returned home after their defeat at Mišar. Half of the 1,000 soldiers sent by the aghas and beys of Bosanska Krajina survived Mišar and returned home. The Banja Luka "Turks" had received news that Mašići revolted and informed the troops coming through, who then hurried to clash with them. The Ottoman troops intercepted rebel bands at the Lijevče field, who were untrained and badly armed. Part of the rebels were killed, others took refuge on the Kozara from where they crossed the Sava into Habsburg territory, while some were captured alive. 18 or 17 of the captured Serbs were impaled in the Banja Luka field and died in agony with Ottoman guards surrounding them. Among these were the Mašići priest and knez (Christian village mayor). Part of the refugees took to Nova Gradiška in Habsburg territory (now in Croatia).

The Mašići rebellion of 1806 is sometimes confused with the 1809 Jančić's rebellion (which is also called the "First Mašići rebellion").

== Sources ==
- Antić, Čedomir; Kecmanović, Nenad (2016). Историја Републике Српске. pp. 91, 517.
- Bataković, Dušan T. (2006). "A Balkan-Style French Revolution? The 1804 Serbian Uprising in European Perspective". Balcanica. XXXVI. Belgrade: Балканолошки институт – via Balcanica.
- Bijelić, Stojan (7 May 1933). "Машићка буна". Врбаске новине (107). Banja Luka: Kralj. banska uprava Vrbaske banovine: 5.
- Čubrilović, Vasa (1939). Prvi srpski ustanak i bosanski Srbi. Geca Kon.
- Čubrilović, Vasa (1934). "Револуционарни покрети у Босанској Крајини у XIX веку". Гласник Југословенског професорског друштва. XIV (10─12): 902─910.
- Ekmečić, Milorad (2008). Дуго кретања између клања и орања: Историја Срба у Новом веку (1492-1992) (PDF). Belgrade: Завод за уџбенике.
- Milošević, Borivoje (2016). "Српско свештенство и ослободилачки покрети Срба у Босни у посљедњем вијеку турске управе" (PDF). Међународни научни скуп историчара Херцеговачки устанак 1875-1878. Gacko: 113–134.
- Stojančević, V. "Србија и ослобођење Босне у време Првог српског устанка". Српски народ у својој новијој историји, крај XVII–почетак XX века. Novi Sad.
