= Mašići =

Mašići Машићи
- Village
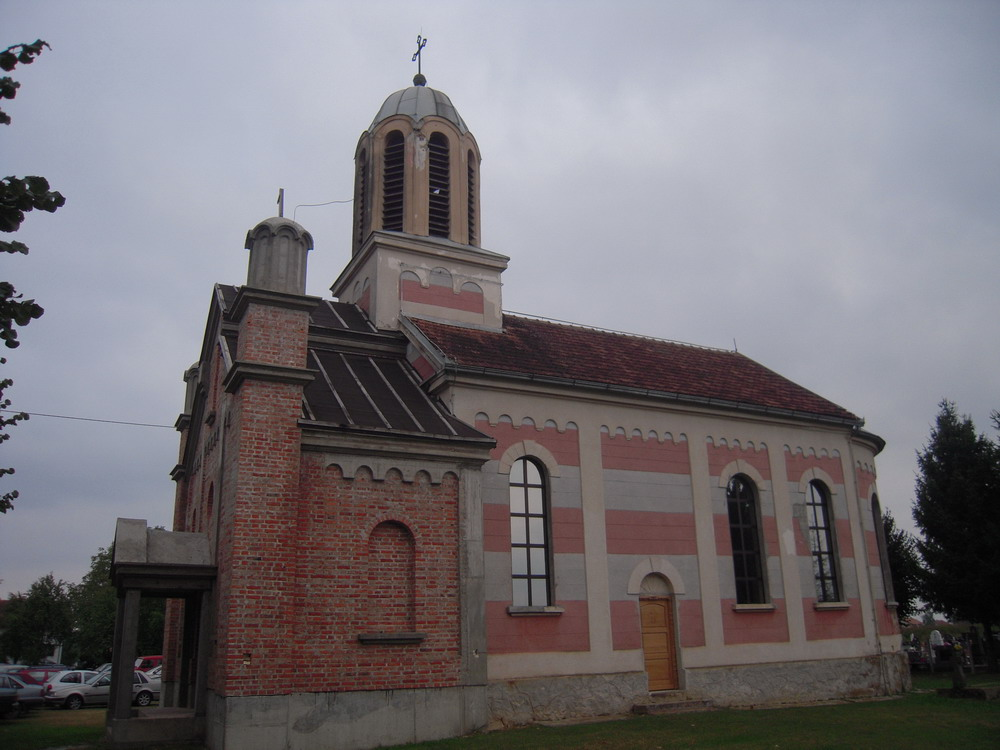
- A Serbian Orthodox church in Mašići

- Location within Bosnia and Herzegovina
- Coordinates: 45°00′57″N 17°15′29″E
- Country: Bosnia and Herzegovina
- Entity: Republika Srpska
- Municipality: Gradiška
- Time zone: UTC+1 (CET)
  - Summer (DST): UTC+2 (CEST)

Mašići (Serbian Cyrillic: Машићи) is a village in the municipality of Gradiška, Republika Srpska, Bosnia and Herzegovina.

The village was the starting site of the Mašići Rebellion (1806), Jančić's Revolt (1809) and the Second Mašići Rebellion (1834).
