= Senjamin Burić =

Bosnian handball player

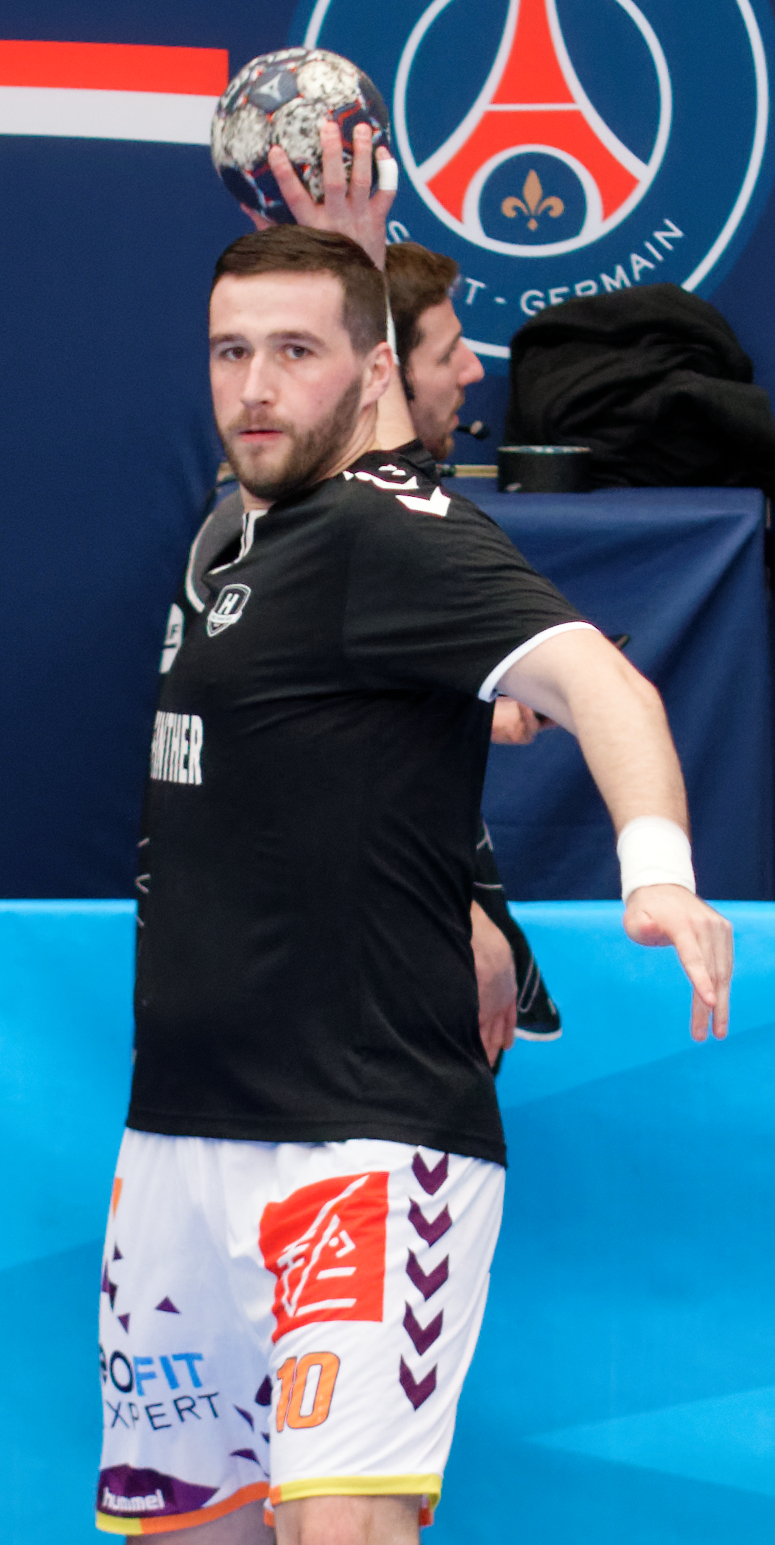

Personal information
- Nationality: Bosnian
- Born: 20 November 1990 (age 35) Doboj, SR Bosnia and Herzegovina, Yugoslavia
- Height: 1.98 m (6 ft 6 in)

Sport
- Sport: Handball
- Position: Pivot
- Current club: Skjern Håndbold
- Number: 7

Senior clubs
- Years: Team
- –: RK Maglaj
- 2010–2013: HRK Izviđač
- 2013: RK Borac m:tel
- 2013–2016: RK Gorenje Velenje
- 2016–2018: HBC Nantes
- 2018–2019: RK Zagreb
- 2019–2020: HBC Nantes
- 2020–2021: RK Zagreb
- 2021–: Skjern Håndbold
National team
Years	Team	Apps	(Gls)
2010–2025	Bosnia and Herzegovina	74	(172)

Senjamin Burić (born 20 November 1990) is a Bosnian professional handball player who plays for Skjern Håndbold.

He is the twin brother of Benjamin Burić.
