= Bosnia and Herzegovina men's national handball team =

Bosnia and Herzegovina

Information
- Nickname: Zmajevi (Dragons)
- Association: Handball Federation of Bosnia and Herzegovina
- Coach: Damir Doborac
- Most caps: Mirsad Terzić (173)
- Most goals: Mirsad Terzić (473)

Colours
1st	2nd

Results

World Championship
- Appearances: 1 (First in 2015)
- Best result: 20th (2015)

European Championship
- Appearances: 3 (First in 2020)
- Best result: 23rd (2020, 2022)
- Last updated on Unknown.

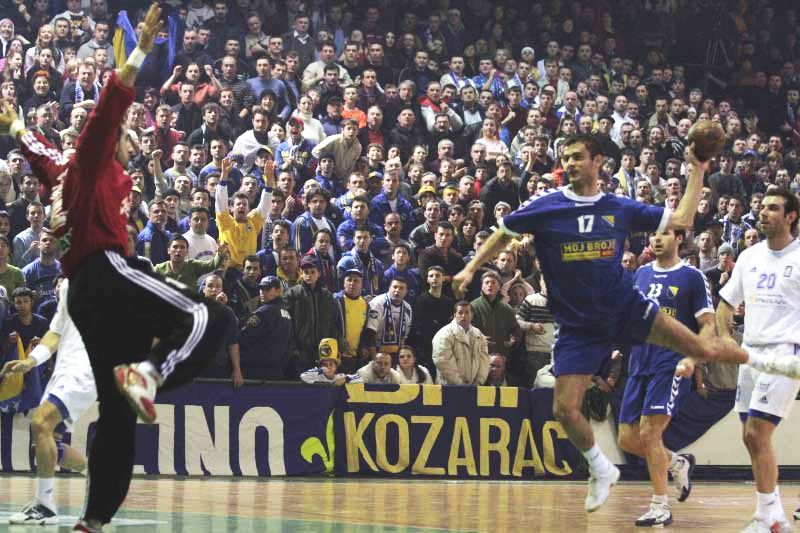
19 January 2006: Bosnia v Greece 29–27

The Bosnia and Herzegovina national handball team represented Bosnia and Herzegovina in international handball matches from 1992 to 2025, when its governing body, the Handball Federation of Bosnia and Herzegovina became defunct.

== Competitive record ==
=== World Championship ===
World Championship record
Year	Round	Position	GP	W	D	L	GS	GA
(Sweden) 1993	Did not qualify							
(Iceland) 1995	Did not qualify							
(Japan) 1997	Did not qualify							
(Egypt) 1999	Did not qualify							
(France) 2001	Did not qualify							
(Portugal) 2003	Did not qualify							
(Tunisia) 2005	Did not qualify							
(Germany) 2007	Did not qualify							
(Croatia) 2009	Did not qualify							
(Sweden) 2011	Did not qualify							
(Spain) 2013	Did not qualify							
(Qatar) 2015	Preliminary round	20	5	1	0	4	118	128
(France) 2017	Did not qualify							
(Denmark) / (Germany) 2019	Did not qualify							
(Egypt) 2021	Did not qualify							
(Poland) (Sweden) 2023	Did not qualify							
(Croatia) (Denmark) (Norway) 2025	Did not qualify							
(Germany) 2027	Did not qualify							
(France) (Germany) 2029	To be determined							
(Denmark) (Iceland) (Norway) 2031	To be determined							
Total	1/22	–	5	1	0	4	118	128

=== European Championship ===
European Championship record
Year	Round	Position	GP	W	D	L	GF	GA
(Portugal) 1994	Did not qualify							
(Spain) 1996	Did not qualify							
(Italy) 1998	Did not qualify							
(Croatia) 2000	Did not qualify							
(Sweden) 2002	Did not qualify							
(Slovenia) 2004	Did not qualify							
(Switzerland) 2006	Did not qualify							
(Norway) 2008	Did not qualify							
(Austria) 2010	Did not qualify							
(Serbia) 2012	Did not qualify							
(Denmark) 2014	Did not qualify							
(Poland) 2016	Did not qualify							
(Croatia) 2018	Did not qualify							
(Austria) / (Norway) / (Sweden) 2020	Preliminary round	23	3	0	0	3	73	90
(Hungary) (Slovakia) 2022	Preliminary round	23	3	0	0	3	61	85
(Germany) 2024	Preliminary round	24	3	0	0	3	59	87
(Denmark) (Norway) (Sweden) 2026	Did not qualify							
(Portugal) (Spain) (Switzerland) 2028	To be determined							
(Czech Republic) (Denmark) (Poland) 2030	To be determined							
(France) (Germany) 2032	To be determined							
Total	3/20	–	9	0	0	9	193	262

== Team ==
=== Current squad ===
Squad for the 2024 European Men's Handball Championship.

No.	Pos.	Name	Date of birth (age)	Height	App.	Goals	Club
5	LB	Mirko Herceg	26 February 1992 (age 34)	1.95 m	20	40	(Hungary) Csurgói KK
8	P	Senjamin Burić	20 November 1990 (age 35)	1.98 m	84	197	(Denmark) Skjern Håndbold
9	LW	Adi Mehmedćehajić	20 June 2001 (age 25)	1.91 m	11	10	(Bosnia and Herzegovina) RK Gračanica
10	RB	Marko Panić	10 March 1991 (age 35)	1.97 m	72	184	(France) Montpellier Handball
12	GK	Benjamin Burić	20 November 1990 (age 35)	1.96 m	81	5	(Germany) SG Flensburg-Handewitt
14	CB	Mirsad Terzić	12 July 1983 (age 43)	1.96 m	172	460	(Poland) Orlen Wisła Płock
15	P	Adin Faljić	24 September 2000 (age 26)	1.97 m	9	4	(Croatia) RK Zagreb
16	GK	Admir Ahmetašević	5 June 1994 (age 32)	1.95 m	15	0	(Switzerland) Pfadi Winterthur
17	RW	Luka Perić	13 March 2003 (age 23)	1.95 m	13	24	(Slovenia) Celje Pivovarna Laško
20	LB	Luka Knežević	11 February 2000 (age 26)	1.95 m	5	7	(Bosnia and Herzegovina) RK Sloboda Tuzla
21	RB	Nedim Hadžić	22 March 2000 (age 26)	1.89 m	5	1	(Bosnia and Herzegovina) RK Borac Banja Luka
23	LB	Dino Hamidović	11 July 1996 (age 30)	1.95 m	17	33	(Bosnia and Herzegovina) RK Gračanica
26	LB	Igor Mandić	16 October 1991 (age 34)	1.96 m	18	3	(France) Sélestat Alsace Handball
34	CB	Marko Davidović	27 August 1992 (age 34)	1.88 m	12	23	(Slovakia) HT Tatran Prešov
35	LW	Marko Majstorović	24 September 2001 (age 25)	1.87 m	4	0	(Slovenia) MRK Krka
36	RW	Vladan Đurđević	8 October 1996 (age 29)	1.86 m	3	6	(Bosnia and Herzegovina) RK Sloga Doboj
40	GK	Harun Hodžić	7 June 2000 (age 26)	1.95 m	2	0	(France) Chambéry Savoie MHB
80	P	Amir Muhović	2 December 1999 (age 26)	2.04 m	9	7	(Bosnia and Herzegovina) RK Bosna Sarajevo

=== Coaching history ===
- Senad Fetahagić (21 June 1993 – 1999)
- Sead Hasanefendić (2 June 2000 – 24 September 2002)
- Abaz Arslanagić (24 September 2002 – 23 October 2003)
- Jasmin Mrkonja (23 October 2003 – 2 July 2004)
- Kasim Kamenica (2 July 2004 – 9 November 2005)
- Vojislav Rađa (9 November 2005 – 20 April 2006)
- Halid Demirović (6 October 2006 – 31 August 2009)
- Vojislav Rađa (8 September 2009 – 21 June 2011)
- Dragan Marković (26 October 2011 – 16 June 2016)
- Bilal Šuman (20 August 2016 – 17 February 2021)
- Ivica Obrvan (17 February 2021 – 11 March 2022)
- Toni Čolina (14 March 2022 – 30 September 2022)
- Irfan Smajlagić (30 September 2022 – 26 February 2024)
- Damir Doborac (8 April 2024 – present)

=== Player statistics ===
Most appearances
Player	NT Career	Position	Games
Mirsad Terzić	2001–2024	OB	173
Muhamed Toromanović	2003–2020	P	137
Nikola Prce	2006–2022	OB	119
Enid Tahirović	2000–2012	GK	100
Damir Doborac	2000–2012		98
Nebojša Grahovac	2006-2020.	GK	85
Vukašin Stojanović	2005–2012		83
Senjamin Burić	2010–2025	P	77
Adnan Šabanović	1999–2012		77
Benjamin Burić	2009–2025	GK	75

Top scorers
Player	NT Career	Position	Average	Goals
Mirsad Terzić	2001–2024	OB	3.12	473
Nikola Prce	2006–2022	OB	3.73	444
Muhamed Toromanović	2003–2020	OB	3.36	425
Damir Doborac	2000–2012		3.43	336
Vukašin Stojanović	2005–2012		3.95	328
Edhem Sirčo			3.00	225
Adnan Jaškić	2004–2011		3.44	196
Adnan Harmandić	2002–2012		2.50	185
Senjamin Burić	2010–2025	P	2.26	174
Senjanin Maglajlija	1996–		3.55	167

== Kit ==
Period	Supplier	Sponsor
2012–2015	(Germany) Kempa	BH Telecom
2015–2016	(Bosnia and Herzegovina) Haad	BH Telecom
2016–2018	(Denmark) H2O	BH Telecom
2018–present	(Bosnia and Herzegovina) No1	BH Telecom
