= Flairck =

Dutch music group

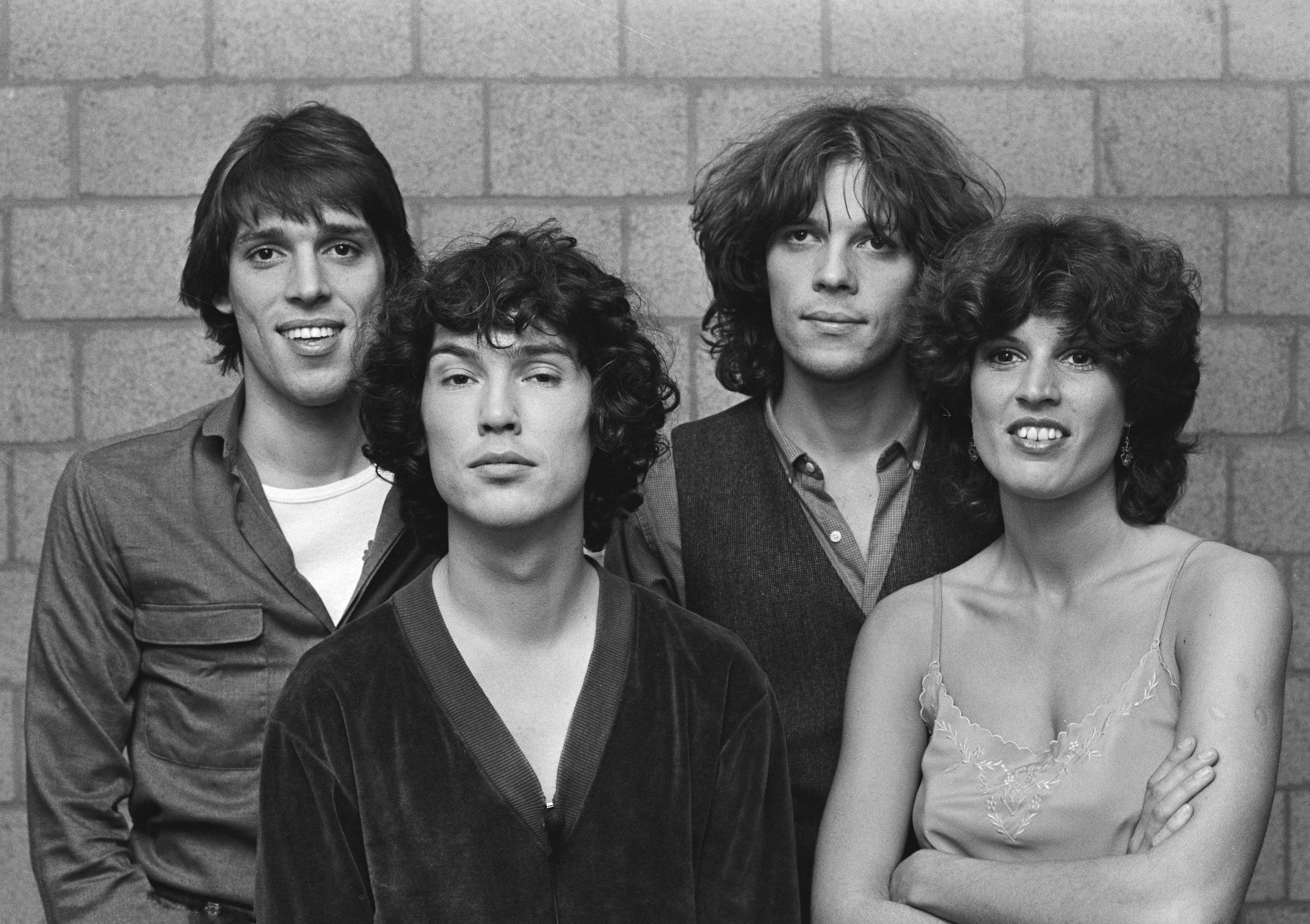
- Flairck in 1980

Background information
- Origin: Netherlands
- Genres: Chamber music; Folk music; Jazz; Classical music
- Years active: 1978-2022
- Labels: Polydor; EMI; Cosmic; Cloud; IMC; Koch International; D&K; Bonnet Records; Homerecords.be
- Past members: Erik Visser; Peter Weekers; Anne van den Heuvel; Annet Visser; Antoinette Lohmann; Ben van den Berg; Carla Veen; Cora den Haring; Cornee van der Kleij; Dirk van Gorp; Elaina Cook; Eric Vaarzon Morel; Hans Visser; Jens Loh; Judith Sijp; Judy Schomper; Liesbeth Lambrecht; Lorre Lynn Trytten; Luluk Purwanto; Marieke van der Heyden; Mariëlle Nieuwenhuis; Marius Preda; Mart Flecijn; Michel Grens; Mirella Pirskanen; Natalia Rogalski; Nihad Hrustanbegovic; Robert Baba; Roelof Rosendal; Stan Stolk; Sylvia Houtzager; Ted de Jong; Thomas Dirks; Timothy Brandsen; Pablo Ortiz; Zhazira Ukeyeva; Jeroen Goossens; Anouk Sanczuk; Joris Vanvinckenroye
- Website: www.flairck.com/en

Flairck was a Dutch musical ensemble formed in 1978 by guitar virtuoso Erik Visser. and multi-instrumentalist Peter Weekers. The group had varying members, depending on the project. Their musical style was a blend of folk music, jazz and classical chamber music, with touches of blues. The music written by the members of the ensemble was often centred on an album theme and was played with a wide variety of acoustic instruments.

The name of the band was derived from the French word flair and the Dutch word vlerk, which means 'a nimble fingered hand' or 'wing', but also 'rowdy young man'.

== History ==
Flairck started as an instrumental group, playing acoustic instruments and composing the majority of its own material. They play a form of chamber music, classically influenced new "traditional" music.

The group played in many countries, including Indonesia, Japan, Australia, and North and South America. The group toured France with Georges Moustaki and recorded an album with producer Mike Batt and singer Maggie Reilly (Sleight of Hand, EMI).

After two years of preparation Flairck released its first album in 1978. Variations on a Lady went platinum in the Netherlands and received three awards, including an Edison. The second album, The Lady's Back (1979), went gold and received several distinctions including an Edison. Over the years Flairck has released 17 albums. The third album, Live in Amsterdam, was released in 1980, Circus in 1981, Flairck and Orchestra and Moustaki and Flairck in 1982, Bal Masque in 1984, Sleight of Hand in 1985, Encore in 1986 and The Emigrant in 1988. In February 1989 (for 1988) Flairck received the Gouden Harp (Golden Harp).

Alive, a live double CD, was released in 1990. The Parade (1992) was based on the paintings of the Dutch medieval painter Hieronymus Bosch and the CD Chambers (1994) on the work of the Belgian surrealist René Magritte. In 1995 the CD The Chilean Concerts was recorded and released in South America. The Golden Age (1996) was set in the 17th century and based on the true story of the VOC sailing ship Batavia. In 1997 the group spent three months in Chile composing and recording music for the photographer Roberto Edwards' project "Cuerpos Pintados". In 1998 the tour "Lijf" celebrated the 20th anniversary of Flairck. In 1999 the Symphony for the Old World incorporated 9 musicians, including 4 soloists from the four corners of Europe. The CD and video Symphony for the Old World were released in 2000.

"Circus Hieronymus Bosch", a cooperation with acrobatics theatre group 'Corpus' and based on the paintings of the Dutch mediaeval painter Hieronymus Bosch, premiered in 2001, in Den Bosch, followed by more than 80 concerts in the Netherlands and Belgium. Circus Hieronymus Bosch was recorded as a DVD and released in 2002.

Because of the success of this unusual circus show the cooperation between Flairck and Corpus continued the following year, resulting in the opera Lucia the Moucheron, which premiered on 21 September 2002 in Middelburg.

In 2003 and 2004 Flairck stopped touring for the first time in its 25-year history. Erik Visser took the time to polish some old scores: together with editor Piet Zweers he prepared the final musical scores of Symphony for the Old World, Circus Hieronymus Bosch and Lucia de Moucheron. Flairck released these music books online.

In 2004 and 2005 Erik Visser worked on a solo tour called "The One Man Parade" traveling through 45 Dutch theaters.

In January 2014 Flairck returned to Chile to lead World Music Festival 2014 (Festival de Músicas del Mundo 2014), performing in Santiago, Viña del Mar and Concepción.

In 2017, Pablo Ortiz teamed up with new musicians to form the next generation of Flairck. The new line-up started to present new compositions while empowering Flairck’s characteristic acoustic sound.

In 2020, hindered by the global pandemic, Flairck started a crowdfunding campaign for their new album. More than 60 people pitched in and Flairck released their first new album in years, Back Alive.

In October 2022, the newest line-up announced that they would no longer be performing under the name "Flairck" and instead would be performing under the name Motyk.

== Discography ==
=== Studio ===
- 1978 - Variaties op een Dame (Variations on a Lady)
- 1980 - Gevecht met de Engel (The Lady's Back)
- 1981 - Circus
- 1982 - Flairck & Orkest
- 1982 - Moustaki & Flairck
- 1984 - Bal Masqué
- 1986 - Sleight of Hand
- 1989 - Flairck 10 (The Emigrant)
- 1992 - De Optocht (The Parade)
- 1994 - Kamers (Chambers)
- 1996 - De Gouden Eeuw (The Golden Age)
- 1998 - Cuerpos Tocados: Music for the Body

=== Live ===
- 1980 – Live in Amsterdam
- 1985 – Encore
- 1990 – Alive
- 1995 – En Vivo en Chile (The Chilean Concerts)
- 2000 - Symphony for the Old World
- 2011 - Global Orchestra (Flairck & Basily)
- 2014 - The Lady's Back

=== Compilations ===
- 1992 - The Very Best of Flairck
- 1998 – 3 Originals (the first 3 studio albums remastered)
- 2007 – Twee en Twintig (Twenty Two) (22 CD oeuvre box set)

=== Video ===
- 2002 - Circus Hiëronymus Bosch (Flairck & Corpus)
- 2011 - Global Orchestra (Flairck & Basily)
- 2014 - The Lady's Back

=== Solo ===
- 2004 – Erik Visser: Eenmansoptocht (One Man Parade)
