= Nesim Tahirović =

Bosnian artist (1941–2020)

- Born: 23 October 1941; Tuzla, Bosnia and Herzegovina
- Died: 14 August 2020 (aged 78); Tuzla, Bosnia and Herzegovina
- Education: Fakultet Likovnih Umetnosti, Belgrade
- Known for: Painting, Drawing, Sculpture

Nesim Tahirović (23 October 1941 – 14 August 2020) was a Bosnian painter. He studied art (painting) in Belgrade under professor Kosta Hakman.

Along with painting he also worked in the area of scenic design and other applied arts. During a forty five-year career as an independent artist he had around sixty solo exhibitions and more than hundred group exhibitions in his native country and abroad where he also received numerous awards for both painting and scenic design. His paintings were exhibited in museums, galleries and sold to private collectors all over the world. He was a member of The Association of Applied Artists and Designers of Bosnia and Herzegovina (ULUPUBiH) and Association of Visual Artists of Bosnia and Herzegovina (ULUBiH). He lived and worked in Tuzla as an independent artist .

== Solo exhibitions ==
- 1963 – Tuzla
- 1964 – Tuzla
- 1966 – Osijek
- 1967 – Osijek
- 1975 – Osijek, Sarajevo
- 1976 – Portorož
- 1977 – Trieste
- 1978 – Lignano
- 1979 – Graz, Trieste, Graz
- 1981 – Tuzla, Tuzla
- 1983 – Tuzla
- 1987 – Novi Sad
- 1988 – Belgrade, Tuzla
- 1989 – Warszawa, Płock, Sierpc, Olsztyn
- 1990 – Toruń, Frombork, Ratingen
- 1991 – Ratingen, Ratingen, Bolesławiec, Zgorzelec
- 1992 – Braniewo, Płock, Ratingen, München, Ratzeburg, Ratingen, Grevenbroich
- 1993 – Coesfeld, Hilden, Müllheim an der Ruhr, Velbert, Ronchi dei Legionari
- 1994 – Sarajevo, Duisburg, Wetzlar, Essen, Ratingen, Leverkusen
- 1995 – Biberach, Göttingen, Zenica, Leipzig
- 1996 – Tuzla, Bosnia and Herzegovina
- 1999 – Osijek, Zagreb
- 2000 – Issum
- 2001 – Bihać
- 2002 – Novi Sad
- 2003 – Subotica
- 2005 – Brčko
- 2007 – Jajce
- 2010 – Sarajevo
