= Florijan Mićković =

Bosnian Croat sculptor (1935–2021)

- Born: Florijan Vladimir Mićković; 26 April 1935; Mostar, Kingdom of Yugoslavia
- Died: 19 February 2021 (aged 85); Mostar, Bosnia and Herzegovina
- Education: Academy of Fine Arts, Zagreb
- Known for: Sculpture, painting, drawing

Florijan Mićković (26 April 1935 – 19 February 2021) was a Bosnian Croat sculptor living and working in Mostar and Međugorje.

== Life and work ==
Florijan Mićković was born in Mostar in 1935. He graduated from University of Zagreb Academy of Fine Arts in 1962, in the class of Antun Augustinčić. He has been member of the Croatian Fine Arts Association since 1963, Bosnian-Herzegovinian Fine Arts Association and is one of the founding members of the HAZU BIH. He lives and works as an independent artist in Mostar. Mićković exhibited in most European countries, Africa, the United States and Canada.

In the 1990s his work was slowed down due to war. In addition he lost his studio, together with the pieces he had been collecting for his major one-man-show. Today fragments of his artistic production can be reconstructed by means of scarce, often damaged documentation, but postwar activity has enabled Mićković to fill in the void in his work following the wartime losses, and to search for new opportunities, to experiment.

Mićković died in Mostar on 19 February 2021, at the age of 85.

== Exhibitions ==
=== One man exhibitions ===
- 1962. Mostar, Klub Javnih Radnika
- 1970. Lignano, Sabbiadoro, Italija
- 1971. Dubrovnik, Galerija Doma Sinkikata
- 1972. Dubrovnik, Galerija Doma Sinkikata
- 1981. Mostar, Umjetnička Galerija
- 1988. Ljubljana, Instiut Josef Stefan
- 1989. Anacortes /USA/, Green Frog Gallery
- 1989. Vancouver, Croatian Cultural Center
- 1989. Calgary, Croatian Cultural Center
- 1990. Vancouver, Art Gallery
- 1990. Vancouver, Horisons 89
- 1992. Chicago, Croatian Cultural Center
- 1992. Zagreb, Galerija Miroslav Kraljević
- 1998. Zagreb, Galerija Forum
- 1999. Široki Brijeg, Fanjevačka Galerija
- 2000. Mostar, Umjetnička Galerija
- 2000. Zadar, Galerija Loža
- 2000. Zagreb, Muzej Mimara
- 2000. Zenica, Galerija Narodni Muzej
- 2002. Sarajevo, Galerija Roman Petrovič
- 2003. Mostar, Centar Za Kulturu
- 2006. Rome, Il Lazio Tra Europa E Mediterraneo
- 2008. Metkovic, City Galerija
- 2008. Split, Galerija Bresan
- 2009, Trebinje, Museum of Herzegovina
- 2010, Banja Luka, Muzej savremene umjetnosti
- 2011, Sarajevo, Collegium artisticum
- 2011, Dubrovnik, Samostan sv. Klare
- 2013, Mostar, "Galerija Aluminij"

=== Sculptures colonies ===
Florijan has taken part in many sculptures colonies; Cazin, Počitelj (BiH), Koprivnica, Slavonski Brod, Medulin (Croatia), Kragujevac (Serbia), Mostar 2004, Mostar (Radobolja) 2005.

=== Awards ===
- 1989. City of Mostar award
- 2000. First award on sculptures «Anale» in Sarajevo
- 2002. Sculpture award / «Collegium artisticum» in Sarajevo
- 2002. «Grand Prix» drawing exhibition in Mostar
- 2008. «Gold Medallion» award for the ULUBIH for an outstanding contribution to the reconstruction of the international art colony in Počitelj.
- 2010. ULUBIH award in recognition of an active and invaluable work with the Association of Artists of Bosnia and Herzegovina, as well as for engagement, development and promotion of cultural values in the Bosnia and Herzegovina.
- 2013. City of Mostar - Order for merits in promoting the culture of the city of Mostar.
- 2015. Peace Center for the multi-ethical cooperation in Mostar - recognize and award Florijan with `Mimar`award for his commitment and outstanding contributions and affirmation of peace in the difficult post-war period in Mostar.

=== Symposiums ===
- 2005. European Symposium Kaisersteinbruch, setting up the stone relief of Bosnia & Herzegovina to the Wall of Unity.

=== Monuments and Public Sculptures ===
- 1978. Imotski (Perića Brijeg), Jure Galić – Veliki Biste Heroja
- 1961. Mostar, Dr. Safet Mujić
- 1961. Mostar, Šefik Obad
- 1961. Mostar, Jusuf Čevro
- 1961. Mostar, Adem Buć
- 1961. Mostar, Ljubo Brešan
- 1961. Robert Bobby Fisher
- 1961. Mostar, Rifat Frenjo
- 1962. Ljubinje, Novica Domazet
- 1980. Mostar, Mladen Balorda i Hasan Zahirović Laca
- 1980. Mostar, Mithat Haćam
- 1985. Mostar, Mustafa Ćemalović – Ćimba
- 1986. Mostar, Karlo Batko
- 1986. Mostar, Salko Pezo
- 1986. Mostar, Zlatka Vuković
- 1965. Lištica, Ljupko Matijević
- 1974. Mostar, Savo Medan
- 1974. Biograd (Nevesinje), Blagoje Parović
- 1986. Posušje, Mostar, Dr. Ante Jamnicki
- 1975. Mostar, Sarajevo, Hamza Humo (Town’s park)
- 1977. Čitluk, Ivan Krndelj
- 1978. Sovići, Džemal Bijedić (Elementary School)
- 1979. Trsteno, Ante Miljas
- 1980. Mostar, Dr. Lovro Dojmi
- 1981. Mostar, Veljko Vlahović (High School)
- 1978. ing. Puba Loose
- 1988. Marko Zovko
- 1990. Mujaga Komadina, first mayor of Mostar
- 2001. Karlo Afan de Rivera, painter
- 2002, Meho Sefić, painter
