= Jančić's rebellion =

Serbo-Ottoman revolutionary conflict, 1809

- Part of Ottoman–Serbian Wars
Date	September 23 – mid – October 1809
Location	Gradiška, Bosnia Eyalet (modern Bosnia and Herzegovina)
Result	Ottoman victory

Belligerents
Local Serb peasants	Ottoman Empire

Commanders and leaders
Jovan Jančić–Sarajlija	Unknown

Strength
Unknown	Unknown

Casualties and losses
Rebel leaders executed	Unknown

Jančić's rebellion (Serbian: Јанчићева буна/Jančićeva buna), also known as the First Mašići rebellion (Прва Машићка буна/Prva Mašićka buna), was a rebellion led by ethnic Serbs in the Gradiška region against the Ottoman government in the Bosnia Eyalet. It broke out in September 1809 following a string of economical, national and religious deprivations of the rights of Serbs.

== Background ==
With the First Serbian Uprising that broke out in the Sanjak of Smederevo in 1804, hajduk actions also began to the west of the Drina, especially after the decisive Serbian victory at the Battle of Mišar (1806). Hajduks also arrived from Serbia, and they were especially active on the Kozara. The work of priest Jovo from Svinjar, priest Nikodim from Mačkovac, and the brotherhood of the Moštanica Monastery also led to the uprising. Jovan Jančić, a gunsmith from Sarajevo, smuggled arms for three years from the Military Frontier seeking to arm the Serb-inhabited districts between Una and Bosna rivers.

== Rebellion ==
The revolt broke out in the Bosnian Frontier and Bosnian Posavina. Jovan Jančić–Sarajlija was the organizer of the uprising, at first with support from bishop Venedikt Kraljević. Jančić negotiated with Serbia, Russia and France regarding the revolt. The Ottomans sensed that something was in planning, so they increased the terror against the population, and Kraljević fled to Austria. While planning the operation, Jančić turned to Austria and France for help, but without any success. In the dilemma of whether to start an uprising without proper planning, he was forestalled by a progress of events.

Peasants took up arms on 23 September 1809, in the region of Gradiška, beginning from Mašići. The fighting began on 25 September, and on the night of 25–26 September, the Ottomans, who had gathered a strong army, captured Jančić in his house. The rest of the rebels, without any commander, were afraid and retreated to their villages. Only the rebels on the mountains of Kozara and Motajica continued, and offered strong resistance, which the Ottomans finally crushed by mid-October, after burning villages and looting. The Roman Catholic population (local Croats, etc.) of the Bosnian frontier intended to join the uprising, but never did. After the crushing of the revolt in mid-October, the Ottoman government in the region captured the rebel leaders and executed them. Some rebel bands became brigands and maintained in the mountains, attacking the Turks. The revolt failed due to lack of coordination between the rebel units.

== Aftermath and legacy ==
In 1826, priest Đorđije Vujičić from Cikota made an unsuccessful attempt at raising a rebellion in Bosnia. Another revolt broke out in the region in 1834, following Priest Jovica's Rebellion, in Mašići, known as the "Second Mašići Rebellion". A memorial plaque stands in Mašići dedicated to the fallen people of both rebellions.

== See also ==
- List of Serbian Revolutionaries

== Sources ==
- Antić, Čedomir; Kecmanović, Nenad (2016). Историја Републике Српске.
- Bataković, Dušan T. (2006). "A Balkan-Style French Revolution? The 1804 Serbian Uprising in European Perspective". Balcanica. XXXVI. Belgrade: Балканолошки институт – via Balcanica.
- Bijelić, Stojan (7 May 1933). "Машићка буна". Врбаске новине (107). Banja Luka: Kralj. banska uprava Vrbaske banovine: 5.
- Đokić, Nebojša D.; Dumić, Olivera (2013). "БОРБЕ СРПСКИХ УСТАНИКА СА ОСМАНЛИЈАМА НА ДРИНИ И У РАШКОЈ ОБЛАСТИ 1807. ГОДИНЕ". Vesnik. 40. Belgrade: Vojni muzej: 59–78.
- Dušanić, Svetozar St. (1959). Spomenica povodom osamdesetogodišnjice okupacije Bosne i Hercegovine: 1878-1958: pedesetogodišnjice anekcije, 1908-1958 i četrdesetogodišnjice oslobođenja i ujedinjenja, 1918-1958. Srboštampa. pp. 38–.
- Čubrilović, Vasa (1939). Prvi srpski ustanak i bosanski Srbi. Geca Kon.
- Čubrilović, Vasa (1934). "Револуционарни покрети у Босанској Крајини у XIX веку". Гласник Југословенског професорског друштва. XIV (10─12): 902─910.
- Ekmečić, Milorad (2008). Дуго кретања између клања и орања: Историја Срба у Новом веку (1492-1992) (PDF). Belgrade: Завод за уџбенике.
- Milošević, Borivoje (2016). "Српско свештенство и ослободилачки покрети Срба у Босни у посљедњем вијеку турске управе" (PDF). Међународни научни скуп историчара Херцеговачки устанак 1875-1878. Gacko: 113–134.
- Stojančević, V. "Србија и ослобођење Босне у време Првог српског устанка". Српски народ у својој новијој историји, крај XVII–почетак XX века. Novi Sad.
- Teinović, Bratislav (2020). "Преглед српско-турског ратовања на Дрини (1804-1815)". Vojnoistorijski glasnik. 2: 9–35.
- Teinović, Bratislav (2018). "U trouglu velikih sila: Bosna i Hercegovina tokom Prvog srpskog ustanka (1804–1813)". Svarog (17). Nezavisni univerzitet Banja Luka: 43–55 – via CEEOL.
