= Cause 4 Concern =

- Also known as: Cause4Concern; C4C
- Origin: Guildford, Surrey, England
- Genres: Drum and bass
- Years active: 1999–present
- Label: Cause4Concern Recordings
- Members: Mark Clements (CZA)
- Past members: Edward Holmes (Optiv) Tobie Burrows, Stuart Perkins

Cause 4 Concern, seen stylized as Cause4Concern as well as C4C, is a drum and bass recording and production group originally based in Guildford, Surrey, England. Founded in 1999, the group started their own record label, Cause4Concern Recordings, for releasing their own material in addition to recordings from similar artists within the field of drum and bass. Their debut album, Pandemic, was released on 26 August 2009. The CD release included a bonus dj-mix containing many of their previously released singles up to that date. Following the death of former member Edward Holmes (Optiv) in January 2020, the group is now recognized as a solo venture by Mark Clements (CZA), maintained in honor of his former production partner.

Cause4Concern also released several records under the aliases nCODE and Troubled Mindz.

The group’s recording, “Spasm”, was featured in the video game Grand Theft Auto III, where it can be heard on the in-game radio station, MSX FM.
