= Adnan Harmandić =

Bosnian handball player (born 1983)

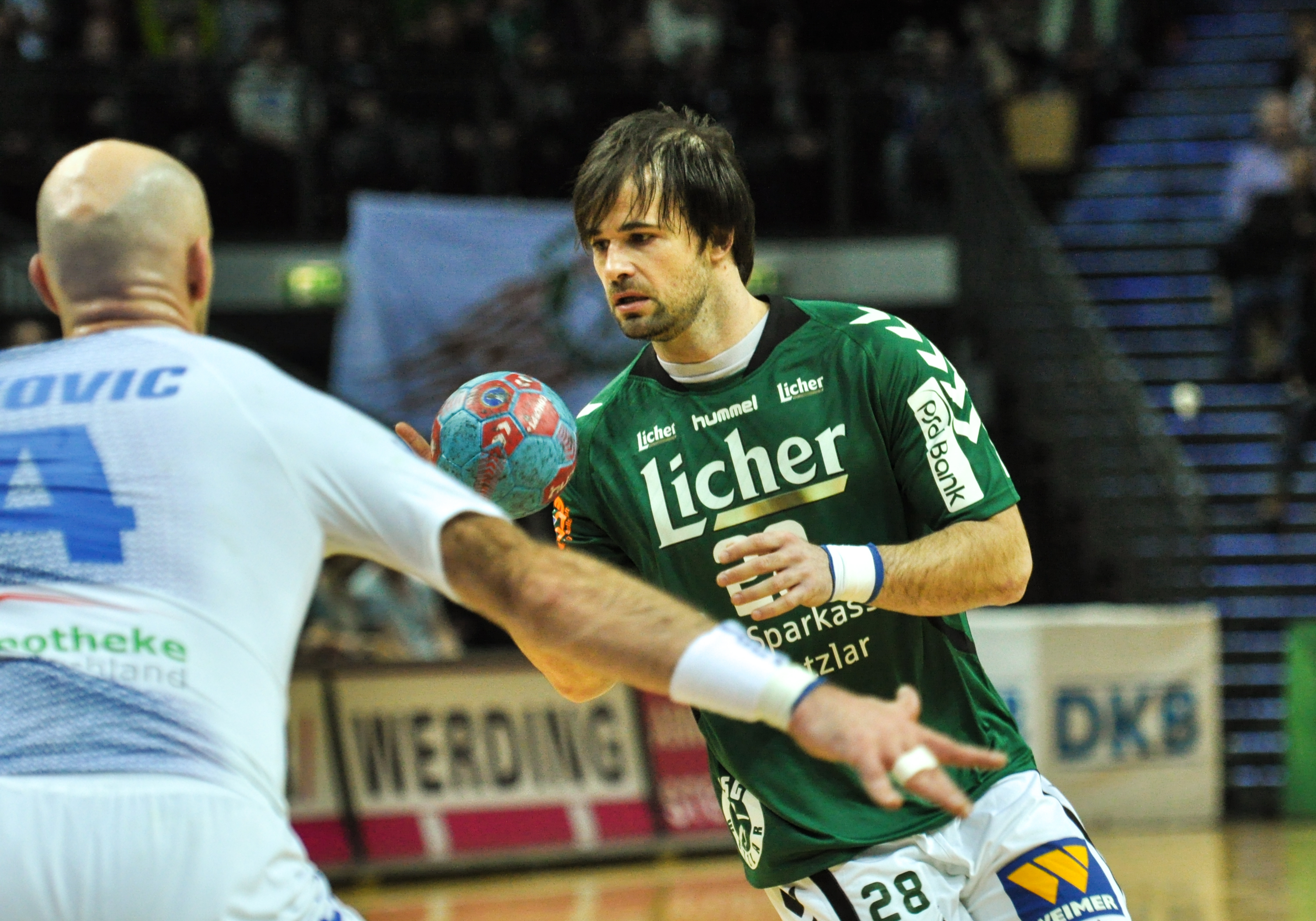
- Harmandić dribbling

Personal information
- Full name: Adnan Harmandić
- Born: 28 June 1983 (age 43) Zenica, SR Bosnia and Herzegovina, SFR Yugoslavia
- Height: 1.90 m (6 ft 3 in)

Sport
- Sport: Handball
- Position: Centre back
- Current club: RK Bosna Sarajevo
- Number: 8

Youth career
- Years: Team
- –: RK Čelik Zenica

Senior clubs
- Years: Team
- 2002-2006.: (Bosnia and Herzegovina) RK Izviđač
- 2006-2008.: (Bosnia and Herzegovina) RK Bosna Sarajevo
- 2008-2010.: (Slovenia) RK Gorenje Velenje
- 2010-2011.: (Denmark) B-Silkeborg H.
- 2011-2015.: (Germany) HSG Wetzlar
- 2015-2017.: (Germany) HSC 2000 Coburg
- 2017-2020.: (Bosnia and Herzegovina) RK Bosna Vispak
- 5.6.2021-: (Bosnia and Herzegovina) RK Bosna Sarajevo
National team
Years	Team	Apps	(Gls)
2002-2012.	Bosnia	78	(185)

Teams managed
- 3.2020-11.2020.: RK Bosna Vispak

Adnan Harmandić (born 28 June 1983 in Zenica, Bosnia and Herzegovina) is a retired Bosnian professional handball player.
