= Priest Jovica's Rebellion =

1834 rebellion in Bosnian Posavina

Date	10–13 March 1834
Location	Derventa and Gradačac nahiye, Bosnia Eyalet (modern Bosnia and Herzegovina)
Result	Ottoman victory

Belligerents
Christian peasants (predominantly local Serbs)	Ottoman Bosnia leadership

Commanders and leaders
Jovica Ilić	Unknown

Casualties and losses
2,000 killed	300 killed

Priest Jovica's Rebellion (Serbian: поп-Јовичина буна, romanized: pop-Jovičina buna) was a Christian peasant rebellion that broke out in the Derventa and Gradačac nahiye, in Bosnian Posavina, in 10–13 March 1834, organized by Orthodox priest Jovica Ilić from Banja Luka, stationed in Derventa at the time. The rebels were predominantly Orthodox (Serbs), but some Catholics (Croats) also joined.

Jovica Ilić corresponded with other Serbian Orthodox leaders and also sent letters to Serbian Prince Miloš Obrenović. He rallied other priests (such as Pavle Tvrtković, Milo Vitković and Stevan Avramović of Orašje) and the population around Podnovlje. Notable priests Tvrtković and Vitković who had fled to Serbia prior to the outbreak of the rebellion, had met in Požarevac with Prince Miloš whom they asked to take up the side of the Christians in Bosnia at the Porte. Those who stayed in Serbia prepared from Šabac a rebellion in the nahiye of Banja Luka, Bijeljina, Tuzla and Derventa. Tvrtković, who was Jovica's closest associate, organized people in Serbia, and at first had the support of Prince Miloš.

The rebellion broke out in the nahiye of Derventa and Gradačac in Bosnian Posavina. Odžak was set on fire by the rebels. 300 bey soldiers were killed. It was quickly suppressed by the Ottoman government. Some 600 Serbs in Derventa were killed in the aftermath. Some of the population migrated to Slavonia, part of the Habsburg monarchy. The Austrian government registered 326 immigrants to Austria, of whom 66 did not return to Bosnia. Jovica was wounded and fled across the Sava to the Habsburg monarchy. Decapitated rebel heads were put on display at the Gradačac fort walls. The Ottomans accused Jovica that he wanted to "make Serbia out of Bosnia" with the rebellion. After the collapse of the rebellion, Prince Miloš secretly received, hid and protected some of the rebel leaders and protested at the Porte due to the atrocities and penalties which had caused the uprising, and unrest not only in Bosnia but in Serbia also. Several thousand peasants were received in Serbia, especially from Bosanska Krajina, who sought refuge from feudal terror; these were settled in Podrinje and Šumadija. The rebellion echoed to Bosanska Krajina, where the Second Mašići Rebellion broke out. A similar peasant rebellion broke out in Niš.

In Majevac, near Doboj, a Serbian Orthodox convocation was held which marked 170 years since the rebellion.

== See also ==
- Jančić's rebellion

== Sources ==
Books

- Ćorović, Vladimir (1989). Istorija Srba. Vol. 3. Beogradski izdavačko-grafički zavod. pp. 75–. ISBN 9788613003816.
- Dušanić, Svetozar St. (1959). Spomenica povodom osamdesetogodišnjice okupacije Bosne i Hercegovine: 1878–1958 : pedesetogodišnjice anekcije, 1908–1958 i četrdesetogodišnjice oslobođenja i ujedinjenja, 1918–1958. Srboštampa.
- Ekmečić, Milorad (1989). Stvaranje Jugoslavije 1790–1918. Prosveta. ISBN 9788607004324.
- Ljušić, Radoš (2004). Кнежевина Србија, 1830–1839. Завод за уџбенике и наставна средства. ISBN 9788617116147.
- Potkozarac, Jovan (1969). Srbi u. Vol. 2. p. 12.
- Stojančević, Vladimir (1971). Južnoslovenski narodi u Osmanskom Carstvu od Jedrenskog mira 1829. do Pariskog kongresa 1856. godine. Izdavačko-štamparsko preduzeće PTT.
- Tutnjević, Staniša (2007). Поп Јовичина буна [Priest Jovica's Rebellion]. Едиција: Векови. ISBN 978-86-7396-156-9.

Journals

- Ivić, Aleksa (1919). "Устанак попа Јовице Илића". Zagreb: 3–14.
- Stojančević, Vladimir (1959). "Политички погледи кнеза Милоша Обреновића". Историјски часопис. 9–10. Научно дело: 345–362.
- Stranjaković, D. (1931). "Буна Срба хришћана у Босни 1834. године". Godišnjica Nikole Čupića. XL (40). Državna štamparija: 129, 154, 155.
- Stranjaković, D. (1939). "Pop Jovičina buna u Bosni 1834 godine". Kalendar. SPKD Prosvjeta.
