= Nadix =

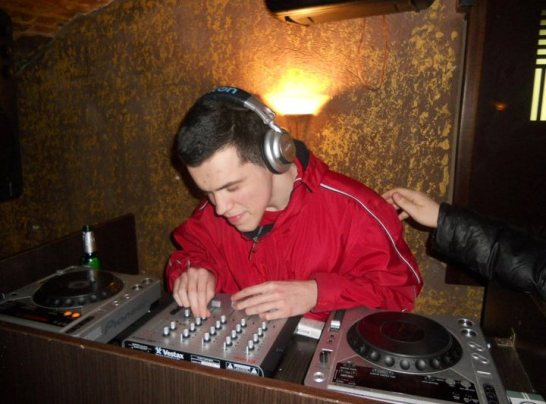
- Nadix at work

Background information
- Birth name: Nadir Hajro
- Born: March 26, 1989 (age 35); Sarajevo, SR Bosnia and Herzegovina, SFR Yugoslavia
- Genres: Trance, techno
- Occupation(s): Musician, record producer
- Instrument(s): Sequencer, keyboard
- Years active: 2008–present
- Labels: Purple Gate Records, BK Electronics, Qbed Records

Nadix (born Nadir Hajro on March 26, 1989 in Sarajevo) is a Bosnian trance musician, body builder and law graduate who has cerebral palsy. He produces music in the genres of Psy, Trance, Tribal, Progressive, Tech House and Hard Techno. He has featured on BH Radio 1 in the "Tram Ride" show and on eFM Radio in the "Fast Forward Radio Show".

== Discography ==
=== Albums ===
- 2011 Sky Is A Limit [Purple Gate Records]

=== Compilation albums ===
- 2012 Purple Gate Seampler Vol.3 [Purple Gate Records]

=== Singles/EPs ===
- 2011 Road To Heaven EP [Purple Gate Records]
- 2011 Underground Sound EP [Purple Gate Records]
- 2012 Rhythm of the Soul EP [BK Electronics]
- 2012 Blue Sky EP [QBed Records]
