= Hasan Čemalović =

Bosnian architect

- Born: Mostar, PR Bosnia and Herzegovina, FPR Yugoslavia
- Occupation: Architect
- Years active: 1971–present

Hasan Ćemalović is a Bosnian architect. He was born in Mostar and graduated from the Sarajevo Architecture College in 1971. He also worked at the same college from 1976 until 1986 as an assistant of designing. In 2000 he served as a president of the Bosnia-Herzegovina Architect Association DAS - SA.

He remained in the city during the 1992-1996 Siege of Sarajevo where he organized and led the project "WARCHITECTURE" - "Urbicide - Sarajevo" which had its international promotion at the George Pompidu Center in 1994. At the initiative of the American National Institute for Architecture, he and his colleagues organized an exhibition of works of Sarajevo architects called "Sarajevo - Dreams and Reality" that was presented in New York City in 1995. He wrote and published a book called "Mostar May 1994".

His designs include a Sports and Business Center in Tuzla.
