= Optiv =

American information security company

Optiv Security, Inc.
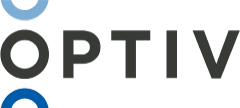
- Type: Private
- Industry: Information security
- Founded: 2015 (merger of Accuvant and FishNet Security)
- Headquarters: Denver, Colorado, United States
- Key people: Kevin Lynch (CEO); Heather Strbiak (Chief Human Resources Officer); Heather Rim (Chief Marketing Officer); Josh Locker (Executive Vice President, Sales)
- Revenue: ▲US$2.5 billion (2018); US$2.2 billion (2017)
- Number of employees: 2,400 (2024)
- Parent: KKR
- Website: https://optiv.com/

Optiv Security, Inc. ("Optiv") is a privately owned information security services and security technology reseller company based in Denver, Colorado. Optiv is a solutions integrator that delivers end-to-end cybersecurity services globally.

Optiv has served more than 7,500 clients across 70 countries worldwide since 2015. Optiv is exclusively focused on cybersecurity and risk.

Optiv's vendor partner ecosystem includes over 800 established and emerging cybersecurity software providers and hardware manufacturers.

In 2017, Optiv was acquired by global investment company Kohlberg Kravis Roberts (KKR).

== History ==
On November 5, 2014, security firms Accuvant and FishNet Security announced that they would join forces to create a new company. The merger would create a roughly $1.5 billion information security giant with solutions covering nearly every aspect of cyber defense.

The merger was completed on February 2, 2015, when the company announced that the previously announced transaction had closed. The new company was owned primarily by the Blackstone Group, a private equity firm that acquired a majority stake in Accuvant in March 2014.

On April 21, 2015, Accuvant and FishNet Security announced plans to launch their new, combined corporate name and brand, and to begin conducting business as Optiv Security in the summer of 2015. The new Optiv brand was officially launched at the Black Hat USA conference in August 2015.

In 2016, Optiv acquired Advancive, Adaptive Communications, and substantially all assets of Evantix. That year, Optiv also made senior executive hires including a new CIO and Country General Manager for Canada.

In November 2016, Optiv filed to become a publicly traded company. However, on February 1, 2017, Optiv announced that it had been acquired by the global investment firm KKR. In 2017, Optiv also expanded operations globally in Canada – including the acquisition of Conexsys, a Toronto-based security solutions provider.

In March 2017, the company announced it was acquiring Comm Solutions, a Pennsylvania-based cybersecurity firm.

Optiv appointed Dave DeWalt and General (Ret.) David Petraeus to its board of directors in September 2017.

In mid-2018, Optiv moved its headquarters into the newly constructed 40-story 1144 Fifteenth Tower in downtown Denver and is considered a primary tenant of the building.

In July 2019, Optiv announced the opening of its Dallas Innovation and Fusion Center, an approximately 14,000 square-foot facility located in Frisco, Texas. This facility features an Advanced Fusion Center (AFC), an evolution of the security operations center (SOC) model. The AFC combines global cybersecurity experts with data analytics, robotics, machine learning, intelligence and automation capabilities.

In April 2022, Optiv began offering a Privileged Access Management as-a-Service (PMaaS). In August 2022, Optiv began working with Shared Services Canada, a Canadian government information technology agency.

Optiv acquired ClearShark, a reseller of cybersecurity to the federal government, in March 2023.

== Services and solutions ==
Optiv provides organizational cybersecurity services and solutions. Their offerings encompass business strategy and planning, monitoring and operations, technology integration and deployment and defenses and controls.

Optiv's services are structured across various domain verticals:

- Cyber Digital Transformation
- Identity and Access Management (IAM)
- Strategy and Risk Management (SRM)
- Managed Security Operations (SecOps)
- Threat Management
- Architecture and Engineering

== Ownership ==
Global investment firm KKR & Co is the majority owner of Optiv Security, alongside an ownership team that includes The Blackstone Group among other minority investors.

KKR has offices in 20 cities across 15 different countries and is regarded as one of the top private equity firms in the world based on capital raised. KKR has completed private equity transactions with approximately $610 billion of total enterprise value as of June 30, 2019. Technology is noted as one of KKR's core industries in the Americas.

== Awards and accolades ==
- In 2019, Optiv was ranked in the top 10% of solution providers by revenue according to the CRN Solution Provider 500.
- Cybersecurity Ventures included Optiv on its annual list of the world's hottest pure-play cybersecurity companies to watch in 2020.
- In June 2019, Optiv announced that it was ranked as the top pure-play security solutions integrator on The Channel Company's 2019 SP500 for the third consecutive year. The SP500 annually ranks the top service providers, integrators and IT consultants by services revenue in North America.
- Optiv earned Frost & Sullivan's 2018 Competitive Strategy Innovation and Leadership Award in the North American managed and professional security services market.
- Optiv was recognized in the 2017 Inc. 5000 as one of North America's fastest-growing private companies.
