= Benjamin Burić =

Bosnian handball player

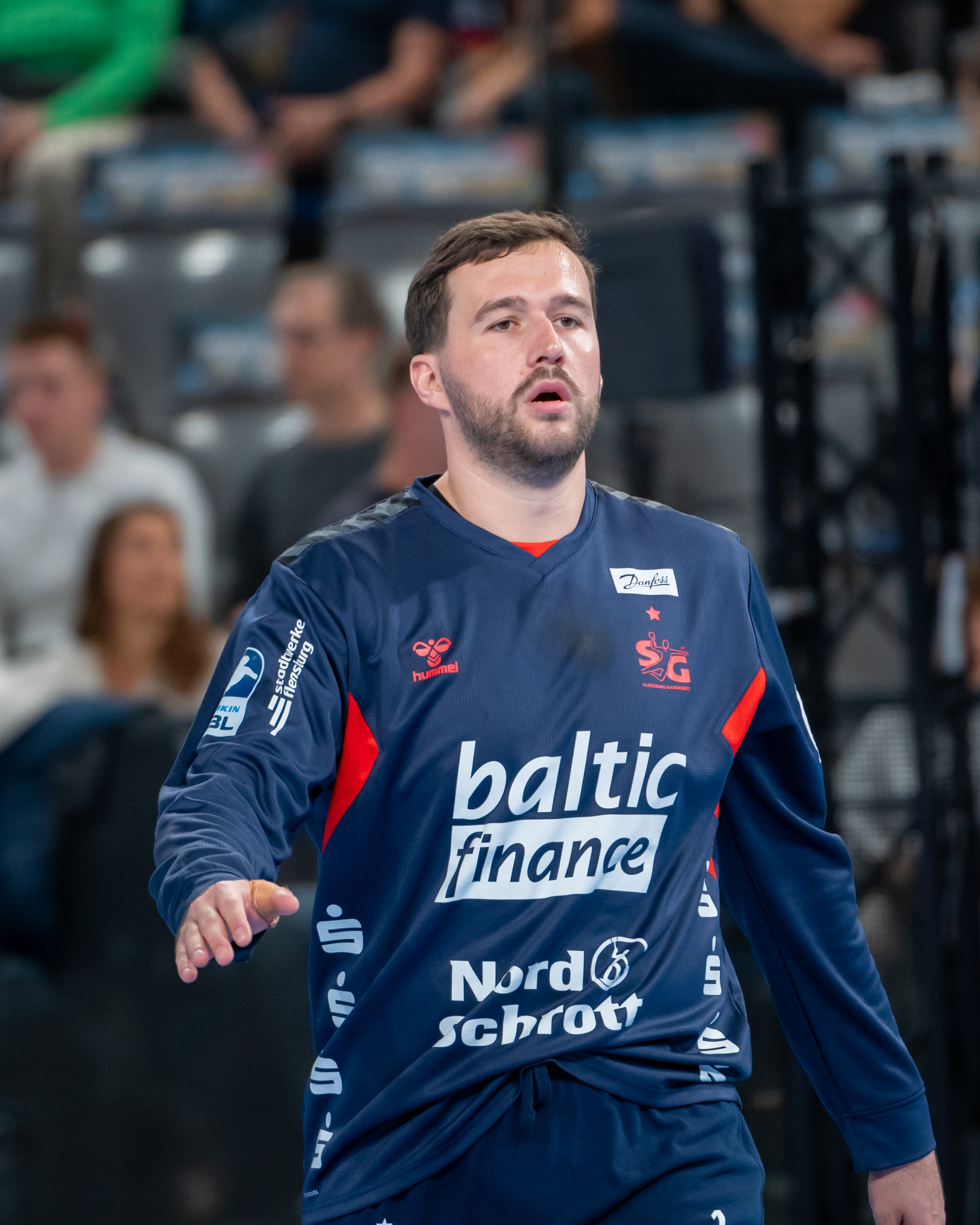

Personal information
- Nationality: Bosnian
- Born: 20 November 1990 (age 35) Doboj, SFR Yugoslavia
- Height: 1.97 m (6 ft 6 in)

Sport
- Sport: Handball
- Position: Goalkeeper
- Current club: SG Flensburg-Handewitt
- Number: 1

Senior clubs
- Years: Team
- –: RK Maglaj
- 2010–2013: HRK Izviđač
- 2013: RK Borac m:tel
- 2013–2016: RK Gorenje Velenje
- 2016–2018: HSG Wetzlar
- 2018–: SG Flensburg-Handewitt
National team
Years	Team	Apps	(Gls)
2009–2025	Bosnia and Herzegovina	75	(1)

Benjamin Burić (born 20 November 1990) is a Bosnian handball player for SG Flensburg-Handewitt.

He is the twin brother of Senjamin Burić.

== Honours ==
=== Club ===
Flensburg-Handewitt

- Handball-Bundesliga: 2018–19
