= Muhamed Toromanović =

Bosnian handball player

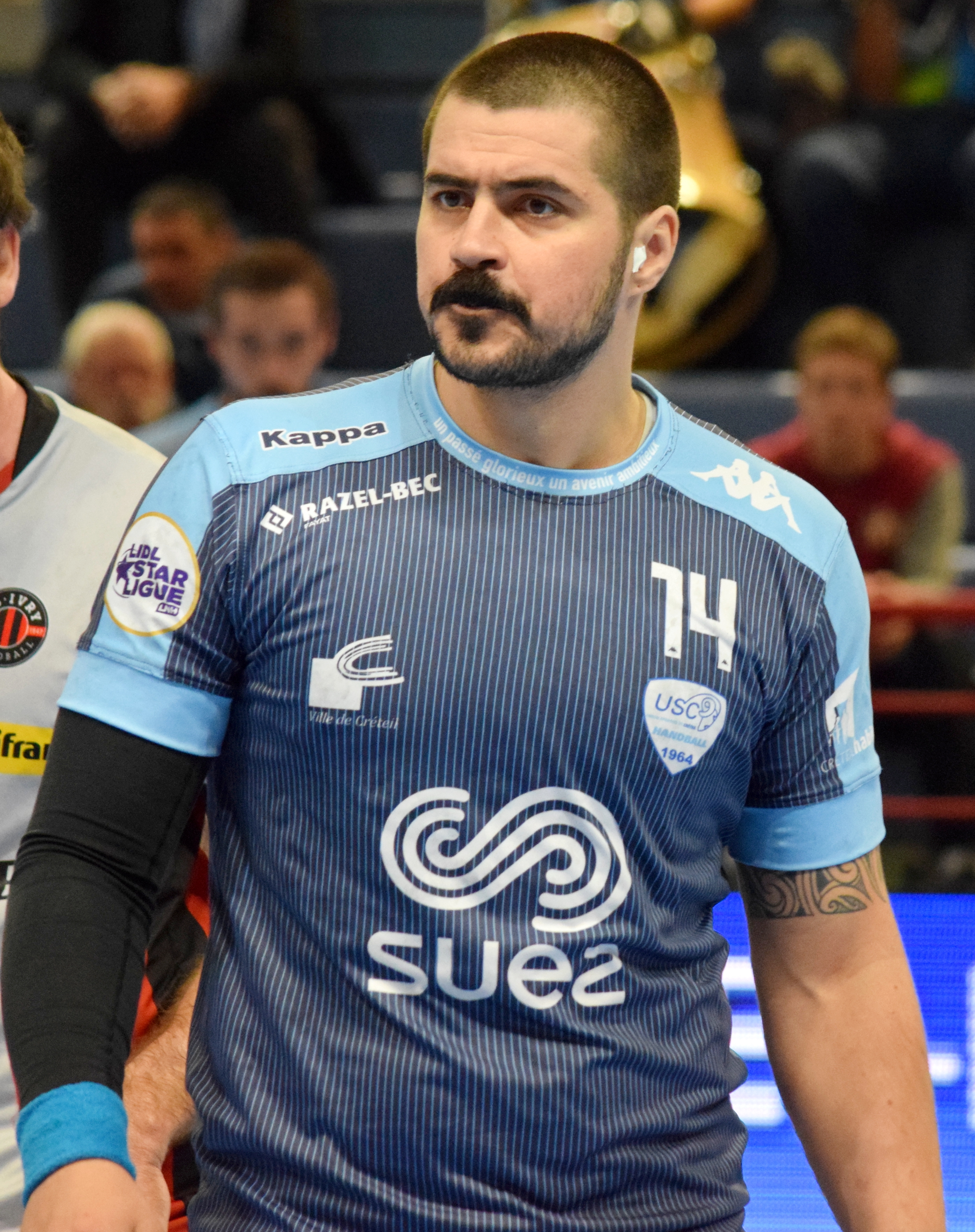

Personal information
- Nationality: Bosnian
- Born: 9 April 1984 (age 42) Cazin, SR Bosnia and Herzegovina, SFR Yugoslavia
- Height: 1.90 m (6 ft 3 in)

Sport
- Sport: Handball
- Position: Pivot
- Current club: ORK Bosna Sarajevo
- Number: 20

Senior clubs
- Years: Team
- 2003–2008: RK Bosna Sarajevo
- 2008–2011: KIF Kolding
- 2011–2014: Wisła Płock
- 2014–2018: US Creteil
- 2018–2019: RK Gračanica
- 2019: HC Bosna Visoko
- 2020: RK Slavija Istočno Sarajevo
- 2020–: RK Bosna Sarajevo
National team
Years	Team	Apps	(Gls)
2003–2020	Bosnia and Herzegovina	137	(425)

Muhamed Toromanović (born 9 April 1984) is a Bosnian handball player for RK Slavija Istočno Sarajevo.

He was the captain of the Bosnian national team.
