= Pavle Tvrtković =

Serbian Orthodox priest

Pavle Tvrtković (Serbian Cyrillic: Павле Твртковић; fl. 1834–51) was a Serbian Orthodox priest from Bosnia who participated in the rebellion organized by priest Jovica Ilić in northeastern Ottoman Bosnia in March 1834, published a collection of Old Serbian documents in 1840, and was the Serbian court priest of Prince Mihailo Obrenović (r. 1839–42).

Tvrtković was from Bosnia. Tvrtković, who was Jovica's closest associate and had in the preceding years fled to Belgrade, organized people in Serbia, and at first had the support of Serbian Prince Miloš Obrenović. Notable priests Tvrtković and Milo Vitković and some serfs from Bosnia had met in Požarevac with Prince Miloš whom they asked to take up the side of the Christians in Bosnia at the Porte. Those who stayed in Serbia prepared from Šabac a rebellion in the nahiye of Banja Luka, Bijeljina, Tuzla and Derventa. The rebellion, which broke out in the Derventa and Gradačac nahiye and was active 10–13 March 1834, was quickly suppressed by the Ottoman government. After the collapse of the rebellion, Prince Miloš received and protected some of the rebel leaders and protested at the Porte over the atrocities and penalties. Tvrtković, who since 1835 often signed himself as Karano-Tvrtković (Карано-Твртковић, sometimes rendered Каранотвртковић/Karanotvrtković), arrived at Trieste in September 1835 during his trip through Dalmatia and Montenegro. Tvrtković was hired as the court priest of Prince Mihailo Obrenović (r. 1839–42). In 1840, Tvrtković published The Serbian Memorials (Српске споменике/Srpske spomenike), a collection of Old Serbian documents from the Dubrovnik Archive. The publication sparked some controversy, as he had put his name on someone else's work and allegedly "barely could read". In December 1840 Tvrtković informed the Serbian court over the dissatisfaction of the Christians in Bosnia with the rule of Vecihi Pasha and failure to comply with the hatt-i sharif. When Prince Mihailo was forced to flee Serbia to Austrian territory in August or September 1842, Tvrtković likely before or together with him crossed into Zemun. Tvrtković spent the 1842–43 winter at Zemun, then went to Novi Sad. He lived in Novi Sad until May 1848. In Novi Sad, at Sima Adamović's house, he swore in some rebel leaders. He befriended writer Đorđe Rajković. He later stayed at Slavonski Brod, and was treated medically at Topusko. He died some years prior to 1870, as a parish priest in Slatina.

He wanted to change his listed surname in the baptism register, and was answered on 5 August 1851 by Orthodox bishop Jovanović that the name could not be changed without Imperial approval, and noted that Tvrtković had in his 27 November 1837 request signed only as "Karanović". In documents held at the Archive of the Eparchy of Upper Karlovac it is seen that he after 1834 signed as Karanović (Карановић), then Karano-Tvrtković, and finally in 1850 and 1851 as Tvrtković.

== Sources ==
- Ćorović, Vladimir (1989). Istorija Srba. Vol. 3. Beogradski izdavačko-grafički zavod. pp. 75–. ISBN 9788613003816.
- Dušanić, Svetozar St. (1959). Spomenica povodom osamdesetogodišnjice okupacije Bosne i Hercegovine: 1878-1958 : pedesetogodišnjice anekcije, 1908-1958 i četrdesetogodišnjice oslobođenja i ujedinjenja, 1918-1958. Srboštampa.
- Ekmečić, Milorad (1989). Stvaranje Jugoslavije 1790-1918. Prosveta. ISBN 9788607004324.
- Ljušić, Radoš (2004). Кнежевина Србија, 1830-1839. Завод за уџбенике и наставна средства. ISBN 9788617116147.
- Popović-Petković, Radmila (1972). Postanak i razvoj arhivistike u Srbiji i Makedoniji. Zajednica arhiva Srbije.
- Potkozarac, Jovan (1969). Srbi u. Vol. 2. p. 12.
- Stajić, Vasa (1951). Građa za političku istoriju Novog Sada. Matica srpska.
- Stojančević, Vladimir (1959). "Политички погледи кнеза Милоша Обреновића". Историјски часопис. 9–10. Научно дело: 345–362.
- Stranjaković, D. (1931). "Буна Срба хришћана у Босни 1834. године". Godišnjica Nikole Čupića. XL (40). Državna štamparija.
- Историско друштво у Новом Саду (1929). Гласник Историског друштва у Новом Саду. Vol. 2. Историско друштво у Новом Саду.
- Univerzitet u Sarajevu (1987). Pregled. Vol. 77. Univerzitet u Sarajevu.
- Društvo bibliotekara N. R. Srbije (1975). Bibliotekar. Vol. 27. Društvo bibliotekara N. R. Srbije.
- Matica: list za književnost i zabavu. Vol. 5. Platonova štamparija. 1870. p. 22.
- Novak, Viktor, ed. (1951). Istoriski časopis. Vol. 2–4. pp. 47, 49, 65, 67.
