= Monolit =

Metal band from Bosnia and Herzegovina

Monolit (band)
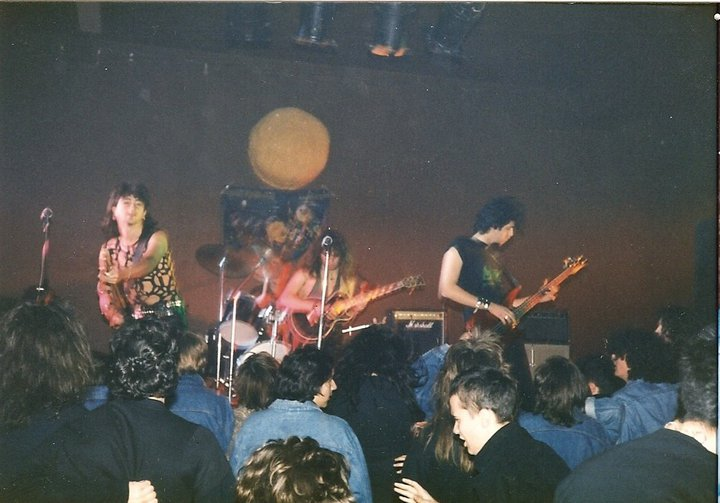

Background information
- Origin: Mostar, Bosnia and Herzegovina
- Genres: Heavy Metal, thrash metal
- Years active: 1988–1992 / 2006-2008
- Labels: One Records, Mighty Monster Records
- Members: Predrag Glogovac; Slobodan Ernjakovic
- Past members: Zlatko Mehic (deceased); Marin Bago; Drazan Nastic; Sasa Kapor
- Website: http://www.myspace.com/monolitband

Monolit was a metal band from Mostar, Bosnia and Herzegovina, formed in 1988. It was founded by the late Zlatko Mehić, Marin Bago, Predrag Glogovac and Slobodan Ernjakovic.

== Biography ==
Same year, they recorded the first three-song demo that got a good reception amongst both fans and critics. In 1990, they recorded the second three-song demo, although it was a slight departure from earlier works that were characterized by more heavier direction. New sound was welcomed throughout Yugoslavia in all the important music magazines In addition, the band expanded their fan base, which culminated with few big live shows around the country.

In 1991 they had their first album's worth of material recorded, and they played in the Sarajevo at the biggest metal festival in former Yugoslavia, in front of 2,500 fans. In 1992 civil war was spreading across the country and band is broke up. Upon their first meeting since the civil war in 2006, two band members paid a tribute to a lost friend. They re-recorded "Kletva", in a memory of the band's drummer and the founding member, Zlatko Mehic (Zuba), who had died in the war in 1993.

The decision was made for the band to continue on, even though Predrag is in Norway, and Slobodan in Canada. Monolit released its first album, Arcana Balkanica, in 2008, a collection of old and new songs on One Records from Belgrade. In 2011 Mighty Records from Germany contacted the band about officially releasing old songs. This record was released under the name Deimos Tapes. Mascot of the band was Joker with name Deimos, that's why name Deimos Tapes. Although not new material, this is rather songs recorded in period from 88 to 92 re-mastered with 2 newly recorded songs as bonus.

== Band members ==
Current

- Slobodan Ernjaković – lead vocals, guitar (1988–1992 / 2006–2008)
- Predrag Glogovac – guitar (1988–1992 / (2006-2008)

Former

- Zlatko Mehić (deceased) – drums (1986–1992)
- Marin Bago – Bass (1986–1992)
- Miljan Bjelica - Guitar(1986-1987)
- Emil Glavas - Vocalist (1986-1987)
- Svjetlan Skakic - Guitar (1987-1988)
- Dražan Nastić – Vocals (1991)
- Saša Kapor – Guitar(1991)

== Discography ==
=== Albums ===
- Arcana Balkanica (2008)
- Deimos Tapes (2012)

=== Demos ===
- Demo (3 tracks) (1988)
- Demo (3 tracks) (1990)
