= Arnela Šabanović =

Bosnian-Herzegovinian footballer

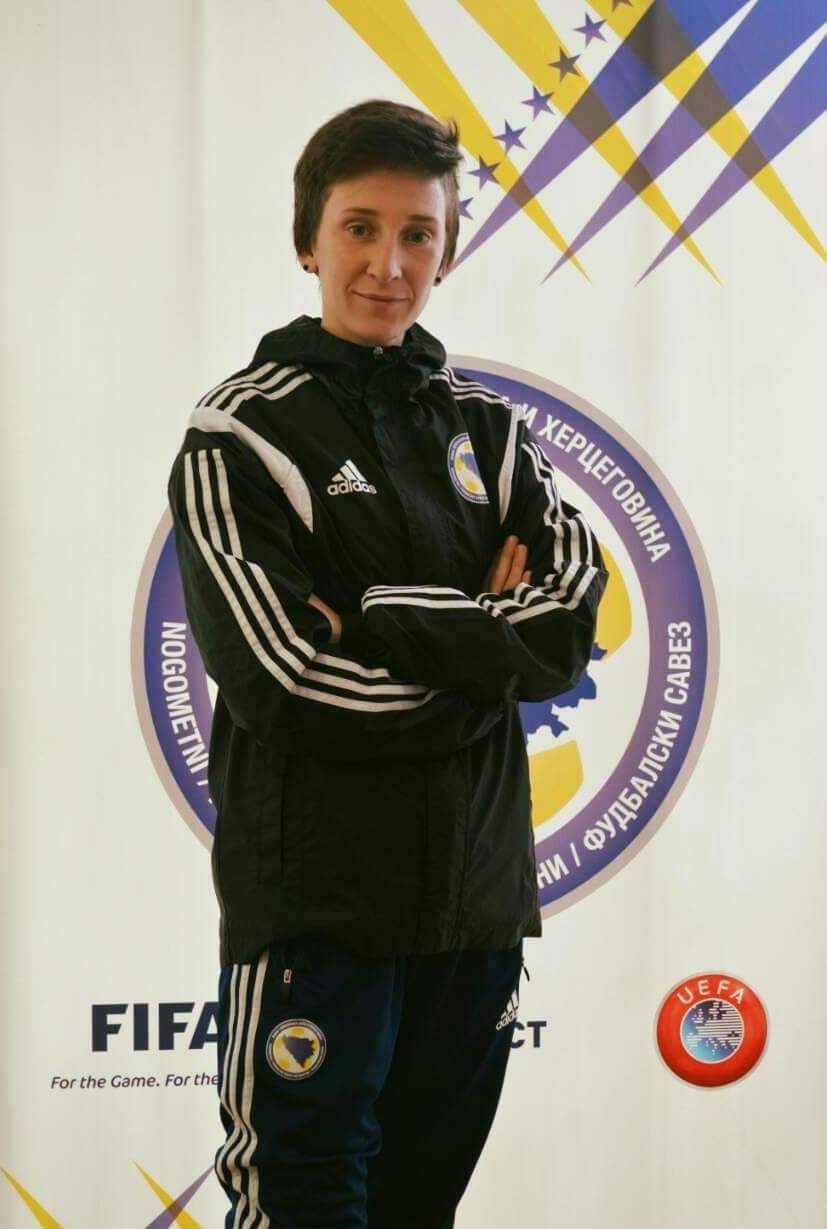

Personal information
- Date of birth: June 16, 1991 (age 35)
- Place of birth: Zenica
- Height: 1.73 m (5 ft 8 in)
- Position: Goalkeeper

Team information
- Current team: SFK 2000 Sarajevo
- Number: 30

Senior career*
Years	Team	Apps	(Gls)
2007–2013	ŽNK Čelik Zenica		
2013–2014	ŽNK Mladost Nević Polje		
2014–2017	ŽNK Čelik Zenica		
2017–	SFK 2000 Sarajevo		

International career
2012–	Bosnia and Herzegovina		
- * Club domestic league appearances and goals

Arnela Šabanović (born 16 June 1991) is a Bosnian-Herzegovinian football goalkeeper, currently playing for SFK 2000 Sarajevo in the Bosnia and Herzegovina Women's Premier League. She is a member of the Bosnia and Herzegovina women's national football team.

== Career ==
Šabanović plays as a goalkeeper for Bosnian Women's Premier club SFK 2000 since July 2017, with which she played in the first round of the UEFA Women's Champions League. She is a member of the Women National football team of BiH since 2013. She also played for FC Čelik from Zenica, FC Mladost from Nević Polje.

== Personal life ==
Šabanović lives in Zenica.

Arnela's father, who was a goalkeeper and defended the colours of the club during his education in Brac had a great influence on her sporting activities.
