= Irfan Brkovic =

Bosnian creative technologist and interdisciplinary researcher

Irfan Brković
- Born: Irfan Brković; Tuzla, Bosnia and Herzegovina, SFR Yugoslavia
- Website: https://hypermosh.com/

Irfan Brković is a Bosnian creative technologist and artist-researcher working at the intersection of sound, light, and photosensitive media. He holds a Master of Fine Arts (2025) from Simon Fraser University's School for the Contemporary Arts, where he was awarded the Colin McPhee Graduate Scholarship Award in Fine Arts and the Special Graduate Entrance Scholarship Award in recognition of his contributions to interdisciplinary practice. His MFA research produced laserography, a self-engineered technique that uses sound-modulated laser systems to inscribe acoustic vibrations as permanent images onto photosensitive surfaces and architectural concrete, deposited in the SFU Summit Research Repository. He is a member of The Wooster Group and co-founder of Phase Space NYC.

== Career ==
In the early 2000s, Brković founded Fa11out, a Bosnian audio-visual drum and bass collective that released music for labels in the United Kingdom. He later co-founded Phase Space NYC, a laboratory for creative coding, vector synthesis, and experimental performance.

In 2019, Brković became lead video artist and interactive systems designer for The Wooster Group, a New York City-based experimental theater company, where he designed interactive video and light systems for live performances. While based in New York, he directed the documentary Songs of Woe, which premiered at Cineteca National Mexico, Warsaw Film Festival, Vilnius International Film Festival, and Kasseler Dokfest. His work Three Deaths (2020) premiered at the Sundance Film Festival.

Brković pursued his MFA at SFU's School for the Contemporary Arts in Vancouver, where he served as a researcher at Precursor Lab within the Goldcorp Centre for the Arts, collaborating with artists and researchers on new methods for interdisciplinary performance. His laserography research treats bunkers, monuments, and industrial ruins of the former Yugoslavia as instruments and storage media, exploring how ideological collapse and everyday violence can be written as visual residue. Recent work incorporates neural synthesis and interactive machine learning to reconstruct fragmented archives from war, protest, and migration.

Brković has been a visiting lecturer at the Sarajevo Film Festival and a panel speaker on arts and activism in Bosnia and Herzegovina.

== Awards ==
- Colin McPhee Graduate Scholarship Award in Fine Arts, Simon Fraser University School for the Contemporary Arts, 2022
- Special Graduate Entrance Scholarship Award, Simon Fraser University School for the Contemporary Arts, 2022
