= Nihad Hrustanbegovic =

- Born: Nihad Hrustanbegovic; 7 June 1973 (age 53); Bijeljina, SR Bosnia and Herzegovina, SFR Yugoslavia
- Genres: Classical, Contemporary, Sevdah, Jazz, Tango
- Occupations: Composer, concert accordionist, pianist
- Instruments: Accordion, Piano
- Years active: 1988–present
- Label: nihadhrustanbegovic.com
- Website: nihadhrustanbegovic.com

Nihad Hrustanbegović (born 7 June 1973) is a Bosnian-Dutch composer, accordionist and pianist from Amsterdam. He is considered to be one of the most prominent and successful solo concert accordion artists from Bosnia and Herzegovina and Netherlands.

== Music Education ==
Nihad began his music education at 9 at the music school in Bijeljina, Bosnia and Herzegovina. At 15, he attended the Music College at the University of Tuzla, Between 1988 and 1991, Nihad won five prizes as accordionist at the Concurs for Music Students of Bosnia and former Yugoslavia, among them three prizes as soloist. In 1995 he continued his music education in the Netherlands at the College for Arts in Arnhem at the Messiaen Academy – a master of music performance program where he received training from Miny Dekkers and Gerie Daanen. He followed this with several master classes, including in Groningen with Friedrich Lips, Margit Kern, James Crab and in Tilburg with Joseph Maccerollo. He took part in the 'European Project for New Accordion Music and Performance', an intensive program for accordion students in original music. Hrustanbegovic received a bachelor's degree in 2000, and in 2002 a Master of Music with Cum Laude.

== Professional career ==
Nihad Hrustanbegovic has performed extensively in the Netherlands:

- 1998 at The Vredenburg Music Centre in Utrecht during the Golden Jubilee of The Foundation for Refugee Students UAF in the presence Her Majesty Queen Beatrix.
- 2005 at the "Knight Hal" in The Hague during the fifth "Van Heuven Goedhart-Congres' and at the Concertgebouw in Amsterdam.

He has collaborated with artists including Al Di Meola, Grace Jones, The Jazz Orchestra of the Concertgebouw, the acrobatic theatre dancing group The Corpus, Flairck and Mozes Rosenberg.

Nihad Hrustanbegovic released his first solo album The Best of Concert Accordion in 2007. The CD debut was the National Dutch TV program De Wereld Draait Door. The self-produced recording includes classical transcriptions (Bach, Scarlatti, Grieg, Paganini), original contemporary works for solo accordion Gubaidulina, and world music compositions (Semionov, Hrustanbegovic). In the same year he composed and played music for a TV commercial for Heineken Extra Cold. During his first accordion recital on 6th juni 2010 in Concertgebouw in Amsterdam he presented his second solo album Opus 7 The Cross-over and got the huge appreciation in Dutch News Paper Trouw by the journalist Stan Rijven: "What Pablo Casals did for emancipation of the cello, and Astor Piazzola of the bandoneon is Nihad Hrustanbegovic doing for accordion. He gives a 'poor man's piano' admirable place at the Concert stage".

== Discography ==
=== Albums ===
- Une belle journée 2016
- The Four Seasons - Vivaldi (2015)
- Black Orpheus - Nihad Hrustanbegovic plays jazz (2013)
- Sevdah for Petronella - Nihad Hrustanbegovic plays the Piano (2013)
- Live in Het Concertgebouw Amsterdam (2011)
- Opus 87 The Cross over (2010)
- The Best of Concert Accordion (2007)

Recently he's played with Grace Jones, Al Di Meola, and the jazz orchestra of the Concertgebouw. In June 2010 he gave a recital in the 'Kleine Zaal' of the Concertgebouw in Amsterdam and presented his second solo CD, 'Opus 7 The Cross-over'.
