= List of people from Sarajevo =

Sarajevo has had a number of famous citizens over the years. They include an Academy Award winner, two Nobel Prize winners, musicians, novelists, athletes, actors, artists, designers, film directors, screenwriters, politicians etc. Sarajevo has also produced presidents for three countries.

Apart from people born in Sarajevo, this list also includes people that were or are associated with Sarajevo throughout their career, nevermind where they were actually born.

== A ==
- Abdulah Sidran (1944–2024), poet and screenwriter.
- Adela Jušić (born 1982), contemporary visual artist.
- Ademir Kenović (born 1950), film director and producer.
- Adi Granov (born 1977), comic book artist and conceptual designer.
- Adi Lukovac (1970–2006), musician.
- Adnan Hasković (born 1984), actor.
- Ahmed Imamović (born 1971), film director, film producer and screenwriter.
- Ajla Hodžić (born 1980), actress.
- Aleksandar Hemon (born 1964), writer, winner of a MacArthur Foundation grant.
- Ališer Sijarić (born 1969), contemporary classical music, electroacoustic music and computer music composer.
- Alma Bećirović, filmmaker and theatre director
- Amar Osim (born 1967), footballer and football coach.
- Amila Glamočak (born 1966), singer.
- Amra Silajdžić (born 1984), model and actress.
- Ana Radović (born 1986), handballer.
- Asim Ferhatović (1933–1987), footballer.

== B ==
- Bekim Fehmiu (1936–2010), actor.
- Billain (born 1983), drum and bass producer, DJ and sound designer.
- Bojan Hadzihalilovic (born 1964), graphic designer and creative director of a Bosnia and Herzegovina design company called Fabrika.
- Boris Novković (born 1967), Croatian singer-songwriter.
- Božidar Pavićević (1932–2004), actor.
- Božo Vrećo (born 1983), singer-songwriter.
- Braco Dimitrijević (born 1948), conceptual artist.
- Branko Đurić "Đuro" (born 1962), actor, film director and musician, lead singer of Bombaj Štampa.
- Brano Likić (born 1954), composer, producer, and performer.
- Bruce Dickinson (born 1958), singer of the heavy metal band Iron Maiden, honorary citizen of Sarajevo
- Bruno Urlić (born 1975), violinist and record producer.

== D ==
- Dado Džihan (born 1964), composer, music producer and sound master.
- Dalibor Talajić (born 1972), comic book artist for Marvel Comics.
- Damir Imamović (born 1987), singer-songwriter.
- Damir Džumhur (born 1992), tennis player.
- Danica Dakić (born 1962), artist and university professor.
- Daniel Kabiljo (1894–1944), Jewish Sephardi artist.
- Danina Jeftić (born 1986), actress and former handball player.
- Danis Tanović (born 1969), film director and screenwriter.
- Daria Lorenci Flatz (born 1976), television and film actress.
- Darko Ostojić (born 1965), musician and actor.
- David Elazar (1925–1976), Israeli general and IDF Chief of Staff.
- Davor Dujmović (1969–1999), actor.
- Davorin Popović (1946–2001), singer-songwriter, lead singer of Indexi and basketball player.
- Dino Merlin (born 1962), singer-songwriter and record producer.
- Dino Rešidbegović (born 1975), contemporary classical music and electronic/electroacoustic music composer.
- Dragan Marinković (born 1968), actor and TV personality.
- Dražen Janković (1965–2018), musician, composer, writer and actor.
- Dražen Ričl (1962–1986), musician, former lead singer of Crvena Jabuka.
- Dražen Žerić (born 1964), musician, current lead singer of Crvena Jabuka.

== E ==
- Edin Džeko (born 1986), footballer.
- Elmir Jukić (born 1971), film director and occasional screenwriter.
- Elvir Baljić (born 1974), footballer and football coach.
- Emir Kusturica (born 1954), film director, actor and musician.
- Endi E. Poskovic (born 1969), visual artist and printmaker.
- Enes Alić (born 1999), footballer.
- Erih Koš (1913–2010), writer and translator.
- Esther Gitman (born 1939), historian and expert.
- Eva von Berne (1910–2010), film actress.

== F ==
- Fahro Konjhodžić (1931–1984), film and television actor.
- Faruk Hadžibegić (born 1957), footballer and football coach.
- Faruk Sokolović (born 1952), film director, television producer, actor and screenwriter.
- Fazla (born 1967), singer.
- Feđa Isović (born 1965), screenwriter, part-time musician and part-time actor.
- Flory Jagoda (1923–2021), guitarist, composer and singer-songwriter.
- Fra Grgo Martić (1822–1905), friar and writer.

== G ==
- Gazi Husrev-beg (1480–1541), Sanjak-bey in the Ottoman Empire, greatest donor and builder of Sarajevo.
- Goran Bregović (born 1950), recording artist, composer and former guitarist of Bijelo Dugme.
- Goran Todić (born 1967), actor.

== H ==
- Hamdija Kreševljaković (1888–1959), historian.
- Hans Fronius (1903–1988), painter and illustrator.
- Hajrudin "Hari" Varešanović (born 1961), musician, lead singer of Hari Mata Hari.
- Haris Brkić (1974–2000), basketball player.
- Haris Džinović (born 1951), folk singer, composer and lyricist.
- Husref Musemić (born 1961), footballer and football coach.

== I ==
- Irfan Mensur (born 1952), theatre, television, and film actor.
- Irfan Peljto (born 1984), football referee.
- Ivan Štraus (1928–2018), architect.
- Ivana Gavrić (born 1980/1981), pianist.
- Ivana Miličević (born 1974), actress and model.
- Ivica Osim (1941–2022), footballer and football coach.

== J ==
- Jasmila Žbanić (born 1974), film director and screenwriter.
- Jasmin Geljo (born 1959), actor.
- Jasna Diklić (born 1946), theatre and film actress.
- Jasna Žalica (born 1968), actress.
- Josip Osti (1945–2021), poet, prose writer and essayist, literary critic, anthologist and translator.
- Julije Makanec (1904–1945), politician, teacher, philosopher and writer.
- Jura Stublić (born 1954), singer-songwriter.

== K ==
- Kemal Monteno (1948–2015), singer-songwriter.
- Dino Klisura (born 1999), musician and producer.

== L ==
- Luna Mijović (born 1991), actress.

== M ==
- Mehmedalija "Mak" Dizdar (1917–1971), poet.
- Maya Berović (born 1987), pop singer.
- Maya Kulenovic (born 1975), painter.
- Mediha Musliović (born 1975), actress.
- Mehmed Baždarević (born 1960), footballer and football coach.
- Memnun Hadžić (born 1981), boxer.
- Meris Muhović (born 1992), karate competitor.
- Mica Todorović (1900–1981), painter.
- Milan Jeger (1931–2007), swimmer.
- Milan Pavlović (born 1970), actor.
- Milan Ribar (1930–1996), footballer and football coach.
- Milić Vukašinović (born 1950), musician.
- Miljenko Jergović (born 1966), writer.
- Minja Subota (1938–2021), composer, musician, entertainer and photographer.
- Miraj Grbić (born 1976), actor and former musician, former lead singer of Karne.
- Mirza Delibašić (1954–2001), basketball player.
- Mladen Milicevic (born 1958), composer of experimental music, sound installation, and film music.
- Mladen Vojičić "Tifa" (born 1960), rock vocalist, former lead singer of Bijelo Dugme.
- Momo Kapor (1937–2010), novelist and painter.
- Muhamed Karamusić Nihadi (died 1587), poet.
- Mula Mustafa Bašeskija (1731–1809), chronicler, diarist, poet, calligrapher and retired Janissary in the Ottoman Empire.

== N ==
- Nedžad Husić (born 2001), taekwondo athlete.
- Nedžad Ibrišimović (1940–2011), writer and sculptor.
- Nela Hasanbegović (born 1984), sculptor.
- Nele Karajlić (born 1962), comedian, musician, composer, actor and television director.
- Nenad Marković (born 1968), basketball player.
- Nergisî (c. 1580–1635), Ottoman writer.
- Nijaz Ibrulj (born 1956), philosopher.

== O ==
- Ognjen Gajić (born 1963), intensive care physician, pulmonologist, university professor and a former musician.
- Ognjen Sokolović (born 1963), bobsledder.
- Oskar Danon (1913–2009), composer and conductor.

== P ==
- Peter Paduh (born 1977), Bosnian-born British businessman and social entrepreneur.
- Pjer Žalica (born 1964), film director and screenwriter.
- Predrag Danilović (born 1971), basketball player, former member of NBA's Miami Heat and Dallas Mavericks.
- Predrag Finci (born 1946), philosopher and writer.

== R ==
- Robert Rothbart (born as Boris Kajmaković in 1986), Bosnian-Israeli-American basketball player.

== S ==
- Sadžida Šetić (born 1968), actress.
- Safet Isović (1936–2007), sevdalinka singer.
- Safet Sušić (born 1955), footballer and football coach.
- Safvet-beg Bašagić (1870–1934), writer.
- Samir Ćeremida (born 1964), guitarist.
- Sanela Diana Jenkins (born 1975), entrepreneur, philanthropist and owner of NeuroDrinks from California.
- Sanjin Pehlivanović (born 2001), professional pool player
- Saša Lošić (born 1964), composer, musician, lead singer of Plavi orkestar.
- Saša Petrović (1962–2023), actor.
- Saša Toperić (born 1972), concert pianist and diplomat.
- Šejla Kamerić (born 1976), visual artist.
- Sejo Sexon (born 1961), musician, lead singer of Zabranjeno pušenje.
- Semka Sokolović-Bertok (1935–2008), actress.
- Senad Bašić (born 1962), actor and comedian.
- Senad Hadžimusić Teno (born 1957), musician.
- Shiye (born 1999), musician and producer.
- Sima Milutinović Sarajlija (1791–1847), poet.
- Slobodanka Stupar (born 1947), visual artist.

== T ==
- Tanja Softić (born 1966), visual artist and art educator.
- Tarik Samarah (born 1965), photographer.
- Tavakkoli Dede (died 1625), poet.
- Tomo Miličević (born 1979), musician.

== U ==
- Umihana Čuvidina (c. 1794–c. 1870), poet.

== V ==
- Vanessa Glodjo (born 1974), actress.
- Vesna Bugarski (1930–1992), Bosnia and Herzegovina's first female architect.
- Violeta Tomić (born 1963), television presenter and actress.
- Vladimir Prelog (1906–1998), Nobel prize winner for Chemistry.
- Vlado Pravdić (born 1949), musician.
- Vojo Dimitrijević (1910–1980), painters.

== Z ==
- Zaim Topčić (1920–1990), writer.
- Zana Marjanović (born 1983), actress.
- Zdravko Čolić (born 1951), pop-folk singer.
- Zlata Filipović (born 1980), novelist and short story writer.
- Zlatko Topčić (born 1955), writer and screenwriter.
- Zenit Đozić (born 1961), actor, humorist, television producer.
- Zijah Sokolović (born 1950), actor, writer and director.
- Zinaid Memišević (1950–2023), theatre and film actor.

== Ž ==
- Željko Bebek (born 1945), lead singer of Bijelo Dugme from 1974 to 1984.
- Zdravko Čolić (born 1951), pop singer and songwriter.
- Žan Marolt (1964–2009), actor.

== Politics ==
=== A ===
- Abdulah Skaka (born 1983), 38th mayor of Sarajevo.
- Aleksandra Đurović (born 1976), politician and diplomat.
- Alija Behmen (born 1940), 36th mayor of Sarajevo.
- Alija Izetbegović (1925–2003), first Bosnian president.

=== B ===
- Bakir Izetbegović (born 1956), politician.
- Benjamina Karić (born 1991), 39th and current mayor of Sarajevo.
- Bogić Bogićević (born 1953), politician.
- Boris Tadić (born 1958), President of Serbia.
- Branko Crvenkovski (born 1962), President of the Republic of Macedonia.

=== E ===
- Edin Forto (born 1972), 16th prime minister of Sarajevo Canton.
- Emerik Blum (1911–1984), businessman, 26th mayor of Sarajevo.

=== I ===
- Isa-Beg Ishaković (15th century), general, first governor of the Ottoman province of Bosnia, and founder of the cities of Sarajevo and Novi Pazar.
- Ivan Barbalić (born 1975), diplomat.
- Ivo Komšić (born 1948), 37th mayor of Sarajevo.

=== M ===
- Mario Nenadić (born 1964), 17th prime minister of Sarajevo Canton.
- Mehmed Kapetanović (1839–1902), 2nd mayor of Sarajevo.
- Mila Mulroney (born 1953), former first lady of Canada.
- Muhamed Sacirbey (born 1956), lawyer, businessman, and diplomat.
- Mustafa Fadilpašić (1830–1892), 1st mayor of Sarajevo.

=== N ===
- Nenad Kecmanović, politician, political scientist, sociologist, political analyst, publicist, professor of political science.
- Nezir Škaljić (1844–1905), 3rd mayor of Sarajevo.

=== S ===
- Semiha Borovac (born 1955), 35th mayor of Sarajevo.
- Srđan Dizdarević (1952–2016), journalist, diplomat, and activist.
- Sven Alkalaj (born 1948), diplomat.

=== V ===
- Vojislav Šešelj (born 1954), politician, former deputy prime minister of Serbia and convicted war criminal.

=== Ž ===
- Željko Komšić (born 1964), politician and Golden Lily recipient.
- Zlatko Lagumdžija (born 1955), diplomat.
