= Sulejman Kupusović =

Bosnian theater director

- Born: 7 April 1951; Kladanj, Yugoslavia
- Died: 15 August 2014 (aged 63); Sarajevo, Bosnia and Herzegovina
- Occupation: Director
- Years active: 1973–2014

Sulejman Kupusović (7 April 1951 – 15 August 2014) was a Bosnian theater director. Also, he directed some television films and series.

== Biography ==
In 1974, Kupusović received a diploma from the Academy of Theatre and Film Arts in Zagreb, as a director of theater, film and television. He later studied philosophy and comparative literature at the University of Zagreb. He directed in theaters across the former Yugoslavia, as well as the first Bosnian opera, Hasanaginica, which premiered in Sarajevo on 18 March 2000. In addition to theater performances, he has directed several TV films, dramas and sitcoms. He directed the award-winning 2011 theater play Krokodil Lacoste written by Zlatko Topčić, in Chamber Theater 55.

Kupusović died aged 63 in the Bosnian capital city after a long illness. After his death, the stages of the Sarajevo National Theatre where Kupusović directed a number of plays were covered with white roses. The memorial began with the John Lennon song Working Class Hero as Kupusović's paintings were shown on screen.

== Filmography ==
Year	Film	Notes
1973	Otac i neki važni ljudi	TV film
1974	Oj, živote	TV film
1974	Mula Mustafa Bašeskija	TV biographical film
1975	Događaj na drugom peronu	TV film
1976	Teversenove bajke	TV series
1978	Priča o kmetu Simanu	TV film
1979	Tale	TV series; 8 episodes
1981	Zajedno	TV film
1981	Veselin Masleša	TV biographical film
1990	Memoari porodice Milić	TV series
2002–03	Viza za budućnost	TV series
2002	Viza za budućnost: Novogodišnji special	TV New Year's Special
2009	Žene s broja 13	TV series
