= Il' je vedro, il' oblačno =

Bosnian folk song

"Il' je vedro, il' oblačno" (English: It's either clear (no clouds in the sky), or clouded) is a Bosnian traditional folk song Sevdalinka. It was interpreted by several notable singers: Emina Zečaj, Hanka Paldum, Božo Vrećo, Zaim Imamović.

== In popular culture ==
Adi Lukovac's and Emina Zečaj's version was used in the 2003 Bosnian film Remake (Remake - soundtrack), which made the song worldwide famous. In the cult scene, it was performed by the actor Mario Drmać, whose unique voice contributed to its success.

== Lyrics ==
Lyrics in Bosnian
English translation

Il' je vedro, il' oblačno,
Il' je hladna noć,
Il' je sunce, il' je mjesec,
Il' je b'jeli dan?
Nit' je vedro, nit' oblačno,
Nit' je tamna noć,
Nit' je sunce, nit' je mjesec,
Nit' je b'jeli dan,
Već je ono Sokolović,
Mlad Ibrahim-beg.
Zanio se, unio se,
U svoj golem nam,
Što on ljubi sultaniju,
Sultan Zulejhu!
"Reci Zulko, reci dušo,
šta sam tebi ja?"
"Ti si, Ibro, alem sunce,
što nad nama sja!"

It's either clear, or clouded
Or is it a cold night
It's either the sun, or the moon
Or is it a white day?
It's neither clear, nor clouded
Nor is it a dark night
It's neither the sun, nor the moon
Nor a white day,
Instead it's Sokolović,
Young Ibrahim bey.
Got carried away, carried into,
His immense intent,
That he loves sultana,
Sultana Zuleyha!
"Tell me Zulka, tell me my love,
what am I to you?"
"You are, Ibro, the jewel Sun,
that glows upon us!"

== See also ==
- Music of Bosnia and Herzegovina
- Soundtrack
