= Zoran Bečić =

Zoran Bečić (April 2, 1939 – March 29, 2006) was one of the most prominent artists of the Bosnian theatrical community in the 20th century.

One of the founding actors of Sarajevo War Theatre, he studied acting at the Belgrade Academy of Dramatic Arts, graduating in 1966. Bečić's professional acting career began in Dubrovnik, but after two years, he joined Sarajevo's Malo pozorište (Little Theatre), the predecessor of today's Kamerni teatar 55 (Chamber Theatre 55). He made his debut in Radoslav Dorić's Noć ubica (The night of murderers).

Following several notable roles, in 1971 he decides to try his luck in Belgrade, but returns to Sarajevo's National Theatre, two years later. For the next two decades, he continues his collaboration with Kamerni teatar 55, earning three Zlatni lovorov vijenac (Golden Wreath of Laurel) Awards at the international theatre festival MESS. The last one, in 2004, was given to him for Life Achievement and Contribution to Performing Arts.

During the 1991–1995 Sarajevo siege, Bečić participates in the first theatrical project that was to jump-start Sarajevo's war production scene, the famous Sklonište (The Shelter), and directs another - Memoari Mine Hauzen (The Memoirs of Mina Hauzen).

Asked about his decision to stay in Sarajevo during the war, he said: "Many have asked me if I, a Serb from Čačak, ever regretted staying in Sarajevo for the duration of the war. Never. God forbid that it ever happens again, but I would do it all over again. With all the sadness, tragedy and horror that this city had been through, there was equally as much warmth, love, understanding and tender words."

Bečić's film and TV credits include appearances in TV series Viza za budućnost (2002), and Aleksa Santic (1990).

In March 2006, he made his first and last appearance alongside his daughter, actress Zorana Bečić, in Safet Plakalo's Lutkino bespuće (A Doll's Wasteland). He died two weeks later on the eve of the premiere of Rodoljupci at Sarajevo's National Theatre, where he was the Director of Drama. Bečić was buried at Sarajevo's Lav cemetery.

== Filmography ==
Year	Title	Role	Notes
1966	San		
1968	Isten és ember elött	Dmitrisz	
1969	Neka daleka svjetlost	Slavko	
1972	Walter Defends Sarajevo	Agent Gestapoa - lazni kurir	
1990	Silent Gunpowder	Seljak IV	
1991	Moj brat Aleksa		
2002-2007	Viza za budućnost	Oskar Prohaska	TV series; 112 episodes

== Sources ==
- A Word About Dr Kukrić, Lutkino bespuće, Sarajevo War Theatre (SARTR), 2005
