= Time out =

Time-out, Time Out, or timeout may refer to:

== Time ==
- Time-out (sport), in various sports, a break in play, called by a team
- Television timeout, a break in sporting action so that a commercial break may be taken
- Timeout (computing), an engineering concept
- Time-out (parenting), a parental technique for disciplining a child

== Arts ==
- Time Out (magazine), weekly listing magazines for various world cities, also the British publishing company
- Time Out (drama), a drama by Bosnian writer Zlatko Topčić
- "Timeout", an episode of the animated television series Mona the Vampire
- Time Out (Australian TV series), an Australian television series which aired 1963
- Time Out (Indian TV series), a 2017 comedy-drama mini web series

=== Music ===
- Time Out (Dave Brubeck Quartet album), 1959
- Time Out (Max Pezzali album), 2007
- "Mixtape: Time Out", a 2022 song by Stray Kids
- "Time Out", a 1974 song by Joe Walsh from So What
- "Time Out", a 2005 song by Edan from Beauty and the Beat
- "Time Out", a 2007 song by Hiromi from Time Control

=== Film ===
- Time Out (1984 film), an Estonian animated short film
- Time Out (1998 film) or Golpe de estadio, a Colombian film
- Time Out (2001 film) or l'Emploi du temps, a French film
- Time Out (2015 film), a Bollywood film
- Time Out (2023 film), a Belgian-French drama film

== Other uses ==
- Timeout (mascot), the costumed mascot of California State University, Fresno
- Time Out (chocolate bar), a brand of chocolate bar made by Cadbury
- Time Out Group, a digital and print events and entertainment company
- Game & Watch, marketed in North America as Time-Out

== See also ==
- Time Out for Smokey Robinson & The Miracles, a 1969 Motown album
- Time Out with Britney Spears, a 1999 music DVD
