= Dagmar (novel) =

Bosnian (2013) Czech language (2017)

- First edition
- Author: Zlatko Topčić
- Language: Bosnian; Czech
- Publisher: Fra Grgo Martić Foundation; For Prague; Buybook
- Publication date: 2013 (Bosnian edition); 2017 (Czech edition); 2017 (new Bosnian edition)
- Publication place: Bosnia and Herzegovina; Croatia; Czech Republic (Prague)

Dagmar is a novel by Bosnian writer Zlatko Topčić published in 2013. It received the Fra Grgo Martić Award for best book of fiction published in 2013 and the Annual Award of Writers Association of Bosnia and Herzegovina for best book published in 2013.

One critic wrote that the novel is "a great world literature" from "a great world writer". The Czech translation was published in 2017.

The story is based on e-mails of Dagmar Veškrnova-Havlova, wife of former Czech President Václav Havel, and Bosnian writer Oskar Feraget. Dagmar is a continuation of Topčić's novel The Final Word, although it also functions as an independent novel.

== Characters ==
- Oskar Feraget, Bosnian writer
- Dagmar Veškrnová-Havlova, wife of former Czech President Václav Havel
