= Refugees (drama) =

1999 drama by Bosnian writer Zlatko Topčić

- Author: Zlatko Topčić
- Language: Bosnian; English
- Publisher: Sarajevo Publishing; Intellect Ltd.
- Publication date: 1999 (Bosnian and English edition); 2013 (new English edition)
- Publication place: Bosnia and Herzegovina; United Kingdom (Bristol); United States (Chicago)

Refugees is a drama by Bosnian writer Zlatko Topčić. It is written in Bosnian and English and was published in 1999. The theater play, directed by Gradimir Gojer, was premiered the same year in Kamerni teatar 55 (Chamber Theatre 55).

The main character is Almasa, a strange woman full of unprecedented vibrations and accents.

The book Refugee Performance (2013) by Australian professor Michael Balfour, from various aspects deals with literary, and especially, drama creativity whose theme is refugee. Among eighteen authors from all over the world who testify on this subject, is Topčić.
