= Silvertown (drama) =

2016 play by Bosnian writer Zlatko Topčić

- Author: Zlatko Topčić
- Original title: Krokodil Lacoste
- Language: Bosnian; English
- Publication date: 2016 (Bosnian and English edition)
- Publication place: Bosnia and Herzegovina

Silvertown (Bosnian: Krokodil Lacoste) is a play by Bosnian writer Zlatko Topčić. It is bilingual, written in both Bosnian and English, and was published in 2016. The play performed as Krokodil Lacoste had its 2011 premiere, directed by Sulejman Kupusović, in Chamber Theater 55. It a warm reception from audiences and critics.

The drama talks about the Srebrenica tragedy through the love story of the main characters, Marija and Salih, who become victims of war circumstances in Bosnia.

Author Topčić wanted to hear the objective opinion of the jury and he did not sign his name on the text. At a press conference, he said that he wanted to tell a small story with a big topic, avoiding banalization, politicization and general places.

Topčić won the BZK Preporod Award for best dramatic text, 2010, and the Award for best contemporary text at the Theatre Games, 2011.
