= Nema problema =

Nema problema may refer to:

- Nema problema (1984 film), a Yugoslavian film
- Nema problema (2004 film), an Italian film
