= Sarajlija =

Sarajlija is the Bosnian demonym for Sarajevans. It is also found as a nickname or surname. It may refer to:

- List of Sarajevans
- Sima Milutinović Sarajlija, Serbian writer
- Mirza Sarajlija, Slovenian basketball player
- Jovan Jančić–Sarajlija, leader of Jančić's Revolt
