= Goran Gajić =

Serbian director

- Горан Гајић
- Born: 1962 (age 63–64); Zagreb, PR Croatia, Yugoslavia
- Occupations: Film, television and theater director
- Spouse: Mira Furlan (m. 1998; died 2021)
- Children: 1

Goran Gajić (Serbian Cyrillic: Горан Гајић; born 1962) is a Serbian film, television and theater director. He has directed media in English and Serbo-Croatian.

== Personal Life and Career ==
His wife was actress Mira Furlan, and they have one son, Marko Lav. In 1998, he directed his wife (playing Delenn) in And All My Dreams, Torn Asunder, an episode of Babylon 5. They were married until her death on 20 January 2021.

In 1995, he directed an award-winning adaptation of Antigone. The play was performed at Hudson Guild Theatre in Los Angeles.

He has also worked as a writer (The Seventh Day), and actor (Strangler vs. Strangler). In the 1980s he also directed Plavi Orkestar music videos for their tracks "Kad mi kažeš paša" (When You Tell Me Pasha) and "Suada" (Suada).

== Filmography ==
As director:

1. The Storks Will Return (2007–2008) – 25 episodes
2. Theater in the House – 1 episode: "Taj prokleti kutnjak" (2007)
3. The Inner Circle (2003)
4. Sheena – 2 episodes: "Treasure of Sienna Mende" (2001), "Return of the Native" (2002)
5. Oz – 2 episodes: "The Bill of Wrongs" (2000), "Revenge Is Sweet" (2001)
6. Level 9 – 1 episode: "Wetware" (2001)
7. The Beat – 1 episode: "Dark End of the Street"
8. Babylon 5 – 1 episode: "And All My Dreams, Torn Asunder" (1998)
9. Dear Video (1991)
10. There Are No Unfortunate Tourists Here (1990)
11. The Fall of Rock'n'Roll / How Rock'n'Roll was Ruined (1989) – segment "Ne šalji mi pisma"
12. Laibach: Victory Under the Sun (1988)
13. The Seventh Day (1987)
