= I Don't Like Mondays (play) =

2009 drama by Bosnian writer Zlatko Topčić

- Author: Zlatko Topčić
- Original title: Ne volim ponedjeljak
- Language: Bosnian; German
- Publisher: Der Österreichische P.E.N.—Club
- Publication date: 2010 (German edition)
- Publication place: Bosnia and Herzegovina; Austria (Vienna)

I Don't Like Mondays (Bosnian: Ne volim ponedjeljak) is a drama by Bosnian writer Zlatko Topčić. It won the PEN Austrian Center Award. Its 2009 premiere, directed by Austrian theater director Christian Papke, was performed at the International Theatre Festival MESS.

The play received good reviews from critics. In 2010 the drama was published in German by Der Österreichische P.E.N.—Club, Vienna, and was printed in over eleven thousand copies.
