= Emina Zečaj =

Bosnian singer (1929–2020)

- Born: Emina Ahmedhodžić; 17 March 1929; Sarajevo, Drina Banovina, Kingdom of Yugoslavia
- Died: 19 April 2020 (aged 91); Sarajevo, Bosnia and Herzegovina
- Resting place: Bare Cemetery, Sarajevo
- Occupation: singer
- Years active: 1962–2020
- Children: 2
- Musical career
- Genres: sevdalinka
- Instrument: vocals
- Labels: Jugoton

Emina Zečaj (née Ahmedhodžić; 17 March 1929 – 19 April 2020) was a Bosnian interpreter of the traditional folk music, sevdalinka.

Zečaj was called an "icon of traditional Bosnian music" by American Billboard magazine in 2004.

== Early life ==
Emina was born in Sarajevo's Old Town, in what is today Bosnia and Herzegovina on 17 March 1929. She was the daughter of Avdija Ahmedhodžić and his wife Melća.

== Career ==
Professor Cvjetko Rihtman, an ethnomusicologist, discovered her in the early 1960s. Following persuasion from her friends, Emina auditioned before two well-known professors, Zvonimir Nevžela and Beluš Jungić, with the folk songs Kad se jangin iz sokaka pomoli and Poranila na vodicu Zlata. Ten days later she received a phone call from Ismet Alajbegović Šerbo informing her that she had been accepted into Radio Sarajevo, beating out 30 other contestants.

Zečaj recorded music for the 2003 drama-comedy film Fuse. She also collaborated with Adi Lukovac on the soundtrack for the 2003 war film Remake (Remake - soundtrack). It was Lukovac's final project before dying in a car accident three years later.

== Death ==
Zečaj was in good health until shortly before her death at age 91. She died on the night of 19 April 2020 in her home. She had attended the funeral of Beba Selimović the previous month at Sarajevo's Bare Cemetery where she was also buried in a Muslim cemetery on 22 April 2020.

== Discography ==
- Pijana sam i bez pića (1974)
- Narodne pjesme iz Bosne (1975)
- Traditional Bosnian Songs (2003)
- Zečaj Emina (2005)
- Emina Zečaj (2008)
