= Jasna Diklić =

Bosnian theatre and film actress

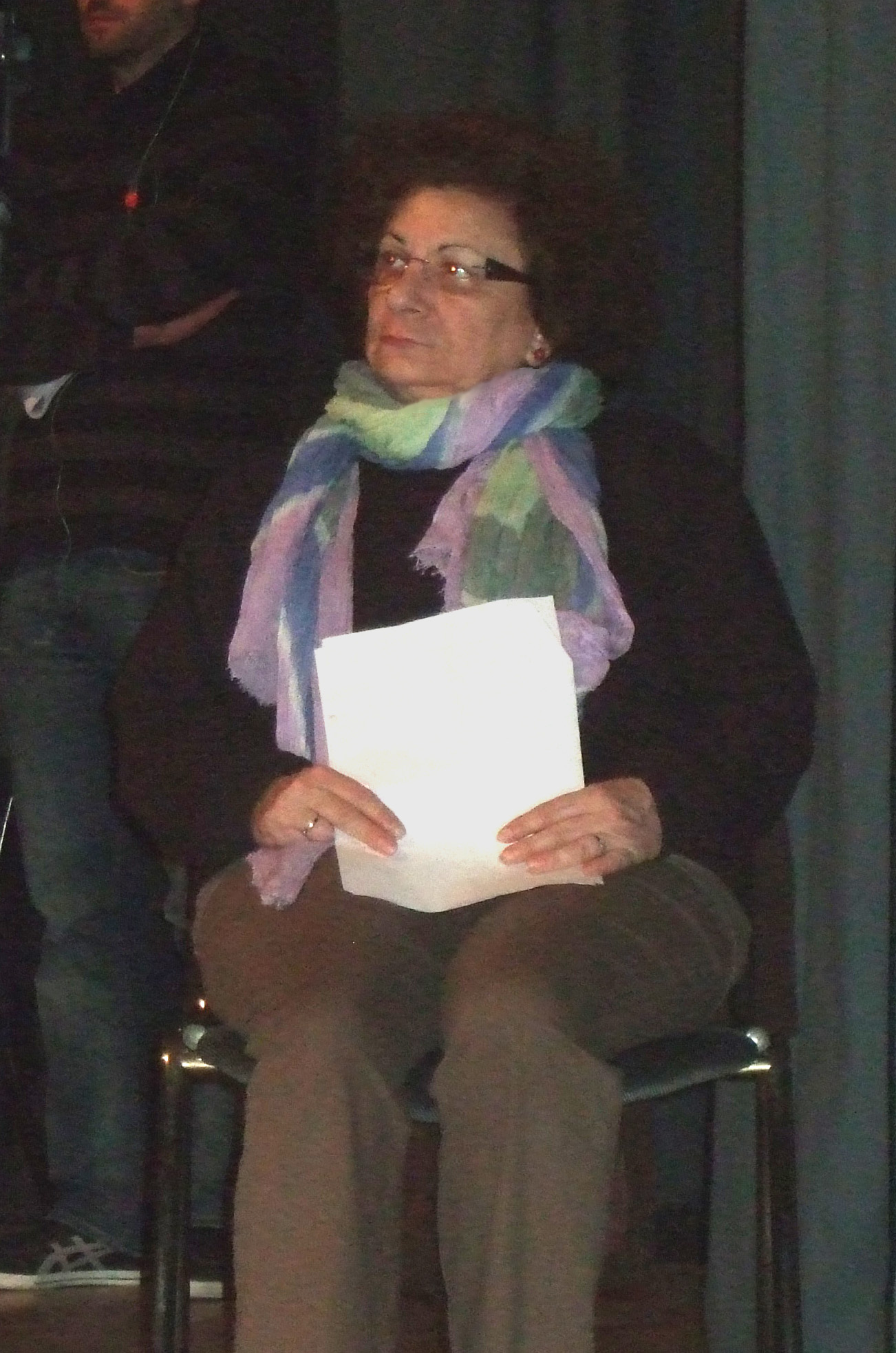
- Diklić at the Sarajevo National Theater
- Born: March 8, 1946 (age 80); Sarajevo, PR Bosnia and Herzegovina, FPR Yugoslavia
- Occupation: Actress
- Years active: 1977–present
- Children: 2

Jasna Diklić (born March 8, 1946) is a Bosnian theatre and film actress. She was born in Sarajevo. Her mother was also an actress and a puppeteer. Diklić's first theatre experiences began at MESS Festival's experimental theatre studio, after which she proceeded to study acting at the Department of Performing Arts in Sarajevo.

She was first engaged professionally by Banja Luka's National Theatre in 1969. Shortly thereafter, she was hired by a small Sarajevo theatre presently known as Kamerni Teatar 55.

She has appeared in over 150 theatre and film roles. She has won a number of awards for her roles and is one of the founders of The Sarajevo War Theatre.

In 2017, she has signed the Declaration on the Common Language of the Croats, Serbs, Bosniaks and Montenegrins.

== Filmography ==
- Kriza (TV series)
- Shanghai Gypsy
- Lud, zbunjen, normalan (TV series)
- Belvedere
- As If I Am Not There
- Krv nije voda (TV series)
- Pecat (TV series)
- Ritam zivota
- Duhovi Sarajeva
- Viza za budućnost (TV series)
- Skies Above the Landscape
- Well Tempered Corpses
- Crna hronika (TV series)
- Viza za buducnost: Novogodisnji special (TV movie)
- Fuse
- Remake
- The Pavilion (2025)
- Viza za buducnost: Novogodisnji special (TV movie)
- Strijelac (TV movie)
- The Perfect Circle
- Sarajevske price (TV series)
- Zagubljen govor (TV series)
- I Ada
- Brisani prostor (TV series)
- Vatrogasac (TV movie)
- Rascereceni (TV movie)
- Shepherd
- Udji, ako hoces
