= Bare Skin =

2004 novel by Zlatko Topčić

- Author: Zlatko Topčić
- Original title: Gola koža
- Language: Bosnian
- Publisher: Buybook
- Publication date: 2004
- Publication place: Bosnia and Herzegovina; Croatia

Bare Skin (Bosnian: Gola koža) is a bestseller novel by Zlatko Topčić, published in 2004.

Topčić also wrote the drama of the same name (2007) and the screenplay for the multiple award-winning feature film The Abandoned (2010; working title: Bare Skin), about the same theme.
