= Nightmare (Topčić novel) =

1997 Bosnian novel by Zlatko Topčić

- Author: Zlatko Topčić
- Original title: Košmar
- Language: Bosnian; Turkish; Slovenian
- Publisher: Bosanska riječ Gendas; Založba Goga
- Publication date: 1997 (Bosnian edition); 1998 (Turkish edition); 2003 (Slovenian edition)
- Publication place: Bosnia and Herzegovina; Turkey (Istanbul); Slovenia (Novo Mesto)

Nightmare (Bosnian: Košmar) is a contemporary Bosnian bestseller novel by Zlatko Topčić published in 1997.

The novel set the guidelines and became a model for other Bosnian novels. It received the prestigious Annual Award of the Association of Writers of Bosnia and Herzegovina.

It was translated into Turkish (Saray Bosna da kabus, Gendas, Istanbul, 1998) and Slovenian (Mora, Založba Goga, Novo Mesto, 2003).

== Characters ==
- Adi Solak, an intellectual, a journalist, a critic, an essayist
- Aca Nikolić, Solak's double, Chetnik Duke
