= Safet Sušić (novel) =

2007 novel by Bosnian writer Zlatko Topčić

- Author: Zlatko Topčić
- Language: Bosnian
- Publication date: 2007
- Publication place: Bosnia and Herzegovina

Safet Sušić Pape is a bestseller novel by Bosnian writer Zlatko Topčić, published in 2007.

This book is a biography in novel form of one of the world's best football players of his time, Safet Sušić. The novel caused great interest and became a hit in Bosnia and Herzegovina and France, where Sušić spent most of his career.
