= Meto Jovanovski (actor) =

Macedonian actor (1946–2023)

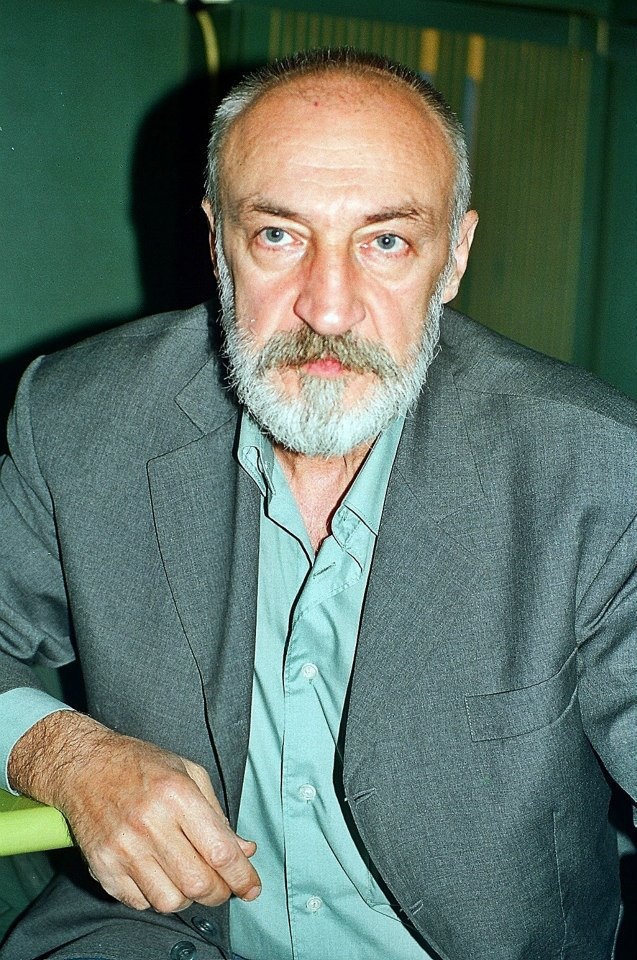
- Born: 17 January 1946; Pancarevo, PR Macedonia, FPR Yugoslavia
- Died: 16 November 2023 (aged 77)
- Occupation: Actor
- Years active: 1971–2023

Meto Jovanovski (17 January 1946 – 16 November 2023) was a Macedonian actor. He appeared in more than sixty films from 1971 onwards. Jovanovski died on 16 November 2023, at the age of 77.

== Selected filmography ==
Year	Title	Role	Notes
2025	The Pavilion		It will open 31st Sarajevo Film Festival
2024	Ruski konzul		
2023	Crveniot poet	Svestenik	
2023	Branitel	Enri Aslani	
2023	Bozicna elka	Dedo	
2022	Drzaven sluzbenik		
2022–2023	Bistra voda	Profesor	
2021	Crna svadba	Pop	
2019	Kral Petar	Vladika	
2018	Ruganje so Hristos		
2016	Osloboduvanje na Skopje		
2016	Zlatna petorka		
2015	Enklava	Milutin Arsic	
2014	The Judgement	Doctor	
2014	To the Hilt		
2014	Kum	Vladika	
2012	The Third Half	Rabbi	
2012	When Day Breaks	Mitar	
2010	The Abandoned	Gago	
2010	Mission London		
2006	The Secret Book		
2004	The Great Water	Lem	
2001	Dust		
1998	The Hornet	Avdija	
1996	Felix		
1995	Angeli na otpad		
1994	Before the Rain	Doctor	
1993	Makedonska saga		
1991	Tattoo	Ilko	
1986	Happy New Year '49		
1981	The Red Horse		
1980	Vreme vodi		
1980	Olovna prigada		
1976	Najdolgiot pat	Begalec	
1971	Makedonskiot del od pekolot	Partizan	
