= June 28, 1914 (novel) =

2019 novel by Bosnian writer Zlatko Topčić

- Second edition
- Author: Zlatko Topčić
- Original title: 28. 6. 1914.
- Language: Bosnian
- Publisher: Buybook (first edition); Planjax Group (second edition)
- Publication date: 2019 (first edition); 2021 (second edition)
- Publication place: Bosnia and Herzegovina; Croatia
- Pages: 209 (first edition); 372 (second edition)

June 28, 1914 (Bosnian: 28. 6. 1914.) is a novel by Bosnian writer Zlatko Topčić, published in 2019. The second edition was published in 2021 and won two awards; the Award of the Publishing Foundation for the best book (2021) and the 25 November Award for the book of the year (2022).

The novel deals with the Assassination of Archduke Franz Ferdinand in Sarajevo. It was presented at Bookstan, an international literary festival.
