= The Abandoned (2010 film) =

- Theatrical release poster
- Directed by: Adis Bakrač
- Written by: Zlatko Topčić
- Produced by: Almir Šahinović; Marie-Anne Coste; Zoran Tasić; Marijo Vukadin
- Starring: Tony Grga; Mira Furlan; Mirsad Tuka; Mirela Lambić; Dragan Marinković; Meto Jovanovski; Zijah Sokolović
- Cinematography: Vladan Radović
- Edited by: Michko Netchak
- Music by: Vlado Podany
- Production companies: HEFT Production; Olimp Production; Dari Films (Paris); A+D Films
- Distributed by: HEFT Production; Summer Hill Films (US)
- Release date: 8 July 2010 (45th Karlovy Vary International Film Festival)
- Running time: 88 minutes
- Countries: Bosnia and Herzegovina; Croatia; France
- Language: Bosnian
- Budget: $5 million

The Abandoned (Bosnian: Ostavljeni) is a 2010 Bosnian drama film directed by Adis Bakrač, produced by Almir Šahinović and Marie-Anne Coste. The film is a Croatian-French co-production. It stars Mira Furlan, Tony Grga, Mirsad Tuka, Mirela Lambić, Dragan Marinković, Meto Jovanovski, Zijah Sokolović, and was written by Zlatko Topčić. His script caught the attention of producers after winning the 2003 CineLink Screenwriting Competition.

The Abandoned is the story of a boy from a home for abandoned children, who tries to find out the truth about his origins, but enters into a criminal world.

The film premiered at the 45th Karlovy Vary International Film Festival on 8 July 2010. The film's US premiere was at the 2011 Santa Barbara International Film Festival. Tony Grga, who played a thirteen-year-old boy Alen, won the Golden Arena for Best Actor in a Leading Role at the 2010 Pula Film Festival.

== Plot ==
The story begins in the woods in Bosnia in 1993, when a woman gives birth to a baby boy. Then, the story jumps to 2006. The boy, Alen (Tony Grga), now thirteen, lives in a children's home in Sarajevo.

The former director of the home, Gago (Meto Jovanovski), had told Alen that his mother was French and his father was English, and that they met as war reporters in Sarajevo, but due to the war and professional obligations they had temporarily left him in the home. Alen writes letters to his mother and gives them to educator Cica (Mira Furlan), to be sent to his mother in France. However, Cica places all the letters of children in a drawer, because in reality there is no one to send them to. A new director, Mirza (Mirsad Tuka), who is a young and capable educator, comes to the home.

Near the home is a shop owned by Šento (Dragan Marinković), a criminal. For him, the children steal expensive items. After a failed jewel robbery, police investigate, and Alen worries that they will link him to the robbery. When he gains access to the police files, Alen discovers the real address of his mother, and he leaves the home to find her.

== Cast and characters ==
- Tony Grga as Alen Domić, a boy from the children's home
- Mira Furlan as Cica, an educator
- Mirsad Tuka as Mirza Alijagić, director of the home
- Mirela Lambić as Amila, Alen's mother
- Dragan Marinković as Šento, shop owner, a criminal
- Meto Jovanovski as Gago, former director of the home
- Zijah Sokolović as Muamer, Amila's husband
- Žan Marolt as a guard
- Faketa Salihbegović-Avdagić as a cook
- Ejla Tarakčija-Bavčić as Mrs. Tufekčić
- Nermin Omić as Mr. Tufekčić
- Alma Terzić as Zana, a girl from the home
- Haris Burina as Mehmed, a salesman
- Alen Goro as Muamer's son
- Ivana Petrović as Muamer's daughter
- Rijad Mašović-Riči as drug dealer
- Alija Aljović as a policeman
- Nela Dženisijević as a policewoman

== Production ==
Screenwriter Zlatko Topčić described The Abandoned as a "look at the Bosnian war through the eyes of a boy who was born not as the fruit of love, but of hatred, and is part of a whole new people, nameless and unwanted, whose mothers were raped, and the search for identity, the search for his biological parents, who, each with his or her own reasons, do not want him - him, clean, sinless, innocent in everything, uninvolved in the sins of other".

Topčić wrote the screenplay in 2002 (working title of the film: Bare Skin). Later, he wrote the bestseller novel Bare Skin (2004) and the drama of the same name (2007), about the same theme.

=== Filming ===
Filming took place in Sarajevo and many other locations. Principal photography began in 2007.

== Release ==
The Abandoned was released worldwide on 8 July 2010, by HEFT Production and Summer Hill Films (US). It was released to cinemas throughout Bosnia and Herzegovina on 7 December 2010.

== Music ==
Musician Vlado Podany worked on the soundtrack for the film.

== Accolades ==
List of accolades
Film Festival	Year of ceremony	Category	Recipient(s)	Result	Ref(s)
Hollywood Film Festival	2011	Global Grand Jury Prize	The Abandoned	Won	
Hollywood Film Festival	2011	Best Screenplay	Zlatko Topčić	Won	
SEE A Paris Film Festival	2011	Best Director	Adis Bakrač	Won	
Festróia - Tróia International Film Festival	2011	Jury Special Prize for Best First Feature	Adis Bakrač	Won	
Pula Film Festival	2010	Golden Arena for Best Actor in a Leading Role	Tony Grga	Won	
Pula Film Festival	2010	FEDEORA Award	The Abandoned	Won	
Cinema City International Film Festival	2011	Special Prize FIPRESCI	Adis Bakrač	Won	
Transilvania International Film Festival	2011	Best Screenplay	Zlatko Topčić	Won	
Santa Barbara International Film Festival	2011	Jury Prize	The Abandoned	Nominated	
St. Louis International Film Festival	2013	Best Film	The Abandoned	Nominated	
Ex-YU Fest	2011	Best Film	The Abandoned	Won	
Balkan New Film Festival	2013	Jury Award for Best Actress in a Leading Role	Mira Furlan	Won	
Haifa International Film Festival	2010	Golden Anchor Award	The Abandoned	Nominated	
Karlovy Vary International Film Festival	2010	East of West Award	The Abandoned	Nominated	
Sarajevo Film Festival	2003	CineLink/Work-in-Progress Award - Best Screenplay	Zlatko Topčić	Won	
Amiens International Film Festival	2010	Golden Unicorn	The Abandoned	Nominated	
Ljubljana International Film Festival	2010	Kingfisher Award	The Abandoned	Nominated	
Alexandria International Film Festival	2011	Best Film	The Abandoned	Nominated	
Golden Carpathian Film Festival	2011	Best Screenplay	Zlatko Topčić	Won	

== Reception ==
=== Critical response ===
The film garnered positive reviews. The Hollywood Reporter called it the "unique artistic film". Alissa Simon of Variety praised the film emphasizing that it calls attention to "the plight of children born of rape during the war in Bosnia-Herzegovina", but described it as a "well-meaning but overdone melodrama".

Fedeora penned a glowing review and wrote that "the film succeeds in being both a touching personal story but also a trenchant comment on the Bosnian war". On AllMovie, it has a perfect score of 5 out of 5 stars.

At the 2011 Santa Barbara International Film Festival, film critic Demi Mellett said: "The director does a great job at keeping the audience enthralled in what is going on throughout the whole film. The whole movie had a overtone of gray which showed how Alen was not happy because he couldn’t figure out where his mother was. The colors, gray shade of the film, and editing all brought it together, making the film work perfectly. All in all, I really enjoyed this film and would suggest it to anyone. The angles and music choice used in The Abandoned stood out to me. The story line was intriguing and the acting was done very well".

The film's world premiere was at the 45th Karlovy Vary International Film Festival, where it received a 15-minute standing ovation.

=== International festival circuit ===
The Abandoned was screened at over 80 international film festivals around the world, including the Pula Film Festival, Amiens International Film Festival, SEE a Paris Film Festival, Haifa International Film Festival, Festróia - Tróia International Film Festival, Alexandria International Film Festival, Hollywood Film Festival, Transilvania International Film Festival, Ljubljana International Film Festival, Karlovy Vary International Film Festival, Santa Barbara International Film Festival, St. Louis International Film Festival, and many other.

It was screened at festivals in the Czech Republic, Portugal, Romania, Slovenia, Sweden, Israel, Croatia, Egypt, France, Serbia and the United States.

== See also ==
- List of Bosnia and Herzegovina films
