= Remake (soundtrack) =

Soundtrack album by Adi Lukovac feat. Emina Zečaj
- Released: 2003
- Genre: Soundtrack
- Length: 29:24
- Label: Gramofon

Professional ratings
Review scores
Source	Rating
AllMusic	5/5 stars
Filmtracks	5/5 stars

Remake is the soundtrack from the film of the same name, released in 2003 by Gramofon. Unless noted, the cues were composed by Adi Lukovac feat. Emina Zečaj. The song Il' je vedro, il' oblačno is sung by Mario Drmać, who performed it in the film as character Remzo.

It is the best-selling movie soundtrack of ex-YU cinema and one of the best-selling movie soundtracks of European cinema.

== Track listing ==
All tracks are written by Adi Lukovac

No.	Title	Length
1.	"Remaquiem"	4:11
2.	"Il' je vedro, il' oblačno"	3:13
3.	"Istihare"	4:07
4.	"Tema No. 2"	4:03
5.	"Welcome"	3:24
6.	"Odlazak"	5:00
7.	"Hazurila"	5:26
