= Miracle in Bosnia =

- Film poster
- Directed by: Dino Mustafić; Danis Tanović
- Written by: Zlatko Topčić
- Produced by: Edin Lonić; Smail Tokić
- Cinematography: Hakija Topić
- Edited by: Fadil Komarica
- Music by: Fadil Komarica
- Production company: FAOS
- Distributed by: FAOS
- Release date: 18 May 1995 (Cannes)
- Running time: 52 minutes
- Country: Bosnia and Herzegovina
- Language: Bosnian

Miracle in Bosnia (Bosnian: Čudo u Bosni) is a 1995 Bosnian documentary film directed by Dino Mustafić and Danis Tanović, written by Zlatko Topčić, produced by Edin Lonić and Smail Tokić.

It won the Special Award at the 1995 Cannes Film Festival.

== Plot and theme ==
A documentary film shot on the occasion of the third anniversary of Army of the Republic of Bosnia and Herzegovina. Combining documentary materials with narrative, the film shows an evolution of the Bosnian Army, from small units, as it was at the beginning of the war, to military formations at the end of the third year of the war.

== Production ==
The film was shot during the Bosnian War.

== Release and screenings ==
During 1995 and 1996, it was screened at over 20 international film festivals: Cannes Film Festival, Venice Film Festival, Berlin International Film Festival, International Film Festival Rotterdam, Karlovy Vary International Film Festival, Toronto International Film Festival, Locarno Festival, New York Film Festival, Los Angeles Film Festival, International Documentary Film Festival Amsterdam, and many other.

== Reception ==
Miracle in Bosnia garnered positive reviews by audiences and critics. It received a 15 minute standing ovation at the 1995 Cannes Film Festival. Film critics from The New York Times and Los Angeles Times praised the film.

== See also ==
- List of Bosnia and Herzegovina films
