= Mira Furlan =

Croatian-American actress and singer (1955–2021)

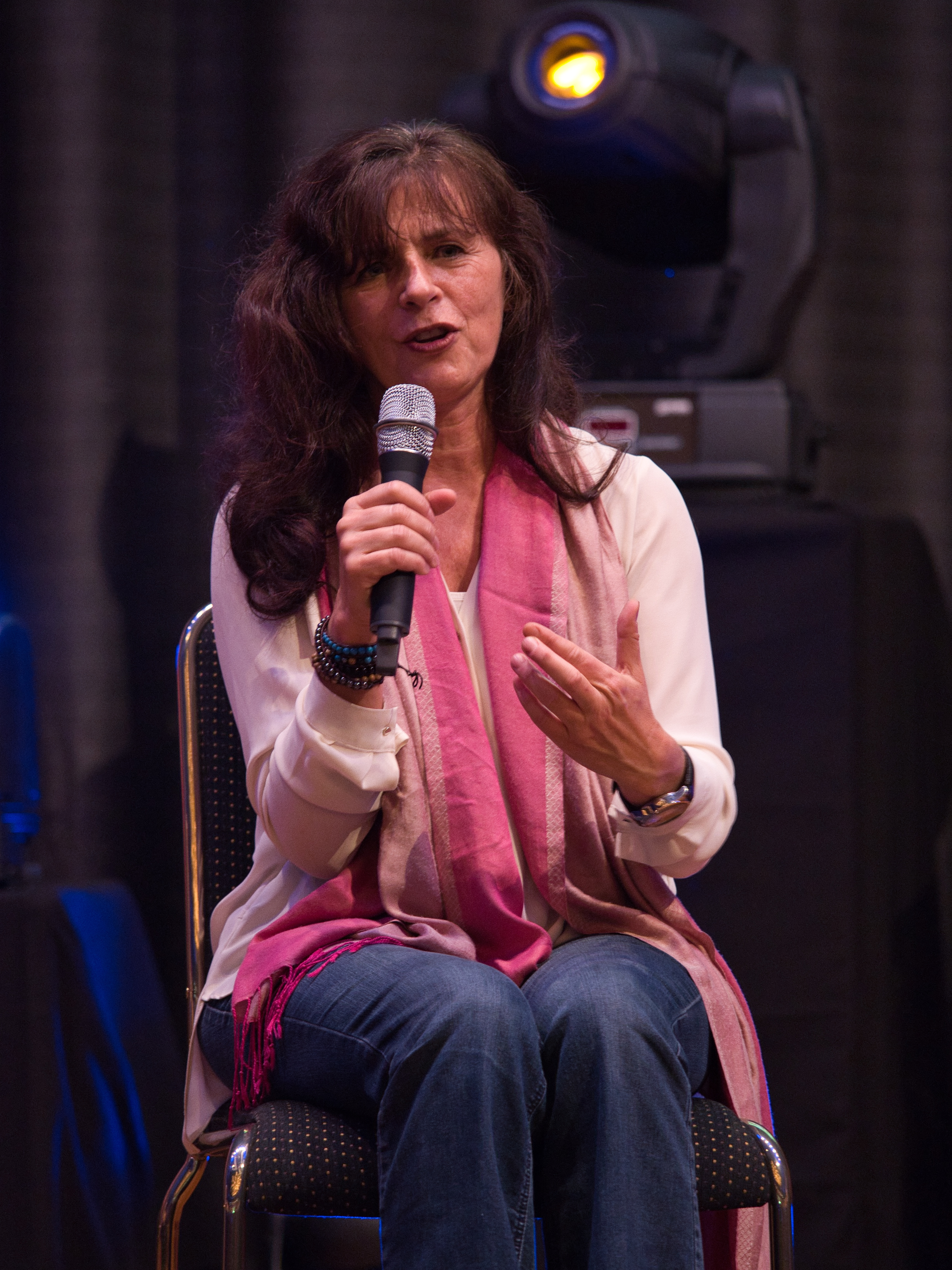
- Furlan in 2019
- Born: 7 September 1955; Zagreb, PR Croatia, Yugoslavia
- Died: 20 January 2021 (aged 65); Los Angeles, California, U.S.
- Citizenship: United States; Croatia
- Occupations: Actress; singer
- Years active: 1976–2021
- Spouse: Goran Gajić (m. 1998)
- Children: 1
- Parents: Ivan Furlan; Branka Weil
- Website: www.mirafurlan.net

Mira Furlan (7 September 1955 – 20 January 2021) was a Croatian-American actress and singer. Internationally, she was best known for her roles as the Minbari Ambassador Delenn in the science fiction television series Babylon 5 (1993–1998), and as Danielle Rousseau in Lost (2004–2010), and also appeared in multiple award-winning films such as When Father Was Away on Business (1985) and The Abandoned (2010).

== Early life ==
Furlan was born on 7 September 1955 to an intellectual and academic family that included a large number of university professors in Zagreb, PR Croatia, which at the time was one of the six constituent republics of Yugoslavia. She was born to Branka Weil, a mother who was of Jewish-Serbian descent, and Ivan Furlan, a father of Slovene-Furlan descent.

As a child, Furlan was obsessed with American rock and roll music. She became interested in acting as a teenager.

Furlan graduated from the Academy for Dramatic Arts in Zagreb with Bachelor of Fine Arts in theatre. Simultaneously, she took language classes at the university's Faculty of Humanities and Social Sciences, becoming fluent in English, German, and French.

== Career ==
=== Acting ===
Furlan was a member of the Croatian National Theatre in Zagreb and frequently appeared in Yugoslav television and films. She played Ankica Vidmar in the film When Father Was Away on Business, which won the Palme d'Or at the 1985 Cannes Film Festival and was nominated for the Academy Award for Best Foreign Language Film. In the late 1980s, she performed in theater productions in both Zagreb and Belgrade.

Furlan became a member of the Actors Studio in 1992 after moving to New York City to flee turmoil in Yugoslavia. Later that year, her theater contacts in the U.S. helped her get the necessary work permits to perform with the Indiana Repertory Theatre as the lead role in Yerma.

She appeared on the stage in New York City and Los Angeles. She played the central ensemble role of Minbari Ambassador Delenn for all five seasons of Babylon 5 and some of the associated TV movies. Between 2004 and 2010, she played the recurring role of Danielle Rousseau on Lost. In 2009, she appeared on an episode of NCIS, titled "South By Southwest".

In 2002, she returned to Croatia after eleven years to take the lead role in Rade Šerbedžija's Ulysses Theatre Company's production of Euripides' Medea.

=== Singing ===
In the 1980s, Furlan briefly appeared as singer for Le Cinema, a spin-off from the rock band, Film. She was also featured as a vocalist on two tracks on the 1983 album, "Nevino srce" ("Innocent Heart") by Slovenian rock band, Buldožer. In 1998, she released an album, Songs From Movies That Have Never Been Made.

Furlan also sang in the band, The Be Five, which produced a single album in 1998, Trying to Forget.

=== Writing ===
Furlan wrote the play Until Death Do Us Part (Croatian: Dok nas smrt ne razdvoji), which is set in 1970s Zagreb. A collection of her columns in the now-defunct Croatian magazine Feral Tribune was published as the book Totalna rasprodaja in 2010. Furlan chose to write her autobiography in English: Love Me More than Anything in the World: Stories about Belonging. The book is not only a self-portrait of the actress, but also a picture of the disintegration of the Yugoslavian country and its moral values.

== Personal life ==
Furlan's husband was director Goran Gajić, who is an ethnic Serb. He directed her in an episode of Babylon 5 and in several plays, including a production of Sophocles' Antigone.

Furlan was active in the Yugoslav feminist movement in the 1980s.

Twice a month during the late 1980s, Furlan made the three-hour commute between Zagreb and Belgrade, where her husband was based, to act in theatre productions in both cities. After the Croatian War of Independence began in 1991, she was fired by the Croatian National Theatre for refusing to quit acting in a Belgrade theatre production. An ensuing public smear campaign turned her colleagues and friends against her as she received threatening messages on her answering machine. Furlan wrote a public letter expressing her deep disappointment over the behaviour of her fellow citizens and colleagues and the threats of the nationalists against her. The couple left in November 1991, in the early days of the breakup of Yugoslavia, emigrating to New York City.

Furlan gave birth to the couple's only child, Marko Lav, in 1998.

== Death ==
Furlan died at her home in Los Angeles on 20 January 2021, at the age of 65, having suffered from complications of West Nile fever in the time leading up to her death. Upon her death, theater director Ivica Buljan of the Croatian National Theater issued an apology on behalf of the theater for their treatment of Furlan in the early 1990s. A week later, Croatian weekly Globus issued another apology for publishing three feuilletons attacking the actress in 1992 that had an essential role in the public-smear campaign.

== Awards ==
- 1982 Pula Film Festival Golden Arena award for Best Supporting Actress in the film Cyclops.
- 1986 Pula Film Festival Golden Arena award for Best Actress in The Beauty of Vice.
- 1990 Dubravko Dujšin Award
- 2013 Balkan New Film Festival Jury Award for Best Actress in The Abandoned.

== Selected filmography ==
Film
Year	Title	Role	Notes	Ref
1985	Horvatov izbor	Eva Horvatek		
1985	When Father Was Away on Business	Ankica Vidmar		
1986	The Beauty of Vice	Jaglika		
1988	Brothers by Mother	Vranka		
1988	El Camino del Sur	Bessi		
2008	The Tour	Sonja		
2010	Cirkus Columbia	Lucija		
2010	The Abandoned	Cica		
2013	Twice Born	Velida		
2014	With Mum	Jasna		
2020	Pred nama	Jovana	Short	
2021	Burning at Both Ends	Agnes	Posthumous release	
2021	SAVA	Sava (voice)		
2024	Space Command Redemption	Vonn Odara		

TV
Year	Title	Role	Notes	Ref
1990–1991	Bolji život	Finka Pašalić	Guest: 8 episodes	
1993–1998	Babylon 5	Delenn	Main role	
1997	Spider-Man: The Animated Series	Silver Sable	voice	
2004–2010	Lost	Danielle Rousseau	Recurring Role (Season 1–4); Guest (Season 6): 22 episodes	
2008	Vratiće se rode	Jagoda	Guest: 8 episodes	
2009	NCIS	Dina Risi	"South by Southwest", Season 6, Episode 17	
2010	Najbolje godine	Violeta	Guest (Season 2): 25 episodes	
2016	Vere i zavere	Lizaveta Rudić	Main role: 12 episodes	
2016–2017	Just Add Magic	The Traveller	6 episodes	
2020	Just Add Magic: Mystery City	The Traveller	"Just Add Volume"	
2020	Space Command	Vonn Odara/Evelynn 'Vonn' Odara	5 episodes	
2021	Arcane	Babette	Voice; posthumous release	

Video Games
Year	Title	Role	Notes
2015	Payday 2	The Butcher	Voice and likeness, also appeared in live action trailer
2020	Beyond Blue	Irina	
2020	Mafia: Definitive Edition	Additional Voices	
