= Overture (novel) =

2018 novel by Bosnian writer Zlatko Topčić

- First edition
- Author: Zlatko Topčić
- Original title: Uvertira
- Language: Bosnian
- Genre: picaresque novel thriller
- Publisher: Buybook
- Publication date: 2018
- Publication place: Bosnia and Herzegovina; Croatia
- Pages: 190

Overture (Bosnian: Uvertira) is a bestseller thriller–picaresque novel by Bosnian writer Zlatko Topčić, published in 2018.

It was presented at Bookstan, an international literary festival. Critics said that the novel is "great and multi-layered, bringing the story of art and suffering and their painful interwovenness".

== Characters ==
- Abdulah Veladar
