= Viza za budućnost =

- Season 2 poster
- Genre: Comedy; Drama; Family
- Created by: Sulejman Kupusović
- Written by: Hasan Džafić; Almir Imširević
- Directed by: Sulejman Kupusović; Vojislav Milašević; Nedžad Begović; Admir Glamočak; Faruk Sokolović
- Starring: Nada Đurevska; Ljubiša Samardžić; Jasna Diklić; Admir Glamočak; Meliha Fakić; Mirvad Kurić; Zoran Bečić; Izudin Bajrović; Minka Muftić; Drago Buka; Sanja Burić; Boro Stjepanović; Tanja Bošković; Amra Kapidžić; Ermin Sijamija; Enis Bešlagić; Žan Marolt
- Country of origin: Bosnia and Herzegovina
- Original language: Bosnian
- No. of seasons: 6
- No. of episodes: 206

Production
- Executive producers: Šuhreta Duda Sokolović; Faruk Sokolović
- Producer: Jasmin Duraković
- Production location: Sarajevo
- Running time: 35 minutes
- Production company: Mebius Film

Original release
- Network: FTV
- Release: September 22, 2002 – April 17, 2008

Viza za budućnost (lit. 'Visa for the Future') was the first post-independence Bosnian TV series. Production started on 22 June 2002, in Sarajevo, Bosnia and Herzegovina. The first episode aired on 22 September 2002. The final episode was broadcast on 17 April 2008.

Viza za budućnost eventually became one of the region's most popular sitcoms.

== History ==
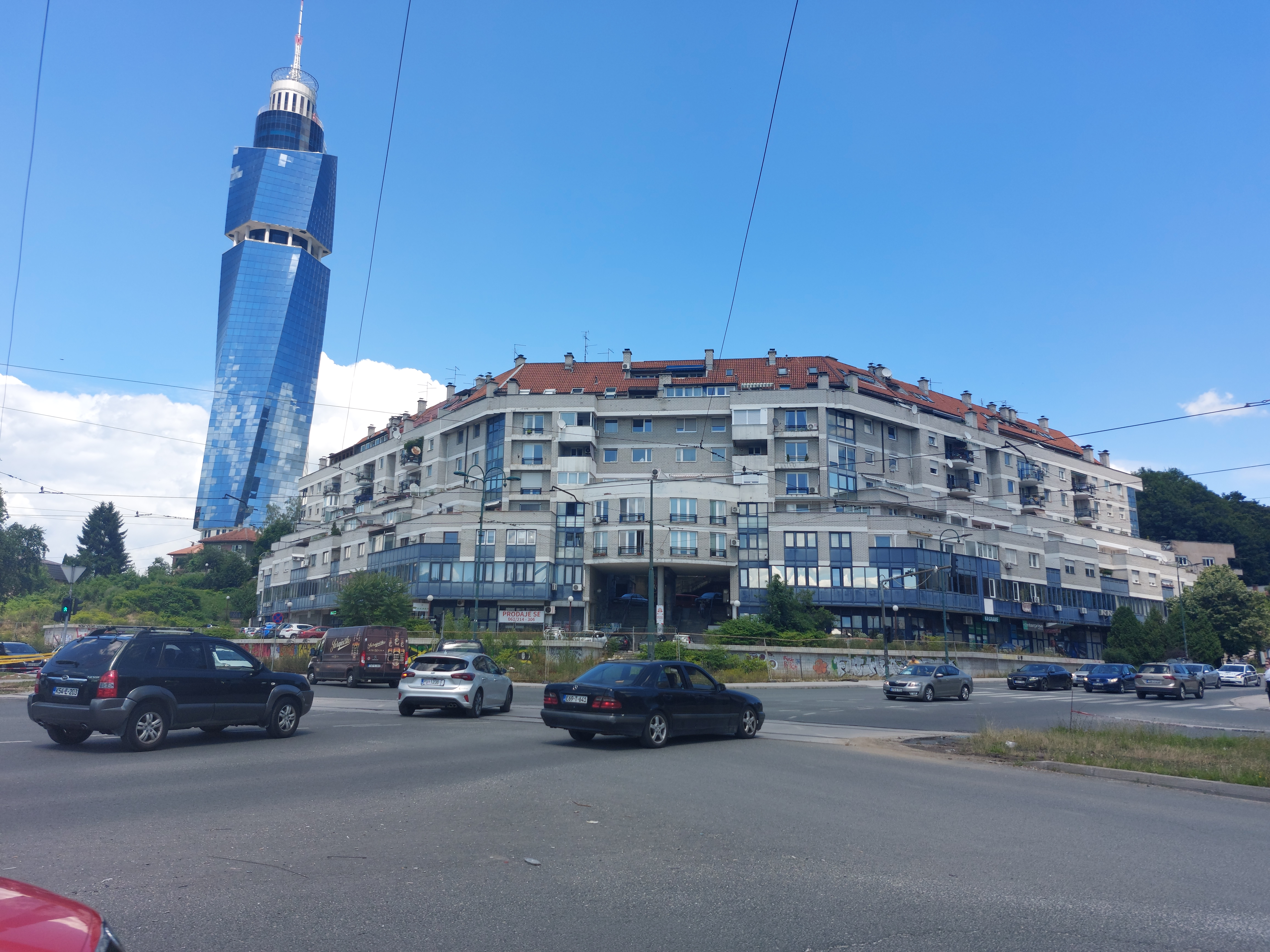
The building in Sarajevo where the series was filmed

Viza za budućnost began airing on 22 September 2002 on FTV. The series has got 206 episodes, divided into 6 seasons. The series also aired in Serbia (RTS 1 and Pink), Montenegro (TVCG 1 and TV Vijesti), Macedonia (A1) and Slovenia (TV SLO 2).

After episode 206, which was broadcast on 17 April 2008, there was an announcement of the next episode. Episode 207 was supposed to air in Autumn 2008. However, it never aired, and the series abruptly ended with no finale.

== Series overview ==
| Season | Episodes | Originally released | |
| Season | Episodes | First released | Last released |
|---|---|---|---|
| 1 | 44 | September 22, 2002 | July 20, 2003 |
| 2 | 37 | September 21, 2003 | May 30, 2004 |
| 3 | 19 | September 19, 2004 | January 30, 2005 |
| 4 | 42 | September 11, 2005 | July 2, 2006 |
| 5 | 34 | September 17, 2006 | May 20, 2007 |
| 6 | 30 | September 20, 2007 | April 17, 2008 |

== Plot ==
The Bosniak family Husika, whose apartment was destroyed in the war, lives in an apartment of the Serb family Golijanin who left Sarajevo and emigrated to Norway. The drama begins when th Golijanine family comes back from Norway to Sarajevo because of nostalgia and want their apartment back. The Husika family doesn't want to leave the apartment until they get a new one, and they don't want to let the Golijanins in. However, neither the Golijanins want to give up, with both families ending up in a court dispute. On the day of the Husika's eviction, a court decision is reached that two families must live together.

== Cast ==
- Nada Đurevska as Mubera Polovina
- Ljubiša Samardžić as Milan Golijanin
- Jasna Diklić as Danica Golijanin
- Admir Glamočak as Suad Husika
- Meliha Fakić as Alma Husika
- Mirvad Kurić as Rifat 'Rile' Polovina
- Zoran Bečić as Oskar Prohaska
- Amra Kapidžić as Belma Husika
- Izudin Bajrović as Miro Zvrk
- Emina Muftić as Sena Zvrk
- Riad Ljutović as Tonči
- Žan Marolt as Hrvoje Uskok
- Sanda Krgo as Sanja
- Lejla Zvizdić as Merima Husika
- Maja Ibrahimpašić as Nejra Husika
- Boris Dvornik as Vinko Uskok
- Enis Bešlagić as Zela
- Ermin Sijamija as Sabahudin Kreljo
- Emir Hadžihafizbegović as Nadir Hadžić
- Tanja Bošković as Sofija Jović
- Boro Stjepanović as Aleksandar Jović
- Sanja Burić as Dijana
- Mario Drmać as Nenad Golijanin
- Drago Buka as Nero
