= Remake (2003 film) =

- Theatrical release poster
- Directed by: Dino Mustafić
- Written by: Zlatko Topčić
- Produced by: Enes Cviko; Martine de Clermont-Tonnerre
- Starring: Ermin Bravo; Aleksandar Seksan; Ermin Sijamija; Dejan Aćimović; Lucija Šerbedžija; Emir Hadžihafizbegović; Miraj Grbić; François Berléand; Évelyne Bouix
- Cinematography: Mustafa Mustafić
- Edited by: Andrija Zafranović
- Music by: Adi Lukovac
- Production companies: Forum; MACT Productions (Paris); TRT
- Distributed by: Forum; Terra Entertainment Inc. (US)
- Release date: 23 January 2003 (International Film Festival Rotterdam)
- Running time: 108 minutes
- Countries: Bosnia and Herzegovina; France; Turkey
- Languages: Bosnian; Croatian; Serbian; French; English
- Budget: $20 million

Remake is a 2003 Bosnian war film directed by Dino Mustafić, and produced by Enes Cviko and Martine de Clermont-Tonnerre. The film is a Turkish-French co-production.

The film stars Ermin Bravo, Aleksandar Seksan, Ermin Sijamija, Dejan Aćimović, Lucija Šerbedžija, Emir Hadžihafizbegović, Miraj Grbić, François Berléand, Évelyne Bouix, and was written by Zlatko Topčić (based on incidents which occurred in his life).

Remake tells the parallel coming-of-age stories of a father living in Sarajevo during World War II and his son living through the Siege of Sarajevo during the Bosnian War.

The film premiered at the 32nd International Film Festival Rotterdam on January 23, 2003. The film's US premiere was at the 2004 Wine Country Film Festival (San Francisco), where it won three awards: Best First Feature, Best Actor (Bravo) and Award for Peace and Cultural Understanding. It won a Special Mention Award at the 53rd Berlin International Film Festival.

== Plot and theme ==
In the early 1990s, Tarik is a young Sarajevan just starting out as a writer. Before the onset of war in the former Yugoslavia, he sends a screenplay to a literary competition in France.

In a parallel plot, we see the dramatization of his script: a true story of his father Ahmed Karaga, who is unprepared for the outbreak of World War II and ends up in a concentration camp, but manages to survive. In the present plot, Ahmed's drama is almost identically replayed in the fate of Tarik. Only the era and the conditions of suffering have changed.

In Sarajevo, Tarik is captured by the Serbian Army and is subjected to the cruel conditions of a labour camp, which differs little from a concentration camp. After an unsuccessful attempt to escape, a famous French film producer helps exchange Tarik for another prisoner and ensures transportation to Paris.

There, where few know of the great tragedy that has struck Bosnia, he meets one of his tormentors.

The film explores the theme of revenge versus forgiveness, as well as the idea that history repeats itself and that those who do not learn from it are doomed to repeat it.

Remake is also a coming-of-age drama, with scenes in which Ahmed and Tarik go out with their friends, have fun, fall in love.

== Cast and characters ==
- Ermin Bravo as Tarik Karaga
- Aleksandar Seksan as Miro Jovanović, Tarik's best friend
- Miralem Zupčević as Ahmed Karaga, Tarik's father
- Ermin Sijamija as the younger version of Ahmed
- Dejan Aćimović as Duke Mišo, one of the commanders of the local Serbian forces and Tarik's neighbor
- Lucija Šerbedžija as Eva Bebek, Ahmed's girlfriend from his youth
- Slaven Knezović as Marko Kalaba, Ahmed's friend
- Helena Minić as Alma Dizdarević, Tarik's girlfriend
- Jasna Diklić as Desa Jovanović, Miro's mother
- Zijah Sokolović as Mirsad Alihodžić "Hodža", a Bosnian refugee in France, war profiteer
- François Berléand as Francois-Charles Leconte, producer
- Évelyne Bouix as Katrin Leconte, producer's wife
- Haris Begović as Adis Dizdarević, Alma's younger brother
- Izudin Bajrović as Jovo, Serbian soldier
- Emir Hadžihafizbegović as Željko, Serbian guard
- Admir Glamočak as an interrogator, investigator, Ustasha
- Mario Drmać as Remzo, a singer from the camp
- Miraj Grbić as Mitar, Serbian guard
- Mirsad Tuka as Vaso, Serbian soldier
- Mirza Tanović as French UN officer
- Rade Čolović as Zoka, Serbian guard
- Jasmin Mekić as Miki, Serbian soldier
- Mirvad Kurić as Salko, captive
- Tahir Nikšić as Vlado, captive
- Nakib Abdagić as Zijo Bajrić, captive
- Edhem Husić as Meho Mizić, captive
- Božo Bunjevac as Avdo Ligata, captive
- Vlado Kerošević as major
- Alen Muratović as Džemo, illegal
- Tatjana Šojić as announcer
- Vlado Jokanović as clergyman
- Bojan Trišić as gutterman
- Aldin Zulić as Don Dragiša de la Kuvelja
- Boris Balta as Ustasha

== Production ==
Remake is the first feature film directed by Dino Mustafić and the first written by Zlatko Topčić. Mustafić said in an interview: "We need a cathartic films that talk about our recent past. They are just as important as a testimony to the evil and stupidity of war does not happen again." Topčić said: "The script is devoid of ideological and daily political tinge. This movie wants to be a movie of love, not hate."

The film's script was published in 2002.

=== Filming ===
Filming took place in Paris, Sarajevo and other locations. Principal photography began in 2001.

== Release ==
The film was released worldwide on January 23, 2003, by Forum Sarajevo and Terra Entertainment Inc. It was released in Bosnia and Herzegovina on February 22, 2003.

== Music ==
Musician Adi Lukovac and singer Emina Zečaj collaborated on the soundtrack for the film.

== Accolades ==
List of accolades
| Film festival | Year of ceremony | Category | Recipient(s) | Result | Ref(s) |
|---|---|---|---|---|---|
| Berlin International Film Festival | 2003 | Special Mention | Remake | Won | |
| Festival du Film de Paris | 2003 | Grand Prix | Remake | Nominated | |
| International Film Festival Rotterdam | 2003 | Tiger Award | Remake | Nominated | |
| Filmfest München | 2003 | One Future Prize - Honorable Mention | Remake | Won | |
| Karlovy Vary International Film Festival | 2003 | East of West Award | Remake | Nominated | |
| International Istanbul Film Festival | 2003 | Golden Tulip | Remake | Nominated | |
| Wine Country Film Festival | 2004 | Award for Peace and Cultural Understanding | Remake | Won | |
| Wine Country Film Festival | 2004 | Best First Feature | Dino Mustafić | Won | |
| Wine Country Film Festival | 2004 | Best Actor | Ermin Bravo | Won | |

== Reception ==
=== Box office ===
Remake was a box office hit. It is the most watched film in its native country ever.

=== Critical response ===
Ronald Holloway of Kino-German Film & International Reports wrote that "Remake should not be missed". Also, he called it "a major film event of 2003". Deborah Young, in Variety, remarked that the film "is long on narrative but short on original insight into Balkan history".

The film's world premiere was at the 32nd International Film Festival Rotterdam, where a critic said that Remake is a "very brave film, describing the situation as it was" and emphasized that "the restrained acting, the flowing transitions between the flashbacks and the clever cutting make Remake into a penetrating film experience". It was the most watched film of the festival and received a 20 minute standing ovation.

Some critics specifically praised the cult scene in which actor Mario Drmać sings a traditional folk song "Il' je vedro, il' oblačno". On Filmski.net, the film has a score of 5 out of 5 stars. MukMag rated Remake as one of the best films of ex-Socialist Federal Republic of Yugoslavia cinema.

=== International festival circuit ===
The film was screened at over 100 international film festivals around the world, including the Festival du Film de Paris, New York Film Festival, Los Angeles Film Festival, Tribeca Film Festival, Locarno Festival, Warsaw International Film Festival, International Film Festival Rotterdam, Berlin International Film Festival, Rome Film Festival, BFI London Film Festival, Gothenburg Film Festival, FEST, Salerno International Film Festival, Sydney Film Festival, Tokyo International Film Festival, Valencia International Film Festival Cinema Jove, Toronto International Film Festival, Sofia International Film Festival, Transilvania International Film Festival, São Paulo International Film Festival, Houston Cinema Arts Festival, Monaco International Film Festival, International Istanbul Film Festival, Montreal World Film Festival, Filmfest München, Prague International Film Festival - Febiofest, Karlovy Vary International Film Festival, Wine Country Film Festival, Cleveland International Film Festival, Sarajevo Film Festival, and many others.

It was screened at festivals in the Netherlands, Poland, Croatia, Serbia, France, Italy, United Kingdom, Sweden, Canada, Bulgaria, Romania, Brazil, Australia, Japan, Turkey, Spain, Monaco, Germany, the Czech Republic and the United States. It was also premiered on TV in the United States and Hungary.

== See also ==
- List of Bosnia and Herzegovina films
- List of cult films
- List of films set in Paris
