= Sarajevo War Theatre =

Theatre in Sarajevo, Bosnia and Herzegovina

Sarajevo War Theatre (SARTR)
- Sarajevo War Theatre logo
- Interactive map of Sarajevo War Theatre (SARTR)
- Address: Gabelina 16, 71000; Sarajevo; Bosnia and Herzegovina
- Coordinates: 43°51′48.78″N 18°24′54.86″E

Construction
- Opened: 17 May 1992

Website
- www.sartr.ba

The Sarajevo War Theatre (Bosnian: Sarajevski ratni teatar / Сарајевски ратни театар, SARTR) is a theatre in Sarajevo, Bosnia and Herzegovina. It was founded on 17 May 1992 on the initiative of Dubravko Bibanović, Gradimir Gojer, Đorđe Mačkić and Safet Plakalo during the Siege of Sarajevo. It was a gathering place for theatre professionals and Academy of Performing Arts students for the duration of the war. Today, it is a commercial theatre and the premium experimental showcase in Bosnia and Herzegovina. It is one of the venues for the MESS International Theatre Festival and the sole venue for the Open University of Sarajevo.

== History ==
With the start of the Siege of Sarajevo the city's cultural life was dramatically halted. Actors and associates of the three existing professional theatres in Sarajevo, which had ceased all activities at the beginning of the Bosnian war, gathered around the concept of an ad-hoc war-time experimental theatre. After SARTR was established they proceeded to give numerous performances during the four years of siege. The theatre was formed around a grass roots concept of showcasing anti-war pieces that were often directed by students of the Academy of Performing Arts.

In January 1993, SARTR was officially recognised by the Sarajevo City Assembly as a public institution of special significance for the defence of Sarajevo. SARTR's founding director, Safet Plakalo, has often spoken of SARTR as Sarajevo's spiritual weapon against the surrealism of war, summarising its charter in the catch-cry Theatre Against Death. The theatre's first war-time production The Shelter (Bosnian: Sklonište), written by Safet Plakalo and Dubravko Bibanović, premiered on September 6, 1992. Headlined by the acclaimed Bosnian actors Jasna Diklić, Zoran Bečić, Miodrag Trifunov, Senad Bašić, Nebojša Veljović, Branko Ličen, Irena Mulamuhić, Alija Aljović and Nisveta Omerbašić, it was performed 97 times during the 1992-1996 siege achieving legendary status. Only one other production would surpass The Shelter's importance in the history of the theatre: a play about the Spanish Civil War. ¡Ay Carmela!, written by the Spanish playwright José Sanchis Sinisterra, was premiered in 1999, and would occupy the theatre's 'most popular' slot for the next twenty-two years.

SARTR was the first Bosnian theatre to leave the country during the war and showcase its productions abroad, visiting the Avignon Festival in 1994.

With the end of the conflict, SARTR continued operating as a nascent theatre. In 1997, SARTR was incorporated as a public institution in the Sarajevo Canton. A new team of young theatre professionals, led by Nihad Kreševljaković (2011-2015) and Aleš Kurt (2016-2021), spearheaded SARTR's programmatic expansion, increasing its popularity and reach. Apart from having a professional weekly programme, the theatre still showcases student productions from the Academy of Performing Arts and hosts numerous festivals and socially engaged projects such as the Open University of Sarajevo. In 2003 the theatre received the Sixth April Award of Sarajevo - the highest decoration given by the city. Despite limited resources, SARTR is today a successful professional theatre company with a number of international co-productions, appearances and awards under its belt.

== Gallery ==
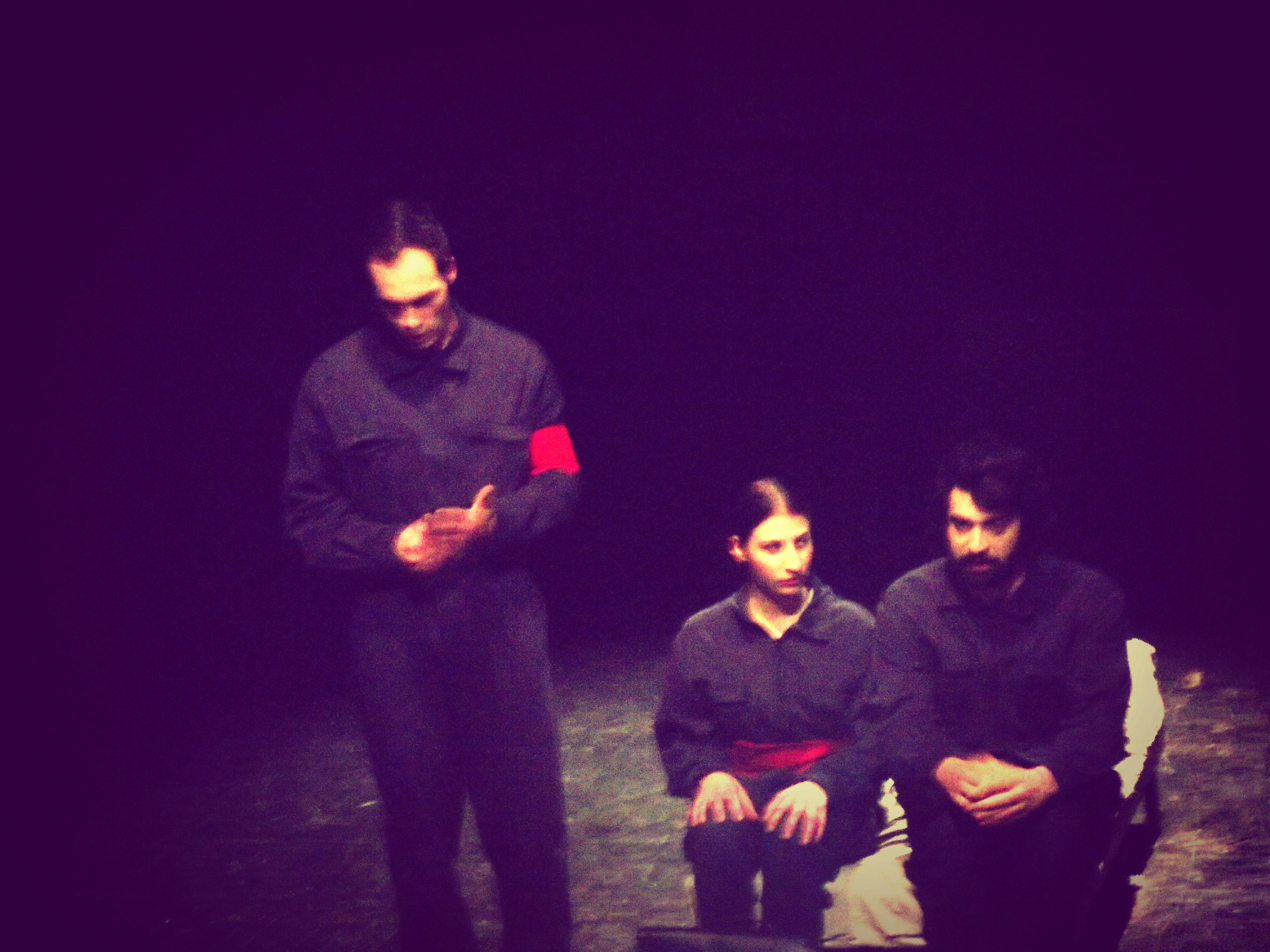
Nineteen Eighty-Four in Sarajevo War Theatre, 2013
