= Ermin Sijamija =

Bosnian actor (born 1974)

- Born: 26 November 1974 (age 50); Travnik, SR Bosnia and Herzegovina, SFR Yugoslavia
- Occupation: Actor
- Years active: 1999–present
- Spouse: Amra Kapidžić
- Children: 3

Ermin Sijamija (born 26 November 1974) is a Bosnian theatre, film and television actor. Most notably, he starred in TV series Viza za budućnost and in the 2003 multiple award-winning Bosnian film Remake.

== Personal life ==
During filming of Viza za budućnost, he met Amra Kapidžić, and the two eventually got married. They have three children.

== Filmography ==
=== Film ===
Year	Title	Role	Notes
2003	Remake	Young Ahmed Karaga	
2003	War Story	Unknown	Short film
2003	Summer in the Golden Valley	Mister BH	
2006	The Sky Above the Landscape	Humanitarian 1	
2006	All for Free	Make-Up Artist	
2007	Like Father	Unknown	Short film
2007	I Have to Sleep, My Angel	Fellow Doctor	
2011	In the Land of Blood and Honey	Vuc	
2012	Twice Born	Unknown	
2013	At Least We Survived	Edhem	Short film
2016	Death in Sarajevo	Sef	
2018	For Good Old Times	Dean	
2018	Good Day's Work	Unknown	
2019	A Hidden Life	Ermin	
2019	Full Moon	Jasmin	
2020	Quo Vadis, Aida?	Lalović	
2021	Not So Friendly Neighborhood Affair	Braco	
2022	Sixth Bus	Unknown	

=== Television ===
Year	Title	Role	Notes
1999	Nepitani	Unknown	TV film
2002–2008	Viza za budućnost	Sabahudin "Saša" Kreljo	144 episodes & 2 specials
2004	Crna hronika	Ljubiša	8 episodes
2015	Legends	Isa	2 episodes
2019	Whiskey Cavalier	Stavros Pappas	1 episode
2021-2022	Klan	Celavac	2 episodes
