= Safet Plakalo =

Bosnian writer (1950–2015)

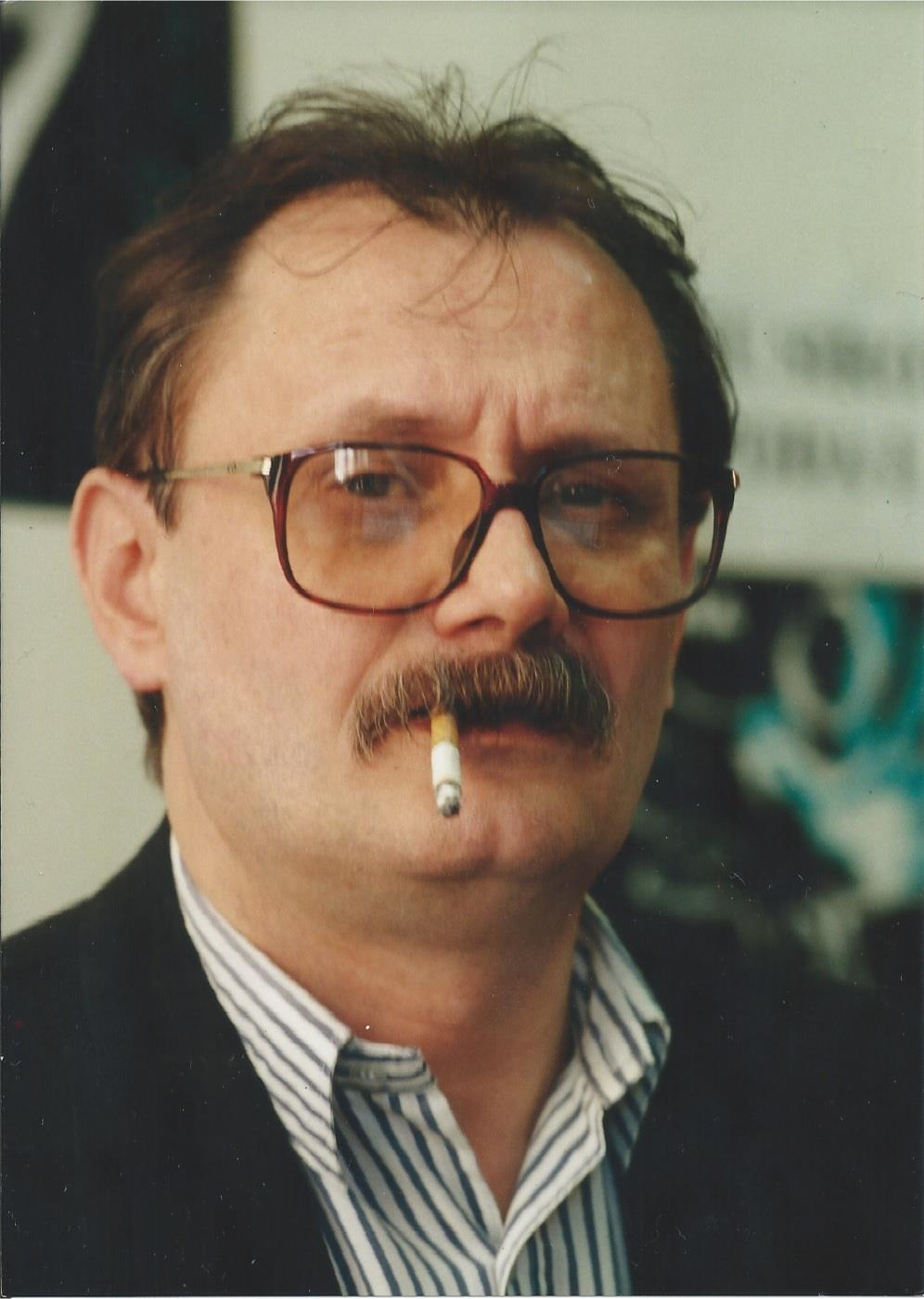
- Born: 4 March 1950; Plakali, Montenegro, Yugoslavia
- Died: 19 March 2015 (aged 65); Sarajevo, Bosnia and Herzegovina
- Known for: Founder of Sarajevo War Theatre (SARTR)
- Notable work: Chamber of Visions / Soba Od Vizije (2003), Fatima the Gracious (1998), Memoirs of Mina Housen (1995), The Shelter (1992), A Doll's Wasteland (1990), Phoenix has burnt in vain (1984)
- Awards: The Sarajevo Canton Plaque (2015) for the outstanding contribution to the development of arts in Sarajevo and Bosnia and Herzegovina. Best contemporary drama (1991) by the Association of Theatre Critics and Theatrologists of Bosnia and Herzegovina. Best Dramatic Text at the 21st International Theatre Meetings in Brčko (2004). MESS International Theatre Festival Award "Marko Kovačević" for outstanding contribution to theatre criticism (2004).

Safet Plakalo (4 March 1950 – 19 March 2015) was a Bosnian playwright and poet, theatre critic, journalist, and founder of the Sarajevo War Theatre (Sarajevski ratni teatar, SARTR). He was a prominent figure in Bosnian drama, known for his poetic and modernist theatrical works and his significant role in sustaining cultural life during the Siege of Sarajevo.

Together with Gradimir Gojer, Đorđe Mačkić and Dubravko Bibanović, Plakalo founded SARTR in 1992 as a form of artistic resistance during the war. There he also served as a longtime director and co-wrote the first wartime play of the Bosnian War—Sklonište (The Shelter). Beyond his dramatic writing, he was a respected theatre critic, poet and journalist advocating for Bosnian and Herzegovinian theatrical culture.

== Career ==
Having written his first play, Vrh (The Peak), at the age of 26, Plakalo held the honour of being the youngest playwright in the history of Bosnia and Herzegovina to have a play staged by a professional theatre. The play, which premiered on 23 March 1977 at Kamerni Teatar 55 (Chambre Teatre 55), was directed by his high school friend and longtime collaborator, Dubravko Bibanović, with whom he had engaged in early artistic, activist and conceptual projects. Famously, the creative duo organised the 1969 Poetic Marathon, during which over 250 Yugoslav poets gathered to continuously recite poetry for several days and nights across various locations in Sarajevo.

The success of Vrh had secured Plakalo his first commission to write a play about the 1941 anti-fascist insurgence in the Romanija region near Sarajevo. Though one of his best plays, Iza šutnje's (Beyond Silence) attempt to demystify the legend of Slaviša Vajner Čiča, a Partisan leader at the heart of the events, displeased Bosnian political censors. As a result, the play was withdrawn from the repertoires of four leading Bosnian theatres.

He wrote his third play, Nit (The Thread), in the middle of the censorship battle. Disheartened, he temporarily gave up dramatic work to become a theatre critic. Between 1977 and 1980, while his daughter was still a girl, Plakalo also wrote radio plays for children (Koncert za klavir i svjetlost, Preparirano proljeće and Balada o Modrinji). All three plays were commissioned and produced by Radio Sarajevo.

It was the death of his wife, Sonja, that would bring Plakalo back to the theatre to write a play in her memory, Phoenix je sagorio uzalud (Phoenix Has Burnt In Vain), and finally see another of his works premiered on a theatre stage. The play was directed by Gradimir Gojer for Narodno Pozorište Zenica (People's Theatre in Zenica), where it premiered in 1984.

In the article “Feniks (ni)je sagorio uzalud”, Muhamed Dželilović writes that Plakalo's "earliest plays—especially Vrh and Phoenix Burned in Vain—introduced a pronounced lyrical-reflective and intimate discourse into Bosnian and Herzegovinian drama". In doing so, he shaped an original dramatic model that uniquely connected "modernist symbolism with poetic drama".

What followed was Lutkino bespuće (A Doll's Wasteland), Plakalo's response to Henrik Ibsen's A Doll's House (Nora), which earned him a reputation as the 'Ibsen of Bosnia' both at home and abroad. The play, produced in 1991 by the Chamber Theatre 55 (Kamerni teatar 55) under the directorial baton of Vladimir Milčin, caught the eye of Norway's Ibsen Stage Festival. But Plakalo's international plans had to be put on hold as Sarajevo came under siege in 1992.

== Theatre against death ==
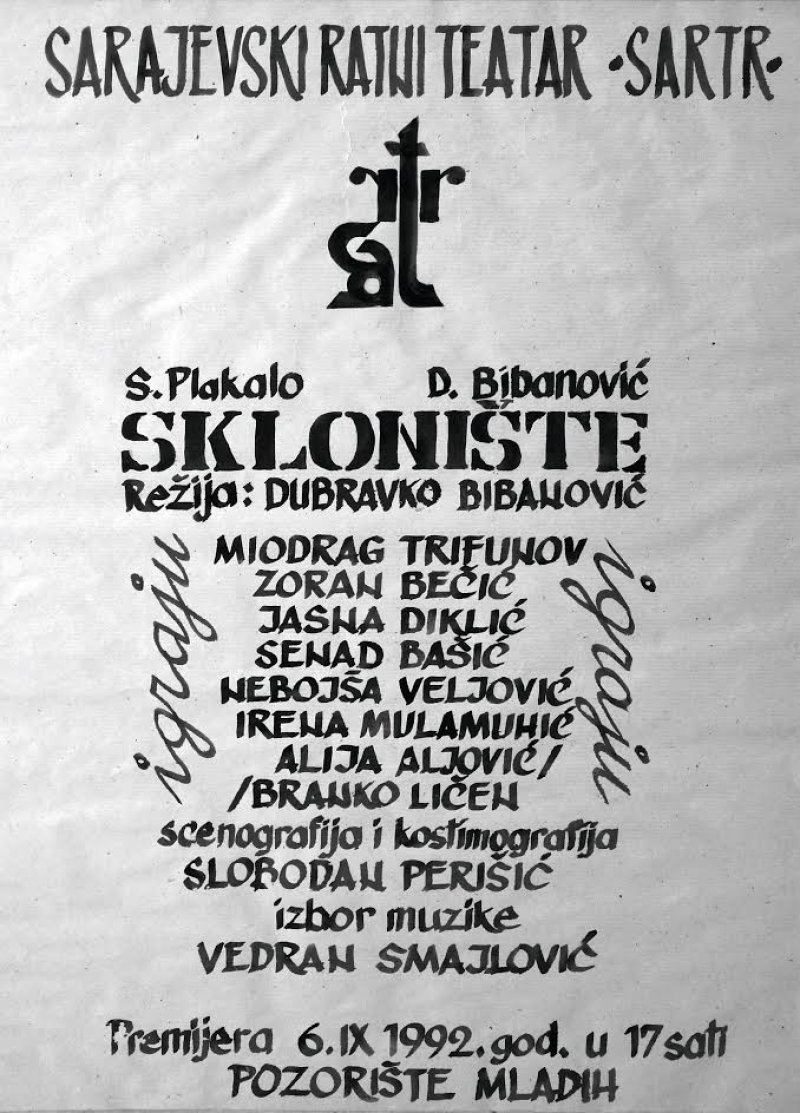
The original wartime poster for the play “Sklonište” can be seen at the Historical Museum of Sarajevo, where it forms part of the permanent exhibition on the Siege of Sarajevo (1992–1996).

In the city paralysed by war, Plakalo and three of his close friends and collaborators, Gradimir Gojer, Đorđe Mačkić and Dubravko Bibanović, decided to form Sarajevo War Theatre (SARTR) as a form of spiritual resistance to the madness of war. Together with Bibanović, Plakalo embarked on writing Sarajevo's first wartime play Sklonište (The Shelter), using the genre of grotesque to approach the tragedy that unfolded around them. The play premiered on 6 September 1992.

During the next 12 months, Sarajevans braved shelling, snipers and hunger to see Sklonište 97 times, often under candlelight. The theatre's ensemble did the same for its audience, taking the performance to the front line on more than one occasion and giving some 200 performances during Sarajevo's four years under siege.

In 1994, at the height of the siege, Plakalo wrote a letter to his friend Stein Wing, director of the National Theatre of Norway, and with support from Václav Havel, Ingmar Bergman, Ellen Horn and Bibi Andersson, the troupe made its way through Sarajevo's only lifeline, the famous Tunnel, to make its first international appearance at the Ibsen Stage Festival in Oslo. Since then, SARTR has made hundreds of appearances around Europe, and collaborated widely, most notably with Bordeaux's Globe Theatre, and the Ex-ponto International Festival in Slovenia, a trajectory shaped in part by the poetic and visionary dramaturgy exemplified in Plakalo’s text Soba od vizije/Chambre of Vision.

The Memoirs of Mina Hauzen, a play spun off by Plakalo from the immensely popular Munchausenesque character of Mina Hauzen from Sklonište, was SARTR's first post-war production. However, despite their immense popularity, neither Sklonište, nor The Memoirs had a lasting effect on Plakalo's dramatic orientation. As the world around him returned to an uneasy peace, Plakalo returned to the theatre of human intimacy, penning an hommage to his mother in a play about Prophet Muhammad's daughter, Fatima. The most complex of his plays, Hazreti Fatima (Fatima the Gracious), marks Plakalo's return to another interest – poetic drama. His fascination with the fundamental philosophical issues of human existence resurfaced in the 2012 play U traganju za bojom kestena (In search of the colour of chestnut), another homage—this time to the great American poet Sylvia Plath. The play achieved great critical acclaim in the 2012 production by the Mostar Youth Theatre, directed by Stevan Bodroža, becoming the most awarded production in the theatre’s history.

Plakalo was a long-time journalist for Sarajevo’s Radio 202, Večernje novine, and Oslobođenje. As a respected dramatist and theatre critic, in 2009 he was awarded the MESS International Theatre Festival Marko Kovačević Award for work in the area of theater critique, publishing and theatre studies.

== Death ==
On the edge of the poster for his first wartime play, Sklonište, Safet Plakalo wrote: "All of this happened by chance. Yet chance is a human duty." Reflecting on the role of art in the war, he later wrote a fitting epitaph for himself:

"Art in all its forms, including theatre, is powerless before the forces of evil, but it is powerful in that it can stir within the human soul an emotional charge that steels a person’s resistance to evil."

Plakalo died in Sarajevo on 19 March 2015 and was posthumously awarded the Plaque of the Canton of Sarajevo in recognition of his outstanding contribution to the promotion and development of Sarajevo and Bosnia and Herzegovina in the field of culture and the arts.

== Bibliography ==
=== Plays, radio dramas and librettos ===
- Vrh (The Peak), 1976.
- Koncert za klavir i svjetlost (The Concerto for Piano and Light), 1977.
- Iza šutnje (Beyond Silence), 1977.
- Preparirano proljeće (The Stuffed Springtime), 1979.
- Balada o Modrinji (A Ballad about Modrinja), 1980.
- Nit (In vino veritas) (The Thread), 1982.
- Phoenix je sagorio uzalud (Phoenix has burnt in vain), 1984.
- Balada o ex-šampionu (A Ballad about an Ex-champion), 1985.
- Lutkino bespuće (A Doll's Wasteland), 1990.
- Sklonište (The Shelter), 1992.
- Memoari Mine Hauzen (The Memoirs of Mina Houzen), 1995.
- Hazreti Fatima (Fatima the Gracious), 1998.
- Omer za naćvama, a libretto based on a play by Alija Nametak, 1999.
- Soba od vizije/Chambre des Visions, 2003
- "Kraljice" (Queens), 2003. – the author of songs
- U traganju za bojom kestena (In search of the colour of chestnut), 2012.

=== Novels ===
- Plod smrti, forthcoming

=== Poetry ===
- "Sabrane pjesme" (The poetry collection), 2004.

=== Articles and publications ===
- MAK, 1917–1997

== See also ==
- List of playwrights
- List of poets
- List of Bosnia and Herzegovina people

== Bibliography ==
- Bibanović, Zoran. "Kako su Safet Plakalo, Dubravko Bibanović i sarajevski glumci pomogli građanima da ne polude pod granatama", Depo.ba, 04/06/2017. https://depo.ba/clanak/161727/kako-su-safet-plakalo-dubravko-bibanovic-i-sarajevski-glumci-pomogli-gradanima-da-ne-polude-pod-granatama
- Bilić, Aleksandra. "Theatre and Performance as a means of survival and resistance during the Siege of Sarajevo", Academia.edu, n/d. https://www.academia.edu/10869586/Theatre_and_Performance_as_a_means_of_survival_and_resistance_during_the_Siege_of_Sarajevo
- Dželilovic, Muhamed. "Fenix (ni)je sagorio uzalud". Tačno.net, 20 March 2015
- Grabovac, A. "Safet Plakalo o priznanju za teatarsku kritiku: Nagrada me dirnula jer nosi Markovo ime". Dnevni Avaz. 24/10/2009. Digitalni arhiv - Infobiro. infobiro.ba. Retrieved 2026-02-02.
- Kapetanović, Emir Z. "Dokumentarni film „Sklonište"". SARTR. 2020-04-06. https://sartr.ba/dokumentarni-film-skloniste/ Retrieved 2026-02-02.
- Knežević, Maja, "A letter about the author" in Plakalo, Safet, Hazreti Fatima, 1998, pp.126-133
- Kodrić, Sanjin, "Dramatološki aspekti teodramskog diskursa u Hazreti Fatimi Safeta Plakala". Pismo: Časopis za jezik i književnost. Sarajevo: Bosansko filološko društvo. II/1 (2004), pp. 266-274.
- Muzaferija, Gordana. Antologija bošnjačke drame XX vijeka. 1996
- Plakalo, Safet. "Dok muze žeđaju." 17 May 2022. https://sartr.ba/wp-content/uploads/2022/05/XXX-Sartr-Monografija-V4_compressed.pdf
- Sporišević, Iman. "Kako je usred rata u Sarajevu režirana predstava i otvoreno pozorište", Klix.ba, 17/04/2021. https://www.klix.ba/magazin/kultura/kako-je-usred-rata-u-sarajevu-rezirana-predstava-i-otvoreno-pozoriste/210406067
- Vranac, Amela. Amela Vranac. "Šta je Nora nama ženama? (Drama Lutkino bespuće Safeta Plakala)". Pismo - Časopis za jezik i književnost 06:227-238. https://www.ceeol.com/search/article-detail?id=185175
- Vujanović, Vojislav. Review, Bilten Pozorišnih Igara u Brčkom, 7 November 2004
- Vukobrat, Budo (2015-03-20). "In memoriam Safet Plakalo: Perom i srcem za pozorište". Radio Slobodna Evropa (in Serbo-Croatian). Retrieved 2026-02-02.
