= Zlatko Topčić =

Bosnian playwright and novelist (born 1955)

- Born: 30 April 1955 (age 71); Sarajevo, SR Bosnia and Herzegovina, SFR Yugoslavia
- Education: University of Sarajevo (LLB)
- Occupation: Writer
- Spouse: Amela Topčić (m. 1996)
- Children: Kerim Topčić
- Parent(s): Zaim Topčić; Naila Selimić
- Writing career
- Pen name: Gold Taucher

Signature
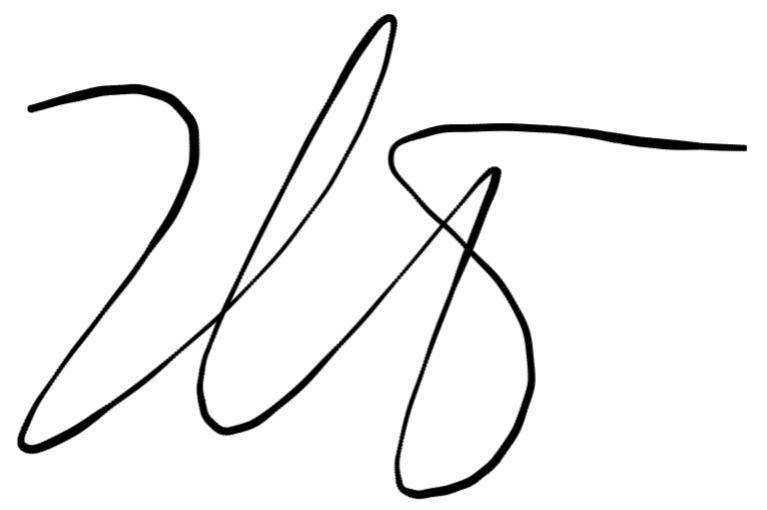

Zlatko Topčić (born 30 April 1955) is a Bosnian screenwriter, playwright and novelist. He has written a number of films, including: Remake, The Abandoned, Miracle in Bosnia; theater plays: Time Out, I Don't Like Mondays, Refugees; novels: The Final Word, Dagmar, June 28, 1914.

Topčić's works have been translated into twelve languages: English, German, French, Italian, Czech, Turkish, Polish, Swedish, Slovenian, Bulgarian, Macedonian, Albanian, and included in several domestic and international anthologies.

He is a member of the Association of Writers of Bosnia and Herzegovina, PEN Center of Bosnia and Herzegovina, Association of Filmmakers in Bosnia and Herzegovina, International Screenwriters Association, American Screenwriters Association, Concordia Organization and the Royal Institute of International Affairs (Chatham House).

In 2004, he was included on the annual Marquis Who's Who in the World list of the 100 most influential people in the world.

== Early life and family ==
Topčić was born in Sarajevo on 30 April 1955. His father, Zaim Topčić (1920–1990), was also a writer. His mother, Naila (1925–2002), was a member of the Selimić family; her grandfather was Zaim-beg Selimić, a municipal councilor, landowner, benefactor and philanthropist, who was the owner of the Kravica waterfall.

He graduated from the Law School of the University of Sarajevo. At the age of 17 and under the pseudonym Gold Taucher, Topčić began writing crime novels and short stories, selling millions of copies.

== Career ==
=== Theatrical work ===
Topčić has produced over forty plays, including The Frog, which was adapted into a film in 2017, and Helver's Night, internationally most awarded play in the history of Bosnian and Herzegovinian theater. He is the only author who thrice won the BZK Preporod Award for best dramatic text, for dramas Bare Skin (2006), Krokodil Lacoste / Silvertown (2010) and Nobody's and Everyone's (2017).

Topčić's plays, which have been staged in Bosnian and Herzegovinian and international theaters, include Collapse (1986), Musa and the Goat (1993), Kulin Ban (1995), Refugees (1999), Plaza Hotel (2000), Time Out (2002), comedy Head-On (2004), monodrama Pardon Asks Radivoje, Radivoje's Son (2006), Happy New 1994! (2006), Bare Skin (2007), I Don't Like Mondays (2009; directed by Christian Papke), Krokodil Lacoste / Silvertown (2011) and Puzzle Opera (2020). I Don't Like Mondays (2009) won the prestigious PEN Austrian Center Award. In 2010 the drama was published in German by Der Österreichische PEN-Club, Vienna, and was printed in over eleven thousand copies.

His play Time Out (2002; directed by James P. Mirrione) had its English premiere in London at the Gate Theatre and toured to the Riverside Studios, the West Yorkshire Playhouse in Leeds, the Royal Armouries Museum, Powerhouse 1, and Bretton Hall. Also, it was performed in the United States (New York City), Austria (Vienna) and Poland (Warsaw).

=== Screenplays ===
Topčić wrote the screenplays for four documentary films: The Best Years Ever (1994), Miracle in Bosnia (1995), I Respond to You, God (1996) and Blood and Musk (1997). He also wrote the screenplays for Remake (2003) and The Abandoned (2010). His script for Remake (published like a book in 2002) was awarded at the competition of the Ministry of Culture and won the Association of Filmmakers in Bosnia and Herzegovina Award for best original screenplay (1999). His script for The Abandoned (working title: Bare Skin) was a winning (91 participants) at the first edition of CineLink, held as part of the 9th Sarajevo Film Festival (2003) and won the Best Screenplay Award at the 2011 Hollywood Film Festival.

His films have been screened at numerous international film festivals, including: Cannes Film Festival, Venice Film Festival, Berlin International Film Festival, International Film Festival Rotterdam, Karlovy Vary International Film Festival, Toronto International Film Festival, Locarno Festival, New York Film Festival, Los Angeles Film Festival, Hollywood Film Festival, International Documentary Film Festival Amsterdam, and many other.

=== Fiction ===
He has published a collections of stories: The Vital Question (1981), Fantastic Stories (1989), Ptica iz drugog jata / A Bird From Another Flock (bilingual edition; 1995), Bogomil Legends (1997) and Selected Stories (2000); such a novels as A Man From Nowhere (1986), Kulin (1994), Nightmare (1997), Bare Skin (2004), Safet Sušić (2007), The Final Word (2011), Dagmar (2013), zavrsna.rijecdagmar (2017), Overture (2018) and June 28, 1914 (2019, 2021).

In 1998 he won the prestigious Annual Award of the Association of Writers of Bosnia and Herzegovina for his novel Nightmare (1997), which was translated into Turkish (Saray Bosna da kabus, Gendas, Istanbul, 1998) and Slovenian (Mora, Založba Goga, Novo Mesto, 2003). In 2014 he won the same award for novel Dagmar (2013) and became one of the few writers who have twice won this award (his father Zaim Topčić was also a double winner).

Topčić's novel The Final Word (2011) received the Hasan Kaimija Award for best book published in 2011 and 2012, and the Skender Kulenović Award for best book published in 2011. It was translated into French (Le mot de la fin, M.E.O. Edition, Brussels, 2016) and was ranked first on several bestseller lists.

Dagmar, his 2013 novel, won the Fra Grgo Martić Award for best book of fiction published in 2013. It was translated into Czech (For Prague, Prague, 2017).

=== Other work ===
Topčić was a board member of the Open Society Foundation Bosnia and Herzegovina - Soros Foundation, worked on several UNESCO projects and is the founder of the Bosnian Tombstone Award and Nedžad Ibrišimović Award. He is one of the founders of the Association of Writers of Bosnia and Herzegovina, from 1993 to 2001 the first Secretary General and from 2006 to 2010 a board member. From 2001 to 2011 he was director and artistic director of the Chamber Theater 55.

He was selector of the International Theatre Festival MESS, president and member of several juries, among others, Foundation for Cinematography jury member for film projects financing. From 2013 to 2016 he was general director of TVSA. In 2016 he became director of the Library of Sarajevo. Topčić was a member of the Commission for Free Artists of Bosnia and Herzegovina, president of Arts Council of the Sarajevo National Theatre from 2015 to 2019 and a member of Council of the BHRT Governing Board from 2019 to 2021.

== Personal life ==
Topčić spent the entirety of the Bosnian War in Sarajevo. He was trapped in Grbavica (quarter of the city of Sarajevo) in 1993. Fifty years earlier (1943) his father Zaim Topčić (1920–1990) was trapped in the Jasenovac concentration camp during World War II, as a communist. About these events, he wrote the screenplay for Remake.

He lives in Sarajevo with his wife Amela and his son Kerim.

== Quotes ==
"War is a war. Everywhere is hard and bloody, but the Balkans in it bring their coloring and passion. Someone happened to be on the right side. But, madam, be without worry: it is not so far a day when both sides will become the same and when it will not be known which side of the story is right."

—In novel A Man From Nowhere, 1986

== Filmography ==
Year	Title	Writer	Producer	Director	Composer
1994	The Best Years Ever	Yes	Yes	Yes	Yes
1995	Miracle in Bosnia	Yes	Yes	No	No
1996	I Respond to You, God	Yes	Yes	Yes	Yes
1997	Blood and Musk	Yes	Yes	Yes	Yes
2003	Remake	Yes	No	No	No
2010	The Abandoned	Yes	No	No	No

== Theater plays ==
- Collapse, 1986
- Musa and the Goat, 1993
- Kulin Ban, 1995
- Refugees, 1999
- Plaza Hotel, 2000
- Time Out, 2002
- Head-On, 2004
- Pardon Asks Radivoje, Radivoje's Son, 2006
- Happy New 1994!, 2006
- I Don't Like Mondays, 2009
- Krokodil Lacoste / Silvertown, 2011
- Puzzle Opera, 2020

== Radio dramas ==
- Happy New Year's Eve, 1977
- Interview, 1978
- Emergency Situation, 1987
- Walk on the Tips of Your Fingers, 1988
- Cesare Lombroso, 1989
- Kulin, 1990
- Lister's Machine, 1991
- Musa and the Goat, 1992
- Stanislavski Would Be Pleased, 2007

== Bibliography ==
=== Collections of stories ===
- The Vital Question, 1981
- Fantastic Stories, 1989
- Ptica iz drugog jata / A Bird From Another Flock, 1995
- Bogomil Legends, 1997
- Selected Stories, 2000

=== Novels ===
- A Man From Nowhere, 1986
- Kulin, 1994
- Nightmare, 1997, 1998, 2000, 2004
- Bare Skin, 2004
- Safet Sušić, 2007
- The Final Word, 2011
- Dagmar, 2013
- zavrsna.rijecdagmar, 2017
- Overture, 2018
- June 28, 1914, 2019, 2021

=== Books of dramas ===
- Collapse, 1988
- Plays, 1995
- Refugees, 1999
- Time Out, 2001
- Eight Pieces, 2005
- Bare Skin, 2007
- I Don't Like Mondays, 2010
- Krokodil Lacoste / Silvertown, 2016
- Angry Men, 2016
- Nobody's and Everyone's, 2019

== Awards ==
- The Award at an anonymous competition of Radio Sarajevo for radio drama Interview, 1978
- The Award at an anonymous competition of Radio Sarajevo for radio drama Emergency Situation, 1987
- The Annual Award of the Association of Writers of Bosnia and Herzegovina for best book published in 1997 for novel Nightmare, 1998
- The Association of Filmmakers in Bosnia and Herzegovina Award for screenplay A Man From Nowhere (Remake), 1999
- The Award of the Ministry of Culture for screenplay Remake, 1999
- The Award of the Ministry of Culture for drama Time Out, 2000
- The CineLink Award (Sarajevo Film Festival) for screenplay Bare Skin (The Abandoned), 2003
- The Award of magazine TmačaArt for best drama Head-On, 2004
- The Award of magazine TmačaArt for best drama Happy New 1994!, 2004
- The Award for best dramatic text at the Festival of Bosnian-Herzegovinian Theaters for drama Head-On, 2004
- The BZK Preporod Award for best dramatic text Bare Skin, 2006
- The Award at an anonymous competition of Radio Sarajevo for radio drama Stanislavski Would Be Pleased, 2007
- The Award for best contemporary text at the Theatre Games for drama Happy New 1994!, 2007
- The PEN Austrian Center Award for drama I Don't Like Mondays, 2009
- The BZK Preporod Award for best dramatic text Krokodil Lacoste / Silvertown, 2010
- The Award for best contemporary text at the Theatre Games for drama Krokodil Lacoste / Silvertown, 2011
- The Best Screenplay Award at the Transilvania International Film Festival for The Abandoned, 2011
- The Best Screenplay Award at the Golden Carpathian Film Festival for The Abandoned, 2011
- The Best Screenplay Award at the Hollywood Film Festival for The Abandoned, 2011
- The Skender Kulenović Award for best book published in 2011 for novel The Final Word, 2012
- The Hasan Kaimija Award for best book published in 2011 and 2012 for novel The Final Word, 2012
- The Fra Grgo Martić Award for best book of fiction published in 2013 for novel Dagmar, 2013
- The Annual Award of the Association of Writers of Bosnia and Herzegovina for best book published in 2013 for novel Dagmar, 2014
- The BZK Preporod Award for best dramatic text Nobody's and Everyone's, 2017
- The Award of the Publishing Foundation for best book for novel June 28, 1914, 2021
- The 25 November Award for the book of the year for novel June 28, 1914, 2022

== See also ==
- List of Bosnia and Herzegovina people
- List of people from Sarajevo
- List of Bosniak writers
- List of Bosniaks
