= Žan Marolt =

Bosnia actor (1964–2009)

- Born: Žan Marolt; 25 September 1964; Sarajevo, SR Bosnia and Herzegovina, SFR Yugoslavia
- Died: 11 July 2009 (aged 44); Sarajevo, Bosnia and Herzegovina
- Resting place: Bare Cemetery, Sarajevo
- Education: Academy of Performing Arts in Sarajevo
- Occupation: Actor
- Years active: 1984–2009
- Spouse: Tatjana Šojić

Žan Marolt (25 September 1964 – 11 July 2009) was a Bosnian actor and TV personality. He was a regular actor of the Chamber Theatre 55 where he made numerous roles in the theater, in plays such as Buba u uhu, Umri muški, Kidaj od svoje žene, Ujak Vanja and in numerous films and television shows.

The last Marolt's role was in the multiple award-winning film The Abandoned (2010).

== Personal life ==
Marolt was married to the Bosnian actress Tatjana Šojić until his death in 2009.

== Death ==
Marolt died in his hometown of Sarajevo on 11 July 2009 after a long battle with cancer. He was buried two days later, on 14 July in Sarajevo at the Bare Cemetery.

== Filmography ==
=== Film ===
Year	Title	Role	Notes
1985	Audicija	Audience member	Uncredited role
1987	The Magpie Strategy		
1988	Vanbračna putovanja		
1988	Inat		
1989	Puki		
1991	Cartier Project	Fačo	
1994	Rusko primirje		
1997	Elvis		
1999	Jours tranquilles à Sarajevo		
2000	Tunel		
2000	Buđenje		
2000	The Strangers		
2000	Milky Way	Mujo Hrle	
2001	Borac		
2004	Nema problema	Aldo Jako	
2005	Dobro uštimani mrtvaci	Risto	
2006	Warchild	Volleyball trainer	
2007	Tea		
2007	The Hunting Party	Journalist #6	
2010	The Abandoned	Guard	

=== Television ===
Year	Title	Role	Notes
1988	Zabavni utorak		
1990	Strategija švrake		3 episodes
1990	Otvori prozor		
1991	Sarajevske priče	Sabahudin Preslica	1 episode
1999	Familija d.o.o.		1 episode
2001	Lutkokaz		
2003–2006	Viza za budućnost	Hrvoje Uskok	90 episodes
2006	Mikrofon je vaš	Hrvoje	2 episodes
2006; 2008	Naša mala klinika	Albin (Croatian version); Mustafa (Serbian version)	1 episode each
2006–2007	Tata i zetovi	Zoran Stupar	24 episodes
2007–2009	Lud, zbunjen, normalan	Enes Hadžiethemćumurović	36 episodes
2008	Rolo Koster		
2009	Kućni Ljubimci	Damir	8 episodes
