= Time Out (drama) =

2001 drama by Bosnian writer Zlatko Topčić

- Author: Zlatko Topčić
- Language: Bosnian; English; German; Polish
- Publication date: 2001 (Bosnian and English edition)
- Publication place: Bosnia and Herzegovina; Great Britain (London, Leeds, Wakefield); United States (New York City); Austria (Vienna); Poland (Warsaw)

Time Out is a drama by Bosnian writer Zlatko Topčić. It is bilingual, written in both Bosnian and English, won the Award of the Ministry of Culture and Sport in 2000 and was published in 2001.

Its 2002 British premiere, directed by James P. Mirrione, was performed in London at the Gate Theatre and Riverside Studios, as well as in Leeds at the West Yorkshire Playhouse, the Royal Armouries Museum, Powerhouse 1, and Bretton Hall. Also, it was performed in the United States (New York City at the Broadway theatre), Austria (Vienna) and Poland (Warsaw).

The play has attracted attention from media such as the BBC, CNN and received great ratings from audiences and critics. Time Out became the most watched Bosnian and ex-YU play of all time and the first drama from that region performed in Great Britain, Austria, Poland and the United States.

== Plot and theme ==
On a playground in Sarajevo, Bosnia, two basketball players are practicing for Olympiad, they consider themselves great talents and call themselves Pippin and MJ. But these two characters are very different from the great American basketball players from whom they borrowed the names - they lost their legs in the war and the Olympiad they are preparing for is for the disabled.

During reversals they talk about life, how to handle it now - one believes that it would be better to be dead and another that there is a value even in this life as it is, and they are haunted by memories. The second part is in a bar in Germany, after they missed the most important shot at the Olympiad for handicapped. They meet a girl for entertainment there that is also from Bosnia and they finish together in the room - in a dream or in death?
