= Nema problema (2004 film) =

- Directed by: Giancarlo Bocchi
- Written by: Giancarlo Bocchi; Arturo Curà; Luigi Riva
- Starring: Žan Marolt; Labina Mitevska
- Release date: 2004
- Running time: 85 min
- Country: Italy
- Languages: Italian; English

Nema problema is a 2004 Italian film directed by Giancarlo Bocchi.

== Plot ==
Lorenzi, a war correspondent, ventures into a Balkan territory contended by various warring factions. He is accompanied by Aldo Puhar, a local translator, with the purpose of unmasking a certain “Commander Jako”, who is believed to be responsible for the disappearance of an entire convoy of refugees. Due to a series of events, two young people join them, Maxime, a young journalist of strong ideals, and Sanja, a local girl desperately searching for her missing relatives. With good fortune, the four manage to enter the city of Vaku, currently under siege. Regardless of all the dangers they've gone through together, the four are irreversibly estranged by misunderstandings and suspicions.

== Cast ==
- Žan Marolt - Aldo Jako
- Labina Mitevska - Sanja K.
- Vincent Riotta - Anselmo Lorenzi
- Fabrizio Rongione - Maxime
