= Muhamed Karamusić Nihadi =

Bosnian poet

Muhamed Karamusić Nihadi (also spelled Mohammad Karamusić Nehādi; died 1587) was a Bosnian poet who lived and died in Sarajevo. Only one manuscript of Nihadi's divan is extant. It is stored in the German capital of Berlin, and was originally part of the belongings of Baron Heinrich Dietrich von Dietz (fl. 1790), the Prussian ambassador in the Ottoman capital of Constantinople (modern-day Istanbul). Von Dietz was also an Orientalist and a collector of manuscripts. The manuscript of Nihadi's divan consists of ninety-four ghazals, of which eight are composed in Persian.
