= The Final Word (novel) =

2011 Bosnian novel by Zlatko Topčić

- First edition
- Author: Zlatko Topčić
- Original title: Završna riječ
- Language: Bosnian; French
- Publisher: Europapress Holding & Novi Liber (Hanza Media in 2016); M.E.O. Edition; Buybook
- Publication date: 2011 (Bosnian edition); 2016 (French edition); 2017 (new Bosnian edition)
- Publication place: Croatia (Zagreb); Belgium (Brussels)

The Final Word (Bosnian: Završna riječ) is a bestseller novel by Bosnian writer Zlatko Topčić. It was published in 2011 by Europapress Holding & Novi Liber (Hanza Media in 2016).

== Recognition ==
It received the Hasan Kaimija Award for best book published in Bosnia and Herzegovina in 2011 and 2012, and the Skender Kulenović Award for best book published in Bosnia and Herzegovina in 2011.

The novel was labeled "the decisive work of post-Yugoslav engagement prose". Critics wrote that it is "a great world literature" from "a great world writer".

== Translations ==
The French translation (Le mot de la fin, M.E.O. Edition, Brussels) was published in 2016 and was ranked first on the list of international bestsellers of BookDaily in 2017, became the first novel from Southeast Europe to appear on that list.
