= Suada =

Suada may refer to:

- As-Suwayda, a city in Syria
- Suada (butterfly), a genus of grass skipper butterflies
- Suada, a female Islamic name, cognate of Suad, popular among Azerbaijani people and Bosniaks
  - Suada Alakbarova, Azerbaijani representative in the Junior Eurovision Song Contest 2012
  - Suada Dilberović, Bosnian war victim
  - "Suada" (song), by Plavi Orkestar, appeared on Soldatski bal
- Suada (or Suadela), a goddess in Roman mythology
