= Peter Paduh =

British businessman (born 1977)

- Born: 1977 (age 48–49); Sarajevo, SR Bosnia and Herzegovina
- Occupation: Entrepreneur
- Website: https://www.socialbox.biz/

Peter Paduh (born 1977 in Sarajevo) is a Bosnian-born British businessman and social entrepreneur. He is best known as the Young Business Person of the Year at the London Business Awards 2005, and for his involvement with the Computers for Older People Initiative with the Mayor of London and Age Concern and as a spokesperson for Refugees in the UK and for Corporate Social Responsibility (CSR).

He came to the UK as a refugee in his early teens when war broke out in the Balkans. He lived in a children's home for refugees in London. He worked for Gateway and Microsoft, then started a series of businesses..

Paduh is chairman of SocialBox.Biz, a consultant on digital inclusion, tech innovation and integration of refugees and homeless people.
