= Tanja Softić =

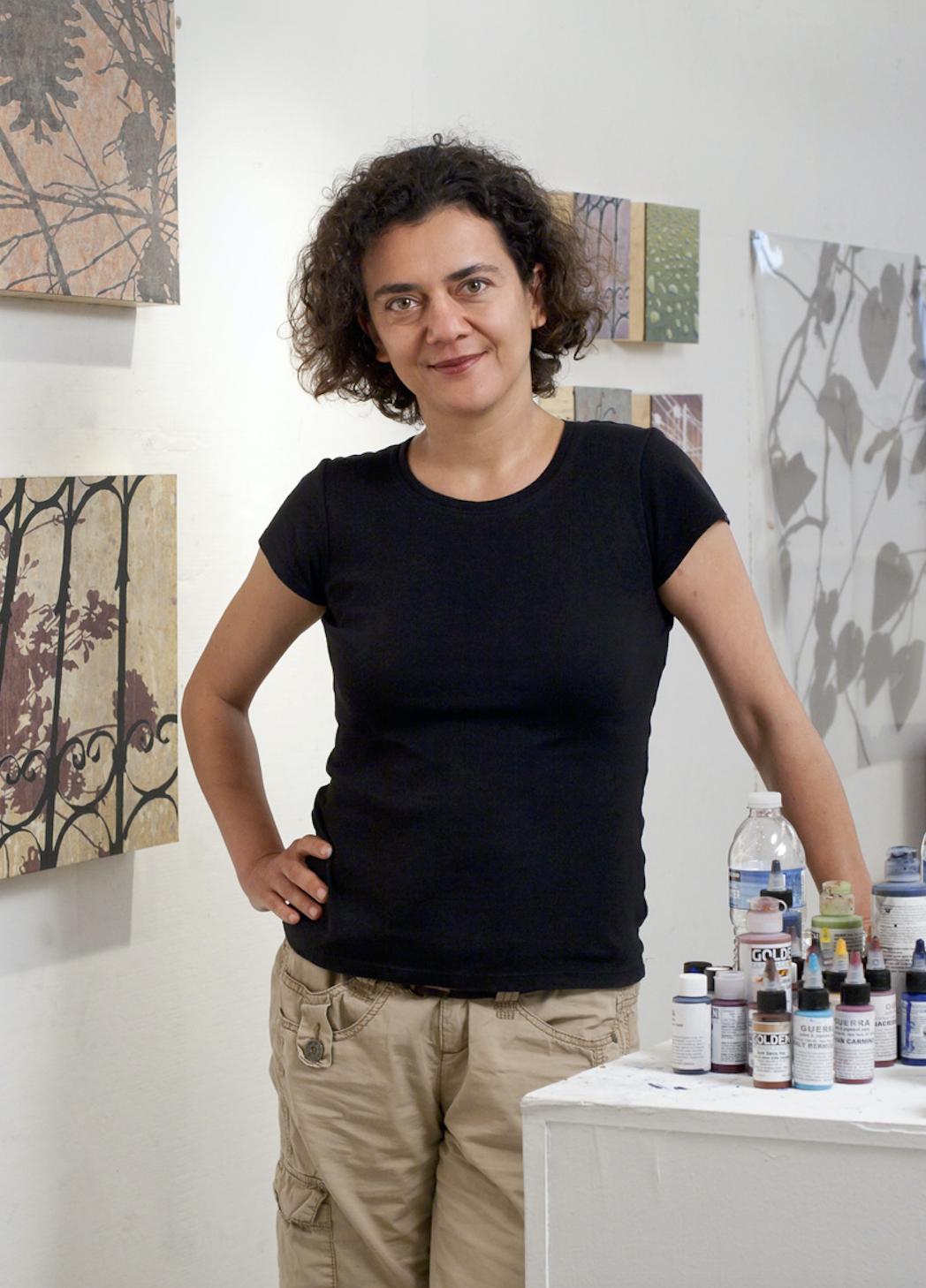
- Born: April 6, 1966 (age 59); Sarajevo, SFR Yugoslavia
- Education: Academy of Fine Arts University of Sarajevo, Old Dominion University
- Occupation: Artist
- Years active: 1985–present
- Website: tanjasoftic.com

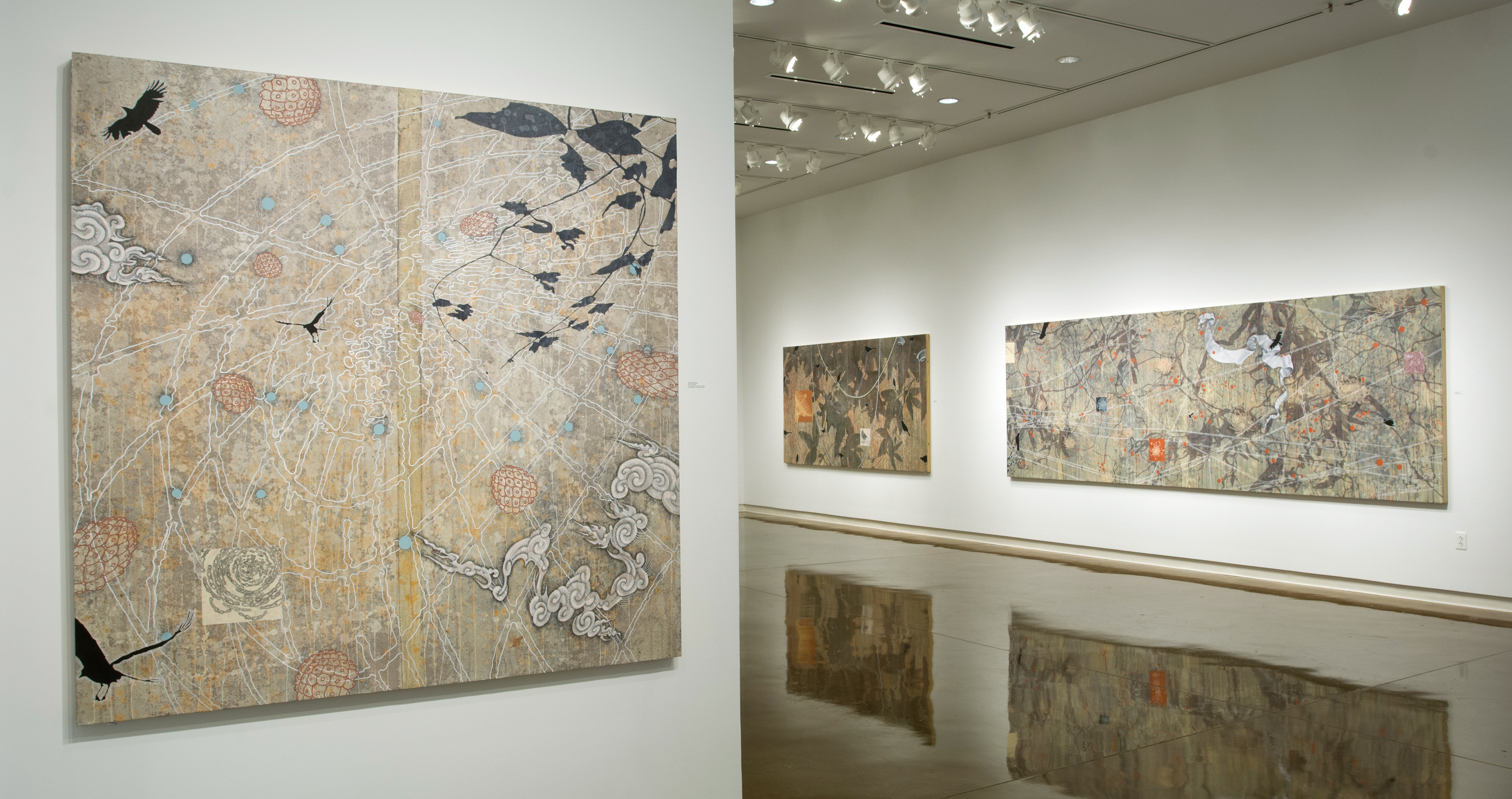
2011 Migrant Universe, Halsey Institute for Contemporary Art, College of Charleston, South Carolina.

Tanja Softić is a Bosnian-American visual artist and art educator who works in media of drawing, printmaking, painting and photography. She is Professor of Art Practice in the Department of Art and Art History at the University of Richmond.

== Personal life and career ==
Tanja Softić was born In 1966 in Sarajevo, former Yugoslavia, present-day Bosnia and Herzegovina. She attended the Academy of Fine Arts of the University of Sarajevo and Old Dominion University.

Softić emigrated to the United States in 1989 and now has American citizenship.

Softić's work is in the Auckland Art Gallery, and the Print Collection of The New York Public Library.

In 2011 her work was included in the exhibition Migrant Universe at the Halsey Institute of Contemporary Art. In 2012 Softić has a solo Walter Gropius Master Artist Exhibit at the Huntington Museum of Art. Her work is included in the 2020 virtual exhibition Dis/placements: Revisitations of Home at the Halsey Institute.
