= Time Out with Britney Spears =

Video by Britney Spears
- Released: November 23, 1999
- Recorded: 1998–1999
- Genre: Pop
- Length: 50:08
- Label: Jive
- Producer: Jac Benson; Janet Kleinbaum

Britney Spears chronology
Time Out with Britney Spears (1999)	Britney Spears: Live and More! (2000)

Time Out with Britney Spears (stylized in all lowercase) is the first video album by American singer Britney Spears. It was released on November 23, 1999, by Jive Records.

Time Out with Britney Spears received generally favorable reviews from music critics. A commercial success, it peaked atop the US Top Music Videos and was certified triple platinum by the Recording Industry Association of America (RIAA).

== Content ==
Time Out with Britney Spears features interviews with Spears about her childhood, The Mickey Mouse Club, the making of her debut album ...Baby One More Time and life on tour. The video album also features the music videos for her singles "...Baby One More Time", "Sometimes" and "(You Drive Me) Crazy (The Stop Remix!)", as well as behind-the-scenes footage from each of them. Also included are live versions of "Born to Make You Happy" and "From the Bottom of My Broken Heart" from her Disney Channel special, a photo gallery that features a mixture of candid and professional shots, web site access and a trivia game that unlocks a special interview "if you answer all the questions correctly". There is an option for lyrics to appear on the screen when watching the music videos or the live performances.

== Critical reception ==
Time Out with Britney Spears received generally favorable reviews from music critics. Heather Phares of AllMusic called Time Out with Britney Spears "one of the better music DVDs currently available" and "a must for Britney enthusiasts". Marc Girdler of DVD Talk agreed, calling the release a "disc for Spears' fans", that is full of "everything you could want, within reason". Girdler wrote that the interview footage is "pretty good", although "most of it is taken from MTV, so the content is not all exclusive to the disc". The option of having lyrics appear on the screen is, according to Girdler, "cool if you like to sing along, but have a bad memory".

== Commercial performance ==
In the United States, Time Out with Britney Spears debuted at number two on the Billboard Top Music Videos on December 18, 1999. It reached the summit in its fifth week, following its release on DVD. On June 15, 2000, the album was certified triple platinum by the Recording Industry Association of America (RIAA), for shipments of 300,000 units, while remaining atop the chart dated June 24. It last charted at number 37 on March 24, 2001, spending a total of 68 weeks on the chart.

== Track listing ==
Time Out with Britney Spears – Standard edition
No.	Title	Length
1.	"Growing Up"	9:35
2.	"Recording My First Album"	6:13
3.	"...Baby One More Time" (making-of and music video)	6:29
4.	"Sometimes" (making-of and music video)	10:50
5.	"(You Drive Me) Crazy" (The Stop Remix!) (making-of and music video)	5:48
6.	"On the Road"	3:41
7.	"Born to Make You Happy" (Disney Channel in Concert)	4:40
8.	"From the Bottom of My Broken Heart" (Disney Channel in Concert)	4:37
Total length:		50:08

Time Out with Britney Spears – Asian edition (bonus tracks)
No.	Title	Writer(s)	Producer(s)	Length
9.	"...Baby One More Time" (karaoke)	Max Martin	Martin; Rami
10.	"(You Drive Me) Crazy" (karaoke)	Jörgen Elofsson; Per Magnusson; David Kreuger; Martin	Magnusson; Kreuger; Martin

Time Out with Britney Spears – Japanese edition (bonus mini CD)
No.	Title	Writer(s)	Producer(s)	Length
1.	"(You Drive Me) Crazy" (Jazzy Jim's Hip-Hop Mix)	Elofsson; Magnusson; Kreuger; Martin	Martin; Rami; Jazzy Jim^{[a]}	3:40
2.	"I'm So Curious"	Britney Spears; Eric Foster White	White	3:35
3.	"(You Drive Me) Crazy" (Pimp Juice's Souled Out 4 the Suits Vocal Mix)	Elofsson; Magnusson; Kreuger; Martin	Martin; Rami; Pimp Juice^{[a]}	6:30

Notes

- ^{^a} signifies an additional producer

== Charts ==
Weekly chart performance for Time Out with Britney Spears
Chart (2000)	Peak position
UK Music Videos (OCC)	6
US Music Video Sales (Billboard)	1

== Certifications ==
Certifications and sales for Time Out with Britney Spears
Region	Certification	Certified units/sales
Canada (Music Canada)	4× Platinum	40,000^{^}
Germany (BVMI)	Gold	25,000^{^}
United Kingdom (BPI)	Gold	25,000^{^}
United States (RIAA)	3× Platinum	300,000^{^}
^{^} Shipments figures based on certification alone.

== Release history ==
Release dates and formats for Time Out with Britney Spears
Region	Date	Format(s)	Label(s)	Ref.
United States	November 23, 1999	VHS	Jive	
United States	December 21, 1999	DVD	Jive	
