= Shiye =

Bosnian musician

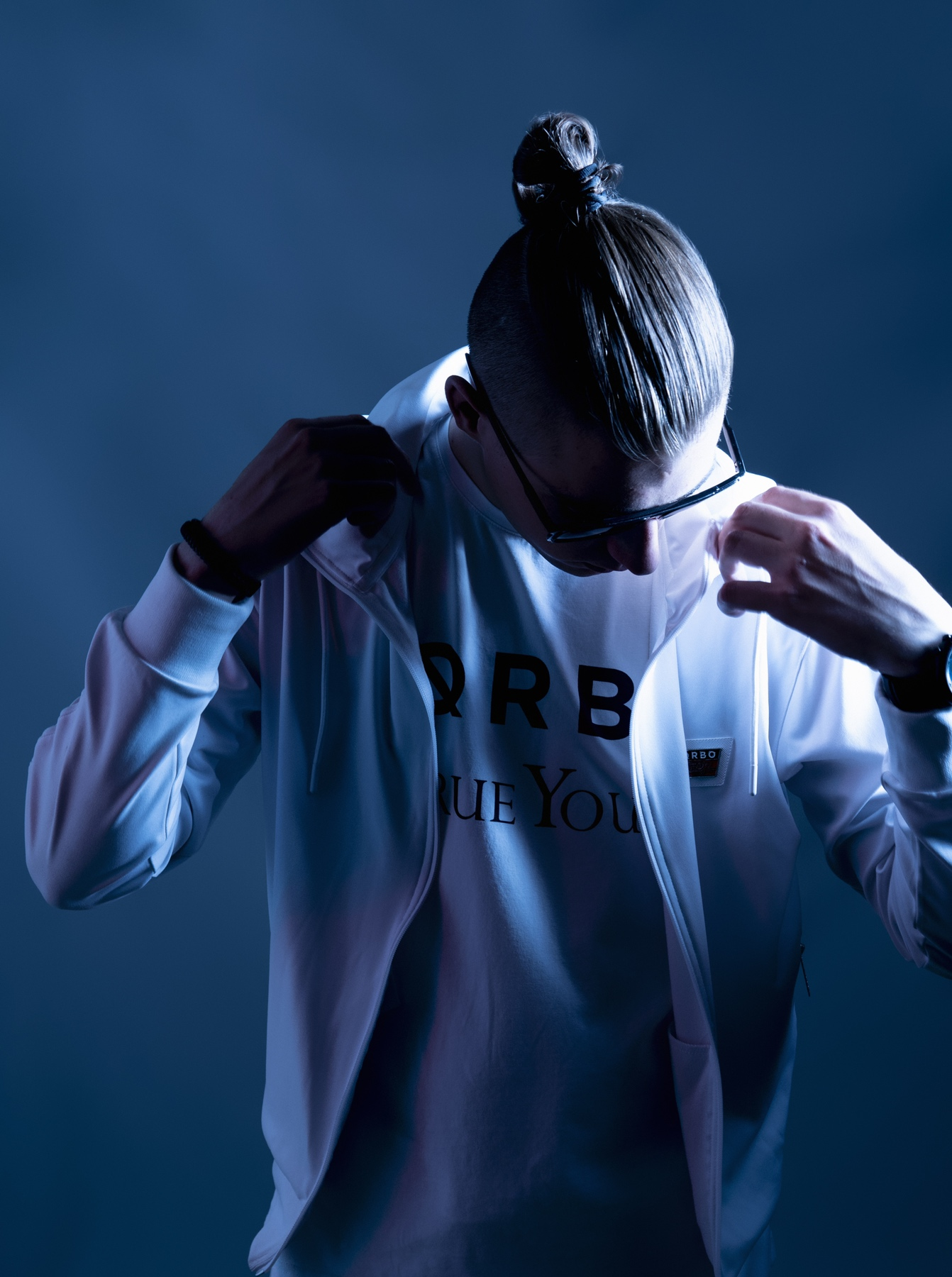
- Born: Dino Klisura; September 16, 1999 (age 26)
- Other names: Shiye
- Occupations: Musician, producer

Dino Klisura (born September 16, 1999), better known by his stage name Shiye is a musician and producer from Bosnia and Herzegovina. His music career started in DJ-ing EDM, and Big room, and Electro house music but since then, it turned to music production and hip-hop. He is one of the pioneers of Bosnian new wave hip-hop.

== Biography ==
He was born in Sarajevo in 1999. His interest in music started in his early years and his first breakthrough in the world of music happened in his high school, when he was mentored by Rijad Fazlić, AKA Kolateral, the late legend of underground Bosnian rap. Since then, his interests in electronic music grew and he published his first album "Silhouette" in 2018. After spending some time DJ-ing in Bosnia and Turkey, his interests turn to production where he established his brand making albums for Ex-Yu musicians/rappers such as Vahid Saltaga AKA Loga and Vuk Cvetković AKA WoO69. His newest album "Equinox" started as a collaboration with fellow musicians but quickly grew into a bigger project in which Dino not only made music but lyrics also, and sang in three languages: Bosnian, German, and English. His interest in electronic music continued on his academic studies of IT, a science which he used to travel around the world.

== Music style ==
Shiye's first album, Silhouette, brings a heritage from such legends of electronic music as Hardwell, but also brings his own brand and brand of music that marked his childhood as alternative rock, hip-hop, and electro music. His later music, including the newest album Equinox, is mostly influenced by the European hip-hop scene, especially hip-hop from Marseille, France, and Austrian rap from Vienna. Songs he sings are grounded in life and ordinary subjects such as working far away from home, homesickness, dreams of enrichment, sociopolitical views of a man from the street. In his music, you can hear the influence of Linkin Park, JuL, and RAF Camora. But the biggest influence was, by his own words his mentor Kolateral, Rijad Fazlic, the deceased music producer of Sarajevo's music scene.

== Discography ==
Shiye has released two studio albums:

- Silhouette, 2018
- Equinox, 2020
