= Adi Lukovac =

Bosnian musician

- Born: 9 September 1970
- Origin: Sarajevo, Bosnia and Herzegovina
- Died: June 18, 2006 (aged 35); Ilidža, Bosnia and Herzegovina
- Genres: Industrial, ambient, ethnoambient, dub, dark wave
- Occupations: Musician, producer
- Instruments: Sampler, keyboard, turntables, synthesizer, vocals
- Years active: 1991–2006
- Labels: EMI (Italy), Dallas Records, Gramofon, Magaza, Post War Sound Records
- Formerly of: Adi Lukovac & The Ornaments

Adi Lukovac (9 September 1970 – 18 June 2006) was a Bosnian musician, best known as the pioneer of electronic music in Bosnia and Herzegovina and leader of the Bosnian industrial band Adi Lukovac & The Ornaments.

Lukovac founded the band Ornamenti (The Ornaments) during the war in Bosnia and Herzegovina 1992. In 1996 he founded the label Post War Sound Records (PWS). With the band Ornamenti, two albums were recorded: Pomjeranja (Movements) in 1999 and Fluid in 2001. He had also worked on many other music projects as a solo artist.

On June 18, 2006, Lukovac died in a car accident near the town Ilidža, Bosnia and Herzegovina.

== Biography ==
Adi Lukovac was born 1970 in Sarajevo. He attended the High School of Tourism and Catering in Sarajevo and later he attended the University of Sarajevo. First he studied Philosophy and later Economics but he never graduated. His first musical experience is related to the band Base Line, the first Bosnian electronic-experimental band. Bass Line recorded a demo tape at the beginning of the war in Bosnia and Herzegovina.

In 1992 he founded the band Ornamenti, his main musical project. Soon they became successful, and in 1993 their song "Rock Under Siege" was used as the title of the music compilation of Radio Zid. By the end of the war they had recorded their first demo tape Na dan naše smrti (On the day of our death).

After the war, Adi founded the label "Post War Sound Records". In 1999 they released their first album named Pomjeranja (Movements). The album was a great success so the band became very popular on the former Yugoslavian alternative scene. A number of tracks from the album were played on his BBC radio show by DJ John Peel even though it was unavailable in the UK. They have also collaborated with Dino Merlin on his album Sredinom.

His last album with Ornamenti was Fluid released in 2001. The album was released for the international scene. It was printed by Sony Austria and released by PWS Records in Bosnia and Herzegovina. In Italy, the album was released by EMI.

His most important project was the soundtrack for the 2003 Bosnian film Remake. It was Adi's last music project and the most successful one.

Adi died on June 18, 2006, in a car accident near the town of Blažuj, Bosnia and Herzegovina.

== Discography ==
=== Studio albums ===
- Pomjeranja (Movements) (1999)
- Fluid (2001)

=== Demos ===
- Na dan naše smrti (On the day we all died) (1995)

=== Soundtracks ===
- Remake (2003)

=== Compilations ===
- My Left Pussy Foot – compilation of Pussyfoot Records (UK) (1999)
- Il Ponte – compilation of Festival Musicale del Mediterraneo Italy (1999)
- RFI Electronic Music Awards – compilation for RFI Electronic Music Awards (2001)
