= Kamerni teatar 55 =

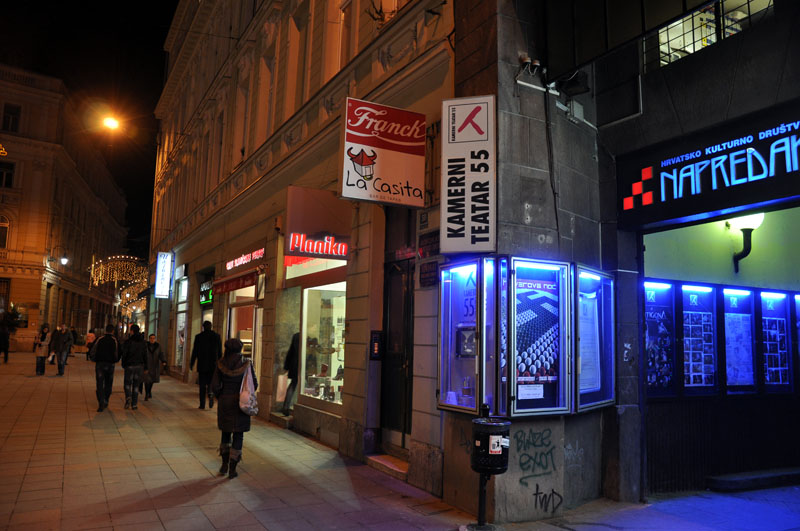
- Entrance to theater
- Interactive map of Kamerni teatar 55
- Address: Maršala Tita 55/II; Sarajevo; Bosnia and Herzegovina
- Coordinates: 43.858508°N 18.421318°E
- Capacity: 160

Construction
- Opened: March 7, 1955
- Years active: 71 years ago

Website
- Official website

Kamerni teatar 55 (English: Chamber Theater 55) is a theater in Sarajevo, established in 1955. It is registered as public institution under the Ministry of Culture and Sport of Canton Sarajevo.

On average, around 13,000 people view performances throughout the year, and the capacity of the theater is 160 seats.

Zlatko Topčić managed this theater from 2001 to 2011.
