= Koch (surname) =

Koch (/koʊk, kɒtʃ, kɒx, kʊk/ KOHK, KOTCH, KOKH, KUUK, US also /kɔːk/ KAWK, German: [kɔx]) is a German surname that means "cook" or "chef".

Notable people with the surname include:

== A–D ==
- Aaron Koch (born 1978), American football player
- Adam Koch (born 1988), American basketball player
- Adelheid Koch (1896–1980), German-Brazilian psychoanalyst
- Adolf Koch (1896–1970), German advocate for nudism in physical education
- Adrienne Koch (1913–1971), American historian
- Alan Koch (baseball) (1938–2015), American baseball player
- Alan Koch (soccer) (born 1975), South African soccer coach
- Alanna Koch, Canadian politician
- Alexander Koch (actor) (born 1988), American actor
- Alexander Koch (fencer) (born 1969), German fencer
- Alexander Koch (rower) (born 1967), Swiss rower
- Alfred Koch (born 1961), Russian writer, mathematician-economist, and businessman
- Alfred Michael Koch (1894–1918), Swiss-born Canadian flying ace
- Alston Koch (born 1951), Sri Lankan actor and musician
- Amy Koch (born 1971), American politician
- Andreas Koch (born 1966), Austrian footballer
- Anton Friedrich Koch (born 1952), German philosopher and academic
- Aubrey Koch (1904–1975), Australian RAF officer
- Barbara Koch (born 1957), Professor
- Barney Koch (1923–1987), American baseball player
- Barton Koch (1907–1964), American football player
- Beat Koch (born 1972), Swiss cross-country skier
- Beate Koch (born 1967), East German javelin thrower
- Bennett Koch (born 1995), American basketball player
- Bernward Koch (born 1957), Musical artist
- Berthold Koch (1899–1988), German chess player
- Bill Koch (American football), American football coach
- Bill Koch (businessman) (born 1940), American businessman and sailor
- Bill Koch (skier) (born 1955), American skier
- Billy Koch (born 1974), American baseball pitcher
- Blake Koch (born 1985), American racing driver
- Bob Koch, American politician
- Bobby Koch (born 1960), American lobbyist
- Bodil Koch (1903–1972), Danish politician
- Bubbles Koch (1921–2003), South African rugby union player
- Carin Koch (born 1971), Swedish professional golfer
- Carl Koch (architect) (1912–1998), American architect
- Carl Koch (director) (1892–1963), German art historian, director and writer
- Carl Ludwig Koch (1778–1857), German arachnologist
- Carolyn Koch (born 1967), American sports shooter
- Carsten Koch (musician) (born 1975), German organist, choral conductor and academic
- Carsten Koch (politician) (born 1945), Danish economist and politician
- Cary Koch (born 1986), American gridiron football player
- Cees Koch (canoeist) (1925–2024), Dutch canoeist
- Cees Koch (discus thrower) (1936–2021), Dutch discus thrower and shot putter
- Charles Koch (born 1935), American businessman and philanthropist
- Chase Koch (born 1977), American businessman
- Chris Koch (director) (born 1950), American film and television director
- Chris Koch (rugby union) (1927–1986), South African rugby union player
- Christian Friedrich Koch (1798–1872), German jurist
- Christiane Koch (born 1973), German physicist and researcher
- Christina Koch (born 1979), American astronaut, first woman to circle the Moon
- Christof Koch (born 1956), American neurophysiologist
- Christoph Wilhelm von Koch (1737–1813), French politician and diplomat
- Christopher Koch (1932–2013), Australian novelist
- Ciril Metod Koch (1867–1925), Slovene architect
- Claus Koch (born 1953), German sports shooter
- Colleen G. Koch, American cardiothoracic anesthesiologist and academic administrator
- Conrad Koch, South African comedian and ventriloquist
- Cooper Koch (born 1996), American actor
- Dagfinn Koch (born 1964), Norwegian composer
- Dan Koch (born 1983), American guitarist
- Daniel Koch (physician) (born 1955), Swiss physician and federal employee
- Daniel Koch (politician) (1816–1903), American politician
- David Koch (1940–2019), American businessman and philanthropist
- David Koch (Australian politician) (born 1949), Australian politician
- David Koch (television presenter) (born 1956), Australian television presenter
- Des Koch (1932–1991), American athletics competitor
- Dieter-Lebrecht Koch (born 1953), German politician
- Dolores M. Koch (1928–2009), Cuban-American literary critic and translator
- Donovan Koch (born 1976), South African cricket umpire
- Dorothy Bush Koch (born 1959), American writer and philanthropist
- Douglas Koch, Canadian cinematographer

== E–J ==
- Ebba Koch (born 1944), Austrian art and architectural historian
- Ed Koch (1924–2013), Mayor of New York City from 1978 to 1989
- Edeltraud Koch (born 1954), German swimmer
- Eduard Emil Koch (1809–1871), German pastor and hymnologist
- Edward Albert Koch (born 1843), Australian medical practitioner
- Ehrhardt Koch (1886–1954), German-American businessman
- Eleonore Koch (1926–2018), Brazilian painter and sculptor
- Elisa Koch (1833–1914), Italian painter
- Elizabeth Koch (born 1986), American oboist
- Elizabeth Koch (publisher) (born 1976), American publisher and writer
- Emil Koch (1897–1978), Romanian footballer
- Eric Koch (1919–2018), Canadian author, broadcaster and academic
- Eric Koch (politician), American politician
- Erich Koch (1896–1986), Nazi leader
- Erik Koch (born 1988), American mixed martial arts fighter
- Erland Koch (German sport shooter) (1867–1945), German sport shooter
- Erland Koch (Swedish sport shooter) (1913–1972), Swedish sports shooter
- Erland von Koch (1910–2009), Swedish composer
- Ernő Koch (1898–1970), Hungarian artist
- Eva Koch (born 1953), Danish sculptor
- F. H. B. Koch, Ceylonese (Sri Lankan) judge and lawyer
- Fabian Koch (born 1989), Austrian footballer
- Ferne Koch (1913–2001), American photographer
- Florian Koch (born 1992), German basketball player
- Flury Koch (born 1945), Swiss cross-country skier
- Franz Koch (cinematographer) (1898–1959), German cinematographer
- Franz Koch (writer) (1888–1969), germanist
- Franziska Koch (cyclist) (born 2000), German cyclist
- Franziska Romana Koch (1748–1796), German opera singer
- Fred C. Koch (1900–1967), American chemical engineer and entrepreneur
- Fred Conrad Koch (1876–1948), American biochemist
- Freddy Koch (1916–1980), Danish actor
- Frederick R. Koch (1933–2020), American philanthropist
- Friedrich Koch (1862–1927), German composer, cellist and teacher
- Friedrich Koch (general) (1879–1961), German general
- Fritz Koch (born 1956), Austrian ski jumper
- Gabriel Koch (1807–1881), German entomologist
- Gabriel Koch (ice hockey) (born 2004), Norwegian ice hockey player
- Gabriele Koch (born 1948), German artist
- Gaetano Koch (1849–1910), Italian architect
- Gary Koch (born 1952), American professional golfer
- Gary Grove Koch (born 1942), American biostatistician
- Georg Koch (1972–2026), German footballer
- Georg Aenotheus Koch (1802–1879), German classical philologist and lexicographer
- Georg Karl Koch (1857–1927), German painter, illustrator and lithographer
- George Koch (1919–1966), American football player
- George W. Koch (1871–1908), American politician
- Gerald Koch (born 1968), German wood scientist and professor
- Gerd Koch (1922–2005), German cultural anthropologist
- Gertrud Koch (1924–2016), German resistance fighter
- Gini Koch, American novelist
- Gottlieb von Koch (1849–1914), German zoologist
- Grant Koch (born 1997), American baseball player
- Greg Koch (born 1955), American football player
- Greg Koch (musician) (born 1966), American guitarist
- Hannes Koch (1935–1994), German racewalker
- Hans Koch (footballer), Swiss footballer
- Hans Koch (lawyer) (1893–1945), German resistance member
- Hans Koch (musician) (born 1948)
- Hans Koch (SS officer) (1912–1955), German WWII war criminal
- Hans Jørgen Koch (born 1946), Danish energy official
- Hans-Hinrich Koch (born 1970), German producer
- Hans-Karl Koch (1897–1934), German Nazi & SA general
- Hans-Reinhard Koch (1929–2018), German Catholic priest and theologian
- Harald Koch (born 1969), Austrian badminton player
- Harold M. Koch (born 1932), American priest who defected to the Soviet Union
- Harry Koch (businessman) (1867–1942), American businessman
- Harry Koch (German footballer) (born 1969), German footballer and coach
- Harry Koch (Swiss footballer) (1930–2012), Swiss footballer
- Harry Eduard Ottokar Koch (1880–1939), Estonian politician
- Hartmut Koch (born 1944), East German sprinter
- Hawk Koch (born 1945), American film producer
- Heidemarie Koch (1943–2022), German Iranologist
- Heidi Koch (born 1962), Austrian swimmer
- Heiner Koch (born 1954), German prelate of the Catholic Church
- Heinrich Koch (born 1962), German politician
- Heinrich Christoph Koch (1749–1816), German musicologist and composer
- Heinz Koch (born 1949), German footballer
- Helen L. Koch (1895–1977), American psychologist
- Helene Koch (born 1967), Swedish professional golfer
- Helga Koch (born 1942), German fencer
- Helge von Koch (1870–1924), Swedish mathematician
- Helmut Koch (1932–2024), German mathematician
- Helmut Koch (conductor) (1908–1975), German conductor and choir leader
- Henny Koch (1854–1925), German children's author and translator
- Henri Koch (bobsledder) (1904–1954), Luxembourgish bobsledder
- Henriette Koch (born 1985), Danish sailor
- Henrik Koch (born 1964), Danish researcher, theoretical chemistry
- Henry C. Koch (1841–1910), American architect
- Herbert Koch (born 1962), German mathematician
- Herbert Koch (archaeologist) (1880–1962), German archaeologist
- Heribert Koch (born 1969), Swiss footballer
- Herman Koch (born 1953), Dutch writer and actor
- Hermann Koch (painter) (1856–1939), German painter
- Hermann Georg Willibald Koch (1882–1957), Estonian politician
- Hilton Koch (born 1967), American furniture store owner
- Howard Koch (screenwriter) (1901–1995), American playwright and screenwriter
- Howard W. Koch (1916–2001), Film producer
- Hugo Koch (1870–1928), Dutch inventor
- Ilse Koch (1906–1967), German war criminal
- Ina Koch (born 1958), German bioinformatician
- Inge Koch (figure skater) (born 2000), German figure skater
- Inge Koch (statistician), Australian statistician
- Ingedore Grünfeld Villaça Koch (1933–2018), Brazilian linguist
- Ingmar Koch (born 2000), German musician
- J. R. Koch (born 1976), American basketball player
- Jan Koch (born 1995), German footballer
- Jennifer A. Koch, American internist
- Jens Koch (born 1981), German photographer
- Jerry Koch (1933–2019), American basketball player
- Jerry Koch (Nebraska politician) (1924–2007), American politician
- Jesper Koch (born 1967), Danish composer
- Jim Koch (born 1949), American businessman
- Johan Koch (born 1990), Danish handball player
- Johan Peter Koch (1870–1928), Danish captain & explorer
- Johann August Hermann (John) Koch (1850–1934), German philologist
- Johann Heinrich Koch (Hessian mercenary) (1748–1801), Hessian soldier in the Revolutionary War
- Johann von Koch (1850–1915), German architect
- John Koch (1909–1978), American painter
- John A. B. Koch (1845–1928), Australian architect
- John C. Koch (1841–1907), 19th century American politician
- John Herman Koch (1864–1929), American politician
- John T. Koch (born 1953), American historian and linguist
- Jonas Koch (born 1993), German road cyclist
- Jonathan Koch (producer), American television producer
- Jonathan Koch (rower) (born 1985), German lightweight rower
- Jørgen Hansen Koch (1787–1860), Danish architect
- Joseph Koch (1843–1902), American lawyer and politician
- Joseph Anton Koch (1768–1839), Austrian painter
- Julia Koch (born 1962), American socialite and philanthropist
- Julian Koch (born 1990), German footballer
- Julius Koch (1872–1902), German giant
- Julius Arnold Koch (1864–1956), American chemist
- Julius August Koch (1752–1817), German astronomer and physician
- Julius Ludwig August Koch (1841–1908), German psychiatrist
- Jürgen Koch (born 1973), Austrian badminton player
- Jurij Koch (born 1936), German writer

== K-W ==
- Karel František Koch (1890–1981), Czech doctor and humanitarian
- Karen Koch (born 1951), American ice hockey player
- Karen Koch (plant biologist), Plant biologist
- Karl Koch (botanist) (1809–1879), German botanist
- Karl Koch (cyclist) (1910–1944), German cyclist
- Karl Koch (hacker) (1965–1989), German hacker
- Karl Koch (Weezer assistant) (born 1969), Assistant to the band Weezer
- Karl Christian Koch (born 1952), Danish swimmer
- Karl-Otto Koch (1897–1945), German SS officer
- Karl-Rudolf Koch (born 1935), German geodesist
- Károly Koch (born 1885), Hungarian coxswain
- Karsten Koch (born 1977), German darts player
- Kenneth Koch (1925–2002), American poet
- Kenton Koch, American racing driver
- Klaus Koch (1926–2019), German theologian
- Klaus-Friedrich Koch (1937–1979), German-American academic
- Konrad Koch (1846–1911), German teacher and football pioneer
- Kurt Koch (born 1950), Swiss Roman Catholic cardinal
- Kurt Koch (football manager) (1919–2000), German football manager
- Kurt Koch (sport shooter) (born 1960), Swiss sports shooter
- Kurt E. Koch (1913–1987), German theologian
- Kyle Koch (born 1984), Canadian football player
- Lambert T. Koch (born 1965), German economist and university professor
- Lars Koch, Danish canoeist
- Lauge Koch (1892–1964), Danish geologist and Arctic explorer
- Laura Vargas Koch (born 1990), German judoka
- Lene Koch (born 1947), Danish feminist academic
- Leo Koch (1916–1982), American biologist
- Leonard Koch (born 1995), German football player
- Linda Koch, German-French geneticist
- Lise Koch (1938–2004), Danish javelin thrower
- Lloyd Koch (1931–2013), South African cricketer
- Lothar Koch (musician) (1935–2003), German oboist
- Lothar Koch (politician) (1939–2023), German politician
- Lotte Koch (1913–2013), German actress
- Louis Koch (born 1903), Swiss bobsledder
- Lucien Koch (born 1996), Swiss snowboarder
- Ludwig Koch (painter) (1866–1934), Austrian artist
- Ludwig Koch (sound recordist) (1881–1974), British broadcaster and wildlife sound recordist
- Ludwig Carl Christian Koch (1825–1908), German entomologist and arachnologist
- Luise Koch (1860–1934), German educator, politician and activist
- Lydia Lunch (born 1959), American musician, born Lydia Konch
- Lydie Koch-Miramond (1931–2023), French astrophysicist
- Magdalena Koch (born 1958), Polish academic
- Manu Koch (born 1972), Swiss pianist, keyboardist and composer
- Marc Koch (born 1994), German athlete
- Marco Koch (born 1990), German swimmer
- Marianne Koch (born 1931), German actress
- Marita Koch (born 1957), German sprint track and field athlete
- Mariza Koch (born 1944), Greek singer
- Markus Koch (born 1963), German gridiron football player
- Martin Koch (cyclist) (1887–1961), German cyclist
- Martin Koch (novelist) (1882–1940), Swedish novelist
- Martin Koch (orchestrator), Musical artist
- Martin Koch (ski jumper) (born 1982), Austrian ski jumper
- Martina Koch (golfer) (born 1965), German professional golfer
- Máté Tamás Koch (born 1999), Hungarian fencer
- Matt Koch (born 1990), American baseball player
- Matthew Koch (born 1978), American politician
- Matthias Koch (born 1988), Austrian footballer
- Max Koch (1854–1925), Australian botanist
- Max Koch (academic) (1855–1931), German historian and literary critic
- Max Friedrich Koch (1859–1930), German painter
- Maxl Koch (born 1959), German sailor
- Meinolf Koch (born 1957), German footballer
- Menno Koch (born 1994), Dutch footballer
- Michael Koch (basketball) (born 1966), German basketball player and coach
- Michael Koch (film director) (born 1982), Swiss film director and screenwriter
- Michael Koch (footballer) (born 1969), German footballer
- Michael Koch (handballer) (born 1942), Swedish handball player
- Michel Koch (born 1991), German cyclist
- Mike Koch (racing driver) (born 1963), American racing driver
- Mogens Koch (1898–1992), Danish architect and furniture designer
- Nils Samuel von Koch (1801–1881), Swedish civil servant and Chancellor of Justice
- Noppie Koch (1932–2010), Dutch cyclist
- Norma Koch (1898–1979), American costume designer
- Nynne Koch (1915–2001), Danish gender studies researcher and novelist
- Olaf Koch (born 1970), German Manager
- Olaf Koch (conductor) (1932–2001), German conductor
- Olga Koch (born 1992), Russian-born British stand-up comedian
- Oscar Koch (1897–1970), United States Army general
- Patrik Koch (born 1996), Slovak ice hockey player
- Paul Koch (cyclist) (1897–1959), German cyclist
- Paul Koch (footballer) (born 1966), Luxembourgish footballer
- Paulie Koch (born 1996), American world champion wakeboarder
- Payton Koch (born 1996), American film editor
- Per Axel Koch (born 1961), Norwegian media executive
- Pete Koch (born 1962), American actor and football player
- Peter Koch (wood scientist) (1920–1998), American wood scientist
- Peter Rutledge Koch (born 1943), American printmaker, publisher, designer
- Philip Koch (born 1948), American artist
- Philippe Koch (born 1991), Swiss footballer
- Pierre Koch (1895–1978), French civil engineer
- Pietro Koch (1918–1945), Italian police officer
- Polly Koch (1895–1976), American football player
- Pyke Koch (1901–1991), Dutch painter
- Rainer Koch (born 1958), German jurist and football official
- Raphael Koch (born 1990), Swiss footballer
- René Koch (1895–1978), French sports shooter
- Richard Koch (born 1950), British management consultant
- Richard Koch (architect) (1889–1971), American architectural preservationist
- Richard H. Koch (1852–1945), American judge and railroad magnate
- Richert Vogt von Koch (1838–1913), Swedish military officer
- Rickard Koch (born 1976), Swedish bandy player
- Robert Koch (1843–1910), German physician and bacteriologist
- Robert Koch (footballer) (born 1986), German footballer
- Robin Koch (born 1996), German footballer
- Robot Koch (born 1977), German record producer
- Roger Koch, American politician
- Roland Koch (born 1958), German jurist and politician
- Roland Koch (footballer) (born 1952), German football coach
- Roman Koch (born 1958), German sailor
- Roscoe R. Koch (1887–1963), American politician
- Rosslyn Koch (born 1886), Ceylonese businessman, company director and politician
- Rudolf Koch (1876–1934), German type designer and calligrapher
- Sam Koch (born 1982), American football player and coach
- Sam Koch (soccer) (1955–2014), American soccer coach
- Samuel Koch (born 1987), German actor
- Sarah Koch (born 1979), American mathematician
- Sebastian Koch (born 1962), German film and television actor
- Sebastian Koch (politician), German politician
- Shari Koch (born 1993), German ice dancer
- Simona Koch (born 1968), German retired diver
- Simone Koch (born 1969), German figure skater
- Sophie Koch (born 1969), French operatic mezzo-soprano
- Sophie Koch (canoeist) (born 1997), German sprint canoer
- Sophie Koch (politician) (born 1993), German politician
- Stefan Koch (born 1964), German basketball coach
- Stefanie Koch (born 1981), German ski mountaineer
- Stephan W. Koch (1953–2022), German theoretical physicist
- Stephen Koch (born 1968), American snowboarder
- Stephen Koch (writer) (1941–2026), American author and academic
- Susan Koch (born 1943), American nuclear reduction expert
- Susanna Koch (born 1987), Austrian footballer
- Tanit Koch (born 1977), German journalist
- Theodor Koch (1905–1976), German engineer
- Theodore Wesley Koch (1871–1941), American librarian
- Thomas Koch (ice hockey) (born 1983), Austrian ice hockey player
- Thomas F. Koch (born 1942), American politician
- Thomas P. Koch (born 1963), 33rd Mayor of Quincy, Massachusetts
- Thomaz Koch (born 1945), Brazilian tennis player
- Tobias Koch (footballer) (born 2001), Austrian footballer
- Tobias Koch (pianist) (born 1968), German musician
- Tobias Koch (politician) (born 1973), German politician
- Tom Koch (1925–2015), American humorist and writer
- Ulrich Koch (1921–1996), German violinist
- Ulrike Koch (1950–2024), German sinologist and filmmaker
- Ursula Koch (born 1941), Swiss politician
- Valdemar Koch (1852–1902), Danish architect and politician
- Vincent Koch (born 1990), South African rugby union player
- Vivienne Koch (born 1999), Swiss synchronized swimmer
- Waldemar Koch (1880–1963), German politician and economist
- Walter Koch (astrologer) (1895–1970), German astrologer
- Walter Koch (paratrooper) (1910–1943), Fallschirmjäger of World War II
- Walter Koch (physician) (1880–1962), German pathologist
- Walter Koch (politician) (1870–1947), German diplomat, lawyer and politician
- Walter J. Koch (born 1961), American scientist
- Werner Koch (born 1961), German free software developer
- Werner Koch (pastor) (1910–1994), German journalist and theologian (1910-1994)
- Wilfred Miller Vincent Koch (1862–1939), British surgeon
- Wilhelm Daniel Joseph Koch (1771–1849), German physician and botanist
- Wilhelmina Koch (1845–1924), German composer
- William C. Koch Jr. (born 1947), American judge
- William Frederick Koch (1885–1967), U.S. medical doctor and pharmaceutical entrepreneur
- Wolfgang Koch (born 1966), German bass-baritone
- Wolfgang Koch (computer scientist) (born 1962), German physicist and computer scientist

== See also ==
- Koch (disambiguation)
- Koç (disambiguation)
