= Kreševljaković =

- Language: Bosnian

Kreševljaković is a surname. Notable people with the surname include:

- Hamdija Kreševljaković (1888–1959), Bosnian historian
- Muhamed Kreševljaković (1939–2001), Bosnian politician
- Nihad Kreševljaković (1977), Bosnian historian
