= Paul Koch =

Paul Koch may refer to:

- Paul Koch (cyclist) (1897–1959), German cyclist
- Paul Koch (footballer) (born 1966), Luxembourg footballer
- Paul Koch (runner) (born ?), American runner in the 2006 World Long Distance Mountain Running Challenge

== See also ==
- Paulie Koch (born 1996), American wakeboarder
- Paul Koech (1969–2018), Kenyan distance and marathon runner
- Paul Kipsiele Koech (born 1981), Kenyan runner
