= Inge Koch =

Inge Koch may refer to:

- Inge Koch (figure skater)
- Inge Koch (statistician)
