= Nihad Kreševljaković =

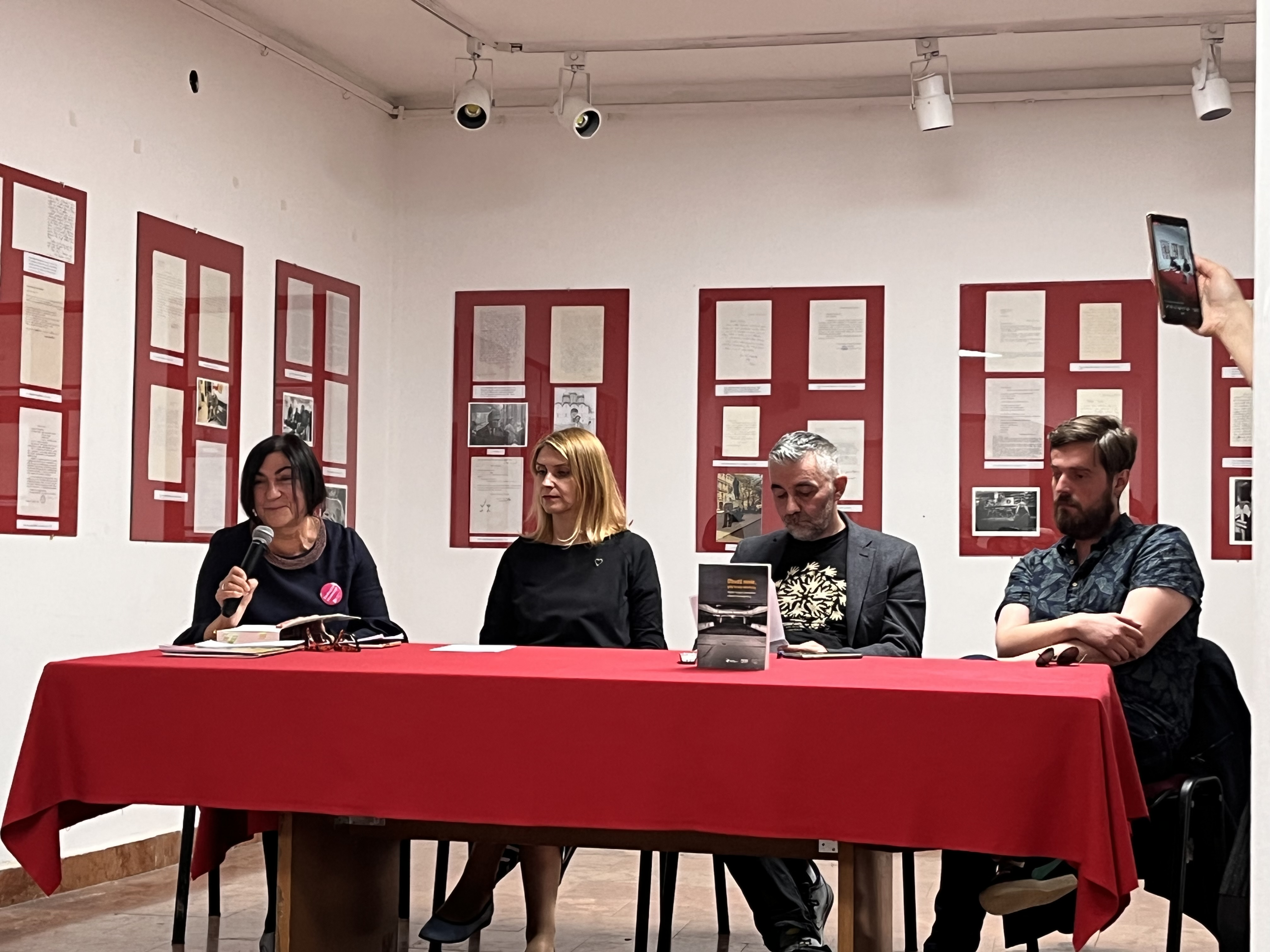
Magdalena Koch, Dominika Kaniecka, Nihad Kreševljaković, Adnan Lugonić (2022)

Nihad Kreševljaković (born 24 February 1973) is a Bosnian historian, producer, screenwriter and director of the Sarajevo War Theatre.

== Biography ==
Kreševljaković was born in Sarajevo, SFR Yugoslavia. He enrolled at the University of Sarajevo, Faculty of Philosophy where he studied history. He graduated in 1999, before earning his post-graduate degree from the same institution four years later. He further studied Comparative literature. He has worked as a producer for the MESS International Theatre Festival, before being named director of the festival. In 2011 he founded the Videoarhiv documentary film production company with his brother Sead. In 2012 he was named director of the Sarajevo War Theatre. He has worked as a screenwriter on numerous film projects. In 2019, Kreševljaković was awarded the KAIROS Prize.

== Personal life ==
His grandfather Hamdija Kreševljaković was a renowned Bosnian historian. His father Muhamed Kreševljaković was the war-time mayor of Sarajevo. His twin brother Sead is a journalist, film producer and the honorary consule of San Marino in Bosnia and Herzegovina.
