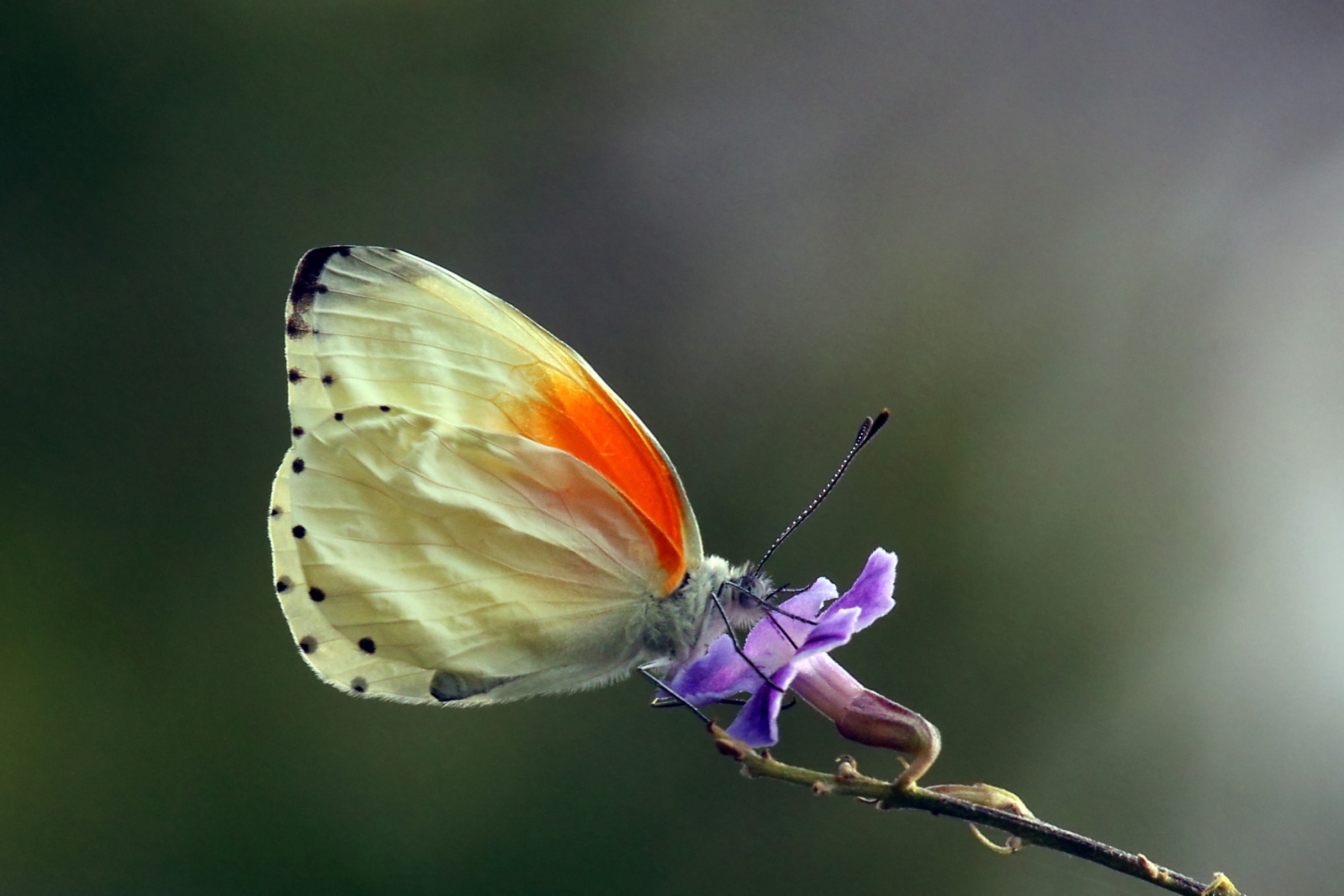
- M. r. haemus, Johannesburg, South Africa

Scientific classification
- Kingdom: Animalia
- Phylum: Arthropoda
- Clade: Pancrustacea
- Class: Insecta
- Order: Lepidoptera
- Family: Pieridae
- Genus: Mylothris
- Species: M. rueppellii

Binomial name
- Mylothris rueppellii (Koch, 1865)

Synonyms
- Pieris rueppellii Koch, 1865; Pieris haemus Trimen, 1879; Mylothris rueppellii kikuyuensis f. kaffana Riley, 1921; Mylothris ruppellii rhodesiana ab. pallidior Hulstaert, 1924; Mylothris rueppellii f. kikuyuensis Bartel, 1905; Mylothris rueppellii kikuyuensis f. kenia Riley, 1921; Mylothris ruppellii kikuyuensis ab. aspilota Hulstaert, 1924

= Mylothris rueppellii =

Species of butterfly

Mylothris rueppellii, the Rüppell's dotted border or twin dotted border, is a butterfly of the family Pieridae. It is found in most of Africa, south of the Sahara. The wingspan is 48–55 millimetres (1.9–2.2 in) for males and 50–56 mm (2.0–2.2 in) for females. Adults are on wing year-round, with peaks in October and from late February to April in southern Africa. The larvae feed on various Loranthaceae species, including Loranthus, Tapinanthus oleifolius and Tapinanthus rubromarginatus.

It is named after the German naturalist Eduard Rüppell, who had travelled in Africa in 1830.

== Description ==
the upperside of the wings exhibits a striking characteristic where deep orange basal scaling covers, about half of the forewing cell. The underside of the wings features lighter shades of white or cream, accompanied by faint markings and patterns.

== Habitat ==
Mylothris rueppellii is typically found in habitats characterized by forests and densely wooded savannas. Both sexes prefer to fly high at the tree tops.

== Distribution ==
Nigeria, Sudan, Ethiopia, Democratic Republic of Congo, Uganda, Kenya, Tanzania, Malawi, Zambia, Angola, Mozambique, Zimbabwe, Botswana, South Africa and Swaziland.

== Lifecycle ==
Eggs of Mylothris rueppellii are deposited in clusters on the leaves of their host plants. Measuring approximately 0.7 mm in diameter and 1.1 mm in height, these eggs have a yellowish hue and are coated with a sticky substance. Each egg exhibits around 28 longitudinal ribs and about 26 cross ribs. Upon hatching, the first instar larvae emerge from the side of the eggs, typically near the top, and consume the remnants of their eggshells.

The life cycle of Mylothris rueppellii rueppellii encompasses several distinct instars. The first instar is characterized by its small size and limited mobility. It then progresses through subsequent instars, with each molt marking a transition to a more developed stage. By the third or fourth instar, the larva displays increased size, mobility, and distinct coloration, continuing to feed voraciously on its host plant.

After completing its final larval instar, Mylothris rueppellii rueppellii undergoes pupation. The larva attaches itself to a secure location by using cremastral hooks and a silken girdle, sheds its outer skin to reveal the chrysalis, and undergoes metamorphosis inside. The chrysalis, characterized by its smooth surface and cylindrical shape, serves as the cocoon for the transformation process.

As the adult butterfly emerges from the chrysalis, its wings start out soft and wrinkled. Over the next few hours, the butterfly pumps hemolymph, or insect blood, into its wings, allowing them to expand and solidify, preparing for flight.

== Diet ==
A diverse range of host plants from various families such as Loranthaceae and Olacaceae, are utilized by the larvae of Mylothris rueppellii.

== Subspecies ==
- M. r. rueppellii (highlands of Ethiopia)
- M. r. haemus (Trimen, 1879) (southern Mozambique, Zimbabwe, South Africa)
- M. r. josi Larsen, 1986 (Nigeria)
- M. r. rhodesiana Riley, 1921 (northern Mozambique, Malawi, Tanzania, Zambia, southern Zaire (Shaba), south-eastern Angola)
- M. r. septentrionalis Carpenter, 1928 (southern Sudan)
- M. r. tirikensis Neave, 1904 (highlands of Uganda, Kenya and northern Tanzania)

== Gallery ==
Images from gardens in Johannesburg, South Africa

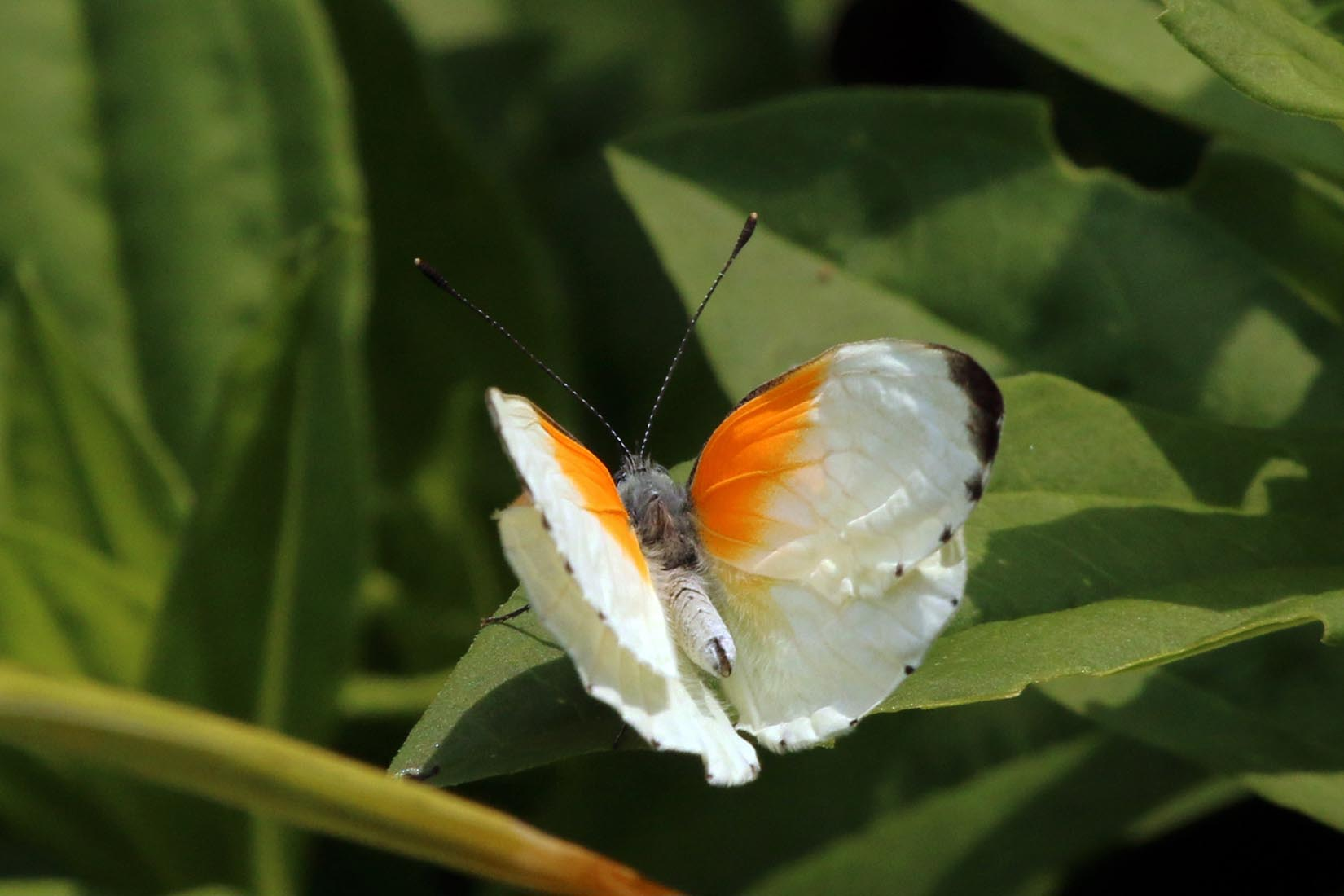
Male upperside

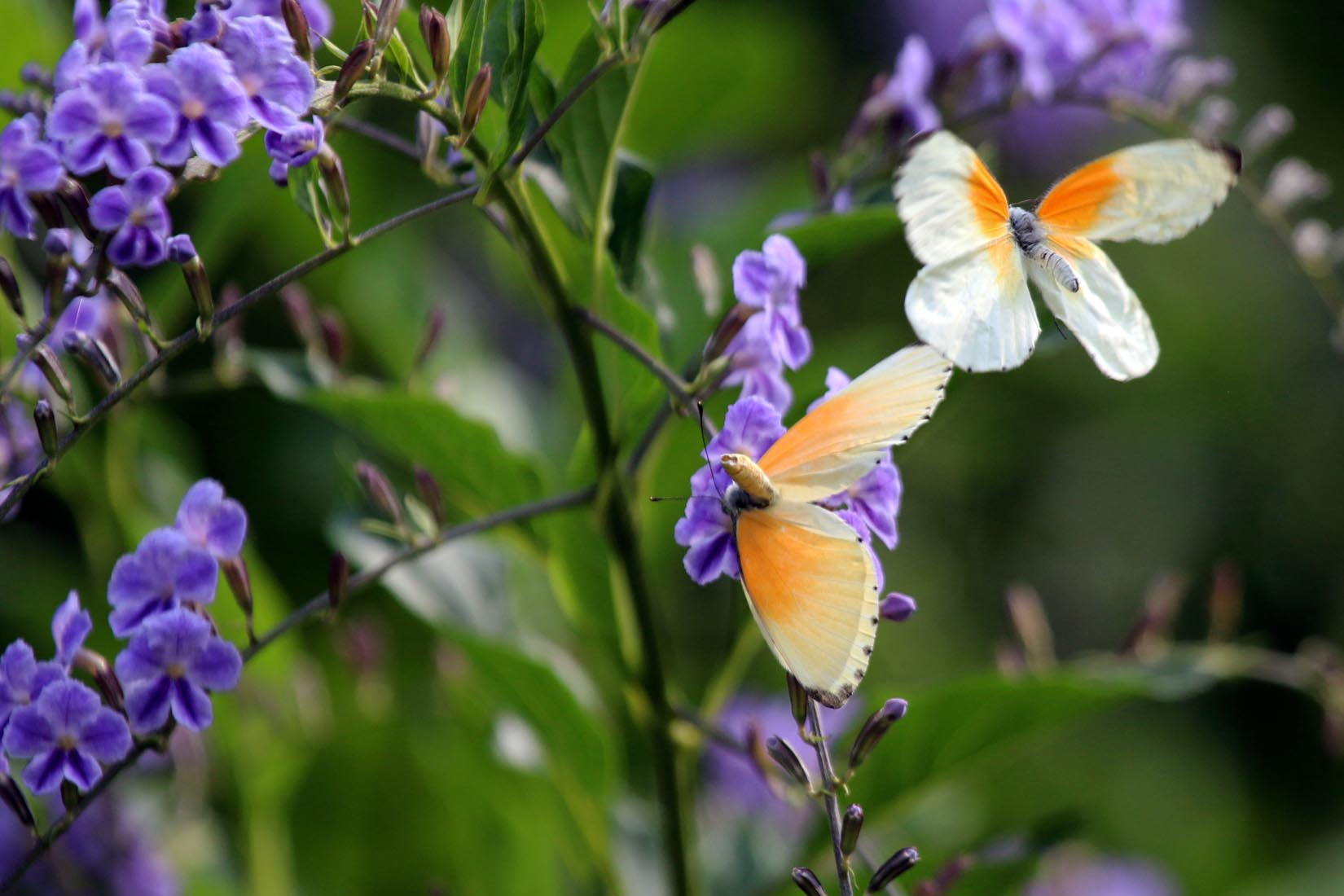
Male in flight

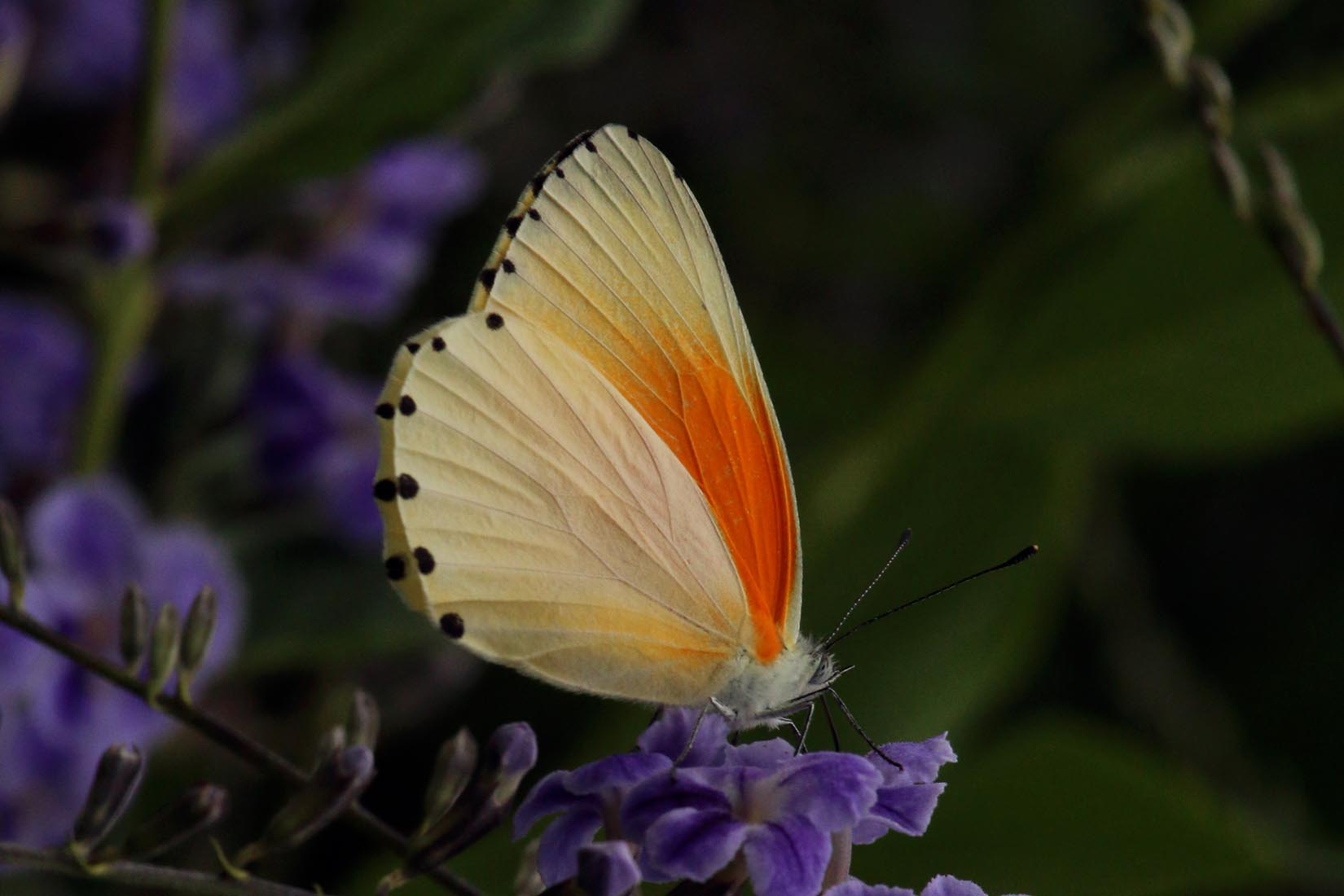
Female underside
