= Hermann Koch =

Hermann Koch may refer to:

- Hermann Georg Willibald Koch (1882–1957), Estonian politician
- Hermann Koch (politician) (1899–1984), German politician
- Hermann Koch (painter) (1856–1939), German painter

== See also ==
- Herman Koch (born 1953), Dutch writer
