= Katell Gélébart =

French artist, activist, educator and entrepreneur

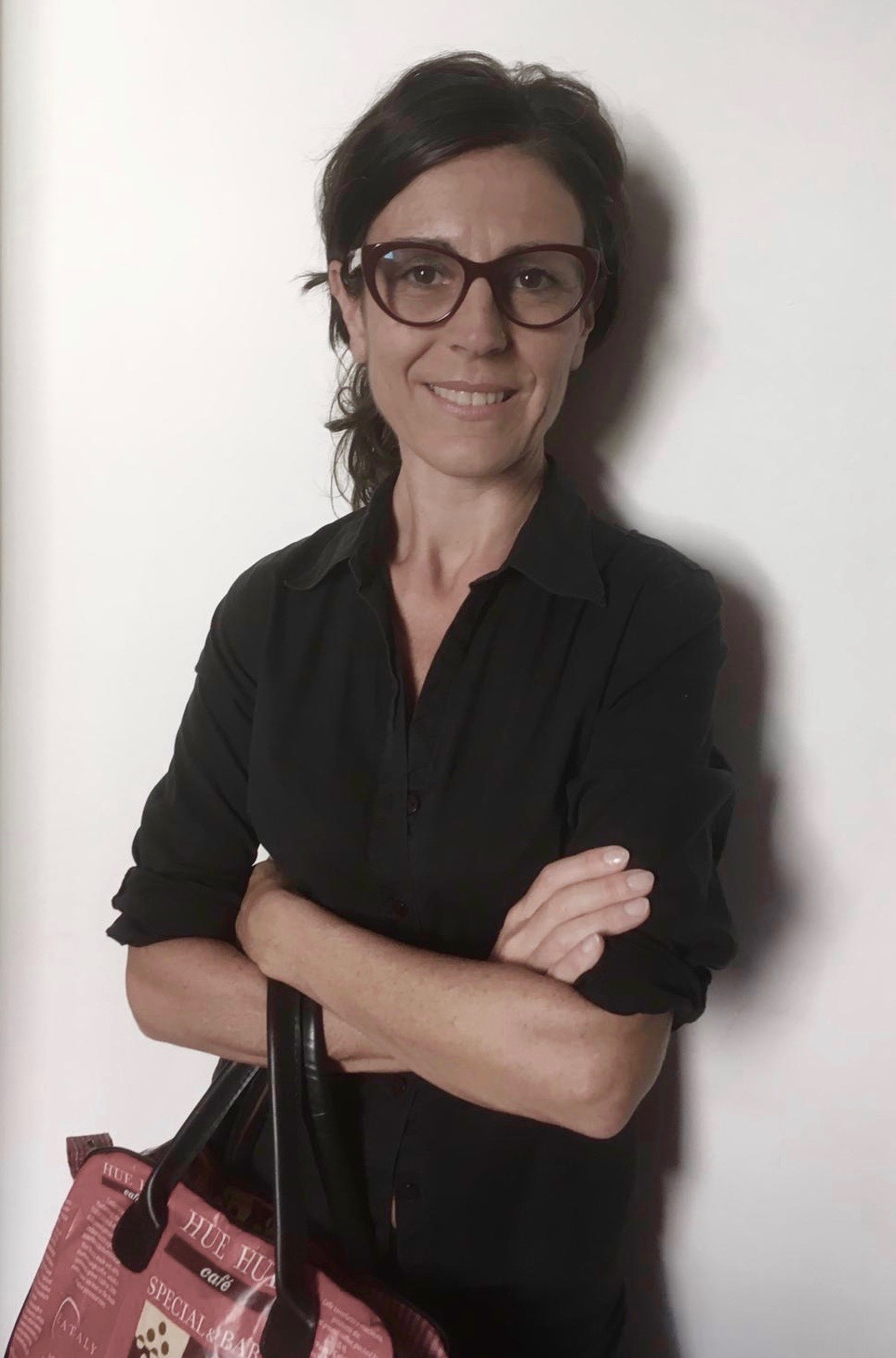
- Born: Brest, France
- Education: La Sorbonne University, École du Louvre
- Occupations: ecodesigner, artist, activist, educator, entrepreneur

Katell Gélébart is a French ecodesigner, artist, activist, educator and entrepreneur. She is best known for her fashion designs made from re-purposing unwanted materials.

== Biography ==
Gélébart was born in Brest, France. She graduated from La Sorbonne University in 1996 with a Master of Scandinavian Studies. She also attended the École du Louvre. In her 20s, she was an environmental campaigner, in the fields of nuclear issues, tropical wood, trade of endangered species etc. working for diverse grass roots organisations in Europe. In 1998, in Amsterdam, she founded ART D’ECO & DESIGN, her company specializing in fashion and other products made from refashioning and reusing wastes.

Gélébart currently teaches the module Men/Environment at NABA (the New Academy of Fine Arts) in Milan, Italy.

== Creations ==
Since 2004, Gélébart has been developing entire collections of garments and fashion accessories out of unwanted materials. Her media of work have expanded to include stationery collection and interior design.

She lectures in design academies around the world. She empowers people and craft people (specially in India) to create with their own waste.

She has had shows in many galleries around the world. Her major show was a retrospective : WAS DAT IS at the Museum für Kunst & Gewerbe, in Germany.

== Awards and presentations ==
In 2013, her biography in German "Die Mülldesignerin: wie Katell Gélébart die Welt verändert" has been published by SCORPIO and written by Christine Eichel.

In 2018, she published in English her autobiography The Freedom of Having Nothing, Ecodesigner and Global Nomad by Amazon.

In 2012, she was the recipient of the Kairos Prize, the European Cultural award by the A. Toepfer foundation (Hamburg). When receiving the award, she said of her work; "My work philosophy and ethic is to develop the potential of recycling/re-using of waste & unwanted materials in the field of design. My creations show that it is possible to combine design and re-use without creating raw material and generating more waste as a result of this process. My work is the embodiment of "ecodesign": the art of re-using and utilizing low tech’ means only. Via my company ART D’ECO & DESIGN, I implement my vision and inspire people to do alike"
