= Beechwood, Wisconsin =

- Unincorporated community
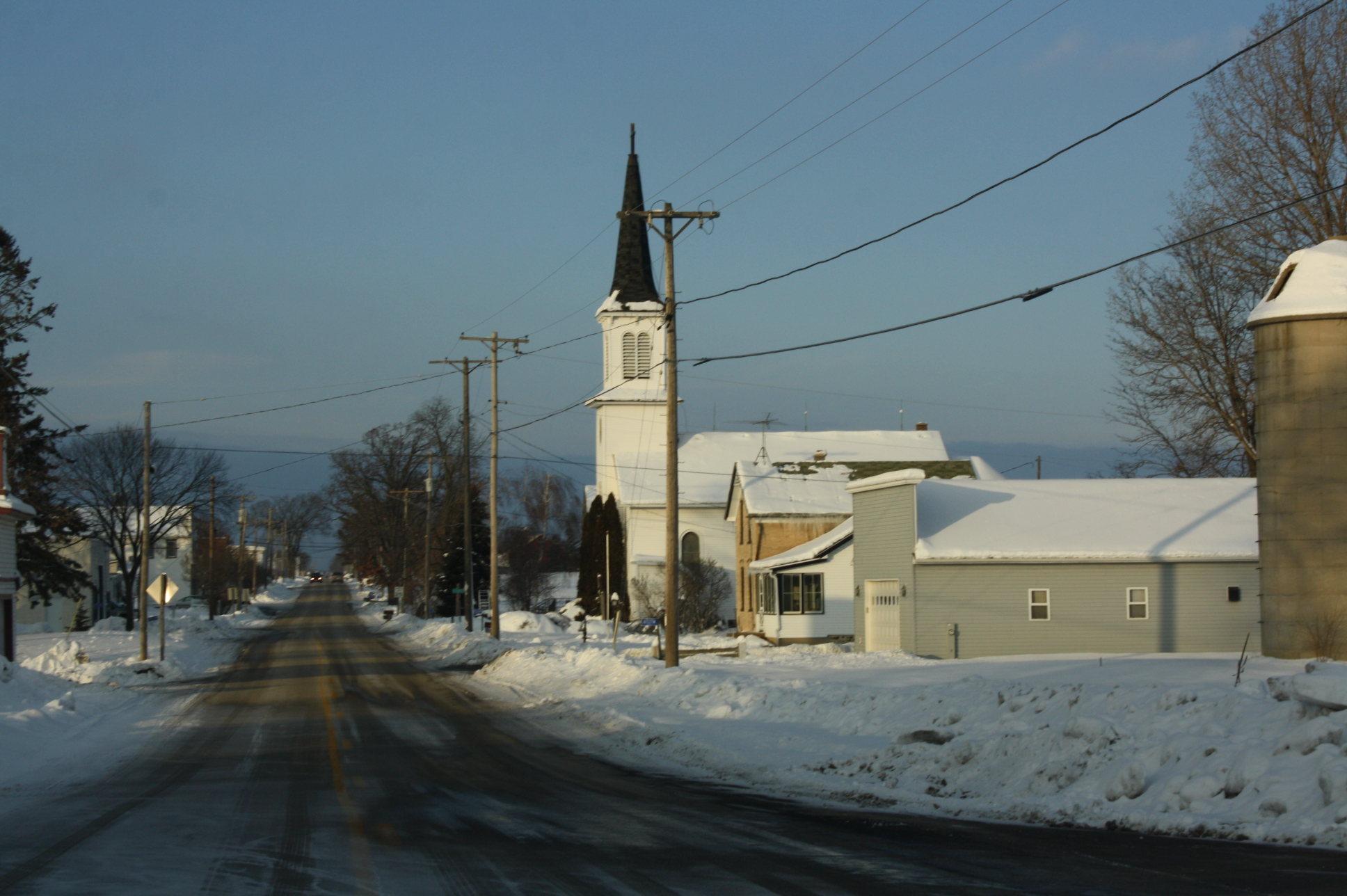
- Looking north in Beechwood

- Location within Wisconsin Location within the United States
- Coordinates: 43°35′34″N 88°07′13″W
- Country: United States
- State: Wisconsin
- County: Sheboygan
- Elevation: 1,030 ft (310 m)
- Time zone: UTC-6 (Central (CST))
  - Summer (DST): UTC-5 (CDT)
- Area code: 920
- GNIS feature ID: 1561498

Beechwood is an unincorporated community located in the town of Scott, Sheboygan County, Wisconsin, United States.

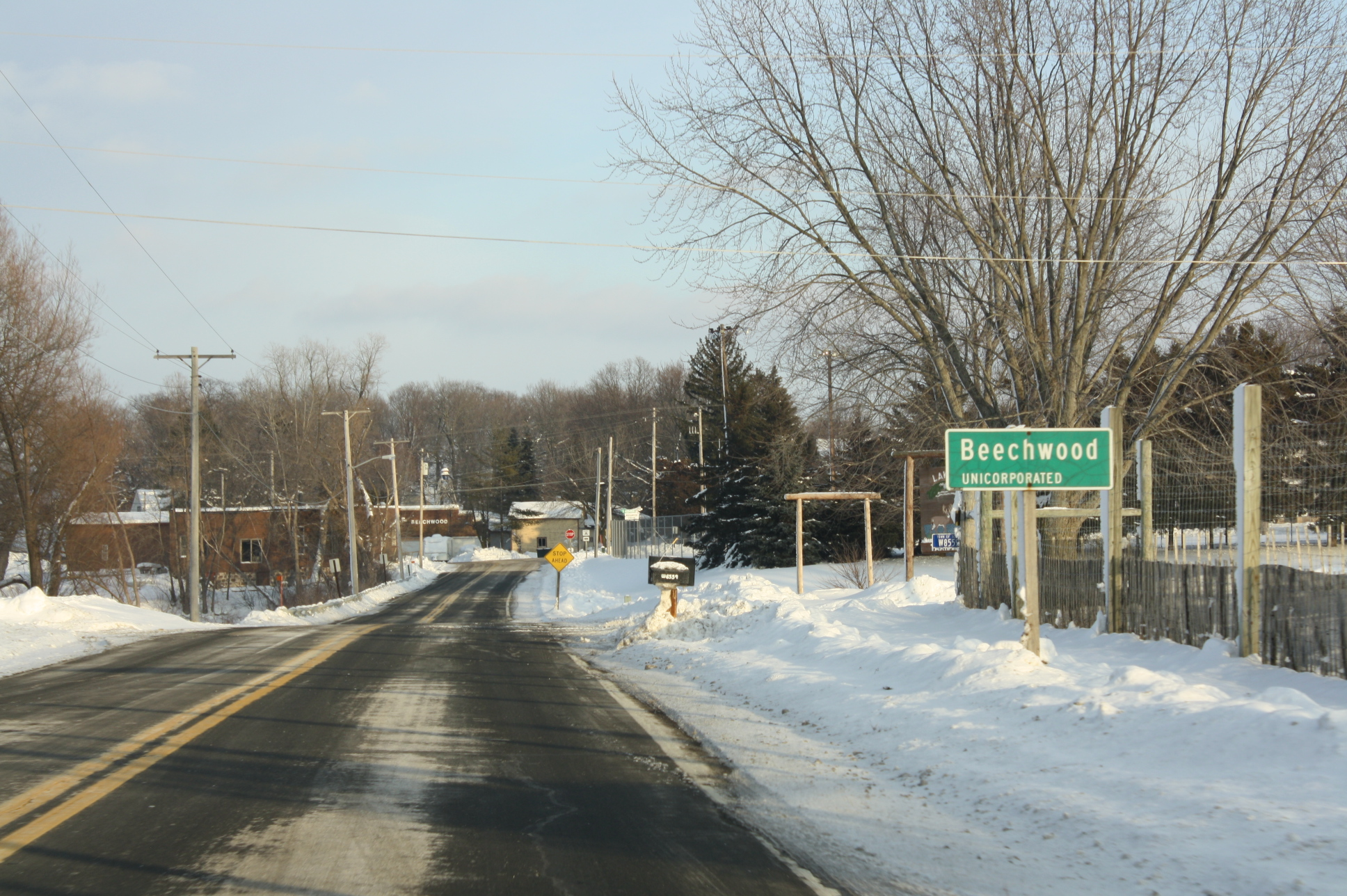
Looking east at the sign for Beechwood

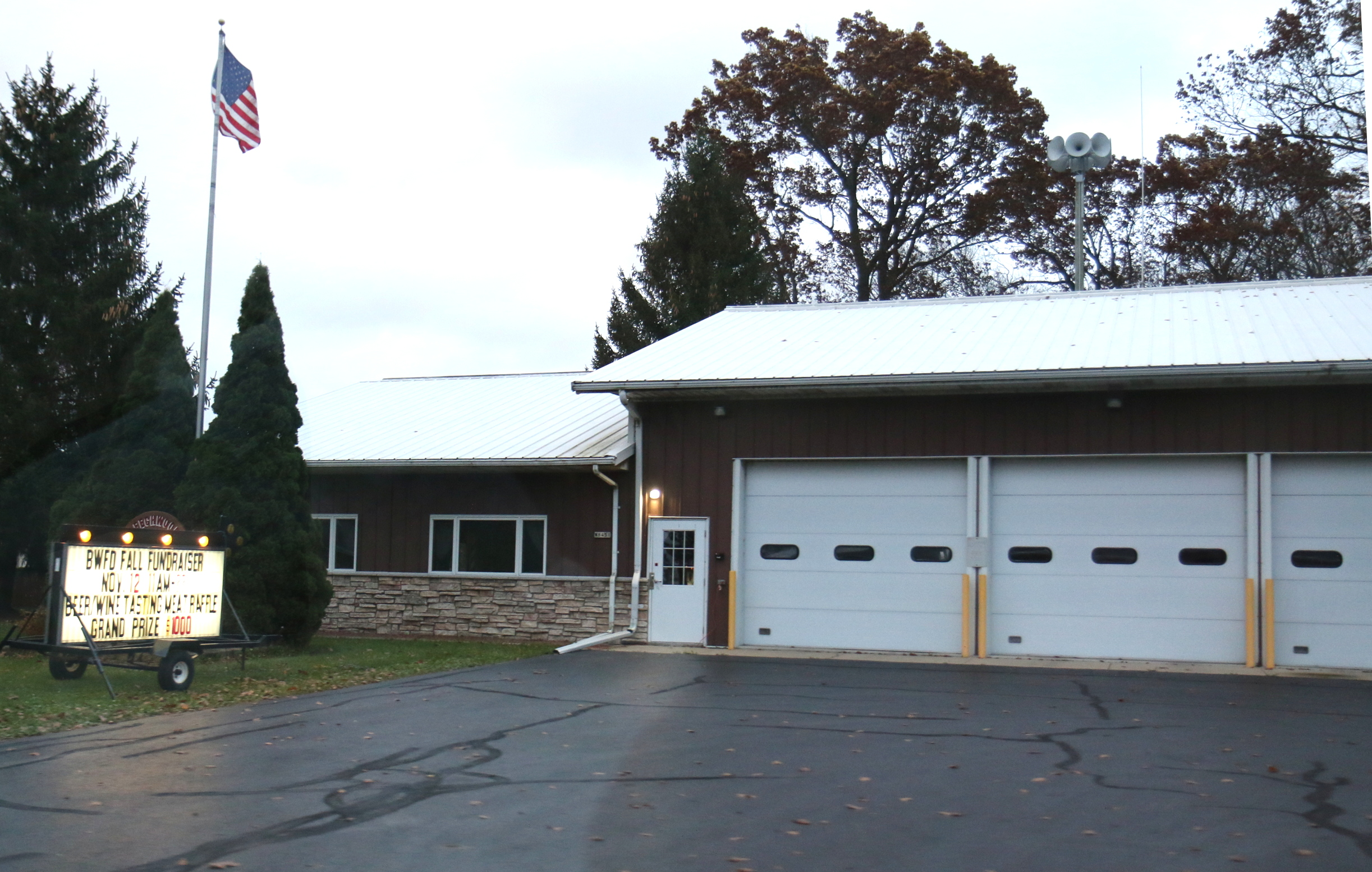
The fire department at Beechwood

== Notable people ==
- George W. Koch, Wisconsin State Representative, farmer, businessman, lived in Beechwood where he owned a cheese and butter factory.
