= Richert Vogt von Koch =

Swedish military officer (1838–1913)

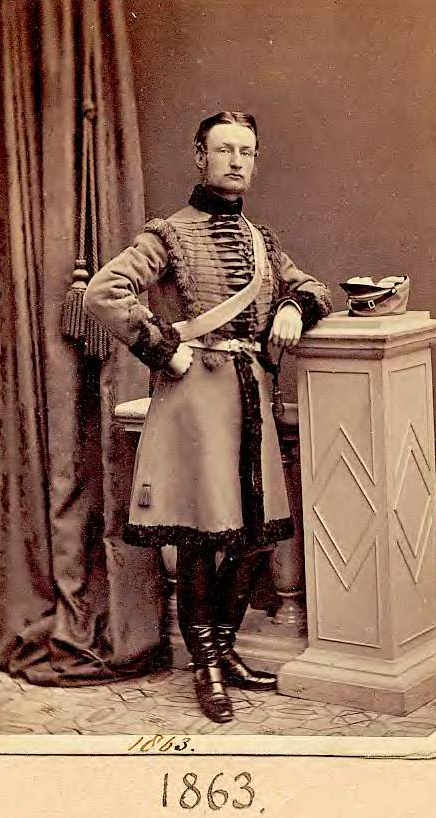
Richert Vogt von Koch

Richert Vogt von Koch (December 22, 1838 - November 28, 1913) was a Swedish military officer and writer. He was the son of the Swedish justice chancellor Nils Samuel von Koch. In his military career, von Koch became a second lieutenant in the Mounted Life Guards in 1857 and was promoted to lieutenant colonel in 1887. He retired from military service in 1894. In 1873 von Koch was elected to the Royal Swedish Academy of War Sciences. He was also active as an author of several novels and various non-fiction works. His marriage with Agathe Wrede produced several distinguished children: the district judge Ragnar von Koch, the politician Gerhard Halfred von Koch, the mathematician Niels Fabian Helge von Koch, the artists Ebba von Koch and Frances Wachtmeister, the composer Sigurd von Koch, and the language teacher Arne von Koch.

== Bibliography ==
- A Summer Interlude at a Swedish Manor. Stockholm: Norstedt. 1869.
- General Conscription. Stockholm: Skoglund Brothers. 1876.
- On Girls' Upbringing. Stockholm: P. A. Norstedt & Sons. 1876.
- The Queen's Chambermaid. Stockholm: Norstedt. 1879.
- Education: An Exposition of Herbert Spencer. Stockholm: Norstedt. 1879.
- Koch, Richert von (1893). Camilla : A Novel of High Society. Stockholm: Norstedt. hdl:2077/57909.
- The Prime Minister: A Novel of High Society. Stockholm: Looström. 1894–1895.
- Will there be a War with Norway?. Stockholm: Bonnier. 1895.
- Basic Principles of Government, Finance, and Jurisprudence. Stockholm: Looström. 1895.
- Koch, Richert von (1898). Pandemonium: The Life of Artists and the Theatre in Stockholm. Stockholm: Samson & Wallin. hdl:2077/56209.
