= Nature Reviews Genetics =

Nature Reviews. Genetics
- Discipline: Genetics
- Language: English
- Edited by: Linda Koch

Publication details
- History: 2000–present
- Publisher: Nature Portfolio
- Frequency: Monthly
- Impact factor: 59.943 (2021)

Standard abbreviations
- ISO 4: Nat. Rev. Genet.

Indexing
- CODEN: NRGAAM
- ISSN: 1471-0056 (print); 1471-0064 (web)

Links
- Journal homepage; Online archive

Nature Reviews Genetics is a monthly review journal published by Nature Portfolio. It was established in 2000 and covers the full breadth of modern genetics. The editor-in-chief is Linda Koch. The journal publishes review and perspective articles written by experts in the field subject to peer review and copy editing to provide authoritative coverage of topics. Each issue also contains Research Highlight articles – short summaries written by the editors that describe recent research papers.

According to the Journal Citation Reports, the journal has a 2021 impact factor of 59.943, ranking it 1st out of 175 journals in the category "Genetics & Heredity".
