= KAIROS Prize =

The KAIROS Prize has been awarded to European artists and scholars from the fields of visual and performing arts, music, architecture, design, film, photography, literature and journalism since 2007 by the Alfred Toepfer Foundation in Hamburg. It is endowed with a sum of 75,000 Euro. The prize recognises and supports European artists, scientists and cultural mediators who have not yet reached the peak of their creativity, for their pioneering, avant-garde and groundbreaking work. It is named after the Greek god Kairos, the god of the right moment.

== Winners ==
- 2007: Albrecht Dümling, German musicologist
- 2008: Tímea Junghaus, Hungarian art historian
- 2009: Sidi Larbi Cherkaoui, Belgian choreographer
- 2010: Andri Snær Magnason, Icelandic writer
- 2011: Şermin Langhoff, Turkish-German theatre director
- 2012: Katell Gélébart, French fashion designer
- 2013: Paweł Althamer, Polish sculptor and video artist
- 2014: Jasmila Žbanić, Bosnian film director
- 2015: Eike Roswag, German architect
- 2016: Teodor Currentzis, Greek-Russian conductor and musician
- 2017: Inci Bürhaniye and Selma Wels
- 2018: Jan Gerchow
- 2019: Nihad Kreševljaković, Bosnian historian and director
- 2020: Agnes Meyer-Brandis
- 2023: Alona Karavai
- 2024: Salomé Jashi
- 2025: Holly Herndon and Mat Dryhurst
- 2026: Martin MacInnes

== See also ==
- List of European art awards
