= Claus Koch =

German sports shooter

Personal information
- Born: 27 April 1953 (age 73) Kempten, Germany

Sport
- Sport: Sports shooting

Claus Koch (born 27 April 1953) is a German former sports shooter. He competed at the 1976 Summer Olympics for West Germany.
