= Wolfgang Koch (computer scientist) =

German physicist and computer scientist

Johann Koch
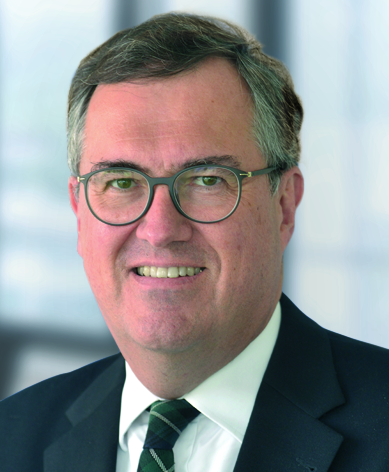
- Wolfgang Koch (November 2017)
- Born: Johann Wolfgang Koch; October 18, 1962 (age 63); Nuremberg, Germany
- Education: RWTH Aachen University
- Occupations: Physicist; Computer scientist

Johann Wolfgang Koch (born 18 October 1962) is a German physicist and computer scientist. He teaches applied computer science at the University of Bonn, Germany, and is chief scientist of the Fraunhofer Institute for Communication, Information Processing and Ergonomics. In 2011, Koch was elected a IEEE Fellow and since 2015, he has been an IEEE Distinguished Lecturer.

== Life and education ==
Koch was born and brought up in Nuremberg, Bavaria, the eldest of three sons of the lawyer, insurance scientist, and manager Peter Koch and his wife Luise, née Köllner. He passed his Abitur at the Charlemagne Gymnasium in Aachen. At RWTH Aachen University, he studied physics and mathematics, graduating in physics (diploma in 1987). He received his doctorate (Dr. rer. nat.) in 1990 at the Institute for Theoretical Particle Physics and Cosmology of the RWTH Aachen with a dissertation in the field of ergodic theory of dynamical systems under the supervision of Gert Roepstorff.

From 2002 to 2010, Koch taught as a lecturer at the chair of Armin B. Cremers on a part-time basis and habilitated in the field of applied computer science at the University of Bonn. At the University of Bonn Institute of Computer Science he has been teaching as an Apl. Professor since 2018, focusing on signal processing, sensor data fusion, artificial intelligence, resource management. He is also involved in Carl Cranz Society for Technical and Scientific Education.

== Scientific focus ==
For many years, Koch has headed the research department Sensor Data and Information Fusion (SDF) at the Fraunhofer Institute for Communication, Information Processing and Ergonomics, a research institute of the Fraunhofer Society, the largest organization for applied research and development in Europe.

He and his team work predominantly for the German Federal Ministry of Defences with security tasks, including homeland security, and corresponding industrial companies. The work covers digitization in this environment, such as Intelligence, Surveillance, and Reconnaissance (ISR), electronic & navigation warfare, sensor and platform resource management, mobile and distributed multisensor systems, and aspects of Manned-unManned Teaming (MuM-T). He is also the single point of contact of the Fraunhofer Segment for Defense and Security (VVS) to the European Future Combat Air System (FCAS). He also represents scientific interests of the German Navy within the framework of the European Defence Fund.

He is one of the initiators and co-chair of the Working Group on Responsible Use of New Technologies in a Future Combat Air System (FCAS).

Koch is a member of the Board of Directors of the International Society of Information Fusion (ISIF) and supports program committees for ISIF's FUSION conference series, and was Executive Chairman of FUSION 2008 in Cologne.

Koch is involved in the IEEE Aerospace and Electronics Systems Society (AESS) within the globally operating Institute of Electrical and Electronics Engineers (IEEE) as an IEEE Fellow, IEEE Distinguished Lecturer, and Member of the Board of Governors. In 2014, he founded the Germany Section of the IEEE AESS and has been Chapter Chair.

In 2005, Koch founded the annual Sensor Data Fusion – Trends, Solutions, Applications (SDF) event series[9] as a meeting of the fusion community of Germany and neighboring countries, which he also chairs and which has been held annually since 2011 as a peer-reviewed IEEE symposium at the Universitätsclub Bonn and has been a component of the content-related international ISIF-FUSION and IEEE-MFI conferences on several occasions.

In November 2016, Koch was part of the German-Canadian research team for the Protection and Advanced Surveillance System for the Arctic: Green, Efficient, Secure (PASSAGES) project. The project was a co-initiated by the Fraunhofer Institute of Communication, Information Processing and Ergonomics (FKIE) and its goal was to collect data sources found in the Northwest Passage’s climate zones with the help of passive radar technology.

== Selected publications ==
- Tracking and Sensor Data Fusion. Methodological Framework and Selected Applications. Zugl. Habilitation. Springer Nature, Berlin/Heidelberg 2014, ISBN 978-3-642-39270-2.
- Accumulated State Densities and Their Applications in Object Tracking. Chapter 18 in: H. Fourati (Ed.). Multisensor Data Fusion: From Algorithm and Architecture Design to Applications. CRC Press 2016, ISBN 978-0-367-65628-7.
- The Role of Context in Multiple Sensor Systems for Civil Security. Chapter 20 in: L. Snidaro et al. (Eds.). Context Enhanced Information Fusion. Springer Nature, Berlin/Heidelberg 2016, ISBN 978-3-319-28971-7
- as Ed. with Richard Klemm, Hugh Griffiths: Novel Radar Techniques and Applications. Part II: Target Tracking and Data Fusion. SciTech Publishing, 2017, ISBN 978-1-61353-226-3
- Zur Ethik der wehrtechnischen Digitalisierung. Informations- und ingenieurwissenschaftliche Aspekte [Ethical Issues in Defense Digitalization. Computer Science and Engineering Espects]. Chapter 1 in: M. Rogg et al. (Eds.). Ethische Herausforderungen digitalen Wandels in bewaffneten Konflikten [Ethical Challenges of Digital Transformation in Armed Conflict.]. German Institute for Defence and Strategic Studies (GIDS), Hamburg 2020, ISBN 978-3-948752-00-2 (E-Book)
- mit Dorothea Koch (2018), Konrad Adenauer. Der Katholik und sein Europa [Konrad Adenauer. The Catholic and His Europe] (in German) (3 ed.), Kißlegg: fe-Medienverlag, ISBN 978-3-86357-129-0
- Marianisches bei Goethe. fe-Medienverlag, Kißlegg 2021, ISBN 978-3-86357-298-3
