= Ina Koch =

German bioinformatician (born 1958)

Ina Koch (born 1958) is a German bioinformatics researcher who holds the Chair of Molecular Bioinformatics at Goethe University Frankfurt, in the faculty of mathematics and computer science. She has published research on the use of maximum common subgraphs and Petri nets to model problems in biology, and on the prediction of deleterious alleles.

== Education and career ==
Koch was born in 1958 in East Berlin, and studied quantum chemistry at Leipzig University, working there with Cornelius Weiss. She became a researcher in the Institute for Cybernetics and Information Processing of the German Academy of Sciences at Berlin, and after the German reunification in 1990, became a researcher for the GMD-Forschungszentrum Informationstechnik from 1992 to 1996, and completed a doctorate in theoretical computer science.

After postdoctoral research with Jens Reich at the Max Delbrück Center for Molecular Medicine in the Helmholtz Association, and with Martin Vingron at the Max Planck Institute for Molecular Genetics, she took a professorship in 2002 at the Berlin University of Applied Sciences and Technology. She moved in 2005 to the University of Jena, and again in 2010 to her present position in Frankfurt.
