= Gerald Koch =

German wood scientist and professor

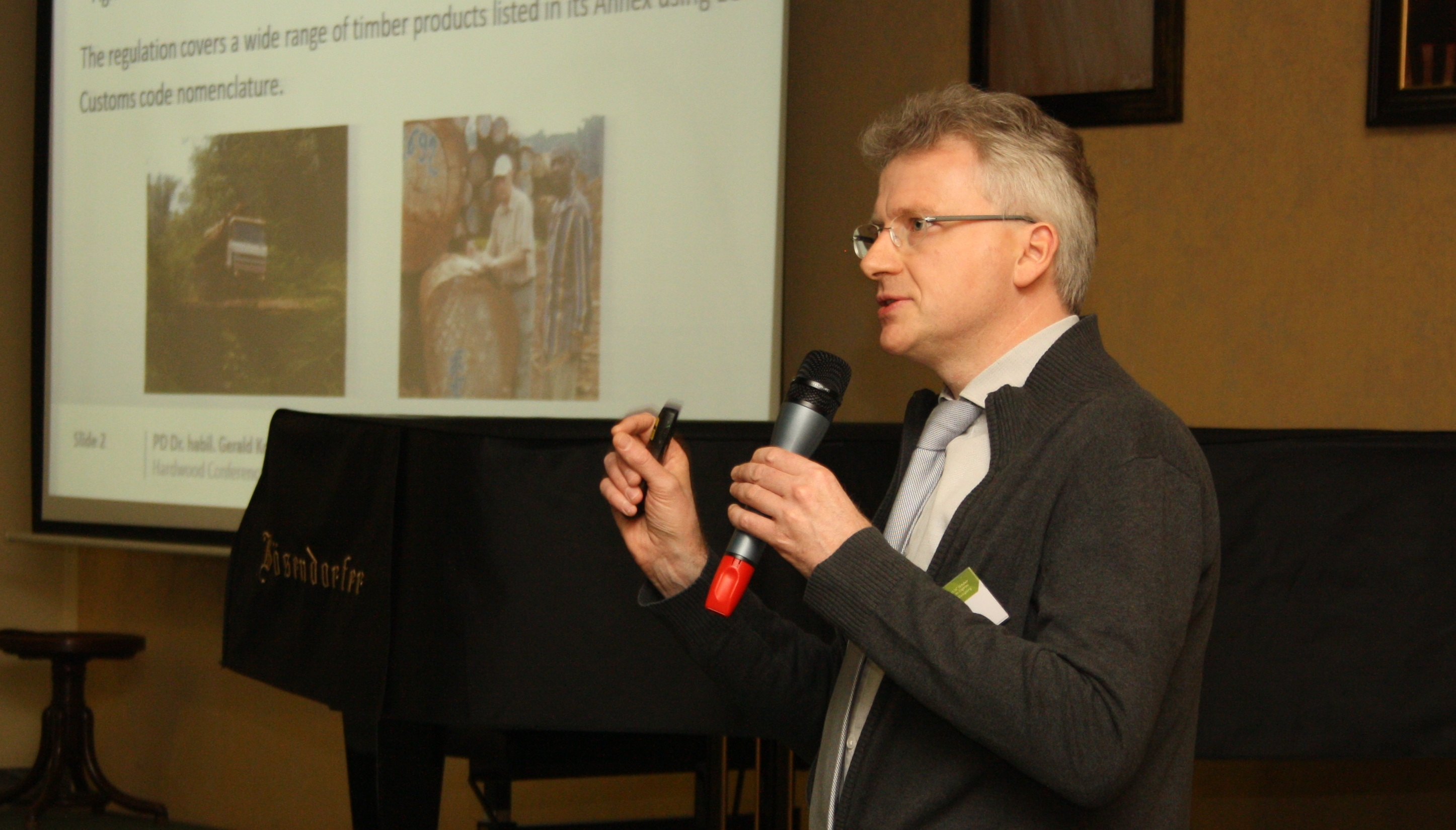
- Born: 1968 (age 57–58)
- Education: University of Hamburg
- Occupations: Researcher; educator; wood scientist; curator
- Years active: Since 1996

Gerald Koch (born in 1968) is a German wood scientist and professor, senior researcher of wood anatomy, and research scientific director at the Thünen-Institute of Wood Research at Hamburg, who is an elected fellow of the International Academy of Wood Science.

== Research career ==
Koch obtained his PhD degree in wood science from the University of Hamburg in 1998.

Since 2004, he is the curator of the scientific wood collection, and also the head of wood anatomy at the Institute of Wood Research in Hamburg.

His research interests include topics of wood sciences related to macroscopic and microscopic wood identification of internationally traded timbers, forensic timber identification, investigation of wood structure, properties and utilisation of lesser known species, and also, topochemical analyses of wooden tissues on a subcellular level.

In the area of wood anatomy, he has been the initiator of the mobile apps, CITESwoodID and macroHOLZdata, which are commonly used by educational personnel, and professionals in wood industry and trade for the identification of tropical and non-tropical timbers.

== Recognition ==
In 2008, he was elected as a fellow at the International Academy of Wood Science for his scientific work.

He is a member of the International Association of Wood Anatomists. In addition, Koch is an appointed advisor of the German Federal Ministry for the Environment, Nature Conservation, Nuclear Safety and Consumer Protection (BMUV), specifically on matters of subtropical and tropical timbers including certification and CITES regulations.

Koch presently serves as a member in the editorial boards of estemeed wood-related journals Holzforschung and European Journal of Wood and Wood Products.

Until November 2026, Koch has published and presented more than 200 research works in several referred journals, conferences and symposia, and possesses more than 5,300 citations at Google Scholar.
