= F. H. B. Koch =

Ceylonese (Sri Lankan) judge and lawyer

The Honourable Justice F. H. B. Koch KC

Member of the Legislative Council of Ceylon
- In office 1924–1931

Puisne Justice of the Supreme Court of Ceylon

Personal details
- Born: Francis Harold Bertram Koch; 8 August 1879

Justice Francis Harold Bertram Koch, KC (8 August 1879 – ) was a Ceylonese (Sri Lankan) judge and lawyer. He was a Judge of the Supreme Court of Ceylon and member of the Legislative Council of Ceylon.

During his legal career, he served as District Judge of Colombo and acting Solicitor General of Ceylon (1930–1931). He was appointed King's Counsel in 1932.

From 1924 to 1931, he was a member of the Legislative Council of Ceylon. In 1935, he was appointed a Puisne Justice of the Supreme Court of Ceylon.

He was the elder brother of Rosslyn Koch.
