= Ingedore Grünfeld Villaça Koch =

Brazilian linguist (1933–2018)

- Born: 22 September 1933; Eisenach, Germany
- Died: 15 May 2018 (aged 84); São Paulo, Brazil

Academic work
- Discipline: linguistics
- Institutions: University of Campinas; National Council for Scientific and Technological Development
- Main interests: text linguistics

Ingedore Grünfeld Villaça Koch (22 September 1933 — 15 May 2018) was a Brazilian linguist known for her work on text linguistics. She was a professor at the University of Campinas for almost three decades and an emerita researcher of the Brazilian National Council for Scientific and Technological Development. Koch is considered "one of the most respected figures of Brazilian linguistics" and her works are viewed as fundamental to the development of text linguistics in Brazil. She was one of the founders of the Latin American Association of Discourse Studies.

== Selected bibliography ==
- Argumentação e linguagem. São Paulo: Cortez, 1984.
- A coerência textual. São Paulo: Contexto, 1989. (with Luiz Carlos Travaglia)
- A coesão textual. São Paulo: Contexto, 1989.
- O texto e a construção dos sentidos. São Paulo: Contexto, 1997.
- Desvendando os segredos do texto. São Paulo: Cortez, 2002.
- Introdução à linguística textual. São Paulo: Martins Fontes, 2004.
- Ler e compreender: os sentidos do texto. São Paulo: Contexto, 2006. (with Vanda Maria Elias)
- Intertextualidade: diálogos possíveis. São Paulo: Cortez, 2007. (with Anna Christina Bentes and Mônica Magalhães Cavalcante)

=== Editor ===
- Gramática do português culto falado no Brasil: a construção do texto falado. Campinas: Unicamp, 2006. (with Clélia Cândida Abreu Spinardi Jubran)

=== Homages ===
- Souza, Edson Rosa Francisco de; Penhavel, Eduardo; Cintra, Marcos Rogério (eds.). Linguística Textual: interfaces e delimitações. Homenagem a Ingedore Grünfeld Villaça Koch. São Paulo: Cortez, 2017.
