= Susanna Koch =

Austrian footballer (born 1987)

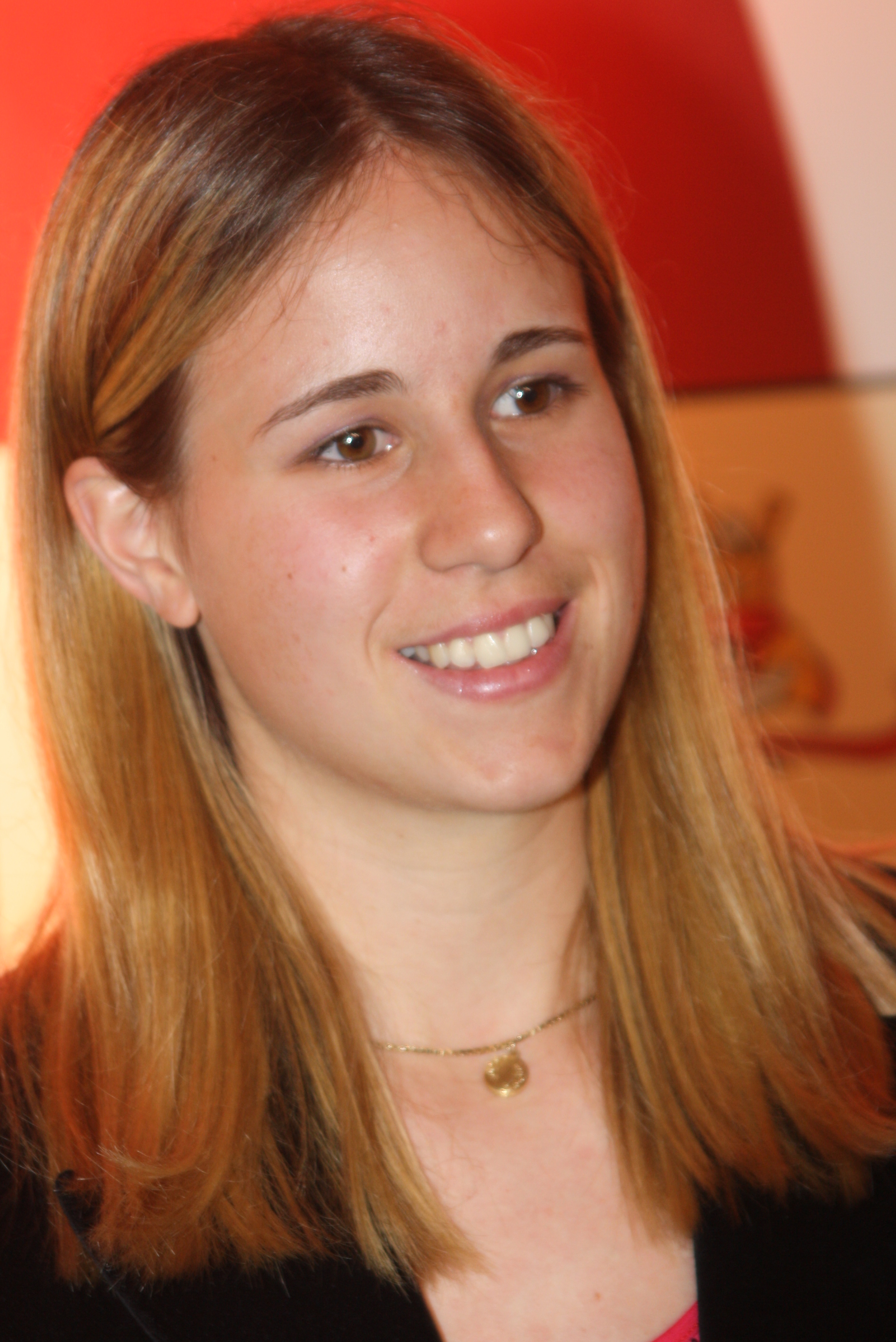

Personal information
- Date of birth: 14 July 1987 (age 39)
- Place of birth: Oberwart, Austria
- Position: Forward

Team information
- Current team: FC Südburgenland

Susanna Koch (born 14 July 1987) is an Austrian footballer who plays as a striker for FC Südburgenland.
