= Linda Koch =

German-French geneticist

Linda Koch is a German-French geneticist, and the chief editor of academic journal Nature Reviews Genetics.

She is a specialist in mouse genetics.

== Education ==
Koch has a PhD in genetics from the University of Cologne.

== Career ==
She undertook postdoctoral research investigating a knockout mouse model of the fat mass and obesity-associated protein.

In 2009, she joined Nature Reviews Endocrinology initially as an associate editor, then as a senior editor, before becoming the locum chief editor. She was appointed as chief editor of Nature Reviews Genetics in 2014.

=== Selected publications ===
- Fischer, Julia; Koch, Linda; Emmerling, Christian; Vierkotten, Jeanette; Peters, Thomas; Brüning, Jens C.; Rüther, Ulrich (2009). "Inactivation of the Fto gene protects from obesity". Nature. 458 (7240): 894–898. Bibcode:2009Natur.458..894F. doi:10.1038/nature07848. ISSN 1476-4687. PMID 19234441. S2CID 391105.
- Hess, Martin E.; Hess, Simon; Meyer, Kate D.; Verhagen, Linda A. W.; Koch, Linda; Brönneke, Hella S.; Dietrich, Marcelo O.; Jordan, Sabine D.; Saletore, Yogesh; Elemento, Olivier; Belgardt, Bengt F. (2013). "The fat mass and obesity associated gene (Fto) regulates activity of the dopaminergic midbrain circuitry". Nature Neuroscience. 16 (8): 1042–1048. doi:10.1038/nn.3449. ISSN 1546-1726. PMID 23817550. S2CID 11452560.

== Personal life ==
She lives in Ramsgate, England.
