= Jan Koch =

German footballer

Personal information
- Date of birth: 4 November 1995 (age 31)
- Place of birth: Wörth an der Donau, Germany
- Height: 1.84 m (6 ft 0 in)
- Position: Centre back

Youth career
- 1999–2005: Geisling
- 2005–2009: Jahn Regensburg
- 2009–2010: 1. FC Nürnberg
- 2010–2011: Jahn Regensburg
- 2011–2014: Greuther Fürth

Senior career*
Years	Team	Apps	(Gls)
2014–2015	SpVgg Unterhaching	14	(0)
2015–2016	Mladá Boleslav	6	(0)
2016–2018	Chemnitzer FC	25	(0)
2018–2019	Berliner AK	34	(0)
2019–2022	Energie Cottbus	46	(2)
2022–2023	SGV Freiberg	21	(0)
2023–2024	Chemnitzer FC	19	(0)
- * Club domestic league appearances and goals as of 21 September 2024

Jan Koch (born 4 November 1995) is a German footballer who plays as a centre back.
