= Roger Koch =

American politician

Member-elect of the Missouri House of Representatives from the 162nd district
- Assuming office January 2027
- Succeeding: Bob Bromley

Personal details
- Party: Republican

Roger Koch is an American politician. A member of the Republican Party, he is the member-elect for the 162nd district of the Missouri House of Representatives.
