= Johann Heinrich Koch (Hessian mercenary) =

Hessian soldier in Revolutionary War (1748-1801)

- Soldiers of von Bose's regiment circa. 1783, the same year that Koch deserted
- Born: 1748; Calden, Kassel, Landgraviate of Hesse-Kassel
- Died: 1801 (aged 52–53); Abbeville County, South Carolina, United States
- Spouse: Margaret Lightfoot (1764-1847)
- Children: 6, including Philip Henry Cook
- Military career
- Allegiance: Hesse-Kassel; British Empire; United States
- Branch: British Army Mercenary Force; South Carolina Militia
- Service years: 1775-1783
- Rank: Private (Hessian Grenadier); Private (South Carolina Militia)
- Units: 2nd Company, von Bose's Regiment, Hesse-Kassel Mercenaries; 3rd Battalion, Linsing Grenadier Battalion, Hesse Kassel Mercenaries
- Conflicts: American Revolutionary War; Northern Theater; Battle of Long Island; Battle of White Plains; Battle of Fort Mercer; Battle of Brandywine; Battle of Germantown; Battle of Monmouth; Southern Theater; Capture of Savannah; Siege of Charleston; Battle of Camden; Battle of Guildford Court House (WIA); Deserted in South Carolina 1783

Johann Heinrich Koch later John Henry Cook, was a German-American, mercenary and farmer, who served as a Hessian auxiliary during the American Revolutionary War. He deserted in 1783 and joined the South Carolina Militia. His desertion was common for many soldiers who decided to stay in the new country, rather than make the voyage back to Europe.

== Early life ==
Johann Heinrich Koch, was born in 1762, to Johann Koch (1704–1767) and Anna Homburg (1704-1768). He was impressed into military service and sent to fight the American Revolutionary War as a mercenary.

== Military Service ==
Was present for major notable battles of the American Revolutionary War such as the Battle of Brandywine, the Battle of Camden, and the Battle of Guildford Court House. He was with General Cornwallis at Wilmington, North Carolina, and eventually deserted while stationed in South Carolina in 1783. After desertion, he joined the local South Carolina Militia for the remainder of the war. After the war he moved into the interior of the state.

== Later life ==
He anglicized his named to John Henry Cook and married Margaret Lightfoot. He moved to Abbeville County, South Carolina and became a farmer, planting Cherry trees on his property that are still some of the last evidence of him on his property today. He died around 1801, the rest of his family, except his eldest child Philip, moved further west into states like Alabama and Mississippi, looking for better soil for farming.
