= Herbert Koch =

German mathematician

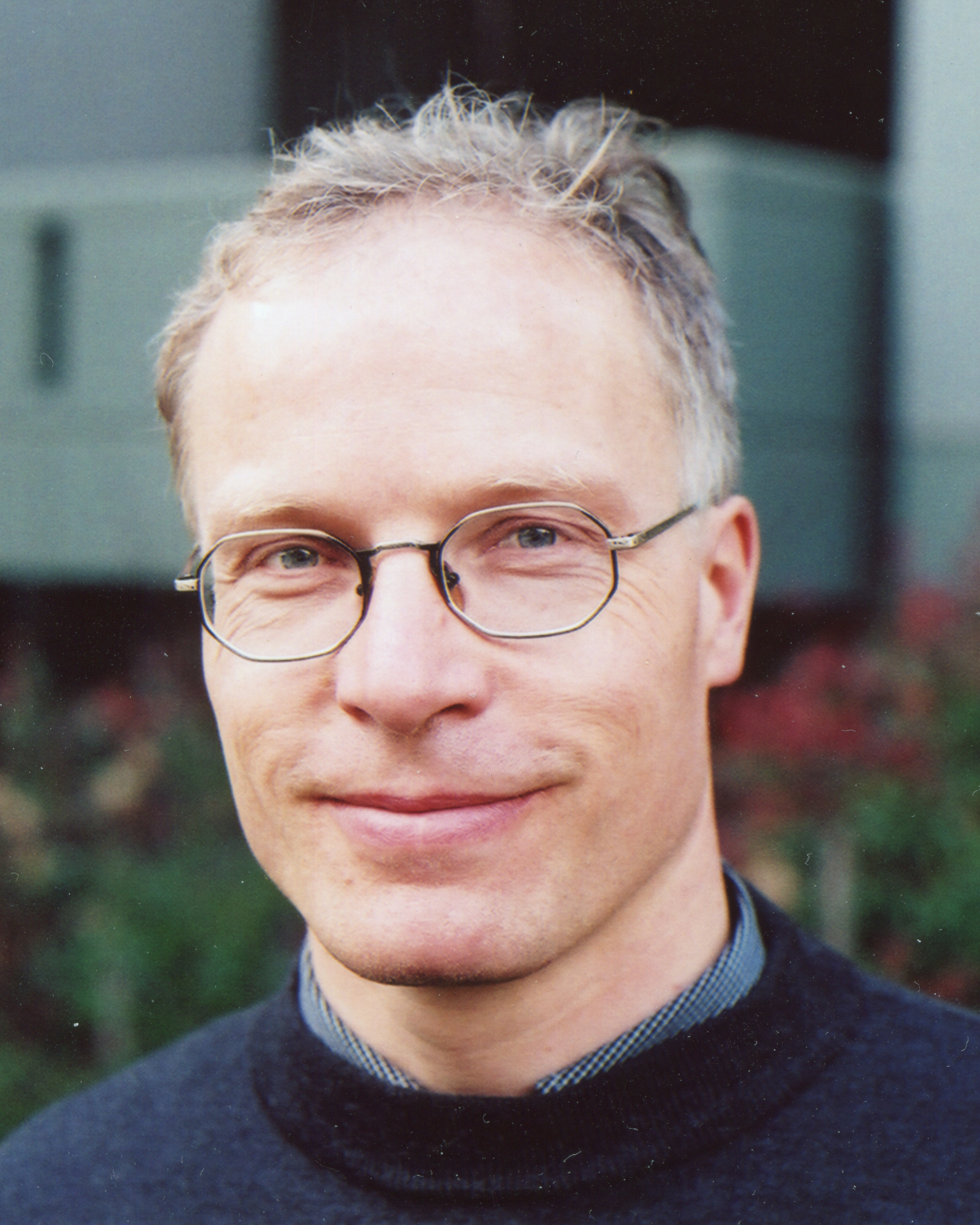
Herbert Koch

Herbert Koch (born 14 September 1962) is a German mathematician active in the field of partial differential equations. He occupies the position of a professor at the University of Bonn.

Together with Daniel Tataru, he is known for his work on the well-posedness of the Navier–Stokes equations, one of their results being known as Koch–Tataru solution.

He is co-editor of Mathematische Annalen and Analysis & PDE.
