= George W. Koch =

American politician

George W. Koch (September 11, 1871 – April 21, 1908) was an American farmer, businessman, and politician.

Born in Mayfield, Washington County, Wisconsin, Koch went to the public schools and Janssen's Institute in Milwaukee, Wisconsin. He moved to Beechwood, in 1895, in the town of Scott, Sheboygan County, Wisconsin and manufactured cheese and butter until 1902. He then went into the general merchandising business and farming. Koch served as chairman of the Scott Town Board, in 1898, and as justice of the peace. He also served on the school board and was the clerk. In 1903, Koch served in the Wisconsin State Assembly and was a Republican. Koch was served on the Sheboygan County Board of Supervisors and was chairman of the county board. On April 21, 1908, Koch died suddenly of a stroke while sitting on a Wisconsin Circuit Court jury, at the Sheboygan County Court House, in Sheboygan, Wisconsin. His death remained unnoticed by the other jury members sitting next to him for several minutes.
