= Magdalena Koch =

Polish academic

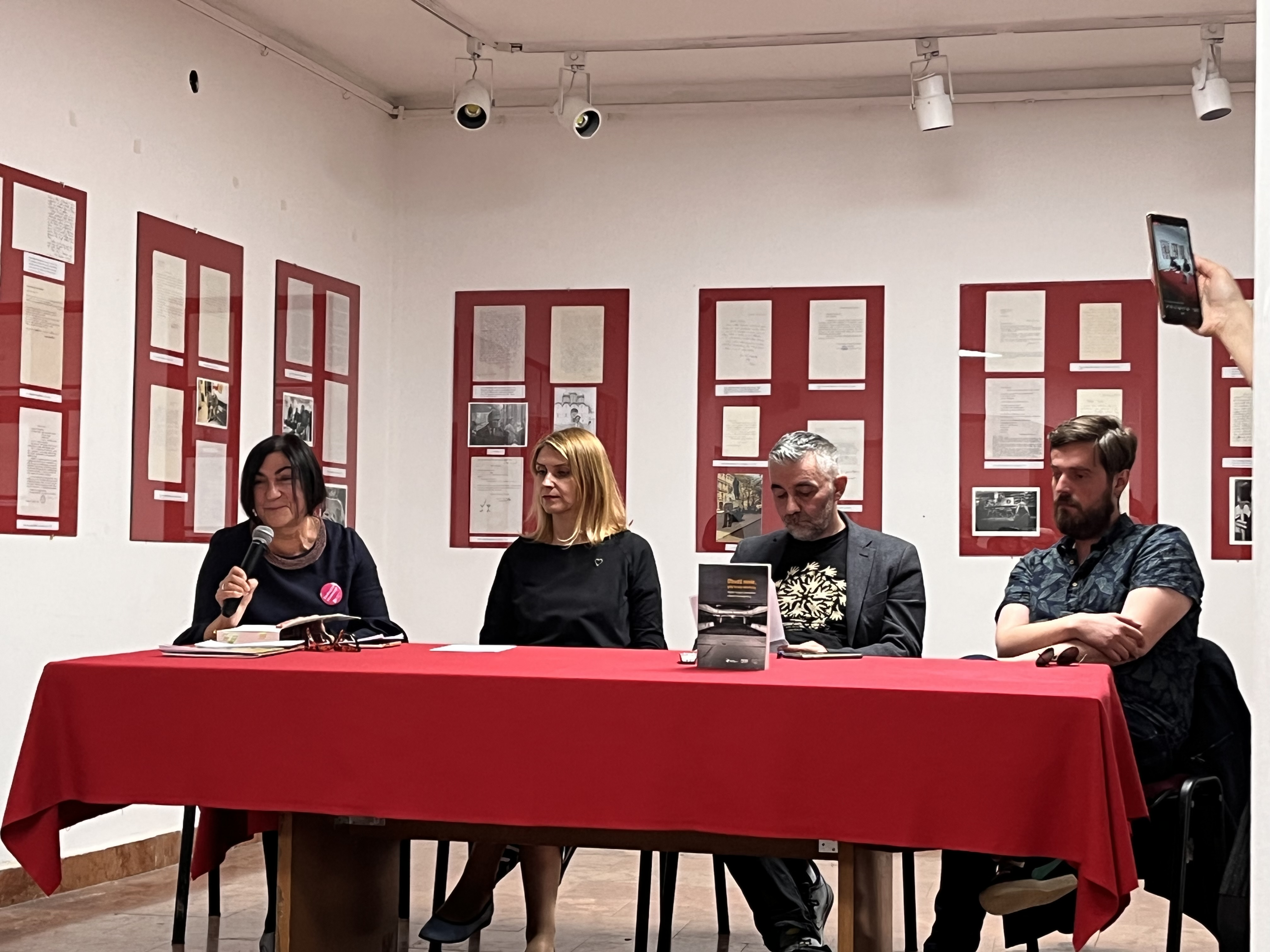
Magdalena Koch, Dominika Kaniecka, Nihad Kreševljaković, Adnan Lugonić

Magdalena Jolanta Koch (born 1958) is a Polish academic, a specialist in Serbian and Croatian literature of the 20th and 21st centuries, she has specialized in Gender studies, identity, transculturalism of the Balkans as well as modern Serbian and Croatian drama.

She graduated in Slavic studies (Russian and Serbocroatian language) at University of Wrocław in 1981, where she taught until 2011. She gained her PhD (1997) with a work Podróże w czasie i przestrzeni. Proza Isidory Sekulić. Since October 2011 she is a professor at Adam Mickiewicz University in Poznan.

== Publications ==
- Podróże w czasie i przestrzeni. Proza Isidory Sekulić, Wydawnictwo Uniwersytetu Wrocławskiego, Wrocław 2000
- …kiedy dojrzejemy jako kultura…Twórczość pisarek serbskich na początku XX wieku (kanon – genre – gender), Wydawnictwo Uniwersytetu Wrocławskiego, Wrocław 2007
- ...kada sazremo kao kultura... Stvaralaštvo srpskih spisateljica na početku XX veka (kanon – žanr – rod), Službeni glasnik, Beograd 2012
- Milena Pavlović Barilli EX POST, kritike, članci, bibliografija, HESPERIAedu, Beograd 2009 (co-authorship - Lidija Merenik i Aleksandar Popović, M. Koch, A Quest for Milena Pavlović Barilli in Serbian Literature/Sulle tracce di Milena Pavlović Barilli nella letteratura serba/U potrazi za Milenom Pavlović Barili u srpskoj književnosti
