= Barbara Koch =

Professor

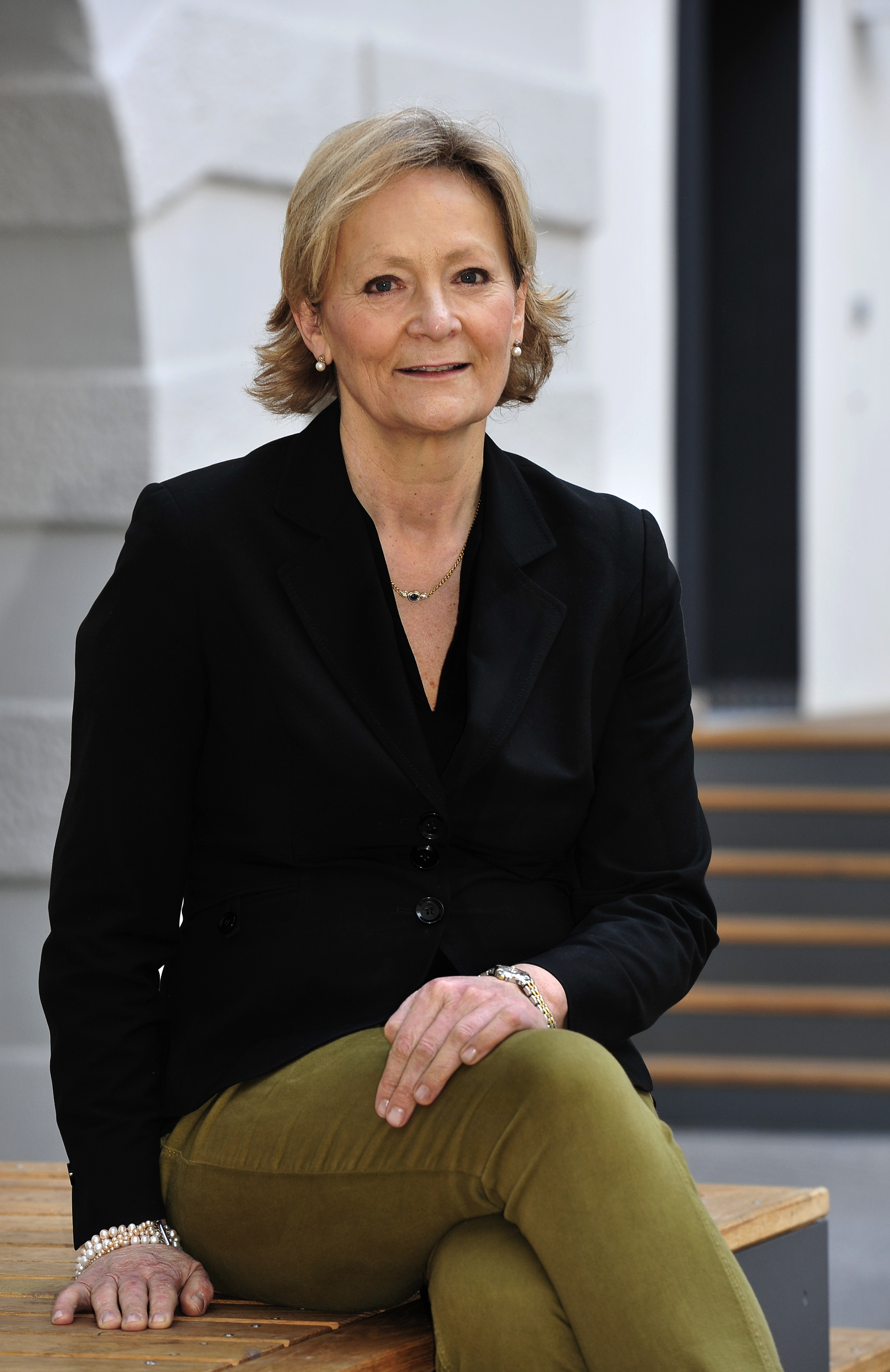

Academic background
- Education: Diploma in Forestry at LMU Munich, 1982 Ph.D., LMU Munich, 1988 Habilitation, University of Freiburg. 1994

Academic work
- Discipline: Forest and Environmental Sciences
- Sub-discipline: Geoinformatics, Remote Sensing
- Institutions: University of Freiburg

Barbara Koch is a Professor of Remote Sensing and Landscape Information Systems at the University of Freiburg, Germany. When she took this position, Koch became the youngest and first female professor at the Faculty of Forest Sciences at the University of Freiburg.

Koch is an emerging leader in the field of applied Innovation Technology for transformation towards renewable energy and circularity for better environmental protection. She is the Director of the Center of Renewable Energy and the Director of the Upper Rhine Cluster of Sustainability Research. From 2005, she is the Head of the Steinbeis Research Center "FeLis" (GmbH).

== Education ==
Koch studied Forest Sciences at LMU Munich, Germany from 1976 to 1982. She carried out her dissertation in a collaborative research project between the German Space Organization DLR Oberpfaffenhofen, the Jet Propulsion Laboratories in Pasadena and LMU Munich in 1988.

== Career ==
Koch started her research career in remote sensing and geodata modelling for various forest and land use applications. Over the years, her research broadened to applied aspects of modelling for biodiversity, biomass, environmental impact, natural risk and renewable energy resource studies. From 1988 to 1994 she established the working group of Remote Sensing and GIS at the Institute of Landscape Planning and Nature Conservation at the Technical University of Munich. In 1994, she was appointed as full professor of Remote Sensing and Landscape Information Systems at the University of Freiburg. Since 1994, Koch has been involved in not only teaching and research in the field of Geoinformatics, Forest Sciences and Environmental Sciences, but also in the management and team building tasks, strategic research and human resource development and contribution to the faculty management tasks. She was the founding Dean of the Faculty of Environment and Natural Resources, first female Dean of the Faculty of environment and Natural Resources, first female Professor of the Faculty of Forest Sciences at the University of Freiburg. Koch held the position of President of Confederation of European Foresters (CEF) from 2016 to 2018, overlooking the governance and representation of association interests (60,000 members).

Koch has been a member of the advisory board of the National Park Black Forest since 2014. She is also the Director of the Centre of Renewable Energy (ZEE) since 2015. Furthermore, Koch is a member of the Editorial Board "Journal of Forest Planning", and "Silva Fennica". She was a member of the editorial board of "Photogrammetry, Remote Sensing and Geoinformation Systems" (until 2008). She is currently Member of the Commission on Air Quality in the VDI and DIN - Standards Committee KRdL.

== Research ==
Koch belongs to the "cutting edge" group of first international scientists who identified the potential of laser data for vegetation mapping and has carried out a number of scientific investigations and applications in this field in recent years. Her research is inter-and transdisciplinary as well as international oriented. She is leading the first transdisciplinary living lab research project at the University of Freiburg. Today she integrates her research in inter- and transdisciplinary research projects on sustainable development, like natural resource management, renewable energy transition, biodiversity or natural risk assessment. She strongly supports the development of a "Centre of "Sustainability and Transformation" at the University of Freiburg. After the closure of the fessenheim nuclear power plant in 2020, the regional and municipal political bodies defined the objectives for the development of the region. As lead of URCforSR and in collaboration with EUCOR – The European Campus, Barbara Koch initiated a feasibility study for a sustainable development of the site towards an innovation region with concrete investment options by the end of 2021.

== Awards ==
2016 Instructural Development Award, teaching award for the development of science trails to support teaching in large classes by real world examples

2012 Innovation prize by the State of Baden-Württemberg for the innovation prize "Übermorgenmacher"

1993 Bruno H. Schubert Prize for best young researchers in environmental sciences
