= Bubbles Koch =

South African rugby union player

- Full name: Henri Vercueil Koch
- Born: 13 June 1921 Hopefield, South Africa
- Died: 2 November 2003 (aged 82)
- Height: 1.88 m (6 ft 2 in)
- Weight: 102 kg (225 lb)

Rugby union career
- Position: Lock
Provincial / State sides
Years	Team	Apps	(Points)
1942	Boland		
1944–49	Western Province		
1948	Rhodesia		
International career
Years	Team	Apps	(Points)
1949	South Africa	4	(0)

Henri Vercueil Koch (13 June 1921 – 2 November 2003) was a South African international rugby union player.

Koch was born on the "Koperfontein" farm outside Hopefield. His nickname of "Bubbles" originated from when he was a baby and would gurgle bubbles. He was educated at Hoërskool Hopefield.

After playing senior rugby for his hometown club at age 15, Koch was developed from a backline player into a forward during his time with Stellenbosch University. He started his provincial career with Boland, but spent most of the 1940s with Western Province, and also had a season in Rhodesia when employed on a tobacco farm. In 1949, Koch was capped for the Springboks in all four matches of their 4-0 series whitewash of the touring All Blacks, utilised mainly as a lock.

Koch served Boland as both a selector and team manager.

== See also ==
- List of South Africa national rugby union players
