= Johann August Hermann (John) Koch =

Johannes August Hermann (John) Koch (22 December 1850, in Orunia – 28 September 1934, in Berlin) was one of the most prolific modern scholars of medieval English literature, especially the works of Geoffrey Chaucer.

== Biography ==
Koch studied Romance and English Philology at the Prussian University of Königsberg. He interrupted his studies to serve in the Franco-Prussian War of 1870/71. After receiving his doctoral degree at Königsberg, he became a school teacher in the Königsberg region and traveled extensively in Britain, France, and Italy. He married Thomasine Pole in 1878 and then moved to Berlin, where he taught at the Dorotheenstädtisches Realgymnasium until 1911. He died in Berlin in 1934.

== Achievements ==
Despite his responsibilities as a school teacher, Koch managed to produce a host of publications in the areas of Romance Philology, English Philology, comparative literature, and pedagogy. In the area of Chaucer Studies he became one of the most prolific scholars world-wide, reviewing between 1879 and 1934 more than 70 Chaucer studies and publishing more than 20 journal essays on questions of source and manuscript study. His critical editions of the Canterbury Tales and the so-called “Minor Poems” were widely known and appreciated. Together with Bernhard ten Brink, Eugen Kölbing, Julius Zupitza, and Ewald Flügel, he was part of the impressive cadre of German Chaucer scholars during the foundational phase of English Studies.

Koch was also greatly active as a member of the Corps Baltia, a student organization for which he wrote a number of essays and historical studies.

== Select studies ==
- (Ed.) Geoffrey Chaucer: The Pardoner's Prologue and Tale. A Critical Edition. Berlin: Felber; Heidelberg: Winter, 1902.
- (Ed.) A Detailed Comparison of the Eight Manuscripts of Chaucer's Canterbury Tales. London: Kegan Paul, Trench, Trübner & Co., 1913.
- (Ed.) Geoffrey Chaucer's Canterbury Tales: Nach dem Ellesmere Manuscript mit Lesarten, Anmerkungen, und einem Glossar. Heidelberg: Winter, 1915.
- "Chaucers Belesenheit in den römischen Klassikern." Englische Studien 57 (1923), 8-84.
- (Ed.) Geoffrey Chaucers Kleinere Dichtungen: nebst Einleitung, Lesarten, Anmerkungen und einem Wörterverzeichnis. Heidelberg: Winter, 1928.
