= Karen Koch (plant biologist) =

Plant biologist

Karen Koch is a plant biologist in the horticultural science department in the University of Florida. She is a professor in the Plant Molecular and Cellular Biology (PMCB) Program, Horticultural Sciences Department, and Genetics Institute at University of Florida.

== Research interest ==
Koch's lab is best known for its research on sugar-responsive gene expression and the capacity for this process to alter form and function of plants. Sugar availability provides pivotal cues for adjustment of genes affecting C and N allocation in plants. Of all the nutrients and hormones involved, sucrose remains the “life blood” of plants. This sugar occupies a truly central position in vascular transport, carbon partitioning within the plant, and as a source of sugar signals for responsive genes.

Her group thus focuses on genes that affect sucrose metabolism, its contribution to sugar signaling, and its partitioning to different end products. Particular attention is being directed toward maize kernel (fruit) development, cell-wall composition, and mechanisms of sugar transfer. Single-gene knockout mutants are being used to examine gene function.

Current projects are testing hypotheses for carbon-partitioning and gene expression in developing maize ovaries from floral differentiation to kernel harvest, and for involvement of key genes in cell wall biosynthesis at strategic stages of development (e.g. root-hair and pollen-tube elongation, early phases of kernel differentiation, and growth of seedlings).

== Awards and honors ==
Koch is the 2016 recipient of the Charles Reid Barnes Award, the American Society of Plant Biologists (ASPB)’s oldest award. According to ASPB 'Karen has excelled in research, in the training of students of plant biology, and in service to the Society. Her research on carbohydrate metabolism and sugar signaling is known internationally and her training of plant biology students is legendary.'

Her work on carbon metabolism and the effects of sugars on gene expression was one of five 2012 fellows inducted by the ASPB organization. Koch’s “feast and famine” framework for regulating the expression of genes forms the basis for understanding the responses of plant organs to sugar signaling to optimize resource allocation. She served the group as an elected member of its Executive Committee and is the first Fellow of ASPB recipient from Florida. She was on the Plant Physiology editorial board from 1987 to 1993.
