= Hermann Koch (painter) =

German painter (1856–1939)

Hermann Koch (22 November 1856 – 19 July 1939) was a German painter.

== Life and work ==
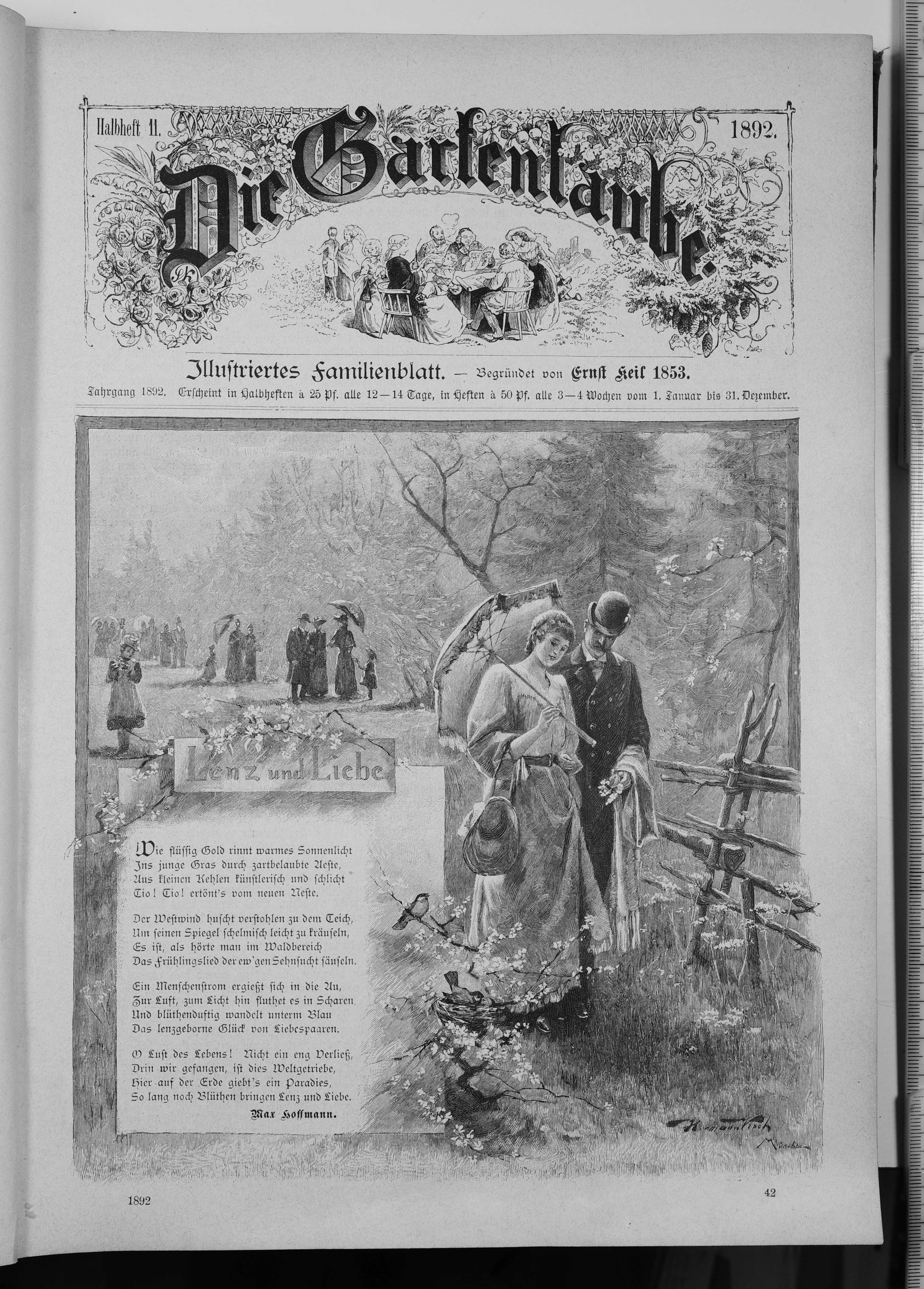
Die Gartenlaube 1892

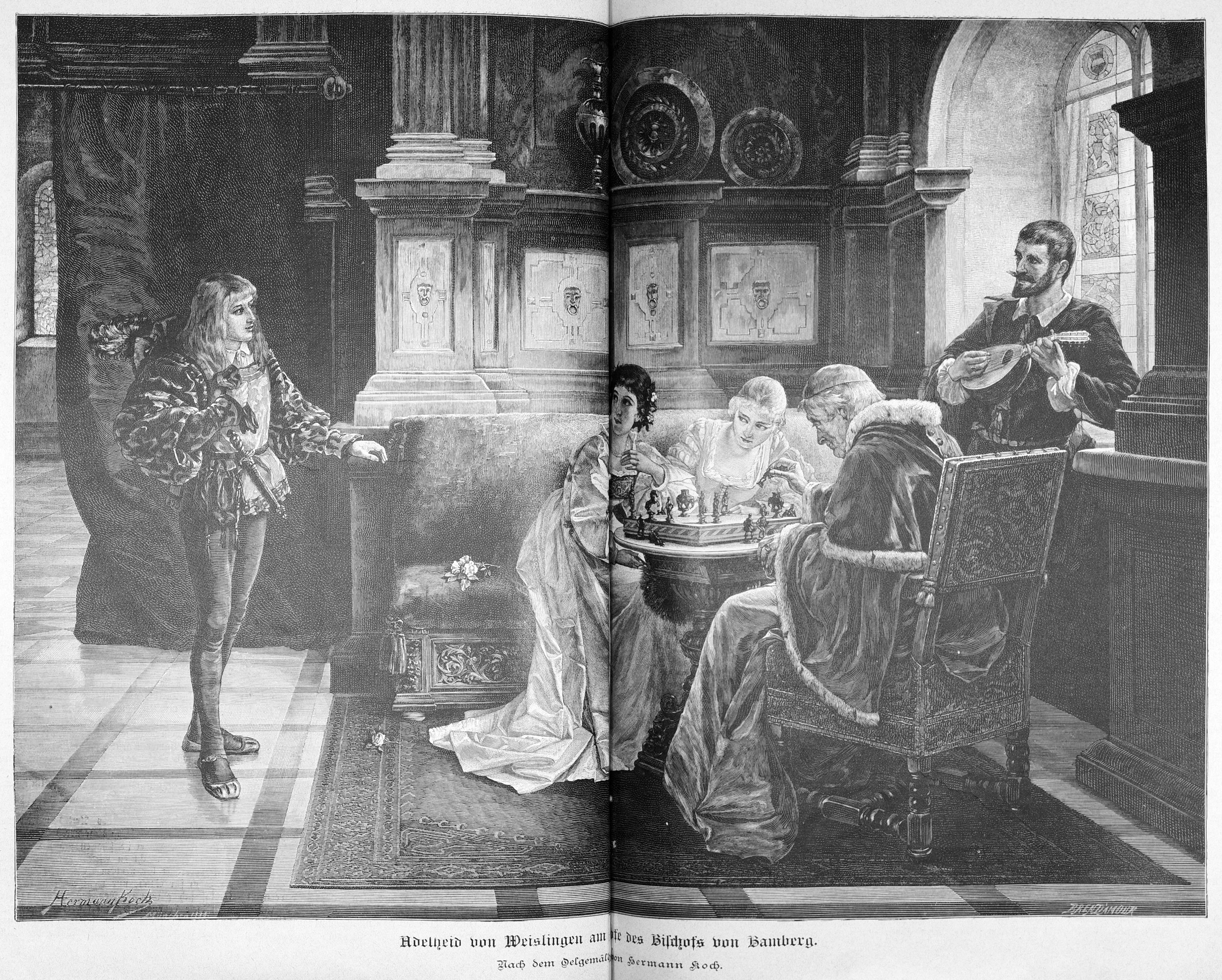
Adelheid von Weislingen am Hofe des Bischofs von Bamberg, Die Gartenlaube (1887), S. 380.

Born in Dömitz, Koch was the son of architect Friedrich Koch (died 1894), who was in the service of the Grand Duke as district building manager, and his wife, Theodore Sophie Elisabeth (née Böttcher). He was baptized on 1 January 1857 in the Johanneskirche of his birthplace under the name of Friedrich August Herrmann Koch. His father initially trained him in Güstrow. He studied sculpture at the Academy of Fine Arts, Nuremberg, with August von Kreling from 1875 to 1877. He then enrolled on 12 October 1877 under the number 3454 as a painting student in the art subject "Nature Class" with Ludwig von Löfftz and Wilhelm von Lindenschmit the Elder. J. at the Academy of Fine Arts, Munich. He studied there until 1882. Koch was a member of the Münchner Künstlergenossenschaft (Munich Artists' Cooperative) and lived in Munich until his death.

Koch is counted among the artists of the "Munich School". His pictures often show ecclesiastical or historical motifs, but also portraits, fruit, still life and flower motifs. His works include Tintoretto, die Leiche seiner Tochter malend (Tintoretto, painting the corpse of his daughter) (1881/82), a painting with which he made his debut at the International Art Exhibition in 1883 in the Glaspalast. Other works were Ave Maria (1883), Ingeborg am Meer mit dem Falken auf der Schulter (Ingeborg am Meer with the falcon on his shoulder) (1886), Das Echo (1888), Beerdigung einer Klosterschwester in Frauenchiemsee (Funeral of a nun in Frauenchiemsee) (1891, second version 1909) and Gräfin Hohenthal-Güchau.

Koch, who had settled on Theresienstraße in Munich, married and had two children. His most important works were created between 1883 and 1914. Some were printed in magazines such as Die Gartenlaube, the Illustrirte Zeitung or the entertainment paper Über Land und Meer. His pictures have been shown at exhibitions and in galleries in Munich, Berlin, Dresden, Düsseldorf and Vienna. The painting Ingeborg am Meer was acquired by Empress Elisabeth of Austria (1837–1898). The Echo went to the Mecklenburg art collection in Schwerin, where it has been listed as a war loss since 1945. Koch died in Munich at the age of 82.

== Literature ==
- Koch, Hermann. In: Hans Vollmer (Hrsg.): General lexicon of fine artists from antiquity to the present. Ulrich Thieme and Felix Becker, editors. Tape 21: Knip – Kruger. EA Seemann, Leipzig 1927, p. 76.
- Horst Ludwig: Koch, Hermann. In: Münchner Maler im 19. Jahrhundert. Band 2: Gebhardt–Küstner. Bruckmann, München 1982, ISBN 3-7654-1633-9 (Gesamtausgabe), S. 351–353 (mit Abbildungen auf S. 350 (Das Echo), 351 (Tintoretto, die Leiche seiner Tochter malend) und 352 (Blindekuh))
