= Paul Koch (footballer) =

Luxembourgish footballer

Personal information
- Date of birth: 7 June 1966 (age 60)
- Place of birth: Luxembourg
- Position: Goalkeeper

Senior career*
Years	Team	Apps	(Gls)
1983–1988	Avenir Beggen		
1990–1991	Red Boys Differdange		
1991–1994	Avenir Beggen		
1994–1998	CS Grevenmacher		
1998–2003	F91 Dudelange		
2003–2005	CS Oberkorn		

International career
- Luxembourg U21
1990–1998	Luxembourg	32	(0)
- * Club domestic league appearances and goals

Paul Koch (born 7 June 1966) is a Luxembourgish former footballer who played as a goalkeeper. He made 32 appearances for the Luxembourg national team from 1990 to 1998.
