= Muhamed Kreševljaković =

Bosnian politician (1939–2001)

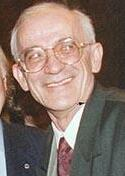
- Kreševljaković in 1994

31st Mayor of Sarajevo
- In office December 1990 – April 1994
- Preceded by: Juraj Martinović
- Succeeded by: Tarik Kupusović

Personal details
- Born: 16 July 1939 Sarajevo, Kingdom of Yugoslavia
- Died: 5 December 2001 (aged 62) Sarajevo, Bosnia and Herzegovina
- Party: Party of Democratic Action
- Relations: Hamdija Kreševljaković (father)
- Education: University of Sarajevo (BA, MA)

Muhamed Kreševljaković (16 July 1939 – 5 December 2001) was a Bosnian politician who served as the 31st mayor of Sarajevo from 1990 to 1994. He was mayor when the Bosnian War broke out in 1992 and for the first two years of the Siege of Sarajevo.

== Family ==
Kreševljaković was the son of Hamdija Kreševljaković, a historian, and Razija (née Ćorović). His paternal grandfather Mehmed (died 1929), was the son of Ibrahim Kreševljaković.

== Mayor of Sarajevo (1990–1994) ==
Kreševljaković was elected Mayor of Sarajevo in the December 1990 elections.

=== Siege of Sarajevo ===
American writer Susan Sontag gained attention for directing a production of Samuel Beckett's Waiting for Godot in a candlelit Sarajevo theatre in the city, that Kevin Myers in the Daily Telegraph called "mesmerisingly precious and hideously self-indulgent." Myers wrote, "By my personal reckoning, the performance lasted as long as the siege itself." However, many of Sarajevo's besieged residents disagreed:

To the people of Sarajevo, Ms. Sontag has become a symbol, interviewed frequently by the local newspapers and television, invited to speak at gatherings everywhere, asked for autographs on the street. After the opening performance of the play, the city's Mayor, Muhamed Kreševljaković, came onstage to declare her an honorary citizen, the only foreigner other than the recently departed United Nations commander, Lieut. Gen. Phillippe Morillon, to be so named. "It is for your bravery, in coming here, living here, and working with us," he said.

Political offices
Preceded by Juraj Martinović	Mayor of Sarajevo; 1990–1994	Succeeded by Tarik Kupusović
