= Hamdija Kreševljaković =

- Born: 16 September 1888; Sarajevo, Austria-Hungary
- Died: 9 May 1959 (aged 70); Sarajevo, SFR Yugoslavia
- Occupation: Historian

Hamdija Kreševljaković (16 September 1888 – 9 May 1959) was a Bosnian and Yugoslav historian.

== Biography ==
Hamdija Kreševljaković was born on 16 September 1888 in Vratnik, a neighbourhood in Sarajevo's Old Town. His father Mehmed (died 1929) was the son of Ibrahim Kreševljaković. Kreševljaković self-identified as an ethnic Croat.

He completed schooling 1 August 1912. Three primary schools in Sarajevo, Kakanj and Gradačac carry his name.

== Descendants ==
Kreševljaković's son Muhamed (1939–2001) served as the Mayor of Sarajevo from 1990 until 1994, during most of the Bosnian War. Muhamed's son, Nihad Kreševljaković, is a historian and the director of the Sarajevo War Theatre. Muhamed's son, Sead Kreševljaković, is a film and documentary producer at Al Jazeera Balkans and the Consul General of the Republic of San Marino in Sarajevo.

== Bibliography ==
- Sarajevo za vrijeme austrougarske uprave (Sarajevo in the time of Austro-Hungarian administration, 1946)
- Vodovodi i gradnje na vodi
