= Paulie Koch =

American world champion wakeboarder (born 1996)

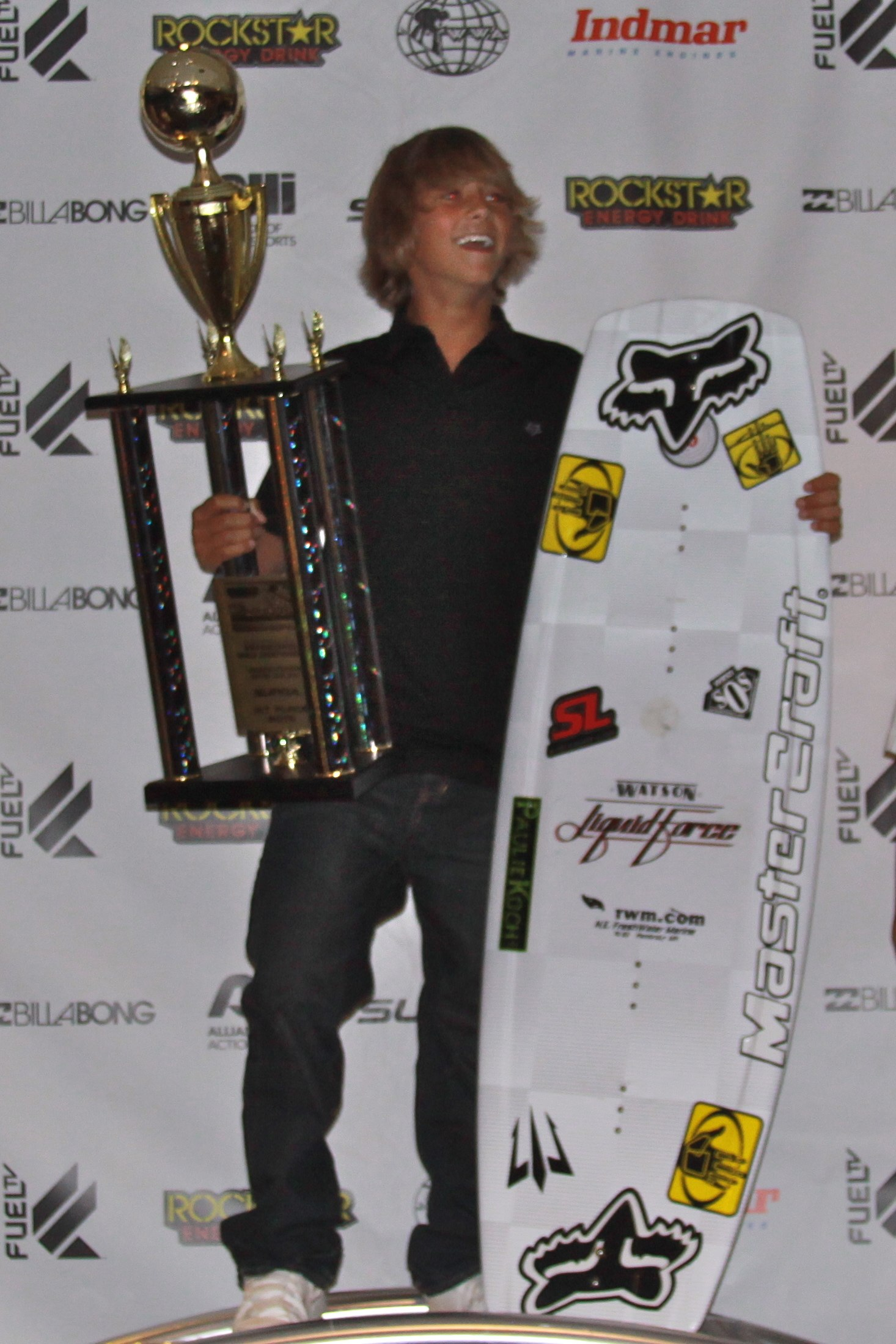
- Koch, 2010 World Championship
- Born: October 12, 1996 (age 29)
- Known for: world champion wakeboarder
- Website: PaulieKoch.com

Paulie Koch (born October 12, 1996) is an American world champion wakeboarder. In 2010 he rose to the top of the wakeboarding world when won the Under 13 Boys 2010 Rockstar WWA Wakeboard World Championships at the age of 13. Paulie started wakeboarding at the age of 5. That same year he started competing in local INT events. Paulie went on to become the 2004 New England Regional Champion and was invited to represent New England at the 2004 INT National Championships. That year he won his first major title, "2004 Mini Outlaw INT National Champion".

On August 6, 2010, at the age of 13, Wakeboarding magazine's website, www.wakeboardingmag.com, ran a news article called "Future Pro Paulie Koch shreds the projects". A few weeks later Paulie was crowned the 2010 WWA wakeboard world champion in the Boys 13 & Under age group.

== Featured on TV ==
Starting in 2010 The Koch kids can now be seen daily wakeboarding on the Disney Channel in Disney’s sports “shorts” called “Getcha Head In The Game”. Paulie Koch and his sisters, Tori, Gabriella and Moxie, were selected to be featured for the next five years in a Disney short film that showcases their Wakeboarding skills and training regimen. The Koch kids signed a contract allowing Disney to air the segment throughout the World.

Disney produced the sports series “Getcha Head In The Game,” which features young athletes practicing and training. The programming is intended to encourage children to participate in sports. Paulie and his sister Tori have trained together since Paulie was 3 years old and participate in wakeboarding. Disney will feature them and their training regimen in the series.

== Sponsors ==
Paulie has had sponsors asking him to ride for them since he was 8 years old. He has stayed loyal to Body Glove and Liquid Force and has now been riding for them for over 5 years. Paulie's sponsors now include:

- Fox Racing
- Nautique
- Liquid Force
- Body Glove
- Go Pro Cameras

== Wakeboarding Achievements ==
- 2010 WWA Wakeboarding World Champion (Boys 13 & Under)
- 2010 USA Wakeboarding National Champion (Boys 13 & Under)
- 2010 WWA Wakeboarding National Championship Best trick award (Best Amateur Trick)
- 2010 WWA Wakeboarding Nationals 3rd Place (Boys 13 & Under)
- 2010 New Jersey Wakeoff Outlaw Champion
- 2010 Board Up Miami 2nd place
- 2009 New England Fresh Water Marine Wakefest Wakeboarding Outlaw Champion
- 2008 New Jersey Wakeoff Expert Champion
- 2004 INT Wakeboarding National Champion
