= Gabriel Koch =

German entomologist (1807–1881)

Gabriel Koch (1807 – 1881) was a German entomologist.

Gabriel Koch lived in Frankfurt. He was mainly interested in Lepidoptera.

His collections, which also include Hymenoptera, are held by Museum für Naturkunde in Berlin, Frankfurt Zoological Society and Senckenberg Museum.

He wrote:

- Die geographische Verbreitung der europäischen Schmetterlinge in anderen Welttheilen. Leipzig: Hermann Costenoble (1854)
- Die schmetterlinge des südwestlichen Deutschlands, insbesondere der umgegend von Frankfurt, Nassau und der Hessischen Staaten; nebst angabe der fundorte und flugplaetze. Cassel, T. Fischer (1856)
- Die Indo-Australische Leidopteren (Fauna) in ihrem Zusammenghang mit der Europaeischen, nebst den drei Hauptfaunen der Erde. Leipzig, L. Dennicke (1865)
- Die Indo-Australische lepidopteren-fauna in ihrem zusammenhang: mit den drei hauptfaunen der erde, nebst abhandlung über die entstehung der farben in der puppe. Berlin: Denicke's verlag Link & Reinke (1873)
- Die Geographische Verbreitung der Schmetterlinge über die Erde. Von G. Koch. Red. von A. Petermann Gotha (1873)
