= Inge Koch (statistician) =

Australian statistician

Inge Koch is an Australian statistician, author, and advocate for gender diversity in mathematics. Koch is the author of Analysis of Multivariate and High-Dimensional Data (2013), and is a Professor in Statistics at the University of Western Australia. Previously, she has worked as an associate professor at University of Adelaide and taught statistics at the University of New South Wales.

From 2015 to 2019, she was the Executive Director of Australian Mathematical Sciences Institute (AMSI)’s Choose Maths Program, encouraging girls and young women to participate in mathematics. In 2004, she cofounded the Girls Do the Maths movement at the University of New South Wales.

Koch completed her PhD in Statistics at the Australian National University in 1991. Her dissertation, Theoretical Problems in Image Analysis, was supervised by Peter Gavin Hall. She completed an MSc at the University of Oxford, and her M.Phil. at the University of London.
