= Nils Samuel von Koch =

Swedish civil servant and Chancellor of Justice

Nils Samuel von Koch (10 March 1801 – 13 June 1881) was a Swedish civil servant who served as Chancellor of Justice. He was the son of Major Nils Koch (who was knighted and took the surname von Koch in 1815).

After completing his legal training and serving in administrative roles, von Koch was appointed in 1841 as head of the Justice Department and then served as Chancellor of Justice from 1848 to 1866. After his father's death in 1848, von Koch took his seat in the Swedish House of Lords and participated in the Diets of the Estates. He was a vocal advocate of legislative reforms to establish a more representative government. In 1866, von Koch was elected to the First Chamber by the Blekinge County Council and was re-elected in 1875. At the 1867 Riksdag he was a member of the Committee on the Constitution.
