= Tilde Fröling =

Swedish actress and presenter

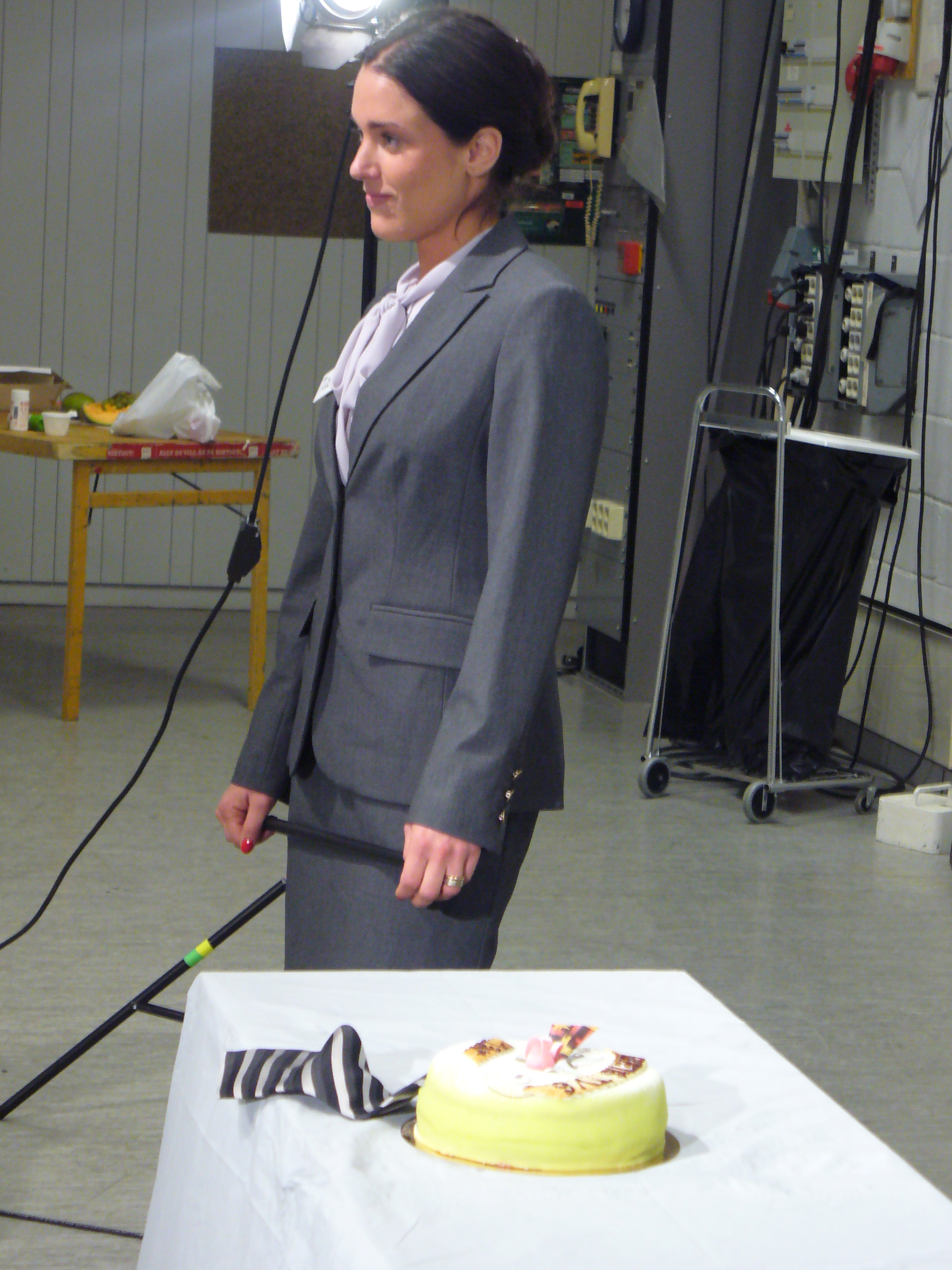
- Fröling in 2007
- Born: Tilde Maria Henny Märta Fröling; 15 May 1980 (age 46); Stockholm, Sweden
- Occupations: Actress, TV presenter
- Years active: 2001–present
- Partner(s): Magnus Lindqvist; Angelo Cantavenera
- Children: 2
- Parent(s): Örjan Ramberg; Ewa Fröling

Tilde Maria Henny Märta Fröling (born 15 May 1980) is a Swedish actress and television presenter. She is the daughter of actors Ewa Fröling and Örjan Ramberg.

Fröling was the winning participant in the 2005 TV3 celebrity version of Expedition Robinson. Currently, she can be seen on Swedish television channels TV6 and TV3, on the TV shows Rocky & Drago with Peter Siepen, and Lustgården respectively. She has figured in a television advertisement with Pontus Gårdinger for the Swedish lager Norrlands Guld, manufactured by Spendrups.

Fröling was a contestant on the television show Let's Dance 2008.

== Filmography ==
- Robinson VIP (2005)
- c/o Segemyhr (2003)
- Strawberries with Real Milk (2001)
- Sprängaren (2001) (English title: Deadline)
