= List of The New York Times number-one books of 2010 =

The American daily newspaper The New York Times publishes multiple weekly lists ranking the best selling books in the United States. The lists are split into three genres—fiction, nonfiction and children's books. Both the fiction and nonfiction lists are further split into multiple lists.

== Fiction ==
The following list ranks the number-one best selling fiction books, in the hardcover fiction category.

The most popular books of the year were The Girl Who Kicked the Hornet's Nest, by Stieg Larsson and The Help, by Kathryn Stockett, with respectively 8 and 6 weeks at the top. The author James Patterson was at the top for five different books (Worst Case, The 9th Judgment, Private, The Postcard Killers and Cross Fire).

Date	Book	Author
January 3	The Lost Symbol	Dan Brown
January 10	The Lost Symbol	Dan Brown
January 17	The Lost Symbol	Dan Brown
January 24	The Help	Kathryn Stockett
January 31	The Help	Kathryn Stockett
February 7	The Help	Kathryn Stockett
February 14	The Help	Kathryn Stockett
February 21	Worst Case	James Patterson
February 28	Worst Case	James Patterson
March 7	The Help	Kathryn Stockett
March 14	Fantasy in Death	J. D. Robb
March 21	House Rules	Jodi Picoult
March 28	House Rules	Jodi Picoult
April 4	The Help	Kathryn Stockett
April 11	Caught	Harlan Coben
April 18	Silver Borne	Patricia Briggs
April 25	Changes	Jim Butcher
May 2	The Shadow of Your Smile	Mary Higgins Clark
May 9	Deliver us from Evil	David Baldacci
May 16	The 9th Judgment	James Patterson and Maxine Paetro
May 23	Dead in the Family	Charlaine Harris
May 30	Dead in the Family	Charlaine Harris
June 6	61 Hours	Lee Child
June 13	The Girl Who Kicked the Hornets' Nest	Stieg Larsson
June 20	The Girl Who Kicked the Hornets' Nest	Stieg Larsson
June 27	The Girl Who Kicked the Hornets' Nest	Stieg Larsson
July 4	The Overton Window	Glenn Beck
July 11	Sizzling Sixteen	Janet Evanovich
July 18	Private	James Patterson
July 25	The Search	Nora Roberts
August 1	The Girl Who Kicked the Hornets' Nest	Stieg Larsson
August 8	The Rembrandt Affair	Daniel Silva
August 15	The Girl Who Kicked the Hornets' Nest	Stieg Larsson
August 22	The Girl Who Kicked the Hornets' Nest	Stieg Larsson
August 29	The Girl Who Kicked the Hornets' Nest	Stieg Larsson
September 5	The Postcard Killers	James Patterson and Liza Marklund
September 12	The Girl Who Kicked the Hornets' Nest	Stieg Larsson
September 19	Freedom	Jonathan Franzen
September 26	Freedom	Jonathan Franzen
October 3	Safe Haven	Nicholas Sparks
October 10	Freedom	Jonathan Franzen
October 17	Fall of Giants	Ken Follett
October 24	The Reversal	Michael Connelly
October 31	American Assassin	Vince Flynn
November 7	Worth Dying For	Lee Child
November 14	The Confession	John Grisham
November 21	Towers of Midnight	Robert Jordan and Brandon Sanderson
November 28	Hell's Corner	David Baldacci
December 5	Cross Fire	James Patterson
December 12	Cross Fire	James Patterson
December 19	Port Mortuary	Patricia Cornwell
December 26	Dead or Alive	Tom Clancy and Grant Blackwood

== Nonfiction ==
The following list ranks the number-one best selling nonfiction books, in the hardcover nonfiction category.

Date	Book	Author	Publisher
January 3	Going Rogue	Sarah Palin	HarperCollins
January 10	Have a Little Faith	Mitch Albom	Hyperion
January 19	Committed	Elizabeth Gilbert	Viking
January 24	Game Change	John Heilemann and Mark Halperin	HarperCollins
January 31	Game Change	John Heilemann and Mark Halperin	HarperCollins
February 7	Game Change	John Heilemann and Mark Halperin	HarperCollins
February 14	Game Change	John Heilemann and Mark Halperin	HarperCollins
February 21	Game Change	John Heilemann and Mark Halperin	HarperCollins
February 28	Game Change	John Heilemann and Mark Halperin	HarperCollins
March 7	Game Change	John Heilemann and Mark Halperin	HarperCollins
March 14	No Apology	Mitt Romney	St. Martin's
March 21	Chelsea Chelsea Bang Bang	Chelsea Handler	Grand Central
March 28	The Big Short	Michael Lewis	Norton
April 4	The Big Short	Michael Lewis	Norton
April 11	The Big Short	Michael Lewis	Norton
April 18	The Big Short	Michael Lewis	Norton
April 25	Oprah: A Biography	Kitty Kelley	Crown
May 2	The Big Short	Michael Lewis	Norton
May 9	The Big Short	Michael Lewis	Norton
May 16	Spoken from the Heart	Laura Bush	Scribner
May 30	Spoken from the Heart	Laura Bush	Scribner
June 6	Spoken from the Heart	Laura Bush	Scribner
June 13	Spoken from the Heart	Laura Bush	Scribner
June 20	Shit My Dad Says	Justin Halpern	HarperCollins
June 27	Shit My Dad Says	Justin Halpern	HarperCollins
July 4	Shit My Dad Says	Justin Halpern	HarperCollins
July 11	Shit My Dad Says	Justin Halpern	HarperCollins
July 18	Shit My Dad Says	Justin Halpern	HarperCollins
July 25	Shit My Dad Says	Justin Halpern	HarperCollins
August 1	The Obama Diaries	Laura Ingraham	Threshold Editions
August 8	Shit My Dad Says	Justin Halpern	HarperCollins
August 15	Shit My Dad Says	Justin Halpern	HarperCollins
August 22	Shit My Dad Says	Justin Halpern	HarperCollins
August 29	Shit My Dad Says	Justin Halpern	HarperCollins
September 5	Shit My Dad Says	Justin Halpern	HarperCollins
September 12	Crimes Against Liberty	David Limbaugh	Regnery
September 19	Crimes Against Liberty	David Limbaugh	Regnery
September 26	The Grand Design	Stephen Hawking and Leonard Mlodinow	Bantam Books
October 3	The Grand Design	Stephen Hawking and Leonard Mlodinow	Bantam Books
October 10	Earth (The Book)	Jon Stewart and others	Grand Central
October 17	Obama's Wars	Bob Woodward	Simon & Schuster
October 24	Obama's Wars	Bob Woodward	Simon & Schuster
October 31	Earth (The Book)	Jon Stewart and others	Grand Central
November 7	Earth (The Book)	Jon Stewart and others	Grand Central
November 14	Life	Keith Richards with James Fox	Little, Brown
November 21	Life	Keith Richards with James Fox	Little, Brown
November 28	Decision Points	George W. Bush	Crown
December 5	Decision Points	George W. Bush	Crown
December 12	Decision Points	George W. Bush	Crown
December 19	Decision Points	George W. Bush	Crown
December 26	Decision Points	George W. Bush	Crown

== See also ==
- Publishers Weekly list of bestselling novels in the United States in the 2010s
