= Sprängaren =

Sprängaren may refer to the following:

- The Bomber, a 1998 book by Liza Marklund (Sprängaren) translated in 2011 by Neil Smith
- Deadline (2001 film) based on the book
