= Siepen (surname) =

Siepen is a German-language habitational surname. Notable people with the name include:

- Marcus Siepen (born 1968), German guitarist
- Peter Siepen (born 1962), Swedish television presenter
