= Annika Bengtzon =

- First appearance: The Bomber
- Last appearance: Without a Trace
- Created by: Liza Marklund
- Portrayed by: Helena Bergström; Malin Crépin

In-universe information
- Gender: Female
- Occupation: Journalist
- Nationality: Swedish

Annika Bengtzon is a fictional character in a Scandinavian noir book and film series created by the Swedish journalist, publisher and crime writer Liza Marklund. With the Annika Bengtzon series, Marklund introduced a female tabloid journalist as the protagonist, in a genre where the main characters had often been men. Current events, like political scandals or women's issues, are often intertwined with the plot, or introduced in subplots.

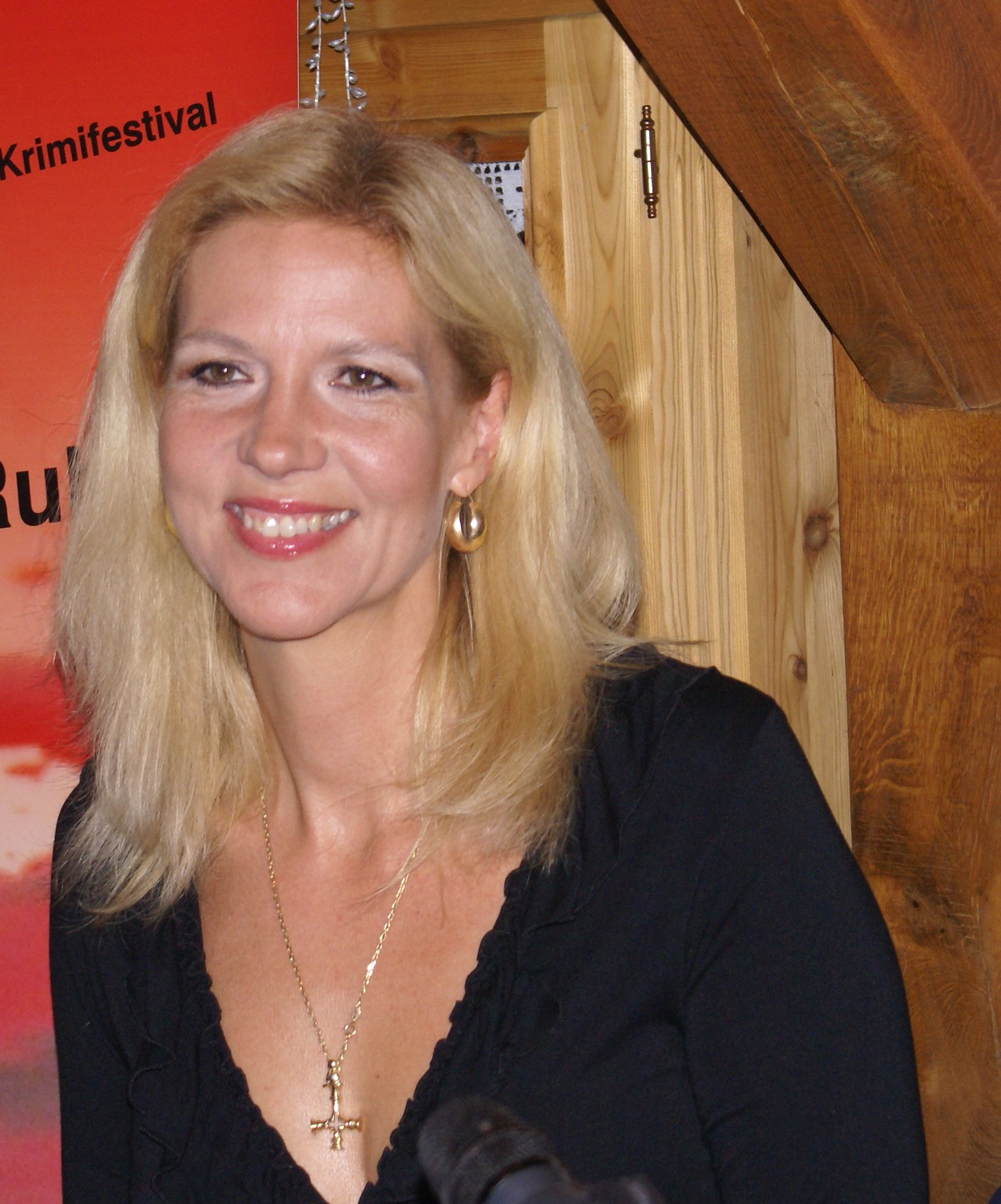
Liza Marklund

== Character ==
Bengtzon works as a journalist for the fictional Swedish newspaper Kvällspressen ("The Evening News"). She hails from Hälleforsnäs in Södermanland but now lives on Kungsholmen island in Stockholm. Alternately described as "courageous and compassionate" as well as "dark" and possessing a "destructive streak within her", she is a career woman juggling a husband and children while facing her employer's tough colleagues. Working as a crime reporter, Bengtzon stumbles into one dangerous situation after another. The character appears in the novels Sprängaren (The Bomber), Studio sex (Studio 69/Exposed), Paradiset (Paradise/Vanished), Prime time, Den röda vargen (The Red Wolf), Nobels testamente (Last Will), Livstid (Lifetime), and En plats i solen (The Long Shadow). She has obvious similarities to the author, with Liza Marklund herself pictured on the book covers. Bengtzon also appears briefly in Jan Guillou's book The Enemy Within. In the book Studio sex, Bengtzon's diary describes how she was beaten so badly by her first husband that she was forced to kill him in self-defense. The children, Kalle and Ellen, are figured in the novels and films, and Bengtzon becomes pregnant in Paradiset.

== In novels ==
As of 2012, there were nine novels which featured the character Annika Bengtzon. The novels were not written in the chronological order of the events depicted in the heroine's life. Starting with Sprängaren, in which Annika is already a deft professional, the story then moves back in time several years, to the start of her career and the meeting with her future husband Thomas. By the fifth installment, Den röda vargen, the reader is back in the present. Books 6, 7 and 8—Nobels testamente, Livstid and En plats i solen—comprise a trilogy, with recurring characters and themes, and plots linked to each other.

By order written, the novels include:

- Sprängaren (1998; English translation The Bomber, trans. Kajsa von Hofsten, 2000; The Bomber, trans. Neil Smith, 2011)
- Studio sex (1999; Studio 69, trans. Kajsa von Hofsten, 2002; Exposed, trans. Neil Smith, 2011)
- Paradiset (2000; Paradise, trans. Ingrid Eng-Rundlow, 2004; Vanished, trans. Neil Smith, 2012)
- Prime Time (2002; Prime Time, trans. Ingrid Eng-Rundlow, 2006)
- Den röda vargen (2003; English translation The Red Wolf, trans. Neil Smith, 2010)
- Nobels testamente (2006; English translation Last Will, trans. Neil Smith, 2012)
- Livstid (2007; English translation Lifetime, trans. Neil Smith, 2013)
- En plats i solen (2008; English translation The Long Shadow, trans. Neil Smith, 2013)
- Du gamla, du fria (2011; English translation Borderline, trans. Neil Smith, 2014)
- Lyckliga gatan (2013; English translation Without a Trace trans. Neil Smith, 2015)

The chronological order is as follows:

1. Studio 69 / Exposed (1999) – takes place eight years before the action of The Bomber
2. Paradise (2000) – a direct continuation of Studio 69 (original English translation) / Exposed (Neil Smith translation)
3. Prime Time (2002) – the action occurs between Paradise and The Bomber
4. The Bomber (1998)
5. Red Wolf (2003) – an independent story which picks up from the end of The Bomber
6. Last Will (2006) – takes place some months after The Red Wolf
7. Lifetime (2007) – a direct sequel to Nobels testamente (Swedish) / Last Will (English)
8. The Long Shadow (2008) – a direct sequel to Livstid (Swedish) / Lifetime (English)
9. Borderline (2011) – takes place three years after Livstid (Swedish) / Lifetime (English)
10. Without a Trace (2013)

== In films ==
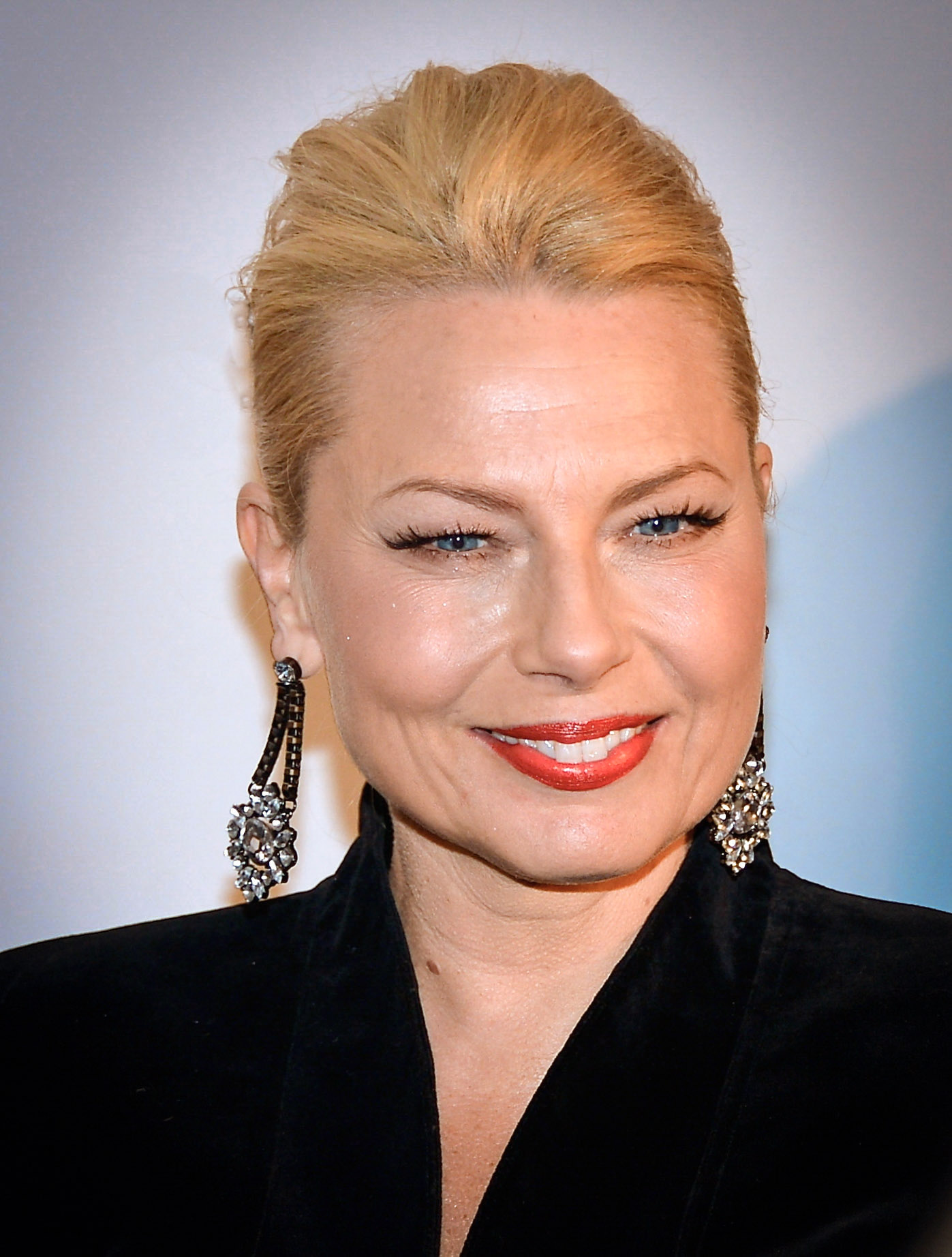
Helena Bergström

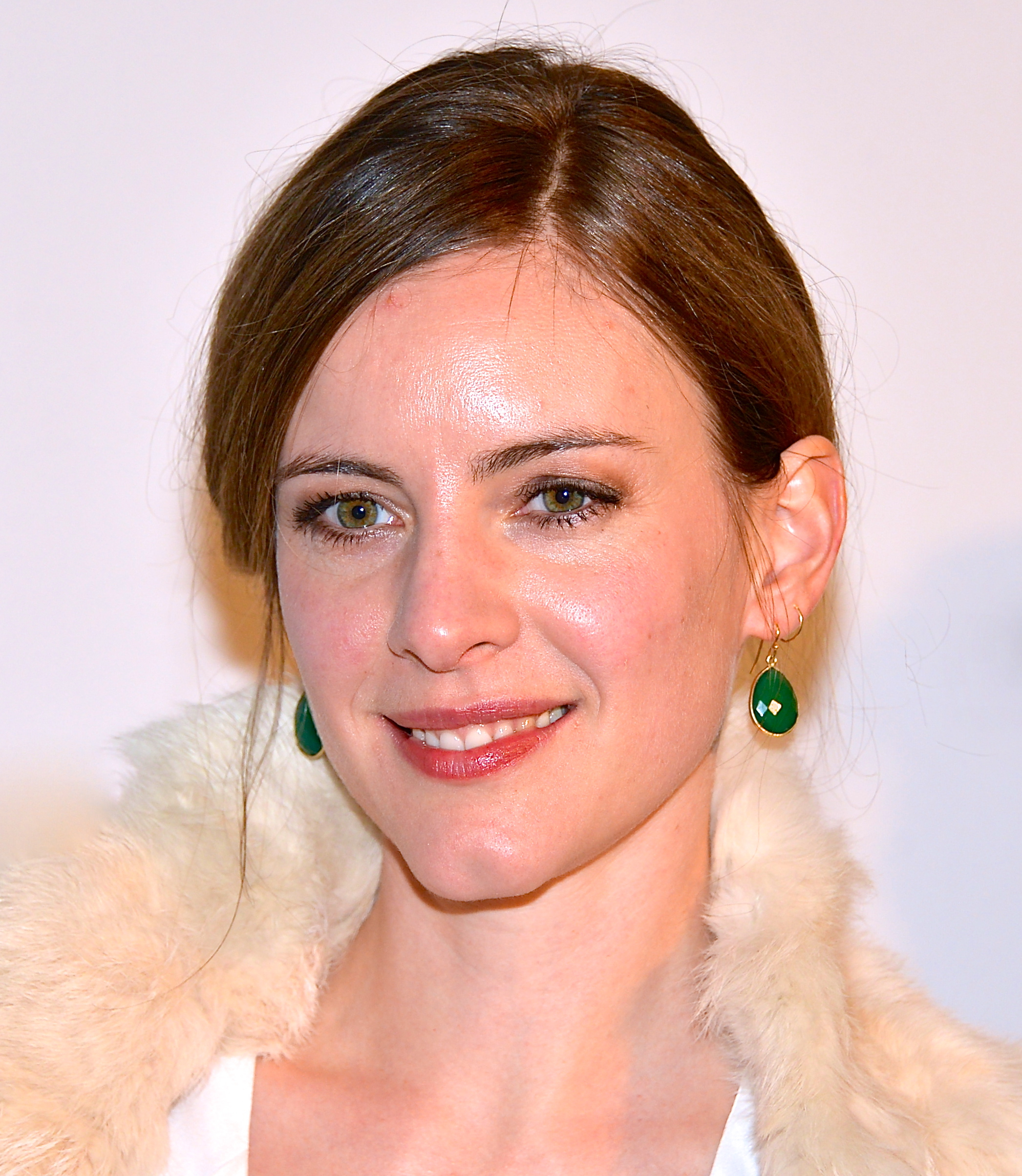
Malin Crépin

Helena Bergström acted as Bengtzon in two films made in the early 2000s; the films were directed by her husband Colin Nutley.

1. Sprängaren — Directed by Colin Nutley; released in 2001
2. Paradiset — Directed by Colin Nutley; released in 2003

The Swedish actress Malin Crépin is best known for her portrayal of Bengtzon in the film series A Case for Annika Bengtzon.

1. Nobel's Last Will (Nobels testamente) — Directed by Peter Flinth; DVD released 20 June 2012
2. Prime Time — Directed by Agneta Fagerström-Olsson; DVD released 4 July 2012
3. Studio 69 (Studio sex) — Directed by Agneta Fagerström-Olsson; DVD released 18 July 2012
4. The Red Wolf (Den röda vargen) — Directed by Agneta Fagerström-Olsson; DVD released 1 August 2012
5. Lifetime (Livstid) — Directed by Ulf Kvensler; DVD released 15 August 2012
6. A Place in the Sun (En plats i solen) — Directed by Peter Flinth; DVD released 29 August 2012
