= Örjan Ramberg =

Swedish actor (1948–2026)

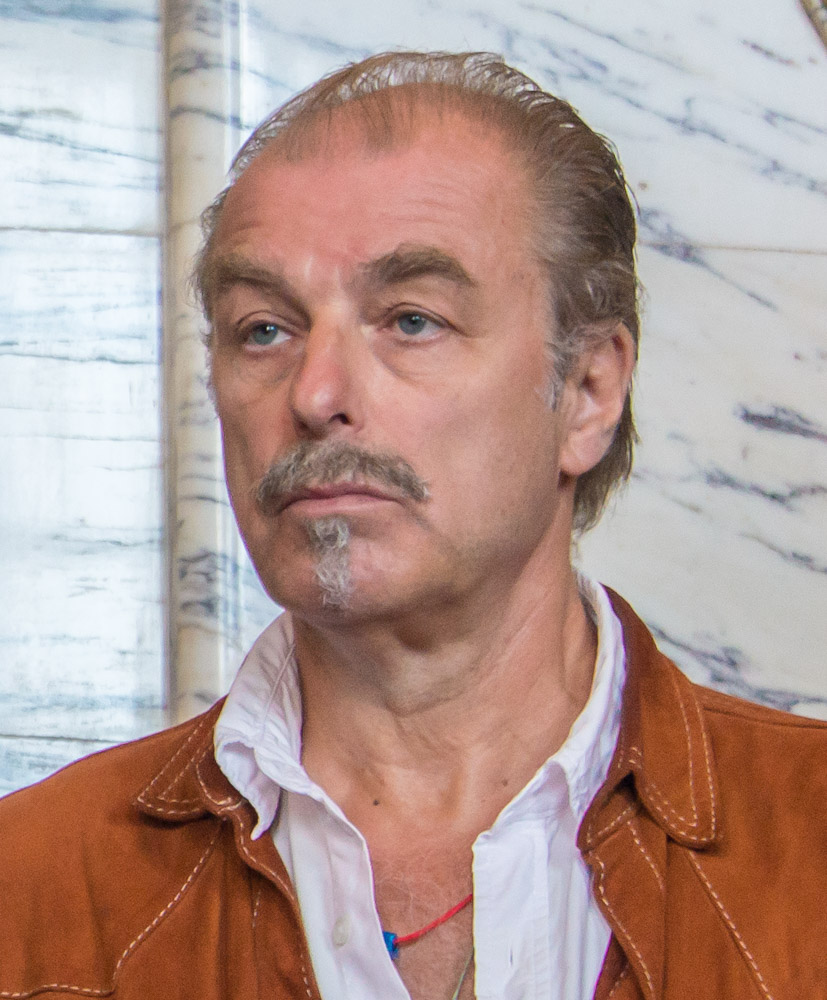
- Ramberg in 2015
- Born: Ralf Örjan Valter Rahmberg; 26 February 1948; Gothenburg, Sweden
- Died: 14 August 2026 (aged 78); Södermalm, Stockholm, Sweden
- Occupation: Actor
- Years active: 1970–2019
- Partners: Ewa Fröling; Lena Olin; Lena Nilsson; Josefin Nilsson
- Children: 3, including Tilde Fröling

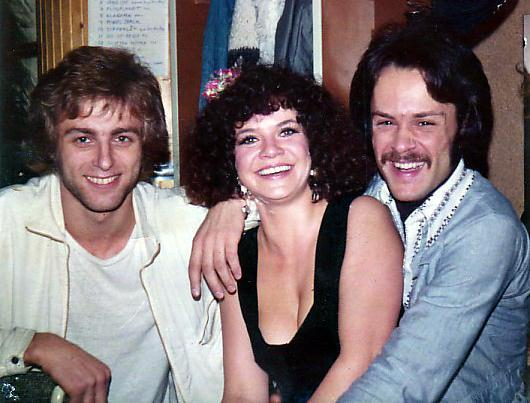
Ramberg (left) with Agneta Lindén and Lars Jacob in the cellar dressing room of the Poor House Cabaret in Stockholm where all three performed in 1974.

Ralf Örjan Valter Ramberg (né Rahmberg; 26 February 1948 – 14 August 2026) was a Swedish actor born in Örgryte, Gothenburg.

== Life and career ==
=== Early work ===
Örjan Ramberg started his acting career in musicals with leading parts in the original Swedish stagings of Hair (1971) and Jesus Christ Superstar (1972; opposite, among others, Agnetha Fältskog (later of ABBA) as Mary Magdalene). He was later educated in the dramatic arts at Sweden's National Academy of Dramatic Art (in Sweden colloquially known as "Scenskolan") in Malmö, 1974–1977. Since 1978, he has been part of Sweden's Royal Dramatic Theatre ensemble.

In 1969, he recorded a single, "Balladen om killen", produced by Göran Lagerberg, which became a minor hit on Tio i Topp, reaching number 13.

=== Acting work ===
On stage, Örjan Ramberg has had both leading and supporting parts: in Nathanael West's En kall miljon (A Cool Million), Ben Jonson's Alkemisten, Marivaux's Paradisbarn, Bulgakov's Mästaren och Margarita, Lars Norén's Natten är dagens mor, Margaretha Garpe's Till Julia, Lessing's Emilio Gallotti, in the stage adaptation of Astrid Lindgren's Emil i Lönneberga (children's theatre production), Shepard's En riktig västern, Shakespeare's Romeo and Juliet, Sommar (Summer) written and directed by Lars Norén, Beaumarchais' Figaros Bröllop (The Marriage of Figaro), Federico García Lorca's Blodsbröllop (Blood Wedding), Shakespeare's Lika för lika (Measure for Measure), Euripides' Medea (directed by Lennart Hjulström), Shakespeare's Så tuktas en argbigga (The Taming of the Shrew) children's play Mio, min Mio (based on the novel by Astrid Lindgren) and in Alfred de Musset's Lek ej med kärleken (On ne badine pas avec l'amour ), among others.

In the 2000s, he has collaborated on stage with directors Ingmar Bergman and John Caird in particular. He portrayed Johansson in Strindberg's classic The Ghost Sonata, directed by Bergman in 2000, Oberon in A Midsummer Night's Dream, directed by Caird in 2000, The Emcee in the musical Cabaret (2001), Malvolio in Twelfth Night (Caird), Ibsen's Gengångare (Ghosts), (directed by Bergman; 2002) and the leading role in Molière's Den inbillade sjuke (The Imaginary Invalid) in 2003.

He appeared as Charles Condomine in Noël Coward's Min fru går igen (Blithe Spirit) (2005), in the co-Nordic production of the Sami staging of Ibsen's Kungsämnena (The Pretenders) and in Shakespeare's Macbeth (directed by Staffan Valdemar Holm) spring/autumn 2006.

On film and television, he appeared sporadically, for example as the investigating photographer Harry Friberg in the Stieg Trenter-crime films for television (Lysande landning, Idag röd, Träff i helfigur) in 1987, as Chief Editor Schyman in Colin Nutley's thriller Sprängaren (aka Deadline/The Bomber), based on the book by Liza Marklund, and his recent supporting part as the bar pianist in TV-series Möbelhandlarens dotter (The Furniture Salesman's Daughter) (2006).

In 1994 Ramberg was awarded the Golden Mask (which is the Swedish equivalent to the Tony Award/s) for Best Actor for his portrayal of Murphy in the stage production of One Flew Over the Cuckoo's Nest (at Folkan 1993/94) and in 2001 he received the prestigious Eugene O'Neill Award.

On 3 February 2007, John Caird's production of Strindberg's The Dance of Death premiered at the Royal Dramatic Theatre with Ramberg in the lead as The Captain (with both original parts of the play performed together; Dödsdansen I-II).

In the spring of 2008, he appeared as King Claudius in Staffan Valdemar Holm's production of Hamlet by Shakespeare (original cast), and in the spring of 2009 in Chekhov's Uncle Vanya.

=== Personal life and death ===
His work with the Royal Dramatic Theatre ended in late March 2019, following demonstrations triggered by a Sveriges Television documentary Josefin Nilsson – Love me for who I am which, without mentioning him by name, revealed his physical and mental aggression, including death threats, against deceased ex-partner Josefin Nilsson.

Besides Nilsson, in the mid-1970s and 1980s, Ramberg was the love partner of Swedish actress and colleague Lena Olin, with whom he has a son. In the 1980s-1990s he also lived with actress Ewa Fröling with whom he has daughter Tilde Fröling.

Ramberg died in the Södermalm borough of Stockholm, on 14 August 2026, at the age of 78.

== Selected filmography ==
- 2008 – Häxdansen (SVT, mini series)
- 2006 – Den enskilde medborgaren
- 2006 – Möbelhandlarens dotter (TV-series)
- 2003 – Paradiset
- 2001 – Sprängaren
- 1996 – Gökboet (One Flew Over the Cuckoo's Nest) (TV-theatre)
- 1996 – Nu är pappa trött igen
- 1994 – Stockholm Marathon
- 1993 – Sökarna
- 1986 – Älska mej
- 1985 – Falsk som vatten
- 1985 – Svindlande affärer
- 1979 – Repmånad eller Hur man gör pojkar av män
- 1987 – Träff i helfigur
- 1987 – I dag röd
- 1987 – Lysande landning
- 1977 – Jack

== Stage work at the Royal Dramatic Theatre ==
- Örjan Ramberg's stage credits at the Royal Dramatic Theatre can be found here (info from "Rollboken" – Dramaten.se).
