= In Your Veins =

- Film poster
- Swedish: I skuggan av värmen
- Directed by: Beata Gårdeler
- Written by: Lotta Thell (novel)
- Screenplay by: Karin Arrhenius
- Produced by: Anna Croneman
- Starring: Malin Crépin; Joel Kinnaman
- Release dates: January 2009 (Göteborg); 20 March 2009
- Running time: 92 minutes
- Countries: Sweden; Norway
- Language: Swedish

In Your Veins (Swedish: I skuggan av värmen; lit. 'In the shadow of the warmth') is a 2009 Swedish/Norwegian drama film. It is based on the autobiographical novel by Lotta Thell. The film adaptation was produced by Anna Croneman and directed by Beata Gårdeler, with the screenplay written by Karin Arrhenius.

== Plot ==
Eva is a security officer struggling with heroin addiction. She tries to hide this secret from her colleagues and her new lover Erik who is a police officer.

== Cast ==
- Malin Crépin as Eva
- Joel Kinnaman as Erik
- Malin Vulcano as Mia
- Camaron Silverek as Samuel
- Martin Aliaga as Tomas
- Marianne Karlbeck-Strååt as paternal grandmother
- Johan Holmberg as Patrik
- Johan Kylén as Ingmar
