= The Postcard Killings =

- Film poster
- Directed by: Danis Tanović
- Screenplay by: Tove Alsterdal; Ellen Brown Furman; Liza Marklund; Andrew Stern; Tena Štivičić
- Based on: The Postcard Killers by Liza Marklund and James Patterson
- Produced by: Paul Brennan; Tracey Edmonds; Leopoldo Gout; Anna Sofia Mörck; Peter Nelson; James Patterson; Miriam Segal; Jeffrey Dean Morgan
- Starring: Jeffrey Dean Morgan; Famke Janssen; Cush Jumbo
- Cinematography: Salvatore Totino
- Edited by: Sean Barton
- Music by: Simon Lacey
- Production company: Good Films Collective
- Distributed by: RLJE Films
- Release date: March 13, 2020
- Running time: 104 minutes
- Country: United States
- Language: English
- Budget: $25 million
- Box office: $181,415

The Postcard Killings is a 2020 American crime film directed by Danis Tanović, starring Jeffrey Dean Morgan, Famke Janssen and Cush Jumbo, and based on the 2010 novel The Postcard Killers by James Patterson and Liza Marklund. The film was released on March 13, 2020, receiving negative reviews from critics.

== Premise ==
Jacob Kanon, a New York detective, investigates the death of his daughter who was murdered while on her honeymoon; he recruits the help of an American journalist working in Sweden, Dessie Lombard, when other couples throughout Europe suffer a similar fate.

The movie opens with someone killing a young couple. It turns out to be Jacob Kanon's daughter and her husband who are in London on their honeymoon. He goes to London to identify the bodies of his daughter and her new husband at the morgue.

After that, Kanon begins an investigation into the identity of the killer. The investigation expands to other European cities as the killer doesn't stop. With the help of Lombard and a German policeman he exposes the truth and understands what's going on.

== Cast ==
- Jeffrey Dean Morgan as Jacob Kanon
- Famke Janssen as Valerie Kanon
- Cush Jumbo as Désirée “Dessie” Lombard
- Joachim Król as Inspector Klaus Bublitz
- Steven Mackintosh as Rupert Pearce
- Naomi Battrick as Sylvia Randolph / Marina Haysmith
- Ruairi O'Connor as Mac Randolph / Simon Haysmith
- Denis O'Hare as Simon Haysmith
- Eva Röse as DS Agneta Hoglund
- Sallie Harmsen as Nienke
- Orla O'Rourke as Nancy
- Christopher Pizzey as Charles Hardwick

== Production ==
In June 2012, it was reported James Patterson was working with European producers to adapt his novel The Postcard Killers that he had co-authored with Liza Marklund to film. In November of that year, it was reported the film had been set up at Good Films, the UK based company of EastEnders producer Miriam Segal. In February 2016, Janusz Kamiński had initially signed on to direct from a script by Marklund and Tove Alsterdal. In October 2018, it was reported Jeffrey Dean Morgan and Connie Nielsen would play the roles of Jacob and Valerie Kanon. In May 2019, it was reported Famke Janssen would be replacing Nielsen as Valerie and that Kamiński had left the film which would be now directed by Danis Tanović.

== Reception ==
On the review aggregator website Rotten Tomatoes, the film holds an approval rating of 22%, based on 23 reviews, with an average rating of 4.2/10. The website's consensus reads, "A bland, poorly written thriller with generic characters and lifeless execution, The Postcard Killings turns a promising idea into a tedious mess." On Metacritic, the film has a weighted average score of 29 out of 100, based on 4 critics, indicating "generally unfavorable" reviews.

Frank Scheck of The Hollywood Reporter wrote: "The filmmakers are clearly hoping that Patterson's name will be enough to attract moviegoers, but this misbegotten effort only serves to further tarnish a cinematic brand already diminished by 2012's Tyler Perry-starrer Alex Cross." Dennis Harvey of Variety said: "This uninspired detour into impersonally commercial English-language terrain for Bosnian director Danis Tanovic (an Oscar winner for 2001's No Man's Land) should provide Patterson's fans and undemanding miscellaneous viewers with an acceptably slick if not-particularly-suspenseful crime potboiler for home viewing." Brian Costello of Common Sense Media awarded the film three stars out of five.

== Sequel ==
A sequel, entitled The Postcard Killer, was announced in May 2024. Renny Harlin is attached to direct, while Morgan and Janssen will reprise their roles. Filming was set to begin in fall 2024 in London, Madrid, Florence and Latvia, but was later pushed to January 2025.
