= Hell (2005 film) =

- Promotional poster
- Directed by: Danis Tanović
- Written by: Krzysztof Kieślowski; Krzysztof Piesiewicz
- Produced by: Marc Baschet; Marion Hänsel; Čedomir Kolar; Yuji Sadai; Rosanna Seregni
- Starring: Emmanuelle Béart; Karin Viard; Marie Gillain; Guillaume Canet; Jacques Gamblin; Jacques Perrin
- Cinematography: Laurent Dailland
- Edited by: Francesca Calvelli
- Music by: Duško Segvić; Danis Tanović
- Distributed by: Diaphana Films (France); 01 Distribution (Italy)
- Release dates: September 9, 2005 (Toronto International Film Festival); November 30, 2005 (France)
- Running time: 102 minutes
- Countries: France; Italy; Japan
- Language: French
- Budget: $5.4 million
- Box office: $595.618

Hell (French: L'enfer) is a French film, released in 2005 and directed by Danis Tanović. It is based on a script originally drafted by Krzysztof Kieślowski and Krzysztof Piesiewicz, which was meant to be the second film in a trilogy with the titles Heaven, Hell and Purgatory. The script was finished by Piesiewicz after Kieślowski died in 1996. The movie stars Emmanuelle Béart, Marie Gillain, and Carole Bouquet. This is the second film Emmanuelle Beart has starred in with the title "L'enfer", the first being directed by Claude Chabrol in 1994. The two films are otherwise unrelated.

== Plot ==
The film is set in Paris and is about three sisters: Celine, Anne and Sophie. It starts with a scene in which a woman and her young daughter (who we later find out is Celine) walk into an office and see two people: her father, and a young man who is naked.

After Sebastian has met Celine a few times much later in their adulthood, following a misunderstanding in which she strips for him as she believes him to be an admirer, he confides to her that he was the young man, and that her father's imprisonment for this crime was actually his fault. He said that he had fallen in love with her father and, finally being alone with him and not knowing what else to do, took off his clothes.

It is revealed that the girls' father tried to see his daughters on his release from prison when they were young. He broke into his ex-wife's apartment and locked her in the kitchen to try to see his daughters and attempts to see them, but they, having been told by their mother what their father has done, have locked themselves in their bedroom. The mother breaks out of the kitchen and he assaults her, leaving her with a brain injury and an inability to speak. He then jumps from the window, killing himself.

In the present day, Anne has an affair with a man who is both the father of her best friend and a Sorbonne professor, by whom she becomes pregnant (while the professor is still married). Sophie's marriage falls apart as her husband has an affair.

Celine contacts her sisters, whom she has not seen for some time even though all three live in Paris, and explains the truth of her father's innocence as revealed by Sebastian. They visit their mother in her beautiful aged care home, and explain that their father's conviction was a mistake, and she was wrong to vilify him. She replies by writing 'I have no regrets', implying an ulterior motive in denouncing her then-husband. The audience is left wondering if he cheated on her, long ago, and thus each of the four women share a tortured history of men in their lives.

== Cast ==
- Emmanuelle Béart – Sophie
  - Marie Loboda – young Sophie
- Karin Viard – Céline
  - Tiffany Tougard – young Céline
- Marie Gillain – Anne
  - Emma Cuzon – young Anne
- Guillaume Canet – Sébastien
  - Julian Ciais – young Sébastien
- Jacques Gamblin – Pierre
- Jacques Perrin – Frédéric
- Carole Bouquet – Marie, the mother
- Miki Manojlović – Antoin, the father
- Jean Rochefort – Louis
- Maryam d'Abo – Julie
- Gaëlle Bona – Joséphine
- Dominique Reymond – Michelle
- Françoise Bertin – The neighbour

== Reception ==
The film received mixed reviews. Philip French panned it as "dull" and Scott Foundas, writing for Variety, called it a "cold, protracted work marked by solid, but passionless performances". Peter Bradshaw praised its vigour and its performances. Valery Kichin, in his review for Film.ru, gave it a 7 out of 10, noting that "the leading divas of French cinema — Emmanuelle Béart, Karine Viard, Marie Gillain, and especially the unexpected Carole Bouquet as the half-mad, paralyzed mother — are unrecognizable here. Perfectly able to portray the soul-searing sexual conflagration, they feel confident in the exotic web of the 'mysterious Slavic soul', apparently having thoroughly studied both Chekhov and Dostoevsky".
