= Gömda =

Book by Liza Marklund

Gömda (Buried Alive) is the 1995 literary debut of Swedish author Liza Marklund. It is the first novel in the Maria Eriksson series.

The novel is based on a true story and deals with a woman who is abused by her boyfriend and forced into hiding. It was re-worked and re-released in 2000, and the new edition became one of the best selling books of all times in Sweden.

The pseudonym used for the main character in the series is "Maria (or Mia) Eriksson", who is also listed as a co-author of the first editions of the two books in the series.

== Plot ==
Buried Alive tells the story of "Mia" and "the man with the black eyes", an immigrant from Lebanon, that soon turns into an abusive relationship. They have a child together and they break up, but the abuse continues and is intensified when "Mia" remarries. The welfare state is not able to protect the family, and they are forced into hiding.

== Sequels ==
A second book in the Maria Eriksson series, Asylum Granted, was published in 2004. It describes how the woman is forced to flee abroad with her family. Finally, in February 2003, she is granted asylum in the United States, on grounds of domestic violence. The story received a lot of attention in Sweden, and was even discussed in the Swedish Parliament.

"The man with the black eyes" is the antagonist also in Asyl Den Sanna Fortsättningen på Gömda (Asylum Granted - A True Story), the second book in the series, published 9 years later. The book tells the story of how the abuser forced the woman and her new family to flee abroad. They left Sweden for South America and then spent five years in the United States, attempting to establish asylum. "Maria Eriksson" submitted her application as a victim of domestic violence and gender-based abuse. "Maria Eriksson" was granted asylum on February 25, 2003.

== Controversy ==
Swedish journalist Monica Antonsson released a book in 2008 criticising the factual background of Buried Alive. Liza Marklund and her publisher argued that although some changes were made to make identification more difficult, the bulk of the story was factually correct. They conceded, though, that the novel should have been labeled as "based on a true story", rather than as "a true story".

Antonsson criticised that Maria Eriksson's grades and jobs were not factually correct, and that the ethnicity of a boyfriend and his criminal record was not reflected in the books. For example, the hospitalization of "the man with the black eyes" after aggravated assault by "Maria Eriksson's" Chilean husband, who was convicted and imprisoned for one year due to the assault, was not mentioned in the book.

In response to the criticism, Marklund has stated that she considers the bulk of the story to be factually correct and neither exaggerated nor deceptive. She has noted that the story is supported by hundreds of official documents from the courts and the social services. She has also written that she did not know of the aggravated assault committed by "Mia Eriksson's" Chilean husband, and that she read about for it the first time in Monica Antonsson's book. However, she noted that if Antonsson's information about the records is correct, then the court's decision confirms that the family was being harassed by "Maria Eriksson's" ex-boyfriend.

The controversy has been compared to the controversy surrounding Per Olov Enquist's Legionärerna and led to academic work studying the audience's relation to documentary novels. The genre is based on a mix of fact and fiction, where the author's own interpretation is part of the genre's conventions. The documentary novel often has a political objective, which in Buried Alive was to bring to the fore an abused woman's exposed situation. The genre also, like many Hollywood movies, uses popular clichés to appeal to a broader audience.

Gömda (Buried Alive) was initially released by Bonniers in 1995 and marketed under the category "autobiography/biography" in the publishing industry's catalogue. It was re-worked and re-released by Piratförlaget in 2000 as Buried Alive - A True Story and marketed as a "documentary novel", a term used by Piratförlaget also for the edition published by Bonniers.

In January 2009, the Swedish National Bibliography and the public libraries of Sweden reclassified all editions as fiction due to questions raised about the factual nature of the book. The classification of Asylum - the True Continuation of Buried Alive was not altered as it had been classified as fiction from the very beginning.

A spokesperson and part-owner of the Piratförlaget, Jan Guillou, has told the press that the company regrets that the book was marketed as "a true story" and that "based on a true story" would have been better. In Expressen, the evening tabloid where Marklund worked, another part-owner of the publishing company, Ann-Marie Skarp, has stated that readers could not have been fooled by the label "true story" because, she argued, intelligent readers understand that the book is a novel based on reality and that it is not meant to be a biography.

Kerstin Angelin at the initial publisher, Bonnier Alba, has also commented in the press on the controversy by saying: "The storyline, the bulk of the story, must be correct for it to be called a true story. However, for various reasons one may not want to expose individuals with name and professions, out of concern for them. It is perfectly reasonable that not every detail is true."

After the controversy regarding the truthfulness of the books, "Mia" revealed her identity in 2009 in order to confirm her story. Today she lives with a new husband in Arizona. Since 2006 she has written three additional books about her life and about domestic violence, but without Liza Marklund being involved.
