= Martin Aliaga =

Swedish actor

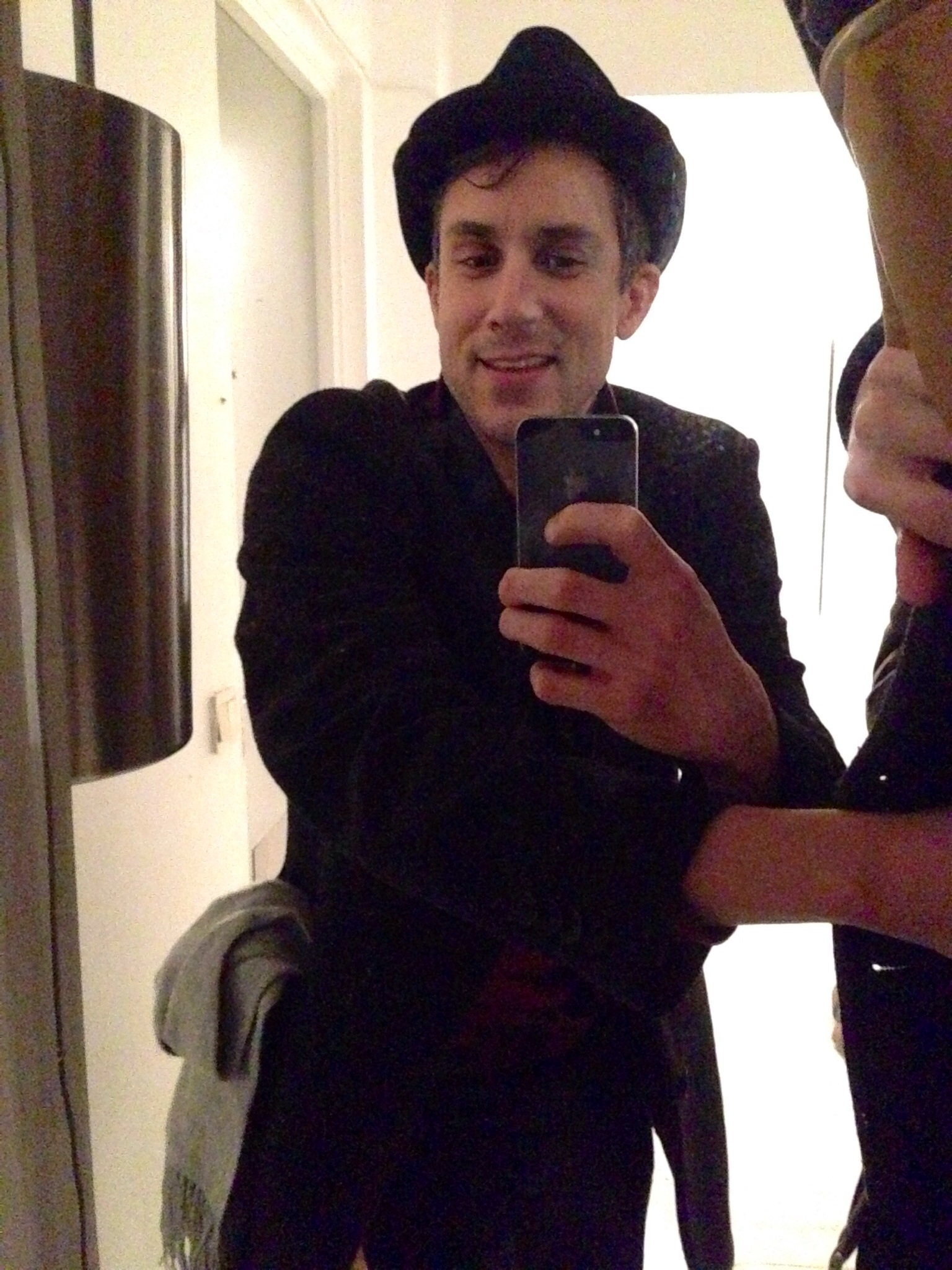
Martin Aliaga in 2014

Martin Julio Aliaga Bungerfeldt (born 30 April 1971) is a Swedish actor.

In 2000, Aliaga finished his education at NAMA. He has been engaged at the Royal Dramatic Theatre, Stockholm City Theatre and Teater Tribunalen. He is married to Josefin Crafoord and together they have a son.

== Selected filmography ==
- Johan Falk – Leo Gaut (2009)
- In Your Veins (2008)
- 2007 – Gangster
- Överallt och ingenstans (2003)
- Beck – Hämndens pris (2001)
- 2001 – Festival
- 1998 – Längtans blåa blomma
- Kvinnan i det låsta rummet (1997)
- Sairaan kaunis maailma (1997)
- 1996 – Anna Holt
- 1995 – Svarta skallar och vita nätter
