= Mediha Musliović =

Bosnian actress (born 1975)

- Born: 28 February 1975 (age 51); Sarajevo, SR Bosnia and Herzegovina, SFR Yugoslavia
- Education: Academy of Performing Arts in Sarajevo
- Occupation: Actress
- Years active: 2001–present

Mediha Musliović (born 28 February 1975) is a Bosnian actress. She graduated in 1998 at the Academy of Performing Arts in Sarajevo.

== Filmography ==
=== Films ===
Film
Year	Title	Role	Notes
2001	Sugar-Free		Short
2001	Borac		TV movie
2003	Viza za budućnost: Novogodišnji specijal	Ranka	TV movie
2007	Estrellita	Sabina	
2008	Cuvari noci	Senada	
2009	Zena u Ljubicastom	Woman in Purple	Short
2010	Jasmina	Naida	
2012	Venuto al mondo		
2013	Cefurji raus!	Ranka	
2014	The November Man	Natalia Ulanova	
2015	Our Everyday Life	Sabina	
2021	Not So Friendly Neighborhood Affair	Enes's Wife	
2023	Excursion		
2026	The Widower		

=== TV series ===
Film
Year	Title	Role	Notes
2002–2005	Viza za budućnost	Ranka	32 episodes
2004–2006	Crna hronika	Edina	21 episodes
2008	Lud, zbunjen, normalan	Nevena	3 episodes
2023–2024	Princ iz Eleja	Tetka	12 episodes
