= Ewa Fröling =

Swedish actress (born 1952)

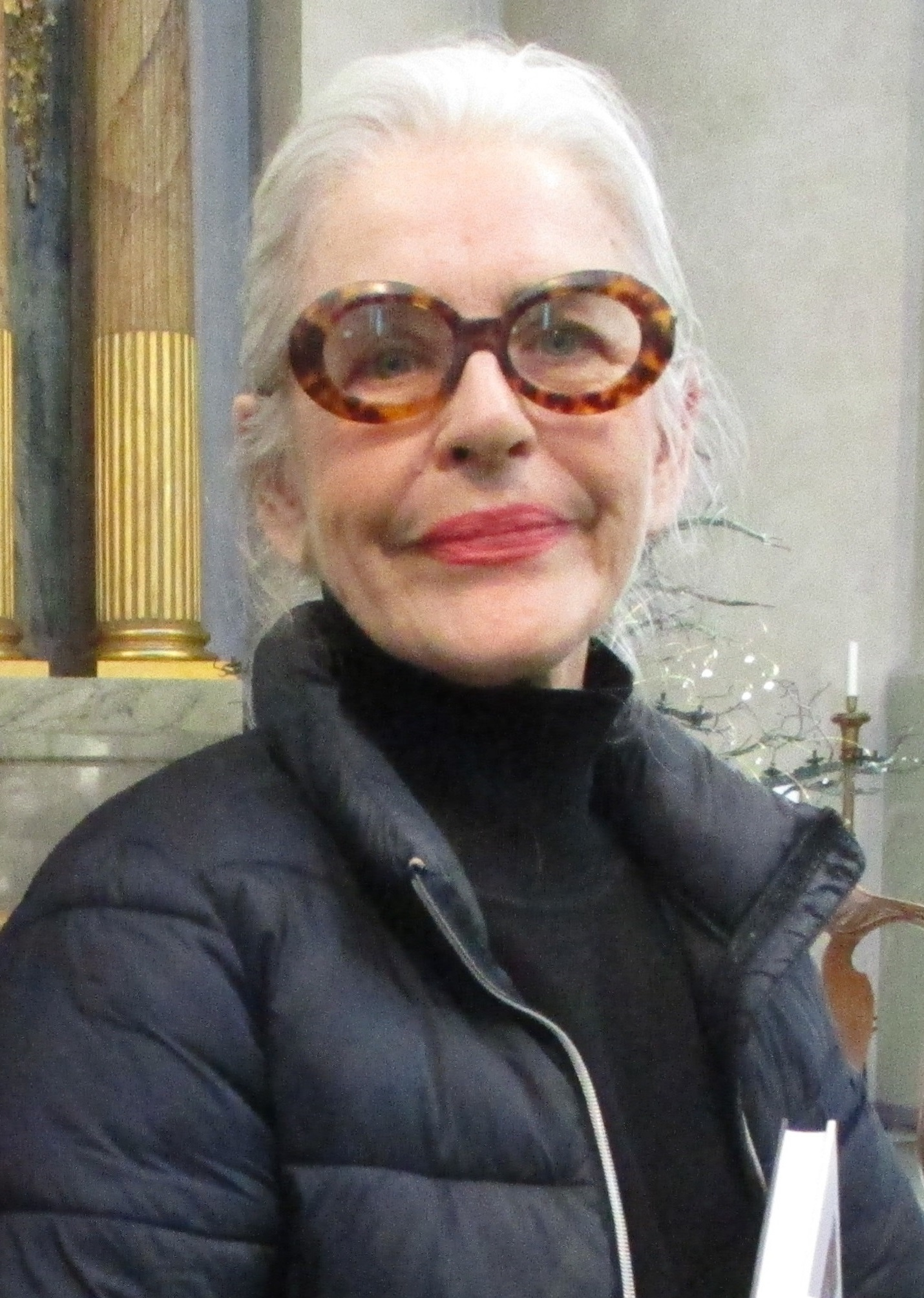
- Fröling in 2023
- Born: Eva Marie Fröling; 9 August 1952 (age 73); Stockholm, Sweden
- Occupation: Actress
- Years active: 1973–present
- Partner(s): Örjan Ramberg; Thomas Hedberg
- Children: 2, including Tilde Fröling

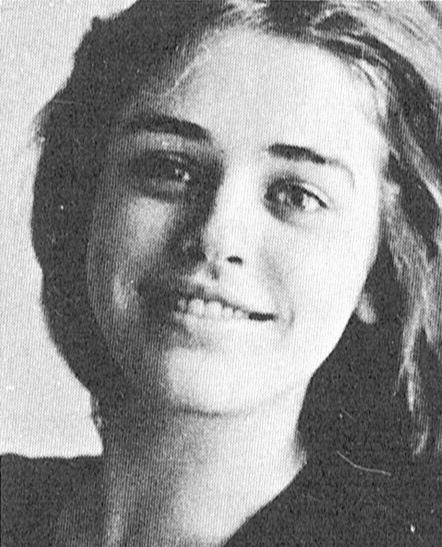
Fröling as a drama student

Ewa Fröling (Eva Marie Fröling; born 9 August 1952) is a Swedish actress who was born in Stockholm. She is internationally most recognized for her leading parts in Gunnel Lindblom's Sally och friheten (as Sally) and Ingmar Bergman's Fanny and Alexander (as Emilie).

Fröling studied at Sweden's Theatre Academy (Teaterhögskolan) in Malmö and from 1977 to 1988 was an actress at Sweden's national stage, the Royal Dramatic Theatre where Fröling appeared in plays such as Stiftelsen directed by Alf Sjöberg, as Johanna in Bertolt Brecht's Heliga Johanna från slakthusen (Saint Joan of the Stockyards) and in Ingmar Bergman's classic 1984 staging of Shakespeare's King Lear (as Regan). In the 1990s, she worked mainly at Stockholms stadsteater (Stockholm City Theatre). Ewa Fröling was back on stage at the Royal Dramatic Theatre; in the title role as Vera in the success play by popular Swedish playwright Kristina Lugn, 2005.

Fröling has been married to actor Örjan Ramberg with whom she has a daughter, Tilde. She participated in Let's Dance 2016 which was broadcast on TV4.

== Selected filmography ==
- 1979: Katitzi (TV series)
- 1980: Välkommen hem (TV theatre)
- 1981: Sally and Freedom
- 1981: Peter-No-Tail (Pelle Svanslös) (voice only)
- 1982: Fanny and Alexander
- 1983: G
- 1983: Två killar och en tjej
- 1987: Träff i helfigur
- 1987: Jim & Piraterna Blom
- 1988: S.O.S. - En segelsällskapsresa
- 1991: The Ox
- 1993: Sista Dansen
- 2000: Gossip
- 2001: Sprängaren
- 2003: Paradiset
- 2004: The Incredibles (Edna Mode in the Swedish version of film)
- 2005: Robotar
- 2009: The Girl with the Dragon Tattoo (Män som hatar kvinnor)
