= Malin Crépin =

Swedish actress (born 1978)

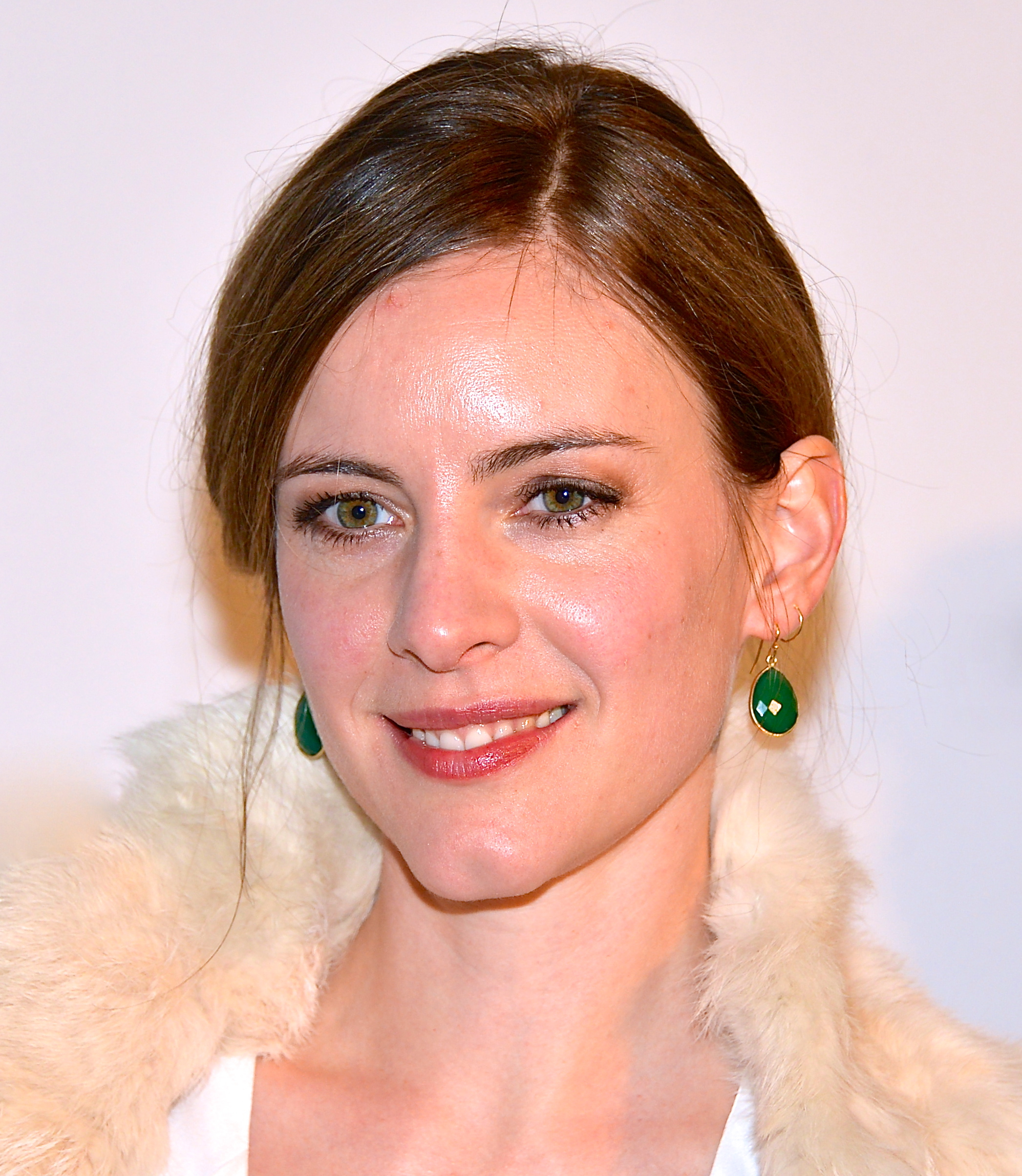
- Crépin in 2013
- Born: 22 August 1978 (age 48); Stockholm, Sweden
- Education: Malmö Theatre Academy
- Occupation: Actress
- Years active: 1998–present
- Spouse: Markus Crépin Sundström
- Children: 2

Malin Crépin (born 22 August 1978, in Stockholm), is a Swedish theater, film, and television actress. She has starred in several movies and is best known for starring as the titular character in the Swedish film series A Case for Annika Bengtzon.

== Life and career ==
Malin Crépin was born in Stockholm in 1978. She graduated from the Malmö Theatre Academy in 2002. Since then, she has been active in the Stockholm City Theatre and at the Swedish National Theater, in Stockholm..

Crépin has also played in films and television series. Crépin embodied in 2012, the main role of the journalist Annika Bengtzon from the books by the Swedish novelist Liza Marklund.

== Awards ==
- 2008: Rising Star Award for Best Newcomer of the Year at the Stockholm International Film Festival
- 2010: Nominated for the Guldbagge Award for Best Actress in the film In Your Veins

== Filmography ==
- 2003: Assistanten (short movie)
- 2003: Miffo, as Anna
- 2005: Lasermannen, as Annika
- 2007: Upp till kamp (TV miniseries), as Nina
- 2009: In Your Veins as Eva (I skuggan av värmen) together with Joel Kinnaman
- 2010: Cornelis, as Ingalill Rehnberg
- 2010: Kommissarie Winter - Den sista vinter (TV movie), as Gerda Hoffner
- 2011: Oslo, August 31st (Oslo, 31. august), as Malin
- 2011: Människor helt utan betydelse (short movie)
- 2012: Kiruna-Kigali (short movie), as Nina
- 2012: Annika Bengtzon – Nobel's Last Will
- 2012: Annika Bengtzon – Prime Time (TV movie)
- 2012: Annika Bengtzon - Studio Sex (TV movie)
- 2012: Annika Bengtzon - Den röda vargen (TV movie)
- 2012: Annika Bengtzon – Livstid (TV movie)
- 2012: Annika Bengtzon - En plats i solen (TV movie)
- 2014: Lulu (short movie, ) as Lulu
- 2015: Nylon (short movie), as Isabel
- 2016: The Medium, as Martha
- 2016: Sameblod (Sami Blood)
- 2020: Morden i Sandhamn, as Vicky
- 2022: Don't Look at the Demon, as Martha
- 2022: Bäckström, as Sanna

== Theater ==
- 2000: Ben Elton's Popcorn
- 2002: Arthur Miller's Utiskt Från En Bro (A View From A Bridge)
- 2002: Petra Berg-Holbeck's Starck
- 2004: Shakespeare's A Midsummer´s Night Dream
- 2005: Aldous Huxley's En Helskön Ny Värld (A Brave New World)
- 2006: Lars Norén's Terminal
- 2006: Henrik Ibsen's Little Eyolf
- 2008: Jean Genet's Jungfruleken (The Maids)
- 2008: Lars Norén's A La Mémoire Dánna Politkovskaia
- 2008: Jez Butterworth's Överwintrare (The Winterling)
- 2016: Rona Munro's The James Plays
