= Liza Marklund =

Swedish journalist and crime writer (born 1962)

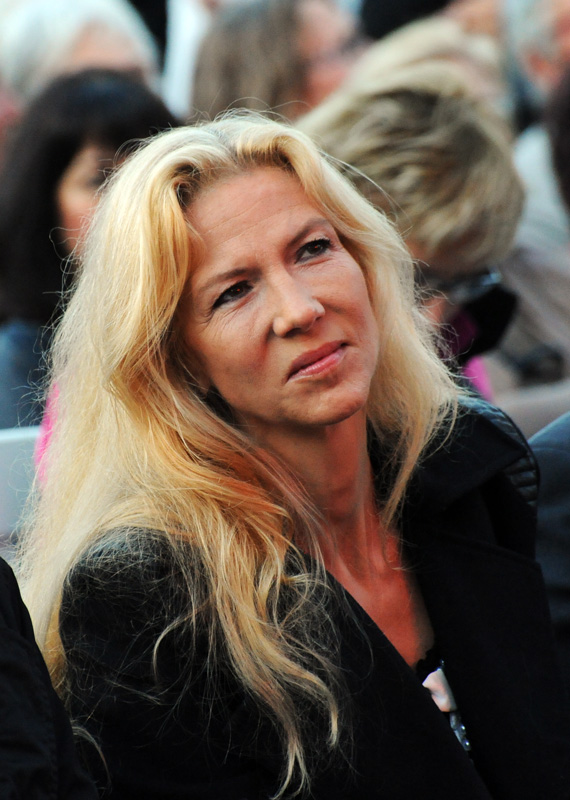
- Liza Marklund, 2013
- Born: Eva Elizabeth Marklund; September 9, 1962 (age 63); Pålmark, Sweden
- Occupation: Crime novelist
- Writing career
- Genres: Crime fiction, mystery fiction, detective fiction
- Subjects: Crime, thriller, mystery, detective
- Notable works: The Bomber, Studio 69, Paradise
- Website: www.lizamarklund.se

Eva Elisabeth "Liza" Marklund (born 9 September 1962) is a Swedish journalist and crime writer.

Her novels, of which most feature the fictional newspaper journalist Annika Bengtzon, have been published in forty languages. Marklund is the co-owner of Sweden's third largest publishing house, Piratförlaget, and has worked as a journalist as well as a goodwill ambassador for UNICEF.

== Life ==
She was born in Pålmark near Piteå, Norrbotten. Marklund lives in Spain with her husband Mikael.

== Career ==
Since her debut in 1995, Liza Marklund has written eleven crime novels in her Annika Bengtzon series, the stand-alone novel The Black Pearl Farm as well as the first novel in her new series, The Polar Circle Trilogy. In addition, she has co-authored two documentary novels with Maria Eriksson and one non-fiction book about female leadership with Lotta Snickare. Marklund's crime novels featuring crime reporter Annika Bengtzon have become international bestsellers. She won the "Poloni Prize" (Polonipriset) 1998 for "Best Swedish Crime Novel by a Female Writer" and "The Debutant Prize", (Debutantpriset) 1998 for "Best First Novel of the Year" with the crime novel Sprängaren (The Bomber), published in 1998. Marklund was named Author of the Year in Sweden 1999 by the Swedish trade union SKTF, won the radio network RixFM's Swedish Literary Prize in 2007, and was selected the fifteenth most popular woman in Sweden of 2003 and the fourth most popular woman in Sweden of 2004 in a yearly survey with 1,000 participants, conducted by ICA-kuriren, a publication published by a Swedish supermarket chain.

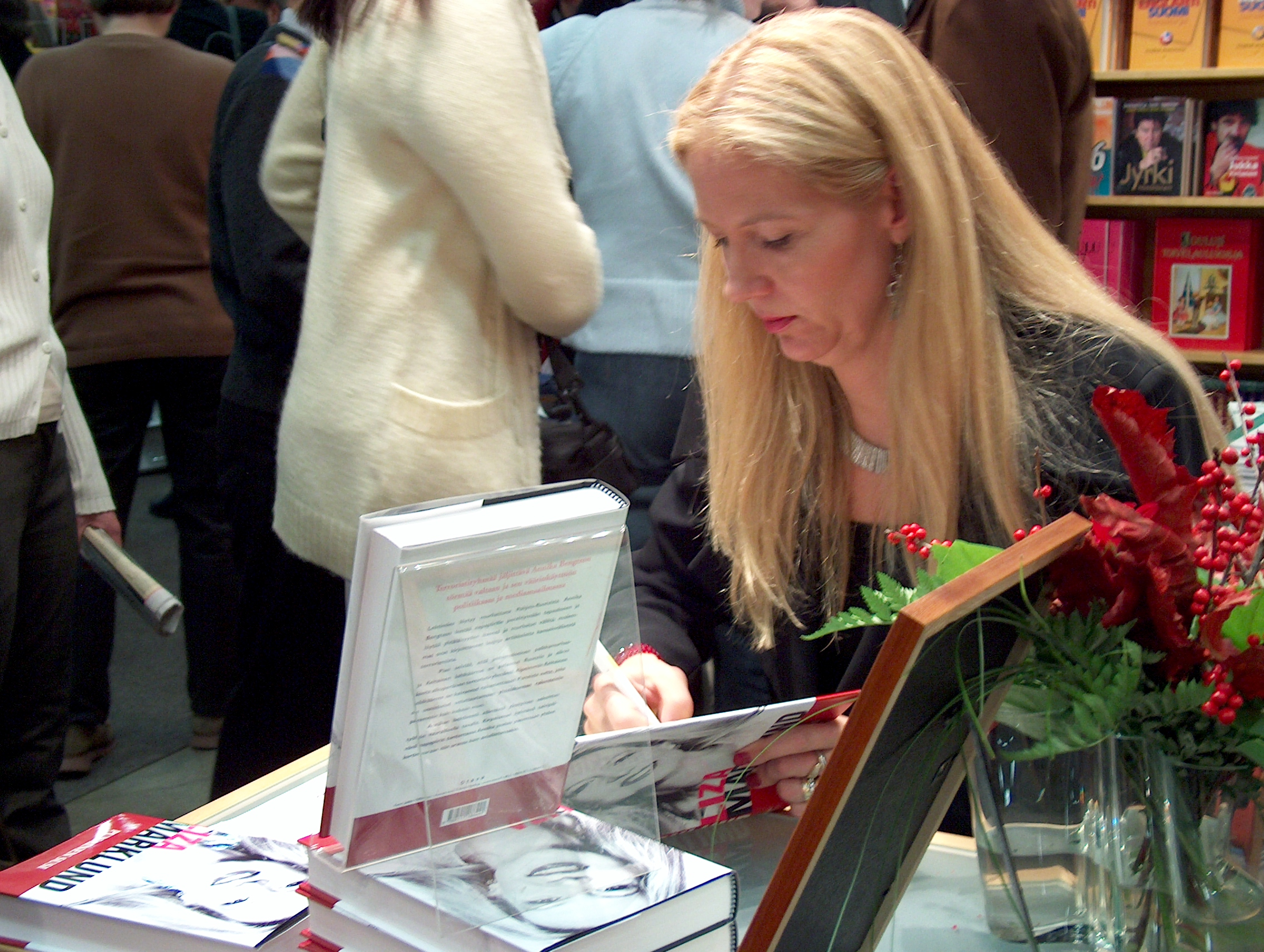
Marklund signing books at Helsinki Book Fair 2003

Her books have been number one bestsellers in all five Nordic countries. In 2002 and 2003, two of Liza Marklund's crime novels were listed on the international bestseller lists by the online magazine Publishing Trends, Prime Time ranking #13 and The Red Wolf ranking #12. In Scandinavia and Germany, her non-fiction novels have become the center of a heated controversy.

The Postcard Killers, a crime thriller written in collaboration with American bestselling author James Patterson, was published on January 27, 2010, in Sweden and became number one on the Swedish bestseller list in February 2010. It was published on 16 August 2010 in the United States. At the end of August, it reached number one in the New York Times Best Seller list, making Liza Marklund the second Swedish author (the first one being Stieg Larsson with the Millennium Trilogy) to reach the number one spot.

Buried Alive: A True Story is the 1995 literary debut of Swedish author Liza Marklund. It is the first novel in the Maria Eriksson series. The novel is based on a true story and deals with a woman who is abused by her boyfriend and forced into hiding. Swedish journalist Monica Antonsson released a book in 2008 criticising the factual background of Buried Alive leading to a public debate about the book and the public libraries of Sweden reclassifying all editions from non-fiction to fiction.

The Annika Bengtzon series consists of eleven books. The framework of the Annika Bengtzon series is crime reporter Annika's hectic life, at a bustling tabloid called Kvällspressen in Stockholm, Sweden. Her conflict lies in combining motherhood with her career ambitions. Prior to The Bomber, there were very few female commercially successful crime writers in Sweden. Marklund placed 22nd on the list of the most influential media personality of 2008 in Sweden, a list established yearly by the trade magazine for the advertising industry, Resumé.

Two films based on Annika Bengtzon novels, The Bomber and Paradise (2003), have been filmed in Swedish by the English director Colin Nutley. The actress Helena Bergström starred in the role as Annika Bengtzon in both movies. They premiered in 2001 and 2003. In 2009, the film and TV production company Yellow Bird bought the rights to adapt an additional six Annika Bengtzon novels for the screen: Studio 69, Prime Time, The Red Wolf, Nobel's Last Will, Lifetime, and A Place in the Sun. In these six films Annika Bengtzon is played by Swedish actress Malin Crépin.

== UNICEF ambassador ==
In 2004 Liza Marklund was appointed ambassador for the United Nations Children's Fund, UNICEF. The reason was her long interest in issues related to human rights. She travels regularly on behalf of the UNICEF and has, among other things, especially covered questions related to child slavery and children with HIV and AIDS in the third world.

== Works ==
=== Novels ===
Maria Eriksson series:

1. Buried Alive: A True Story (Gömda: en sann historia) (1995; updated edition 2000), with Maria Eriksson
2. Asylum Granted: A True Story (Asyl: den sanna fortsättningen på Gömda (2004), with Maria Eriksson

Annika Bengtzon series, by chronological order:

1. Studio 69, or Exposed (Studio sex) (1999), English translation Studio 69, trans. Kajsa von Hofsten, 2002; Exposed, trans. Neil Smith, 2011
2. Paradise, or Vanished (Paradiset) (2000), English translation Paradise, trans. Ingrid Eng-Rundlow, 2004; Vanished, trans. Neil Smith, 2012
3. Prime Time (2001), English translation Prime Time, trans. Ingrid Eng-Rundlow, 2006
4. The Bomber (Sprängaren) (1998), English translation The Bomber, trans. Kajsa von Hofsten, 2000; The Bomber, trans. Neil Smith, 2011
5. The Red Wolf (Den röda vargen) (2003), English translation The Red Wolf, trans. Neil Smith, 2010
6. Last Will (Nobels testamente) (2006), English translation Last Will, trans. Neil Smith, 2012
7. Lifetime (Livstid) (2007), English translation Lifetime, trans. Neil Smith, 2013
8. The Long Shadow (En plats i solen) (2008), English translation The Long Shadow, trans. Neil Smith, 2013
9. Borderline (Du gamla, du fria) (2011), English translation Borderline, trans. Neil Smith, 2014
10. Without a Trace (Lyckliga gatan) (2013), English translation Without a Trace, trans. Neil Smith, 2015
11. The Final Word (Järnblod) (2015), English translation The Final Word, trans. Neil Smith, 2016

Polar Circle trilogy (Stenträsktrilogin):

1. The Arctic Circle, or Polar Circle (Polcirkeln) (2021)

Stand-alones:

- The Postcard Killers (2010), with James Patterson
- The Pearl Farm, or Black Pearl Farm (Pärlfarms) (2019)

=== Short stories ===
- "Vedtjuven" (1999), Annika Bengtzon series

=== Non-fiction ===
- Härifrån till jämställdheten (1998), with Lotta Snickare, feminism
- Det finns en särskild plats i helvetet för kvinnor som inte hjälper varandra (2005), with Lotta Snickare, feminism

== Literary awards ==
- 1998 – Winner of The Swedish Academy of Crime Writers' Award for Best Debut (for The Bomber)
- 1998 – Shortlisted for the Swedish Academy of Crime Writers' Award for Best Swedish Crime Novel of the Year (for The Bomber)
- 1998 – Winner of The Poloni Prize for Best Swedish Crime Novel by a Female Writer (for The Bomber)
- 1999 – Swedish Union's Award for Author of the Year (for Studio 69)
- 1999 – Shortlisted for the Swedish Academy of Crime Writers' Award for Best Swedish Crime Novel of the Year (for Studio 69)
- 1999 – Shortlisted for the Glass Key for Best Nordic Crime Novel of the Year (for The Bomber)
- 2000 – Winner of Paperback of the Year (for The Bomber)
- 2000 – Book of the Year Award (for Vanished)
- 2001 – Winner of QX's Book of the Year Award (for Vanished)
- 2002 – Awarded with the St. Erik's Medal
- 2002 – Winner of the Scanorama Awards (for Scandinavian of the Year in the Literature category)
- 2007 – Winner of The Swedish Literary Award for Best Novel of the Year (for Lifetime)
- 2010 – Winner of The Platinum Paperback Award for Outstanding Paperback Sales (for The Long Shadow)
- 2012 – Awarded with The Reading Relay Gold Medal Scotland (for The Bomber)
- 2012 – Winner of Eurocrime Read of the Year for Favourite read of 2012 (for Last Will)
- 2013 – Winner of The Petrona Award for Best Scandinavian Crime Novel of the Year (for Last Will)
- 2015 – Awarded with the Special Honorary Award by The Swedish Academy of Crime Writers
- 2016 – Winner of Radio Bremen's Crime Award (for The Final Word)
- 2018 – Awarded with Crimetime Specsavers' Honorary Award
- 2019 – Shortlisted for the Storytel Awards for Best Fiction (for The Pearl Farm)
- 2021 – Shortlisted for the Swedish Academy of Crime Writers' Award for Best Crime Novel of the Year (for The Arctic Circle)

== Adaptations ==
- Deadline (2001), film directed by Colin Nutley, based on novel The Bomber
- Paradise (2003), film directed by Colin Nutley, based on novel Paradise
- Nobel's Last Will (2012), film directed by Peter Flinth, based on novel Last Will
- Prime Time (2012), film directed by Agneta Fagerström-Olsson, based on novel Prime Time
- Studio Sex (2012), film directed by Agneta Fagerström-Olsson, based on novel Studio 69
- The Red Wolf (2012), film directed by Agneta Fagerström-Olsson, based on novel The Red Wolf
- Lifetime (2012), film directed by Ulf Kvensler, based on novel Lifetime
- A Place in the Sun (2012), film directed by Peter Flinth, based on novel The Long Shadow
- The Postcard Killings (2020), film directed by Danis Tanović, based on novel The Postcard Killers
