= Jim & Piraterna Blom =

1987 film directed by Hans Alfredson

- Directed by: Hans Alfredson
- Written by: Hans Alfredson; Stellan Skarsgård
- Produced by: Waldemar Bergendahl
- Starring: Johan Åkerblom; Ewa Fröling; Jan Malmsjö
- Cinematography: Ralph M. Evers
- Edited by: Jan Persson
- Music by: Stefan Nilsson
- Release date: February 12, 1987
- Running time: 92 minutes
- Country: Sweden
- Language: Swedish

Jim & Piraterna Blom (Swedish: Jim & Piraterna Blom, lit. 'Jim and the Pirates Blom') is a 1987 Swedish adventure film directed by Hans Alfredson. The main roles are played by Johan Åkerblom, Ewa Fröling, and Jan Malmsjö. The film premiered in Sweden on February 12, 1987, at the cinema Rio in Tomelilla. The film’s title is related to the comic strip ‘’Terry and the Pirates’’, which has also been called ‘‘Jim and the Pirates’’.

== Plot ==
The film is about the 8-year-old boy Jim who lives in Malmö and whose father recently died. But the ghost of his father comes back and begins to visit him. Later, the ghost disappears and Jim begins to fantasize that he is the captain of a pirate ship and out on an adventure with his mother, father and pirate Eskil Blom.

== Cast ==
- Johan Åkerblom as Jim
- Ewa Fröling as Siv, Jim's Mother
- Jan Malmsjö as Ove Bengtsson
- Mats Bergman as Dummer-Jöns
- Stig Olin as Potatis-Algot
- Stellan Skarsgård as Gustav, Jim's Father
- Hans Alfredson as Kolavippen
- Lena T. Hansson as Inez
- Jesper Danielsson
- Sten Hellström
- Carl Billquist
- Mats Ingerdal

== See also ==
- 1987 in film
