= Excursion (film) =

- International release poster
- Bosnian: Ekskurzija
- Directed by: Una Gunjak
- Written by: Una Gunjak
- Produced by: Amra Bakšić Čamo; Adis Đapo
- Starring: Asja Zara Lagumdžija; Nađa Spaho; Maja Izetbegović; Mediha Musliović; Izudin Bajrović; Muhamed Hadžović
- Cinematography: Matthias Pilz
- Edited by: Clémence Diard
- Music by: Draško Adžić
- Production companies: Film House Baš Čelik; Mer Film; Nukleus film SCCA / pro.ba Salaud Morisset
- Release dates: August 4, 2023 (Locarno); August 16, 2023 (Sarajevo)
- Running time: 93 minutes
- Countries: Bosnia and Herzegovina; France; Norway; Croatia; Serbia; Qatar
- Language: Bosnian
- Budget: €511,292

Excursion (Bosnian: Ekskurzija) is a 2023 drama film written and directed by Una Gunjak. Starring Asja Zara Lagumdžija, Nađa Spaho, Maja Izetbegović, Mediha Musliović, Izudin Bajrović and Muhamed Hadžović. It was selected as the Bosnian entry for the Best International Feature Film at the 96th Academy Awards. It is a co-production between Bosnia and Herzegovina, Croatia, Serbia, France, Norway and Qatar.

Excursion had its world premiere at the 76th Locarno Film Festival on August 4, 2023, where it competed for the Golden Leopard – Filmmakers of the Present and was honored with a Special Mention.

== Synopsis ==
Iman, who, as her ninth grade class prepares for a field trip, attracts the attention of an older boy. After a game of truths and dares, a rumor spreads through the school that Iman is pregnant and threatens the field trip, Iman finds herself in a storm of expectations and restrictions, and the events she caused spiral out of control.

== Cast ==
- Asja Zara Lagumdžija as Iman
- Nađa Spaho as Hana
- Maja Izetbegović as Mediha
- Mediha Musliović as Razrednica
- Izudin Bajrović as Dedo
- Muhamed Hadžović as history teacher
- Vedran Tuce as music teacher

== Production ==
Principal photography began on April 22, 2022, and ended on May 29 of the same year in the Canton of Sarajevo, Bosnia and Herzegovina.

== Release ==
Excursion had its world premiere on August 4, 2023, at the 76th Locarno Film Festival, then screened on August 16, 2023, in the out-of-competition section at the 29th Sarajevo Film Festival.

== Reception ==
=== Critical reception ===
Neil Young from Screen Daily wrote: "Excursion is especially strong when it comes to dramatising the social and emotional dynamics between those caught in the tricky middle-ground between girlhood and maturity".

=== Accolades ===
Year	Award / Festival	Category	Recipient	Result	Ref.
2023	Locarno Film Festival	Golden Leopard – Filmmakers of the Present	Excursion	Nominated	
2023	Locarno Film Festival	Special Mention	Excursion	Won	
2023	Adventure Film Festival "Avant & Una"	Unska sirena	Excursion	Won	
2023	Herceg Novi Film Festival - Montenegro Film Festival	Best Screenplay	Excursion	Won	
2023	Herceg Novi Film Festival - Montenegro Film Festival	Best Actress	Excursion	Won	

== See also ==
- List of submissions to the 96th Academy Awards for Best International Feature Film
- List of Bosnian submissions for the Academy Award for Best International Feature Film
