= Not So Friendly Neighborhood Affair =

Film set in Bosnia and Herzegovina

- Theatrical release poster
- Directed by: Danis Tanović
- Written by: Danis Tanović; Nikola Kuprešanin
- Produced by: Mirsad Purivatra; Amra Bakšić Čamo; Jovan Marjanović
- Starring: Branko Đurić; Izudin Bajrović
- Cinematography: Damir Šagolj
- Music by: Brano Jakubović
- Production companies: Obala Art Centar; TRT
- Release date: 13 August 2021
- Running time: 90 minutes
- Countries: Bosnia and Herzegovina
- Language: Bosnian

Not So Friendly Neighborhood Affair (Bosnian: Deset u pola; lit. 'Ten in half') is a 2021 Bosnian comedy film directed by Danis Tanović, who co-wrote the screenplay with Nikola Kuprešanin. The film stars Branko Đurić and Izudin Bajrović.

Released on 13 August 2021, the film received positive reviews.

== Plot ==
In a COVID-19 pandemic-stricken Sarajevo, people walk with masks on their faces, get sick every day and cafes suffer the consequences of a locked world. There is less and less work, and in the May 2021, Baščaršija, Sarajevo's old bazaar, is trying to recover from closed shops. Although the pandemic continues, and the economy is on the wane, Zagreb-based gastro vlogger Gordana (Anja Matković) comes to Baščaršija to eat the best ćevapi (as she says "ćevose"). Enes (Branko Đurić) sends her to Izo (Izudin Bajrović), to make him happy for a moment and treat him to his first morning coffee in a good mood.

However, as the road to Jahannam is paved with good intentions, a friendly gesture causes a collapse of business and private life. Two ćevapi makers are in conflict over the quality of ćevapi in their shops, and their children, who are in a love affair, suffer a conflict between their fathers and have a desire to leave Bosnia and Herzegovina. The disagreements of Enes and Izo cause chaos throughout the city, where not everyone is ready to accept the inevitable changes that come with challenging times.

Because of the influencer's comment, everyone is looking for an answer to the question of where to eat the best ćevapi in Sarajevo, with social networks and other digital platforms creating "hype" among people. Enes negatively impacts his business and he will potentially employ the services of loan sharks.

== Cast ==
- Branko Đurić as Enes
- Izudin Bajrović as Izo
- Edib Ahmetašević as Meho
- Helena Vuković as Lana
- Kerim Čutuna as Orhan
- Anja Matković as Gordana
- Goran Navojec as Cafe Owner
- Vedran Tuce as Para
- Mediha Musliović as wife of Enes
- Ermin Sijamija as Braco
- Mirvad Kurić
- Nermin Tulić
- Halid Bešlić as himself
- Goran Bregović as himself

== Production ==
Filming lasted 21 days and began on 5 May 2021. Danis Tanović was once again collaborating with actors Branko Đurić and Izudin Bajrović, after his films No Man's Land (2001) and Death in Sarajevo (2016). Young actors from the Academy of Performing Arts in Sarajevo, Kerim Čutuna and Helena Vuković, also appear in the film.

== Release ==
The film had its premiere at the Sarajevo Film Festival on 13 August 2021.
