= The Postcard Killers =

Novel by Liza Marklund and James Patterson

- First edition (Swedish)
- Author: Liza Marklund & James Patterson
- Language: Swedish & English
- Genre: Crime fiction
- Publisher: Little, Brown and Company, Piratförlaget
- Publication date: January 2010
- Publication place: United States & Sweden
- English publication date: August 2010
- Media type: print (hardback)
- Pages: 432
- ISBN: 0-316-08951-6

The Postcard Killers (2010) is a crime novel by Swedish writer Liza Marklund and American author James Patterson.

== Plot ==
A young American couple is murdered while vacationing in Europe. The young woman's father, Jacob Kanon, is a New York City police investigator who travels to Europe to hunt down the murderer. Other young couples in France, Germany, Denmark and Sweden have since then been killed and the evidence points in the same direction. Kanon joins up with Scandinavian journalist Dessie Larsson to find the murderer. Kanon and Larsson must work against time since every murder is preceded by a postcard to a regional daily.

== Publication ==
The book was first published in Sweden in January 2010 and the English language edition was published in August the same year. At the end of August, it reached number one on The New York Times Best Seller List, making Liza Marklund the second Swedish author (the first one being Stieg Larsson with the Millennium series) ever to reach the number one spot.

== Conception ==
Patterson had read all of Marklund's books and contacted her asking if the two would write a thriller together. She had not planned to write any novel during 2009 and intended to spend the year studying Spanish. Marklund visited Patterson in his home in Florida where the two discussed ideas and concepts. Patterson later sketched out a foundation synopsis and sent it to her. Marklund went through it, added things she thought were missing and sent it back to Patterson, who in turn added more comments. The creation of this novel included a lot of e-mailing back and forth. Marklund wrote the first draft and Patterson the second draft. Both authors have co-written books in the past, but never across the language barrier. Marklund says she reads English just as fast as Swedish but she wrote in Swedish and then had her drafts translated into English before they were sent to Patterson.

== Film adaptation ==
Patterson told Swedish newspaper Expressen that Hollywood studios had shown an interest in the book. The paper listed Paul Greengrass (The Bourne Supremacy, United 93) and Gavin O'Connor (Miracle) as possible directors. He also speculated that the fact that Marklund hails from the same nation as Stieg Larsson had fuelled the interest.

After several years in development hell, the film adaptation, entitled The Postcard Killings, began production in March 2019, with Danis Tanović directing, and starring Jeffrey Dean Morgan as Jacob Kanon and Cush Jumbo as Dessie Larsson (renamed Dessie Leonard in the film). Originally, Janusz Kamiński was hired to direct, with Patrick Dempsey as Kanon, and Dakota Fanning and later Britt Robertson as Leonard.
