= Danis Tanović =

Bosnian filmmaker (born 1969)

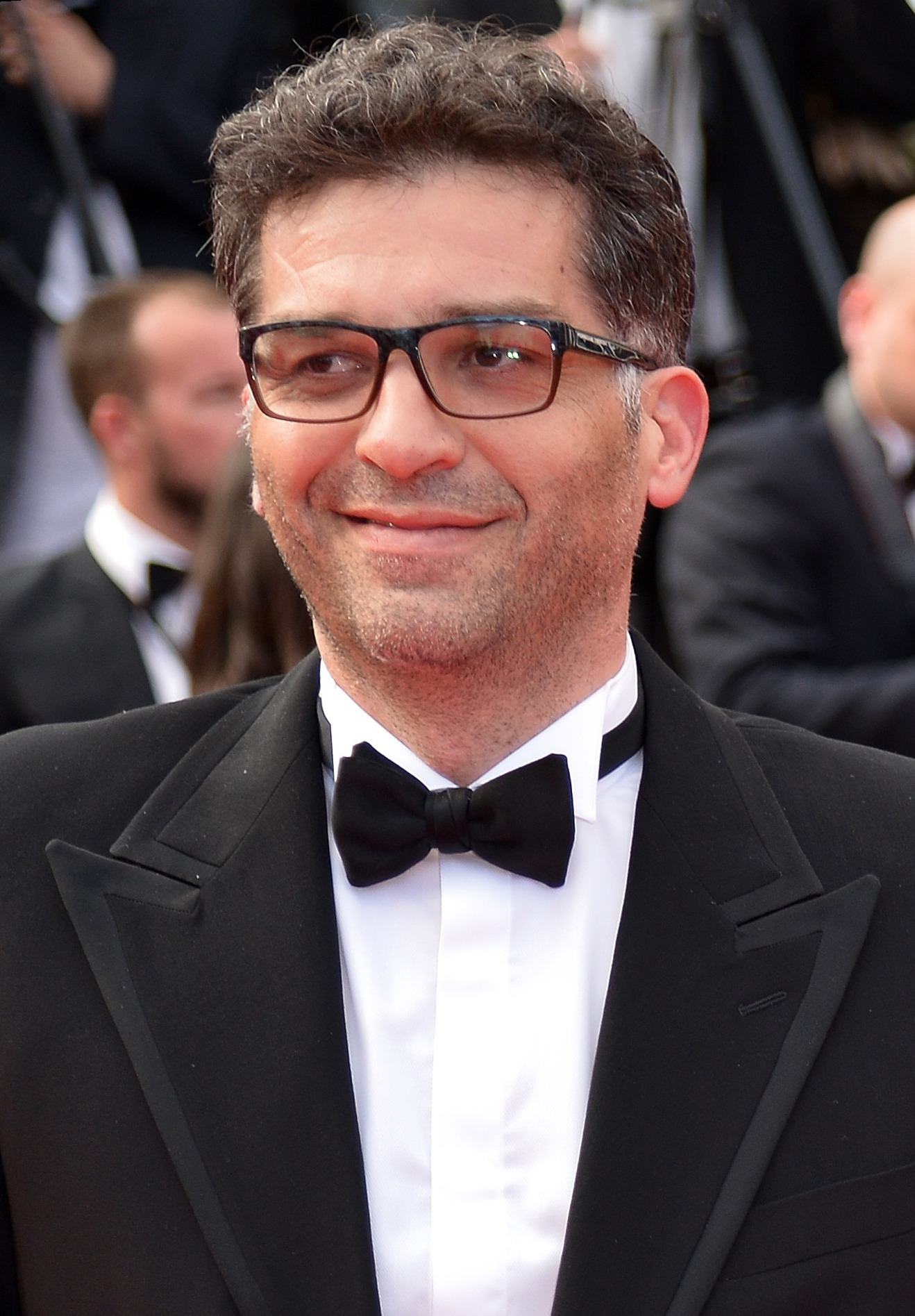
- Tanović in 2014
- Born: 20 February 1969 (age 57); Zenica, SR Bosnia and Herzegovina, Yugoslavia
- Citizenship: Bosnia and Herzegovina; Belgium
- Education: University of Sarajevo
- Occupations: Film director; screenwriter
- Years active: 1994–present
- Political party: Our Party (2008–present)
- Spouse: Maelys de Rudder
- Children: 5

Danis Tanović (Serbo-Croatian Cyrillic: Данис Тановић; born 20 February 1969) is a Bosnian film director and screenwriter. He is the recipient of numerous accolades, including an Academy Award and a Golden Globe Award, as well as nominations for the Golden Bear and the Palme d'Or.

Tanović is known for having directed and written the script for the film No Man's Land (2001), which won him many awards, including an Academy Award and a Golden Globe Award for Best Foreign Language Film. He has also written and directed the award-winning films An Episode in the Life of an Iron Picker (2013) and Death in Sarajevo (2016).

== Early life ==
Tanović was born on 20 February 1969 in Zenica, a city in SR Bosnia and Herzegovina, SFR Yugoslavia. He grew up and received primary and secondary education in Sarajevo.

Tanović attended the University of Sarajevo's Music Academy, where he played the piano. As a young adult, he decided to study at the university's Academy of Performing Arts.

== Career ==
=== Early beginnings ===
Due to the siege of Sarajevo and the Bosnian War, following Bosnia and Herzegovina's declaration of independence from Yugoslavia, Tanović was forced to stop his studies in 1992. Immediately after war broke out, he formed a film crew that followed the Army of the Republic of Bosnia and Herzegovina going on dangerous missions. The material that he and the film crew produced has since been used in numerous films and news reports about the Siege of Sarajevo and the Bosnian War.

In late 1994, Tanović left the film crew he had worked with for over two years. A year later, he decided to resume his studies, this time in Brussels, the capital of Belgium. In 1997, he completed his studies in Brussels, graduating at the top of his class. During his studies, Tanović made several documentary films.

=== International recognition ===
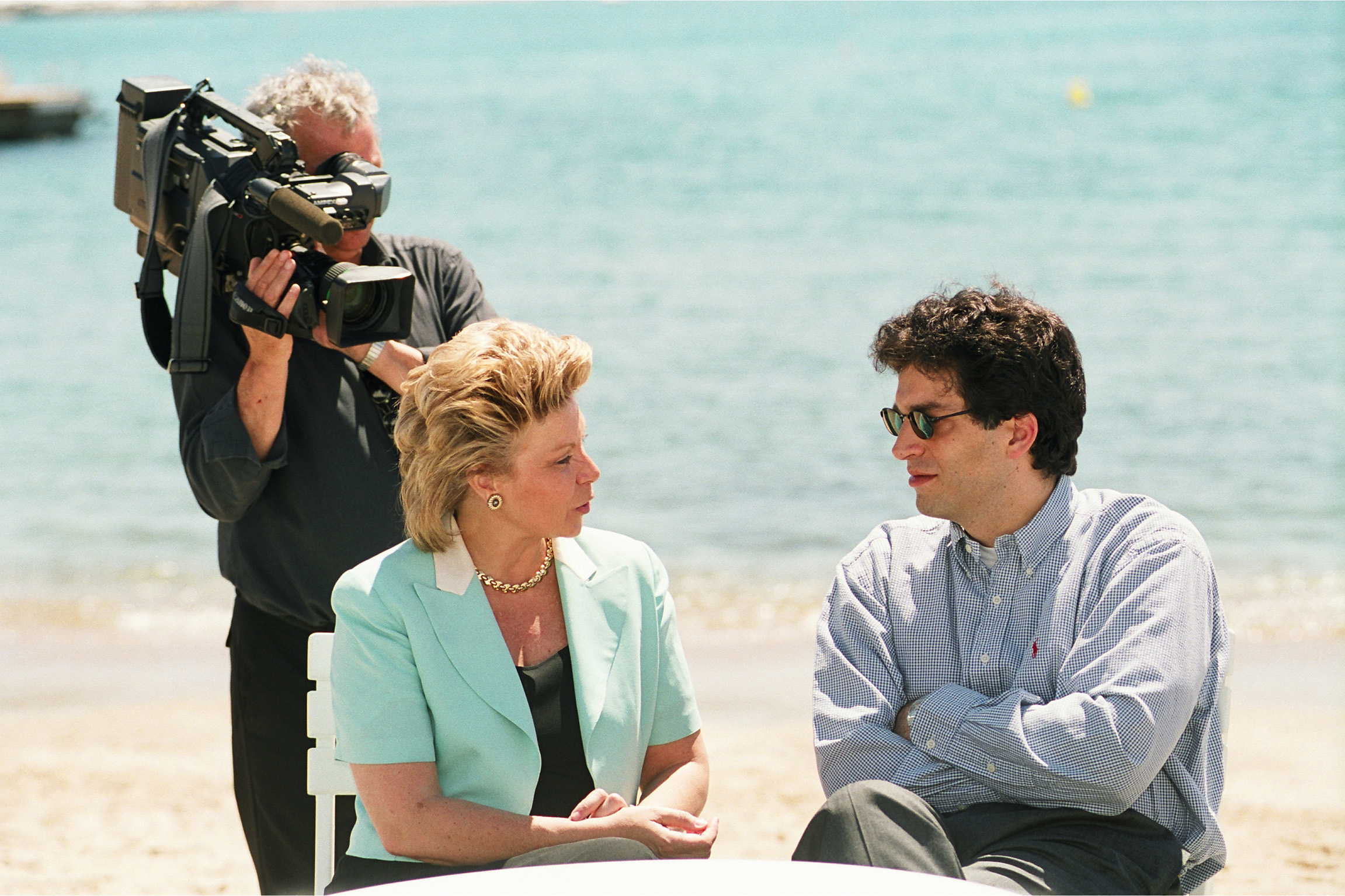
Tanović and Viviane Reding filming for the Cannes Film Festival, 24 May 2002

Shortly after, Tanović began his first movie project, entitled No Man's Land. He wrote and directed the movie, which was completed in 2001 and premiered at the Cannes Film Festival that same year. No Man's Land went on to win the Award for Best Screenplay (Prix du scénario) at Cannes, followed by numerous awards including the Oscar for Best Foreign Language Film in 2001, the European Film Academy Award for Best Screenplay, the César for the Best First Feature Film, the André Cavens Award for Best Film in 2001, and the Golden Globe Award for Best Foreign Language Film in 2002. Tanović was a member of the jury at the 2003 Cannes Film Festival.

His second feature project was L'Enfer, completed in 2005, from the screenplay by the late Krzysztof Kieślowski and Krzysztof Piesiewicz. The film marked the second installment in the Polish duo's projected trilogy Heaven (filmed by Tom Tykwer in 2002), Hell and Purgatory. Inspired by Euripides' Medea, L'Enfer explores the lives of three sisters, "each locked in her own unhappiness, nursing a secret flower of misery, the seed for which was planted by their late father with a terrible incident in their girlhood" (from a review by Peter Bradshaw). The film received mixed reviews.

=== Later projects ===
Tanović's 2010 film Cirkus Columbia was selected as the Bosnian entry for the Best Foreign Language Film at the 83rd Academy Awards, but it did not make the final shortlist. In June 2011, he was bestowed with an "honoris causa" doctorate by the University of Sarajevo.

His 2013 film An Episode in the Life of an Iron Picker premiered in competition at the 63rd Berlin International Film Festival where it won two prizes: Silver Bear for Best Actor and the Jury Grand Prix. Tanović's 2016 film "Death in Sarajevo" won the Jury Grand Prix at the 66th Berlin International Film Festival. It has also won the FIPRESCI Award for the best film in competition.

In March 2020, Tanović's film The Postcard Killings was released, based on the 2010 crime novel "The Postcard Killers". The film Not So Friendly Neighborhood Affair was released in August 2021, receiving positive reviews. His latest film, My Late Summer, premiered at the 30th Sarajevo Film Festival on 16 August 2024.

== Personal life ==
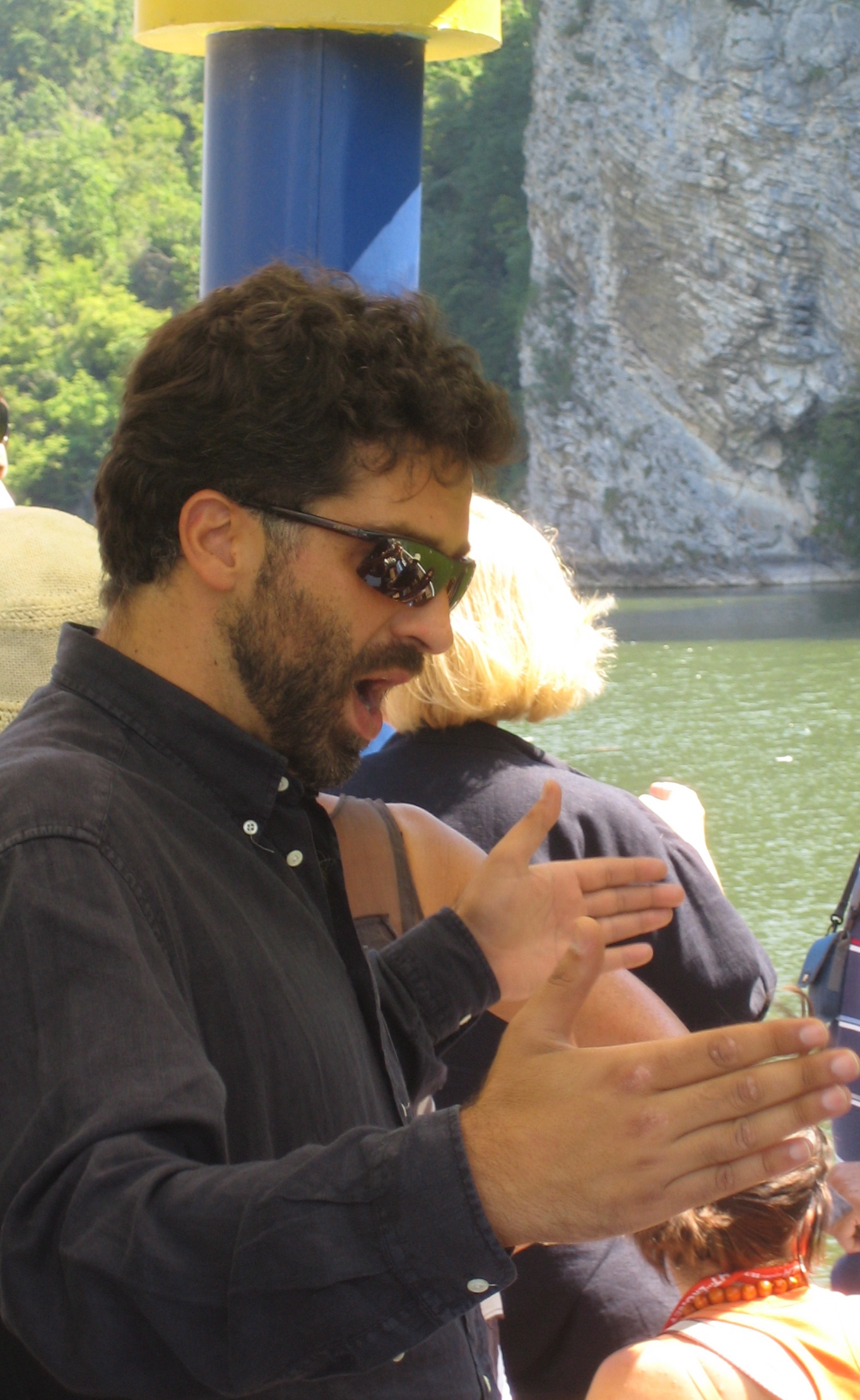
Tanović in 2008

Tanović holds joint Bosnian and Belgian citizenship and lives in Sarajevo with his wife Maelys de Rudder and five children. He lived in Paris until 2007.

=== Political engagement ===
Tanović announced in March 2008 that he would be founding a political party with his friend, director Dino Mustafić, called Our Party, which would start contesting elections with the municipal elections in October 2008. He stated his motivations as wanting to bring political change to the country; his announcement was received positively.

== Filmography ==
Year	Film	Director	Writer	Composer	Screenplay	Rotten Tomatoes	Metacritic
1995	Miracle in Bosnia	Yes	No	No	No		
1996	L'Aube	Yes	No	No	Yes		
1999	Buđenje	Yes	Yes	No	No		
2001	No Man's Land	Yes	Yes	Yes	No	93%	84%
2002	11'09"01 September 11	Yes	Yes	No	No	78%	
2005	Hell	Yes	No	No	No	67%	
2009	Triage	Yes	No	Yes	No		
2010	Cirkus Columbia	Yes	No	No	No	80%	57%
2011	Prtljag	Yes	No	No	No		
2013	An Episode in the Life of an Iron Picker	Yes	Yes	No	No	93%	
2014	Tigers	Yes	Yes	No	Yes		
2016	Death in Sarajevo	Yes	Yes	No	Yes	76%	
2020	The Postcard Killings	Yes	No	No	No	25%	29%
2021	Not So Friendly Neighborhood Affair	Yes	Yes	No	No		
2024	My Late Summer	Yes	Yes	No	No		

=== Television ===
Year	Television show	Episode/s	Director	Writer	Producer
2022–2025	Kotlina	13 episodes	Yes	Yes	Yes

== Awards and nominations ==
Year	Association	Category	Work	Result	Ref.
2001	Cannes Film Festival	Palme d'Or	No Man's Land	Nominated	
2001	Cannes Film Festival	Best Screenplay	No Man's Land	Won	
2001	European Film Awards	Best Screenwriter	No Man's Land	Won	
2001	Belgian Film Critics Association	André Cavens Award	No Man's Land	Won	
2002	Academy Award	Best Foreign Language Film	No Man's Land	Won	
2002	Golden Globe Awards	Best Foreign Language Film	No Man's Land	Won	
2002	César Awards	Best Original Screenplay or Adaptation	No Man's Land	Nominated	
2002	European Film Academy	Best Screenplay	No Man's Land	Won	
2003	Cinema for Peace	The Cinema for Peace Award for the Most Valuable Film of the Year	No Man's Land	Won	
2013	Berlin International Film Festival	Golden Bear	An Episode in the Life of an Iron Picker	Nominated	
2013	Berlin International Film Festival	Jury Grand Prix	An Episode in the Life of an Iron Picker	Won	
2016	Berlin International Film Festival	Golden Bear	Death in Sarajevo	Nominated	
2016	Berlin International Film Festival	Jury Grand Prix	Death in Sarajevo	Won	
