= Spendrups =

Swedish brewery

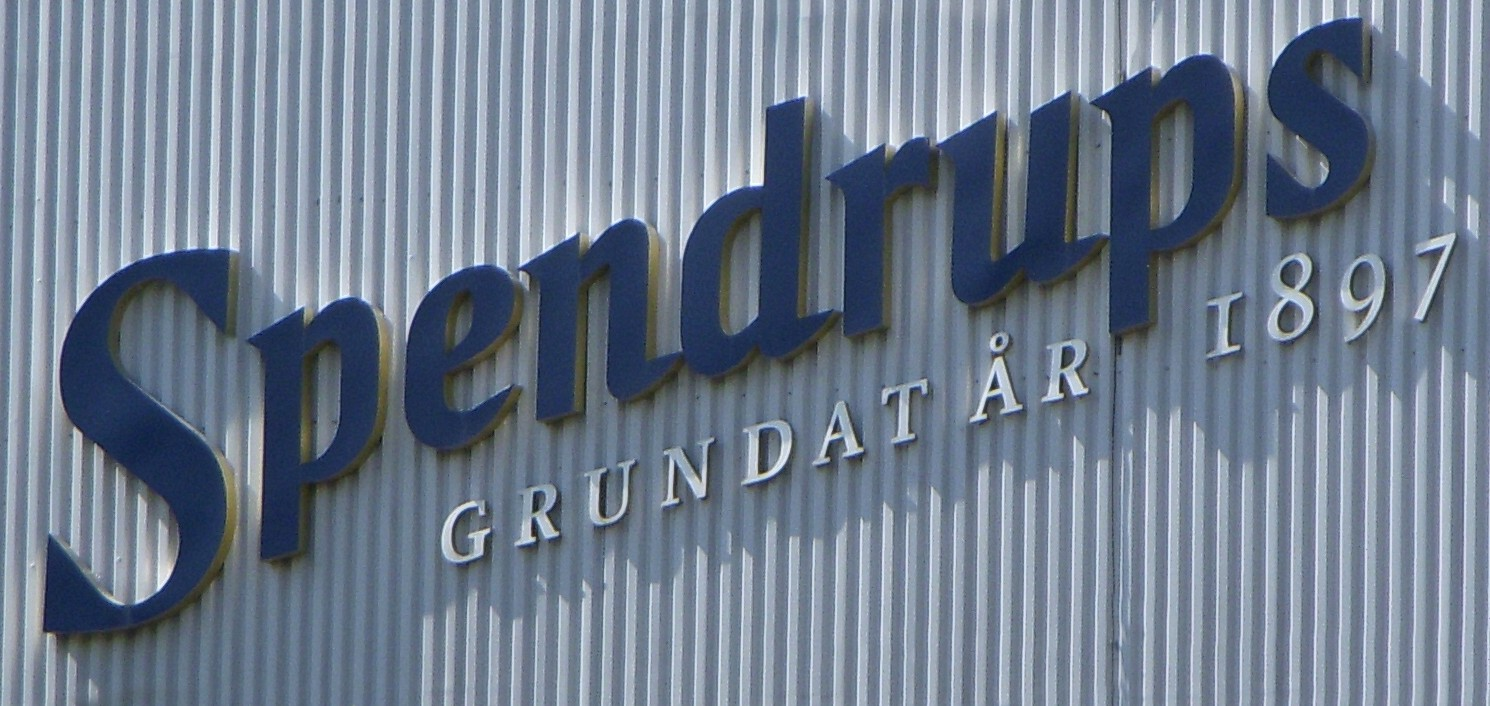

Spendrups Bryggeri AB is a Swedish brewery known as Grängesbergs Bryggeri AB until 1983. The company includes the subsidiaries Spring Wine & Spirits, Gotlands Bryggeri and Hellefors Bryggeri. Spendrups Group has approximately 900 employees and sales revenue of approximately 3 billion Swedish kronor.

The head office is located in Stockholm, and the company runs four breweries, in Grängesberg, Hällefors, Visby (the micro brewery Gotlands Bryggeri AB), and Stockholm (the micro brewery OMAKA).

Spendrups is Sweden's largest brewery.

== History ==
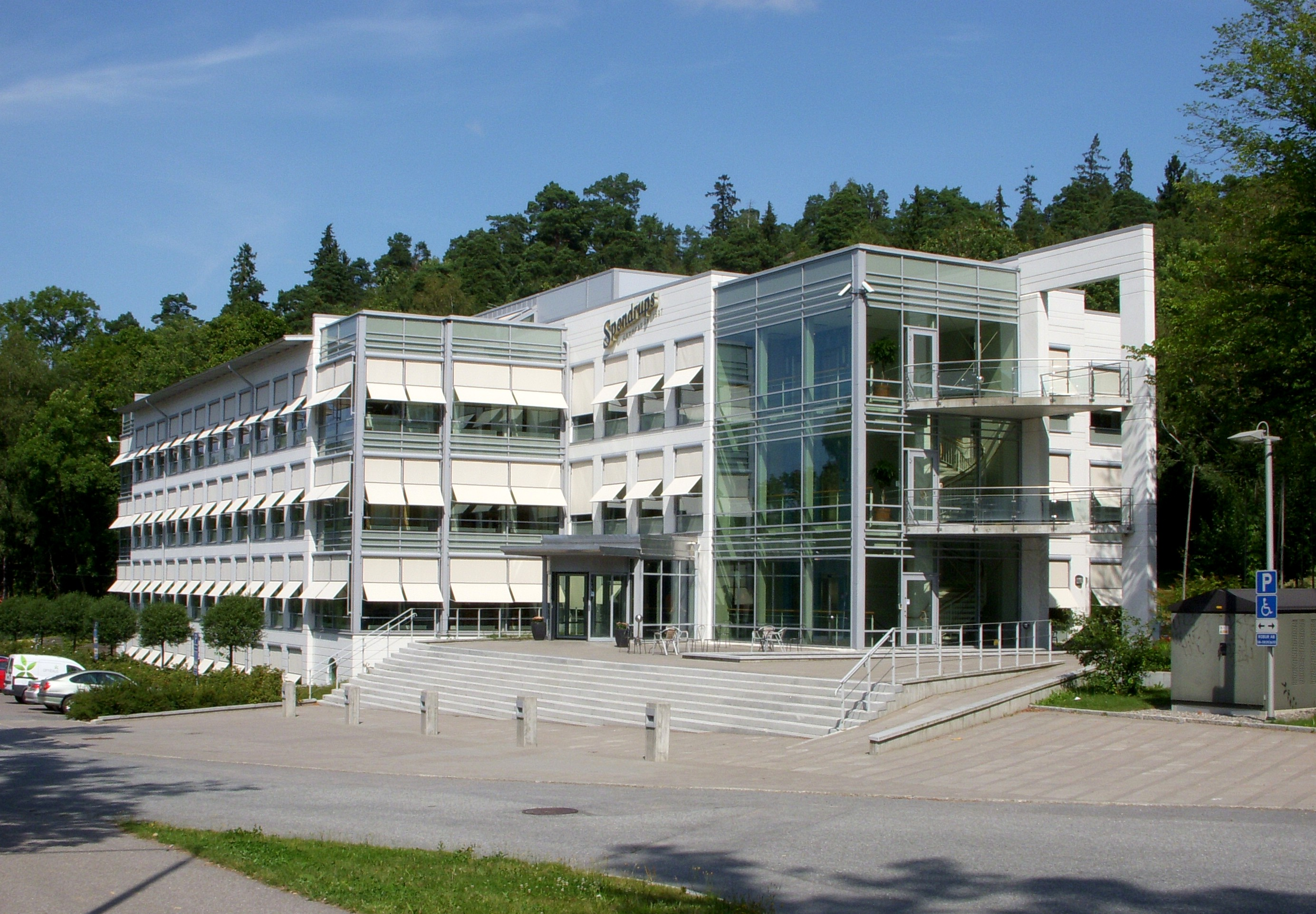
Spendrups head office in Huddinge

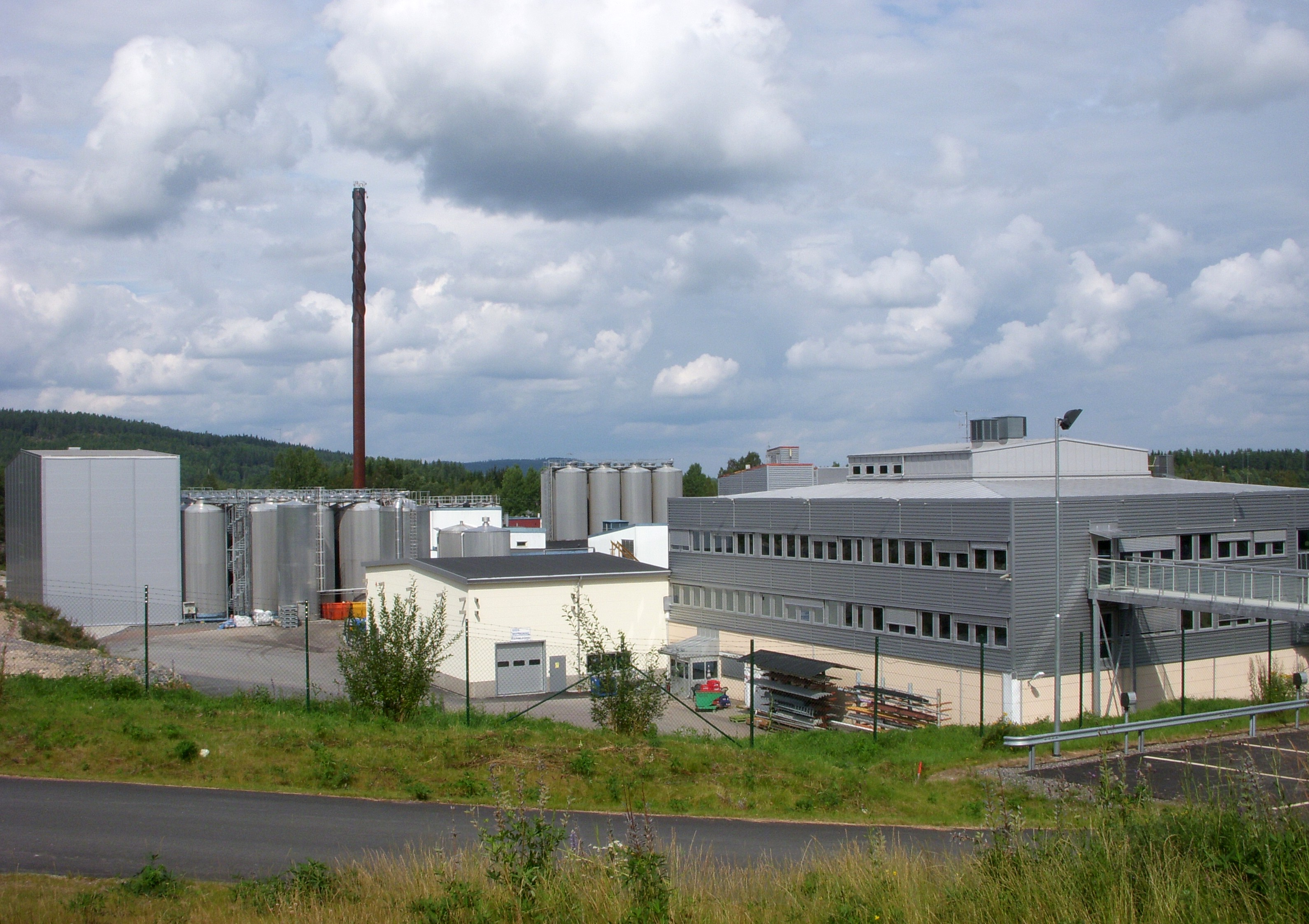
Spendrups brewery in Grängesberg

Video, Spendrups brewery in Huddinge (closed in 2013)

In 1923, the Danish brewer Louis Spendrup acquired Grängesbergs Bryggeri in Dalecarlia. His son Jens Fredrik Spendrup took over the company in 1950. In 1967, Mariestads Bryggeri, a large brewery in Mariestad, was acquired. Jens and Ulf Spendrup, the sons of Jens Fredrik Spendrup, became chief executives of Grängesbergs Bryggeri in 1976.

The brewery launched a beer called "Spendrups" at Operakällaren in Stockholm in 1979. In 1982, Grängesbergs Bryggeri AB changed its name to Spendrups Bryggeri AB, and the brewery was listed on the stock exchange in 1983. The company withdrew from the stock market in 2001.

In 1989, Spendrups purchased Kooperativa Förbundets brewing operations consisting of Wårby Bryggerier located on the outskirts of Stockholm and Sollefteå Bryggeri (presently Zeunerts brewery). Among others, the brand Norrlands Guld was included in the purchase. The brewery in Sollefteå, where Norrlands Guld was originally brewed was shut down and sold, whereas Vårby brewery was retained.

The abolishment of the state wine and liquor monopoly occurred in 1995, as a result of Sweden's entry into the European Union (EU), thus allowing Spendrups to import and distribute wine. In 2001, the company started liquor distribution, as well as licensed production of Heineken. In 2009, Spendrups included the brand Schweppes in its product portfolio.

Henrik Åström has been CEO since September 2024. He succeeded Fredrik Spendrup.

== Sales ==
In 2015, Spendrups was Systembolaget's second largest supplier of beer, with 21.6% of deliveries (50,612,575 liters). During the same year Spendrups delivered 859,488 liters of cider and RTD’s ('Ready to drink') and 410,598 liters of non-alcoholic beverages to Systembolaget, making the company's total market share 12,5%. With regards to the restaurant market, there are no official figures.

== Brands ==
Spendrups' own brands include Spendrups, Norrlands Guld, Mariestads, Loka and Nygårda. Brands manufactured under license include Heineken, Schweppes, El Coto and Cono Sur.
