= Deadline (2001 film) =

2001 Swedish thriller directed by Colin Nutley

- Directed by: Colin Nutley
- Written by: Liza Marklund (novel); Colin Nutley (screenplay); Anna Fredriksson (screenplay); Johanna Hald (screenplay)
- Produced by: Maritha Norstedt
- Starring: Helena Bergström; Niklas Hjulström; Örjan Ramberg; Reine Brynolfsson; Pernilla August
- Release date: 24 October 2001
- Running time: 128 minutes
- Country: Sweden
- Language: Swedish

Deadline is a 2001 Swedish thriller. It was released in the US as The Bomber which is a direct translation of its original Swedish title Sprängaren which is the same as the novel by Liza Marklund from which it was adapted. It stars Helena Bergström, Örjan Ramberg, Ewa Fröling and Pernilla August amongst others. The film was directed by Colin Nutley, who is also married to the lead actress Helena Bergström.

== Plot ==
Annika Bengtzon, an up-and-coming young reporter for Kvällspressens newspaper, is called to the scene of a possible terrorist attack on the new Olympic Arena, Victoria Stadium in Stockholm, where the northern part of the arena has been blown to pieces. The blast kills Christina Furhage, the Swedish Olympic ambassador, and Bengtzon soon finds out that the bombing may have been a personal attack against Furhage and not a terrorist attack. Soon more Olympic Arenas around Stockholm are attacked and there are more victims, just months away from the Summer Olympics. A bomber with a personal agenda is on the loose.

== About ==
The script of the film is based on the book The Bomber (Swedish: Sprängaren) by Swedish author Liza Marklund. The script for the film was written by Anna Fredriksson, Johanna Hald and Colin Nutley.

== Cast ==
- Helena Bergström - Annika Bengtzon
- Niklas Hjulström - Thomas Samuelsson
- Örjan Ramberg - Anders Schyman
- Reine Brynolfsson - Spiken
- Brasse Brännström - Nils Langeby
- Ewa Fröling - Berit
- Pernilla August - Beata Ekesjö
- Tomas Pontén - Evert Danielsson
- Maria Lundqvist - Eva-Britt Qvist
- Tilde Fröling
