= Norrlands Guld =

Beer brand

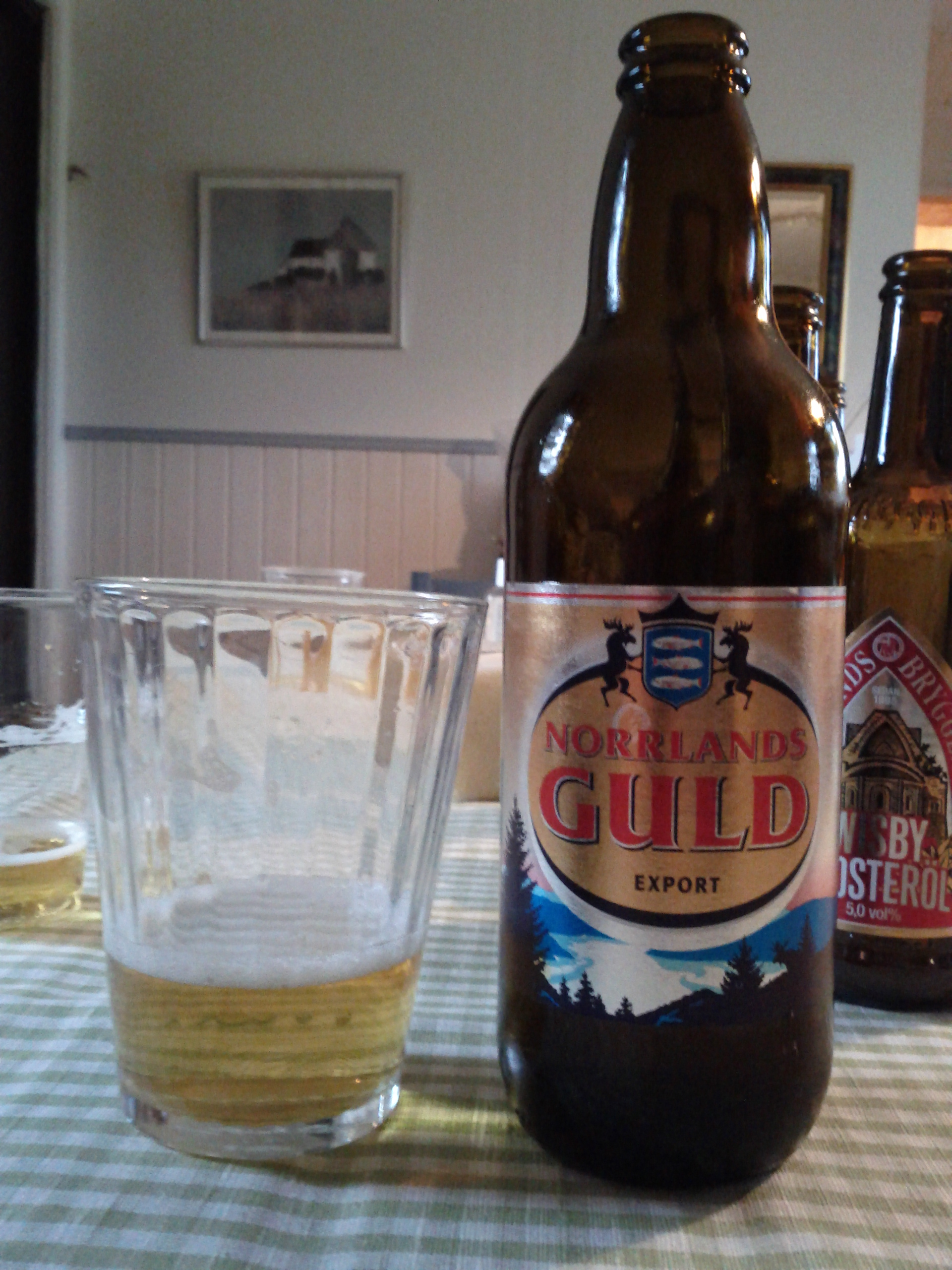

Norrlands Guld (Gold of Norrland) is a lager beer introduced in 1965 by Sollefteå Bryggeri. It is now brewed by Spendrups as of 1989.

It is known for its long-running ad campaign which features a stereotyped view of Norrland. The principal character is Ingemar, a very laid back man who lives a simple life with friends.

The central message is that people from Norrland (who naturally drink Norrlands Guld) are generally more laid back and free from pretension. The Catchphrase "Varför inte vara dig själv för en stund?" (Why not be yourself for a moment?) reflects this.

Norrlands Guld is also sold outside of Sweden throughout the IKEA retail chain.

== Norrlands Guld the movie ==
In 2006, ads started to appear for an upcoming movie called Snart är det lördag igen (soon it's Saturday again) which was being directed by comedian Henrik Schyffert. It was to star Pontus Gårdinger as Ingemar and was presented as a dramatic revenge story with a completely different tone than the previous commercials.

This was actually just a joke and no movie was in the works. It did however spawn a 30-minute mockumentary video where Schyffert and others involved talk about how everything went wrong with the shoot.
