= The Bomber =

1998 novel by Liza Marklund

The Bomber (Swedish: Sprängaren) is a crime novel by Liza Marklund about her heroine Annika Bengtzon. It was first published in 1998. It was adapted into a 2001 film titled Deadline.

== Adaptations ==
- Deadline (2001), film directed by Colin Nutley
