= Peter Siepen =

Swedish television presenter

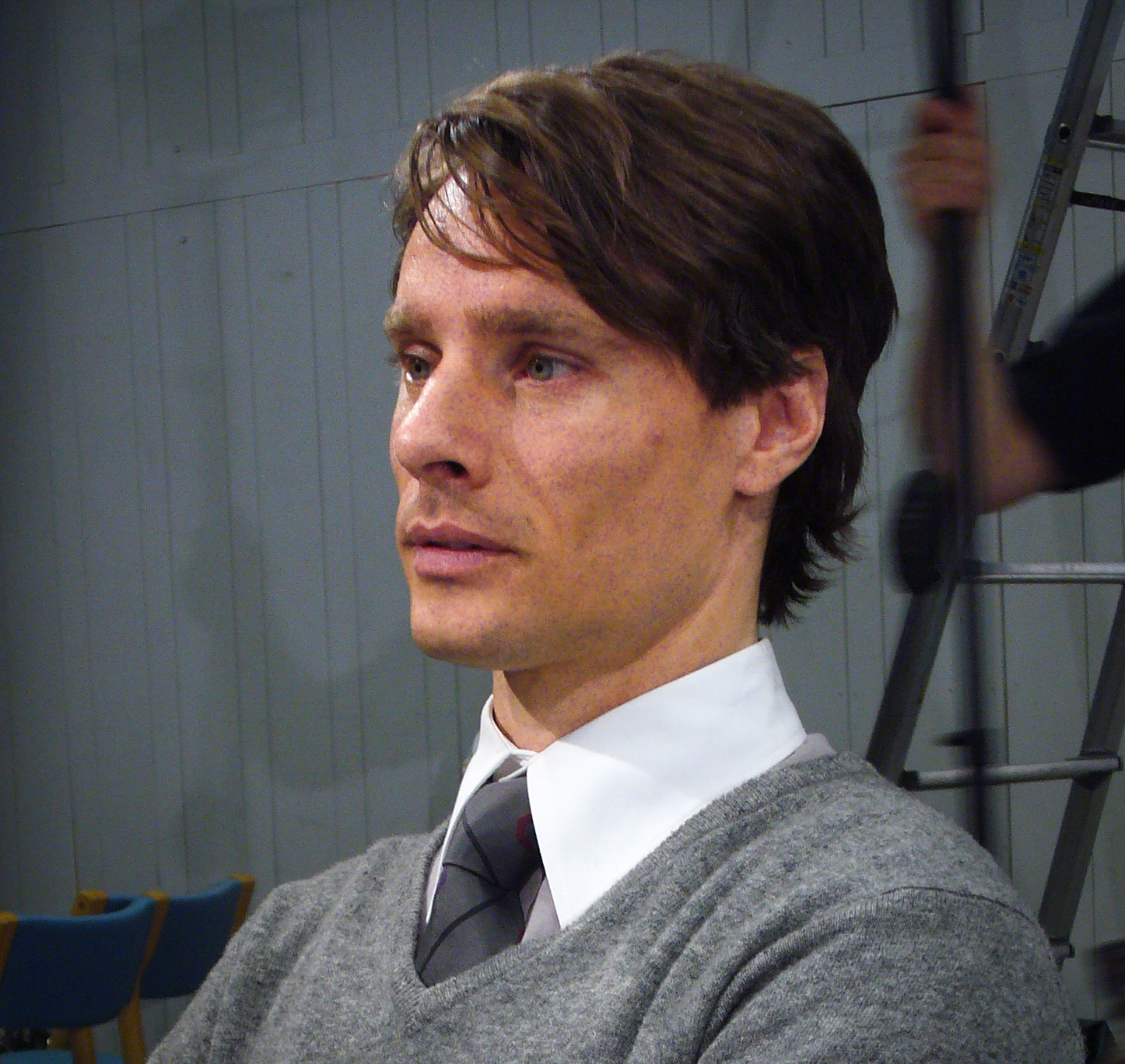
Peter Siepen

Peter Siepen (born 28 December 1962 in Stockholm) is a Swedish television presenter. He started work as a bus driver and his first television presenter job was for the Kanal 5 show Palladium top 10. He has since presented several shows at Kanal 5, ZTV, SVT, TV4 Plus, TV4 and TV6.
