= Nobel's Last Will =

2012 film

- Film poster
- Swedish: Nobels testamente
- Directed by: Peter Flinth
- Starring: Malin Crépin; Björn Kjellman
- Release date: 2 March 2012
- Running time: 90 minutes
- Country: Sweden
- Language: Swedish

Nobel's Last Will (Swedish: Nobels testamente) is a 2012 Swedish drama film directed by Peter Flinth.

== Cast ==
- Malin Crépin as Annika Bengtzon
- Björn Kjellman as Anders Schyman
- Leif Andrée as Spiken
- Kajsa Ernst as Berit Hamrin
- Erik Johansson as Patrik Nilsson
- Felix Engström as Q
- Richard Ulfsäter as Thomas Samuelsson
- Antje Traue as Kitten
- Per Graffman as Bernhard Thorell
- Björn Granath as Ernst Ericsson
- Maria Langhammer as Birgitta Larsén
