= List of ambassadors of Bosnia and Herzegovina to the United States =

Ambassador of Bosnia and Herzegovina to the United States
- Ambasador Bosne i Hercegovine u Sjedinjenim Državama; Амбасадор Босне и Херцеговине у Сједињеним Државама
- Coat of arms of Bosnia and Herzegovina

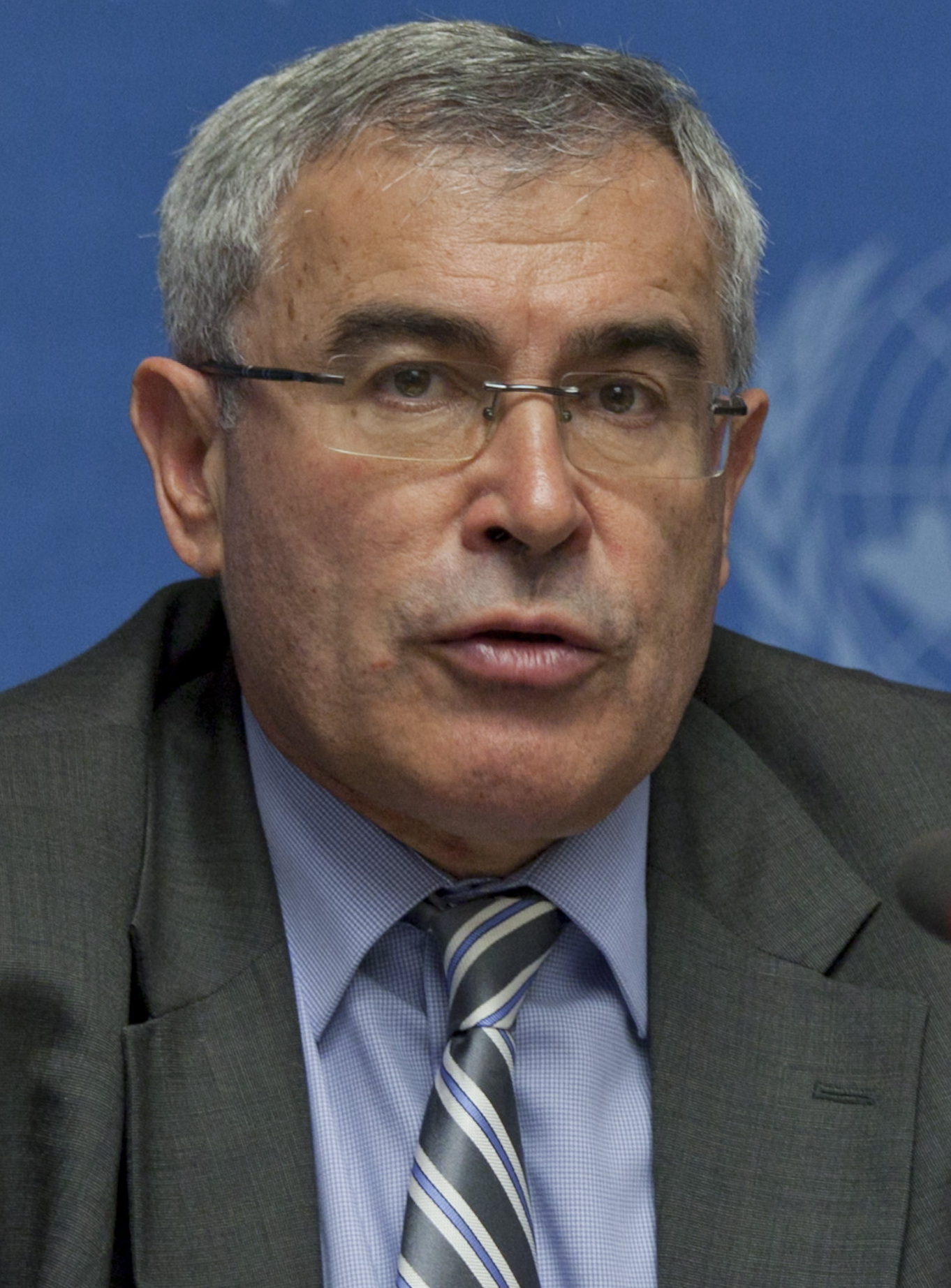
- Incumbent; Sven Alkalaj since June 30, 2023
- Seat: Washington, D.C., U.S.
- Appointer: Presidency
- Term length: No fixed term
- Inaugural holder: Sven Alkalaj
- Formation: June 23, 1994
- Website: www.bhembassy.org

This is a list of people who have served as ambassador of Bosnia and Herzegovina to the United States. The ambassador of Bosnia and Herzegovina is the official representative of the Bosnian government in Sarajevo to the government of the United States.

== History ==
The first ambassador was Sven Alkalaj, designated on April 5 and appointed on June 23, 1994, and served as ambassador until June 14, 2000. He would later on become a prominent diplomat, serve as Bosnia and Herzegovina's Minister of Foreign Affairs and as the country's Permanent Representative to the United Nations.

The first women as ambassador was Bisera Turković, designated on August 10 and appointed on October 3, 2005, serving until May 20, 2009. She also served as Minister of Foreign Affairs from 2019 to 2023.

The current ambassador is Sven Alkalaj, appointed on June 30, 2023.

== List ==
Ambassador extraordinary and plenipotentiary	Appointed	Presentation of credentials
Sven Alkalaj	April 5, 1994	June 23, 1994
Igor Davidović	February 10, 2000	June 14, 2000
Bisera Turković	August 10, 2005	October 3, 2005
Mitar Kujundžić	February 27, 2009	May 20, 2009
Jadranka Negodić	July 19, 2012	July 30, 2012
Haris Hrle	September 4, 2015	February 2, 2016
Bojan Vujić	April 18, 2019	September 16, 2019
Sven Alkalaj	March 20, 2023	June 30, 2023

== See also ==
- Bosnia and Herzegovina–United States relations
- List of ambassadors of the United States to Bosnia and Herzegovina
