= Ivan Barbalić =

Bosnian diplomat (born 1975)

Ivan Barbalić (born 1975) is a Bosnian diplomat who has served as Ambassador to the Russian Federation, and also served as the Permanent Representative of Bosnia and Herzegovina to the United Nations and was accredited as the Ambassador Extraordinary and Plenipotentiary and Chief of the Permanent Mission of Bosnia and Herzegovina to the Office of the United Nations. He was appointed by the Presidency of Bosnia and Herzegovina.

== Biography ==
Ivan Barbalić graduated from the University of Bridgeport, Connecticut School of Business. Prior to earning his business degree, he received in 2001 a European regional Master of Science in Democracy and Human Rights in South-East Europe from the University of Sarajevo and the University of Bologna.

In 2012, he was granted a Doctor of Humane Letters honoris causa degree from the University of Bridgeport.

He has served as a lecturer at the International League of Humanists, a group founded to promote peace in Southeast Europe. He has been a member of the UN Development Programme’s Early Warning System in Bosnia and Herzegovina.

From 2005 to 2007, he served on his country’s negotiation team for the Stabilization and Association Agreement with the European Union, after earlier working at its Directorate for European Integration from 2000 to 2001.

He also was a vice president of a non-governmental organization known the European Movement in Bosnia and Herzegovina NGO, a position he has held since 2006.

Barbalić was born in 1975 in Sarajevo, as the last generation of born in Koševo, a suburb of Sarajevo. He is the son of Nikola Barbalić, former University Professor of mechanical engineering, and excelling volleyball athlete.

Ivan is a nephew of Mr Željko Jerkić, former Deputy Minister of Foreign Affairs of Bosnia and Herzegovina and a grandson of Ivo Jerkić.

Barbalić was the President of the United Nations Security Council in January 2011. Barbalić was succeeded by Ms. Mirsada Čolaković on 6 July 2012. After the United Nation, in 2013, he was appointed as Ambassador of Bosnia and Herzegovina to the Russian Federation.

Diplomatic posts
Preceded by Miloš Prica	Permanent Representative of Bosnia and Herzegovina to the United Nations; 2009–2012	Succeeded by Mirsada Čolaković
