= Željko Jerkić =

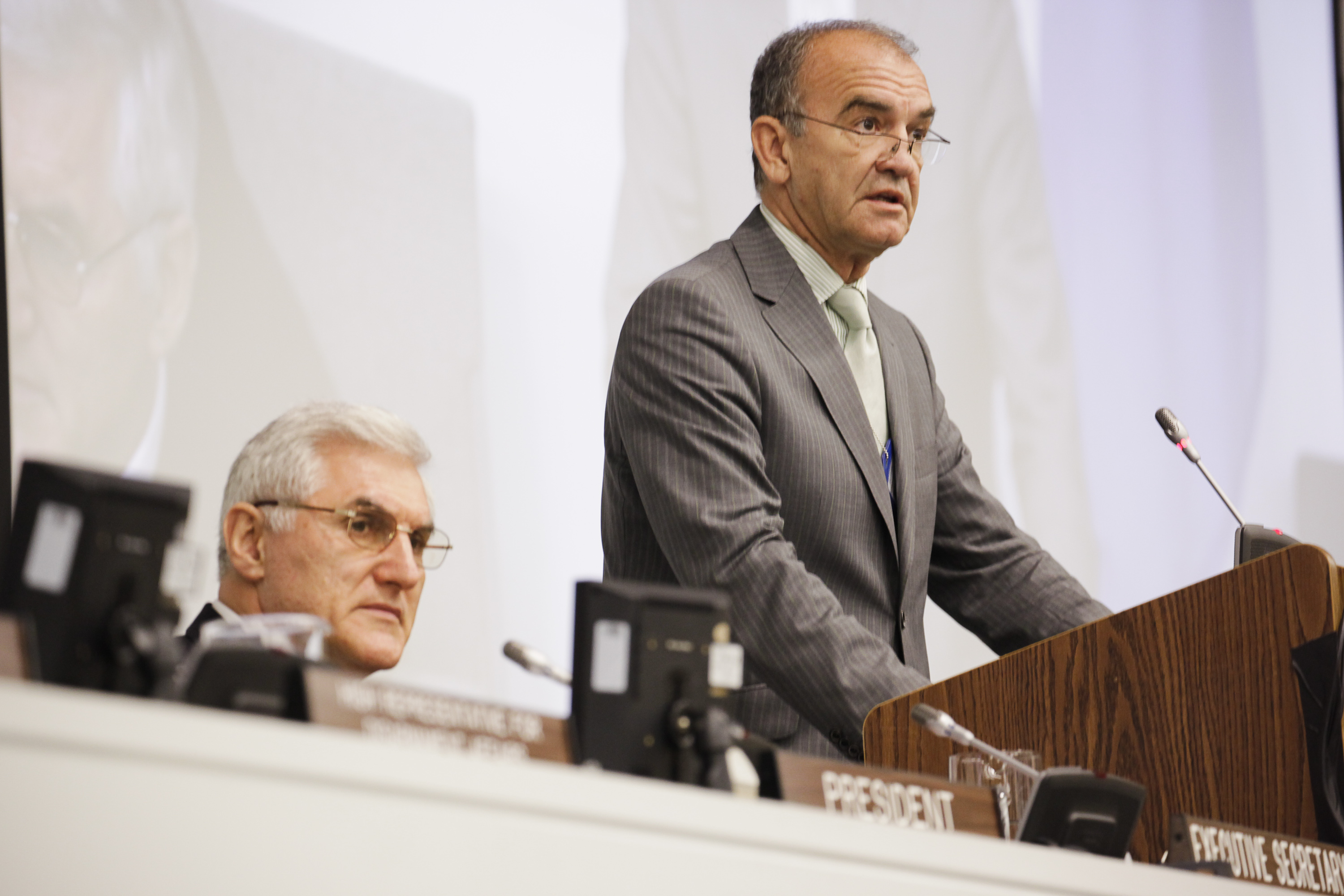
Jerkić (speaking), at the Conference on Facilitating the Entry into Force of the Comprehensive Nuclear-Test-Ban Treaty, New York, 23 September 2011.

Željko Jerkić is a Bosnian diplomat who holds a diplomatic rank of an ambassador in the Ministry of Foreign Affairs of Bosnia and Herzegovina. He is also a Department Head of the Department for Peace and Security of the before mentioned Ministry. He was also a Deputy Minister of Foreign Affairs of Bosnia and Herzegovina.

== Personal life ==
Jerkić was born in Sarajevo, Bosnia and Herzegovina to a Croat family. His father, Ivo Jerkić, was an official of the Socialist Republic of Bosnia and Herzegovina (within Socialist Federal Republic of Yugoslavia). He is the uncle of Ivan Barbalić, a Permanent Representative of Bosnia and Herzegovina at the United Nations Organization.

Jerkić also held positions of a Permanent Delegate of Bosnia and Herzegovina at the United Nations Educational, Scientific and Cultural Organization and of the chargé d'affaires a.i. and latter Ambassador of Bosnia and Herzegovina to the Kingdom of the Netherlands.

From 2005 to 2010, he also worked as an advisor for the Organisation for the Prohibition of Chemical Weapons (the Hague).

== Diplomatic career ==
Jerkić started his diplomatic career in 1983 as an attaché in the Permanent Mission of SFR Yugoslavia at the United Nations Office at Geneva (Switzerland). In 1989, he was an advisor of the Permanent Representative of Yugoslavia at the United Nations Organization. He was the Head of the Delegation of Bosnia and Herzegovina at the 16th Summit of the Non-Aligned Movement. Jerkić was also a participant at numerous conferences, for instance in the International Commission for the Protection of the Danube River.
