= Prica =

Prica is a Serbo-Croatian surname. Notable people with the surname include:

- Alma Prica (born 1962), Croatian actress
- Dragutin Prica (1867–1960) Yugoslav admiral
- Miloš Prica, Bosnian diplomat
- Ognjen Prica (1899–1941), Yugoslav politician
- Rade Prica (born 1980), Swedish footballer
- Tim Prica (born 2002), Swedish footballer
