= Miloš Vukašinović =

Politician from Bosnia and Herzegovina

Miloš Vukašinović is a Serb diplomat from Bosnia and Herzegovina, having held several prominent positions in the country's Ministry of Foreign Affairs. From 2015 to 2018, he was the Permanent Representative of Bosnia and Herzegovina to the United Nations.

== Biography ==
He worked as a legal consultant for a company during the 1980s before becoming district court judge in east Sarajevo from 1992 until 1996. Vukašinović then worked as an adviser to the justice ministry of the Government of Republika Srpska to 1997, when he became chief of the cabinet of the Deputy Foreign Minister. In 1998, he became the head of the Peace and Security Division of the Bosnian Ministry of Foreign Affairs, and was appointed assistant foreign minister for bilateral relations in 2000. Vukašinović was later appointed to serve as the permanent representative of Bosnia and Herzegovina in the UN office in Geneva, holding the post until 2005.

Vukašinović was the head councilor of the Bosnian mission to the European Union and the head of the Division for North and South America, Australia, and Oceania until 2009. He then served as the deputy permanent representative to the UN until 2012, when he became the head councilor in the division for the United Nations and International Organizations of the foreign ministry. He presented his credentials to Secretary-General Ban Ki-moon in August 2015 when he was appointed Permanent Representative of Bosnia and Herzegovina to the United Nations. Later that year, in November he helped establish relations between his country and Sierra Leone, signing a joint declaration on the establishment of diplomatic relations at the Bosnian permanent mission in New York City.

Diplomatic posts
Preceded by Mirsada Čolaković	Permanent Representative of Bosnia and Herzegovina to the United Nations; 2015–2018	Succeeded by Ivica Dronjić
