= Ivica Dronjić =

Bosnian diplomat

Permanent Representative of Bosnia and Herzegovina to the United Nations
- In office 31 August 2018 – 5 July 2019
- Preceded by: Miloš Vukašinović
- Succeeded by: Sven Alkalaj

Ivica Dronjić is a Bosnian diplomat who served as the Permanent Representative of Bosnia and Herzegovina to the United Nations from 2018 to 2019.

== Career ==
Dronjić's diplomatic career began in 1986 and rose through the ranks to office of Minister Counsellor and later Deputy Permanent Representative of Bosnia and Herzegovina to the United Nations (UN) missions in Vienna, Geneva and New York, before being promoted to the head of the UN Department and other international organisations in the Ministry of Foreign Affairs.

He was appointed Permanent Representative of Bosnia and Herzegovina to the United Nations in 2018, but had a short tenure as he was recalled by his country's Presidency members Željko Komšić and Milorad Dodik. After his removal from the UN, Dronjić complained that he had the shortest tenure as a permanent representative to the UN in a letter to the UN Secretary-General António Guterres.

Diplomatic posts
Preceded by Miloš Vukašinović	Permanent Representative of Bosnia and Herzegovina to the United Nations; 2018–2019	Succeeded by Sven Alkalaj
