= Permanent Representative of Bosnia and Herzegovina to the United Nations =

- Stalni predstavnik Bosne i Hercegovine pri Ujedinjenim nacijama Стални представник Босне и Херцеговине при Уједињеним нацијама
- Coat of arms of Bosnia and Herzegovina

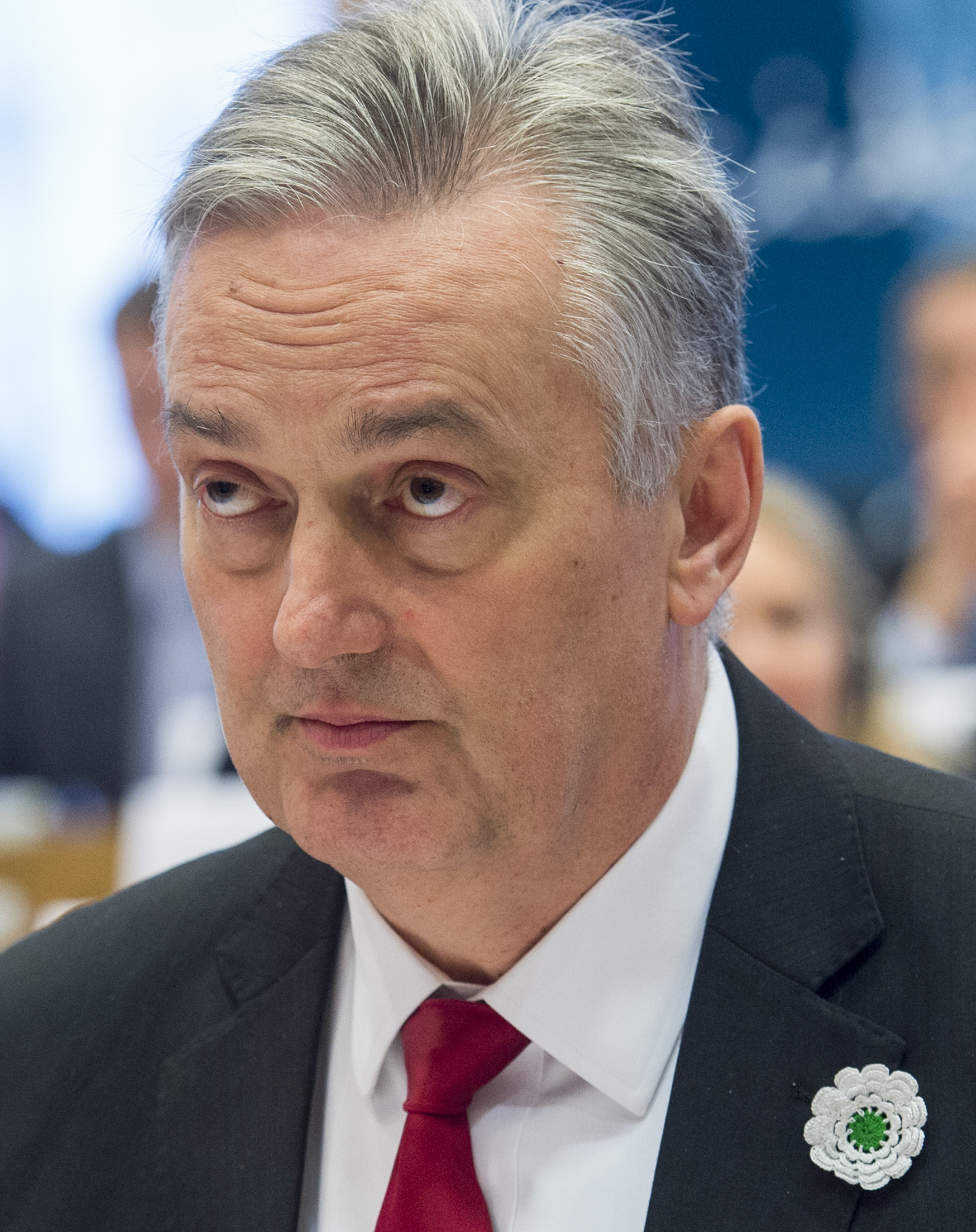
- Incumbent; Zlatko Lagumdžija since 6 July 2023
- Seat: New York City, U.S.
- Appointer: Presidency
- Term length: No fixed term
- Formation: 22 May 1992; 34 years ago
- First holder: Muhamed Sacirbey
- Website: bhmissionun.org

The permanent representative of Bosnia and Herzegovina to the United Nations is Bosnia and Herzegovina's foremost diplomatic representative to the United Nations. The position of permanent representative holds the equivalent rank to that of an ambassador and is appointed by the Presidency of Bosnia and Herzegovina.

The position of the permanent representative of Bosnia and Herzegovina to the United Nations is the highest position among all the ambassadors of Bosnia and Herzegovina. The current permanent representative is Zlatko Lagumdžija, having served since 6 July 2023.

== List of permanent representatives ==
The following is a chronological list of those who have held the office:

Incumbent	Term start	Term end	Ref.
Muhamed Šaćirbegović	22 May 1992	31 December 2000	
Mirza Kušljugić	1 January 2001	8 September 2005	
Miloš Prica	8 September 2005	8 January 2009	
Ivan Barbalić	8 January 2009	6 July 2012	
Mirsada Čolaković	6 July 2012	14 August 2015	
Miloš Vukašinović	14 August 2015	31 August 2018	
Ivica Dronjić	31 August 2018	5 July 2019	
Sven Alkalaj	5 July 2019	30 June 2023	
Zlatko Lagumdžija	6 July 2023	Incumbent	

== See also ==
- Foreign relations of Bosnia and Herzegovina
- United Nations Mission in Bosnia and Herzegovina
- Bosnia and Herzegovina–United States relations
