= Jadranko Prlić =

Bosnian Croat politician (born 1959)

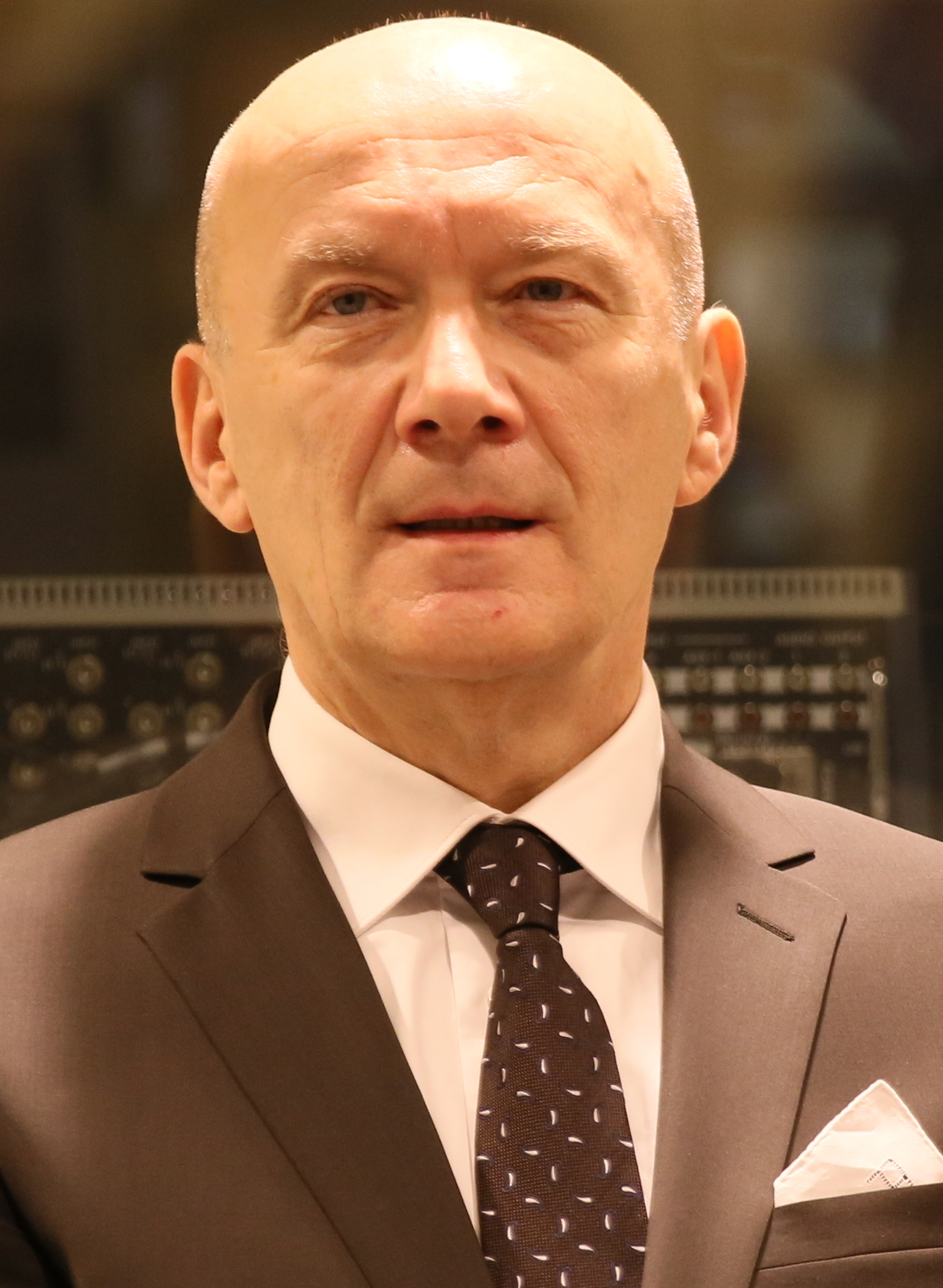
- Prlić in 2017

Prime Minister of Herzeg-Bosnia
- In office 20 November 1993 – 16 June 1996
- President: Mate Boban; Krešimir Zubak
- Preceded by: Office established
- Succeeded by: Pero Marković
Ministerial offices
Minister of Foreign Affairs
In office 3 January 1997 – 22 February 2001
Preceded by	Muhamed Sacirbey
Succeeded by	Zlatko Lagumdžija
Federal Minister of Defence
In office 23 June 1994 – 18 December 1996
Prime Minister	Haris Silajdžić; Izudin Kapetanović
Preceded by	Office established
Succeeded by	Ante Jelavić
Additional positions
Vice President of the Executive Council of SR Bosnia and Herzegovina
In office 1989–1991
President	Marko Ćeranić; Jure Pelivan

Personal details
- Born: 10 June 1959 (age 67) Đakovo, PR Croatia, FPR Yugoslavia
- Party: Croatian Democratic Union (1996–2000)
- Other political affiliations: League of Communists (1975–1990)
- Education: Faculty of Economics in Sarajevo
- Profession: Economist, politician
- Awards: Order of Duke Trpimir

Jadranko Prlić (pronounced [jâdraːŋko př̩ːlit͡ɕ]; born 10 June 1959) is a Bosnian Croat politician and convicted war criminal who served as Prime Minister of the Croatian Republic of Herzeg-Bosnia, an unrecognized entity within Bosnia and Herzegovina, from 1993 to 1996. From 1994 to 1996, he was the Federal Minister of Defence and from 1997 to 2001, the first Minister of Foreign Affairs after the Dayton Agreement.

In May 2013, Prlić was sentenced to 25 years by the International Criminal Tribunal for the former Yugoslavia for war crimes against Bosniaks during the Croat–Bosniak War.

== Early life and education ==
Around 1975, he joined the League of Communists. In 1987, he received his doctorate from the Faculty of Economics in Sarajevo. He passed through all levels of professorship before becoming a full professor. In 1989, Prlić became the Vice-President of the state Executive Council of Bosnia and Herzegovina. During and immediately after the 1990 elections he held the position of Acting President of the Bosnia and Herzegovina Government. In early March 1992, he travelled to the United States to study the U.S. approach to market economics. Upon his return to Mostar the city was under siege and Prlić joined the Croatian Defence Council and took active participation in war.

== Indictment ==
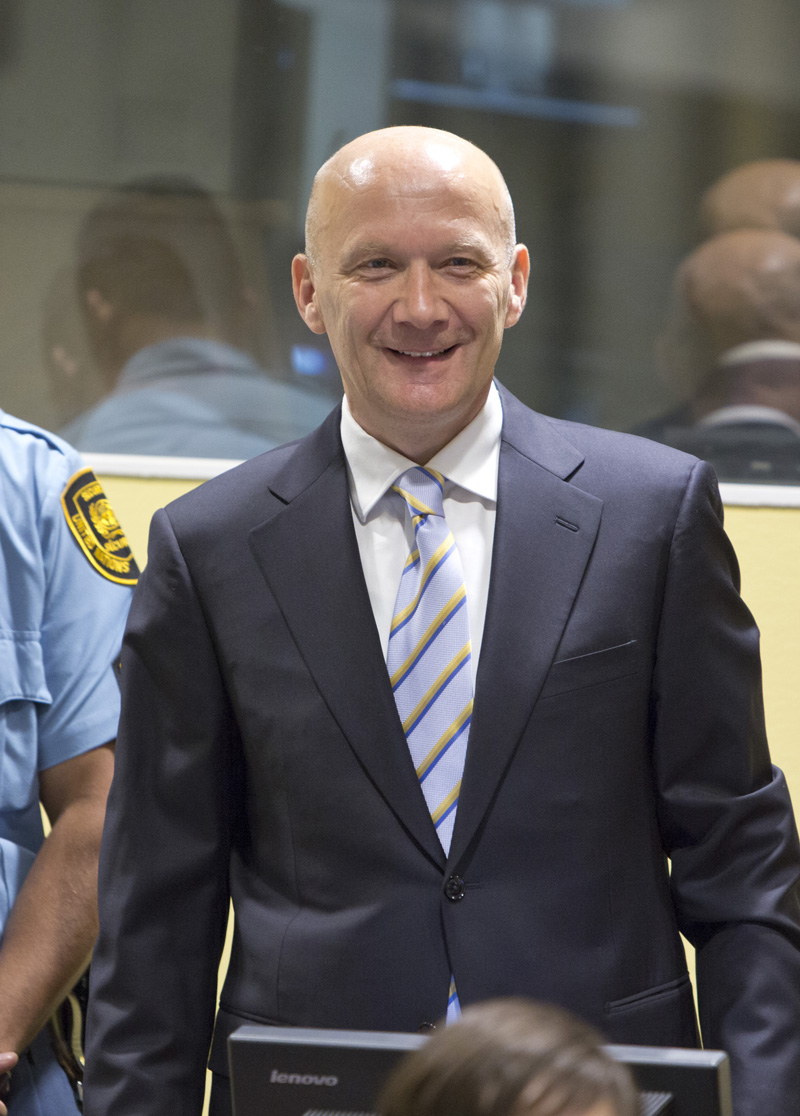
Prlić at the International Criminal Tribunal for the former Yugoslavia (ICTY) in 2013

The International Criminal Tribunal for the former Yugoslavia indictment states that as a leading politician of the Croatian Defence Council or HVO in the early 1990s Prlić had almost total power and control of the Croatian Republic of Herzeg-Bosnia government. Therefore, as the leader of the HVO government, he had the power to remove military and civilian commanders who had taken part in or ordered crimes against humanity. He had the power to close HVO concentrations camps.

He was charged with:

- 9 counts of grave breaches of the Geneva conventions (wilful killing; inhuman treatment (sexual assault); unlawful deportation of a civilian; unlawful transfer of a civilian; unlawful confinement of a civilian; inhuman treatment (conditions of confinement); inhuman treatment; extensive destruction of property, not justified by military necessity and carried out unlawfully and wantonly; appropriation of property, not justified by military necessity and carried out unlawfully and wantonly)
- 9 counts of violations of the laws or customs of war (cruel treatment (conditions of confinement); cruel treatment; unlawful labour; wanton destruction of cities, towns or villages, or destruction not justified by military necessity; destruction or wilful damage done to institutions dedicated to religion or education; plunder of public or private property; unlawful attack on civilians; unlawful infliction of terror on civilians; cruel treatment)
- 8 counts of crimes against humanity (persecutions on political, racial and religious grounds; murder; rape; deportation; inhumane acts (forcible transfer); imprisonment; inhumane acts (conditions of confinement); inhumane acts)

On 29 May 2013, in a first instance verdict, the ICTY sentenced Prlić to 25 years in prison. The tribunal also convicted five other war time leaders of the joint trial: defence minister of Herzeg-Bosnia Bruno Stojić (20 years), military officers Slobodan Praljak (20 years) and Milivoj Petković (20 years), military police commander Valentin Ćorić (16 years), and head of prisoner exchanges and detention facilities Berislav Pušić (10 years). The Chamber ruled, by majority, with the presiding judge Jean-Claude Antonetti dissenting, that they took part in a joint criminal enterprise (JCE) against the non-Croat population of Bosnia and Herzegovina. It concluded that "in the majority of cases, the crimes committed were not the random acts of a few unruly soldiers. On the contrary, these crimes were the result of a plan drawn up by members of the JCE whose goal was to permanently remove the Muslim population from Herceg-Bosna." The Chamber also ruled, by majority, that the JCE included the President of Croatia Franjo Tuđman, defence minister Gojko Šušak, and general Janko Bobetko. In November 2017, the ICTY reaffirmed the first-instance verdict that Tudjman, as well as some other senior Croatian officials, had participated in a joint criminal enterprise with the defendants with the aim of persecuting Bosniaks".

The ICTY Appeals Chamber affirmed almost all of the convictions against Prlić and his co-defendants, as well as their length of sentence, on 29 November 2017.

== Honours and decorations ==
=== International ===
Award or decoration	Country	Awarded by	Year	Place
Order of Duke Trpimir	Croatia	Franjo Tuđman	1995	Zagreb

== See also ==
- Joint criminal enterprise
