= Zlatko Lagumdžija =

Chairman of the Council of Ministers of Bosnia and Herzegovina from 2001 to 2002

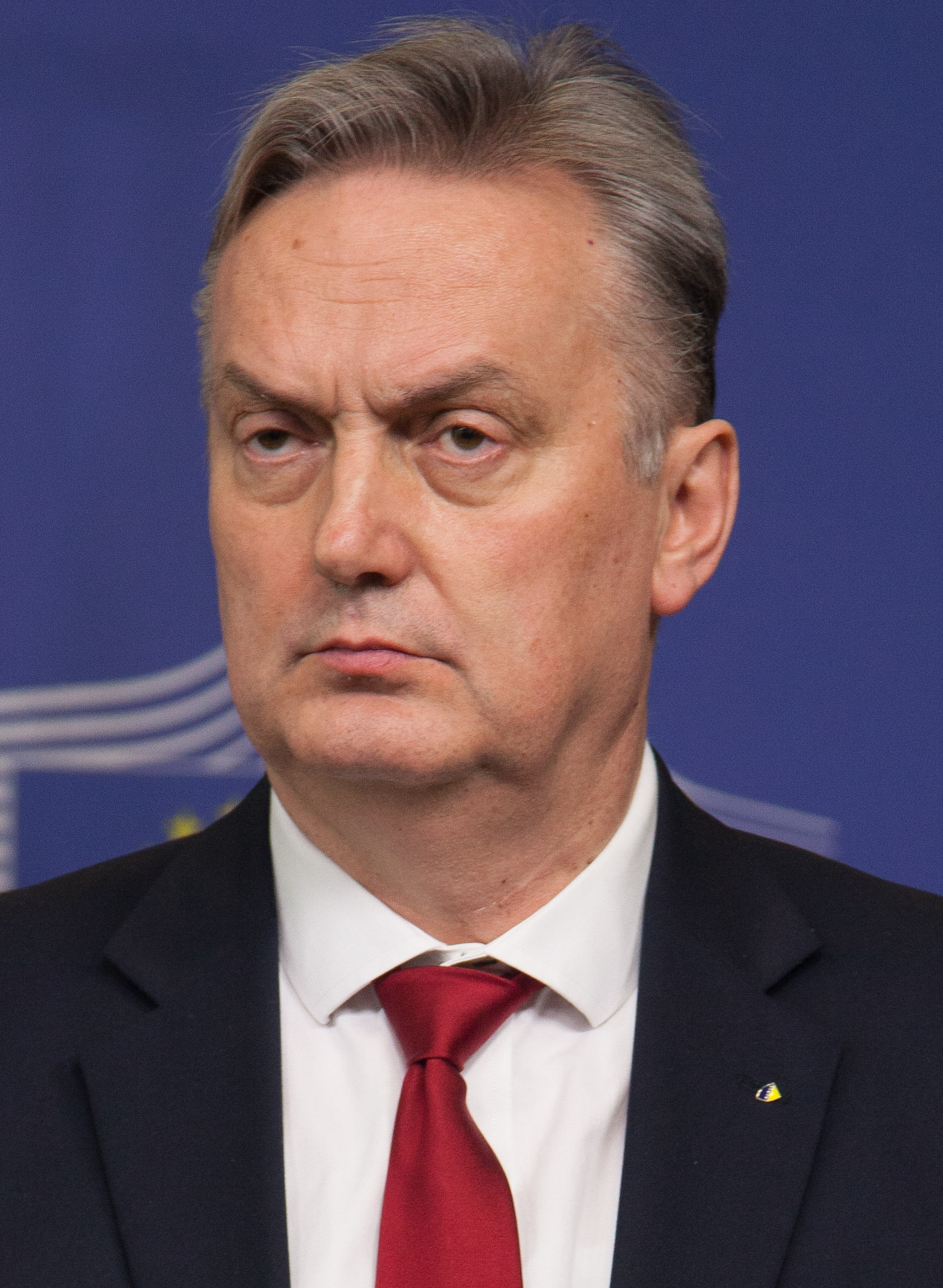
- Lagumdžija in 2013

Permanent Representative of Bosnia and Herzegovina to the United Nations
- Incumbent
- Assumed office 6 July 2023
- Preceded by: Sven Alkalaj

Chairman of the Council of Ministers of Bosnia and Herzegovina
- In office 18 July 2001 – 15 March 2002
- President: Beriz Belkić; Živko Radišić; Jozo Križanović
- Preceded by: Božidar Matić
- Succeeded by: Dragan Mikerević

Minister of Foreign Affairs
- In office 12 January 2012 – 31 March 2015
- Prime Minister: Vjekoslav Bevanda
- Preceded by: Sven Alkalaj
- Succeeded by: Igor Crnadak
- In office 22 February 2001 – 23 December 2002
- Prime Minister: Božidar Matić; Himself; Dragan Mikerević
- Preceded by: Jadranko Prlić
- Succeeded by: Mladen Ivanić

Deputy Prime Minister of the Republic of Bosnia and Herzegovina
- In office 25 October 1993 – 30 January 1996
- Prime Minister: Haris Silajdžić
- Preceded by: Božidar Matić
- Succeeded by: Dragan Mikerević
Parliamentary offices
Member of the House of Representatives
In office 23 December 2002 – 12 January 2012
Constituency	3rd Electoral Unit of the FBiH
In office 3 January 1997 – 22 February 2001
Additional positions
President of the Social Democratic Party
In office 6 April 1997 – 7 December 2014
Preceded by	Nijaz Duraković
Succeeded by	Nermin Nikšić

Personal details
- Born: 26 December 1955 (age 70) Sarajevo, PR Bosnia and Herzegovina, FPR Yugoslavia
- Party: Social Democratic Party (1992–2019)
- Other political affiliations: SKJ (1973–1991)
- Spouse: Amina Radonja
- Children: 3
- Parent(s): Salko Lagumdžija; Razija Lagumdžija
- Education: University of Sarajevo (BS, MS, PhD)

Zlatko Lagumdžija (born 26 December 1955) is a Bosnian politician and diplomat serving as the Permanent Representative of Bosnia and Herzegovina to the United Nations since July 2023. He served as Chairman of the Council of Ministers of Bosnia and Herzegovina from 2001 to 2002. Having also served as Minister of Foreign Affairs from 2001 to 2002 and from 2012 to 2015, he was president of the Social Democratic Party (SDP BiH) from 1997 to 2014 as well.

Lagumdžija was born in Sarajevo in 1955. His father Salko was mayor of Sarajevo in the 1960s. Lagumdžija graduated from the University of Sarajevo in 1981. He did postdoctoral research at the University of Arizona. Subsequently, he taught at the University of Sarajevo and later chaired the department of management information system at the Economics Faculty.

Lagumdžija began his political career during the Bosnian War as deputy Prime Minister of the Republic of Bosnia and Herzegovina, advising then-president of the presidency Alija Izetbegović. He accompanied Izetbegović at almost all of the peace plan negotiations during the war. In the 2000 parliamentary election, the SDP BiH formed a coalition with the Party for Bosnia and Herzegovina to gain the majority and force the nationalist parties out of power. Lagumdžija became both the Minister of Foreign Affairs and Chairman of the Council of Ministers. The SDP BiH-led government facilitated the passage of the Election Law, a prerequisite to Bosnia and Herzegovina's accession to the Council of Europe. Lagumdžija's party led the government until the 2002 general election, when the nationalist parties were elected back into power. He then served as member of the national House of Representatives.

Elected president of the SDP BiH in 1997, Lagumdžija has played a key role in constitutional reform talks, most notably in those regarding the 2010–2012 government formation. Following the October 2010 general election and the SDP BiH's emergence as the largest party in the House of Representatives, a government was formed around the SDP BiH and the Alliance of Independent Social Democrats in January 2012. Subsequently, Lagumdžija was once again appointed Minister of Foreign Affairs and served until 2015. Following the 2014 general election and a poor showing of the SDP BiH, he resigned as party leader after seventeen years. In 2019, he was removed from the SDP BiH due to political activity in his own new political organization.

Lagumdžija is a member of the Club of Madrid, an independent non-profit organization created to promote democracy and change in the international community.

== Education ==
Lagumdžija earned his high school diploma as a part of the Youth For Understanding exchange student program in Allen Park, Michigan in 1973.

His subsequent education was at the University of Sarajevo, where he earned a BS in 1977, an MS in 1981 and a PhD in 1988 in the field of Computer science and Electrical engineering.

In 1989, as a Fulbright Program participant, Lagumdžija did postdoctoral research at the University of Arizona in the Department of Management Information Systems and the Center for the Management of Information.

== Academic career ==
Lagumdžija began teaching at the University of Sarajevo in 1989 as a professor of management information system and informatics at the Economics Faculty and Projected Information Systems and Group Support Systems at the Electrical Engineering Faculty.

He served as the chair of the department of Management and Information Systems at the Economics Faculty since 1994 and the director of the director of the Management and Information Technologies Center (an organizational unit of the Economics Faculty) since 1995.

Lagumdžija's particular academic interests lie in the areas of Group Support Systems and management information systems. He is the author of six books and over a hundred papers in the field of management information systems.

At the end of the Bosnian War, Lagumdžija helped to secure funds from the Soros Foundation with which to rebuild the Group Support System facility at the University of Sarajevo. To create the facility, he worked with Douglas Vogel and Mark Adkins from the University of Arizona where generations of group support systems software and facilities have been built. The strategic objective of the Management and Information Technologies Center, which housed the GSS facility, was to "assist and promote the transition of Bosnia and Herzegovina to a democratic, market-driven economy."

As part of that mandate, the Center held sessions for key business and government leaders as well as students at the University of Sarajevo utilizing GSS technology to assist them in thinking about and planning for the economic reconstruction of Sarajevo.

== Political career ==
=== Wartime political career ===
Lagumdžija began his political career during the Bosnian War as deputy prime minister, and was also an adviser to then-president of the presidency Alija Izetbegović.

In one particular case, Lagumdžija advised Izetbegović not to sign the Vance–Owen Peace Plan: "Mr Izetbegović was not endorsing it, but thinking out loud and saying perhaps the plan would not be so bad, that we could live with it. And some of us told him, 'Anyone who signs this plan will be dead, and not just politically…'" he told a New York Times reporter in February 1993.

Izetbegović signed the peace plan in March 1993. In May 1992, Lagumdžija was with Izetbegović, Izetbegović’s daughter Sabina and his bodyguard, returning from the Lisbon negotiations, when they were surrounded at the Sarajevo International Airport by the Yugoslav People's Army, kidnapped and driven in a convoy to Lukavica, in Serb-held territory.

In April 1993, Lagumdžija met with a group of citizens from Srebrenica who had journeyed through the Serb lines to Sarajevo. They informed him of the desperate situation of Srebrenica and the eastern Bosnian enclaves. In an effort to highlight the plight of Srebrenica, Lagumdžija suspended humanitarian aid donations for Sarajevo until aid was delivered to the eastern enclaves. A month later, United Nations (UN) Commander Philippe Morillon visited Srebrenica and declared the citizens under the protection of the UN.

=== Post-war political career ===
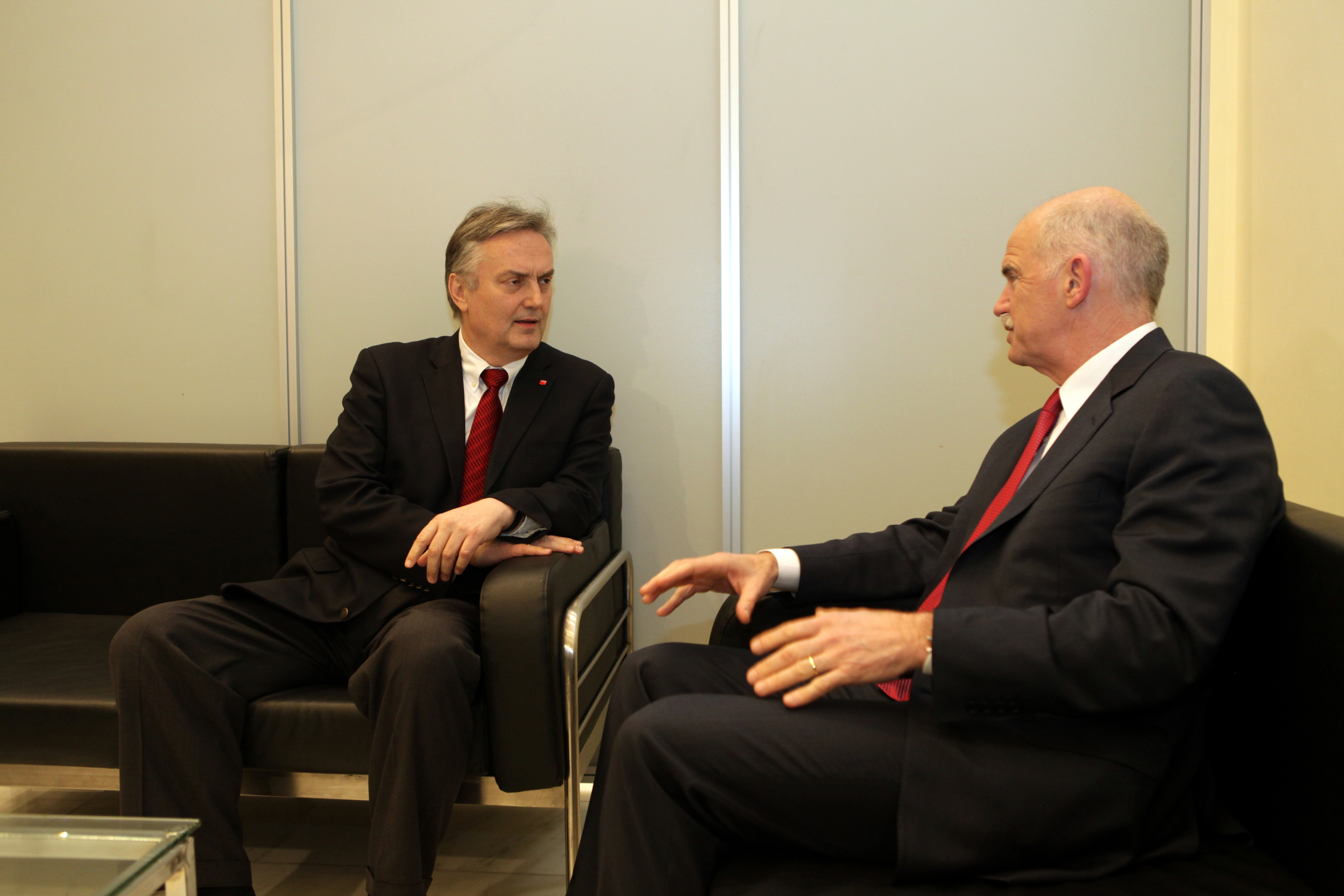
Lagumdžija with Greek Prime Minister George Papandreou, 4 March 2011

As a member of the Social Democratic Party (SDP BiH), Lagumdžija served as member of the national House of Representatives from 2002 to 2012. He was the president of the SDP BiH from 1997 to 2014.

In the 2000 parliamentary election, the SDP BiH formed a coalition with the Party for Bosnia and Herzegovina, a party founded and led by former wartime prime minister Haris Silajdžić, to gain the majority and force the nationalist parties out of power. They gathered a coalition of many other small parties to create the "Alliance for Change". Lagumdžija became the Foreign Minister, a post he served in from 2001 until 2002, and Chairman of the Council of Ministers, serving until 2002. After protracted negotiations, disagreements and delays, he signed the Agreement on Succession Issues of the Former Socialist Federal Republic of Yugoslavia on behalf of Bosnia and Herzegovina.

When the SDP BiH came into political power on a platform of economic reform and anti-corruption, Lagumdžija was lauded by the Western powers as the hopeful "face of a pluralistic, united Bosnia." The SDP BiH-led government facilitated the passage of the Election Law, which was not only an important step towards democracy, but also a prerequisite to Bosnia's accession to the Council of Europe. The SDP BiH led the coalition government until the October 2002 general election, when the public, dissatisfied at the pace of political reform, elected the nationalist parties back into power.

On 18 May 2019, Lagumdžija was removed from the SDP BiH due to his political activity in his own new political organization, the Social Democratic Movement, which was in the process of being founded, and which was also supported by Bosnian Presidency member and former SDP BiH vice-president Željko Komšić.

In January 2023, Bosnian Presidency member Denis Bećirović nominated Lagumdžija to serve as the Permanent Representative of Bosnia and Herzegovina to the United Nations. On 6 July 2023, he presented his credentials to UN secretary-general António Guterres and assumed office.

==== 2010–2012 government formation ====
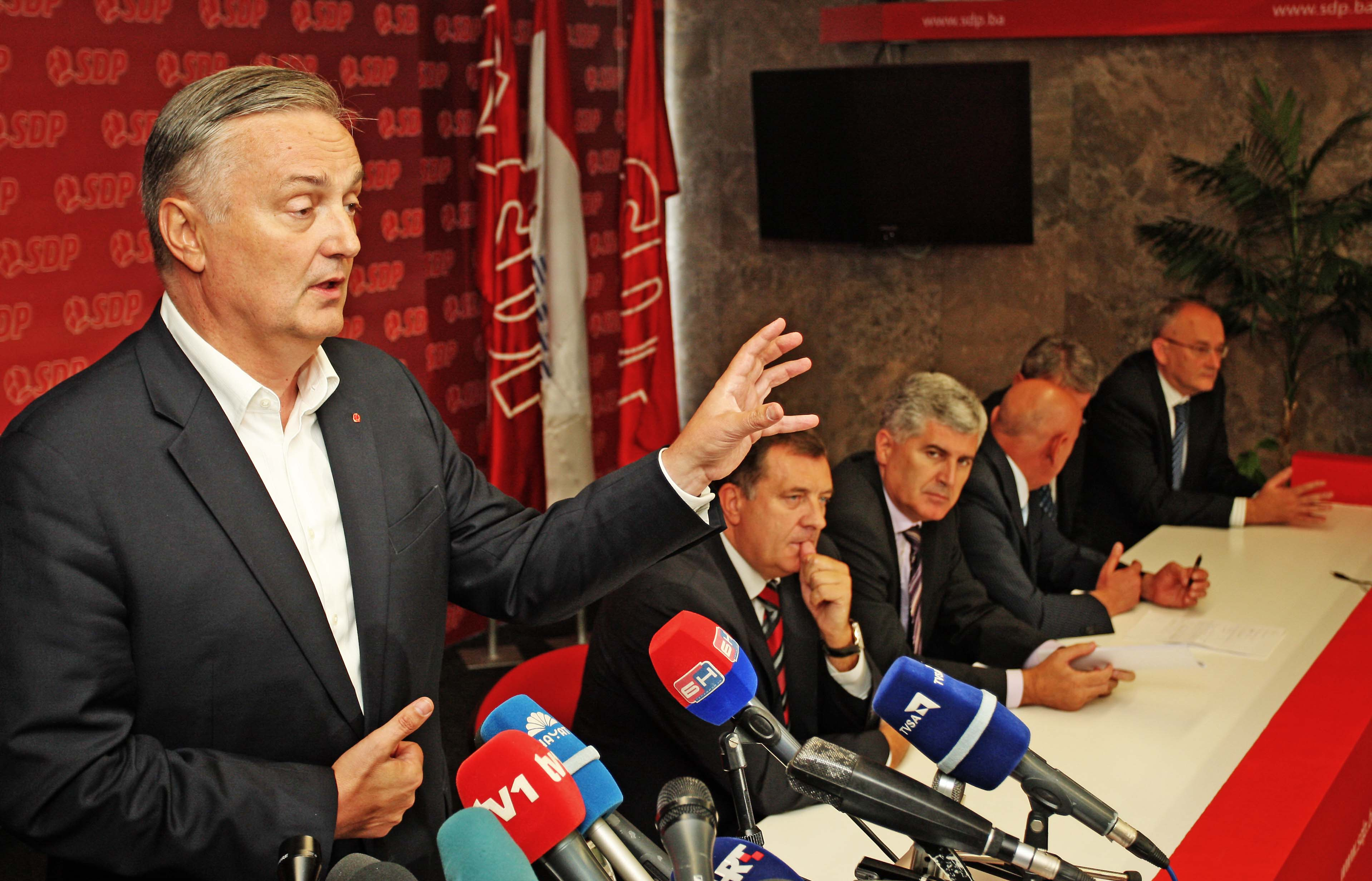
From left to right: Lagumdžija, Milorad Dodik, Dragan Čović and other Bosnian political leaders during government formation talks, 15 September 2011

Following the 2010 general election, a process of formation of Bosnia and Herzegovina's Council of Ministers (i.e. the national government) had begun. The resulting election produced a fragmented political landscape without a coalition of a parliamentary majority more than a year after the election. The SDP BiH, led by Lagumdžija, and the Bosnian Serb autonomist Alliance of Independent Social Democrats (SNSD), each had 8 MPs of the total 42 MPs of the House of Representatives.

The major Croat (HDZ BiH and HDZ 1990) and Serb parties (SNSD and SDS) contended that a gentlemen's agreement existed in which the chairmanship of the Council of Ministers rotates between the three constitutional nationalities. In this case, it would be the turn for a Croat politician to chair the Council. As the Croatian Democratic Union (HDZ BiH) and the Croatian Democratic Union 1990 (HDZ 1990) received the overwhelming share of Croat votes in the 2010 general election, the parties demanded that a member of one of them receive the position of Chairman. The SDP BiH on the other hand, claimed that the only necessity is the ethnicity of the individual, and not the party, demanding the right to appoint a Croat Chairman from SDP BiH ranks, calling upon the right of having assumed most votes nationwide.

The European Union and the Office of the High Representative repeatedly attempted negotiations to appease the Bosniak–Bosnian and Serb–Croat divided political blocs, in parallel to the Bosnian constitutional crisis, all ending in failure. The Bosniak-Bosnian coalition insisted that the seat would have to go to them as the party that received the largest number of votes, while the Serb–Croat alliance insisted that due to the fact that according to tradition, the next Chairman of the Council of Ministers must be an ethnic Croat, it must come from an authentic Croat party (Croatian Democratic Union), and not the multi-ethnic SDP BiH.

A round of talks between party leaders was held in Mostar on 5 September 2011, hosted by Croat politicians Božo Ljubić and Dragan Čović, with Milorad Dodik, Mladen Bosić, Sulejman Tihić and Lagumdžija in attendance. The parties agreed to a further round of discussion in mid-September. A meeting between the six major party leaders was held in Sarajevo on 15 September, hosted by Lagumdžija. Topics discussed at the meeting included holding a national census, military assets and the Sejdić-Finci ruling. On the same day, an EU spokesperson warned that the country risked losing funding through the Instrument for Pre-Accession Assistance if the political situation did not stabilize. Another meeting on 26 September 2011 failed as well.

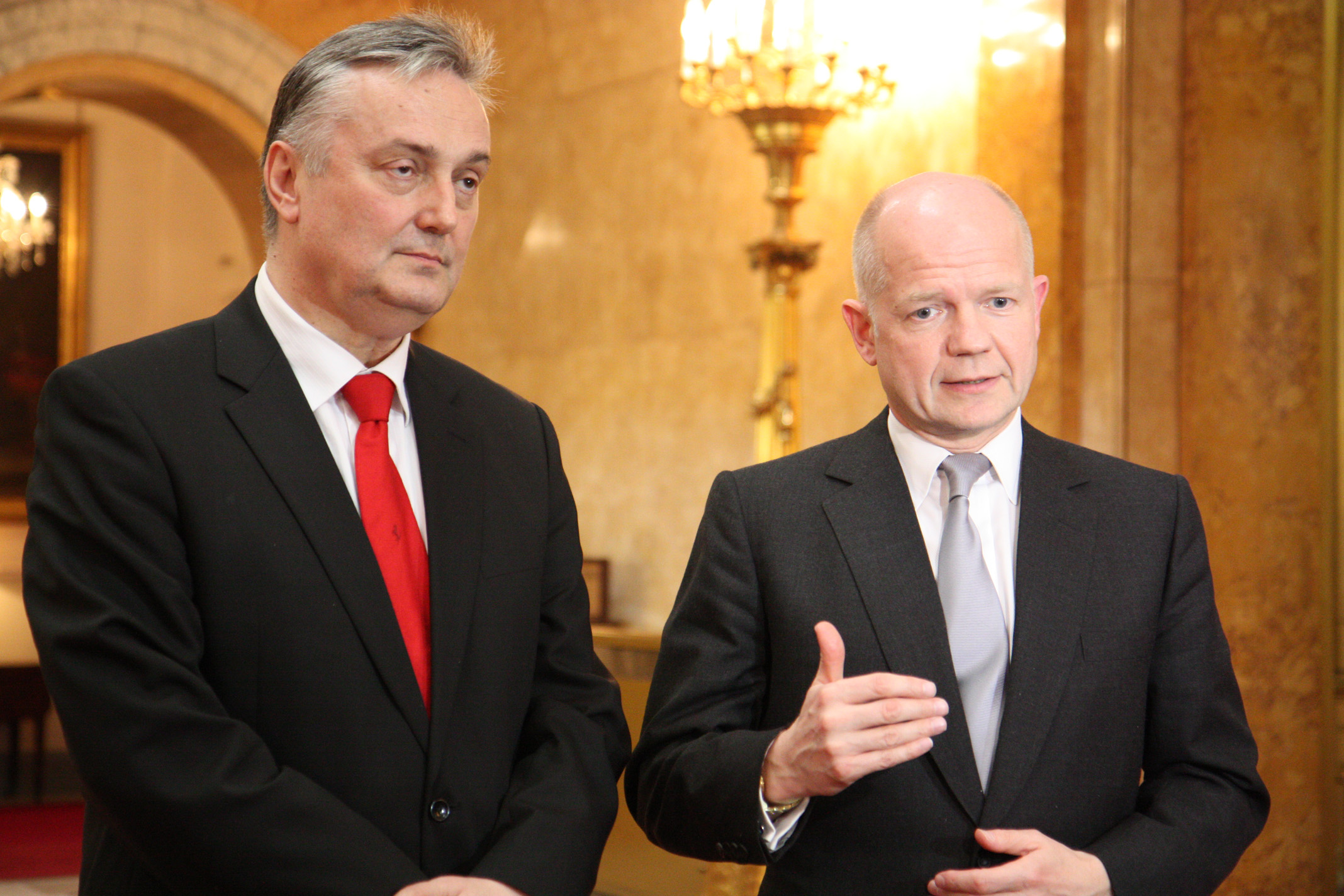
Lagumdžija with British Foreign Secretary William Hague, 27 March 2012

An agreement was finally reached on 28 December 2011 between the six political parties: the Social Democratic Party, the Party of Democratic Action (SDA), the Croatian Democratic Union, the Croatian Democratic Union 1990, the Serb Democratic Party and the Alliance of Independent Social Democrats. Vjekoslav Bevanda, a Bosnian Croat, became the new Chairman of the Council of Ministers.

Following the government's formation and Bevanda's appointment, Lagumdžija again became Minister of Foreign Affairs, serving until 2015.

==== Constitutional reform ====
As “credible efforts” towards the implementation of the Sejdić–Finci ruling remained the outstanding condition for the entry into force of the Stabilisation and Association Agreement, in June 2012, Czech Commissioner Štefan Füle launched a High Level Dialogue on the Accession Process (HLAD) with Bosnia and Herzegovina, tackling both the Sejdić–Finci issue and the need for a coordination mechanism for the country to speak with a single voice in the accession process. Talks were held in June and November 2012, with little success.

In the summer of 2012, HDZ BiH leader Dragan Čović and Lagumdžija agreed on the indirect election of the Bosnian Presidency members by the Bosnian Parliament, but the deal was not turned into detailed amendments. The HDZ BiH kept calling for electoral reform to prevent new Komšić cases. The same Željko Komšić left the SDP BiH shortly after, in dissent with the agreement which would have excluded him from acceding to power again. The SDA also opposed it, as it would have created a further asymmetry, with one Presidency member (from Republika Srpska) elected directly, and two elected indirectly.

In February 2013, the European Commission decided to step up its involvement, with the direct facilitation of talks by Füle, in coordination with the Council of Europe's secretary-general Thorbjørn Jagland. In March and April 2013, with the support of the Director-General for Enlargement Stefano Sannino, the EU Delegation in Sarajevo facilitated a series of direct talks between party leaders, with no concrete outcome.

== Controversies ==
=== Algerian Six ===
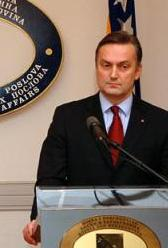
Lagumdžija as Minister of Foreign Affairs, 2001

In the end of 2001, six citizens of Algerian origin (the so-called "Algerian Six") were accused of planning a terrorist attack on the U.S. embassy in Sarajevo. They were taken into custody in October, and the Bosnian government, headed by Lagumdžija, revoked their citizenship in November. After a 3-month-process, the Supreme Court of the Federation of Bosnia and Herzegovina ordered their release based on lack of evidence.

However, Washington came out with a request for their extradition because "the U.S. still believes they are a threat to American interests and that the US Government refused to publicly disclose evidence to the court in Bosnia and Herzegovina because it would endanger its methods of intelligence-gathering." While the Council of Ministers of Bosnia and Herzegovina was deciding about this request, protests broke out in front of the Sarajevo prison. Eventually, Lagumdžija's government yielded to the demand, and the six were deported to Guantánamo Bay. In 2009, an investigation by the Cantonal prosecution of Sarajevo against Lagumdžija, the ex-Federal Minister of Interior Tomislav Limov and others involved was launched but later dropped. Another one was launched three years later, but it was dropped quickly too. Two of the three that returned to Bosnia still hold Lagumdžija responsible for their illegal imprisonment and filed a lawsuit against the state.

=== "Coup d'état affair" ===
In September 2003, Lagumdžija and Munir Alibabić, the former director of the Federal Intelligence and Security Service (FOSS), were accused of conspiring to take over the government by Ivan Vuksić, the FOSS director at the time. The accusations were based on the illegal recordings of telephone conversations between the two men. The Sarajevo daily paper Dnevni avaz picked up the story and ran a series of articles which attacked Lagumdžija and blamed him of being behind the August 2003 explosions that had taken place in Sarajevo. He denied the accusations and released a public statement to the court, which read in part, "Any well-informed and well-intentioned person will know that all these accusations are based on vicious lies, and that their progenitors are provoking a situation, which would bring them to face justice in court in any organized democratic state." The court dismissed the accusations, Lagumdžija eventually sued Dnevni avaz for libel and the newspaper was ordered to pay him 10,000 BAM in damages.

== Personal life ==
Lagumdžija's father Salko (1921–1973) was the 22nd mayor of Sarajevo from 1965 to 1967, while his mother, Razija (1925–1995), was a university professor. The family were close friends of prominent Yugoslav writer Meša Selimović.

Lagumdžija is married to Amina Radonja, and together they have two children, a son Zlatko Salko and a daughter Asja Zara. He also has another daughter, Dina, from his previous marriage. Asja Zara is an actress, and is best known for starring in the 2023 drama film Excursion.

Party political offices
Preceded by Nijaz Duraković	President of the Social Democratic Party; 1997–2014	Succeeded by Nermin Nikšić
Political offices
Preceded by Božidar Matić	Chairman of the Council of Ministers of Bosnia and Herzegovina; 2001–2002	Succeeded by Dragan Mikerević
Preceded by Jadranko Prlić	Minister of Foreign Affairs; 2001–2002	Succeeded by Mladen Ivanić
Preceded by Sven Alkalaj	Minister of Foreign Affairs; 2012–2015	Succeeded by Igor Crnadak
Diplomatic posts
Preceded by Sven Alkalaj	Permanent Representative of Bosnia and Herzegovina to the United Nations; 2023–present	Incumbent
