= Bisera Turković =

Bosnian diplomat and politician (born 1954)

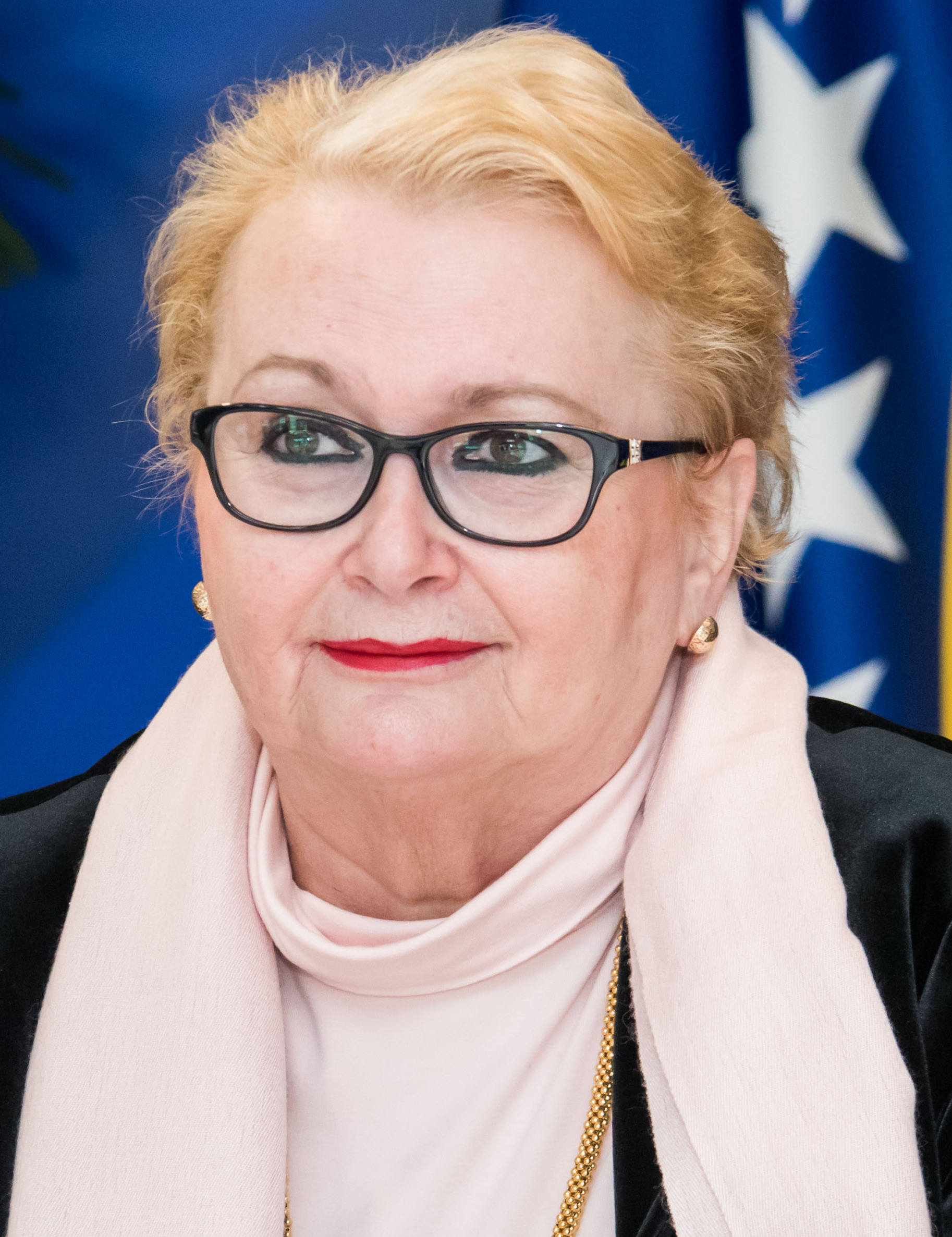
- Turković in 2022

Minister of Foreign Affairs
- In office 23 December 2019 – 25 January 2023
- Prime Minister: Zoran Tegeltija
- Preceded by: Igor Crnadak
- Succeeded by: Elmedin Konaković

Bosnia and Herzegovina Ambassador to the United States
- In office 3 October 2005 – 20 May 2009
- Preceded by: Igor Davidović
- Succeeded by: Mitar Kujundžić

Minister for European Integration
- In office 6 June 2000 – 22 February 2001
- Prime Minister: Spasoje Tuševljak; Martin Raguž
- Preceded by: Office established
- Succeeded by: Dragan Mikerević

Personal details
- Born: Bisera Rešić; 8 December 1954 (age 71) Sisak, PR Croatia, FPR Yugoslavia
- Party: Party of Democratic Action (1990–present)
- Spouse: Salih Turković (m. 1973, died)
- Children: 3
- Education: University of Sarajevo (LLB); Phillip Institute of Technology (BCJ); La Trobe University (MCJ); Pacific Western University (PhD)

Bisera Turković (née Rešić; born 8 December 1954) is a Bosnian diplomat and politician who served as Minister of Foreign Affairs from 2019 to 2023. She was the first female foreign minister of Bosnia and Herzegovina.

Born in Sisak in 1954, Turković holds a degree in law from the University of Sarajevo and a bachelor in Criminal Justice Administration from the Phillip Institute of Technology. She holds a PhD in international relations from the Pacific Western University. Following her studies, Turković worked as chief editor for Hayat TV. Her first assignments as ambassador were to Croatia, Hungary, and at Bosnia and Herzegovina's Permanent Mission to the Organization for Security and Co-operation in Europe.

From 2000 to 2001, Turković was Minister for European Integration. From 2004 to 2005, she served at Bosnia and Herzegovina's Permanent Mission to the United Nations as well as an ambassador to a few international organizations. Following that, Turković was the Bosnia and Herzegovina Ambassador to the United States from 2005 until 2009. She has been a member of the Party of Democratic Action since 1991.

Following Zoran Tegeltija's appointment as Chairman of the Council of Ministers, Turković was appointed Minister of Foreign Affairs in Tegeltija's cabinet in December 2019. She served as foreign minister until January 2023, when a new cabinet led by Borjana Krišto was formed.

== Early life and education ==
Turković was born in Sisak, present-day Croatia, on 8 December 1954 to a Croat mother and a Bosniak father. Her mother Katarina Kraus hails from Slovenia and her father Muharem Rešić hails from Prijedor. Her paternal grandfather Mehmedalija Rešić lived in the United States from 1909 to 1926, when he returned to Prijedor and married Bahta Mušić, her paternal grandmother. Mušić's family hailed from Užice, present-day Serbia, and resettled to Bosanska Kostajnica. Turković's parents separated when she was still a child and her mother moved to Australia. Turković lived with her paternal grandmother in Bosanska Kostajnica until she started school, when she moved to Zagreb where she lived with her father, simultaneously visiting her maternal grandparents Blanka Korez and Stefan Kraus, and her mother in Australia.

Turković holds a degree in law from the University of Sarajevo and a bachelor in Criminal Justice Administration from the Phillip Institute of Technology in Melbourne. She undertook postgraduate studies in Criminology at La Trobe University in Melbourne and holds a PhD in international relations from Pacific Western University.

== Career ==
In the early 1990s, Turković worked as chief editor for Hayat TV. She was the first bilateral ambassador appointed in the history of independent Bosnia and Herzegovina. Her first assignment as ambassador was in Zagreb, Croatia (1993–1994). During Turković's tenure, her Party of Democratic Action organised a massive weapons shipment, through Croatia from Iran to the Republic of Bosnia and Herzegovina, during the Bosnian War, although the United States had imposed a weapons embargo on Bosnia and Herzegovina.

Turković later served as an ambassador to Hungary (1994–1996), and at Bosnia and Herzegovina's Permanent Mission to the Organization for Security and Co-operation in Europe in Vienna (1996 to 2000). From 2000 to 2001, she was appointed Minister for European Integration in the governments of Spasoje Tuševljak and Martin Raguž.

From 2001 to 2004, Turković worked as an executive director of the Centre for Security Studies in Bosnia and Herzegovina, as well as a lecturer at the Faculty of Criminal Justice, University of Sarajevo. She has also given lectures at the University of Sarajevo, Webster University, the International University of Sarajevo and the University of Travnik as well as at George Washington University and at other major international universities. From 2004 to 2005, she served at Bosnia and Herzegovina's Permanent Mission to the United Nations in Vienna and as Ambassador to the International Atomic Energy Agency, the Comprehensive Nuclear-Test-Ban Treaty Organization, and the United Nations Industrial Development Organization. From 2005 until 2009, Turković served as Bosnia and Herzegovina's ambassador to the United States, Mexico and Brazil.

Her next diplomatic postings were in Brussels as a bilateral ambassador to Belgium and Luxembourg, as well as in Qatar from 2018 to 2019.

== Minister of Foreign Affairs (2019–2023) ==
=== Appointment ===
On 23 December 2019, Turković was appointed by the Party of Democratic Action as Minister of Foreign Affairs and also as vice-chairwoman of the Council of Ministers of Bosnia and Herzegovina in the government of Zoran Tegeltija. She was the first woman to serve both as foreign minister of the country and as vice-chairwoman of the Council of Ministers.

=== Tenure ===
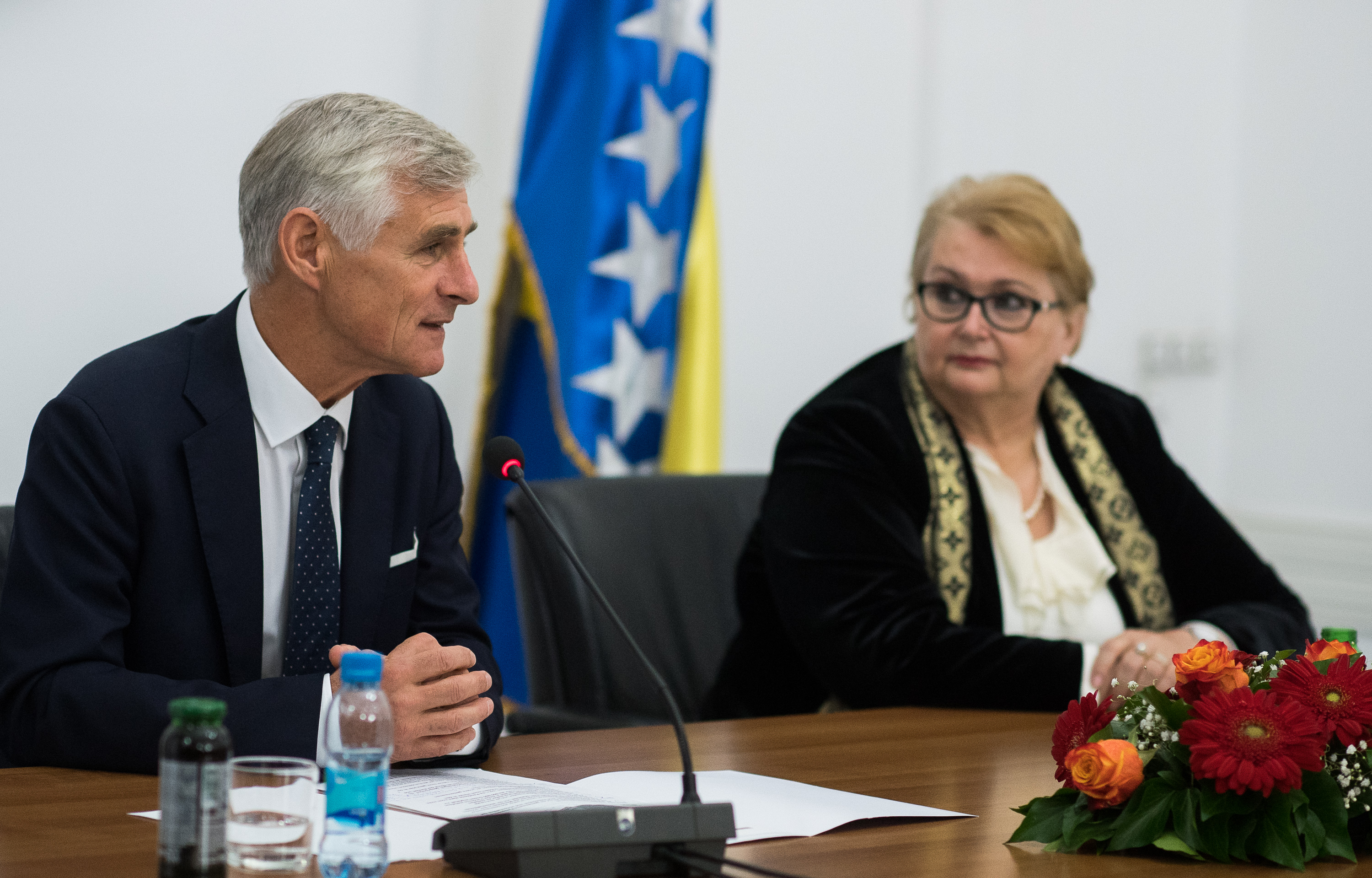
Turković with Austrian Foreign Minister Michael Linhart, 15 October 2021

In December 2020, Turković called for the abolishment of Republika Srpska, which was met with heavy criticism by Republika Srpska officials Radovan Višković and Željka Cvijanović who called her statement "hate speech."

On 24 March 2021, she met with the Chinese ambassador to Bosnia and Herzegovina in Sarajevo Ji Ping, who said that the Chinese Government had provided 50,000 COVID-19 vaccines for the COVID-19 pandemic for Bosnia and Herzegovina.

In June 2021, Turković had a heated diplomatic exchange with Russian Ambassador to the United Nations Vasily Nebenzya at a United Nations Security Council meeting in New York City. The topic of the meeting was the political situation in Bosnia and Herzegovina, with focus being on the Office of the High Representative for the country, regarding if it's time for its closure after being created in 1995 following the Bosnian War. Her address at the Security Council was heavily criticized by the Serb member of the Bosnian Presidency and also its Chairman Milorad Dodik, the presiding member of the Presidency, which collectively serves as the country's head of state. Some days before, Dodik unsuccessfully tried to prevent Turković's Security Council address, even writing a letter to Russian Foreign Minister Sergey Lavrov asking him for help.

On 14 July 2021, Turković and the Bosnian Defence Minister Sifet Podžić met with NATO Secretary General Jens Stoltenberg in Brussels. On 21 July, she met with British Minister for European Neighbourhood and the Americas Wendy Morton.

In September 2021, Turković withdrew Aida Smajić, the Bosnian Ambassador to neighbouring Serbia, from her office in Belgrade for urgent consultations, regarding the arrest of Edin Vranj, a former high-ranking official of the Federal Police Administration, upon him entering Serbia due to accusations of alleged war crimes during the Bosnian War. On 18 October 2021, she confirmed Vranj was released from custody, sending regards to the Serbian authorities in the process. At the 28th OSCE Ministerial Council in Stockholm, held in December 2021, Turković met with British Foreign Secretary Liz Truss, as well as United States Secretary of State Antony Blinken. On 21 December, she held a bilateral meeting with Russian Foreign Minister Sergey Lavrov in Sochi.

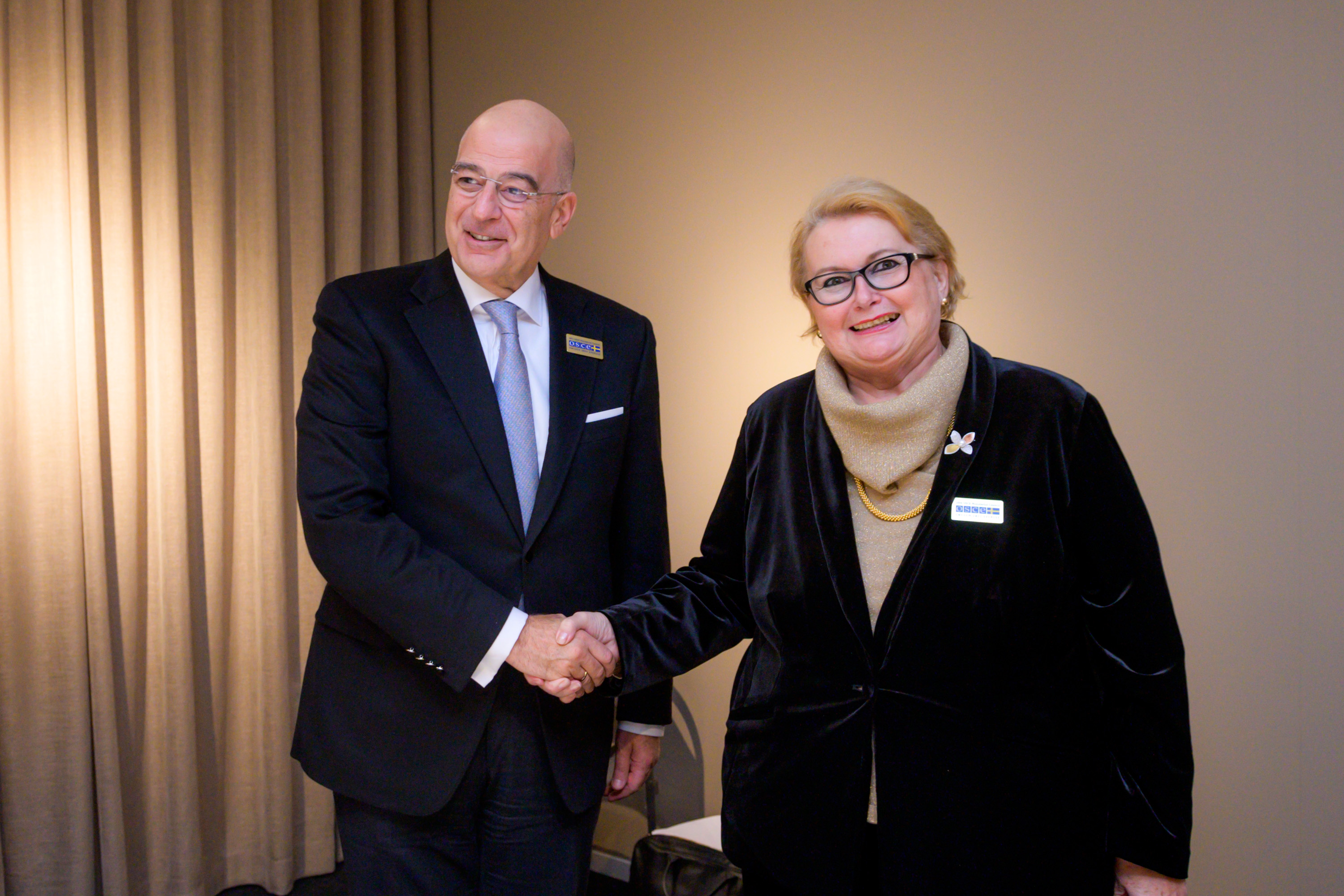
Turković alongside Greek Foreign Minister Nikos Dendias at the 28th OSCE Ministerial Council, 2 December 2021

On 24 February 2022, Russian president Vladimir Putin ordered a large-scale invasion of Ukraine, marking a dramatic escalation of the Russo-Ukrainian War that began in 2014. Regarding the invasion, Turković stated "Bosnia and Herzegovina remains firmly committed to Ukraine's sovereignty and territorial integrity, and we call for an immediate end to fighting and shelling. OSCE principles, security and international law are under attack today. Hostility and suffering of innocent civilians must end immediately", and also called on Russia and Belarus to refrain from using force in the interests of peace, regional and global stability.

On 10 March 2022, she had a meeting with German Foreign Minister Annalena Baerbock upon Baerbock's state visit to Bosnia and Herzegovina, during which Turković asked for accelerated start of European Union membership talks in light of Russia's invasion of Ukraine.

In October 2022, Croatian Foreign Minister Gordan Grlić-Radman accused Turković of visiting the Islamic countries for buying arms. She referred to the remark as a "dangerous falsehood."

Turković was succeeded as Foreign Minister by the People and Justice party president Elmedin Konaković on 25 January 2023, following the formation of a new government presided over by Borjana Krišto.

==== Relations with Iran ====
On 21 July 2021, Turković spoke in a telephone call with Iranian Foreign Minister Mohammad Javad Zarif. On 4 August 2021, she met with Iranian President Ebrahim Raisi in Tehran, attending his inauguration the following day.

On 6 December 2022, amid the Mahsa Amini protests, Turković met with Iran's Foreign Minister Hossein Amir-Abdollahian. The meeting with Abdollahian was boycotted by the Bosnian Serb and Bosnian Croat representatives, with an explanation that all the civilised world disassociates from and stands against the suppression of human rights in Iran. Turković stated that "Iran is our partner and a friend, and a country that unequivocally supports the territorial integrity and independence of Bosnia and Herzegovina. They supported us in the time of defence and construction of Bosnia and Herzegovina, for which we remain thankful." She added that "little is told about the rights in Afghanistan and Palestine and in the end about human rights in our country". Turković criticised stereotypes in the media and said in the end "imagine me talking to you vailed like this, what would be your perception, stereotype? Human rights include a right of clothes, that everyone should wear what they want and be equally treated".

== Other activities ==
- World Bank, Ex-Officio Member of the Board of Governors (since 2019)
- Multilateral Investment Guarantee Agency (MIGA), World Bank Group, Ex-Officio Member of the Board of Governors (since 2019)

== See also ==
- List of female foreign ministers
- List of foreign ministers in 2019
- List of foreign ministers in 2020
- List of foreign ministers in 2021
- List of foreign ministers in 2022
- List of foreign ministers in 2023

== Footnotes ==
Political offices
Preceded by Igor Crnadak	Minister of Foreign Affairs; 2019–2023	Succeeded by Elmedin Konaković
