= Irfan Ljubijankić =

Bosniak musician, diplomat and politician (1952–1995)

Minister of Foreign Affairs
- In office 30 October 1993 – 28 May 1995
- Prime Minister: Haris Silajdžić
- Preceded by: Haris Silajdžić
- Succeeded by: Muhamed Sacirbey

Personal details
- Born: 26 November 1952 Bihać, PR Bosnia and Herzegovina, FPR Yugoslavia
- Died: 28 May 1995 (aged 42) Cetingrad, Croatia
- Party: Party of Democratic Action (1990–1995)
- Education: University of Belgrade; University of Zagreb

Irfan Ljubijankić (26 November 1952 – 28 May 1995) was a Bosnian diplomat, politician, accomplished surgeon, and a classical music composer, who served as Minister of Foreign Affairs of the Republic of Bosnia and Herzegovina from 30 October 1993 until he was killed on 28 May 1995 while on diplomatic mission during the Bosnian War.

== Biography ==
Ljubijankić was born to a Bosniak family in Bihać, Yugoslavia, the town in which he lived for most of his life. He graduated from the University of Belgrade's School of Medicine and became a medical doctor specializing in ear, nose and throat treatments.

In 1990, as Bosnia was preparing to secede from Yugoslavia, he was elected to the Bosnian parliament and became a leading member of the Bosniak-dominated Party of Democratic Action. He temporarily left politics in 1992 after the beginning of the Bosnian War, in order to serve as a medical doctor in Bihać.

Ljubijankić remained an active medical doctor until October 1993 when he became Minister of Foreign Affairs. He traveled widely to help gain international support for the country. Shortly before his death, he represented Bosnia and Herzegovina at the 50th anniversary celebration of the end of World War II in London on 1 May 1995.

== Death ==
Ljubijankić was killed on 28 May 1995 when his helicopter was shot down by a missile over Cetingrad, a Croatian town near the Bosnian border being held by Serb rebels at that time. He was flying from Bihać to Zagreb on government business. Six other people on the helicopter also died. Ljubijankić was married and had two children.

After Ljubijankić's death, the singer Cat Stevens, one of Ljubijankić's friends, appeared at a 1997 benefit concert in Sarajevo and recorded a benefit album named after a song written by Ljubijankić, titled I Have No Cannons That Roar.
