= Muhamed Sacirbey =

Bosnian-American diplomat (born 1956)

Minister of Foreign Affairs
- In office 3 June 1995 – 30 January 1996
- Prime Minister: Haris Silajdžić
- Preceded by: Irfan Ljubijankić
- Succeeded by: Jadranko Prlić

Bosnia and Herzegovina Ambassador to the United Nations
- In office 22 May 1992 – 31 December 2000
- Preceded by: Office established
- Succeeded by: Mirza Kušljugić

Personal details
- Born: Muhamed Šaćirbegović; 20 July 1956 (age 70) Sarajevo, PR Bosnia and Herzegovina, FPR Yugoslavia
- Spouse: Susan Sacirbey
- Parent(s): Nedžib Šaćirbegović; Aziza Šaćirbegović
- Education: Tulane University (LLB); Columbia University (MBA)

Muhamed "Mo" Sacirbey (born Muhamed Šaćirbegović; 20 July 1956) is a Bosnian-American lawyer, businessman and diplomat. He rose to prominence in the 1990s when he was appointed as the first Bosnia and Herzegovina Ambassador to the United Nations, serving from 1992 to 2000. Sacirbey also simultaneously served as Minister of Foreign Affairs of the Republic of Bosnia and Herzegovina from 1995 to 1996.

== Early life ==
Muhamed Sacirbey was born Muhamed Šaćirbegović in Sarajevo, FPR Yugoslavia. Both of Sacirbey's parents were doctors. His father Nedžib Šaćirbegović (1926–2021) was a member of the organisation "Young Muslims" (Mladi Muslimani) and a close friend of Alija Izetbegović, the first and only president of the Republic of Bosnia and Herzegovina. Izetbegović and Sacirbey's father were imprisoned for opposing the communist government of SFR Yugoslavia following World War II.

In 1963, the family left SFY Yugoslavia due to his father's and mother's anti-communist politics (both had spent time in prison for their activities) and lived for a while in Turkey and Libya before settling in the United States in 1967. The Šaćirbegović family lived in Parma, Ohio, a suburb of Cleveland, Ohio, and became naturalized citizens in 1973. It was at this point that the family name was changed to Sacirbey. Sacirbey attended Valley Forge High School in Parma Heights, Ohio. "Mo" was elected student council representative even before he became a U.S. citizen. At Valley Forge, he played American football as a linebacker and was named Most Valuable Defensive Player in 1973.

Sacirbey attended Tulane University in New Orleans on a football scholarship and subsequently received a law degree from Tulane Law School and an MBA at Columbia Business School. Sacirbey served as legal counsel to Standard & Poor's. Most of Sacirbey's professional career was spent as an investment banker on Wall Street.

Sacirbey has a younger brother Omer, who is a journalist in Boston. In the 1990s, a street was named after their mother, Aziza, in Sarajevo.

== Bosnian War ==
When the Bosnian War began in April 1992, Sacirbey was asked to assist the fledgling state gain admission to the United Nations. He became Bosnia and Herzegovina's first ambassador to the United Nations. He began his term on 22 May 1992, the day that Bosnia and Herzegovina was admitted to the UN. During the war, he made many impassioned pleas for the lifting of the arms embargo against the Bosnian government and made repeated calls for the UN to protect the so-called safe areas from indiscriminate attacks. He traveled the world in a bid for support. Former President Bill Clinton, who in private referred to him as "Ambassador Mo" wrote of Sacirbey in his book "My Life": "Holbrooke and his team landed in the Croatian coastal city of Split, where they briefed the Bosnian foreign minister, Muhamed Sacirbey, on our plans. Sacirbey was the eloquent public face of Bosnia on American television, a handsome, fit man who, as a student in the United States had been a starting football player at Tulane University. He had long sought greater American involvement in his beleaguered nation and was glad the hour had finally come."

In May 1995, the foreign minister of Bosnia and Herzegovina, Irfan Ljubijankić was assassinated in Cetingrad. Sacirbey was appointed to replace him for a brief period. Sacirbey also had become Bosnia's Agent before the International Court of Justice leading the country's genocide case against Serbia/Montenegro from outset from 1993 to 2001. Sacirbey was also instrumental in seeing the International Criminal Tribunal for the former Yugoslavia (ICTY) and was an informal representative as well as witness many years later from 2003 until 2009.

In November 1995, he accompanied the Bosnian delegation to the peace negotiations in Dayton, Ohio. The settlement came to be known as the Dayton Agreement. During the talks, Sacirbey actually delivered his resignation as foreign minister to protest what he perceived as accommodation of Serbia's strongman Slobodan Milošević and legitimization of ethnic cleansing. Subsequently, Sacirbey alleged that a "yellow light" had been given to Milošević by US and European representatives to overrun the UN and NATO protected "safe areas" of Srebrenica, Žepa and Goražde. He has testified to such effect before the ICTY.

Sacirbey also represented Bosnia to the Rome negotiations on the International Criminal Court (ICC), and after successfully working to incorporate "gender based" crimes and eliminate the death penalty (with an accomplished team of young jurists incorporated into his delegation), was a subsequent signatory on the Rome Treaty. Sacirbey had been an advocate and active in the establishment of the ICC and became Vice-Chair of the Prep Committee on the ICC.

== Controversy ==
After the war, Sacirbey continued to serve as ambassador to the UN until late 2000. Upon leaving this position, rumors of financial irregularities in the Bosnian UN mission began to circulate. In 2001, the Bosnian government began to investigate Sacirbey on suspicion "of abuse of office" for purportedly expending funds for purposes not authorized including Bosnia's "genocide case" against Serbia/Montenegro before the International Court of Justice.

Sacirbey denied allegations of any improper use of funds and said the entire affair was fabricated by political opponents in Bosnia and the United States. He also stated he spent up to $800,000 of his own money to cover Bosnia's diplomatic expenses. Although there was no indictment, formal charges or even formal investigation, on 29 January 2002, the Bosnian government formally asked the US to extradite Sacirbey. Sacirbey had offered to deliver himself should such be requested. However, he was arrested on 25 March 25, 2003 at his home in Staten Island. Sacirbey spent the next sixteen months at the Metropolitan Correctional Center in New York. He was released on 27 July 2004 with a six-million-dollar bail, and the recommendation of the Bosnian Chairman of the Council of Ministers (i.e. the Prime Minister) who referred to Sacirbey as "an honorable person", whether or not allegations of abuse of office may have been accurate.

Sacirbey from the outset contended that the U.S. Government was dictating the extradition request upon obedient Bosnian authorities, including misrepresenting the status of any "investigation" in Bosnia or alleged abuse of office. On 19 January 2005, he was certified by a federal magistrate in New York as extraditable. Sacirbey appealed his certification by filing a habeas corpus petition on 21 March 2005 before a federal district judge. In September 2006, the district judge denied his petition for habeas corpus relief and ruled that he was extraditable. Sacirbey appealed the decision to the United States Court of Appeals for the Second Circuit.

On 9 December 2009, the appeals court ruled that Sacirbey could not be extradited. Further, the Court cited Sacirbey's exemplary service and questionable political circumstances of the case. Finally, the Court concluded that the US Government had no obligation to extradite Sacirbey, should not have pursued the matter in the first place and on the basis of evidence/case presented not to repeat the mistake.

== Works ==
- A Convenient Genocide in a Fishbowl, by Mohammed Sacerbey

Diplomatic posts
Preceded by Office established	Bosnia and Herzegovina Ambassador to the United Nations; 1992–2000	Succeeded by Mirza Kušljugić
