= Bosnia and Herzegovina–United States relations =

- Bosnia and Herzegovina: United States

Diplomatic mission
- Bosnian and Herzegovinian Embassy, Washington, D.C.: United States Embassy, Sarajevo

Envoy
- Ambassador Sven Alkalaj: Ambassador John Ginkel

Relations between Bosnia and Herzegovina and the United States are described as very strong.

== History ==
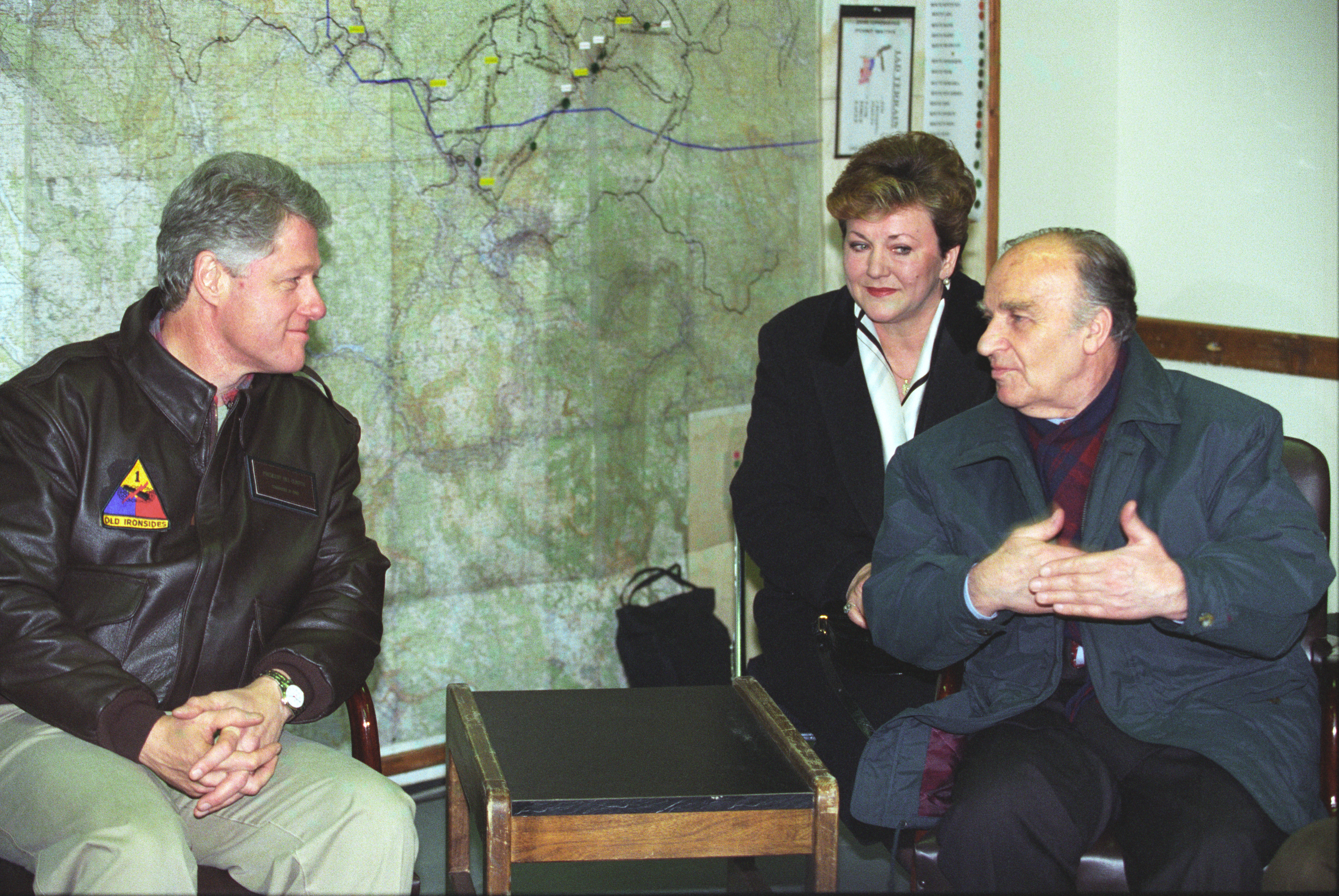
U.S. President Bill Clinton and Bosnian Presidency member Alija Izetbegović in Tuzla, 22 December 1997

The 1992–95 war in Bosnia and Herzegovina was ended with the help of participation by the United States in brokering the 1995 Dayton Agreement. The United States maintains command of the NATO headquarters in Sarajevo. The United States has donated hundreds of millions of dollars to help with infrastructure, humanitarian aid, economic development, and military reconstruction in Bosnia and Herzegovina. The U.S. Agency for International Development (USAID) and Support for Eastern European Democracies (SEED) has played a large role in post-war Bosnia and Herzegovina, including programs in economic development and reform, democratic reform (media, elections), infrastructure development, and training programs for Bosnian professionals, among others. Additionally, there are many non-governmental organizations (NGOs) that have likewise played significant roles in the reconstruction.

According to the 2012 U.S. Global Leadership Report, 33% of Bosnia's people approve of U.S. leadership, with 49% disapproving and 18% uncertain.

According to the American embassy in Sarajevo, from 1995 to 2024, USAID spent $2 billion in Bosnia and Herzegovina, with two-thirds of the funds being spent in the Federation of Bosnia and Herzegovina and the remaining third in Republika Srpska. The country's non-governmental sector was heavily affected by the Trump administration's decision to freeze USAID projects in early 2025.

== Diplomatic missions ==
The U.S. Embassy in Bosnia and Herzegovina is in Sarajevo. The current Chargé d'affaires is John Ginkel.

The Embassy of Bosnia and Herzegovina in Washington, D.C. is Bosnia and Herzegovina's diplomatic mission to the United States. It is located at 2109 E Street N.W. in Washington, D.C.'s Foggy Bottom neighborhood. The embassy also operates a Consulate-General in Chicago. The current Ambassador is Sven Alkalaj.

== Gallery ==
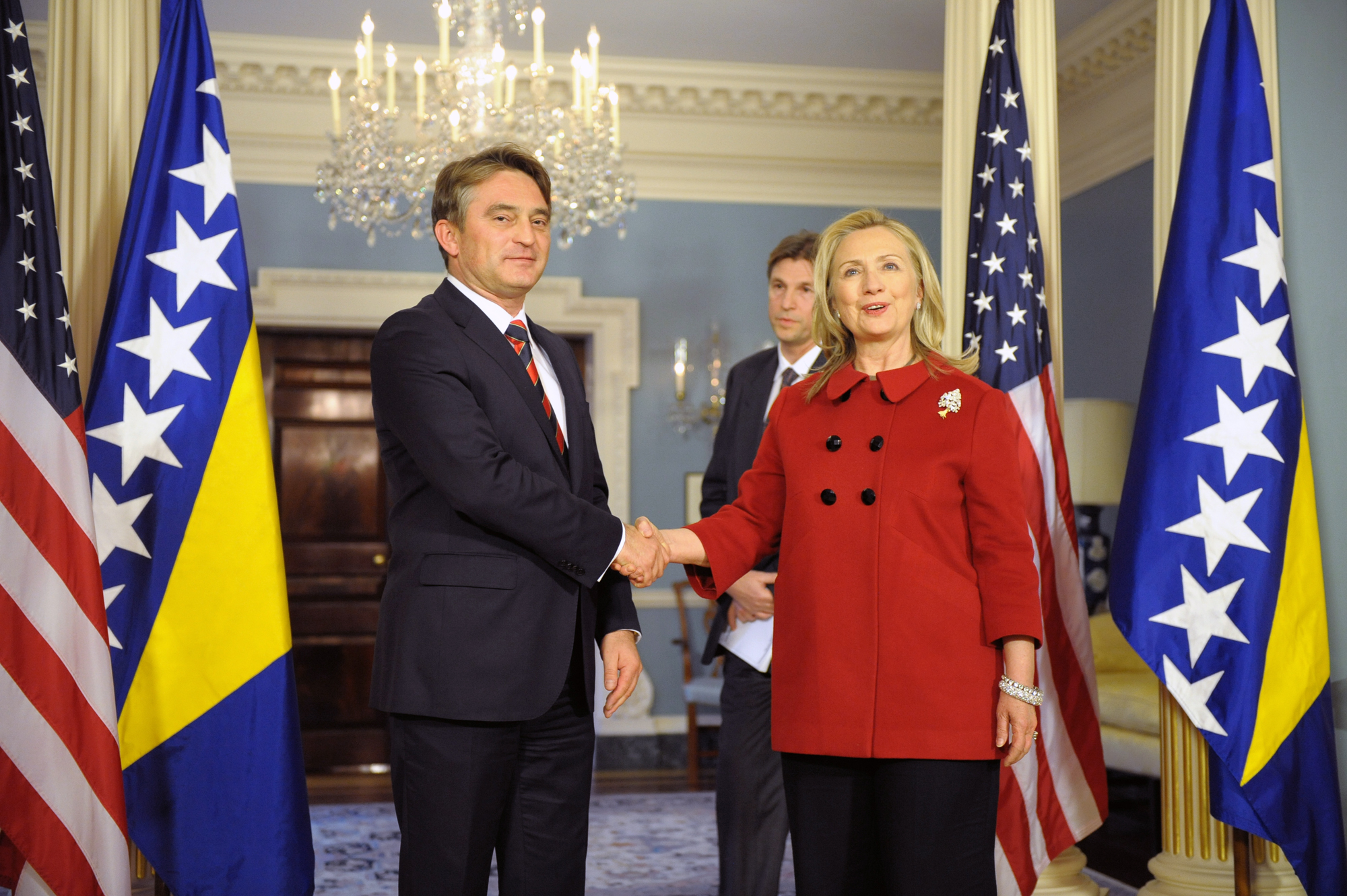
Bosnian Presidency member Željko Komšić and U.S. Secretary of State Hillary Clinton in Washington, D.C., 2011

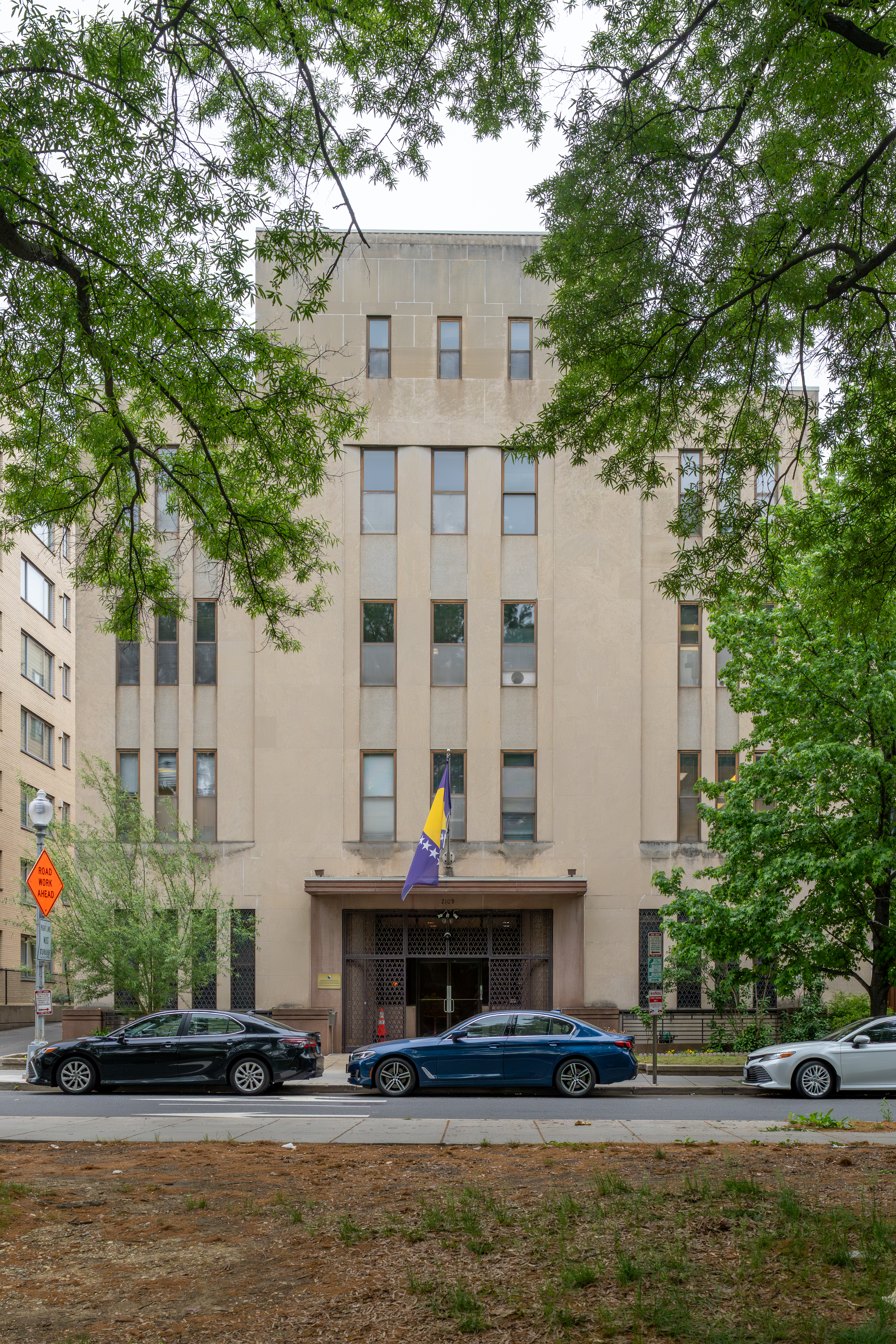
The embassy of Bosnia and Herzegovina in Washington, D.C.

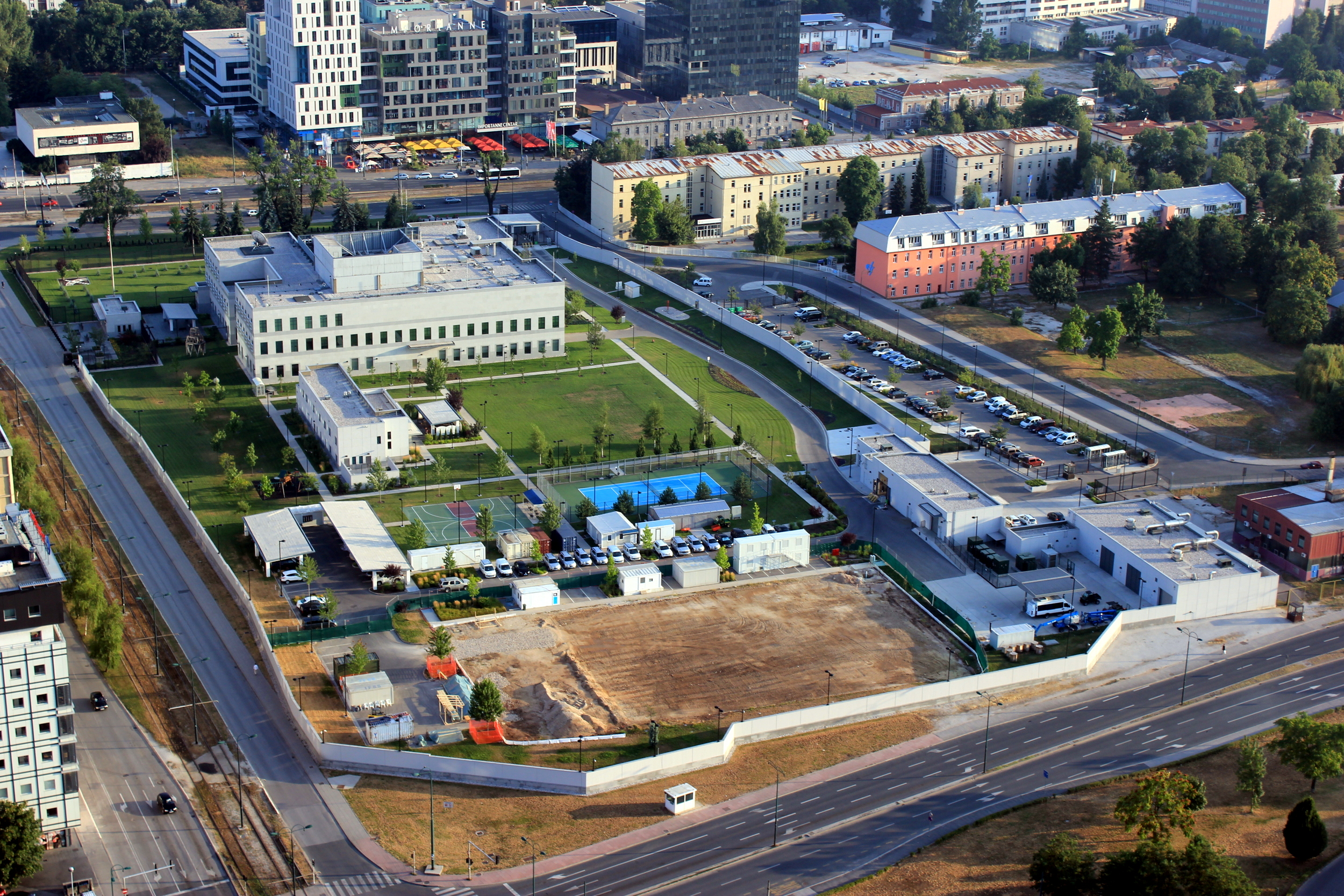
The embassy of the United States in Sarajevo

== See also ==
- Bosnian Americans
- United States–Yugoslavia relations
