= Miloš Prica =

Bosnian Serb diplomat (born 1961)

Permanent Representative of Bosnia and Herzegovina to the United Nations
- In office 8 September 2005 – 8 January 2009
- Preceded by: Mirza Kušljugić
- Succeeded by: Ivan Barbalić

Personal details
- Born: 7 March 1961 (age 65) Chicago, Illinois, U.S.
- Education: University of Belgrade

Miloš Prica (born 7 March 1961) is a Bosnian government official and diplomat who served as the Permanent Representative of Bosnia and Herzegovina to the United Nations from 2005 to 2009. He previously served as deputy Permanent Representative to the United Nations from 2000 to 2005.

Prica was born in Chicago, Illinois, U.S. on 7 March 1961. Following the Bosnian War, he served as Chief of Staff to the President of Republika Srpska, one of two entities of Bosnia and Herzegovina, from 1996 to 1998. He was then an adviser to the Prime Minister of the Republika Srpska on foreign relations from 1998 to 1999.

Appointed as the permanent representative to the UN by the Presidency of Bosnia and Herzegovina, Prica presented his credentials to UN secretary-general Kofi Annan on 8 September 2005. He served as permanent representative until 8 January 2009.

Diplomatic posts
Preceded by Mirza Kušljugić	Permanent Representative of Bosnia and Herzegovina to the United Nations; 2005–2009	Succeeded by Ivan Barbalić
