= Sven Alkalaj =

Bosnian diplomat (born 1948)

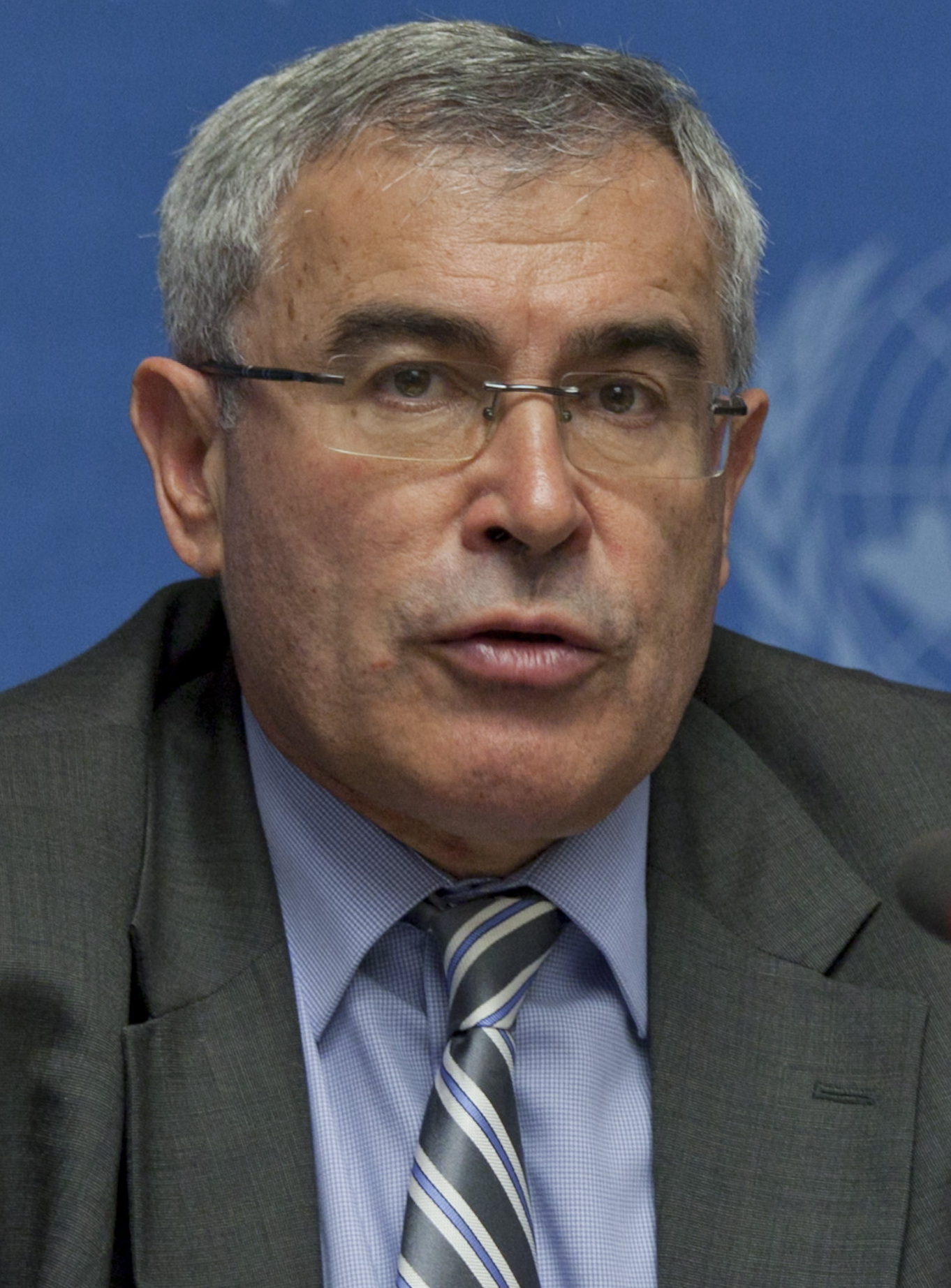
- Alkalaj in 2012

Bosnia and Herzegovina Ambassador to the United States
- Incumbent
- Assumed office 30 June 2023
- Preceded by: Bojan Vujić
- In office 23 June 1994 – 14 June 2000
- Preceded by: Office established
- Succeeded by: Igor Davidović

Permanent Representative of Bosnia and Herzegovina to the United Nations
- In office 5 July 2019 – 30 June 2023
- Preceded by: Ivica Dronjić
- Succeeded by: Zlatko Lagumdžija

Minister of Foreign Affairs
- In office 11 January 2007 – 12 January 2012
- Prime Minister: Nikola Špirić
- Preceded by: Mladen Ivanić
- Succeeded by: Zlatko Lagumdžija
Additional positions
Executive Secretary of UNECE
In office 8 March 2012 – 8 April 2014
Preceded by	Ján Kubiš
Succeeded by	Christian Friis Bach

Personal details
- Born: 11 November 1948 (age 78) Sarajevo, PR Bosnia and Herzegovina, FPR Yugoslavia
- Party: Party for Bosnia and Herzegovina
- Education: University of Sarajevo (BE, MA); University of Travnik (PhD)

Sven Alkalaj (Bosnian pronunciation: [sʋêːn âlkalaj]; born 11 November 1948) is a Bosnian diplomat who has served as Bosnia and Herzegovina's ambassador to the United States since June 2023. He previously served as the Permanent Representative of Bosnia and Herzegovina to the United Nations from 2019 to 2023. Alkalaj also served as Minister of Foreign Affairs from 2007 until 2012. He is the country's longest-serving foreign minister.

Alkalaj served as Bosnia and Herzegovina's inaugural ambassador to the United States from 1994 to 2000. He held the post of executive secretary of UNECE between 2012 and 2014 as well. He is one of the most prominent Bosnian Jews of Sephardic origin and has been a longtime member of the Party for Bosnia and Herzegovina.

== Early life and education ==
Alkalaj was born in Sarajevo on 11 November 1948 to a Sephardic Jewish father and a Bosnian Croat Catholic mother. The Alkalaj are a prominent Bosnian Jewish family, who settled in Sarajevo over 500 years ago when they fled the Spanish Inquisition. He was raised Jewish.

Alkalaj graduated in mechanical engineering from the University of Sarajevo in 1974. He returned to the university and in 1987 earned a degree in international relations and economics, with a focus on Latin America. He attended the Executive Development Program and Corporate Finance Program of Harvard University's Graduate School of Business Administration in 1999.

In 2016, Alkalaj was awarded a PhD in International Relations and International Law by the University of Travnik, with a dissertation on the "Policy of the United Nations Security Council in the Process of International Recognition and Peace-Building in Bosnia and Herzegovina (1992–2010)". He was a visiting professor at the Geneva School of Diplomacy and International Relations between 2015 and 2019, as well as an assistant professor at the University of Travnik from 2016 until 2017.

== Executive career ==
From 1975 until 1985, Alkalaj worked at Petrolinvest as a commercial manager in Sarajevo. He would later work at Energoinvest, initially as a regional manager for the Middle and Far East in Sarajevo from 1985 until 1988, and then as a managing director in Bangkok, Thailand from 1988 until 1994.

== Diplomatic career ==
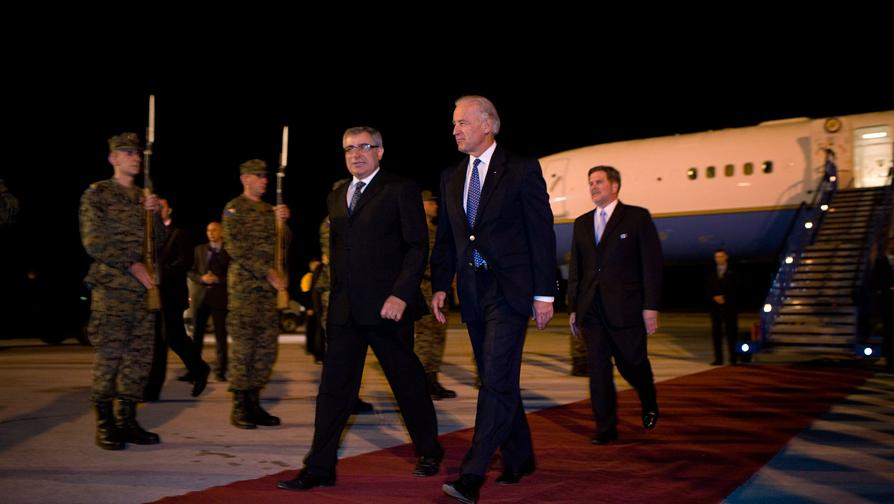
Alkalaj alongside then-U.S. Vice President Joe Biden in Sarajevo, 19 May 2009

Following the breakup of Yugoslavia and the independence of Bosnia and Herzegovina in 1992,, Alkalaj served as the first ambassador of Bosnia and Herzegovina to the United States in Washington, D.C. from 23 June 1994 until 14 June 2000. He was also accredited to the Organization of American States from 2000 to 2003.

From 2004 until 2007, Alkalaj was posted in Brussels as the ambassador of Bosnia and Herzegovina to Belgium and the Head of Mission of Bosnia and Herzegovina to the North Atlantic Treaty Organization (NATO).

From 11 January 2007 until 12 January 2012, Alkalaj served as Minister of Foreign Affairs in the first and second cabinets of Nikola Špirić, representing the Party for Bosnia and Herzegovina, then led by Haris Silajdžić. Alkalaj's resignation as minister was demanded in 2007 after it was published in Bosnian media that he had taken Croatian citizenship in 2006 based upon his mother's lineage.

From 8 March 2012 to 8 April 2014, Alkalaj was the executive secretary of the United Nations Economic Commission for Europe (UNECE) in Geneva. In July 2019, he was appointed by Bosnian Presidency member Željko Komšić as the Permanent Representative of Bosnia and Herzegovina to the United Nations in New York City. On 30 June 2023, Alkalaj presented his credentials to U.S. president Joe Biden as the newly appointed ambassador of Bosnia and Herzegovina to the United States.

== Legal issues ==
In April 2015, Alkalaj was charged by prosecutors in a case before the Court of Bosnia and Herzegovina with misconduct in his office as Minister of Foreign Affairs, related to his "signing off on a cash award of 13,418.59 KM to his then deputy Ana Trišić-Babić for her work at the Council of Ministers NATO coordination team." He was ultimately acquitted of all charges in February 2016.

Political offices
Preceded by Mladen Ivanić	Minister of Foreign Affairs; 2007–2012	Succeeded by Zlatko Lagumdžija
Diplomatic posts
Preceded by Ivica Dronjić	Permanent Representative of Bosnia and Herzegovina to the United Nations; 2019–2023	Succeeded by Zlatko Lagumdžija
