= Ministry of Foreign Affairs (Bosnia and Herzegovina) =

Government ministry of Bosnia and Herzegovina

Ministry of Foreign Affairs of Bosnia and Herzegovina
- Ministarstvo vanjskih poslova Bosne i Hercegovine; Министарство спољних послова Босне и Херцеговине

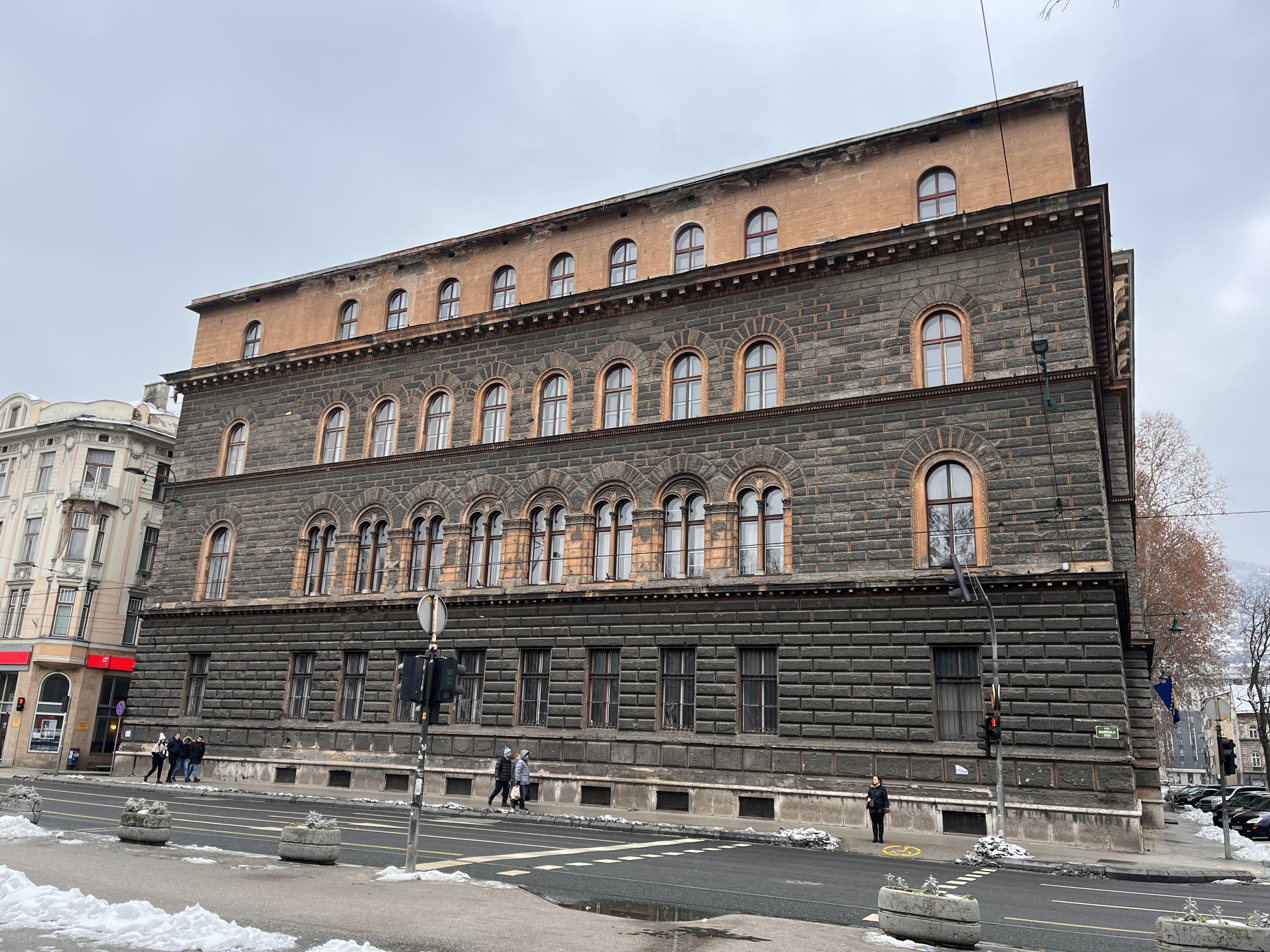
- Railways Building, seat of the Ministry of Foreign Affairs of Bosnia and Herzegovina

Department overview
- Formed: 3 January 1997; 29 years ago
- Jurisdiction: Council of Ministers
- Headquarters: Musala 2, Sarajevo
- Employees: 481 (2025)
- Annual budget: €35.2 million (2025)
- Minister responsible: Elmedin Konaković
- Website: http://mvp.gov.ba/

The Ministry of Foreign Affairs of Bosnia and Herzegovina (Bosnian/Croatian: Ministarstvo vanjskih poslova Bosne i Hercegovine, Serbian: Министарство спољних послова) is the governmental department in the Council of Ministers which oversees the foreign relations of Bosnia and Herzegovina and its diplomatic missions.

== List of ministers ==
=== Ministers of Foreign Affairs of the Republic of Bosnia and Herzegovina (1990–1996) ===
Political parties:
Party of Democratic Action (SDA)

No.	Portrait	Minister	Term start	Term end	Party
1		Haris Silajdžić	20 December 1990	30 October 1993	SDA
2		Irfan Ljubijankić	30 October 1993	28 May 1995	SDA
3		Muhamed Šaćirbegović	3 June 1995	30 January 1996	SDA

=== Ministers of Foreign Affairs of Bosnia and Herzegovina (1997–present) ===
Political parties:
Croatian Democratic Union (HDZ BiH)
Social Democratic Party (SDP BiH)
Party of Democratic Progress (PDP)
Party for Bosnia and Herzegovina (SBiH)
Party of Democratic Action (SDA)
People and Justice (NiP)

No.	Portrait	Minister	Term start	Term end	Party
1		Jadranko Prlić	3 January 1997	22 February 2001	HDZ BiH
2		Zlatko Lagumdžija	22 February 2001	23 December 2002	SDP BiH
3		Mladen Ivanić	23 December 2002	11 January 2007	PDP
4		Sven Alkalaj	11 January 2007	12 January 2012	SBiH
(2)		Zlatko Lagumdžija	12 January 2012	31 March 2015	SDP BiH
5		Igor Crnadak	31 March 2015	23 December 2019	PDP
6		Bisera Turković	23 December 2019	25 January 2023	SDA
7		Elmedin Konaković	25 January 2023	Incumbent	NiP

Source: Rulers.org

== See also ==
- Foreign relations of Bosnia and Herzegovina
