= Queens and Kings =

Studio album by Fanfare Ciocărlia
- Released: 2007
- Recorded: Headroom Studio, Berlin, Germany
- Genre: Balkan brass
- Length: 48:45
- Label: Asphalt Tango Records
- Producers: Henry Ernst; Helmut Neumann; Marc Elsner

Fanfare Ciocărlia chronology
Gili Garabdi (2005)	Queens and Kings (2007)

Professional ratings
Review scores
Source	Rating
AllMusic	4/5 stars
Robert Christgau	A
The Guardian	4/5 stars

Queens and Kings is the fifth album released by Romanian twelve-piece Roma brass band Fanfare Ciocărlia. The album was recorded and mixed at Headroom Studio, Berlin, Germany. The producers are Henry Ernst, Helmut Neumann and Marc Elsner. The album was released in 2007 by Asphalt Tango Records.

== Track listing ==
1. Kan Marau La (Dan Armeanca) — 4:31
2. Que Dolor (Kaloome) — 3:55
3. Sandala (Šaban Bajramović) — 2:49
4. Pănă Cănd Nu Te Iubeam (Mitsou) — 4:06
5. Cuando Tu Volveras (Kaloome) — 4:30
6. Duj Duj (Mitsou & Florentina Sandu) — 3:56
7. Ibrahim (Esma Redžepova) — 3:05
8. Ma Maren Ma (Šaban Bajramović) — 3:50
9. Mukav Tu (Florentina Sandu) — 2:09
10. Nakelavishe (Esma Redžepova) — 2:58
11. Ma Rov (Ljiljana Buttler) — 4:38
12. Mig Mig (Jony Iliev) — 3:19
13. Farewell March (Ioan Ivancea) — 1:36
14. Born to Be Wild — 3:11
