= Baro Biao =

Studio album by Fanfare Ciocărlia
- Released: 1999
- Recorded: Studio Electrocord; Bucharest, Romania
- Genre: Balkan Brass Band
- Length: 59:05
- Label: Piranha Musik
- Producers: Henry Ernst; Helmut Neumann

Fanfare Ciocărlia chronology
Radio Paşcani (1998)	Baro Biao (1999)	Iag Bari (2001)

Professional ratings
Review scores
Source	Rating
Allmusic	3/5 stars

Baro Biao - World Wide Wedding is the second album released by Romanian twelve-piece Roma brass band Fanfare Ciocărlia. The album was recorded 1999 at Studio Electrocord in Bucharest, Romania, and mixed at Powerplay in Berlin, Germany. Producers are Henry Ernst and Helmut Neumann. The album was released 1999 by Piranha Musik.

== Track listing ==
1. Asfalt Tango — 6:09
2. Manuela Oh Manuela — 4:02
3. Sîrba de la laşi — 1:37
4. Hora de la monastirea — 1:44
5. Mariana — 3:18
6. Manea cu voca — 4:34
7. Mr. Lobaloba — 2:17
8. Ţiganeasca — 1:54
9. Doina şi cîntec — 3:19
10. Hora lui Pusac — 1:21
11. Hai Romale! — 1:50
12. Piece de Tariţa — 2:59
13. Lume, lume şi Hora — 6:49
14. Balaşeanca de 8 ore — 2:27
15. Sîrba fluierate — 2:29
16. Manea ţiganilor — 3:04
17. Casablanca — 2:35
18. Baro Biao (Paşcani Wedding) — 5:30
