= Maciej Cieplucha =

Polish figure skater (born 1988)

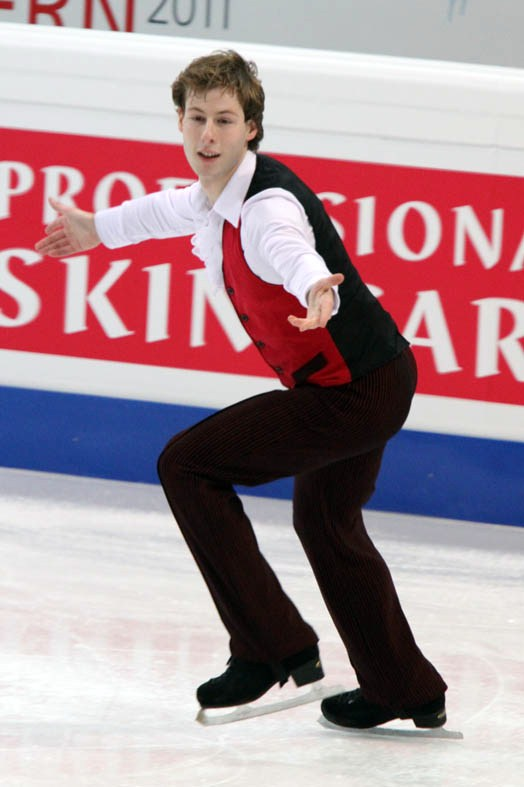
- Cieplucha in 2011

Personal information
- Born: 3 August 1988 (age 38) Łódź, Poland
- Height: 1.75 m (5 ft 9 in)

Figure skating career
- Country: Poland
- Discipline: Men's singles
- Coach: Scott Davis, Jeff Langdon
- Skating club: LTF Łódź
- Began skating: 1993

Medal record
Polish Championships
Gold medal – first place	2010 Cieszyn	Singles
Gold medal – first place	2012 Ostrava	Singles
Gold medal – first place	2014 Bratislava	Singles
Silver medal – second place	2011 Žilina	Singles
Bronze medal – third place	2008 Oświęcim	Singles

Maciej Cieplucha (Polish pronunciation: [ˈmat͡ɕɛj t͡ɕɛˈpluxa]; born 3 August 1988) is a Polish former competitive figure skater. He is the 2011 Finlandia Trophy bronze medalist, a two-time Warsaw Cup bronze medalist, and a three-time Polish national champion (2010, 2012, 2014). He has qualified three times for the free skate at the European Championships—in 2012, 2013, and 2014.

== Career ==
Cieplucha began competing on the ISU Junior Grand Prix series in 2003. He won the Polish national junior title in the 2004–05 season. In 2006–07, Cieplucha made his international senior debut at the 2006 Karl Schäfer Memorial and also appeared as a senior at the Polish Championships, but competed mostly on the junior level internationally until the end of the 2007–08 season. He competed twice at the World Junior Championships, finishing 20th in 2007 and 24th in 2008.

In the 2009–10 season, Cieplucha won the Polish national senior title for the first time and was given his European Championship debut. He missed qualifying for the free skate by one spot. He was also assigned to his first senior World Championships and finished 35th.

Cieplucha trained in Łódź, Poland with coaches Włodzimierz Brajczewski and Mirosława Brajczewska until July 2010 when he moved to Calgary, Alberta to be coached by Scott Davis and Jeff Langdon. In Canada, he trained at the Calalta Figure Skating Club.

Cieplucha qualified for the free skate at the 2012 European Championships and again at the 2013 European Championships but was one spot away from reaching the free skate at both the 2013 World Championships and 2014 World Championships.

In the 2013–14 season, Cieplucha placed 11th at the 2013 Nebelhorn Trophy, an Olympic qualifier, and became the first alternate for the men's event at the 2014 Winter Olympics. At the 2014 European Championships in Budapest, he achieved a personal best short program score, 65.84 points, and qualified for the free skate.

== Programs ==
Season	Short program	Free skating
2013–2014	The Barber of Seville by Gioachino Rossini choreo. by Mark Pillay	Ragtime (soundtrack) choreo. by Tom Dickson
2012–2013	Blues	Cinema Paradiso by Ennio Morricone
2011–2012	Foxtrot by Fanfare Ciocărlia; Dusty Road; Moliendo Cafe from Iag Bari by Fanfare Ciocărlia	Brazil (1985 film) by Michael Kamen; The Morning After; Truck Drive; Central Services; Escape No Escape
2010–2011	For Lisa (adaptation of "Für Elise" by Ludwig van Beethoven)	Spartacus by Aram Khachaturian
2009–2010	El Tango de Roxanne (from Moulin Rouge!)	Passion (from The Last Temptation of Christ) by Peter Gabriel
2006–2008	Smuga Cienia by Wojciech Kilar	Scott and Fran's Paso Doble (from Strictly Ballroom) by David Hirschfelder; Gypsy Flame by Armik; Scott and Fran's Paso Doble

== Competitive highlights ==
JGP: Junior Grand Prix

Event	03–04	04–05	05–06	06–07	07–08	08–09	09–10	10–11	11–12	12–13	13–14
World Championships							35th		25th	25th	22nd
European Championships							21st	25th	19th	19th	19th
Polish Championships		1st J	2nd J	4th	3rd		1st	2nd	1st		1st
Four Nationals Championships							3rd	5th	3rd		3rd
Challenge Cup						6th					
Finlandia Trophy						10th		9th	3rd		7th
Golden Spin of Zagreb								6th	6th		
Karl Schäfer Memorial				16th							
Nebelhorn Trophy						19th	10th	10th		17th	11th
Nepela Memorial							4th		10th		
Warsaw Cup										3rd	3rd
World Junior Championships				20th	24th						
JGP Andorra			9th								
JGP Austria					16th						
JGP Croatia			15th								
JGP Czech Republic	23rd										
JGP Germany					11th						
JGP Netherlands				14th							
JGP Poland	20th										
JGP Romania				12th							
Copenhagen Trophy			1st J								
European Youth Olympic Festival			9th J								
Warsaw Cup	7th J		1st J								
