= Onwards to Mars! =

Studio album by Fanfare Ciocărlia
- Released: 15 April 2016
- Recorded: UNDA Recording, Bucharest, Romania / Popschutz Studio, Berlin, Germany / Merlin Producciones, Medellín, Colombia
- Genre: Balkan brass
- Length: 44:45
- Label: Asphalt Tango Records
- Producer: Henry Ernst

Fanfare Ciocărlia chronology
Devil's Tale	Onwards to Mars!	20

Onwards to Mars! is Fanfare Ciocărlia's eighth studio album. It was produced by Henry Ernst and Marc Elsner across 2015 and 2016 and released on 15 April 2016. The bulk of the album was recorded at UNDA Recording studio in Bucharest, Romania. Additional recording was done at Popschutz Studio in Berlin, Germany, Merlin Producciones in Medellín, Colombia, and Fanfare Ciocărlia's home village of Zece Prajini, Romania. The London-based Israeli musician Koby Israelite wrote seven of the fourteen tracks on the album specifically for Fanfare Ciocărlia. Other tracks include traditional Romanian folk songs, Screaming Jay Hawkins' "I Put a Spell on You" (with guest vocalist Iulian Canaf singing) and the cumbia-influenced "Fiesta de Negritos". Fanfare Ciocărlia recorded the latter in Medellín with Puerto Candelaria.

== Recording ==
Fanfare Ciocărlia's previous two albums - Balkan Brass Battle and Devil's Tale - had both been collaborations. For Onwards to Mars!, as they were about to celebrate their 20th anniversary as a band, Fanfare Ciocărlia decided to return to their roots and record a straight ahead, high energy album of Balkan brass. To ensure they had fresh material to record they called on Koby Israelite, who also records for Asphalt Tango, for compositions. Deciding to record "I Put a Spell on You" they called on Iulian Canaf, a Romanian Roma vocalist who is noted for singing blues songs. Touring Colombia the band found their sound worked well with many of the local cumbia artists playing brass lead dance music so entered the studio in Medellín with local cumbia band Puerto Candelaria to record what would become Onwards to Mars! closing track, "Fiesta de Negritos". This worked so well that a video was shot of Fanfare Ciocărlia performing the song in Colombia.

Onwards to Mars!' cover is designed by Paul Hitter, a Romanian Roma painter who now lives in Los Angeles and creates colourful paintings that portray different aspects of Gypsy life.

== Critical reception ==
Professional ratings
Review scores
Source	Rating
All About Jazz	4.5/5 stars
The Guardian	4/5 stars
The Independent	4/5 stars
Record Collector	3/5 stars

In All About Jazz's review of Onwards to Mars! Bruce Lindsey wrote, "One of the finest live acts on Earth, the band's energy, musicality and sheer unfettered sense of fun readily translate to record, making this album one of the most uplifting and cheerful collections one could wish to hear". In The Guardian, Robin Denselow wrote that "the Fanfare team are still expanding the range of their classy musicianship without forgetting their roots". Andy Gill of The Independent said, "There’s an appealing balance between ancient and modern, serious and comic in their work, with wry nods to outside influences evident in titles like "Mista Lobaloba" and "Out to Lounge", but nothing allowed to taint the urgent virtuosity of their Balkan jazz. Tracks such as "Trenul, Masina Mica", "3 Romanians" and "Fiesta de Negritos" emphasise the pronounced offbeat that Balkan music shares with reggae and cumbia, producing a highly infectious, insidious shuffle guaranteed to start any party." Record Collector's Kris Needs noted the group's embracing of cumbia music and said, "While managing to bottle their incendiary live abandon, the band also make sure to homage their home country with traditional Romanian outings and their heartfelt brand of blues"."

=== Accolades ===
At Songlines magazine 2017 awards for best albums from the previous year Onwards to Mars! won the award for Best Europe Album.

== Track listing ==
1. "Crayfish Hora" – 2:55
2. "Mista Lobaloba" – 3:10
3. "3 Romanians" – 3:20
4. "Trenul, masina mica" – 4:34
5. "Out to Lounge" – 2:56
6. "I Put a Spell on You" (featuring Iulian Canaf) – 2:29
7. "Cucuritza" – 2:21
8. "Doina pentru o inima frant" – 2:16
9. "Bunica bate toba" – 4:29
10. "Saintes & Dates" – 3:47
11. "Un tigan avea o casa" – 3:33
12. "The Patrons Funeral" – 2:12
13. "Hora Strengarilor" – 2:09
14. "Fiesta de Negritos" (featuring Puerto Candelaria) – 3:44
