= Iag Bari =

Studio album by Fanfare Ciocărlia
- Released: 2001
- Recorded: Studio Electrocord; Bucharest, Romania
- Genre: Balkan Brass Band
- Length: 54:02
- Label: Piranha Musik
- Producers: Henry Ernst; Helmut Neumann

Fanfare Ciocărlia chronology
Baro Biao (1999)	Iag Bari (2001)	Gili Garabdi (2005)

Professional ratings
Review scores
Source	Rating
Allmusic	4/5 stars

Iag Bari - The Gypsy Horns From The Mountains Beyond is the third album released by Romanian twelve-piece Roma brass band Fanfare Ciocărlia. The album was recorded May 2001 at Studio Electrocord in Bucharest, Romania, and mixed at UFO-Sound Studios in Berlin, Germany. Producers are Henry Ernst and Helmut Neumann. The album was released 2001 by Piranha Musik.

== Track listing ==
1. Doina (Westside Blues) — 2:27
2. Wild Silence — 0:37
3. Iag Bari (The Big Longing) — 4:34
4. Dusty Road — 2:24
5. Lume, lume (World, World) — 2:53
6. Jocul Boldenilor — 2:19
7. Hora din Petrosnitza — 1:57
8. Banatzeana — 1:24
9. Tu Romnie (Don't Go Away) — 3:34
10. Moliendo Café — 2:27
11. Balada lui Ioan — 3:27
12. Besh o Drom (Keep On Walking) — 5:56
13. Hora Andalusia — 3:40
14. Hurichestra — 3:29
15. So te kerau? (What Shall I Do?) — 3:51
16. Hora lautareasca — 2:41
17. Ginduri de om batrin (Old Man Thinking) — 4:14
18. Bubamara — 1:58
19. Manea du voca — (video) 2:41
