= Medunjanin =

Medunjanin is a Bosnian surname. Notable people with the surname include:

- Adis Medunjanin, Bosnian-American convicted terrorist and associate of Najibullah Zazi
- Amira Medunjanin (born 1972), Bosnian singer
- Haris Medunjanin (born 1985), Bosnian professional footballer
