= Trumpets' Republic =

Trumpets’ Republic
- Directed by: Stefano Missio
- Written by: Alessandro Gori
- Produced by: Stefano Missio, Alessandro Gori
- Edited by: Marco Perez
- Release date: 20 January 2006 (Trieste Film Festival)
- Running time: 48 minutes
- Country: Italy
- Language: Serbian

Trumpets’ Republic (Serbian Cyrillic: Трубачка Република) is a documentary film directed by Stefano Missio.

== Synopsis ==
This is a film documentary on Serbia, and the horns and brass.

In Serbia trumpets play in the popular feasts where people dance and sing, but they also play in funerals: trumpet music accompanies the deceased also in his last trip. Not surprisingly, the trumpet became an emotional part of the life of Serbian people.

== Awards ==
- It won as Special prize “for Talent” in the 2007 at “Saratov Sufferings 2007 - The International Documentary Drama Film Festival” (Russia).

== See also ==
- Balkan Brass Band
- Guča trumpet festival

== Bibliography ==
- Tom Haines, « Laughter reigns, war memories fade at annual Balkans brass festival », The Boston Globe, 2004-06-27
- Ivana Godnik, « Missio : "Così scoprimmo la Repubblica delle trombe" », Il Piccolo, 2006-01-21 .
- Alessandro Gori, « El país de las trompetas », La Vanguardia, Barcelona, suplemento 'Revista', 2006-10-01
- Lucia Sgueglia, « Un'altra Russia », Il Manifesto, 2007-12-22 p.16 p.17.
