= Dragi Šestić =

Bosnian music producer

Dragi Šestić (born 14 May 1966) is a Bosnian music producer, sound engineer, director of music video clips and record label owner. In 1998 he founded the first Bosnian World Music band, Mostar Sevdah Reunion. He rediscovered almost forgotten Gypsy music legends from ex-Yugoslavia Šaban Bajramović and Ljiljana Buttler-Petrović and brought them into the spotlight of the international World Music scene.

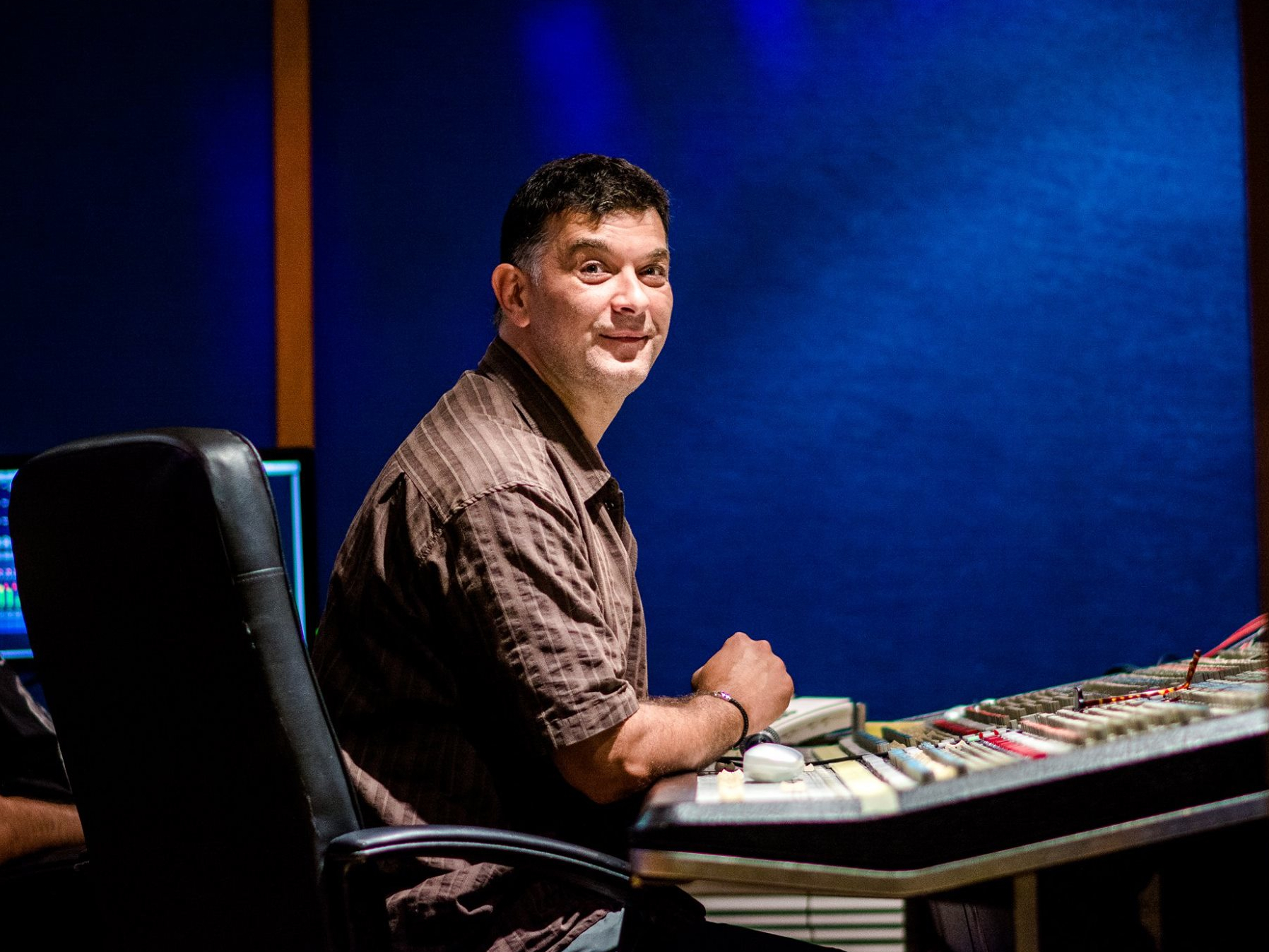
Šestić

== Life and career ==
Šestić was born in Mostar, Bosnia and Herzegovina.

He worked with the famous maqaam (Maqam al-iraqi), star - Farida Ali from Iraq on her album Ishraqaat.

His work involved many of the Balkan stars, including the Queen of Gyspies Esma Redžepova, Boban Marković, Naat Veliov, Amira Medunjanin, Fulgerica, Ljubiša Stojanović Louis, and many more. His work can be found on many World Music compilations, but most of it is on his record label Snail Records, founded in 2002. He lives and works in the Netherlands.

== Discography as a music producer ==
1. Mostar Sevdah Reunion: «Mostar Sevdah Reunion» (1999 – World Connection)
2. Mostar Sevdah Reunion presents Šaban Bajramović: «A Gypsy Legend» (2001 World Connection)
3. Ljiljana Buttler: «The Mother Of Gypsy Soul» (2002 Snail Records)
4. Fulgerica and The Mahala Gipsies: «Gypsy Music From The City Of Bucharest» (2002 World Connection)
5. Mostar Sevdah Reunion: «A Secret Gate» (2003 Snail Records)
6. Amira: «Rosa» (2004 Snail Records)
7. Branko Galoić: «Above The Roofs» (2005 Snail Records)
8. Farida: «Ishraqaat» (2005 Snail Records)
9. Mostar Sevdah Reunion and Ljiljana Buttler: «The Legends Of Life» (2005 Snail Records)
10. Mostar Sevdah Reunion and Šaban Bajramović: «Šaban» (2006 Snail Records)
11. Mostar Sevdah Reunion: «Cafe Sevdah» (2007 Snail Records)
12. Ljiljana Buttler: «Frozen Roses» (2009 Snail Records)
13. Sarr e Roma: «Sarayland» (2010 Snail Records)
14. Louis: «The Last King Of The Balkans» (2011 Snail Records)
15. Klezmofobia: «Kartushnik» (2012 Tiger Records)
16. Mostar Sevdah Reunion: «Tales From A Forgotten City» (2013 Snail Records/ World Connection)
17. Mostar Sevdah Reunion: «Kings Of Sevdah» (2016 Snail Records)
18. Klapa Reful Split: «Heart Of Dalmatia» (2017 Snail Records)
19. Mostar Sevdah Reunion presents Sreta: «The Balkan Autumn» (2018 Snail Records)
20. Marin Jerkunica: «Badija» (2019 Snail Records)
21. Mostar Sevdah Reunion: «Lady Sings The Balkan Blues» (2022 Snail Records)
22. Mostar Sevdah Reunion: «Live in Sarajevo» (2023 Snail Records)
23. Mostar Sevdah Reunion: «Bosa Mara» (2024 Snail Records)
24. Tondini plays Mostar Sevdah Reunion: «Disko 088» (2025 Snail Records)
25. New Era Quartet: «Bridge To Sevdah» (2026 Snail Records)

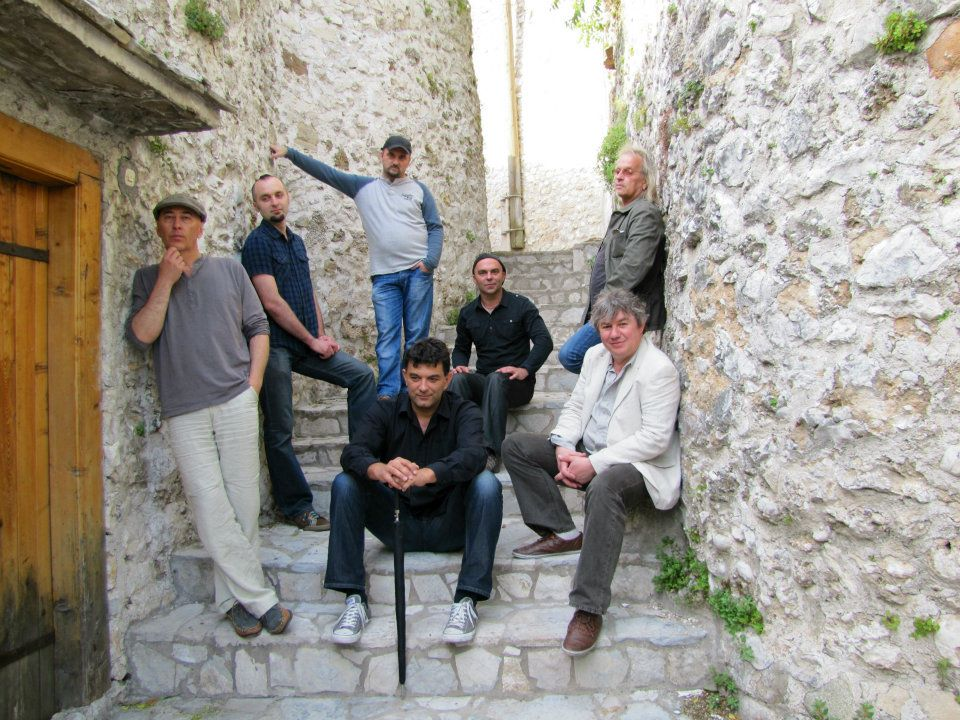
Mostar Sevdah Reunion and Dragi Šestić

== Awards ==
- "Davorin" Bosnian Music Awards: Special Award 2002.
- "Davorin" Bosnian Music Awards: The Best Ethno Album Of The Year 2003. (for "The Mother of Gypsy Soul: Ljiljana Buttler")
- "Davorin" Bosnian Music Awards: The Best Album Of The Year 2004.
- Songlines (magazine) - TOP OF THE WORLD - album Amira Medunjanin "Rosa" (May/June 2005. issue #30)
- Songlines (magazine) - TOP OF THE WORLD - album Farida Mohammad Ali "Ishraqaat" (June 2007. issue #44)
- Songlines (magazine) - TOP OF THE WORLD - album Saban Bajramovic and Mostar Sevdah Reunion "Saban" (August/September 2008. issue #54)
- Songlines (magazine) - TOP OF THE WORLD - album Ljiljana Buttler "Frozen Roses" (November/December 2009. issue #64)
- Songlines (magazine) - TOP OF THE WORLD - album Mostar Sevdah Reunion "Tales From A Forgotten City" (March 2014. issue #98)
- "Transgloba World Music Charts" Best of Europe - album Mostar Sevdah Reunion "Lady Sings The Balkan Blues" (Best of the 2022–2023. season)
- Songlines (magazine) - TOP OF THE WORLD - album Mostar Sevdah Reunion "Lady Sings The Balkan Blues" (March 2023. issue #185)
- Songlines (magazine) - Mostar Sevdah Reunion - The Best Group 2024.

== Films ==
- Mostar Sevdah Reunion by Pjer Žalica 2000
- Sevdah the Bridge that Survived by Mira Erdevički 2005
- Šaban by Miloš Stojanović 2007
- Tales from a Forgotten City by Amir Grabus 2013
- Balkan Blues - documentary film Balkan Blues: Stories from Mostar by Lucio de Candia 2016
- Hocu kuci - Al Jazeera - Doprinos domovini 2018
- Sounds that made us – Klapa by Balázs Weyer 2023
