= Guča Trumpet Festival =

Annual music festival in Serbia

Coordinates: 43°46′35″N 20°13′55″E

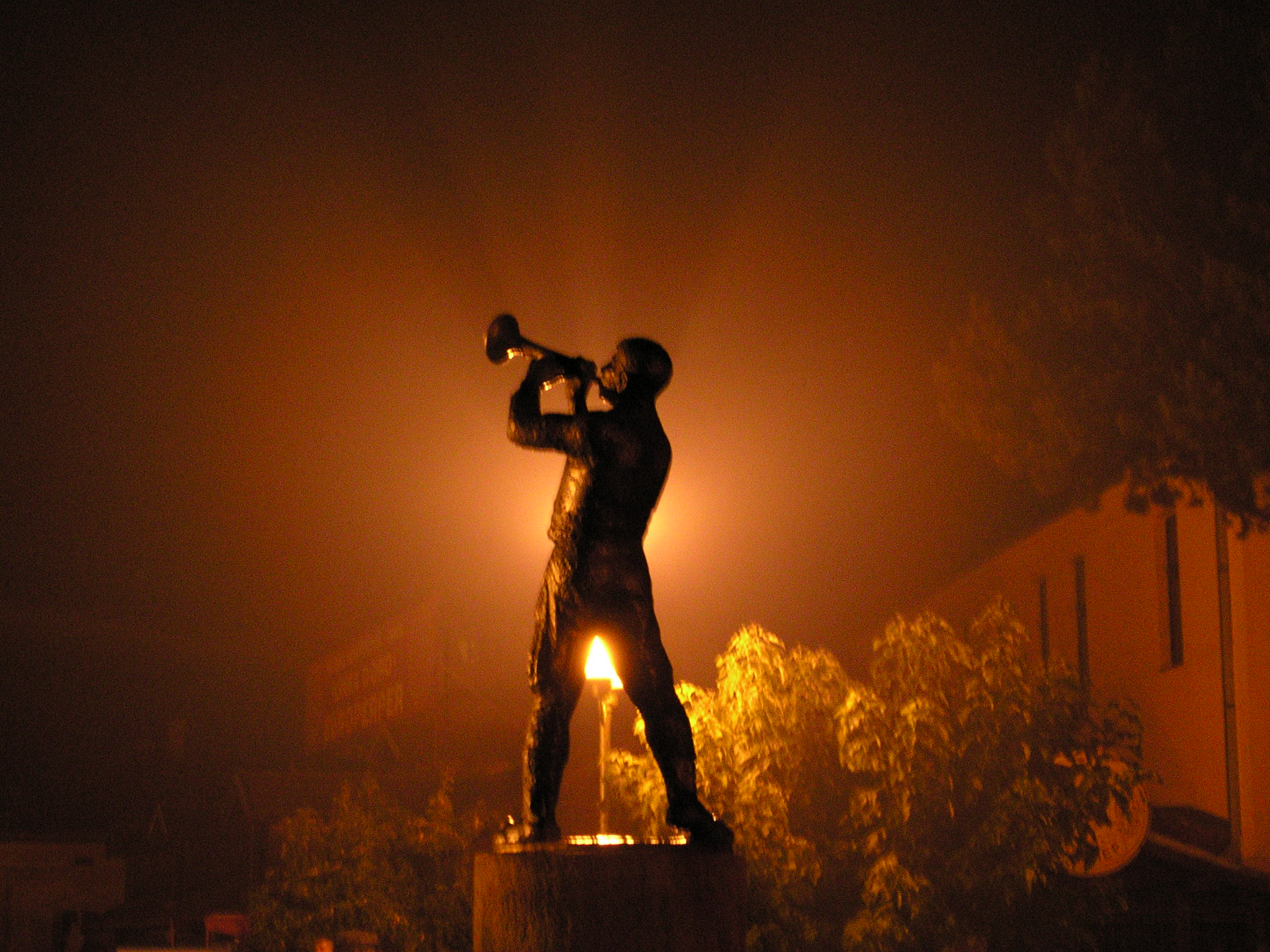
- The Guča trumpeter statue
- Locations: Guča, Serbia
- Years active: 1961–present
- Website: www.guca.rs

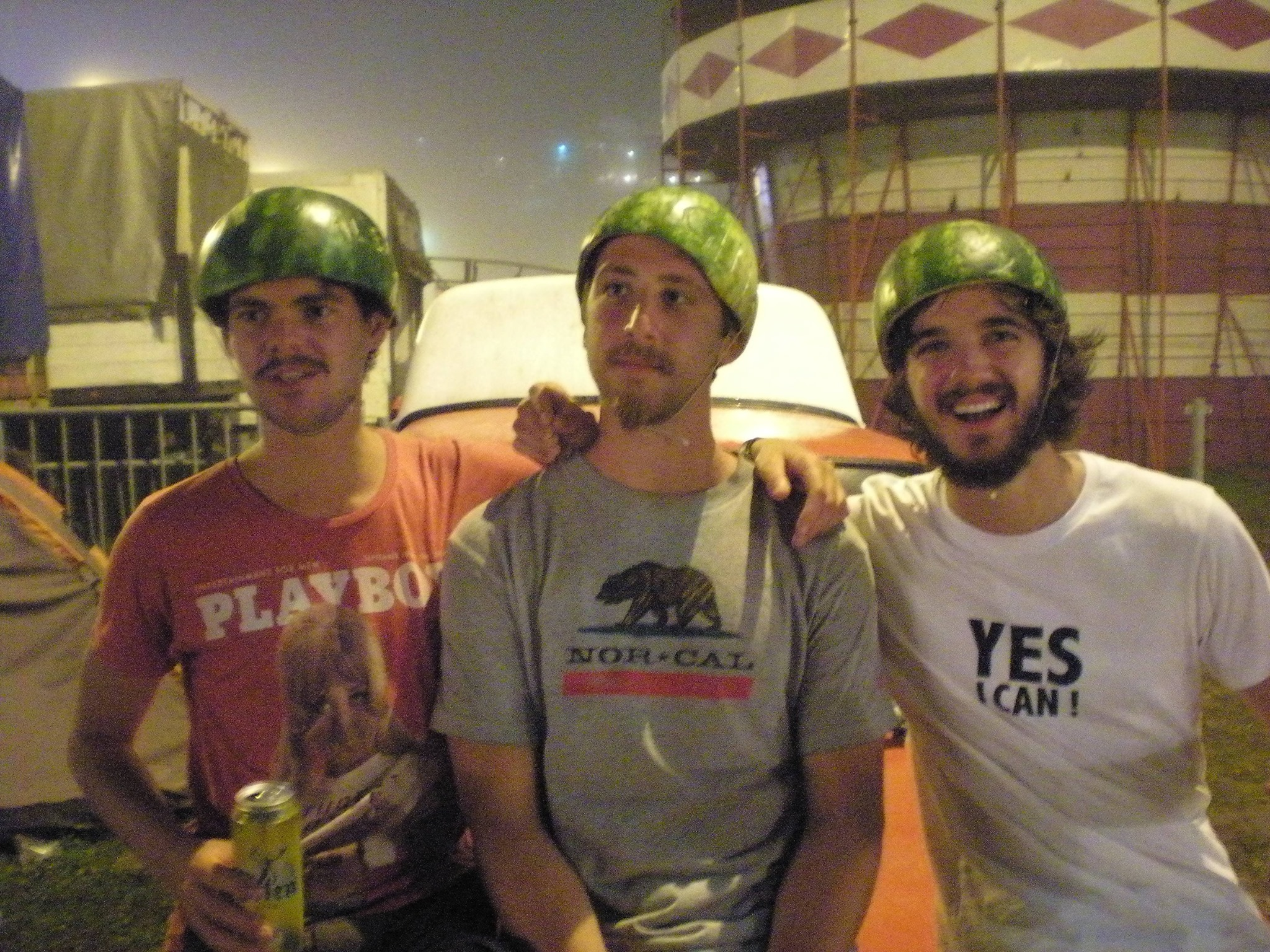
Guča Trumpet Festival visitors in 2014

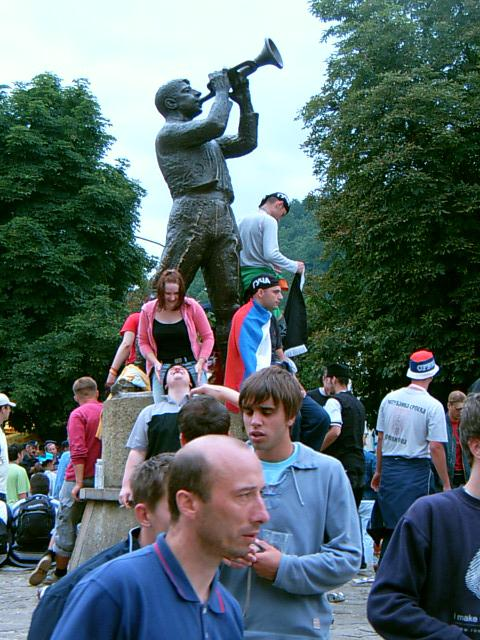
The Guča trumpeter statue

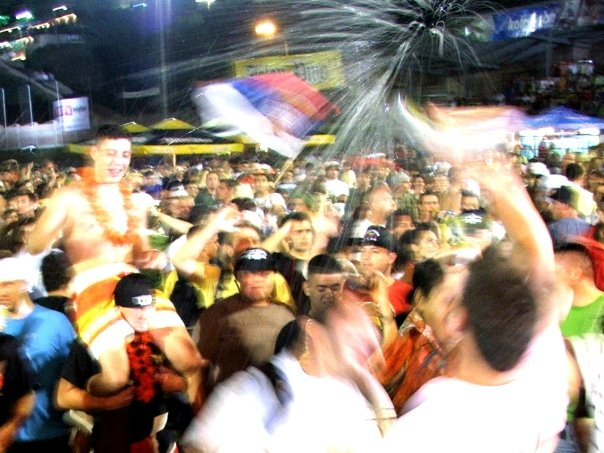
Scene from Boban Marković concert in 2008

The Guča Trumpet Festival (Serbian: Фестивал трубача у Гучи, romanized: Festival trubača u Guči), also known as the Dragačevski Sabor (Serbian: Драгачевски сабор or Dragačevo Fair (Fete, Gathering or Assembly), pronounced [draɡǎːtʃeʋskiː sǎːbor]), is an annual Balkan brass band festival and competition held in the town of Guča, in the Dragačevo region and Lučani municipality of Serbia.

The festival takes place from Friday to Sunday in early August and includes an opening concert on Friday night, celebrations on Saturday night and a competition on Sunday. The opening concert on Friday includes previous competition winners, each band getting to play three tunes while folk dancers in traditional dress dance kolos and oros. The song Sa Ovčara i Kablara marks the beginning of the festival each year. Apart from the regular brass orchestras, the competition also includes the children and youth orchestras. Elimination heats are held earlier in the year and only a few dozen bands qualify to compete. The competitors are in the most part self-taught. They play by ear and quite spontaneously, relying on their musical memory. Notable regular performers at the festival include Boban Marković, Goran Bregović, Fejat Sejdić, Fanfare Ciocărlia, and Shantel.

Since the festival is free, there is no official count of the number of attendees; however, many publications estimate it to be hundreds of thousands of people per day. It is estimated that from 1961 to 2017, the festival had 16 million visitors. Patrons provide gratuities to bands who play on the street. The festival is popular with foreigners as well as locals, many of whom have never been abroad. The festival is also characterized by many stalls selling beer and local foods, including many pig roasts. Free camping as well as paid showers are provided for attendees. The festival has also been the subject of several documentaries and films.

== History ==
The idea for the festival came from Blagoje Radivojević (1925–2016), a reporter working for Politika. He was correspondent from Čačak, where in 1961 he noticed a band of trumpeters, playing the farewell to the brigade of the youth work actions at Čačak's railway station. He suggested to the local administration in the Lučani municipality, to add the trumpeters, as the "special musical heritage of this part of Serbia", to the already existing festival "Dragačevo through sing and dance". The suggestion evolved into the separate trumpet festival. Radivojević, with the help of author Branko V. Radičević was able to urge politician and former intelligence officer Slobodan Penezić Krcun to allow the festival, but warned: "all right, but I don't want to hear about any Serbian nationalism there" (dobro, ali nemoj da čujem da je bilo nekakvog srbovanja).

The inaugural festival was held on 16 October 1961 in the churchyard of the Church of St. Michael and St. Gabriel in Guča, with 4 orchestras from the neighboring villages competing. The winner was Desimir Perišić (1919–1983), who is, still the only local musician who won the competition. He was nicknamed "Dragačevo's Harry James". On 10 August 2010, a monument to Perišić was dedicated on the new roundabout at the entrance into Guča from Lučani direction. At the first festival, each band had to play five songs. Two obligatory were Sa Ovčara i Kablara and Bledi mesec zagrlio zvezdu danicu, plus two kolos and a march by choice.

By 2017, it grew into the largest trumpet festival, third ethno-festival and one of the 15 largest festivals in the world. In Serbia, it gained a reputation of an unofficial state celebration.

== Notable festivals ==
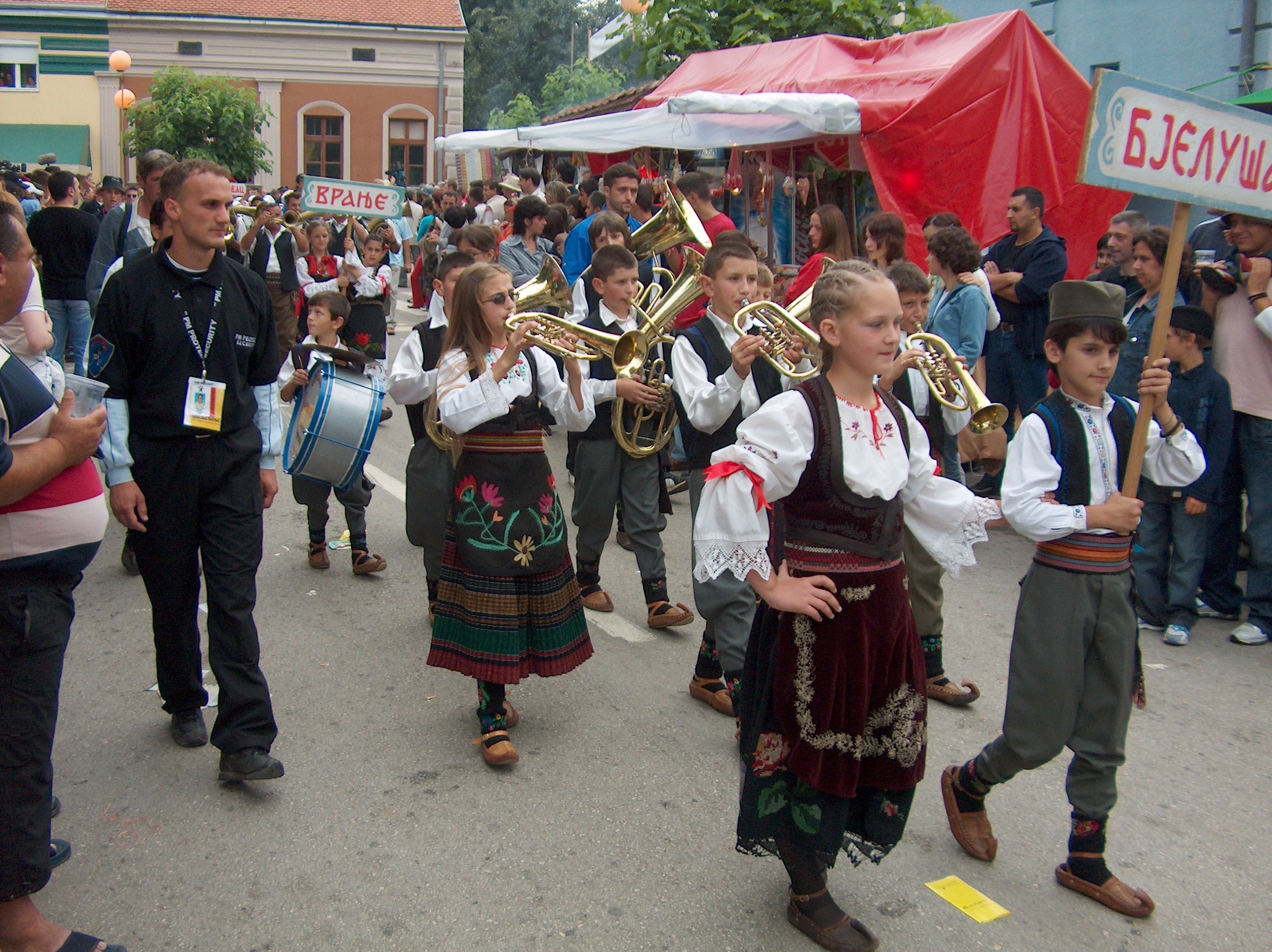
Orkestar Danijela playing at the Guča trumpet parade in August 2005.

- 1961 - The first festival; only 4 bands competed and 2,500 people attended.
- 2001 - The first time ever that a musician, Boban Marković, got the highest mark from every jury member. Since then, Boban decided not to compete any more. Instead he performs three or four songs as a special guest at each festival thereafter. Attending the competition in 2001, among other dignitaries, were Princess Katherine of Yugoslavia (from the line of Black George, to whose uprising the music can be traced), and Zoran Đinđić, the prime minister.
- 2005 - Attendees consumed three tons of bread, 50 lorry loads of cabbage, a 250,000 servings of meat and 3 million litres of beer.
- 2006 - The majority of the 1,500 performers in the 46th festival were Romani people from around the region. Novi Sad Brewery, the main sponsor of the 2006 festival, reported beer sales of 4,000 hectoliters, or more than 700,000 British pints. Prime Minister Vojislav Koštunica attended the last day of the festival.
- 2007 - Goran Bregović performed at the festival.
- 2009 - A United States Navy orchestra participated in the event.
- 2010 - The 50th edition of the festival was a 10-day festival opened by the then President of Serbia Boris Tadić. It achieved the record attendance of about 700,000.
- 2020 - The festival was cancelled due to the COVID-19 pandemic, the first cancellation in its history.
- 2024 - The festival was attended by an estimated 150,000 visitors per day.
- 2026 - Former Hungarian prime minister Viktor Orbán attended the festival.

== Winners ==
In time, four awards distinguished themselves as the most important. In the descending order of importance, they are: best orchestra, first trumpet, folk playing (all awarded by the jury) and Golden trumpet (voted by the audience). Every performer with three wins in any of the categories is being declared a "master of trumpet". The rules were amended in 2017, so now two of those three wins have to be awards given by the jury. This was done as some very young players won several audience awards due to their popularity. Milovan Babić is considered the most successful performer at the festival, with 11 wins in all four categories from 1972 to 2003. Based on points (awarding 4, 3, 2 and 1 point according to the importance of the award), the list of the most successful trumpeters for the 1961-2018 period is:

1. 32 points - Fejat Sejdić (1941–2017) ("The master of Guča for all times")
2. 28 points - Milovan Babić (1950)
3. 27 points - Slobodan Salijević (1965)
4. 25 points - Bakija Bakić (1923–89)
5. 24 points - Raka Kostić (1927–94)
6. 22 points - Svetozar Lazović (1952)
7. 21 points - Boban Marković (1964)
8. 21 points - Milovan Petrović (????)
9. 20 points - Dejan Petrović (1985; son of Milovan)
10. 18 points - Ekrem Mamutović sr (1942–2008; later changed name to Milan Mladenović)

== Documentaries about the festival ==
- Brasslands – a documentary film by the Meerkat Media Collective shot at the 50th anniversary of the Guča trumpet competition
- Guca Film – documentary filmed in Guča, following two young contenders for the coveted 'Golden Trumpet' award.
- Trumpets' Republic — A documentary film by Stefano Missio & Alessandro Gori
