= Jeni Jol =

Jeni Jol is a Rom folk dance from the region of Skopje, Macedonia.

It is a woman's line dance, in 2/4 meter, with a walking rhythm, with sensuous hip tilts. The dancers form a curved line, holding hands, and the dance moves to the dancer's right. The step pattern is 6 measures long. The dance is in the čoček musical genre that developed in the Balkans from Ottoman military bands in the 19th century, and is done to slow Rom brass band music, particularly the song Rumelaj. The name of the group means "new road".

== See also ==
- Music of the Republic of Macedonia
