= Devil's Tale =

Studio album by Fanfare Ciocărlia and Adrian Raso
- Released: 2014
- Recorded: Metalworks Studio, Toronto, Canada
- Genre: Balkan brass
- Length: 40:56
- Label: Asphalt Tango Records
- Producers: Henry Ernst, Marc Elsner, Adrian Raso

Fanfare Ciocărlia and Adrian Raso chronology
| Onwards to Mars! | Devil's Tale | Balkan Brass Battle |

Professional ratings
Review scores
| Source | Rating |
|---|---|
| AllMusic | 4.5/5 stars |

Devil's Tale is Fanfare Ciocărlia's seventh studio album. It is a collaboration with the Canadian guitarist Adrian Raso and the bulk of the album was recorded with Raso at Metalworks Studio, Toronto, Canada (overdubs were later done in Mexico, Germany and in Zece Prajini - the Romanian village that Fanfare Ciocărlia hail from). The album was co-produced by Henry Ernst (from Asphalt Tango Records) and Marc Elsner. One track was produced by Adrian Raso.

== Overview ==
Devil's Tale marks the first time Fanfare Ciocărlia have collaborated in the studio with a non-Balkan musician and the album's sound is substantially different from their previous albums. Guitarist Adrian Raso composed and arranged all 12 tracks and his guitar playing is the lead instrument across the album with Fanfare Ciocărlia's brass instruments and percussion serving as backing. Raso's background is in Gypsy jazz and hard rock and across Devil's Tale he demonstrates a fluid, lyrical technique that Fanfare Ciocărlia back with jaunty horn arrangements.

Guests on the album are guitarists John Jorgenson and Rodrigo (of Rodrigo & Gabriela), rock drummer Kevin Figueiredo (of Extreme), Kai Schonburg (drums and percussion), Florin Ionita (accordion), Marc Elsner (electric bass) and Michael Metzler (Jew's harp).

== Reviews ==
Devil's Tale is a slower, gentler, more melodic album than previous Fanfare Ciocărlia efforts. The interplay of guitar and horns created an atmospheric, instrumental album that touches on jazz and surf music while retaining a Balkan brass character. Devil's Tale was well received internationally with The New York Music Daily writing, "Devil's Tale is in many respects as noir as noir gets" while in the UK Neil Spencer in The Observer wrote, "the 12-piece band are splendidly restrained, swelling gently behind waltzes, contributing accordion and clarinet and only occasionally ripping into their trademark supercharged intricacy. All instrumental and all delightful."

Upon Devil's Tale's release, Adrian Raso toured Europe with Fanfare Ciocărlia.

== Track listing ==
1. Urn St. Tavern - 4:06
2. Swing Sagarese - 3:10
3. The Absinthe-Minded Gypsy - 4:28
4. C'est La Vie - 2:46
5. Quattro Cicci - 2:40
6. Charlatan's Waltz - 2:54
7. Devil's Tale - 2:53
8. Leezard's Lament - 3:11
9. Cafe Con Leche - 3:15
10. Spiritissimo - 3:36
11. Bireli's Waltz - 3:48
12. Django - 4:07

== See also ==
- Fanfare Ciocarlia
