= Balkan Brass Battle =

Studio album by Fanfare Ciocărlia and Boban & Marko Marković Orchestra
- Released: 2011
- Recorded: Pensiune Dracula, Căpăținenii, Romania
- Genre: Balkan Brass Band
- Length: 46:15
- Label: Asphalt Tango Records
- Producers: Henry Ernst, Marc Elsner

Fanfare Ciocărlia and Boban & Marko Marković Orchestra chronology
Best of Gypsy Brass (2009)	Balkan Brass Battle (2011)	Devil's Tale (2011)

Professional ratings
Review scores
Source	Rating
AllMusic	5/5 stars

Balkan Brass Battle is Fanfare Ciocărlia's sixth studio album. It is a collaboration with the Serbian brass band, Boban & Marko Marković Orchestra. Balkan Brass Battle was recorded in Pensiune Dracula (a hotel complex) in northern Romania in March 2011.

== Track listing ==
1. Battle Call - 00:36
2. Mrak Kolo (Boban & Marko Marković Orchestra) - 04:21
3. Suita a la Ciobanas (Fanfare Ciocărlia) - 04:13
4. James Bond Theme (Boban & Marko Marković Orchestra vs. Fanfare Ciocărlia) - 04:11
5. Caravan (Fanfare Ciocărlia) - 03:34
6. Caravan (Boban & Marko Marković Orchestra) - 03:18
7. Devla (Boban & Marko Marković Orchestra vs. Fanfare Ciocărlia) - 04:07
8. Topdzijsko Kolo (Boban & Marko Marković Orchestra) - 03:05
9. Dances from the monastery hills (Fanfare Ciocărlia) - 02:57
10. Disco Dzumbus (Boban & Marko Marković Orchestra vs. Fanfare Ciocărlia) - 03:26
11. I am your Gummy Bear (Fanfare Ciocărlia) - 03:12
12. Otpisani (Boban & Marko Marković Orchestra) - 04:00
13. Asfalt Tango (Boban & Marko Marković Orchestra vs. Fanfare Ciocărlia) - 05:14
