= Amira Medunjanin =

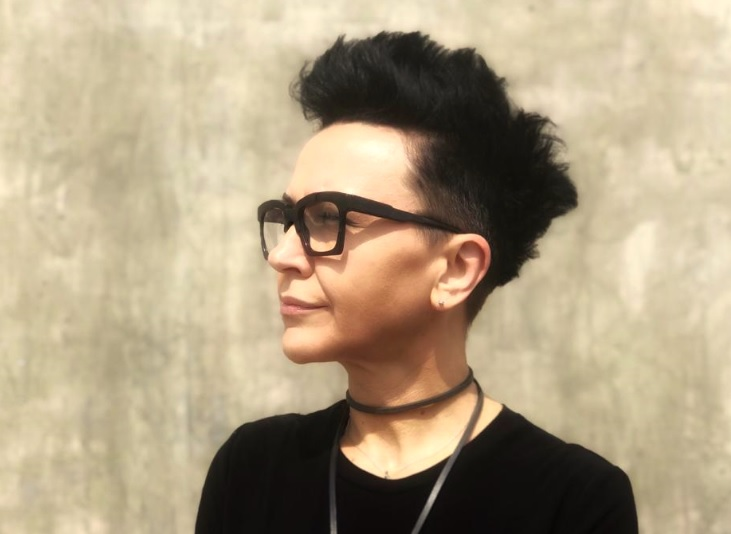

Background information
- Birth name: Amira Dedić
- Born: 23 April 1972 (age 53); Sarajevo, SR Bosnia and Herzegovina, SFR Yugoslavia
- Genres: World; sevdalinka
- Years active: 2003–present
- Labels: Snail Records; Gramofon; Harmonia Mundi; Aquarius; Town Hill Colony; Croatia
- Website: www.amiramedunjanin.com

Amira Medunjanin (née Dedić; born 23 April 1972) is a Bosnian singer and interpreter of sevdalinka. She holds both citizenship of Croatia and Bosnia and Herzegovina.

== Biography ==
Medunjanin was born in Sarajevo and her fascination with the Music of Bosnia and Herzegovina led her to devote herself to creating a unique voice within sevdalinka.

Singer, humanitarian, and global ambassador for both the culture and music of her native Bosnia and Herzegovina and the wider Balkan region, Medunjanin has been described as "one of the great voices of her generation" (The Observer) with a voluptuous sound that, "hovers enticingly between East and West" (Uncut).

In 2003 Medunjanin recorded her first single "Mujo đogu po mejdanu voda" as a guest singer on Mostar Sevdah Reunion album.

After guesting on Mostar Sevdah Reunion's album A Secret Gate in 2003, Medunjanin recorded her debut album Rosa, on Snail Records in 2005. The album was excellently received in Great Britain and throughout Europe and was among the candidates for the album of the year. In April 2009 she released her Live album, a recording of a concert held at the Jazz Fest Sarajevo in 2008. In March 2010 the studio album Zumra was released, which fused contemporary accordion and arrangements to traditional melody, lyrics and vocal styling. The album Amulette was released by Harmonia Mundi / World Village on October 3, 2011.

The next album Silk and Stone was released by Aquarius Records in May 2014. The album received some good reviews in British media; The Guardian awarded 4* to the album, noting Medunjanin's "intimate, pained and gently compelling voice" and Nigel Williamson has described the album as a "career-defining third album from Bosnia's finest export" in Uncut.

On her next album Damar as in all her previous productions, Amira drew from Sevdah, the "beating heart" of Balkan music, reviving ancestral Balkan songs, whilst for the first time introducing new compositions and once again the Serbian pianist Bojan Z provides musical and production skills. The album was ranked among the 40 best in the world for 2017 by Transglobal World Music Chart.

On her most recent album, Ascending, Medunjanin is once again attracted to the source of traditional Sevdah with a new revival of the rebellious songs with Trondheim Soloists, and for the second time introduces a new composition into her visual repertoire.

== Discography ==
- A Secret Gate (Snail Records, 2003)
- Rosa (Snail Records, 2005)
- Amira Live (2009), a recording of a concert held at the Jazz Fest Sarajevo in 2008
- Zumra (Harmonia Mundi/World Village, 2010)
- Amulette (Harmonia Mundi/World Village, 2011)
- Silk and Stone (Aquarius Records, 2014)
- Damar (World Village, 2016)
- Ascending (Croatia Records, 2018)
- For Him and Her (Croatia Records, 2020)
