= Čoček =

Balkan musical genre and dance

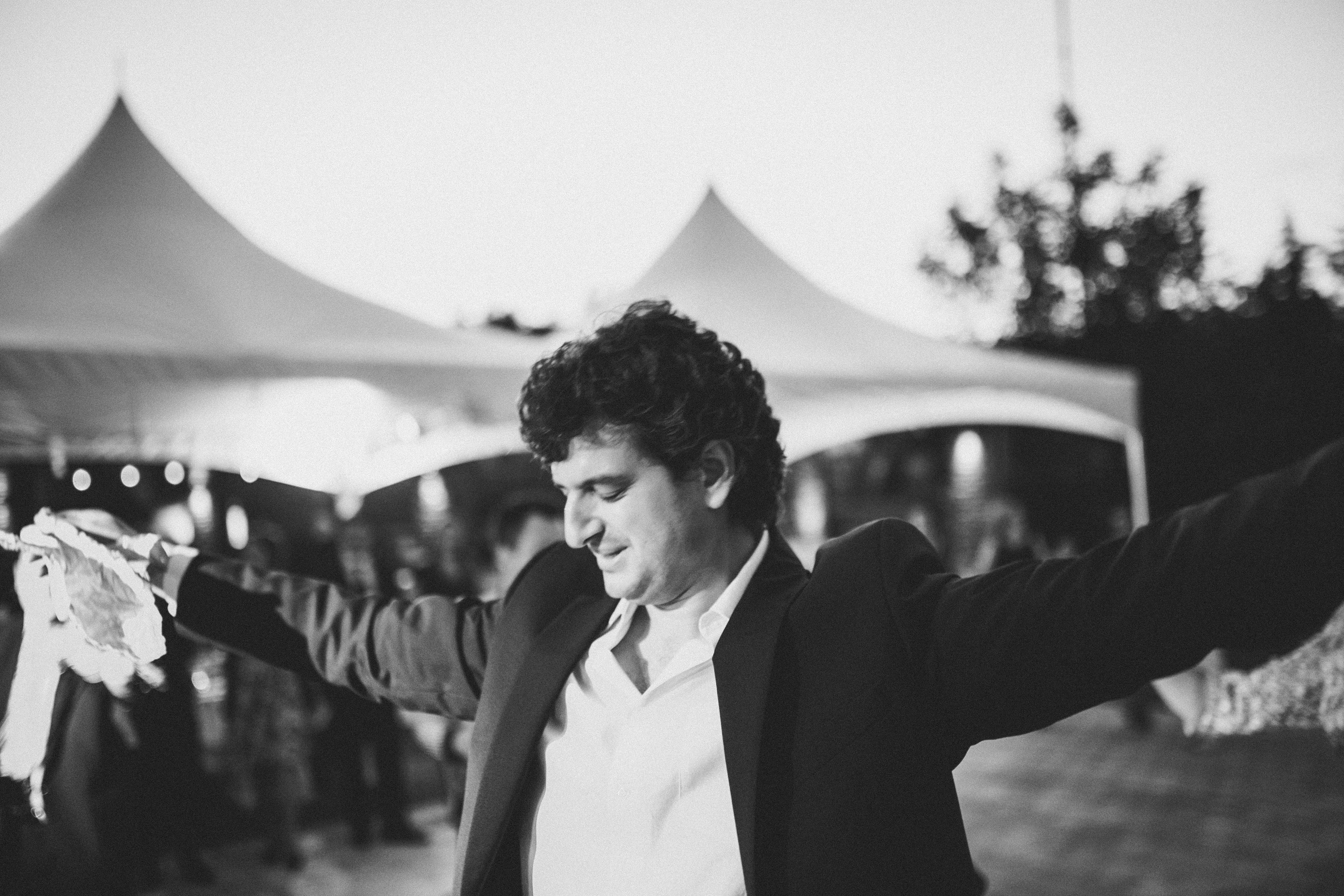
Macedonian man dancing čoček

Čoček (Albanian: çyçek/qyqek; Serbian and Macedonian: чочек, romanized: čoček; Bulgarian: кючек, romanized: kyuchek; Romanian: sistemul; Greek: Tsifteteli) is a musical genre and dance that emerged in the Balkans during the early 19th century. It features prominently in the repertoire of many Romani brass bands.

Čoček originated from Ottoman military bands, which at that time were scattered across the region, mostly throughout Serbia, Bulgaria, North Macedonia and Romania. That led to the eventual segmentation and wide range of ethnic sub-styles in čoček. Čoček was handed down through the generations, preserved mostly by Roma minorities, and was largely practiced at village weddings and banquets.

Čoček is especially popular among the Muslim Roma and Albanian populations of Kosovo, South Serbia and Macedonia. When Tanec first came to America in 1956, they performed čoček as a Muslim woman's dance, "Kjupurlika" from Titov Veles.

The kyuchek, as a common musical form in the Balkans (primarily Bulgaria and North Macedonia), is typically a dance with a 9/8 time signature; two variant forms have the beats divided 2-2-2-3 and 2-2-3-2. (This latter meter is sometimes referred to as "gypsy 9".) Roma musicians living in areas of the former Yugoslavia have broadened the form to include variations in 4/4 and 7/8.

In the international folk dance community, čoček is danced to many melodies. Dances in the čoček genre include Jeni Jol and Sa Sa.

Jazz composer and musician Dave Brubeck was influenced by čoček-type tempos. For example, "Blue Rondo à la Turk", from the Time Out album, was written following a 9/8 and 4/4 pattern.

== See also ==
- Balkan brass
