= Ljiljana Buttler =

Yugoslav musician (1944–2010)

- Born: Ljiljana Petrović; 14 December 1944; Belgrade, FS Serbia, DF Yugoslavia
- Died: 26 April 2010 (aged 65); Düsseldorf, Germany
- Occupation: Vocalist
- Years active: 1979–2010
- Children: 3
- Musical career
- Genres: Romani; folk; soul
- Instrument: vocals
- Labels: ZKP RTLJ; Snail Records

Ljiljana Buttler (née Petrović; 14 December 1944 – 26 April 2010) was a Yugoslav Romani folk singer comparable to Esma Redžepova, Vida Pavlović, and Šaban Bajramović.

== Early life ==
Buttler was born Ljiljana Petrović on 14 December 1944 in Belgrade, Democratic Federal Yugoslavia during World War II. Her father was a Romani accordionist from Serbia, while her mother was Ljiljana, a Croatian singer from Zagreb. Her father left the family shortly after the birth of his daughter. Petrović moved to the city of Bijeljina, PR Bosnia and Herzegovina, where her mother performed in pubs. As a teenager she began singing, she returned to Belgrade where she settled in the Skadarlija bohemian quarter.

== Career ==
Her debut album was recorded in 1982, and her popularity rose in that decade. During the Yugoslav Wars in the 1990s, she emigrated to Düsseldorf, West Germany, married and took her husband's name. In 2002, Dragi Šestić of Mostar Sevdah Reunion pursued her to come back and record an album. Her last album was released in 2009. She died of cancer in 2010, aged 65.

== Discography ==
=== Studio albums ===
- Đelem, đelem daje (with Ansambl Zorana Pejkovića, 1981)
- Duško, Duško (with Ansambl Ljubiše Pavkovića, 1982)
- Pevam do zore – zabavljam druge (with Orkestar Dragana Kneževića, 1983)
- Ljiljana Petrović (with Orkestar Dušana Mitrovića Nivoa, 1985)
- The Mother of Gypsy Soul (with Mostar Sevdah Reunion, 2002)
- The Legends of Life (with Mostar Sevdah Reunion, 2005)
- Frozen Roses (2009)

=== Live albums ===
- Once Upon a Time in Mostar (Live) (with Mostar Sevdah Reunion, 2005)

=== Compilation albums ===
- Najlepše ciganske pesme (with Šaban Bajramović, 1991)
