= Boban Marković =

Serbian musician

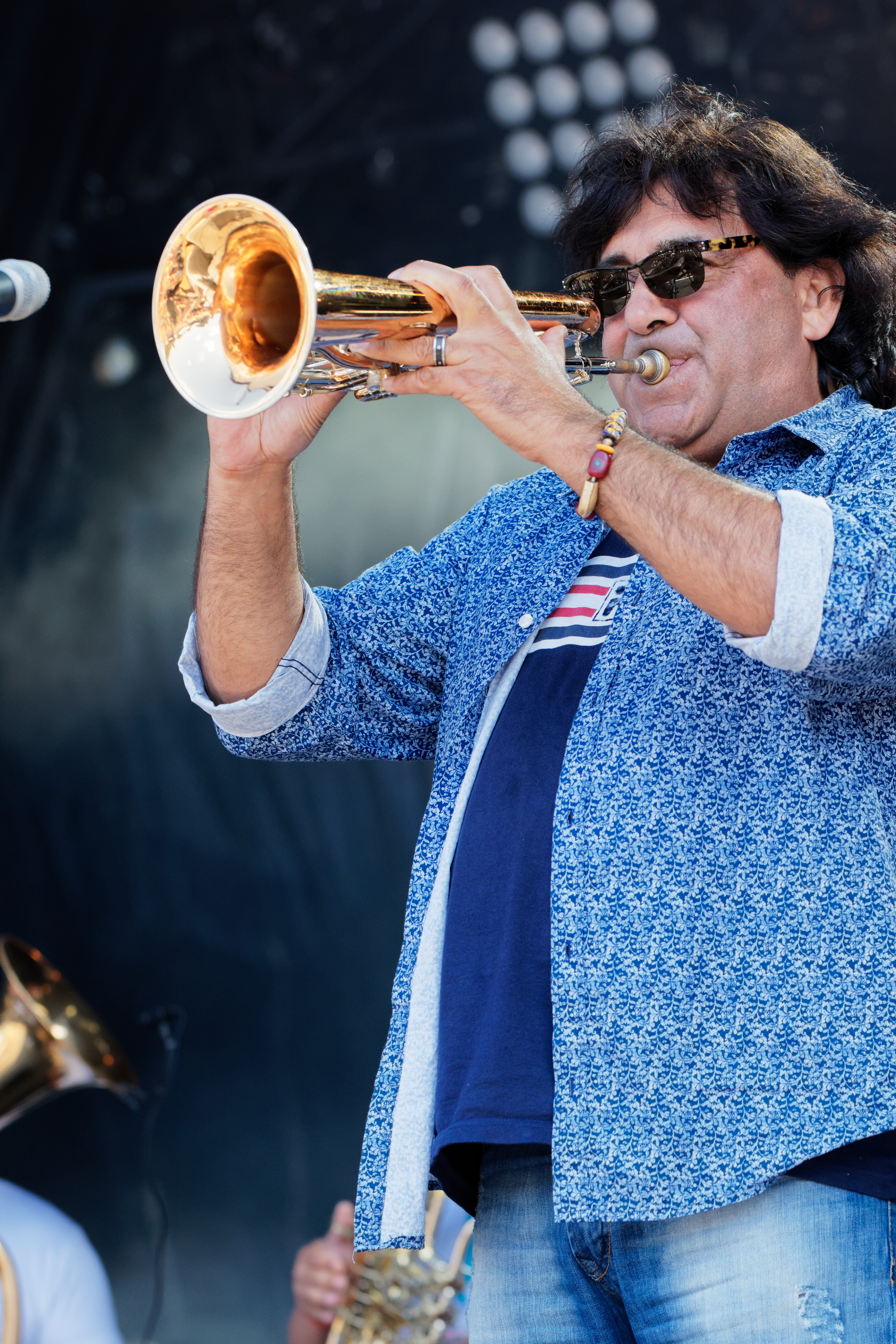

Background information
- Born: 6 May 1964
- Origin: Vladičin Han, SR Serbia, Yugoslavia
- Genres: Serbian folk World; Jazz
- Instrument: Trumpet

Boban Marković (Serbian Cyrillic: Бобан Марковић) is a Serbian trumpet player and brass ensemble leader from Vladičin Han.

== Work ==
He is of Romani background.

The Boban Marković Orkestar is a Balkan brass band from Vladičin Han, Southern Serbia, which can be clearly heard in their music. They have won several of the most important prizes ("Golden Trumpet", "First Trumpet" and "The Best Orchestra") at the Guča trumpet festival, called "Dragačevski Sabor", which has been held every August in Central Serbia's town of Guča, since 1961.

Boban Marković Orkestar won the "Best Orchestra" prize at 40th "Sabor" in Guča, August 2000. They won the "Best concert 2000" prize for their concert with Felix Lajko. In Guča, at "Dragačevski Sabor", Boban Marković won "The First Trumpet" five times between 1988 and 2001.

Boban Marković Brass Band also contributed a song to "Unblocked (Music from the Eastern Europe"), a compilation on Ellipsis Arts in the United States. The orchestra is featured on two tracks on "Srbija: Sounds Global", a series of compilations released in 2000 by Radio B92, and on the opening track of "Srbija: Sounds Global 2", which was released November 2002 by B92.

They performed music for one of Emir Kusturica's movies: Underground as well as others in Balkan cinema. They are the main characters of the documentary film Competition and are featured further in Guča, a documentary about the Serbian trumpet festival. Marko Marković also played the role of Romeo in the music film Gucha - Distant Trumpet by Dušan Milić.

They have played festivals and concerts in Portugal, Greece, Switzerland, Belgium, the United States, Canada, Romania, the Netherlands, Hungary, Great Britain, Sweden, Finland, Russia, Poland, Italy, Austria, Monaco, Germany, France, Denmark, Israel, Spain, Slovenia, Slovakia, Croatia, Czech Republic, Turkey and at many wedding parties.

In 2000 at the Sziget Festival in Hungary, they played at the "World Music stage" in front of a 15,000-strong crowd. At the same time Network Records, released the double CD "Golden Brass Summit" – Anthology of 40 years in Guča, for which Boban Marković Orkestar opens the album with 4 tracks.

The regular brass band sound is improved with another two percussionists. Since October 1999 they have also been performing with the young violin player Lajko Felix a programme arranged by Lajko Felix and Boban Marković. The band has opened up to more collaborations, one with Austrian duet Attwenger and the other with Frank London's Klezmer Brass All Stars Di Shikere Kapelye. Together they formed the Brotherhood of Brass.

== Personal life ==
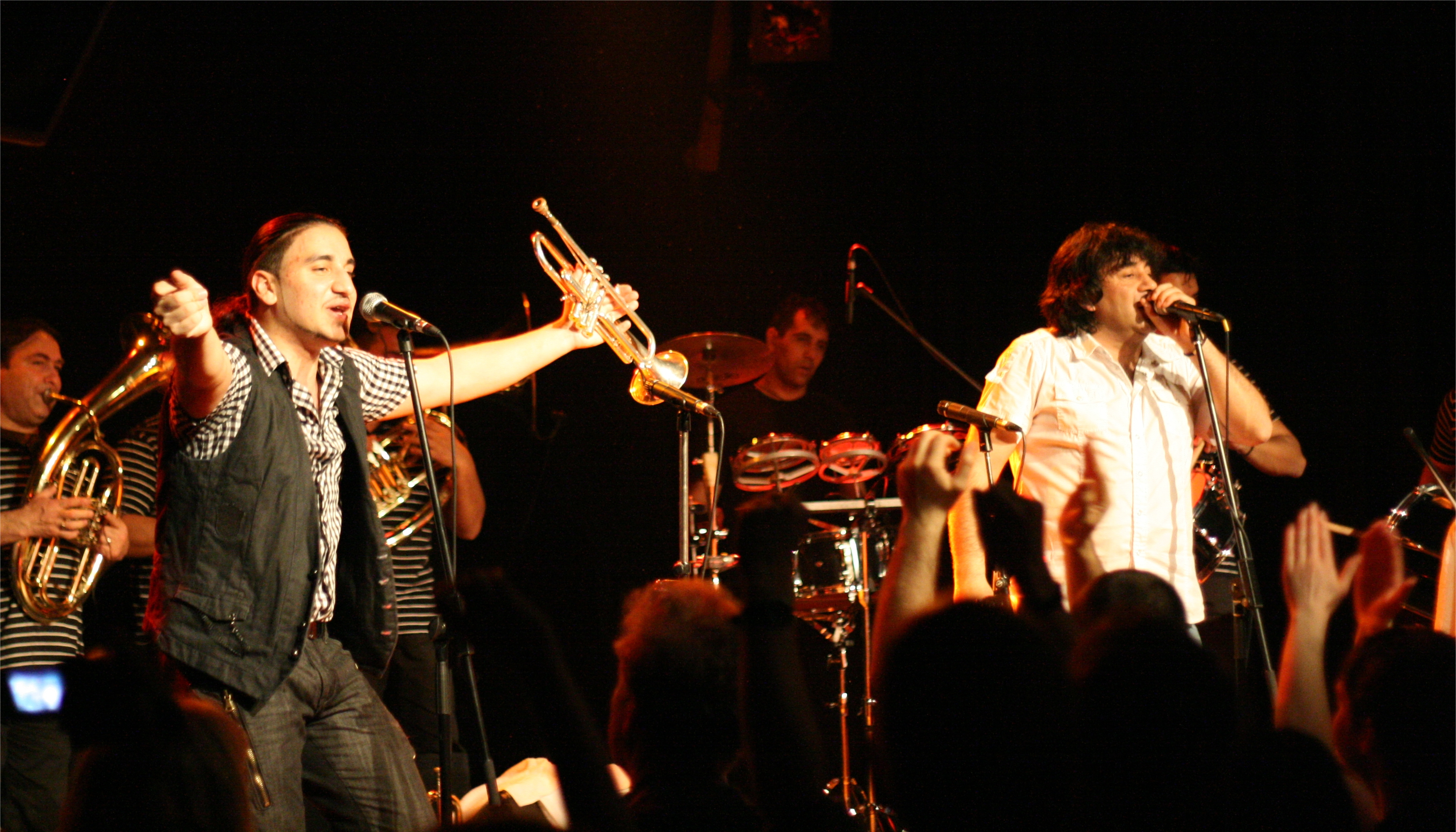
Marko and Boban Marković

Boban Marković's son, Marko, has played with the band since 2002. During the two years he spent touring with the band, 17-year-old Marko became the main soloist and arranger of the band. Both Boban and Marko are featured in the movie Usti Opre, a documentary with other famous Gypsy musicians, and also in Guča, a documentary about the Serbian Trumpet festival. "Usti Opre" was premiered at the festival in August 2005.

== Discography ==
- "Hani Rumba" (1997) (ITMM)
- "Zlatna Truba" (1998) (Golden Trumpet) (PGP-RTS)
- "Srce Cigansko" (2000) (Gypsy Heart) (X Produkcio)
- "Millennium" (2000) (X Produkcio)
- "Bistra Reka" (2002) (X Produkcio)
- "Live in Belgrade" (2002) (Piranha Musik)
- "Boban i Marko" (2003) (Piranha Musik)
- "The Promise (Balkan Mix)" (2006) (Piranha Musik)
- "The Promise (International Mix)" (2006) (Piranha Musik)
- "Go Marko Go! Brass Madness" (2007) (Piranha Musik)
- "Devla" (2009) (B92)
- "Balkan Brass Battle" (2011) together with Fanfare Ciocărlia (Asphalt Tango Records)
- "Golden Horns: The Best of Boban i Marko Marković Orkestar" (2012) (Piranha Musik)
- "Gipsy Manifesto" (2013) (Piranha Musik)
