= Mostar Sevdah Reunion =

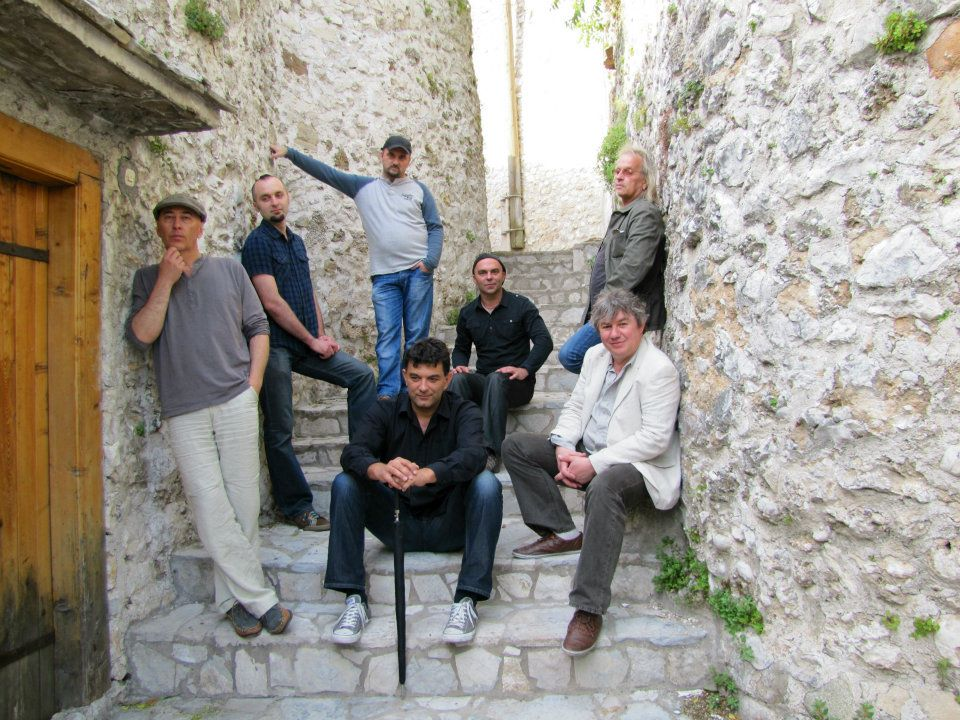

Background information
- Origin: Mostar, Bosnia and Herzegovina
- Genres: world-fusion
- Years active: 1998–present
- Labels: Snail Records
- Members: Mišo Petrović; Sandi Duraković; Antonija Batinić; Marko Jakovljević; Gabrijel Prusina; Senad Trnovac; Vanja Radoja
- Past members: Nermin Alukić Čerkez; Milutin Sretenović Sreta; Ilijaz Delić; Nedeljko Kovačević; Mustafa Šantić; Suad Pašić; Kosta Latinović; Ljiljana Buttler; Esma Redžepova; Šaban Bajramović

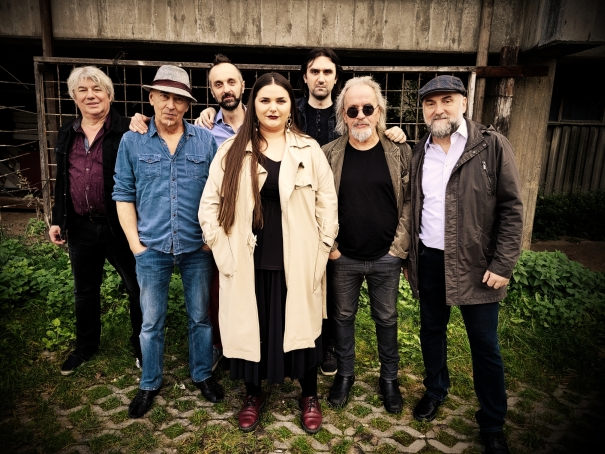

Mostar Sevdah Reunion is a world-fusion musical ensemble from Mostar, Bosnia and Herzegovina playing almost exclusively sevdalinka fused with contemporary musical styles. The band is composed of experienced musicians and often collaborates with renowned musicians in the field of Roma music: they made two albums with Šaban Bajramović and two albums with Ljiljana Buttler. Ljiljana frequently toured with the band until her death in 2010.

The band was formed by Dragi Šestić in Mostar in 1998. It started out as a group of local, talented and experienced musicians. They were old friends who came together again in summer 1999 to record their first album.

Their first CD was released 1999. Since then they became popular with world music audiences, performing at various world music festivals and receiving a number of music awards.

The band members are: Mišo Petrović (lead guitar), Sandi Duraković (guitar), Antonija Batinić (vocal), Marko Jakovljević (bass), Gabrijel Prusina (piano), Senad Trnovac (drums) and Vanja Radoja (violin).

== Discography ==
=== Studio albums ===
- Mostar Sevdah Reunion (1999, World Connection)
- A Gypsy Legend (with Šaban Bajramović, 2001, World Connection)
- The Mother of Gypsy Soul (with Ljiljana Buttler, 2002, Snail Records)
- A Secret Gate (2003, Snail Records)
- The Legends of Life (with Ljiljana Buttler, 2005, Snail Records)
- Šaban (2006, Snail Records)
- Café Sevdah (2007, Snail Records)
- Frozen Roses (with Ljiljana Buttler, 2009, Snail Records)
- Tales from a Forgotten City (2013, Snail Records)
- The Balkan Autumn (with Sreta, 2018, Snail Records)
- Lady Sings The Balkan Blues (2022, Snail Records)
- Bosa Mara (2024, Snail Records)

=== Live albums ===
- Once Upon A Time In Mostar (2005, Snail Records)
- Kings of Sevdah (2016, Snail Records)
- Live In Sarajevo (2023, Snail Records)

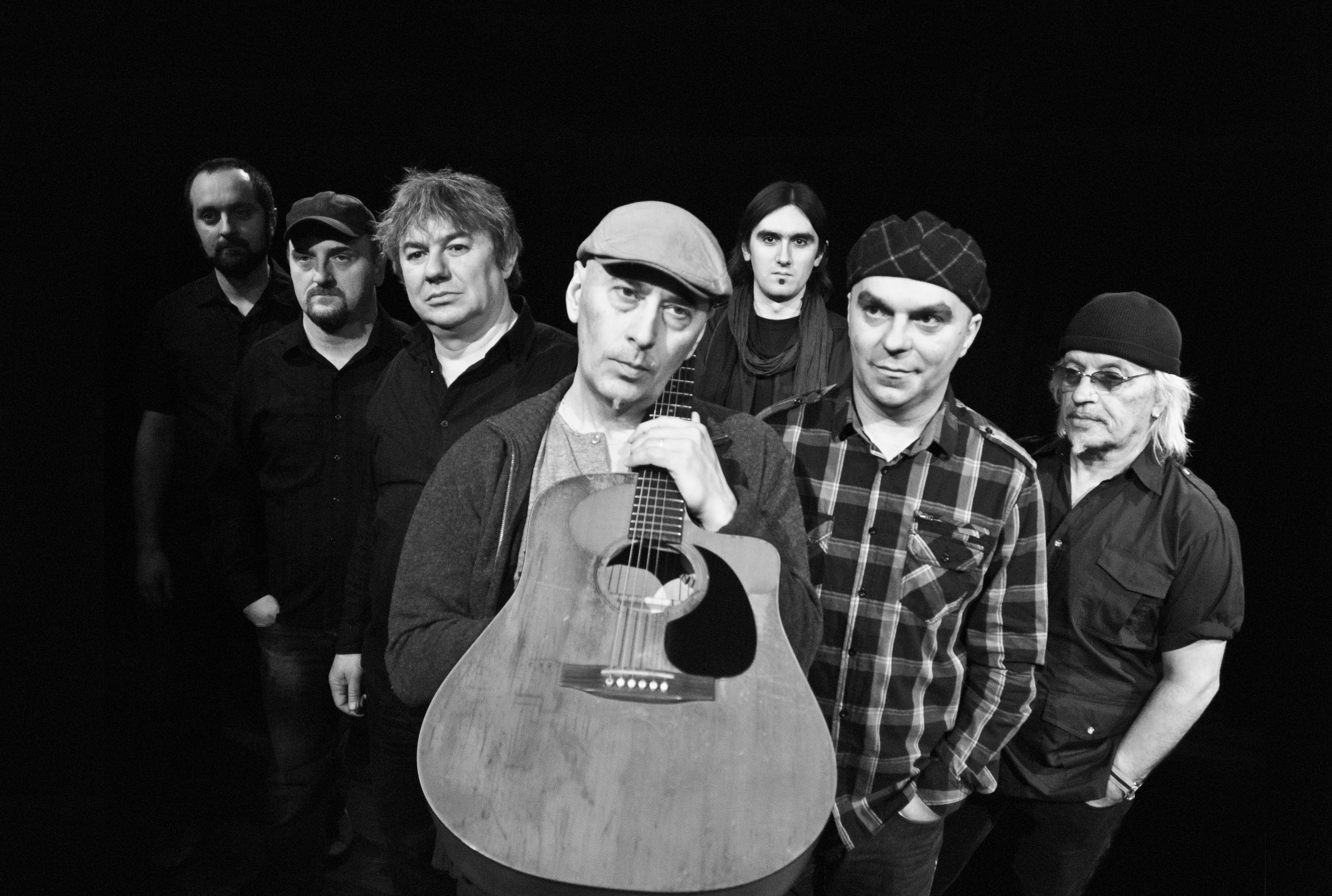
Mostar Sevdah Reunion

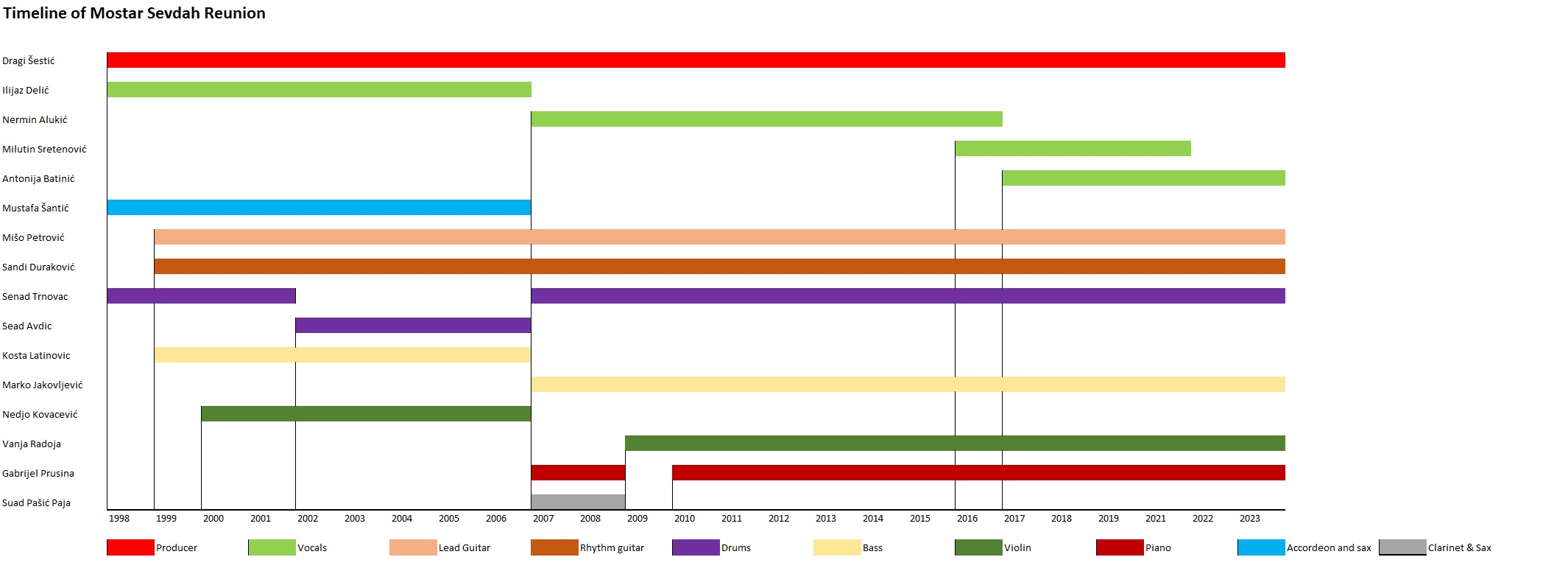
Timeline of the band Mostar Sevdah Reunion

== Awards ==
- "Songlines (magazine)" - Best World Music Group 2024
- "Transglobal World Music Charts" - Best European World Music album 2023
- "Davorin" Bosnian Music Awards: The Best Album Of The Year 2004
- "Davorin" Bosnian Music Awards: The Best Ethno Album Of The Year 2003 (for "The Mother of Gypsy Soul: Ljiljana Buttler")
- "Davorin" Bosnian Music Awards: Special Award 2002

== Films ==
- Mostar Sevdah Reunion - by Pjer Žalica 2000
- Sevdah the Bridge that Survived - by Mira Erdevički 2005
- Tales From A Forgotten City - by Amir Grabus 2013
