= Fanfare Ciocărlia =

Romanian Balkan brass band

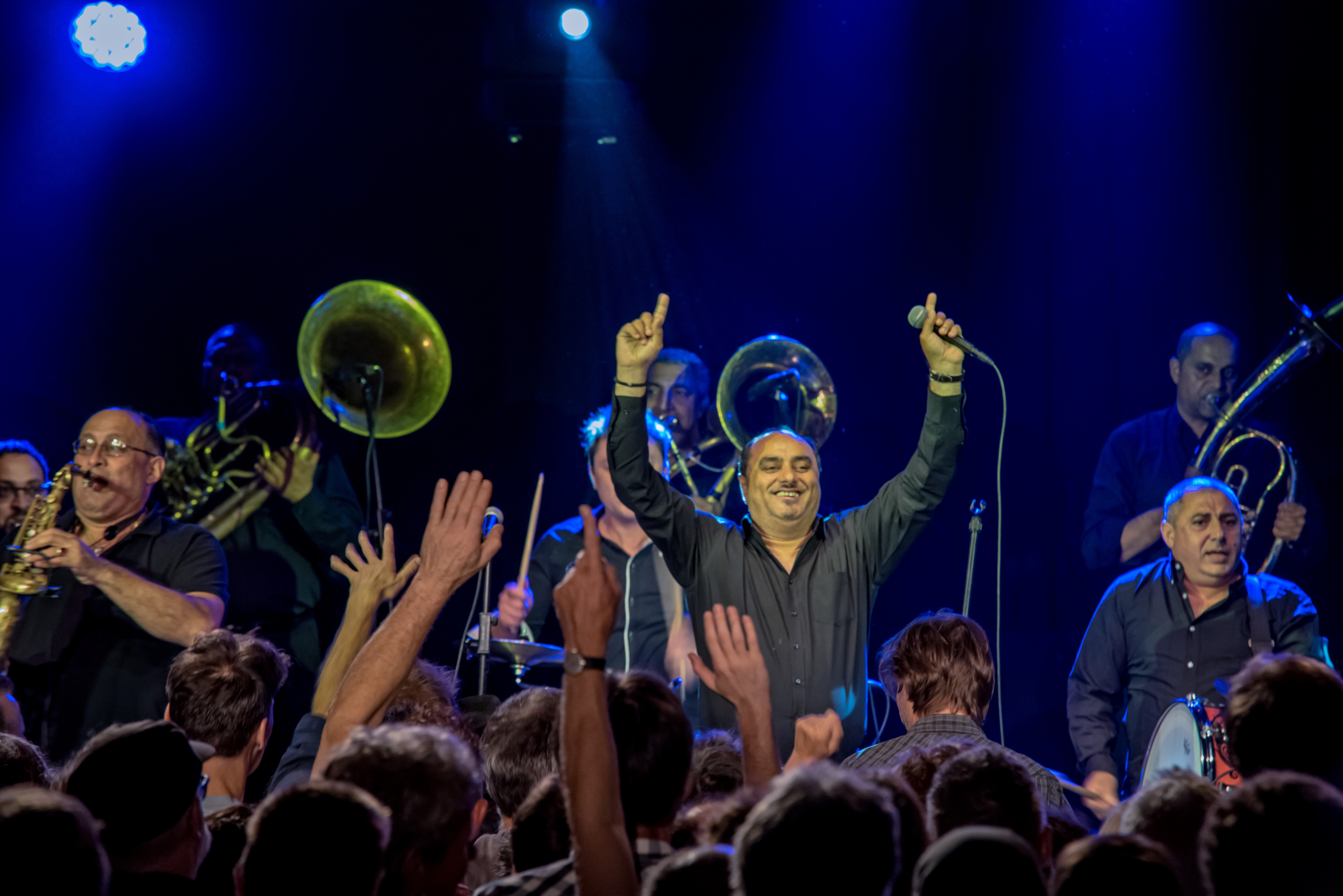
- Fanfare Ciocărlia in 2017

Background information
- Origin: Zece Prăjini, Iași County, Romania
- Genre: Balkan brass
- Years active: 1996–present
- Members: Costel Oprică Ivancea; Dan Ionel Ivancea; Costică Trifan; Paul Marian Bulgaru; Lazăr Rădulescu; Crăciun Ovidiu Trifan; Benedikt Stehle; Costel Ursu; Constantin Cântea; Monel Trifan; Constantin Călin; Laurențiu Mihai Ivancea
- Past members: Ioan Ivancea

Fanfare Ciocărlia is a twelve-piece Romani Balkan brass band from the northeastern Romanian village of Zece Prăjini. They are known for their fast, high-energy music with complex rhythms and high-speed staccato clarinet, saxophone, and trumpet solos.

Fanfare Ciocărlia's music includes traditional Romanian, Romani, and Eastern European folk pieces, as well as arrangements of Western songs, including "Born to Be Wild", "James Bond Theme", "Caravan", and "Summertime". The band performed at the 2012 Nobel Peace Prize ceremony in Oslo, Norway. They are featured on the soundtrack of Borat Subsequent Moviefilm, released in 2020. The band's version of "Moliendo Café" is used as the theme of the 2024 animated series Creature Commandos.

== History ==
=== Origins ===
Fanfare Ciocărlia, a twelve-member brass band, originate from Zece Prăjini, a village located in Western Moldavia, northeastern Romania. The village is entirely populated by Romani families. Traditionally, most men in the village work either as subsistence farmers or at factories in nearby towns. Playing an instrument is a family tradition, and while the village is noted locally for its brass musicians, none consider themselves to be professionals.

The group's instruments include trumpets, tenor and baritone horns, tubas, clarinets, saxophones, bass drum, and various percussion instruments. Their song lyrics are usually in either Romani or Romanian. Their musical style stems primarily from the traditions of Romani and Romanian folk dance music, but they also borrow freely from Turkish, Bulgarian, Serbian, and North Macedonian musical styles, and they incorporate a number of tunes gleaned from international radio, Hollywood, and Bollywood into their repertoire.

=== From village obscurity to European fame: 1996–1999 ===
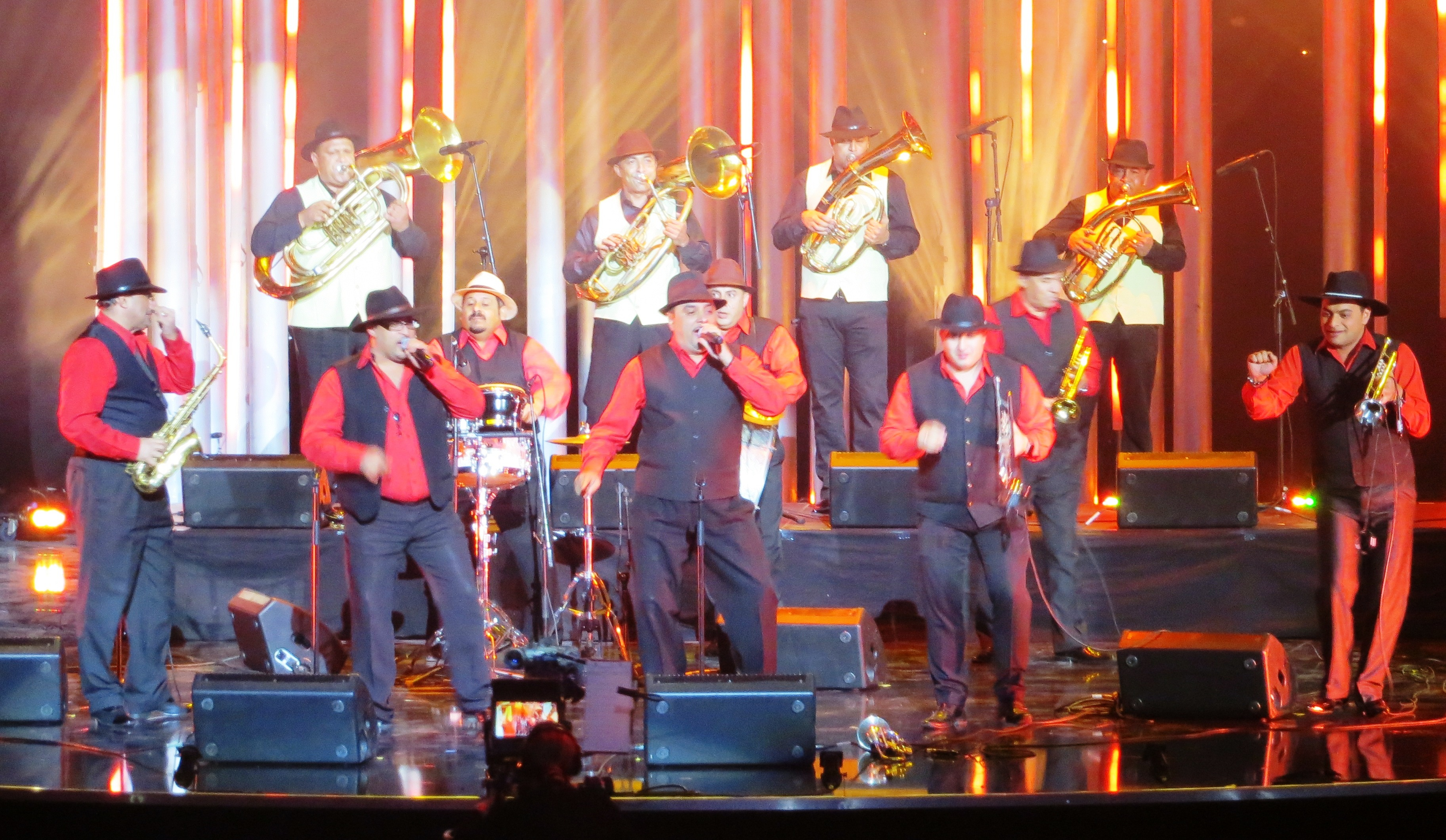
Fanfare Ciocărlia at the Nobel Peace Concert 2012 in Oslo, Norway

Henry Ernst, a German sound engineer who frequently travelled to Romania, returned to northern Romania in October 1996 to search for traditional village musicians. In Moldavia, a farmer suggested he head to the small Romani village of Zece Prăjini, where a brass band existed and played at weddings and baptisms. Once there, Ernst was introduced to Ioan Ivancea, a local farmer and clarinet player who was considered the leader of the village musicians. Ivancea assembled the brass band and they performed for Ernst, who was impressed by their skill level. He decided to return to Germany and set up a tour for Fanfare Ciocărlia—as the band had now named themselves—and told the musicians that they should apply for passports. Ernst managed to book the band for a series of festival and club dates. Afterward, Ernst received a phone call from WDR, a German public broadcasting institution and festival promoter, who wanted to book Fanfare Ciocărlia and was willing to pay a fee that would cover all transport, visas, and other expenses. The deal allowed Ernst and his collaborator, Helmut Neumann, to form the management and booking agency Asphalt Tango.

Fanfare Ciocărlia quickly won a large following in northern Europe, with their powerful brass sound appealing to rock and rave fans as well as world music audiences. In 1997, Ernst and Neumann brought the band into Bucharest's Electrecord studio to create their debut album. The record, Radio Pașcani, was released on the Berlin label Piranha Musik in 1998 and proved an instant success. Radio Pașcani received positive reviews—many reviewers noted that they had never heard a brass band who played with such speed and Eastern flavour—and went on to become one of the biggest-selling albums in Piranha Musik's catalogue (selling over 150,000 copies on CD), making it amongst the most popular Eastern European albums released in the West.

=== From European success to worldwide fame: 1999–2005 ===
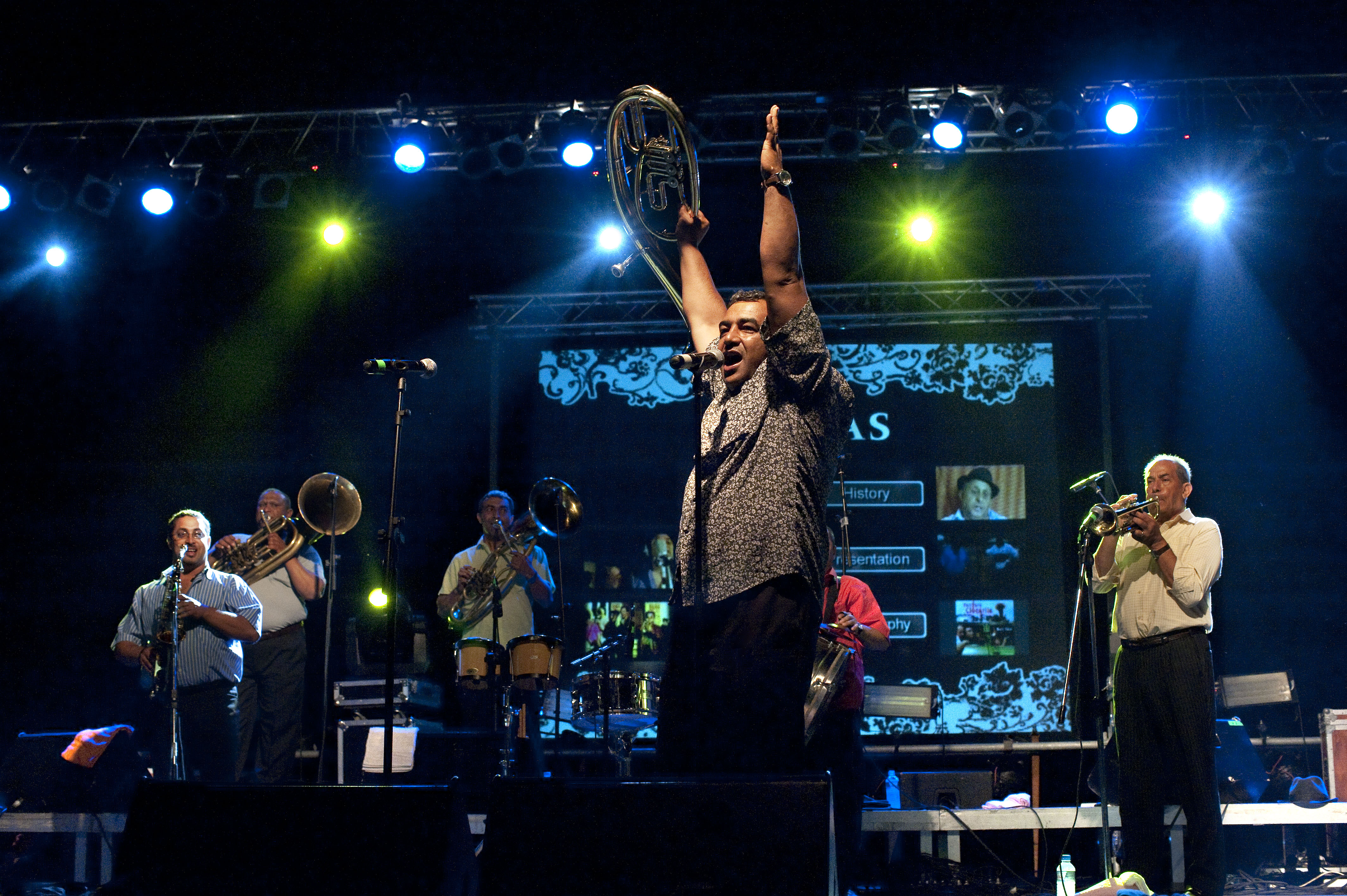
Fanfare Ciocărlia performing in 2009

From 1999 to 2005, Fanfare Ciocărlia toured extensively, playing across Europe and the United States. The band's second album, Baro Biao, was also recorded at Electrecord's studio and released on Piranha Musik. Baro Biao was well received and helped further Fanfare Ciocărlia's international popularity. Dates in Japan and Australia followed, as well as playing at the UK's WOMAD Festival. In 2001, Piranha Musik released the band's third album, Iag Bari. The record featured music influenced by New Orleans jazz standards (West Side Blues), along with Romanian folk music, including the ballad "Lume, Lume".

Fanfare Ciocărlia continued their international touring schedule, accompanied by German film director Ralf Marschalleck, who followed them from their village to Berlin and Tokyo for his feature-length documentary, Iag Bari – Brass on Fire. In 2005, Ernst and Neumann produced the Fanfare Ciocărlia album Gili Garabdi – Ancient Secrets of Gypsy Brass, both in the band's home village of Zece Prajini and in Berlin's Headroom Studio. The album featured the band's interpretations of "James Bond Theme" and Duke Ellington's "Caravan". Both tracks became popular staples of the band's repertoire. British world music DJ Charlie Gillett often played "Caravan" on his BBC Radio shows and included it on his double-CD compilation World 2006. In 2005, Fanfare Ciocărlia appeared on the cover of Garth Cartwright's book Princes Amongst Men: Journeys with Gypsy Musicians. The book contained interviews with Ernst and members of the band.

=== Death of Ioan Ivancea; concert and recording collaborations: 2005–2015 ===
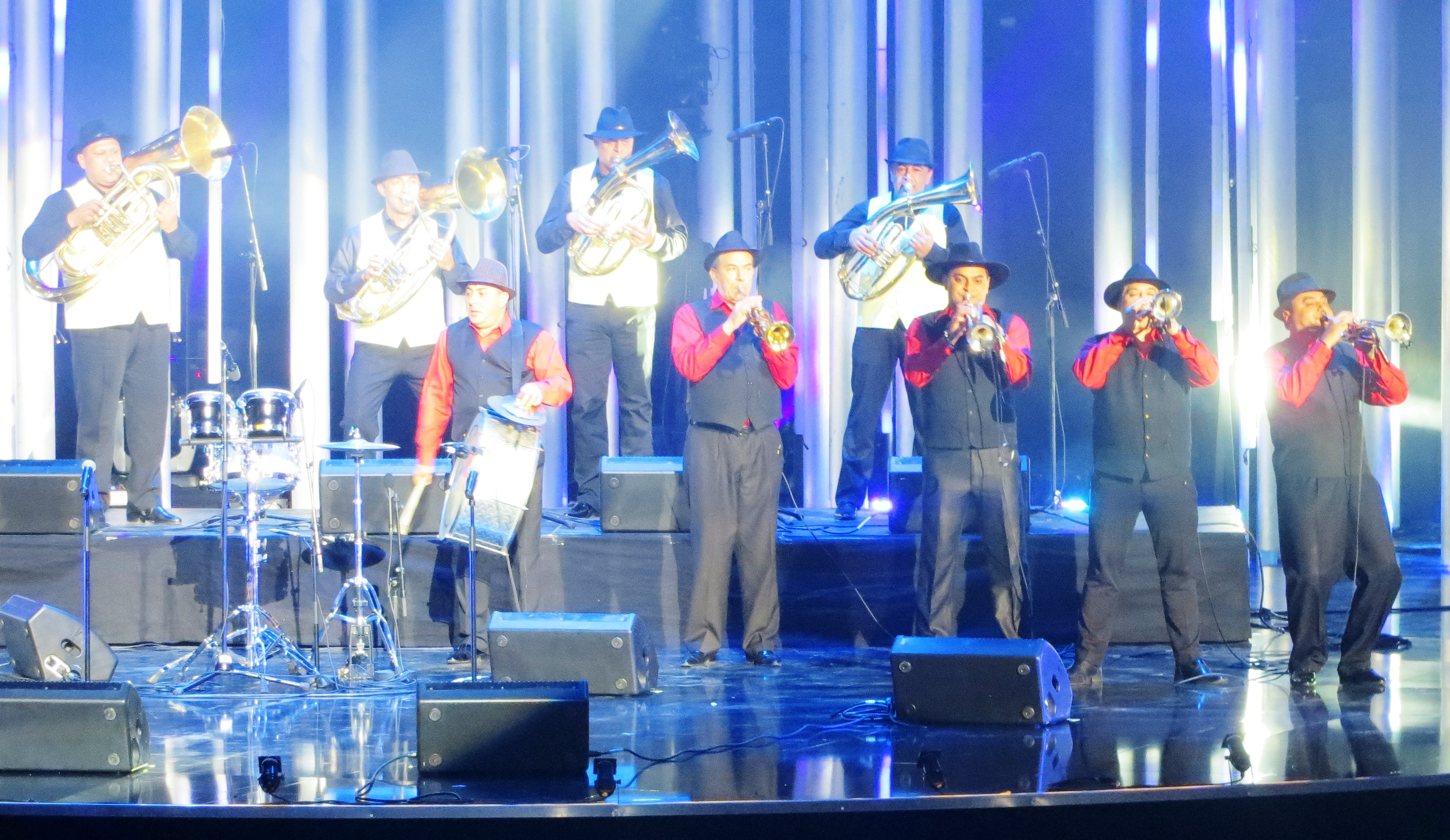
Fanfare Ciocărlia in 2012

Ioan Ivancea was diagnosed with cancer in 2005 and, after a short period of illness, died in October 2006. After a period of mourning, Fanfare Ciocărlia determined that they would continue playing. Balkan Gypsy music was now at the zenith of its popularity and Fanfare Ciocărlia were considered to be amongst the genre's most popular bands, their concerts attracting large audiences, while DJs played their records in clubs. Ernst and Neumann decided that an effective way of both celebrating Ivancea's life and capitalising on the public's enthusiasm for Gypsy music would be by publishing a new album. This involved getting an array of guest vocalists to sing on selected songs, with Fanfare Ciocărlia backing them. The vocalists engaged for the album were Esma Redzepova (North Macedonia), Saban Bajramovic (Serbia), Kaloome (France), Ljiljana Buttler (Serbia), Jony Iliev (Bulgaria), Florentina Sandu (Romania), Dan Armeanca (Romania), and Mitsou (Hungary). The record, titled Queens and Kings, finished with "Farewell March", a funeral ballad sung by Ioan Ivancea that had been recorded by Ernst but never previously released. It also included "Born to Be Wild", Fanfare Ciocărlia's rendition of the Steppenwolf classic that the band had recorded for the soundtrack to Borat in 2006 (their music was later featured in the 2020 sequel, Borat Subsequent Moviefilm). The first concert on the Gypsy Queens & Kings tour took place in Bucharest in December 2006 and found Fanfare Ciocărlia playing Romania's capital for the first time, joined on stage by Esma Redzepova, Jony Iliev, and Mitsou. Queens and Kings was released by Asphalt Tango in 2007, and the band began touring across Europe and Australia. After more than two years on the road, Fanfare Ciocărlia took a year off to rest. Bucharest-based Gypsy band Mahala Rai Banda backed the group for the latter part of 2009 and much of 2010.

Fanfare Ciocărlia won the BBC Radio 3 World Music Award for Europe in 2006.

Asphalt Tango Records released Princes Amongst Men – The Soundtrack to the Book in 2008. The compilation came out to complement the German edition of Garth Cartwright's book and featured Fanfare Ciocărlia on the cover. In September 2009, Asphalt Tango simultaneously released two Fanfare Ciocărlia albums: Live, which featured the band's Berlin concert, and Best of Gypsy Brass, a compilation record.

Fanfare Ciocărlia returned to the studio in early 2011, with Ernst producing on the Balkan Brass Battle sessions. This album—and subsequent concert tour—pitted Fanfare Ciocărlia against Serbian Gypsy brass band Boban & Marco Markovic Orkestar. The pairing of the two Balkan brass bands proved popular, and the ensembles toured Europe several times, both bands sharing the stage as they engaged in a good-natured battle to see who could generate the loudest audience response.

Having toured Balkan Brass Battle internationally, Fanfare Ciocărlia were invited to Toronto in 2013 to record with Canadian guitarist Adrian Raso. The resulting album, Devil's Tale, was released by Asphalt Tango Records in the spring of 2014 and billed as Adrian Raso and Fanfare Ciocărlia.

=== Twentieth anniversary, new releases: 2016–present ===
In 2016, Fanfare Ciocărlia released their eighth studio album, Onwards to Mars!, on Asphalt Tango Records. The album included "Fiesta de Negritos", a cumbia dance track they recorded in Medellín, Colombia with Puerto Candelaria. The same year, the band celebrated their twentieth anniversary. To commemorate this, Fanfare Ciocărlia released the compilation 20 and participated in a world tour.

In 2021, Fanfare Ciocărlia published their latest album, It Wasn't Hard to Love You.

== Band members ==
Current

- Costel Oprică Ivancea – saxophone, clarinet
- Dan Ionel Ivancea – saxophone, vocals
- Costică "Cimai" Trifan – trumpet, vocals
- Paul Marian Bulgaru – trumpet
- Lazăr Rădulescu – trumpet, vocals
- Crăciun Ovidiu Trifan – trumpet
- Benedikt Stehle – percussion
- Costel "Gisniaca" Ursu – bass drum
- Constantin Cântea – tuba
- Monel Trifan – tuba
- Constantin Călin – tenor horn
- Laurențiu Mihai Ivancea – baritone horn

Past

- Ioan Ivancea – vocals

== Discography ==
=== Studio albums ===
- Radio Pașcani (1998)
- Baro Biao – World Wide Wedding (1999)
- Iag Bari – The Gypsy Horns from the Mountains Beyond (2001)
- Gili Garabdi – Ancient Secrets of Gypsy Brass (2005)
- Queens and Kings (2007)
- Onwards to Mars! (2016)
- It Wasn't Hard to Love You (2021)

=== Collaborations ===
- Aco Bocina (special guest Fanfare Ciocărlia) – Aco Bocina (2001)
- Boban & Marko Marković Orkestar with Fanfare Ciocărlia – Balkan Brass Battle (2011)
- Boban Marković, Fanfare Ciocărlia & more – Brass Noir – On the Trans Balkan Highway (2011)
- Adrian Raso and Fanfare Ciocărlia – Devil's Tale (2014)

=== Live albums ===
- Live (2009)

=== Compilations ===
- Princes Amongst Men – The Soundtrack to the Book (2008)
- Best of Gypsy Brass (2009)
- 20 (2016)

=== DVDs ===
- Gypsy Brass Legends – The Story of the Band (2004)

== See also ==
- Lăutărească music
- Ciocârlia (lăutaresc tune)
