= Lume, lume, soro lume =

Romanian lăutărească folk song

Song
- Language: Romanian
- English title: World, world, sister-world
- Published: 1885 (text collected 1883)
- Recorded: 1952 (first known recording, by Taraful din Clejani)
- Genre: lăutărească music; muzica de petrecere
- Composer: Traditional
- Lyricist: Traditional

"Lume, lume, soro lume" (Romanian: [ˈlu.me ˈlu.me ˈso.ro ˈlu.me]; "World, world, sister-world") is a Romanian lăutăreasca folk song that exists in many variants. The text of the version by the lăutar Petrea Crețul Șolcan of Brăila was collected in 1883 by the folklorist Gheorghe Dem Teodorescu and published in 1885 in his collection of folk poems, among the doinas. The singer addresses the world as a sister: he loves to live well, fears that he may die as early as tomorrow, and asks when he will have had enough of the world, answering himself: when the [coffin] board sounds. Commentators have found in the song sadness at the transience of life, a love of the world with all its hardships, and an unquenchable desire to live.

The first known sound recording was made in 1952 by the Taraful din Clejani. The song was popularised by Ion Crețu (1957) and by Maria Tănase (1958); it was also recorded by Gică Petrescu, Romica Puceanu, Anatol Ștefăneț, the lăutar brass band Fanfare Ciocărlia, Geta Burlacu, and others. Twentieth-century recordings differ in the choice of stanzas and imagery.

== History ==
The Romanian writer and folklorist Gheorghe Dem Teodorescu wrote down the text of "Lume, lume, soro lume" on 9 August 1883 in Muntenia, at the resort of Lacu Sărat. His informant was the lăutar Petrea Crețul Șolcan of Brăila, a member of a dynasty of Romani musicians who had belonged to monasteries. Teodorescu published the song in 1885 in his book Poezii populare române ("Romanian folk poems"). He insisted that transcriptions remain faithful to the folk texts, and reproached Vasile Alecsandri for failing to do so. In a note preceding the text, Teodorescu mentions a similar song, "Lume, lume", in the collection Dorul Românului of 1889. (Note: A reference in 1885 to an edition of 1889 is evidently a misprint. The bibliographic reference work on ethnographic and folklore publications for 1800–1891 lists only two collections titled Dorul Romanului. Culegere de canturile cele mai noi, from 1878 and 1879.) The French poet and translator Jules Brun published French translations of Romanian ballads and songs in 1896, with a preface by Teodorescu. The book included a translation of the text of "Lume, lume, soro lume" as "Le monde" (French: Le monde, ma chère, le monde!...).

=== The lăutar Petrea Crețul Șolcan ===
Teodorescu's collaboration with Petrea Șolcan lasted through 1883–1884. Șolcan's repertoire became one of the main sources of Poezii populare române. Teodorescu greatly admired his informant's phenomenal memory, stressing not only its extent but also the artistic merit of the performer. In a public lecture delivered at the Romanian Athenaeum in Bucharest on 11 March 1884, which became the basis of a separate monograph, the scholar assessed the musician's contribution as follows:

To give you an idea of the wealth that a single memory can hold, I assure you that in the short space of 3–4 days he recited and sang to me ballads and doinas amounting to no fewer than 7,000 lines, which in quantity is comparable to eleven books of Homer's Iliad or nine books of Virgil's Aeneid. Which of us could recite from memory eleven Homeric rhapsodies and nine Virgilian cantos? (Note: Romanian: Spre a vă forma o idee despre bogăția păstrată într'o memorie, vă afirm că în scurtul spațiu de 3–4 zile, mi-a spus și mi-a cântat legende și doine cari nu cuprind mai puțin de 7000 de versuri, ceea ce asamănă în cantitate cu XI cărți din „Iliada" lui Omer, cu IX cărți din „Eneida" lui Virgiliu. Cine din noi știe să recite 11 rapsodii omerice și 9 cântări vergiliane?)

— Quoted in Poslușnicu 1928, p. 600.

The music historian Mihail Poslușnicu wrote that Șolcan's "treasury" contained songs from beyond the Olt and the traditions of Ialomița, Brăila and Covurlui, "with ancient and plaintive melodies".

Speranța Rădulescu noted that several well-known epic songs that Teodorescu recorded from Petrea Șolcan have appeared in Romanian school textbooks for a century. The well-known Romanian jazz musician Johnny Răducanu called himself a great-grandson of Petrea Șolcan.

== Performances ==
External videos
- YouTube_social_white_circle_(2017) Lume, lume, soro lume
- Taraful din Clejani, 1952
- Ion Crețu, 1957
- Maria Tănase, 1958
- Gică Petrescu, 1967
- Romica Puceanu, 1969
- Anatol Ștefăneț, 1998
- Fanfare Ciocărlia & The Bulgarian Voices Angelite, 2001
- Geta Burlacu, 2005

The first known sound recording of the song was made in 1952 by staff of the Institute of Folklore from representatives of the southern lăutar tradition: Gheorghe Moțoi and the Taraful din Clejani (taraf of Clejani). (Note: Speranța Rădulescu recorded the next generation of Clejani musicians in 1991 in the Ethnophonie series under the title Lăutarii din Clejani. They later became known as Taraf de Haïdouks.) The recording, made in Muntenia, was not published until 2007, when, on the initiative of the musicologist Marian Lupașcu, it was released on CD in the Ediția de Colecție series issued by the newspaper Jurnalul Național.

The singer Ion Crețu of Iași made the song well known by recording it in 1957 for Radio Romania, accompanied by the folk music orchestra Doina Moldovei. At the end of 1958 the song was recorded by the celebrated singer Maria Tănase, which brought it wide popularity. In the liner notes to a boxed set of Maria Tănase's records (1977), the ethnomusicologist Tiberiu Alexandru described "Lume, lume" as an urban lăutar party song (Romanian: cântec de petrecere), noting Ion Crețu's role in popularising it and the qualities of Tănase's performance. (Note: "An urban lăutar party song, widely popularised not long ago by Ion Crețu, the well-known Moldavian singer. Maria Tănase, with strong emotional involvement, reveals the beauty of its melodic line and the sadness that the poem on fleeting life conveys." (Romanian: Cîntec lăutăresc orășenesc de petrecere, larg popularizat nu demult de Ion Crețu, cunoscutul cîntăreț moldovean. Maria Tănase relevă cu puternică participare afectivă frumusețea liniei melodice și tristețea pe care o degajă poezia despre viața trecătoare))

Afterwards the song was performed and recorded many times by lăutari, folk, jazz and pop performers, among them the pop singer Gică Petrescu, the lăutar singer Romica Puceanu, the jazz alto player Anatol Ștefăneț from the Republic of Moldova, the lăutar brass band Fanfare Ciocărlia from Romanian Moldavia (also together with the Bulgarian choir Angelite), the Moldovan jazz singer Geta Burlacu and others. The melody is heard in Emil Loteanu's film Lăutarii (1971). On the Melodiya record with the film's music, the composition, titled "Sudba moya, sestra moya" ("My fate, my sister"), is credited to Eugen Doga.

== Lyrics ==
Version recorded in 1883 by Teodorescu from Petrea Crețul Șolcan
Romanian

Foaie verde mărăcine,
Lume, lume, soro lume,
Drag îmi e să trăiesc bine,
Lume, lume, soro lume.
Frică mi-e că mor ca mâine,
Lume, lume, soro lume,
C-așa-i lumea, trecătoare,
De voinici amăgitoare,
Ca o apă curgătoare:
Unul naște ș-altul moare.

Foaie verde trei căline,
Lume, lume, soro lume,
Când să mă satur de tine,
Lume, lume, soro lume?
De tine m-oi sătura
Când mi-o suna scândura.
Când mi-o face coliva,
Când mi-o curge țarina,
Și popa mi-o descânta
La cap cu cădelnița.

Lume, lume, ce-ai cu mine,
Că mult dor mai ai pe tine,
Și d-ai ținea omu-n floare,
Dar de-i vine moartea, moare;
De s-ar ținea orișicât,
Tot o să meargă la rând.

English translation

Green leaf, buckthorn,
World, world, sister-world,
I love to live well,
World, world, sister-world.
I fear I may die as soon as tomorrow,
World, world, sister-world,
For such is the world, fleeting,
Deceiving the young men,
Like flowing water:
One is born and another dies.

Green leaf, three guelder roses,
World, world, sister-world,
When shall I have had enough of you?
World, world, sister-world.
Of you I shall have had enough
When the board sounds for me,
When the colivă is made for me,
When the earth pours down on me,
And the priest chants over me
At my head with the censer.

World, world, what do you want with me,
For you still carry so much longing,
And though you might keep a man in bloom,
When death comes to him, he dies;
However long he holds out,
He will still go in his turn.

Teodorescu placed the song in the section of "worldly songs" (Romanian: Cântece de lume), which he distinguished from songs of a religious character, and included it among the doinas. He described the doinas as songs prompted by dejection (urât), disappointment, exile, abandonment, spiritual suffering, illness and death.

The version that Teodorescu recorded from Șolcan consists of three stanzas. The first two open with the formula foaie verde ("green leaf") and the name of a plant, mărăcine ("thorny shrub", buckthorn) and trei căline ("three guelder roses"), which sets the rhyme of the following lines, and are interspersed with the refrain "Lume, lume, soro lume". Soro is a variant of the vocative of Romanian: soră ("sister"), while Romanian: lume means "world", "light" and "people", so the singer addresses the world as a sister. In the first stanza he confesses that he loves to live well and fears dying as early as tomorrow: the world is fleeting, deceives the young men (voinici) and is like flowing water – one is born, another dies. In the second stanza the singer asks when he will have had enough of the world, and answers: when the [coffin] board sounds, the colivă is made, the earth pours down and the priest reads over his head with a censer. The third stanza begins with the words "World, what do you want with me?": the world will not keep a man "in bloom" when death comes, he will die, and however long he holds out, he will go in his turn.

In Ion Crețu's 1957 recording the song is structured differently: there is no opening formula, and the question "When shall I have had enough of you?" continues with the condition "when I give up bread and the glass at my lips?" (Romanian: Când oi lăsa sec de pâine/ Și paharul de la gură?) (Note: Romanian: A lăsa sec de... – to stop eating some food, to begin fasting.) The answer of the second stanza is close to Șolcan's version – when the board sounds – but instead of the colivă and the priest there is a grave: "when they lay me in the grave and I am no more on earth". Then follows a stanza on the transience of the world, and a stanza in which the singer says that he will never have enough of his mother and father, his brothers and sisters; the song ends by repeating the first stanza. The same text, without the stanza on the transience of the world, was recorded by Gică Petrescu (1967).

The recordings differ in tone and in their sets of images. In the 1952 recording by the Taraful din Clejani the song is not divided into stanzas: the condition "when I give up bread and olives" is followed by "and then no", and only afterwards does the singer say that he will have had enough when the board sounds. The recording ends with lines saying that the world is false: "they go about to poison you, to take love out of your arms". In Tănase's 1958 recording, titled "Lume, lume", the refrain is soră lume, and the answer to the question begins with the word "perhaps": "perhaps I shall have had enough then, when the board sounds". Fanfare Ciocărlia (2001) performs only the stanza on the fleeting nature of the world and the stanza about parents, brothers and sisters, and addresses the listener as "you": "you will never have enough". The pair of lines about what awaits the one who is born and the one who dies varies between recordings: the dying one always "rots", while the newborn "struggles" (necăjește) in Crețu and Tănase, is "happy" (fericește) in Puceanu, and "feasts" (chefuiește) in Fanfare Ciocărlia.

== Interpretation and reception ==
Romanian scholars note that "secular songs" (cântece de lume) gradually acquired a quasi-folkloric existence: having entered oral circulation, they became subject to the laws of oral creation, and after the fashion that produced them had passed, part of their repertoire lived on in villages, small towns and city outskirts. Of the two thematic directions that took shape in this process, they name first the philosophical song with meditations on the transience of the world, dominated by the desire to live – to live "concretely", to taste the joys of the world. As an example they cite lines of "Lume, lume, soro lume" close to Șolcan's version. Of such verses they write that, permeated by the insatiability of living, they convey a slightly tragic feeling, arising from the unattainable obstinacy of living without limit.

In the liner notes to an edition of Maria Tănase's songs (1977), Tiberiu Alexandru wrote that Tănase conveys, with strong emotional involvement, the beauty of the melody and the sadness of the poem about fleeting life.

The folklorist Ovidiu Papadima argued against the view of the doina as a sad genre. In support, he cites the opening lines of "Lume, lume, soro lume" in Șolcan's version as an example of how dear the world is to the Romanian, with all its faults and hardships. He calls the doina almost a song of the Romanian spring and links the opening formula foaie verde ("green leaf") with the image of the unquenchable rebirth of nature: under the sign of the green leaf, in his words, every doina begins and grows, whether a love song, a shepherd's song or a haiduc song. He concludes his argument with the words: "If the world is our sister, then spring is our mother" (Dacă lumea ne e soră, primăvara ne e mamă).

The Romanian-born German writer Herta Müller, a Nobel Prize laureate, wrote an essay titled "Lume, lume, soro lume" about the song as she heard it sung by Maria Tănase:

"To this day I have not understood […] how these songs manage to console you in their very sorrow. Over the years I have noticed – and not only in myself – that they get the better of melancholy without belittling anything. Perhaps they give support when you are on a knife's edge, and so you come to understand that feeling wears the most beautiful mourning together with reason." (Note: Romanian: „N-am înțeles nici până azi, [...] cum de reușesc aceste cântece să te aline în jalea lor. De-a lungul anilor am observat, și asta nu numai la mine, că ele îi vin de hac melancoliei fără a bagateliza nimic. Poate că ele-ți dau sprijin când te afli pe muchie de cuțit, și-așa ajungi să pricepi că simțirea poartă doliul cel mai frumos cu mintea“.)

— Gerta Müller, Romanian translation from the German, Müller 2011, p. 256

Müller gives her own German rendering of the opening of the song: Welt Welt Schwester Welt/ wann hab ich dich satt/ und die Hand mein Glas vergisst/ wenn das Sargbrett klopft um mich/ vielleicht dann hab ich dich satt/ wer geboren ist verzweifelt/ wer gestorben ist verfault.

== Sources ==
- Teodorescu, Gheorghe Dem (1885). Poezii populare române [Romanian Folk Poems] (in Romanian). București: Tipografia Modernă.
- Brun, Jules (1896a). Le romancero roumain [The Romanian Romancero] (in French). Paris: Alphonse Lemerre.
- Poslușnicu, Mihail Gr. (1928). Istoria musicei la români [History of Music among the Romanians] (in Romanian). București: Cartea Românească.
- Fochi, Adrian, ed. (1968). Bibliografia generală a etnografiei și folclorului românesc (1800–1891) (in Romanian). Vol. I. București: Editura pentru literatură.
- Puceanu, Romica (1969). Romanian Gipsy Songs I (LP cover). Electrecord. ST-C.S. 026.
- Tănase, Maria (1977). Din cîntecele Mariei Tănase (III) (LP booklet) (in Romanian). Electrecord. EPE 0135, EPE 0193, EPE 0221, EPE 0282, EPE 01282.
- Doga, Eugen (1973). Музыка из к.-ф. «Лаутары» [Music from the film Lăutarii] (LP cover) (in Russian). Melodiya. 33Д–00034615.
- Teodorescu, Gheorghe Dem (1985). Antofi, George (ed.). Poezii populare române [Romanian Folk Poems] (in Romanian). Vol. I. București: Editura Minerva.
- Pop, Mihai; Ruxăndoiu, Pavel (1991). Folclor literar românesc [Romanian literary folklore] (in Romanian). București: Editura Didactică și Pedagogică. ISBN 973-30-1130-4.
- Papadima, Ovidiu (1995). O viziune românească a lumii. Studiu de folclor [A Romanian Vision of the World: A Folklore Study] (in Romanian) (2nd ed.). București: Editura Saeculum I.O.
- Ștefăneț, Anatol (1998). Bratsch (CD booklet). Cinq Planètes. CP 01842.
- Teodorescu, Gheorghe Dem. (2000). Petrea Creţul Şolcan: lăutarul Brăilei [Petrea Crețul Șolcan: The Lăutar of Brăila]. Memento (in Romanian). Brăila: Centrul de Creaţie. ISBN 973-99691-1-9.
- Fanfare Ciocărlia (2001). Iag Bari (CD booklet). Piranha. CD-PIR1577.
- Burlacu, Geta (2005). Ce n-aș da (CD booklet) (in Romanian). Music Unlimited.
- Taraful din Clejani (2007). Clejanii de altădată 1949–1952 (CD booklet). Jurnalul Național, Intercont Music. V. 10.
- Müller, Herta (2011). Mereu aceeași nea și mereu același neică [Always the Same Snow and always the same Uncle] (in Romanian). București: Editura Humanitas. ISBN 978-973-689-440-4.
- Rădulescu, Speranța (2022). Pavel, Benedicta; Moisil, Costin (eds.). Peisaje muzicale în România secolului XX [Musical Landscapes in Twentieth-Century Romania] (in Romanian) (2nd revised ed.). București: Editura Universității Naționale de Muzică București. ISBN 978-606-659-137-9.
- Sarău, Gheorghe (2025). Personalități ale rromilor din România și din alte țări [Notable Roma of Romania and Other Countries] (in Romanian). București: Vatra veche. ISBN 978-606-9014-73-8.
