= Stefano Missio =

Stefano Missio (born April 1, 1972, in Udine) is an Italian filmmaker.

He has made various documentaries among which When Italy was not a poor country, about Italy in the 1960s narrated by Joris Ivens, and Scusi, dov'è il Nord Est? produced by Fandango and On Line Productions for Arte (broadcast as Succes à l'italienne) and broadcast in Italy by Tele+. In 2005 he directed Il Ponte, a fiction short-movie, screenplayed by Francesco Tullio Altan, starring Carlo Mazzacurati and Valentina Fago. His last work, Che Guevara - The body and the legend (2007), was broadcast in 12 countries. He lives and works in Paris.

== Filmography ==
- When Italy wasn't a poor country (Quando l'Italia non era un paese povero; 1997)
- Siamo troppo sazi (1998)
- Scusi, dov’è il Nord Est? (2000)
- Il Ponte (2005)
- Trumpets' Republic, (Трубачка Република; 2006)
- Che Guevara - The body and the legend (2007)

== References and sources ==
=== Books ===
- Hans Schoots, Joris Ivens. A Biography of Joris Ivens, Amsterdam, 2000.
- Aldo Grasso, Storia della televisione italiana, Garzanti, Milan, 2000.
- Virgilio Tosi, Cinema e Utopia, Bulzoni, Rome, 2002.

=== Newspapers ===
- Alberto Farassino. Torna l'Italia censurata di Mattei e Joris Ivens. La Repubblica, April 28, 1999.
- Maurizio Porro. Tinto Brass scopre il film verità voluto da Mattei. Corriere della Sera, April 28, 1999.
- Giovanni Petitti. Ivens Ritrovato. Cineforum, n. 374.
- Tom Haines. Laughter reigns, war memories fade at annual Balkans brass festival. The Boston Globe, June 27, 2004.
- Silvana Silvestri. Missio e i misteri di una copia RAI. Il Manifesto, March 30, 2007.
- Lucia Sgueglia. Un'altra Russia. Il Manifesto, December 22, 2007.
