= Šaban Bajramović =

Serbian Romani singer-songwriter (1936–2008)

Šaban Bajramović Шабан Бајрамовић

Background information
- Born: 16 April 1936; Niš, Kingdom of Yugoslavia
- Died: 8 June 2008 (aged 72) Niš, Serbia
- Genres: Romani music; jazz; blues
- Occupation: Singer-songwriter
- Instrument: vocals
- Years active: 1964–2008
- Labels: RTV Ljubljana; Jugoton; PGP RTB; Snail Records

Šaban Bajramović (Serbian Cyrillic: Шабан Бајрамовић, pronounced [ʃǎban bajrǎːmɔʋitɕ]; Romani: Shaban Bajramovičh; 16 April 1936 – 8 June 2008) was a Serbian Romani vocalist and recording artist. He was one of the most internationally critically acclaimed Romani singer-songwriters. Due to his eminent impact on music in Eastern Europe, he was dubbed the "King of Romani music", or the "King of the Gypsies/Gypsy King"

== Biography ==
=== Origin and early life ===
Bajramović was born in Niš into a Muslim Arlije Romani family in the Gypsy quarters (ciganska mahala). He spoke of himself: "I am not Romani, I am a Serb, a Serbian Gypsy". His surname comes from the Turkish word for Eid, which is bayram, the word is used in the Balkan region for Eid and also is a common surname in Muslim communities. He attended primary school in Niš for only the first four years. On quitting school, he picked up his musical education on the street. He was nicknamed "Šabi" (Шаби). His childhood was noted by extreme poverty, thus he worked as a busker to provide an income for his very poor family. In his free time, he enjoyed playing football, but was diagnosed with poliomyelitis as a child, which lead to a decline in his amateur football career.

=== Imprisonment ===
At 19 years he ran away from the army, out of love. As a deserter, he was sentenced to three years in prison on the island of Goli Otok. He spent his time as a good goalkeeper in the prison football team. Because of his nimbleness and speed, they called him "Black Panther". Soon he forced his way into the prison orchestra that played, among other things, jazz (mostly Louis Armstrong, Frank Sinatra, and sometimes John Coltrane) with Spanish and Mexican pieces.

=== Music career ===
After Goli Otok, his intensive music career began. He made his first record in 1964, with the recording act Crna mamba (Black Mamba). He continued to produce music with Crna mamba for 20 years. The highlight of their career was their performance for Indira Gandhi in India, where he gained the title King of Romani music. He also performed to Yugoslav president Josip Broz Tito.

In the early nineties, he recorded "Đelem, Đelem", which is considered the Romani people's ethnic anthem. At the time, he decided to change his stage presence, starting to wear sunglasses while performing.

Since 2000, he started collaborating with Bosnian-based Sevdah act Mostar Sevdah Reunion, which brought him to prominence yet again. In 2001, he recorded the album A Gipsy Legend with the group, released on behalf of World Connection, which gained international attention.

In 2002, he worked with Croatian band Cubismo. Their partnership resulted in the appearance of "Geljan dade", one of Bajramović's best known songs. Published on the album Romano raj, the song was noted for its complex structure and lyrical content. The abstract motif of the song presents suffering people of Romani descent whose fathers went the United States to provide income for their children, ultimately leading to more problems due to their absence. Geljan dade was covered by a wide range of musicians from varying genres, including Gru, Muharem Serbezovski and Boban Zdravković. Zdravković performed the first known version of the song in Serbian, titled "Prokleta je Amerika".

In 2005, Miloš Stojanović and Dragi Šestić directed his biopic film, titled Šaban, which gained notoriety in Eastern Europe. For the purposes of that documentary Dragi Šestić produced the album for Snail Records with the title Šaban. The British magazine Songlines gave the album its special stamp of approval 'Top of the World'.

In 2008, he produced Lova with Serbian hip-hop artist Sky Wikluh for the Serbian TV series Vratice se rode.

=== Last years ===
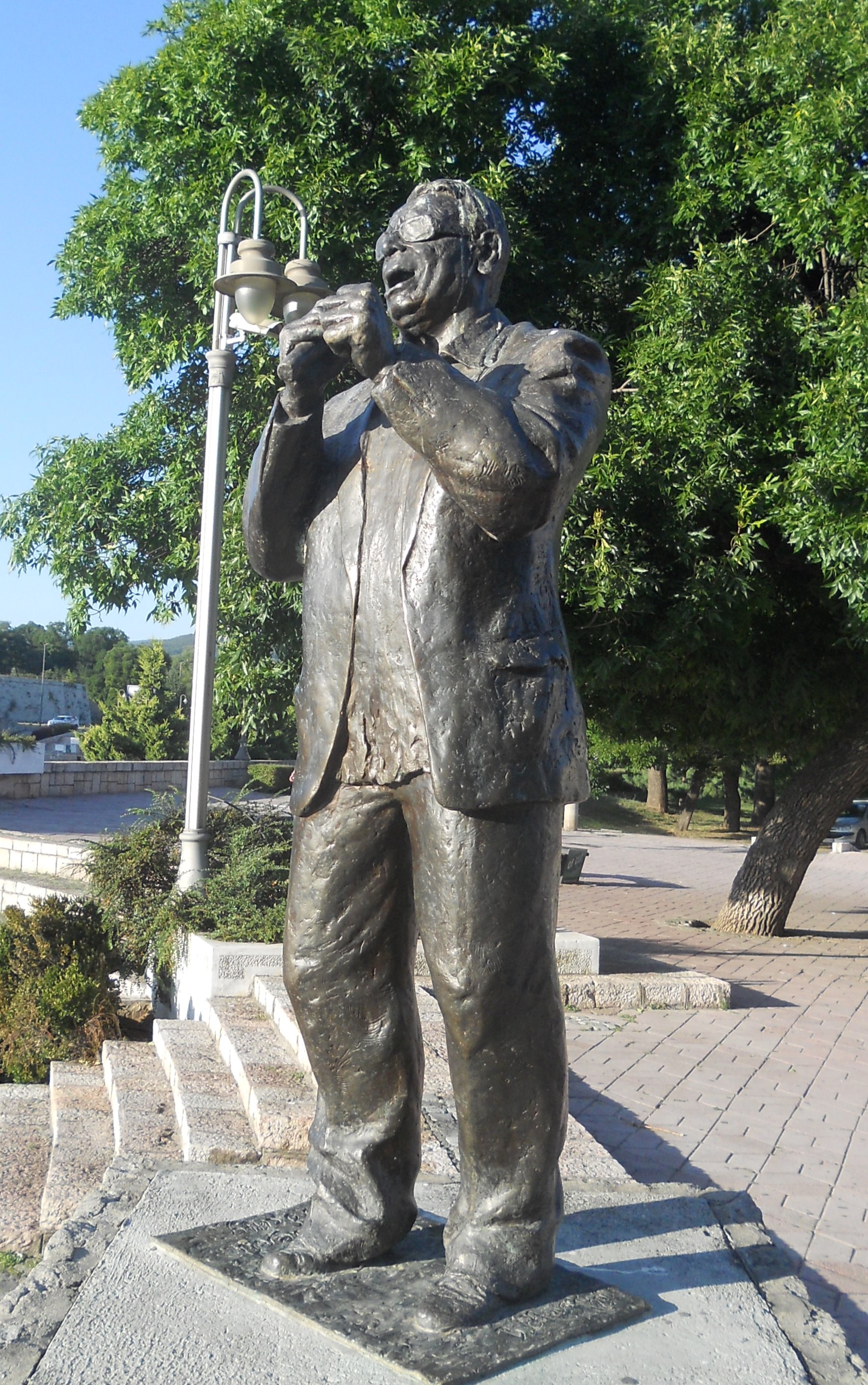
Bajramović's statue in Niš

In 2008, it was revealed that Bajramović was living impoverished in Niš with serious health complications and was no longer able to walk. The government of Serbia intervened to provide him with some funds. He died in Niš on 8 June 2008, from a heart attack.

== Personal life ==
Bajramović enjoyed reading, and claimed he read over 20,000 books. He was married to Milica Bajramović and had four children.

== Legacy ==
=== Influence ===
Bajramović was a prominent figure in Serbian music presenting Romani music in modern Serbian. Due to his enormous influence, on 12 August 2010, a statue to honour his impact was built. The statue had been vandalised multiple times.

Time magazine polled Bajramović in the top 10 best jazz musicians.

== Discography ==
1. Mostar Sevdah Reunion presents Šaban Bajramović: A Gypsy Legend (2001 World Connection)
2. Mostar Sevdah Reunion: Šaban (2006 Snail Records)

=== Quotes ===
Over the years, his music has been constantly stolen, copied, and imitated by both famous and unknown musicians. Promises and contracts have proven worthless. Actually, he's never been interested in protecting his work. Where others would have earned millions, he's lived as he's always lived: from day to day, making music, going wherever he wants, and not recognising any limits at all.

Dragi Šestić – Mostar Sevdah Reunion

Šaban Bajramović is clearly a giant talent, comparable in his own way to Nusrat Fateh Ali Khan or Mari Boine Persen, someone capable of bringing their music to life with such vivid spirituality that it vaults with ease over the most impenetrable cultural barriers. His voice combines the anguish of rai with the soulfulness of fado – a sort of Balkan gypsy jazz

Andy Gill – The Independent, UK, 15 February 2002

== Sources ==
- Драгољуб Б Ђорђевић (2011). Казуј крчмо Џеримо: периферијска кафана и около ње (in Serbian). Službeni Glasnik. pp. 117–121. ISBN 978-86-6055-010-3.
