= Balkan brass =

Style of music from the Balkan region

Balkan brass music
- Stylistic origins: Martial music; folk music
- Cultural origins: 19th century, Revolutionary Serbia and Principality of Serbia
- Typical instruments: Brass instruments

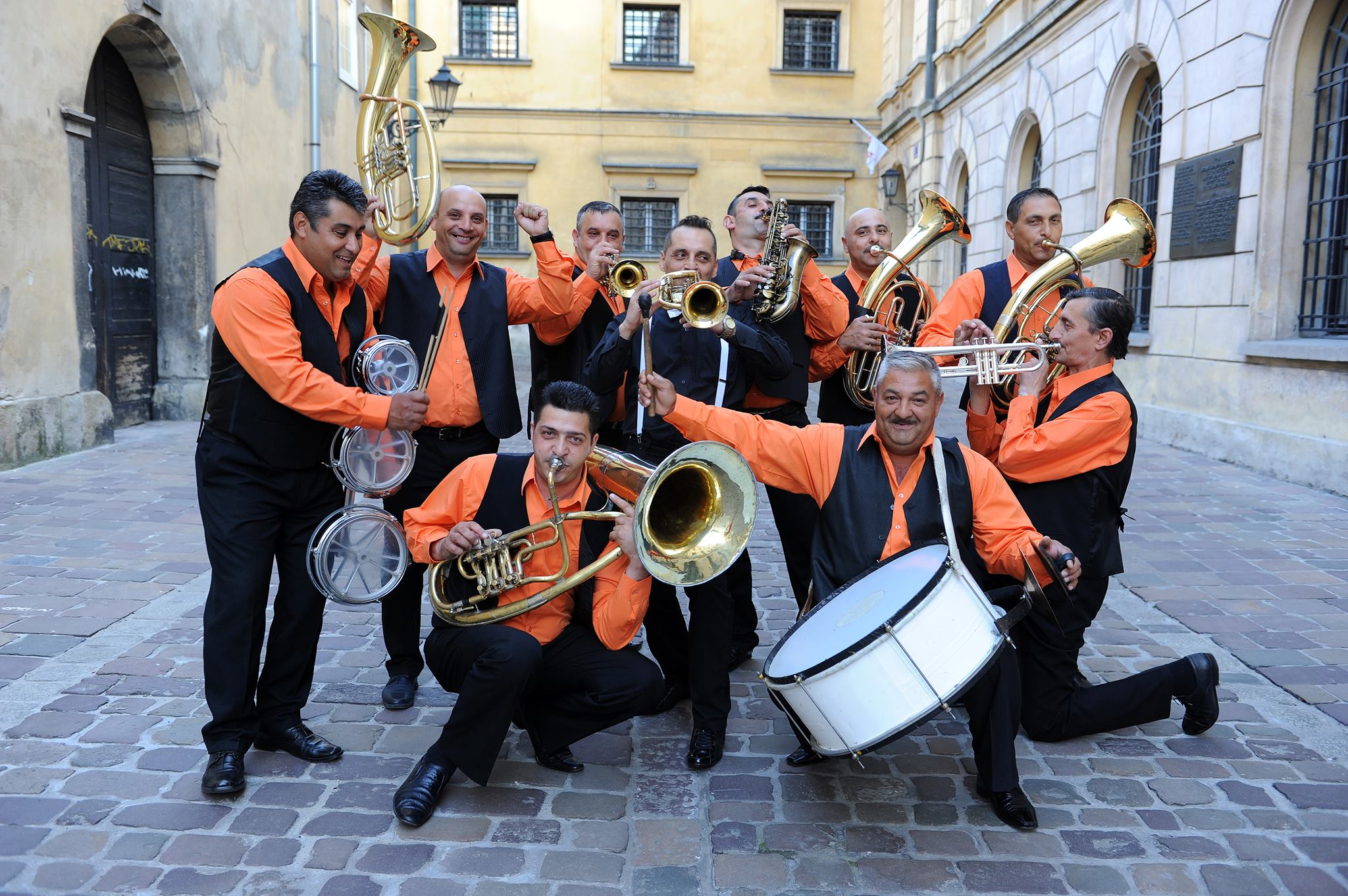
Fanfara Transilvania

Balkan brass, popularly known by the Serbian name Truba (Serbian Cyrillic: Труба, "Trumpet"), is a style of music originating in the Balkan region as a fusion between military music and folk music. It is popular in the Balkans, especially in Serbia, North Macedonia, Bulgaria, Moldova, and Romania.

The style has influenced techno-synth fusion songs as well as pop music songs such as Worth It by Fifth Harmony and Talk Dirty by Jason Derulo.

The fast beats and loud performances encourage dance and audience participation and are egalitarian.

Common dances to the music include a kolo, a traditional South Slavic communal dance.

Performers are called trubači (трубачи) in the Serbo-Croatian, or less commonly, trubari. Romani people have adopted the tradition and make up a large percentage of Balkan brass bands. Notable performers include Goran Bregović, Boban Marković, Fanfare Ciocărlia, and New York-based Balkan Beat Box. The Amsterdam Klezmer Band fused the Balkan sound with other genres including Klezmer, electronic music, and Ska. DJs and producers, most prominently Shantel from Germany, successfully mixed Serbian Brass with electronic beats. DJ Robert Soko's has organized "Balkan Beats" parties in Berlin, Germany, since in 1993.

Through his films including Black Cat, White Cat, Emir Kusturica has made the style popular outside the Balkans.

The biggest brass band event in the world, the Guča Trumpet Festival, is an annual festival in Guča, Serbia.

== History ==
Records show that trumpeters were part of the Serbian army of prince Stefan Vojislav, which defeated the Byzantines in the Battle of Bar on the Rumija mountain in 1042. Together with the drummers, they are mentioned being in the armies of prince Lazar Hrebeljanović and his successors, despots Stefan Lazarević and Đurađ Branković in the 14th and 15th century. During that period, the trumpet was only used as a military instrument.

The music's tradition stems from the First Serbian Uprising led by Karageorge in 1804 (Serbian revolution) when Serbs revolted against the occupying Ottoman Empire, eventually liberating Serbia. The trumpet was used as a military instrument to wake and gather soldiers and announce battles, the trumpet took on the role of entertainment during downtime, as soldiers used it to transpose popular folk songs. When the war ended, the soldiers returned to the rural life; the music became common, accompanying births, baptisms, weddings, the slava (family patron saint day), farewell parties for those joining military service, state and church festivals, harvesting, reaping, and during funerals of family members in the community.

As Serbia was liberated from the Ottoman Empire after the Second Serbian Uprising in 1815, Serbian prince Miloš Obrenović formed the band at his court in Kragujevac. As the new state was still under heavy Ottoman influence, the band played oriental music. It was headed by violin and zurna player, Mustafa. He was titled oberlautar (chief singer) or in Serbian, bukadžija, which literally means the "noise maker". To westernize the state, prince Miloš dismissed Mustafa in 1831 and invited Josif Šlezinger (1794-1870), a musician and composer from Sombor, to form the first military orchestra, with the European instruments, so the trumpet was returned to the orchestras. In 1831, the first official military band was formed by Prince Miloš in Belgrade for use in the Serbian Armed Forces.

Author Momo Kapor wrote: "In Serbia, who from old times new about gusle, shepherd flutes, flutes and dvojnice, the trumpets were accepted after the Serbo-Turkish wars in the late 19th century, when the company and regimental trumpeters returned to their villages, bringing with them their hit, dented, beaten and often bullet pierced trumpets". After the World War I it became the most popular folk instrument, suppressing the previously dominant gaida and violin (in folk music called ćemane). The amateur players were originally taught by the former professional military trumpeters, like Momir Miletić, Momir Subotić and Dojčilo Đukić. The village orchestras were mostly disbanded during the World War II, but after 1945 they were renewed. In time, three schools of brass music developed: eastern (Zaječar, Boljevac), southern (Vranje, Surdulica, Vladičin Han) and western (Užice, Čačak, Požega).

== Instrumentation ==
A brass band is primarily made up of many musicians playing brass instruments such as flugelhorns, trumpets, alto horns, helicons, euphoniums, tenor horns, tubas, baritone horns, wagner tubas, and sometimes trombones. Percussion is provided by snare drum and bass drums, traditionally davuls (also known as tapan or goč) carried by the performers. A few bands occasionally use clash cymbals, or use a snare drum with a suspended cymbal attachment while most bands attach the cymbals to the bass drum.

The music is usually instrumental although sometimes accompanied with singing. Common song forms include the čoček and the Kolo.

== Festivals ==
- Guča trumpet festival, largest trumpet festival in the world, annually in August.
- Balkan Trafik, a yearly three-day Balkan Brass festival in Brussels, Belgium.
- Zlatne Uste Golden Festival, a yearly two-day festival in New York City.
- Guča na Krasu - Guča sul Carso, a yearly three-day festival in Trieste.
- Roma Truba Fest - a yearly festival in Kumanovo, featuring Roma brass players. Usually in September.
- Festival of Brass Orchestras - a yearly festival in Pehčevo. Generally in July.

== In popular culture ==
=== In movies ===
- Time of the Gypsies (Dom za vešanje), 1988, Emir Kusturica
- Underground, 1995, Emir Kusturica
- Black Cat, White Cat, 1998, Emir Kusturica
- Borat, 2006
- Trumpets' Republic, 2006, Stefano Missio and Alessandro Gori
- Guca!, 2006, Dusan Milic

=== In video games ===
- Rabbids Go Home, 2009

=== In TV series ===
- Creature Commandos, 2023

== Notable Balkan brass artists and bands ==
- Boban Marković
- Goran Bregović
- Kočani Orkestar
- Fanfare Ciocărlia
- Taraf de Haïdouks
- Fejat Sejdić
- Slavic Soul Party!

== See also ==
- Mehter
- Balkan music
- Humppa
