= Moj dilbere =

Moj dilbere (English: My Sweetheart or My Darling) is a Bosnian traditional folk and sevdalinka song.

The song is sung from the female point of view, no matter the gender of the singer.

== Origins ==
The song has been in Bosnia since Ottoman times. The exact authors are unknown and Moj dilbere is considered to be a traditional song.

== Lyrics ==
The song is sung from the perspective of a female in the Ottoman Empire.

Original	English translation
Moj dilbere, kud’ se šećeš? Aj, što i mene ne povedeš? Povedi me u čaršiju, Aj, pa me prodaj bazardžiji Uzmi za me oku zlata Aj, pa pozlati dvoru vrata	My darling, where do you betake yourself? Oh, why don't you lead me there too? Lead me to the čaršija Oh, then sell me to the bazaar merchant. Take for me an oka of gold! Oh, then gild the door for the palace!

== Covers ==
Moj dilbere has been covered frequently over the years. Covers have been done by singers from Bosnia, Macedonia, Montenegro, Serbia, The Netherlands and various other countries.

- Alma Subašić
- Amira Medunjanin
- Bele Višnje
- Divlje jagode
- Donna Ares
- Elvira Rahić
- Esma Redžepova
- Hanka Paldum
- Haris Džinović
- Indira Radić
- Jože Privšek
- Ksenija Cicvaric
- Lepa Brena
- Merima Njegomir
- Mostar Sevdah Reunion
- Nada Mamula
- Neda Ukraden
- Nervozni poštar
- Safet Isović
- Saša Matić
- Sead Lipovača
- Silvana Armenulić
- Sofka Nikolić
- Toše Proeski
- Vesna Zmijanac
- Zehra Deović
- Željko Joksimović
- Joost Spijkers

== See also ==
- List of Bosnia and Herzegovina folk songs
- Sevdalinka
- Emina
- Kraj potoka bistre vode
- Sejdefu majka buđaše
