= Mi smo divovi =

Single by Benjamin Isović
- Released: 2009
- Recorded: 2009
- Genre: Pop ballad, Football chant
- Songwriter: Benjamin Isović

Mi smo divovi (English: We Are Giants) is a song released by Bosnian singer-songwriter Benjamin Isović in 2009 which has in subsequent years become the official anthem of Bosnian Football club, FK Sarajevo. Isović, who is the son of Bosnian Sevdah singer Safet Isović, is a supporter of the Sarajevo-based side and president of one of the club's fan associations.

== Lyrics and English translation ==
Original (Bosnian)	English translation
Tajna ljubavi živi u nama u našim snovima i našim pjesmama tajna ljubavi u nama stanuje, s nama spava s nama se budi, s nama putuje Ref. 2x Mi smo divovi, svako nam je plijen naš je cijeli svijet u bordo obojen Ponesi osmijeh svoj, skupi snagu svu vjetru povjeri našu zastavu Naša zakletva ori se ko grom jedan je cilj, jedan je put i samo je jedan dom Ref. 2x Sanjam fanfare, slavlje najveće jesen blistavu i zlatno proljeće stadion Koševo nakrcan ljudima i grb što kuca umjesto srca u našim grudima Ref. 2x Sav je bijeli svijet u bordo obojen Sarajevo	The secret of love lives in us in our dreams and in our songs the secret of love dwells within us, sleeps with us wakes with us, travels with us Chorus (2x) We are giants, everyone is our prey our whole world is colored in maroon Carry your smile, gather all your strength entrust our flag to the wind Our oath roars like thunder there is one goal, one path and only one home Chorus (2x) I dream of fanfares, the greatest celebration bright autumn and golden spring Koševo stadium packed with people and the crest that beats instead of a heart in our chests Chorus (2x) The whole white world is colored maroon — Sarajevo
