= Rade Jovanović (composer) =

- Birth name: Radoslav Jovanović
- Born: 15 April 1928; Goražde, Kingdom of Serbs, Croats and Slovenes
- Died: 15 April 1986 (aged 58); Goražde, SR Bosnia and Herzegovina, SFR Yugoslavia
- Genres: Sevdalinka, folk, Bosnian folk
- Occupation: Composer

Radoslav "Rade" Jovanović (Serbian Cyrillic: Радослав "Раде" Јовановић; 1928–1986) was a Yugoslav composer and songwriter, best known for his legacy collection of sevdalinka folk songs from Bosnia and Herzegovina.

== Biography ==
He attended schools in Goražde and Priboj. With the breakout of the World War II at the age of 13 he joined the Yugoslav partisans. Consequently, some of his songs were dedicated to his brothers in arms. He contracted tuberculosis during imprisonment on Goli Otok during the war but was able to survive harsh conditions of partisans life. After the war he had propelled as a youth leader before being sent to the island of Goli Otok, where he was held as a political prisoner due to the Cominform Resolution. He was released after 18 months and returned to his hometown.

His first successful song was "Često mlađan prošetam kraj Drine". Another one followed "Na obali Drine" performed by Zaim Imamović. Then Nada Mamula sang "Negdje u daljine", and "Sjecaš li se ratni druže" i "Bolan ti ležim jarane" were performed by Gvozden Radičević. Country-wide recognition shortly follows when he wins at the festival Ilidža 1964 with his song "Jablani se povijaju", performed by Safet Isović. That song alone won the awards for melody and lyrics from both - the audience and the nomination committee. His other three songs were also performed that same night and also took other awards. Next year he repeats his success at the very same festival Ilidža 1965, with the song "Ne pitaj me stara majko" performed by Nedeljko Bilkić, and establishes himself as one of the leading folk authors and prolific composer of warm, melodic and distinctive style.

Safet Isović performs "Kad sretneš Hanku" at the Beogradskom Sabor festival in 1970. Seven years later, a number of music critics of former Yugoslavia, in a public poll carried out by the Belgrade Radio, voted and acclaimed "Kad sretneš Hanku" as the folk song of the decade.

His life and work had inspired many theater, film and radio authors who filmed documentaries about him and recorded radio shows, before and after his death, including Šemsudin Gegić and Vehid Gunić. He committed suicide on April 15, 1986, and was buried in his hometown.

== Songs ==
He wrote over 500 songs. The River Drina, Bosnia and Herzegovina, his hometown Goražde and a natural beauty of the countryside to which he was born, people and their lives and fortunes, were source and constant themes and motifs of all Rade's songs, with most popular being:

- Prođoh Bosnom kroz gradove (co-authored with Dragiša Nedović)
- Goražde jedino u srcu mom
- Na obali Drine
- Kad sretneš Hanku
- Šta se ovo Bosnom čuje
- Svjetla moga grada
- Ah, meraka u večeri rane
- Tebi, majko, misli lete
- Ne pitaj me stara majko
- Negdje u daljine
- Jablani se povijaju
- Seja kose raspletala
- Malenim sokakom ne prolazim više
- Sumorna jesen
- Kad u maju ruže procvetaju
- Prolazi jesen
- Bolan ti ležim jarane
- U tuđoj zemlji
- Još ove noći čaše nam dajte
- Sve što mine, povratka mu nema
- Ne mogu te više svojom zvati
- Pomiluj mi pjesmo dušu

== Tributes, memorials and dedications ==
Festival of song and sevdah "Rade Jovanović - Goražde 2005" was sevdah music tribute to Rade Jovanović opus, and was held in his hometown Goražde on 18 June 2005.

On 26 December 2018 memorial plaque was placed on Rade's home, house in Goražde where he was born and spent most of his life until his death in 1986. Idea was initiated by Center for Culture Goražde, while memorial was financed and put up by City of Goražde, with Missis Jovanović and mayor of Goražde, Muhamed Ramović, being one who officially unveiled it.
