= Vino piju nane age Sarajlije =

Bosnian folk music genre

Vino piju nane age Sarajlije (English: Wine is Drunk, Mother, by the Sarajevan Aghas) is a Bosnian traditional sevdalinka. The song is associated with the Sarajevo region and is known for its humorous and romantic portrayal of social life among Sarajevo’s Ottoman-era elite. The lyrics follow a poetic and narrative structure, describing a gathering of local age (aghas or Ottoman lords) in Ilidža, near Sarajevo, where they are served wine by a witty and selective young woman. The final stanza humorously asserts the woman’s autonomy, declaring she will only be the lover of one: Pinjo, the flag-bearer (Bosnian: bajraktar).

== Origins ==
The origins of Vino piju nane age Sarajlije are not precisely documented, as with many sevdalinkas, but it is widely considered a part of the oral musical tradition passed down through generations in Bosnia and Herzegovina. The song reflects the aesthetics of sevdah, focusing on themes of flirtation, status, and honor, often laced with subtle satire. The song remains popular in Bosnia and Herzegovina and other regions of the former Yugoslavia.

== Umihana Čuvidina version ==
There exists a lesser-known version of the song attributed to the early 19th-century Bosnian poetess Umihana Čuvidina, widely regarded as the first known female sevdalinka poet. While this version differs in lyrical structure and tone, it retains the core themes of longing and social commentary found in traditional sevdalinka. Čuvidina’s authorship, though not universally confirmed, reflects the oral and adaptive nature of the genre, where songs were often shaped by regional, personal, and historical variations.

== Covers ==
- Branimir Štulić
- Divanhana featuring Bradley Dean (2018)
- Himzo Polovina
- Safet Isović
- Zehra Deović
- Hanka Paldum

== In popular culture ==
In 2018, the Sarajevo-based band Divanhana collaborated with Broadway actor Bradley Dean to perform a theatrical version of Vino piju nane age Sarajlije. The performance was supported by the U.S. Embassy in Sarajevo and was intended to promote cultural exchange between Bosnian sevdah and American musical theatre. The phrase “age Sarajlije” from the song has entered local vernacular and inspired a nickname for the football club FK Sarajevo, whose supporters are sometimes referred to as the “Sarajevan Aghas” (Bosnian: Age Sarajlije).

== See also ==
- Sevdalinka
- Bosnian folk music
- Ilidža
- FK Sarajevo
