= Beba Selimović =

Bosnian singer (1936–2020)

- Selimović in 1964

Background information
- Also known as: First Lady of Sevdah
- Born: Izeta Selimović; 27 March 1936; Trebinje, Kingdom of Yugoslavia
- Died: 10 March 2020 (aged 83) Sarajevo, Bosnia and Herzegovina
- Genres: Bosnian folk; sevdalinka
- Occupation: singer
- Instrument: vocals
- Years active: 1954-2020
- Labels: Jugoton; Diskos; Beograd Disk; RTV Ljubljana

Izeta "Beba" Selimović (27 March 1936 – 10 March 2020) was a Bosnian sevdalinka-folk singer and was one of the leading female singers of the 1950s, 1960s and 1970s in Yugoslavia, along with Zehra Deović, Nada Mamula and Silvana Armenulić.

== Early life and family ==
Selimović was born on 27 March 1936 in Trebinje, Bosnia and Herzegovina, while it was a part of the Kingdom of Yugoslavia. The Selimović family originally hails from Bileća. Being the youngest of five children in a Bosniak family, she was called beba (baby) by her older siblings and took that as her stage name when she became a professional singer.

At the age of seven, Selimović moved to Sarajevo with her family in 1943, during World War II, where she completed her schooling.

== Career ==
Aged 17, Selimović was one of six people chosen out of 300 candidates to sing for Radio Sarajevo, which kicked off her professional career in 1954 as a soloist for the station. Her first single, "Po mojoj bašti zumbuli cvjetaju" ("In My Garden Hyacinths Bloom"), was released in 1958. She retired in 1988 following the release of her final studio album. Although her recorded songs have appeared on many compilation albums since the late 1980s, she did not record any new music since then.

During her long career, Selimović sang exclusively in two genres: Bosnian folk and sevdalinka. She recorded songs with multiple Bosnian sevdalinka singers such as Zaim Imamović, Zehra Deović, Nada Mamula, Safet Isović and Meho Puzić. She was good friends with Isović and Puzić until their deaths in 2007.

== Personal life ==
Selimović married in 1958 at age 19, became a mother at the age of 20 and was later widowed at age 32 when her husband Sabrija died in a car crash in October 1971. She and her husband had two sons together, Samir and Senad. Her second marriage was to violinist Dževad Šabanagić. The couple lived in Sarajevo and they survived the Siege of Sarajevo during the war in Bosnia and Herzegovina. She was one of the speakers at the funeral for Safet Isović on 3 September 2007.

Although retired from public life and opting to rarely grant interviews, she agreed to be interviewed for a November 2014 article with the newspaper Dnevni avaz. Selimović said that she had retired years ago and ignored requests to perform on television, saying she had given the opportunity to younger generations to "continue."

== Death ==
Selimović died on 10 March 2020 in her sleep, at the age of 83. She was buried in a Muslim funeral at Sarajevo's Bare Cemetery on 12 March 2020.

== Discography ==
=== Extended plays ===
- Po mojoj bašti zumbuli cvjetaju (1958)
- Danju slušam pjesme tužne (1960)
- Kiša pada, trava raste (1962)
- Put putuje Latif aga (1962)
- Sarajevo na visokom gledu (1963)
- Djevojka viče s visoka brda (1963)
- Tugo moja (1964)
- Sedamdeset i dva dana (1964)
- Banja Luko i ravnine tvoje (1965)
- Dva su cvijeta u bostanu rasla (1965)
- Hajde dušo da ašikujemo (1965)
- Kraj potoka bistre vode (1966)
- Tiho teci vodo Mošćanice (1967)
- Vrati mi se, ljubavi (1968)
- Sitna kiša rosila (1968)
- Mene moja majka gleda sa čardaka (1969)
- Što te nisam dragi srela davno (1970)
- O šuti šuti srce moje (1970)
- Na zemlji se jednom diše (1970)
- Plačem ja, plači ti (1971)
- Oprosti, oprosti (1972)
- Ostaje još jedan dug (1972)
- U srcu mome živiš samo ti (1972)
- Zbogom (1973)
- Pruži mi ruke (1974)
- Za kim tvoje srce plače (1975)
- Samo ti (1975)
- Tužno je nebo ljubavi (1977)
- Svu noć sam te čekala (1978)
- Voljeni, ljubljeni (1979)

=== Studio albums ===
- Mene majka gleda sa čardaka (1971)
- Od sevdaha goreg jada nema (1979)
- U srcu mome živiš samo ti (1984)
- Gorom jezde kićeni svatovi (1988)

=== Compilation albums ===
- Sve behara... (1981)
- Najveći hitovi (2012)
