= Benjamin Isović =

Bosnian singer-songwriter and poet (born 1962)

- Born: 9 September 1962 (age 63); Sarajevo, SR Bosnia and Herzegovina, Socialist Federal Republic of Yugoslavia
- Genres: Sevdalinka, folk
- Occupations: Singer-songwriter and poet
- Years active: 1989–present

Benjamin Isović (born 9 September 1962) is a Bosnian singer-songwriter and poet. His father was Safet Isović, a Sevdalinka singer.

== Career ==
In 2008, when Republika Srpska was looking for entries for a new regional anthem, Isović and Bosnian national anthem composer Dušan Šestić submitted an entry, "Мајко земљо" ("Mother Earth") as a contender, though ultimately it was not chosen. In the late 2000s, Šestić and Isović also wrote a set of lyrics for the wordless Bosnian national anthem, although they were not adopted.

== Discography ==
=== Vocals ===
- Male priče o velikim ljubavima (1989)
- Male priče o Pišonji i Žugi (2004)
- Za njom plaću crne oči (1993)
- Obriši suze baksuze (1994)
- Nije čudo što te volim ludo (1999)
- Ostarit ćemo (2000)
- Prezime (2002)
- Zbog ljubavi (2005)
- I ovako i onako (2007)
- Mi smo divovi (2009)
- Poljubi me (2009) ft. Sabrina
- Ponovo se volimo (2011)

=== Instruments and performance ===
- Bosnian Music 16 CD (Bosanskohercegovačko Muzičko Naslijeđe – Bosnian Music Heritage) (2010)

=== Writing and arrangement ===
- Boris I Noćna Straža – Obojeni Snovi (1989)
- Boris* – The Best Of (1995)
- Safet Isović – Šehidski Rastanak (1996)
- Bona Ne Bila (1996)
- Legenda O Bosni – Legend Of Bosnia (2003)
- Što Je S Princezom Moje Vrele Mladosti (U Tvojim Očima) (2003)
