= Emina (poem) =

1902 Bosnian poem and folk song

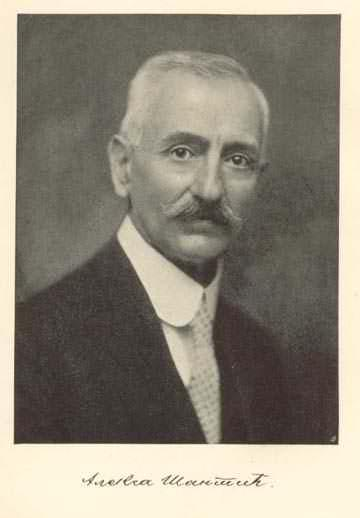
Aleksa Šantić, author of Emina

"Emina" (Cyrillic: Емина) is a poem by Herzegovinian Serb poet Aleksa Šantić that became a popular sevdalinka song, covered by many prominent singers from Bosnia and Herzegovina and other parts of former Yugoslavia. It was first published in 1902 in the Serbian literary journal Kolo. The subject of the poem is Šantić's neighbor, a young Bosnian Muslim woman named Emina Sefić. It is one of the most well-known sevdalinka songs of all time.

== Main character ==
Emina Sefić (later Koluder; 1884–1967) was born to a Bosnian Muslim and ethnically Bosniak family in the city of Mostar, Bosnia and Herzegovina. Her father was a prominent imam and the family lived in the Mostar's Old Town near the Stari Most bridge. The family's household was next door to that of a sister of poet Aleksa Šantić. Emina's great-granddaughter is famous Bosnian soprano, Alma Ferović, who during her career collaborated and performed with the likes of Elton John and A.R. Rahman.

== Statue ==
On 27 May 2010, a bronze statue of Emina was unveiled in Mostar. It was unveiled on Šantić's 142nd birthday, although it's not publicly known if that was intentionally done or coincidental. The Emina statue was sculpted by Zlatko Dizdarević over the period of three months and was not based on photographs of her, rather the author's "artistic vision of a Bosnian beauty". The statue was sculpted with clothing that women wore in Bosnia and Herzegovina at the turn of the century.

== Lyrics ==
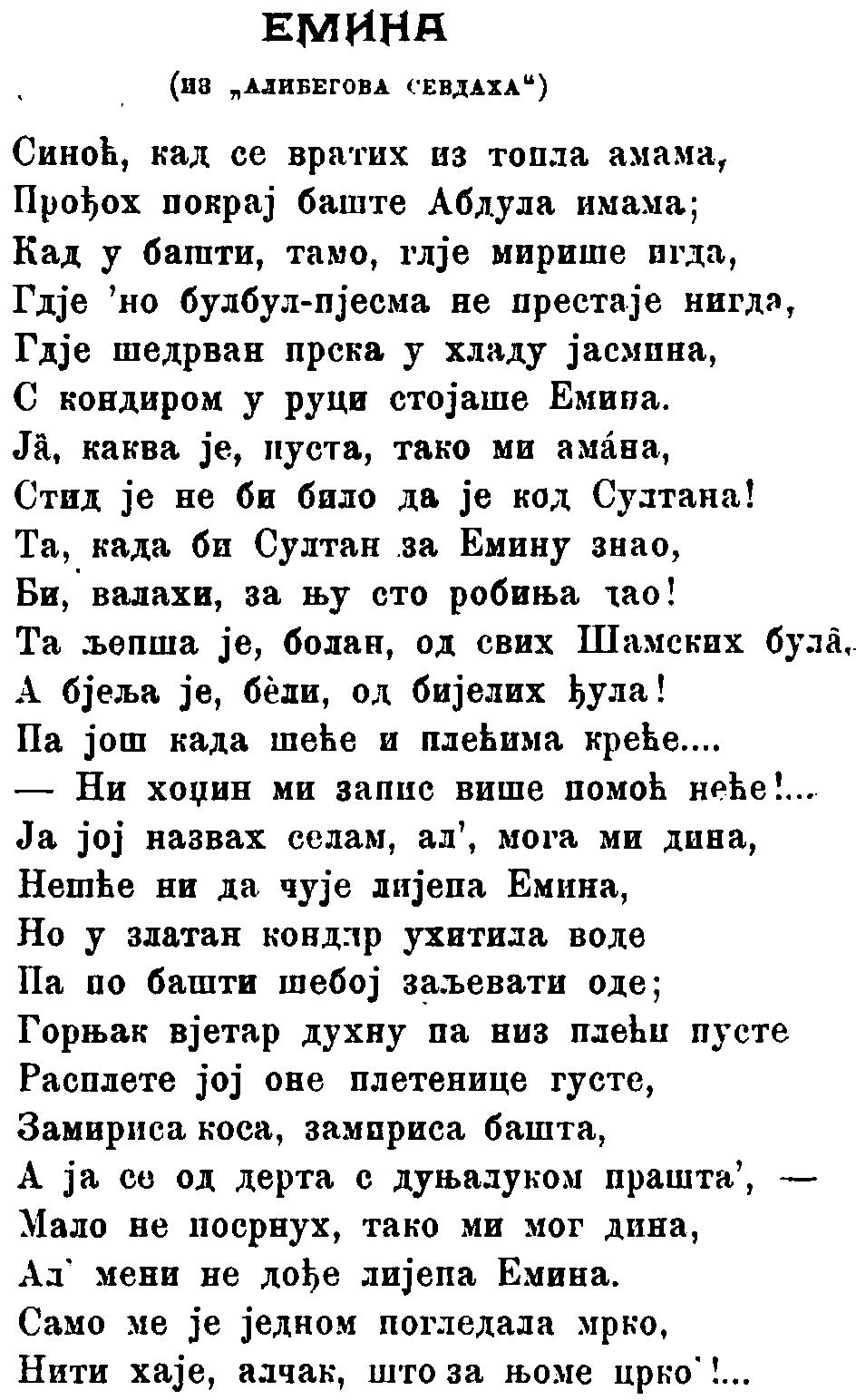
The original, longer version of Emina, published in the Serbian journal Kolo in 1902

Serbo-Croatian	English translation
Sinoć kad se vraćah iz topla hamama, prođoh pokraj bašče staroga imama. Kad tamo u bašči, u hladu jasmina s ibrikom u ruci stajaše Emina. Ja kakva je pusta! Tako mi imana, stid je ne bi bilo da je kod sultana. Pa još kada šeće i plećima kreće, ni hodžin mi zapis više pomoć' neće! Ja joj nazvah selam. Al' moga mi dina, ne šće ni da čuje lijepa Emina, već u srebrn ibrik zahvatila vode, pa niz bašču đule zaljevati ode. S grana vjetar puhnu, pa niz pleći puste rasplete joj njene pletenice guste. Zamirisa kosa, k'o zumbuli plavi, a meni se krenu bururet u glavi! Malo ne posrnuh, mojega mi dina, al' meni ne dođe lijepa Emina. Samo me je jednom pogledala mrko, niti haje, alčak, što za njome crko'!	Last night, returning from the warm hamam I passed by the garden of the old Imam And lo, in the garden, in the shade of a jasmine, There with a pitcher in her hand stood Emina. What beauty! By iman I could swear, She would not be ashamed if she were at the sultan’s! And the way she walks and her shoulders move... -- Not even an Imam’s amulet could help me! I offered her salaam, but by my dīn, Beautiful Emina would not even hear it. Instead, scooping water in her silver pitcher, Around the garden she went to water the roses. A wind blew from the branches down her lovely shoulders Unraveling those thick braids of hers. Her hair gave off a scent of blue hyacinths, Making me giddy and confused! I nearly stumbled, I swear by my faith, But beautiful Emina did not come to me. She only gave me a frowning look, Not caring, the naughty one, that I am crazy for her!

Many artists have covered the song, but the version by fellow Mostar native, Bosnian singer Himzo Polovina, remains the most popular. Upon hearing of the death of Emina Sefić, Polovina went to poet Sevda Katica's home in the Mostar neighbourhood Donja Mahala. He found her in the yard of the family home, informed her of Emina's death and she shuddered with grief and spoke the verses:

New verses	Translation
Umro stari pjesnik, umrla Emina ostala je pusta bašća od jasmina salomljen je ibrik uvelo je cvijeće pjesma o Emini, nikad umrijet neće.	The old poet has died, Emina has died The empty garden of jasmine was left behind The pitcher is broken The flowers have withered The song about Emina, will never die.

Himzo Polovina recorded the song and added Sevda's new verses.

== Legacy ==
Some have suggested adopting the words from "Emina" as the lyrics for the wordless Bosnian national anthem, due to its connection to Bosniaks, Croats, and Serbs (the three main Bosnian ethnic groups) alike.

== Covers ==
- Amira Medunjanin
- Divanhana
- Himzo Polovina
- Maja Milinković
- Ibrahim Jukan
- Ibrica Jusić
- Nedeljko Bilkić
- Nihad Hrustanbegovic
- Saša Matić
- Božo Vrećo
- Predrag Cune Gojković

== See also ==
- List of Bosnia and Herzegovina folk songs
- Sevdalinka
- Kraj potoka bistre vode
- Moj dilbere
- Sejdefu majka buđaše
