= Most (magazine) =

Most: časopis za obrazovanje, nauku i kulturu
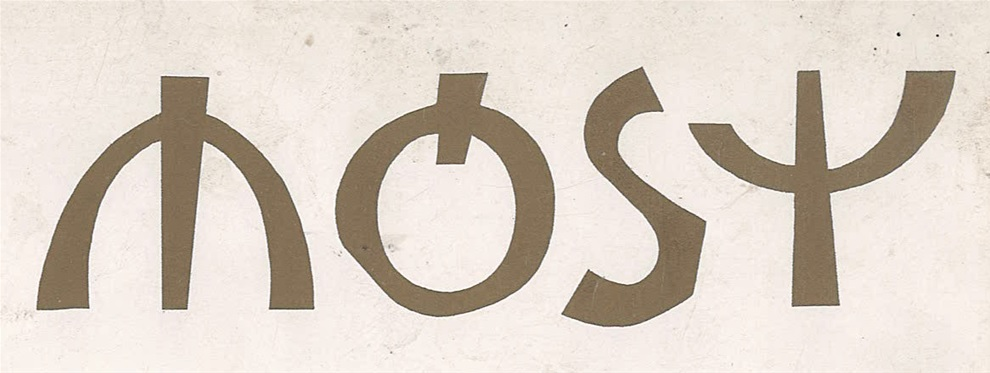
- Editor-in-Chief: Alija Kebo
- Categories: literature / culture / society
- Frequency: quarterly (1974-2000), monthly (2001-2007)
- Format: A4
- Circulation: ?
- Publisher: from XXI, No. 91 (1995): Okrug Mostar; from XXII, No. 94 (1996): NIP "BiH perspektive"; from XXII, No. 96 (1996): Narodna biblioteka Mostar; from XXIV, No. 103-104 (1998): Društvo pisaca BiH, Podružnica Hercegovačko-neretvanskog kantona; from XXIV, No. 105 (1998): Podružnica pisaca HNK
- Founder: Savez zajednica kulture za Hercegovinu [Association of Culture Communities for Herzegovina]
- Founded: 1974
- First issue: 1974
- Final issue: 2008
- Country: Bosnia
- Based in: Mostar
- Language: Serbo-Croatian
- Website: http://www.most.ba/arhiva.aspx
- ISSN: 0350-6517
- OCLC: 643402153

Most was a magazine published in Mostar, in Bosnia and Herzegovina, from 1974 to 2008. During the Bosnian War, the magazine was not published for the period between 1992 and 1994. Since 1998, the subtitle of the magazine has been "magazine for education, science and culture". The magazine was published quarterly and monthly. It is printed in both scripts used in Bosnia and Herzegovina, Latin and Cyrillic. Alija Kebo, who was embodiment of the magazine and cultural life of Mostar, was also editor for decades. After Kebo's death in 2007, the magazine and the oldest poetry and literary event in the Balkans, Šantićeve večeri poezije (transl. Šantić's Poetry Evenings), were both ceased to exist.

Most enduring editor was late Alija Kebo, who edited more than 120 issues. Magazine also offered space for upstart poets and writers. Along with Šantić's Poetry Evenings, it was most important outlet for cultural and artistic production in the city and the region.

German Union Catalogue include the magazine among most important printed journals in Slavic Studies.

== Publishers ==
Over the years several publishing companies worked on publishing the magazine:

- From I, no. 1 (1974) publisher: Association of Cultural Communities for Herzegovina
- Since XXI, no. 91 (1995) publisher: Okrug Mostar
- From XXII, no. 94 (1996) publisher: NIP "BiH perspectives"
- From year XXII, no. 96 (1996) publisher: Narodna biblioteka Mostar
- From XXIV, no. 103-104 (1998) publisher: Society of Writers of Bosnia and Herzegovina - Branch of Herzegovina-Neretva Canton
- Since XXIV, no. 105 (1998) publisher: Branch of Writers of Herzegovina-Neretva Canton

== See also ==
- OKC Abrašević
