= Sejdefu majka buđaše =

Bosnian folk song

Sejdefu majka buđaše (English: Seydefa's Mother Wakes Her) is a Bosnian (Bosnia and Hercegovina) traditional folk and sevdalinka song.

== Origins ==
Sejdefu majka buđaše is a traditional song that is believed to have originated in Sarajevo centuries ago, while the region of Bosnia was a part of the Ottoman Empire. The exact author is unknown.

Over the centuries, the song spread amongst the Bosniak populations in Podgorica and the Sandžak regions of Montenegro and Serbia.

== Lyrics ==
Original	English translation
Sejdefu majka buđaše ustani kćeri moja, Sejdefo Zar misliš majko da ja spim ja ti se mlada s dušom dijelim zovi mi majko komšije i prvo moje gledanje što smo se majko gledali u šajku lađu na more	Sejdefa's mother wakes her Rise, my daughter Sejdefa! Do you think, mother that I'm asleep? At this young age, I'm parting with my soul. Call the neighbors, mother And my first love. The one whose eyes met mine On a boat out at sea.

== Covers ==
- Sinan Alimanović
- Amira Medunjanin
- Ana Bekuta
- Hanka Paldum
- Ksenija Cicvarić
- Lepa Brena
- Merima Njegomir
- Neda Ukraden
- Silvana Armenulić
- Snežana Đurišić
- Suzan Kardeş
- Zehra Deović

== In popular culture ==
It was sung by Kosovo-born singer Suzan Kardeş on the Turkish soap opera Muhteşem Yüzyıl (called Sulejman Veličanstveni in the former Yugoslav countries and Magnificent Century in English) in the 44th episode of the series that aired in January 2012.

== See also ==
- List of Bosnia and Herzegovina folk songs
- Sevdalinka
- Emina
- Moj dilbere
