= Rade Jovanović =

Rade Jovanović may refer to:

- Radovan Jovanović (1904–1941), Serbian partisan, national hero of Yugoslavia
- Rade Jovanović (composer) (1928–1986), Bosnian collector and composer of folk music
- Rade Jovanović (singer) (born 1971), Serbian singer and poet
- Rade Jovanović (basketball), Serbian basketball player who played for Red Star Belgrade during 1940s.
