= Mene majka gleda sa čardaka =

Studio album by Beba Selimović
- Released: 23 September 1971
- Genre: Bosnian folk; sevdalinka
- Label: Jugoton

Beba Selimović chronology
Plačem ja, plači ti (1971)	Mene majka gleda sa čardaka (1971)	Oprosti, oprosti (1972)

Mene majka gleda sa čardaka (Mother Watches Me From the Pergola) is the 26th release and first studio album by Bosnian sevdalinka and folk singer Beba Selimović, following nearly two decades of only releasing singles and extended plays. It was released 23 September 1971 through the label Jugoton.

== Track listing ==
No.	Title	Writer(s)	Length
1.	"Mene majka gleda sa čardaka" (Mothers Watches Me From the Pergola)	Jozo Penava
2.	"Ah, ljubav, ljubav" (Oh, Love, Love)	Selver Pašić; Ismet Alajbegović
3.	"O, ćuti, ćuti, sad srce moje" (Quiet, Quiet Now, Oh Heart of Mine)	Irfan Ajanović; Branko Glumac
4.	"Plačem ja, plačeš ti" (I Cry, You Cry)	Milan Petrović; Damjan Babić
5.	"Dani dugi" (Long Days)	Nikola Škrba
6.	"U proljeće mirisno" (In the Fragrant Springtime)	Rade Vidić; Spaso Berak
7.	"Prolaze dani" (The Days Pass)	Petrović; Blagoje Košanin
8.	"Mene moja zaklinjala majka" (My Mother Swore Me)	Penava
9.	"Tugo moja" (My Sorrow)	Alajbegović; Škrba
10.	"Tecite, suze" (Run, Tears)	Zorica Đuđić; Aca Stepić
11.	"Dođi mi, proljeću mladosti" (Come to Me, Springtime of My Youth)	Safet Kafedžić; Alajbegović
12.	"Uspomeno, uspomeno" (Memory, Memory)	Petrović; Košanin

== Personnel ==
=== Crew ===
- Mario Lozić – design
- Marko Čolić – design
