= Kiša pada, trava raste =

EP by Beba Selimović
- Released: 1962
- Genre: Bosnian folk
- Label: Diskos

Beba Selimović chronology
Danju slušam pjesme tužne (1960)	Kiša pada, trava raste (1962)	Put putuje Latif aga (1962)

Kiša pada, trava raste (The Rain Falls, the Grass Grows) is the third release and third gramophone record by Bosnian folk singer Beba Selimović. It was released in 1962 through the label Diskos.

== Track listing ==
No.	Title	Writer(s)	Length
1.	"Kiša pada, trava raste" (The Rain Falls, the Grass Grows)	Traditional
2.	"Kao rumen cvijet" (Like a Florid Flower)	Zaim Imamović
3.	"Stara majka mene pita" (My Elderly Mother Asks Me)	Radojka Živković
4.	"O, jeseni, jeseni" (Oh, Autumn, Autumn)	Jozo Penava

== Personnel ==
- Orkestar Radojke Živković – orchestra
