= Sofka Nikolić =

Bosnian and Yugoslav singer

Sofka Nikolić (Serbian Cyrillic: Софка Николић; 1907 – 27 July 1982) was a Serbian and Yugoslav singer of folk music considered to be the first major music star in Yugoslavia. She recorded over 55 LP records.

== Biography ==
She started to sing as a minor at local fairs and events and she later went on to sing in kafanas of Sarajevo and Mostar, where she was best-known for performance of Bosnian love songs sevdalinkas. The first LP by Nikolić was recorded in 1927 and it contained several hits like Kolika je Jahorina planina and Kad bi znala, dilber Stano.

Her major concerts were in the 1920s, after which she moved to Belgrade and married fellow musician Paja Nikolić. His orchestra was a regular on Nikolić's concert tours, including a number of concerts abroad in Sofia, Berlin, Prague, Moscow, Vienna, Budapest, Madrid, London, Rome and Paris. Sofka Nikolić's musical adaptations of folk poems and original compositions attracted a large number fans. Her songs was praised by Josephine Baker, Aleksa Šantić, Branislav Nušić and other famous artists.

Nikolić had one daughter who died in an accident in 1936, after which Nikolić retired from public life.

A street in Bijeljina is named after her.

== Selected singles ==
- Ali paša na Hercegovini
- Cojle, Manojle
- Kolika je Jahorina planina
- Kad bi znala, dilber Stano
- Moj dilbere
- Čuješ seko
- Igrali se vrani konji
- Ja nabacih udicu
- Lijepa li je u Alage ljuba
- Zapevala bulbul ptica
- Zone, mori Zone
- Zulfe, mori Zulfe
- Od kako je Banja Luka postala
- Oj Boga ti, siva ptico sokole
- Sagradiću šajku
- Svu noć mlada
- Uzmi sine Stanu
- Tri put ti čuknam
- Po mesečini, kraj šimšira
