= Meho Puzić =

Background information
- Born: 24 July 1937; Odžak, Kingdom of Yugoslavia
- Died: 25 June 2007 (aged 69) Odžak, Bosnia and Herzegovina
- Genre: Bosnian folk · sevdalinka
- Occupation: musician
- Years active: 1966–2007
- Labels: Jugoton, PGP RTB, Diskos, Embex

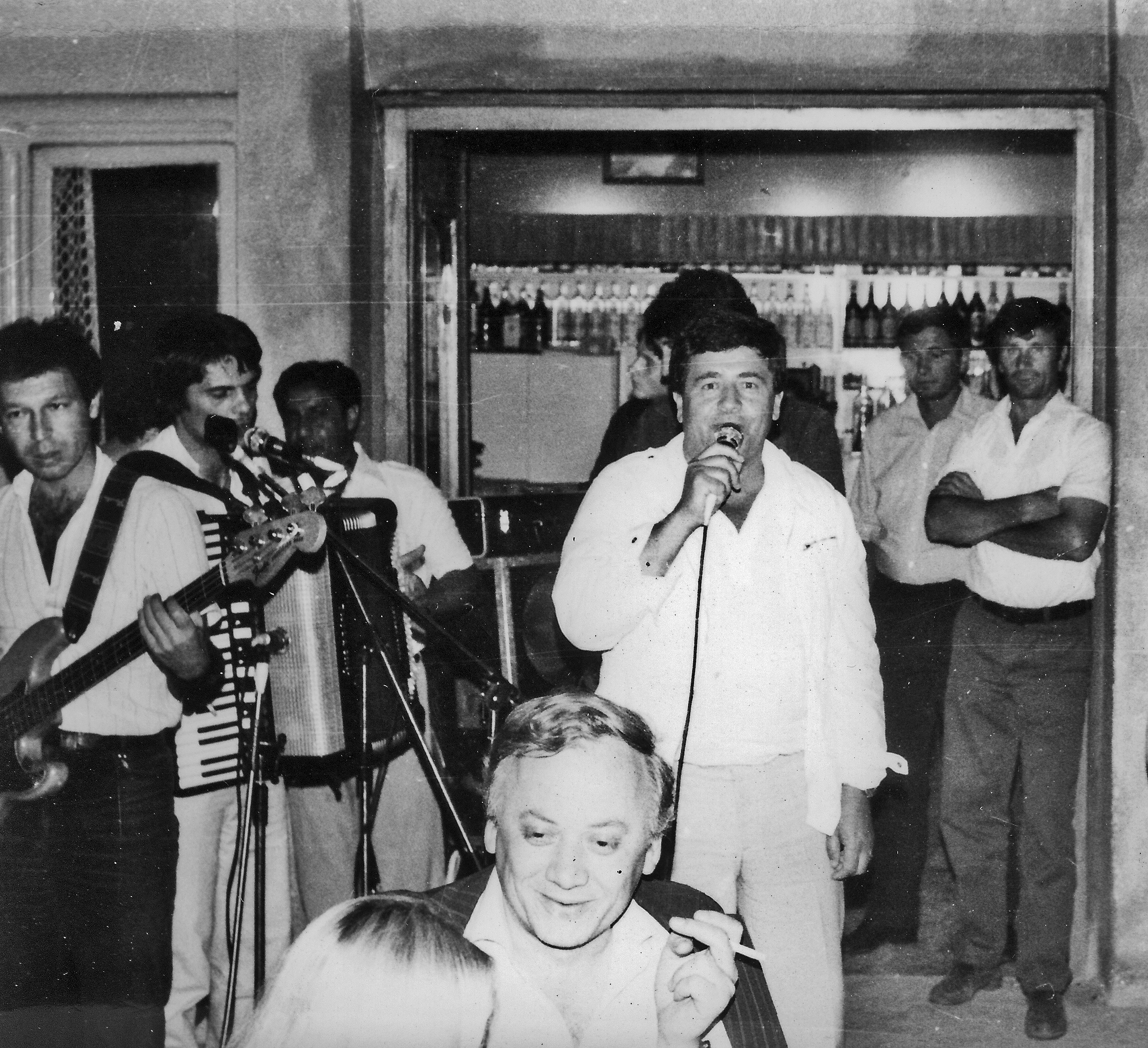
Puzić performing in Niš, early 1980s.

Mehmed "Meho" Puzić (24 July 1937 – 25 June 2007) was a Bosnian sevdalinka-folk singer and songwriter.

== Early life ==
Meho Puzić was born on 24 July 1937 in the town of Odžak, into a Bosniak family. He had two brothers named Adem and Bahrija. The latter was also a professional singer. Meho and Bahrija recorded two songs together, "Pjevaj brate" (Sing, Brother) and "Ko čaršijom konja jaše" (Who is Riding a Horse Down the Bazaar), and released them on an extended play titled Meho i Bahrija Puzić in 1974.

== Career ==
He worked as a bricklayer before becoming a professional singer and releasing his first single in 1966. In 1969, Toma Zdravković wrote a song entitled Majko, majko (Mother, Mother) for him. Puzić sang the song in a duet with his wife Hanka.

== Death ==
Meho Puzić died, holding his wife Hanka's hand, on 25 June 2007, a month shy of his 70th birthday. He died a little over two months before his colleague and friend Safet Isović's death on 2 September 2007.

Puzić was buried the day after his death in his hometown of Odžak. His funeral was attended by Hanka Paldum, Beba Selimović, Azemina Grbić, Emina Zečaj, Elvira Rahić, Jasmin Muharemović, Husein Kurtagić (1938–2008) and Omer Pobrić (1945–2010), among others.

== Discography ==
| Tracks | Released |
|---|---|
| Bosanske pjesme pjeva: 1. Mehmeda majka budila 2. Na dar tebi, draga moja 3. Platno bijeli Sarajka djevojka 4. Kad niz sokak ideš | February 1966 |
| Stani vjetre, stani malo: 1. Stani vjetre, stani malo 2. Pogaženo cvijeće moje 3. Sivi oblak lutalica stara 4. Mjesečino sjajna | 1966 |
| Lijepa Suada: 1. Lijepa Suada; 2. Odavno te moje oči traže 3. Srce pita dal' ćeš doći 4. Iz malenog mog sokaka | March 1967 |
| Ilidža '67: 1. U proljeće kad vjetrić zapiri | 1967 |
| Drugovi: 1. Drugovi; 2. Gonđe Ajko; 3. Bol za majkom 4. O, Ivane, Ivane | 1967 |
| Ja se želim ocem zvati: 1. Ja se želim ocem zvati 2. Ništa lijepše od ljubavi nema 3. Haj, kako bih sretan bio 4. Želio sam da me voliš | 1968 |
| Beogradski sabor: 1. Šta se ono tamo zbiva | 1968 |
| Ako nećeš ti, hoće druge tri: 1. Ako nećeš ti, hoće druge tri 2. Tamo negdje u Bosni daleko 3. Spremite momci...; 4. Pišite majci... | March 1969 |
| Pjesmo, živote moj / Ko ti kupi, Fato, belenzuke: 1. Pjesmo, živote moj 2. Ko ti kupi, Fato, belenzuke | 1969 |
| Zašto pjevam u kafani: 1. Zašto pjevam u kafani 2. Pišeš meni, draga majko 3. Zapjevaj meni, cigo, brate 4. Što te nisam prije sreo | 1969 |
| Majko, majko: 1. Majko, majko (with Hanka Puzić); 2. Iskrena ljubav 3. Daruj mi noć, daruj mi tren 4. Volim, majko, siroticu | 1969 |
| Nađi drugoga zauvijek: 1. Nađi drugoga zauvijek 2. Kraj sa tobom odnio je snove 3. Kad suze najave kraj 4. Najlijepše veče | 1970 |
| Moj brate u tuđini / Pusti me: 1. Moj brate u tuđini 2. Pusti me | 1970 |
| Jednom se živi / Gdje nači takvu ljubav: 1. Jednom se živi 2. Gdje nači takvu ljubav | 1970 |
| Bila si moja ljubav / Hoću ljubav: 1. Bila si moja ljubav 2. Hoću ljubav | 1971 |
| Opet duša boli: 1. Opet duša boli 2. Vrati se 3. Ne plači, majko 4. Zašto razdireš srce moje | 1971 |
| Ilidža '71: 1. Ja nisam kriv | 1971 |
| Jedna žena ostavi me: 1. Jedna žena ostavi me 2. Plačem, suza nemam 3. Sabina; 4. Davno, već davno | 1972 |
| Idi i ljubi drugog / Zašto, majko, pitaš sina: 1. Idi i ljubi drugog 2. Zašto, majko, pitaš sina | 1972 |
| Nemoj s drugom biti / Sretan sine put: 1. Nemoj s drugom biti 2. Sretan sine put | December 1972 |
| Pišite majci, sinovi moji / Zbog lažne ljubavi: 1. Pišite majci, sinovi moji 2. Zbog lažne ljubavi | 1973 |
| Što naumi, to učini / Ako te voli, uzmi je: 1. Što naumi, to učini 2. Ako te voli, uzmi je | 1973 |
| Voljena / Sudbino moja: 1. Voljena; 2. Sudbino moja | 1974 |
| Meho i Bahrija Puzić: 1. Pjevaj brate 2. Ko čaršijom konja jaše | 1974 |
| Žena prijatelja mog / Jedina je ona bila: 1. Žena prijatelja mog 2. Jedina je ona bila | August 1974 |
| Moliću je da se vrati / Gore tvoja pisma: 1. Moliću je da se vrati 2. Gore tvoja pisma | August 1975 |
| Misli svako da je meni lako / Ti si meni nekad bila sve: 1. Misli svako da je meni lako 2. Ti si meni nekad bila sve | February 1976 |
| Ja se u lov spremam: 1. Ja se u lov spremam 2. Nigdje zore, ni bijela dana 3. Put putuje Latif-aga; 4. Salko se vija previja | 1976 |
| Meni dobro, a drugima bolje / Ne vjerujem da te drugi ljubi: 1. Meni dobro, a drugima bolje 2. Ne vjerujem da te drugi ljubi | June 1976 |
| Na put se spremam: 1. Na put se spremam 2. Salko se previja 3. Volio sam curu plavu 4. Nigdje zore, ni bijela dana 5. Put putuje Latif-Aga; 6. Vihor ružu niz polje tjeraše 7. Trepetljika trepetala 8. Tužno vjetri gorom viju 9. Ja se u lov spremam 10. Škripi đeram 11. Kad ja pođoh na Bembašu; 12. Mehmeda majka budila | 1976 |
| Tebi majko misli lete#: 1. Tebi majko misli lete 2. Bol za majkom 3. Zašto, majko, pitaš sina 4. Budila majka Mehmeda; 5. O, majko majko 6. Moliću je da se vrati 7. Pišite majci sinovi moji 8. Ne plači, majko 9. Sretan, sine, put 10. Salko se vija, previja 11. Volim, majko, siroticu 12. Jedina je ona bila | 1977 |
| Vrati se starim putem / Volio sam jednu ženu: 1. Vrati se starim putem 2. Volio sam jednu ženu | 1977 |
| Plakala si sinoć / Nismo blizu jedno drugom: 1. Plakala si sinoć 2. Nismo blizu jedno drugom | July 1977 |
| Ah, da život duže traje / Rekoše mi da me tražiš: 1. Ah, da život duže traje 2. Rekoše mi da me tražiš | July 1978 |
| Šta ču kući tako rano / Lijepa Šahza: 1. Šta ču kući tako rano 2. Lijepa Šahza | 1979 |
| Ništa lijepše od ovih godina / Ostani noćas, pravi mi društvo: 1. Ništa lijepše od ovih godina 2. Ostani noćas, pravi mi društvo | 1979 |
| Partizanske ruže / Gdje naći takvu ljubav: 1. Partizanske ruže 2. Gdje naći takvu ljubav | 1980 |
| Sabina / Bila si moja ljubav: 1. Sabina; 2. Bila si moja ljubav | 1980 |
| Zašto srce tebe zove / O, kestenu stari: 1. Zašto srce tebe zove 2. O, kestenu stari | 1980 |
| Plakala je cijele noći / Zlatne kočije: 1. Plakala je cijele noći 2. Zlatne kočije | January 1981 |
| Tamo negdje u Bosni daleko / Ne slušaj srce: 1. Tamo negdje u Bosni daleko 2. Ne slušaj srce | 1982 |
| Mi Bosanci delije: 1. Mi Bosanci delije 2. Ostaću ja kraj tebe 3. Zašto plačeš 4. Tražim te, tražim 5. Noćas sam sretan, ljubavi moja 6. Povjerenje, samo povjerenje 7. Ja ne znam gdje je ona 8. Pjesma Odžaku; 9. Pisao sam majci | September 1982 |
| Il' me ženi, il' tamburu kupi: 1. Il' me ženi, il' tamburu kupi 2. Mila moja 3. Hanko, lijepa Bosanko; 4. On ili ja 5. Hoću da te ljubim 6. Ti ćeš samo moja biti 7. Na izvoru 8. Zaljubljujem se, zaljubljujem 9. Tebe sam zaželio 10. Volim je, volim | February 1984 |
| Ne dam ti da odeš / Mladost i iskustvo: 1. Ne dam ti da odeš 2. Mladost i iskustvo | 1986 |
| Vogošća '86: 1. Pamtim naše noći | 1986 |
| Mladost i iskustvo: 1. Nedam ti da odeš 2. Mladost i iskustvo 3. Odavno se javila nisi 4. Što te nema 5. Dao bih ti sve 6. Rastavit nas neće 7. Pamtim naše razgovore 8. Zbogom moje najlijepše godine 9. Noćas se pjesmom borim za tebe 10. Gdje naći takvu ljubav | 1986 |
| Nije ona svemu kriva / Žalim što te gubim: 1. Nije ona svemu kriva 2. Žalim što te gubim | 1988 |
| Nije ona svemu kriva: 1. Nije ona svemu kriva 2. Nek te bole moje rane 3. Zbog tebe 4. Tražim sokak kome ne znam ime 5. Edina; 6. Žalim što te gubim 7. Jedna suza u oku se skrila 8. Ne može te niko uzeti od mene 9. Moj živote, pusta bašto 10. Hoću srcem da ti kažem | 1988 |
| Ne žali je, majko: 1. Ne žali je, majko 2. Stara ljubav 3. Ljubavi je kraj 4. Budi žena k'o sve druge 5. Ibro, bekrija 6. Vrati se 7. Ne ljuti se 8. Volio sam plave oči 9. Zašto da te kunem | 1989 |
| Najdraže sevdalinke: 1. Snijeg Pade Na Behar, Na Voće; 2. Čudna Jada Od Mostara Grada; 3. Propio Se Dujčin Petar; 4. U Đul Bašti; 5. Sedamdeset i dva dana 6. Šta ču kući tako rano 7. Budila majka Mehmeda; 8. Pita Hanka Halil Mehandžiju; 9. Na put se spremam 10. Koja gora Ivo | 1989 |
| Vjetrovi rata: 1. Vjetrovi rata 2. Bosanska majko 3. Nema više borca Đilde; 4. Odžačka brigada 5. Pamti sine 6. Gradačac; 7. Junaci zmaja od Bosne | 1992 |
| Grijeh je mlado ne ljubiti: 1. Grijeh je mlado ne ljubiti 2. Tri godine čekam duge 3. Priđi bliže 4. Ko to Bosnu dira 5. Daj mi draga 6. Pogriješila si 7. Zašto da te kunem 8. Samo Bosnu ne dirajte | 1994 |
| Poruka Šehida: 1. Poruka Šehida; 2. Prošlost; 3. O bože, dragi bože 4. Baš mi prija 5. Bosna suza nema više 6. Čičak; 7. Ramazan dolazi 8. Volim te lijepoto | 1995 |
| Hitovi: 1. Nije Ona Svemu Kriva; 2. Ne Dam Ti Da Odes; 3. Pamtim Nase Razgovore; 4. Stara Ljubav; 5. Hanko, Lijepa Bosanko; 6. Trazim Sokak Kome Neznam Ime; 7. Vrati Se; 8. Il' Me Zeni Il' Tamburu Kupi; 9. Majko Majko; 10. Vomim Majko Siroticu; 11. Moj Brate U Tudjini; 12. Ne Placi Majko; 13. Opet Dusa Boli; 14. Kad Suze Najave Kraj; 15. Zena Prijatelja Mog; 16. Ostani Nocas Pravi Mi Drustvo; 17. Plakala Si Sinoc; 18. Nista Ljepse Od Ovih Godina; 19. Pisite Majci Sinovi Moji | 1999 |
| Nezaboravni hitovi: 1. Žena prijatelja mog 2. Volim majko siroticu 3. Il Me Ženi Il tamburu kupi 4. Ostani Noćas Pravi Mi društvo 5. Kad Suze Najave Kraj; 6. Moj Brate U Tuđini; 7. Plakala Si Sinoć; 8. Ne Plači, Majko; 9. Pišite Majci Sinovi; 10. Majko, majko | 2000 |
| Decenija sevdaha: 1. Na dar tebi 2. Bol za majkom 3. Hoću ljubav 4. Mehmeda majka budila 5. Drugovi; 6. O Ivane Ivane; 7. Platno bijeli 8. Kad niz sokak ideš 9. Ako nećeš ti 10. Tamo negdje u Bosni daleko 11. Zapjevaj meni cigo 12. Kad suze najave kraj 13. Moj brate u tuđini 14. Opet duša boli 15. Pišeš meni draga majko 16. Zašto pjevam u kafani 17. Najlijepše veče 18. Iskrena ljubav 19. U proljeće kad vjetrić zapiri | 2003 |
| Gledaj me draga: 1. Gledaj me draga, nagledaj me se 2. Šta ću kući tako rano 3. Evo ovu rumen ružu 4. Budila majka Mehmeda; 5. Snijeg pade na behar na voće 6. Salko se vija, previja 7. Vihor ružu niz polje tjeraše 8. Srdo moja ne srdi se na me 9. Zvijezda tjera mjeseca 10. Oj djevojko pod brdom 11. Čudna jada od Mostara grada 12. Tužno vjetri gorom viju 13. Lov lovio Muhareme; 14. Oj djevojko ašik dušo 15. Teško je ljubit tajno 16. Niz polje idu babo sejmeni | 2003 |
| Stare ljubavi: 1. Stara ljubav 2. Ibro, bekrija 3. Vrati se 4. Ostani noćas pravi mi društvo 5. Grijeh je mlado ne ljubiti 6. Ja ne znam gde je ona 7. Prošlost; 8. Gore tvoja pisma 9. Sretan sine put 10. Volim majko siroticu 11. Sanjo'sam te majko 12. Moj brate u tuđini 13. Pišite majci sinovi moji 14. Majko, majko | 2003 |
| Zaljubljeni kralj: 1. Pjevam pjesmu 2. Zaljubljeni kralj 3. Vrati se starim putem 4. Voljeni grade 5. Jasmina; 6. Majčin oproštaj 7. Ona misli da je volim 8. Da bog da se i ti udala 9. Daruj mi noć 10. Šta je ljubav nisam znao 11. Njene me ruke grle 12. Ne ne dolazi | 2005 |
| Moje pjesme, moji snovi: 1. Čudna jada od Mostara grada 2. Zvijezda tjera mjeseca 3. Evo ovu rumen ružu 4. Gore tvoja pisma 5. Grijeh je mlado ne ljubiti 6. Ja je volim 7. Ja ne znam gdje je ona 8. Kad ja pođoh na Bentbašu (Bembašu); 9. Koliko te volim 10. Ne tješi me, prijatelju 11. Prošlost; 12. Put putuje Latif-aga; 13. Snijeg pade na behar na voće 14. Tražim sokak kome ne znam ime 15. Vrati se 16. Žalim što te gubim 17. Trepetiljka trepetala | 2006 |
| Folk zvijezde zauvijek: Meho Puzić: 1. Snijeg Pade Na Behar, Na Voće; 2. U Đul Bašti; 3. Budila Majka Mehmeda; 4. Čudna Jada, Od Mostara Grada; 5. Kad Ja Pođoh Na Bembašu; 6. Propio Se Dujčin Petar; 7. Sedamdeset I Dva Dana; 8. Put putuje latif-aga 9. Trepetljika trepetala 10. Šta Ću Kući Tako Rano; 11. Pita Hanka Halil Mehandžiju; 12. Na Put Se Spremam; 13. Koja Gora, Ivo; 14. Ko Ti Kupi Fato, Belenzuke; 15. Volio Sam Curu Plavu; 16. Salko Se Vija, Previja; 17. Tebi majko misli lete 18. O Majko, Majko; 19. Moj Brate U Tuđini; 20. Žena Prijatelja Mog; 21. Volim majko, siroticu 22. Mi Bosanci Delije; 23. Pišite Majci, Sinovi Moji; 24. Kad Suze Najave Kraj; 25. Jednom se Živi; 26. Ja Se želim Ocem Zvati; 27. Lijepa Suada; 28. Pjesmo, Živote Moj; 29. Iz Malenog Mog Sokaka; 30. Ne Žali Je, Majko; 31. Zašto Pjevam U Kafani; 32. Il' Me Ženi, Il' Tamburu Kupi | 2012 |
| Srce te jedno voli: 1. Srce te jedno voli | unknown |
