= Po mojoj bašti zumbuli cvjetaju =

EP by Beba Selimović
- Released: 1958 (re-released 1962)
- Genre: Bosnian folk
- Label: Jugoton

Beba Selimović chronology
Po mojoj bašti zumbuli cvjetaju (1958)	Danju slušam pjesme tužne (1960)

Po mojoj bašti zumbuli cvjetaju (In My Garden Hyacinths Bloom) is the debut release and first gramophone record by Bosnian folk singer Beba Selimović. It was released in 1958 through the label Jugoton.

== Background ==
In January 1954, when Selimović was 14 years of age, she was one of six people chosen out of 300 candidates to sing for Radio Sarajevo, which kicked off her professional career as a soloist for the station.

== Track listing ==
No.	Title	Writer(s)	Length
1.	"Po mojoj bašti zumbuli cvjetaju" (In My Garden Hyacinths Bloom)	Jozo Penava
2.	"Bol boluje mlado momče" (The Boy Is Hurting)	Bosnian folk song

== Personnel ==
=== Instruments ===
- Jovica Petković – accordion
- Ratomir Petković – accordion
