= Tugo moja =

EP by Beba Selimović
- Released: 26 September 1964
- Genre: Bosnian folk
- Label: Jugoton

Beba Selimović chronology
Djevojka viče s visoka brda (1963)	Tugo moja (1964)	Sedamdeset i dva dana (1964)

Tugo moja (My Sorrow) is the seventh release and seventh gramophone record by Bosnian folk singer Beba Selimović. It was released 26 September 1964 through the label Jugoton.

== Track listing ==
No.	Title	Writer(s)	Length
1.	"Tugo moja" (My Sorrow)	Nikola Škrba; Ismet Alajbegović
2.	"U avliji" (In the Yard)	Nikola Škrba; Jovica Petković
3.	"Dani dugi" (Long Days)	Nikola Škrba; Jovica Petković
4.	"Jorgovane, cvijeće plavo" (Lilac, Blue Flower)	Gavrilo Jurišić; Jovica Petković

== Personnel ==
- Narodni Ansambl Jovice Petkovića – ensemble
