= Božo Vrećo =

Bosnian musician (born 1983)

Božo Vrećo Божо Врећо
- Born: 18 October 1983 (age 42); Foča, SR Bosnia and Herzegovina, SFR Yugoslavia
- Genres: sevdalinka
- Formerly of: Halka
- Website: vrecobozo.com

Božo Vrećo (Serbian Cyrillic: Божо Врећо; born 18 October 1983) is a Bosnian musician.

== Childhood ==
Božo Vrećo was born in Foča, SR Bosnia and Herzegovina, SFR Yugoslavia on 18 October 1983. Their father died when they were five years old, and they grew up with their mother and two sisters. Their mother was an artist and encouraged Vrećo to paint and draw, as well as to learn music. They taught themself how to read and write music, as well as sing, from the Internet. As an effeminate child, Vrećo experienced many struggles growing up in their provincial home town, and was frequently bullied.

== Professional career ==
Vrećo went to Belgrade, Serbia, to earn their master's degree in archaeology, but after graduation they realized that their true passion was sevdalinka, a traditional genre of Balkan music. At age 27, they began learning how to sing from traditional recordings. They then traveled to Sarajevo. A local musician discovered Vrećo singing in a café and invited them to perform in the band Halka, with whom they recorded their first CD.

Prior to their musical career, Vrećo worked as an archaeology professor. They began performing professionally with the band Halka in 2013, and gained fame within and away from the Balkans at sold-out concerts and international music festivals. Vrećo performed as the lead singer for Halka, recording two albums with them in 2013 and 2015, which resulted in a world tour. In 2014, in between recording two albums with Halka, Vrećo recorded their first solo album, Moj sevdah, where he performed seventeen sevdalinkas in a cappella style, including two original songs. By 2015, Vrećo became known and written about in the English-speaking world. In 2017, Vrećo recorded their second solo album, Pandora, which included performances with Marko Louis, Indigo, Velahavie, and Merima Ključo.

Two songs from the album Moj sevdah would be part of Koštana, a play directed by Kokan Mladenović. Vrećo had a leading role in the play. The Swedish national television station would produce a documentary about Vrećo, their life, and their devotion to sevdalinka.

In addition to sevdalinka, Vrećo enjoys jazz, blues and soul, and tries to bring their elements into their interpretation of sevdalinka. They are inspired by the musical artists Himzo Polovina, Selim Salihović, Emina Zečaj, and Nada Mamula.

Vrećo performs as both female and male, as they see themself as a person of both genders. At the beginning of their career, Vrećo wore men's suits, then decided to perform as what they consider their true self. It is their belief that a person who sings songs of courage should present nothing but honesty to their audience, which is one reason why more traditional audiences love him. They take offense at those who consider them a drag performer.

As a reviver of a traditional women's genre, Vrećo defends the place of women in Bosnian society by singing their songs. They wear their hair long, with kohl around their eyes, and dress in kaftans, dresses, or floating coats as they spin and sing on stage. At the same time, they wear a beard. Their performances are continually sold out in the patriarchal Balkan society, and their fans cross gender and ethnic boundaries. Vrećo hopes that, through their musical performances, they can also be a voice for LGBT rights in the Balkans.

== Personal life ==
In some interviews, Vrećo has identified as gay, but they consistently state that they are both female and male and that they are a free person who will not hide their true self.

== Discography ==
=== Albums with Halka ===
- Halka (2013)
- O ljubavi (2014)

=== Solo albums ===
- Moj sevdah (2014)
- Pandora (2017)
- Melek (2018)
- Lachrimae (with Edin Karamazov; 2020)
- Sevdahology (2025)
