= Put putuje Latif aga =

EP by Beba Selimović
- Released: 1962
- Genre: Bosnian folk
- Label: Diskos

Beba Selimović chronology
Kiša pada, trava raste (1962)	Put putuje Latif aga (1962)	Sarajevo na visokom gledu (1963)

Put putuje Latif aga (Agha Latif Is Traveling) is the fourth release and fourth gramophone record by Bosnian folk singer Beba Selimović. It was released in 1962 through the label Diskos.

== Track listing ==
No.	Title	Writer(s)	Length
1.	"Put putuje Latif aga" (Agha Latif Is Traveling)	traditional folk music
2.	"Kruševačka petorka - kolo"	Radojka Živković
3.	"Haj sa prozora" (Come Down from the Window)	Jozo Penava
4.	"Banjski Čačak - kolo"	traditional folk music

== Personnel ==
- Orkestar Radojke Živković – orchestra
