= Merima Njegomir =

Serbian singer (1953–2021)

Merima Njegomir Мерима Његомир
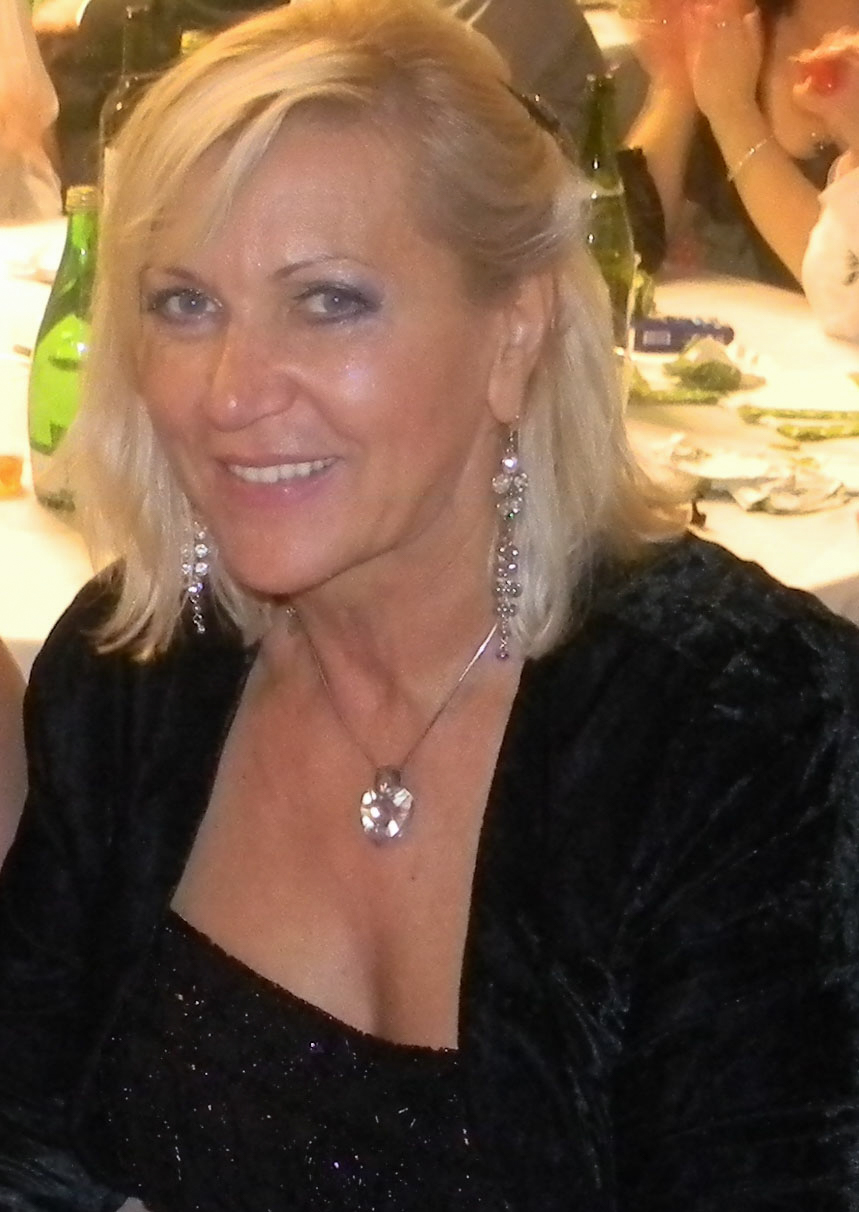
- Njegomir in Mississauga in 2011

Background information
- Born: Merima Kurtiš; 9 November 1953; Zemun, PR Serbia, FPR Yugoslavia
- Died: 20 November 2021 (aged 68) Belgrade, Serbia
- Occupation: Singer
- Years active: 1975–2021

Merima Kurtiš (Serbian Cyrillic: Мерима Куртиш; 9 November 1953 – 20 November 2021), known professionally as Merima Njegomir (Serbian Cyrillic: Мерима Његомир), was a Serbian folk and sevdah singer.

== Life ==
She began her career singing many interpretations of popular Bosnian folk songs, such as "Moj dilbere" and "Sejdefu majka buđaše", which gained her popularity across Serbia and former Yugoslavia. Her career, spanning over four decades, includes 24 albums, and songs in over 20 languages, such as Hungarian, Hebrew, Italian, Greek and Turkish. Her father Adem was a Macedonian Turk from Ohrid, while her mother Fatima was a Bosniak from Bijeljina.

Njegomir is best known for her distinct mezzo-soprano vocal range, and folk songs with influences from her native Zemun. She remains one of the most prominent names in Serbian music, with many songs achieving popularity in Eastern Europe, from Slovenia to Russia. One of her more notable songs is "Ivanova korita", which, as a 2005 release, was covered by numerous artists, including the Croatian music act Fijakeri. The single was published yet again in 2012, as a rendition, which included various elements of modern turbo-folk. Its third release was as a part of the album Pjesme iz Crne Gore (Songs from Montenegro).

Although Njegomir is most famous for providing vocals for Serbian folk songs, her music style includes jazz, classical, pop, and Romani music.

Njegomir died of pancreatic cancer on 20 November 2021.
