= Dušan Šestić =

- Born: Dušan Šestić; 1946 (age 79–80); Banja Luka, PR Bosnia and Herzegovina, FPR Yugoslavia
- Instrument: Violin

Dušan Šestić (Serbian Cyrillic: Душан Шестић; born 1946) is a Bosnian Serb musician and composer; he composed the national anthem of Bosnia and Herzegovina.

== Early life and education ==
Šestić, a Bosnian Serb, was born in Banja Luka in 1946. He studied the violin at the Music Academy in Belgrade, Serbia.

== Career ==
Šestić began his professional career at the JNA Symphony Orchestra in Belgrade, Serbia. He was a musician at the Military Orchestra in Split, Croatia, where he lived from 1984 to 1991. During that time, he also performed for the Split Opera. He also composes children's music, popular music, radio music, and TV music. He also worked in theater.

In the 1990s, in need of money, Šestić composed for the state the national anthem of Bosnia and Herzegovina, which was adopted provisionally in 1998 and formally in 1999. After its adoption, some Bosnian Serbs denounced him for composing a national anthem for a country whose existence they were opposed to, whereas some Bosniaks and Bosnian Croats disliked that a Bosnian Serb, such as Šestić, composed it instead of one of their ethnic kinsmen. It is wordless, despite efforts spanning nearly two decades to get lyrics adopted for it. Šestić has expressed his disappointment at its lack of lyrics, having written proposed ones for it which were never adopted. In 2008, he and Benjamin Isović had written lyrics for the composition but they were not adopted. Though he was promised monetary compensation for those lyrics, he had not received payment as of 2015. In the late 2000s, commentators noted an aesthetic similarity of the Bosnian national anthem to Elmer Bernstein's instrumental piece "Faber College Theme" that serves as the introductory music to the 1978 film National Lampoon's Animal House, leading to accusations of plagiarism and calls for the composition to be replaced as a result. Šestić defended himself against accusations of plagiarism, saying that he could not have plagiarized Bernstein's work as he was unaware of the latter's composition.

In 2008, when the Republika Srpska was looking for entries for a new regional anthem, Šestić along with Benjamin Isovic submitted an entry, "Мајко земљо" (lit. 'Mother Earth') as a contender, though ultimately it was not chosen.

Šestić taught violin at the strings department of the Vlado Milosevic Music School in Banja Luka.

== Personal life ==
Šestić's daughter, Marija Šestić, is also a musician and represented Bosnia and Herzegovina in the Eurovision Song Contest 2007 in Helsinki, Finland.
