= Aj, kolika je Jahorina planina =

Traditional folk song from Bosnia and Herzegovina

"Aj, kolika je Jahorina planina" (Oh, how big is Jahora's mountain) is a traditional sevdalinka song from Bosnia and Herzegovina.

It was covered by many singers and bands, including Nada Mamula, Hanka Paldum and Teška industrija.

== Lyrics ==
Serbo-Croatian

Aj, kolika je Jahorina planina, (x2)
Aj, siv je soko preletjeti ne može, (x2)
Aj, a kamoli dobar junak na konju! (x2)

Aj, djevojka je pregazila bez konja! (x2)
Aj, svi Bosanci dobre konje sedlaju, (x2)
Aj, a Bosanke ruse kose češljaju! (x2)

English translation

Oh, how big is Jahora's mountain, (x2)
Oh, the gray falcon cannot fly over it, (x2)
Oh, let alone a good hero on a horse! (x2)

Oh, the girl ran over it without a horse! (x2)
Oh, all Bosnians saddle good horses, (x2)
Oh, and Bosnian women comb their red hair! (x2)

"Kolika je Jahorina planina"

Single by Nada Mamula
- Released: 1952
- Genre: Folk
- Label: Jugoton

== Nada Mamula version ==
Her version is performed with harmonica. It was released on 78 rpm shellac.

== Teška industrija version ==
Their version of this folk song is one of greatest hits from 1970s. The video was filmed on Jahorina.

"Kolika je Jahorina planina"

Single by Teška Industrija
- A-side: "Aj kolika je Jahorina planina"
- B-side: "Kovači sreće"
- Released: July 11, 1975
- Recorded: 1975
- Genre: Hard rock, rock
- Label: Jugoton

== In popular culture ==
TV Sarajevo sketch show Top lista nadrealista named fictional pastry shop after this song.

Yesterday in the early morning, the market inspection in the Ja'orina planina pastry shop owned by Sevcet Halimi and his two sons found the documents of two workers of Swedish nationality…

— Top lista nadrealista, Swedish workers in Sarajevo
