= Maja Milinković =

Bosnian fado singer and songwriter (born 1981)

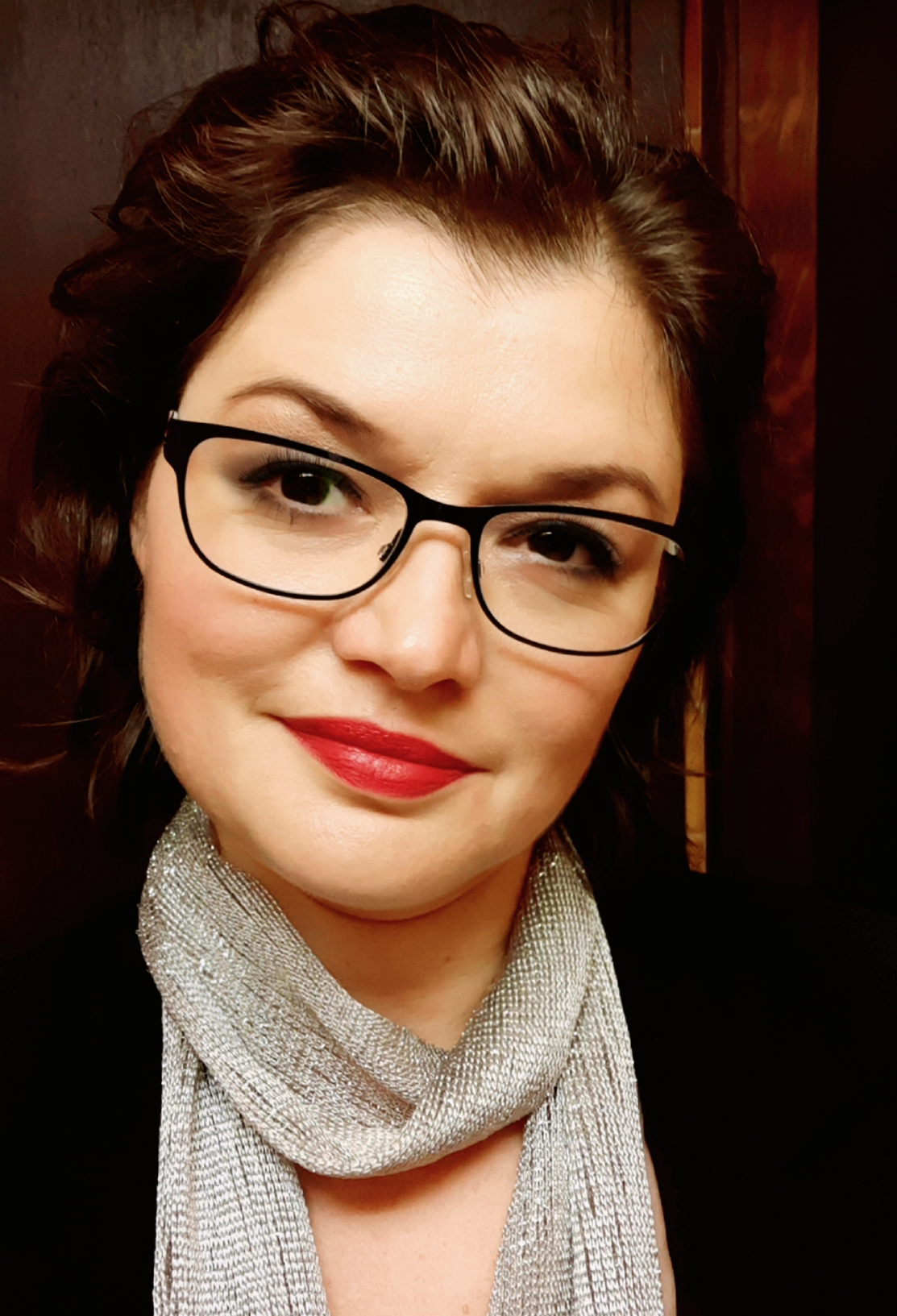
Portrait of Maja Milinković

Maja Milinković (Serbo-Croatian Cyrillic: Маја Милинковић; born 21 April 1981) is a Bosnian fado singer and songwriter, born in Sarajevo, the capital of SR Bosnia and Herzegovina (formerly a part of SFR Yugoslavia).

Milinković became known to a wide public in Bosnia and Herzegovina and other parts of Southeast Europe in 2003, as one of the 6 finalists of the first OBN Music Talent Show, the popular television show in Bosnia and Herzegovina.

She began singing at an early age in a church choir during the Bosnian War, and learned to play guitar in a shelter. She started to sing in a rock band when she was 15. Her grandfather and grandmother encouraged her to sing. She graduated from the department of Music Theory and pedagogy at Music Academy of Sarajevo. She plays piano and guitar and works as a singer, songwriter, composer and music arranger. In 2009 she discovered the fado genre, and since then she has dedicated her life and work to it. Since 2013 she lives in Lisbon, Portugal.

== Music career ==
Milinković became widely known in Bosnia and Herzegovina and other parts of the Balkan Peninsula in 2003, as she was one of the six finalists of the first OBN Music Talent Show. After the show Maja recorded her first solo pop-rock album "Zacarani krug" in the Hayat production label. The album won 11 awards, including a Davorin for the best female interpretation. The song "Zovem Te" won three awards (interpretation, audience and arrangement) on the "Bihacki festival". The song "Genijalno" won first place for interpretation of the "Expert’s Jury”,"I BHRTV festival".

In 2011 she released her second solo pop-rock album "Očekivanja".

She discovered fado in 2009, through the voice of Portuguese fado leading singer Amália Rodrigues, and she started to do research on that genre. She also started to learn Portuguese. In 2012 she recorded the first fado album in Bosnia and Herzegovina, the well known fado "Tudo isto é fado" which Amalia Rodrigues recorded at 1955, and since then has focussed on fado. During 2012, she had a dozen fado concerts in Bosnia and Herzegovina. Among them a concert at the music festival Baščaršija Nights in Sarajevo. At the end of 2012, she performed a concert at the Sarajevo Chamber Theater. She was noted for her charismatic, powerful and strong emotional interpretation.

Milinković moved to Portugal in 2013 where she currently lives. In 2015 she released the single "Znam za rijeku", the first fado in a Balkan Slavic language. The next year, in 2016, she released the single "Sou a chuva".

In 2017, she released the fado album "Fado é sorte" at the Museu do Fado, in Lisbon. In 2019, she released the fado - sevdah album "Fadolinka", and "Fadolinka 2.0" in 2023.

=== Concerts ===
Milinković had a solo concert in Lisbon in the Jerónimos Monastery in March 2017. The same year she also had the solo concert "Fado je sevdah" at the Bosnian Cultural Center in Sarajevo and a solo concert at the music festival “Baščaršijske noći" (Baščaršija Nights). In addition she has performed at Teatro Ibérico, Auditório Camões and Chamber Theater 55. Milinković has also performed at festivals such as Zenica Summer festival, Konjic Summer festival and National Multicultural Festival in Canberra 2020.

== Discography ==
=== Albums ===
- 2006 - Začarani krug CD
- 2011 - Očekivanja CD
- 2012 - Expectations CD
- 2013 - Fado Meu Maja live CD
- 2017 - Fado é sorte CD
- 2019 - Fadolinka CD
- 2021 - Kaftan d' Alma
- 2023 - Fadolinka 2.0

=== Singles ===
- 2007 - "Mito bekrijo"
- 2008 - "Kraj"
- 2009 - "Ako te ne budem imala"
- 2012 - "Tudo isto é fado"
- 2013 - "Trago fados nos sentidos"
- 2015 - "Znam za rijeku"
- 2016 - "Sou a chuva"
- 2018 - "Romansa- Uspavanka za dušu"
- 2018 - "Não há fado sem saudade"
- 2022 - "Sarajevo u duši mi spavaš"
- 2022 - "Não há fado sem saudade (remix)"
