= Ibrica Jusić =

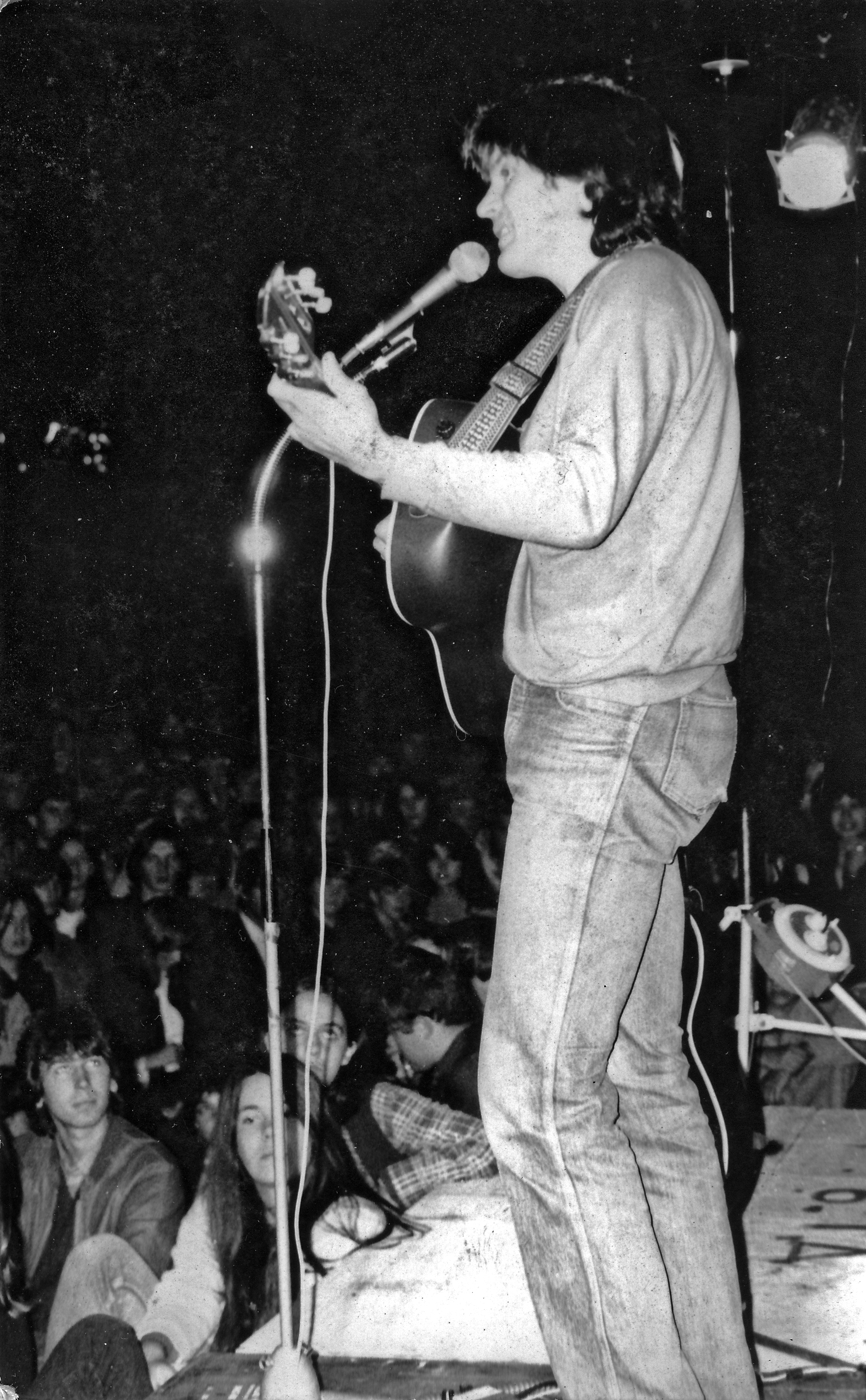
- Croatian rock musician Ibrica Jusić, 1981

Background information
- Born: Ibrahim Jusić; 15 December 1944 (age 81); Dubrovnik, FS Croatia, DF Yugoslavia
- Genres: Chanson, folk, rock, pop, sevdalinka
- Instruments: Guitar, vocals
- Years active: 1965–present
- Labels: Jugoton, PGP-RTB
- Website: www.ibricajusic.com

Ibrahim "Ibrica" Jusić (born 15 December 1944) is a Croatian chanson, folk, pop and sevdalinka singer-songwriter and musician.

== Early life and career beginnings ==
Ibrica Jusić was born as Ibrahim Jusić in the Croatian city of Dubrovnik into a family with seven children. His parents family originates from Mostar, Bosnia and Herzegovina and he grew up listening to sevdalinka and Italian canzone music. Jusić identifies as a Muslim Croat.

Under the direction of his older brother Đelo Jusić (born as Đevalhudin Jusić), who was the leader of the group Dubrovački trubaduri (Dubrovnik Troubadours), Ibrica learned to play the guitar. He performed acoustical music and chansons all over Dubrovnik, before officially starting his professional career in 1965 in Zagreb, after being invited by composer Pero Gotovac.

== Career ==
His song "Celuloidni pajac" (Celluloid Clown) was the winner of first place in the 1968 Zagreb Festival. He won the first prize at the same festival the following two years as well: in 1969 with the song "Osobenjak" (Eccentric) and in 1970 with the song "Mačka" (Cat.)

Jusić had a few more successful singles following the festival wins before moving to Paris, saying that he found Zagreb to be "too small." He lived in Paris for three years and performed in cabarets, returning to Dubrovnik only during the summers, during which he held outdoors evening concerts on the steps of the Dominican Monastery. By using his summer travels to Dubrovnik he started to cooperate with Dubrovačke ljetne igre (Dubrovnik Summer Festival) in 1971. With the songs of composer Pero Gotovac, he sang on several of the Festival shows, one of them being Miroslav Krleža's Aretej. He composed music and sang in the show Životopis Miha Pracata (Biography of Miho Pracat) in 1977. In the same year he recited in the Knežev dvor.

In 1974, Jusić became one of the first Yugoslav singers to record songs on an LP record on a record label Jugoton. He was one of the first persons who did solo-concert in Lisinski Theater in 1975. In next years he sang in almost all worldwide popular places, such as the Sydney Opera House, Carnegie Hall in New York City, the China Theatre in Stockholm. He composed music for works of writers and poets Luko Paljetak, Dobriša Cesarić, Aleksa Šantić, Mika Antić, William Shakespeare, Bertolt Brecht, Desanka Maksimović and Drago Britvić, among others.

Throughout the remaining years of the 1970s, he released several more singles, LP's and albums including Emina (1977), which featured his cover of the Bosnian sevdalinka Emina, written by poet Aleksa Šantić in 1902.

He released a self-titled symphony album, Ibrica, on 26 February 1981. Ibrica's older brother, maestro Đelo Jusić, worked with him on the songs. The album was done in rich Mediterranean arrangements. It contained songs such as "Šalom Sara" (Shalom Sara), "U svakom slučaju te volim" (In Every Case, I Love You), "Na Stradunu" (On the Stradun) and others.

Jusić returned to France in 1980 upon receiving an invitation by the famous French show Le Grand Échiquier. He got one more invitation from the same show on Christmas Eve, but this time, the guests also were stars like Charles Aznavour and the Gold Gate Quartet. Over the following two years, he was featured in the shows of the same producer.

As a result of his experiences in Paris, he recorded a French-language album La vie (The Life) in 1985.

He spent the second half of the 1980s living in Sweden, which inspired his 1988 album Hodaju ljudi (People Walk). He said it was a result of impact of his many years of residence in Sweden.

Jusić returned to Croatia in 1991, just as the Croatian War was beginning and Yugoslavia was breaking up. At the end of 1993, he wrote music for "Velika magija" (Great Magic) in the Gavella Drama Theatre, where he played and sang. His return to domestic waters resulted in retrospective compilation issued in Croatia Records in 1994. In 1997, he entered to the newly founded Dancing Bear record label and published a compact disc, Dan prije (The Day Before.) The material was recorded live at a concert held on 24 May 1997 in ZeKaeM. The CD's name comes from the fact that the day before his concert, in the same place, the ceiling collapsed.

In 2001 he recorded Hazarder (A Tribute to Leonard Cohen) (Hustler), a tribute album, with twelve translations of poems of legendary Canadian chansonnier.

Amanet (2003), contained all classic sevdalinka songs, which Ibrica Jusić dedicated to the spiritual homeland and the country of his parents, Bosnia and Herzegovina, by recording the new, modern arrangements of a number of beautiful Bosnian sevdalinkas. In 2004, he became the first Croatian singer who was officially invited to Switzerland's Montreux Jazz Festival, one of the largest jazz festivals. That same year, he performed on Etno World Festival, Oslo.

In 2008, he released Amanet 2, a follow-up to his 2003 sevdalinka album. It contained 13 original Bosnian sevdalinka songs recorded in the studio Liburnia Jazz Mozart, with the sounds of the accordion virtuoso Omar Pobrica and violin maestro Sasha Olenjuk.

Jusić marked his jubilee 45 years since the start of his career in 2009. Since his music has a mixture of Italian, French, Croatian and Bosnian influences, 2009 marked a number of concerts titled Od Šekspira do sevdaha (From Shakespeare to Sevdah.)

== Discography ==
Extended plays

- Celuloidni Pajac (1968)

Singles

- To su djeca / Človek ki ga ni (1969) with Majda Sepe
- Još uvijek ne znam neke važne stvari / Mala kavana (1969)
- Mačka (1970)
- Nemoj ići (1970)
- Zašto san sritan / Leila (1971)
- Kutija koja pokazuje kakvo će biti vrijeme / Svi smo mi jedno... (1974)
- Bezimenoj / Pjesma o ruži (1974)
- Emina / Na trgu ispod sata (1978)
- Šalom Sara / U svakom slučaju te volim (1980)
- Još samo ovaj put (2004)

Studio albums

- Skaline od sudbine (1975)
- Nostromo (1976)
- Emina (1977)
- Ne dajte da vas zavedu (1978)
- Čovjek bez kafića (1980)
- Ibrica (1981)
- Ibrica Jusić + Pas soba 501 osoba dvije (1983)
- La vie (1985)
- Hodaju ljudi (1988)
- Retrospektiva (1994)
- Dan prije (1998)
- Hazarder (A Tribute to Leonard Cohen) (1999)
- Amanet (2003)
- Kavana Mediteran (2006)
- Amanet 2 (2008)

Compilation alums

- Ibrica Jusić (1973)
