= Himzo Polovina =

Himzo Polovina Химзо Половина

Background information
- Born: 11 March 1927; Mostar, Kingdom of Serbs, Croats and Slovenes (now Bosnia and Herzegovina)
- Died: 5 August 1986 (aged 59) Plav, SR Montenegro, SFR Yugoslavia
- Genre: Bosnian folk · sevdalinka
- Occupations: Musician; singer; psychiatrist
- Instruments: vocals
- Years active: 1953–1986
- Spouse: Fikreta Polovina

Himzo Polovina (Serbo-Croatian Cyrillic: Химзо Половина; 11 March 1927 – 5 August 1986) was a Bosnian singer and songwriter, and a sevdalinka. Polovina was a neuropsychiatrist by profession. His deep understanding and knowledge of sevdalinka left a great mark on Bosnian culture.

== Biography ==
Polovina was born on 11 March 1927 in Mostar, Bosnia and Herzegovina. His father, Mušan Polovina, was an Austro-Hungarian soldier during World War I. The Polovina family comes from the outskirts of Foča. During his fathers service in Ljubljana, he met and married Ivanka Hlebec, making Himzo Polovina the child of an ethnically mixed marriage between a Bosniak father and a Slovene mother.

Himzo was introduced to music and singing as a child. His father played the šargija and would often sing sevdalinka songs. As their father sang, Himzo and his siblings sang along in unison.Himzo's father encouraged him and his siblings to go to the Bosniak Muslim society "Itihad", Polovina, his brother Mirza and sister Samija played a part in the Ottoman-era Bosniak drama Hasanaginica.

In the late 1930s, right before World War II broke out, Polovina was taught to play the violin by renowned Czech professor and violinist Karel Malaček.

Polovina was an active member of the Bosniak movement Young Muslims (Bosnian: Mladi muslimani) after World War II, he was taken to trial many times but was never sentenced. At one of the trials he was accused of wearing traditional Muslim clothing and propagating Muslim ideas.

From 1947 until he left for Sarajevo, he was a member of the folk ensemble "Abrašević", with whom he toured cities and villages across Yugoslavia. Polovina was married to a woman named Fikreta Medošević. They had a daughter Rubina and a son Edmir.

He died at the age of 59 from a heart attack while on vacation with his family in Montenegro, and was buried in the Bare Cemetery in Sarajevo.

== Career ==
In January 1953 he auditioned live for Radio Sarajevo. He performed the sevdalinka song "Mehmeda je stara majka karala" and was accepted. His cover of the Bosnian sevdalinka, Emina, is considered by many to be the best version of the song. His 1960s version featured added verses, which were written after the subject of the song, Emina Sefić, died in 1967. Upon hearing Emina's death, Polovina told poet Sevda Katica, who spoke the new verses.

== Discography ==
The following is the complete list of albums, singles and extended plays (EPs) released by Himzo Polovina:

Tracks	Released
Stade se cvijeće bosom kititi: 1. Stade se cvijeće rosom kititi 2. U lijepom starom gradu Višegradu	1958
Gonđe ružo u zelenom sadu: 1. Gonđe ružo u zelenom sadu 2. Mustafu majka budila	1958
Pokraj kuće male: 1. Pokraj kuće male 2. Magla pala od pola Saraj'va	1958
Gonđe ružo u zelenom sadu / Mustafu majka budila: 1. Gonđe ružo u zelenom sadu 2. Mustafu majka budila	1960
Kad se Jangin iz Sokaka pomoli with Dušanka Labor: 1. Kad se Jangin iz Sokaka pomoli 2. S one strane pive 3. Otvor' vrata od hamama 4. Zaplakala stara majka Džafer Begova	1963
Telal viče: 1. Telal viče 2. Prošetala Suljagina Fata	1963
Moj behare / Pjesma o Mehmed-Paši Sokoloviću: 1. Moj behare 2. Pjesma o Mehmed-Paši Sokoloviću	October 1964
Emina / Hasanagin Sevdah (Što te nema): 1. Emina; 2. Hasanagin Sevdah (Što te nema)	1964
Azra: 1. Azra; 2. Meni draga sitna pisma piše 3. Na prijestolju sjedi Sultan; 4. Lutaj, pjesmo	October 1965
Stade se cvijeće rosom kititi: 1. Stade se cvijeće rosom kititi 2. U lijepom starom gradu Višegradu; 3. Telal viče 4. Pošetala Suljagina Fata	May 1966
Ehlimana: 1. Ehlimana; 2. Akšam Geldi; 3. Imam curu malenu 4. Komšinica	1967
Mila majko, šalji me na vodu / U sotonu jedne proljetne noći: 1. Mila majko, šalji me na vodu 2. U sotonu jedne proljetne noći	1969
Jutros prođoh kroz čaršiju / Dvore gradi komadina Mujo: 1. Jutros prođoh kroz čaršiju 2. Dvore gradi komadina Mujo	1969
Jesi li čula dušo? / Otputovah u daljine: 1. Jesi li čula dušo?; 2. Otputovah u daljine	1970
U Stambolu na Bosforu / Okladi se momče i djevojče: 1. U Stambolu na Bosforu; 2. Okladi se momče i djevojče	1971
Narodne pjesme iz Bosne i Hercegovine: 1. Sarajevo, divno mjesto 2. Zaplakala stara majka 3. Oj djevojko, džidžo moja 4. Širi mjesec po Igmanu zrake 5. Imal' jada 6. Čije je ono djevojče 7. Čudna jada od Mostara grada 8. Mila majko šalji me na vodu 9. Dunjaluče, golem ti si 10. Voljelo se dvoje mladih 11. Gonđe ružo 12. Široka kita rakita	21 November 1972
U sutonu jedne proljetne noći: 1. U sutonu jedne proljetne noći 2. Crne oči dobro glede 3. Na put se spremam 4. Tiha je noć	1975
Kradem ti se u večeri: 1. Kad ja pođoh na Bembašu; 2. Vino piju age Sarajlije; 3. Kradem ti se u večeri 4. Sjećaš li se kad si lani 5. Razbolje se lijepa Hajrija; 6. Pokraj vrela 7. U Stambolu na Bosforu; 8. Oj djevojko Anadolko; 9. Djevojka je zelen bor sadila 10. Ikindija; 11. Ja zagrizoh šareniku jabuku 12. Kad se Jangin iz Sokaka pomoli	1976
Emina / U Stambolu na Bosforu: 1. Emina; 2. U Stambolu na Bosforu	1977
Kliknu vila sa vrha porima: 1. U Trebinju gradu 2. Izvi se Mujo na grade 3. Kliknu vila sa vrha Porima; 4. Jasenice, nestalo ti gaza 5. Dobro došli, kićeni svatovi 6. Omere, prvo gledanje 7. Poletjela dva goluba 8. Ali-Paša na Hercegovini; 9. Mujagu majka budila 10. Nema ljepše cure od malene Đule	1979
Mehmed Paša tri cara služio / U lijepom, starom, gradu Višegradu: 1. Mehmed Paša tri cara služio 2. U lijepom, starom, gradu Višegradu	1980
Mila majko, šalji me na vodu / Djevojka je zelen bor sadila: 1. Mila majko, šalji me na vodu 2. Djevojka je zelen bor sadila	1982
Sevdah i suze: 1. Tamburalo momče uz tamburu 2. Poljem se vija hajdar delija 3. U lijepom starom gradu Višegradu; 4. Kad ja pođoh na Bembašu; 5. Otvor' vrata od hamana 6. Karanfile, cvijeće moje 7. Oj, djevojko, pod brdom 8. Snijeg pade na behar, na voće 9. Oj, bogati, siva ptico sokole 10. Stade se cvijeće rosom kititi	September 1984
Magla pala od pola Saraj'va: 1. Magla pala od pola Saraj'va; 2. Ehlimana; 3. Pod Skočićem trava pogažena 4. Meni draga sitna pisma piše 5. Imam curu malenu 6. Otputovah u daljine 7. Okladi se momče i djevojče 8. Pjesma o Mehmed-Paši Sokoloviću; 9. Pusti me, majko 10. Laku noć 11. Pokraj kuće male 12. Komšinica; 13. Jesi li čula dušo	1987
Himzo Polovina: 1. Emina; 2. Stade se cvijeće rosom kititi 3. Pošetala Suljagina Fata; 4. Jutros prođoh kroz Čaršiju; 5. Moj behare 6. Lutaj, pjesmo 7. Hasanagin Sevdah; 8. Na prijestolju sjedi Sultan; 9. Azra; 10. Telal viče 11. Akšam geldi 12. Dvore gradi komadina Mujo	1988
Voljelo se dvoje mladih / Pod skočićem trava pogažena: 1. Voljelo se dvoje mladih 2. Pod skočićem trava pogažena	unknown release date
Nema lijepše cure / Pusti me, majko: 1. Nema lijepše cure 2. Pusti me, majko	unknown release date
