= National anthem of Bosnia and Herzegovina =

Državna himna Bosne i Hercegovine
- National anthem of Bosnia and Herzegovina
- Also known as: "Intermeco" (English: 'Intermezzo')
- Music: Dušan Šestić, 1998
- Adopted: 25 June 1999 (de facto); 2001 (de jure)
- Preceded by: "Jedna si jedina"

Audio sample
- U.S. Navy Band instrumental rendition in A-flat major (one stanza): file; help

The National Anthem of Bosnia and Herzegovina was composed in 1998 by Dušan Šestić and was adopted provisionally in 1999, before being made official in 2001. It has no official lyrics, though unofficial lyrics have been written for it.

Following the Dayton Agreement that ended the Bosnian War in the mid-1990s, Bosnian state symbols were mandated to be inclusive of the country's main ethnic groups and not make any overt references to a specific one. The Bosnian national anthem that was in use at the time was considered to be insufficiently inclusive towards all of the country's ethnic groups and thus the United Nations, which oversaw the country as part of the Dayton Agreement, decided to replace it with an instrumental one, which was considered by it to be more inclusive. In the two decades since its inception, various attempts have been made to adopt lyrics for it, most recently in 2018, but due to political disagreements, none have been successful as yet.

The Bosnian national anthem is one of very few national anthems to be protected under copyright. The copyright to the anthem is owned by the state of Bosnia and Herzegovina.

== History ==
=== Background ===
The national anthem was adopted provisionally by the UN's High Representative for Bosnia and Herzegovina on 25 June 1999 by the promulgation of the Law on the National Anthem of Bosnia and Herzegovina, replacing the previous national anthem, "Jedna si jedina", which was not particularly well-liked by the country's Serb and Croat communities. The Bosnian government itself formally adopted it in 2001, and it has reportedly been in use along with the flag and coat of arms since 10 February 1998.

Bosnian Serb composer Dušan Šestić from Banja Luka composed the melody, to which initially there were no lyrics under the working title "Intermeco" ("Intermezzo"), which is commonly referred to as its title although it was never officially adopted as such. Šestić was denounced by some Serbs who disliked that he had written the national anthem of a state whose existence they were opposed to, whereas some Croats and Bosniaks disliked that a Serb had composed the national anthem as opposed to a member of their ethnicity.

Due to its length, an abridged version omitting several bars near the middle of the piece is often played at occasions requiring brevity.

== Lyrics ==
2009 Bosnian VOA News video about that year's lyrical proposal process, featuring a live rendition of the proposed 2008 lyrics by a musicologist and a statement by the composer and one of the lyrics' authors

Since 2007, various attempts have been made to have lyrics adopted for the Bosnian national anthem. Lyrics written by Šestić, the original composer, and Benjamin Isović were proposed in June 2008 and accepted by a parliamentary commission in February 2009. The 2008 lyrics emphasize national unity and a focus on the future, rather than emphasizing the past or ethnic differences. Though he was reportedly supposed to be paid 17,000 Euros by the state split with Isović for his role in writing new lyrics, Šestić had not yet received compensation as of 2015. The decision still requires approval of the Council of Ministers of Bosnia and Herzegovina and the Parliamentary Assembly of Bosnia and Herzegovina. The proposed lyrics do not mention the two administrative entities or the constitutional nations that make up the state, leading to some opposition, and end with the line "We are going into the future, together!". As part of the consideration process, a recording of the lyrics was sung for a government committee by Dragica Panić Kašanski, a musicologist.

A lyrical adoption was again proposed in 2016, but those were not approved either. In February 2018, a renewed effort for an adoption of lyrics was initiated, though due to the ethnically-fragmented nature of Bosnian politics, it is unlikely to succeed in light of several other similar attempts being made and never approved. Some have suggested using the words from the Serbo-Croatian poem "Emina" as the lyrics for the national anthem, due to its connection to Bosniaks, Croats, and Serbs alike.

== Reception ==
According to a 2011 survey conducted of the Bosnian population, Bosnians' attitudes towards their country's national anthem were shown to be sharply split along ethnic lines, with Bosniaks generally liking the national anthem, Croats being ambivalent towards it, and Serbs overwhelmingly disliking it, even booing it at some performances, refusing to stand for it, and displaying three-fingered salutes. In some cases, the Bosnian and Herzegovinian national anthem is not played in Republika Srpska even at events where others are played.

=== Controversy ===
In the late 2000s, commentators noted an aesthetic similarity of the Bosnian and Herzegovinian national anthem to Elmer Bernstein's instrumental piece "Faber College Theme" that serves as the introductory music to the 1978 film National Lampoon's Animal House, leading to accusations of plagiarism and calls for the composition to be replaced as a result. The composer Dušan Šestić defended himself against accusations of plagiarism, saying that he could not have plagiarized Bernstein's work as he was unaware of the latter's composition.
