= Umihana Čuvidina =

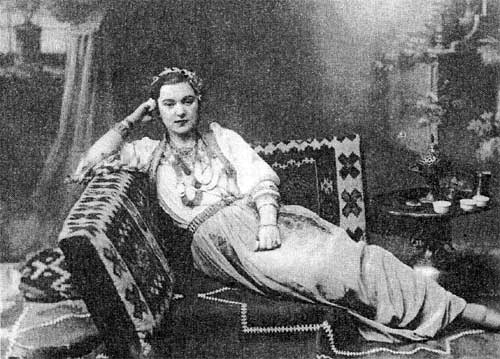
- A later staged photograph, probably from the late 19th or early 20th century, depicting Umihana Čuvidina, Bosnian poetess of Sevdah, and Bosniak costume and setting.
- Born: c. 1794; Sarajevo, Bosnia Eyalet, Ottoman Empire
- Died: c. 1870 (aged 76); Sarajevo, Bosnia Vilayet, Ottoman Empire
- Resting place: Sarajevo, Bosnia and Herzegovina

Umihana Čuvidina (c. 1794 – c. 1870) was a Bosnian poet of Ottoman times. She is the earliest Bosnian female author whose work survived to this day. Čuvidina sang her poems and contributed greatly to the traditional genre of Bosniak folk music, sevdalinka.

== Biography ==
Čuvidina was born in Sarajevo around the year 1794, while modern-day Bosnia and Herzegovina was part of the Ottoman Empire. She was from a Bosniak family of restaurateurs, who later grew and sold watermelons. Čuvidina grew up in Hrid, a neighborhood of Sarajevo situated on the left bank of the river Miljacka.

In 1813, Čuvidina was engaged to a young man named Mujo Čamdži-bajraktar who died as a soldier of the imperial army of Ali-paša Derendelija during the First Serbian Uprising of the early 19th century. He was killed near the small town of Loznica near the Drina river. Strongly affected by her fiancé's death, Čuvidina decided never to marry and began writing poetry about her fiancé and his fellow soldiers.

For three years after Mujo's death, Umihana did not make it out of her yard. In the fourth year, she manually cut off all her hair as a sign of eternal mourning for her dead love and tied it onto the fence in her yard. This is something that is mentioned in her poems.

The only full poem that can be attributed to Čuvidina without doubt is the 79-verse-long epos called "Sarajlije iđu na vojsku protiv Srbije" (English: "The Men of Sarajevo March to War Against Serbia"), which was written in Arebica script.

== Death ==
Umihana Čuvidina lived into old age and died in about 1870. She was buried in a Muslim funeral in an unknown location in Sarajevo, "below the grove on the cliff".

== Legacy ==
=== Elementary school ===
An elementary school named after her (Umihana Čuvidina Osnovna Škola) opened in 1970 in a part of Sarajevo called Boljakov Potok.

On 26 September 1992, a few of the students were killed by Serb forces during the Bosnian War. Three months later, on 16 December 1992, three more young students from the school were killed by a Serb grenade and multiple others wounded as they played in the courtyard of the building. These incidents were a part of the Siege of Sarajevo which lasted nearly four years.

=== Other ===
The home in which she was born on the street "Ulica Mujezinova" in Stari Grad, Sarajevo has severely deteriorated over the years. It is difficult for the older residents of the street to walk around during winter, when ice and snow cover the old cobblestones, which are continuing to deteriorate, as grass grows around them. The residents had multiple times asked the city to pay to have a plaque with historical data about Čuvidina placed on the home where she once lived, but to no avail until 2011 when the city of Sarajevo approved 80,000 Bosnian convertible marks to restore the street and home.

In September 2012, Bosnian actress Nada Đurevska announced that she and her colleague Admir Glamočak were planning to create a monodrama about Umihana Čuvidina. Đurevska stated that she had been collecting information about the life of the enigmatic poet for years.

== Partial list of works ==
=== circa 1810s-1820s ===
- "Čamdži Mujo i lijepa Uma" (Čamdži Mujo and Beautiful Uma)
- "Sarajlije iđu na vojsku protiv Srbije" (The Men of Sarajevo March to War Against Serbia)
- "Žal za Čamdži Mujom" (Longing for Čamdži Mujo)
