= OKC Abrašević =

OKC Abrasevic Logo

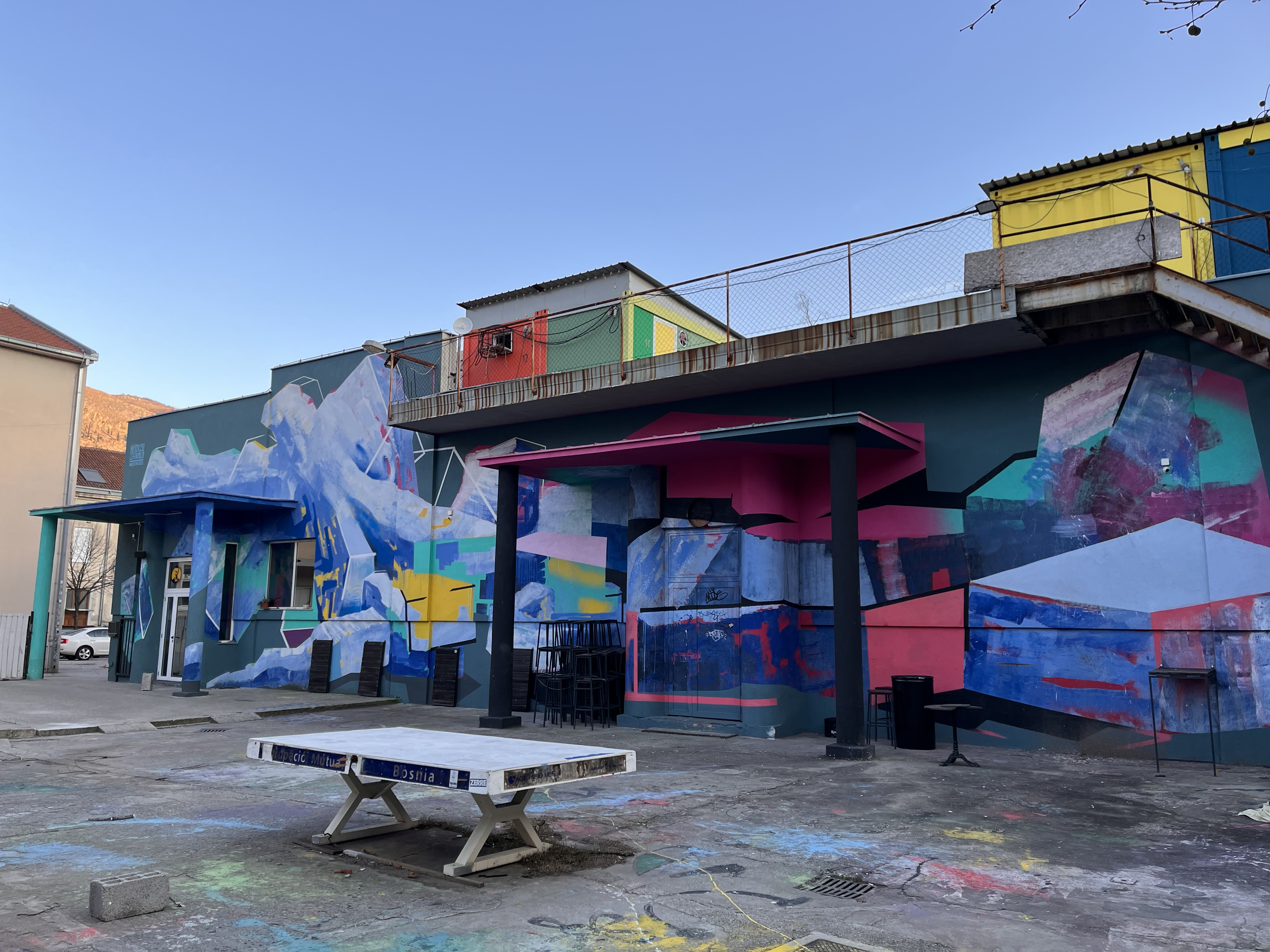
OKC Abrašević building (2023)

OKC Abrašević (English: The Youth Cultural Centre Abrašević) is an open network of non-governmental organizations, informal groups and individuals based in Mostar, Bosnia and Herzegovina. It offers a space and support to youth in realizing ideas and it encourages projects that promotes civic society, arts and social cohesion. After being closed for nearly ten years, it came back to life in 2003 thanks to a network of non-government, youth associations which were initially created around the MIF (Mostar Intercultural Festival).

The organization organizes concerts, theatre performances, art exhibitions, workshops, movie screenings, and poetry readings. The main OKC Abrašević space includes a concert hall and a bar.

Abrašević also houses three subdivisions called AbrašMEDIA, ABArt and AbrašMEDIA Radio. AbrašMEDIA covers news stories and articles, ABArt encourages social transformation through arts and AbrašRadio produces radio program.

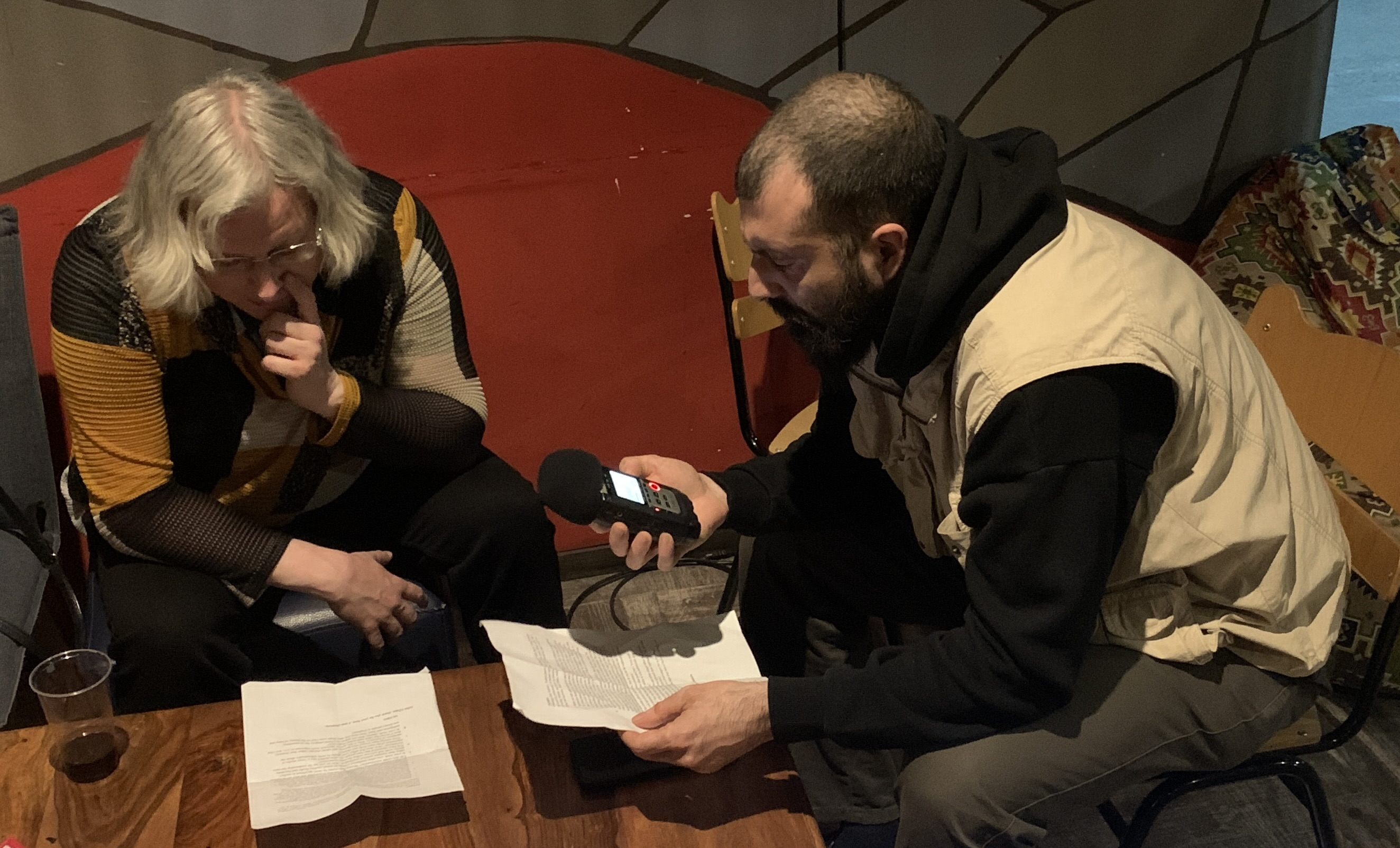
Juliet Jacques giving interview to Nikola Rončević of Abraš Radio in 2026
