= Safet Isović =

Bosnian singer (1936–2007)

Safet Isović Савет Исовић
- Isović in 1965
- Born: 8 January 1936; Bileća, Kingdom of Yugoslavia
- Died: 2 September 2007 (aged 71); Sarajevo, Bosnia and Herzegovina
- Resting place: Ali Pasha's Mosque, Sarajevo
- Other name: Kralj sevdaha (King of Sevdah)
- Education: University of Sarajevo (LLB)
- Occupations: Musician; singer
- Years active: 1956–2007
- Children: Benjamin Isović
- Musical career
- Genres: sevdalinka; Bosnian folk
- Instrument: vocals
- Labels: Jugoton; PGP RTB; Diskoton; Beograd Disk; Sani Produktion; Terra; Extra Music

Safet Isović (Serbo-Croatian Cyrillic: Сафет Исовић; 8 January 1936 – 2 September 2007) was a Bosnian singer who performed the Bosnian traditional music sevdalinka.

== Early life and family ==
Isović was born into a Bosniak family in Bileća, located in the Herzegovina region of modern-day Bosnia and Herzegovina, while it was a part of Kingdom of Yugoslavia. Safet was one of three children of Ahmet Isović and Ermina; his brother's name was Fehim and his sister was Fehma. Safet's father Ahmet was the son of Zaim Isović, whose first wife, Derviša (née Baraković), died during childbirth on 19 June 1900.

Safet became a war refugee at the age of five in 1941 when Yugoslavia was invaded by Nazi Germany. His family escaped to Banja Luka, where he attended elementary school. After the war, the Isović family returned to Bileća. In his youth, Safet's family moved around Yugoslavia and lived in several cities, including Bileća, Banja Luka, Trebinje and Slavonski Brod.

== Career ==
Upon graduating from high school, Isović wanted to enroll in college in Zagreb, but under pressure from his parents he moved to Sarajevo in 1955 and began attending law school.

While studying in Sarajevo, he was persuaded by college friends to audition for the student ensemble "Slobodan Princip Seljo," where he impressed the panel. Shortly after joining the group, friends persuaded him to audition for Radio Sarajevo. He failed his first audition but passed the second and spent the following year with music teachers, singing and learning to play the piano. After a year of study, he was invited to record two songs, which were released on 6 April 1957.

Isović held his first solo concert on 19 March 1963 in Belgrade and was the only singer from the former Yugoslavia ever to perform at the Sydney Opera House in Australia.

During his 50+ year-long career, he covered many sevdalinka and Bosnian folk songs, including Moj dilbere.

Isović won many awards and performed at some of the largest festivals throughout the former Yugoslavia. This contributed significantly to the rebirth of the sevdalinka. He won the Golden Microphone award in Yugoslavia and 35 regional silver and gold record awards.

In a radio interview, fellow Bosnian sevdalinka singer Silvana Armenulić said that she was a fan of his music and called Isović her "darling."

== Personal life and politics ==
Although a self-described anti-Communist, Isović spent time with communist politicians Avdo Humo and Džemal Bijedić, and Yugoslav president Josip Broz Tito and his wife Jovanka Broz.

Isović was a staunch supporter of Bosniak nationalism and was one of the signatories of the founding charter of the SDA. Later, he would serve as their delegate in the Assembly of Bosnia and Herzegovina.

In the summer of 1992, Isović was injured by bombing during the Bosnian War when a grenade hit his apartment, which followed the dissolution of Yugoslavia. During the Yugoslav wars of the 1990s, Isović became a war refugee for the second time in his life, living in Zagreb, Croatia until the end of the Bosnian War. He spent the final decade of his life in Sarajevo.

== Death ==
Isović died on 2 September 2007 in Sarajevo and was buried the next day at Ali Pasha's Mosque. His death provoked a massive outpouring of grief around the country. At a memorial service held at the National Theatre of Bosnia and Herzegovina, he was called the "Father of the Sevdalinka" by Beba Selimović. The Minister of Culture and Sport, Emir Hadžihafizbegović said that Safet Isović did great deeds both when he spoke and when he sang. Ivica Šarić, of the Sarajevo Opera, said that the world was left now without the best interpreter of sevdalinka.

== See also ==
- List of Bosnia and Herzegovina patriotic songs
