= Nada Mamula =

Serbian singer

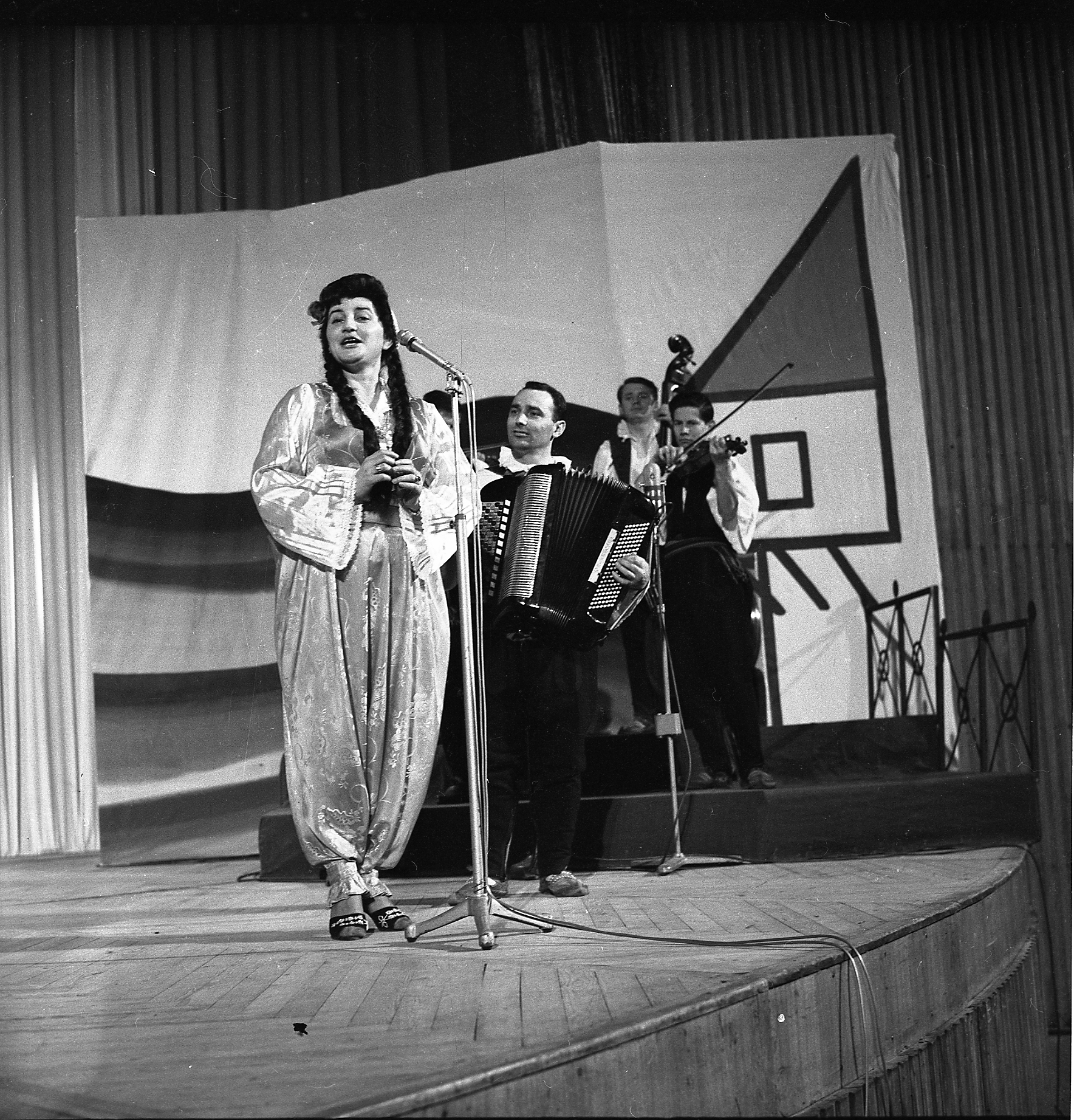
- Mamula in 1962 at the Sijelo na vrelu Bosne TV show taping.

Background information
- Born: Nada Vukićević; 9 January 1927; Belgrade, Kingdom of Yugoslavia
- Died: 11 October 2001 (aged 74) Belgrade, FR Yugoslavia
- Genres: Folk, Sevdalinka
- Occupation: Singer
- Instrument: Vocals
- Years active: 1946–2001

Nada Mamula (née Vukićević; 9 January 1927 – 11 October 2001) was a Serbian and Bosnian singer.

She started her career on Radio Beograd, where she passed an audition in 1946 (as Nada Vukićević). In 1946 she delivered her first ever professional performances as Nada Vukićević along with Danica Obrenić and accordionist Voja Trifunović. Soon after marrying Nikola Mamula, she moved to Sarajevo and started to work on Radio Sarajevo. Her first famous Sevdalinka was "Ah meraka u večeri rane". She was one of the most popular singers of Yugoslavia in the second half of the twentieth century. Her discography includes two LPs records released by Jugoton, four LPs released in the United States, Canada, the Netherlands, and Bulgaria and a few dozen singles.

She died and was buried in Belgrade in 2001. She left over 150 recordings of Bosnian Sevdalinka interpretations as well as traditional Serbian songs in the archives of Radio Beograd, Radio Novi Sad and Radio Sarajevo.

Her best-known interpretations are: "U đul bašti", "Mujo kuje konja po mjesecu", "Bosno moja", "Omer beže", "Negdje u daljine", "Bere cura plav jorgovan", "Na teferič pošla nana", "Ah meraka u večeri rane" as well as the ever-famous unofficial anthem of Sarajevo "Kad ja pođoh na Bembasu".
