= List of Bosnia and Herzegovina folk songs =

This is a list of folk songs and traditional sevdalinka songs which originated in Bosnia and Herzegovina but are also popular in Croatia, Macedonia, Montenegro and Serbia.

== A ==
=== A što ćemo ljubav kriti ===
A što ćemo ljubav kriti	O, Why Would We Hide Our Love
A što ćemo ljubav kriti kad ja moram tvoja biti Srce više nije moje tebi dragi pripalo je Šta me tebi tako vuče osjećaji mene muče Il’ me uzmi il’ me ubi nedaj drugom da me ljubi	O, why would we hide our love When I have to be yours My heart is no longer my own It belonged to you, my dear What draws me to you like that The feelings torment me Either take me or kill me Do not allow to another [one/man] to kiss me

=== Aj, kolika je Jahorina planina ===
Aj, kolika je Jahorina planina	Oh, how big is Jahora's mountain
Aj, kolika je Jahorina planina, (x2) Aj, siv je soko preletjeti ne može, (x2) Aj, a kamoli dobar junak na konju! (x2) Aj, djevojka je pregazila bez konja! (x2) Aj, svi Bosanci dobre konje sedlaju, (x2) Aj, a Bosanke ruse kose češljaju! (x2)	Oh, how big is Jahora's mountain, (x2) Oh, the gray falcon cannot fly over it, (x2) Oh, let alone a good hero on a horse! (x2) Oh, the girl ran over it without a horse! (x2) Oh, all Bosnians saddle good horses, (x2) Oh, and Bosnian women comb their red hair! (x2)

== E ==
=== Emina ===
Emina was originally a poem written by Bosnian Serb poet Aleksa Šantić, being first published in 1902. It became a popular sevdalinka covered by many artists from the former Yugoslav republics over the course of the 20th century. The subject of the song is Šantić's teenage neighbor, a Bosniak girl named Emina Sefić. It is one of the most well-known sevdalinka songs of all time.

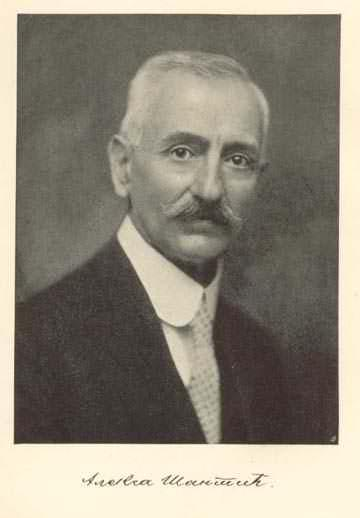
Aleksa Šantić, author of Emina

Emina	Emina
Sinoć kad se vraćah iz topla hamama, prođoh pokraj bašče staroga imama. Kad tamo u bašči, u hladu jasmina s ibrikom u ruci stajaše Emina. Ja kakva je pusta! Tako mi imana, stid je ne bi bilo da je kod sultana. Pa još kada šeće i plećima kreće, ni hodžin mi zapis više pomoć’ neće! Ja joj nazvah selam. Al’ moga mi dina, ne šće ni da čuje lijepa Emina, već u srebrn ibrik zahvatila vode, pa niz bašču đule zaljevati ode. S grana vjetar puhnu, pa niz pleći puste rasplete joj njene pletenice guste. Zamirisa kosa, k’o zumbuli plavi, a meni se krenu bururet u glavi! Malo ne posrnuh, mojega mi dina, al’ meni ne dođe lijepa Emina. Samo me je jednom pogledala mrko, niti haje, alčak, što za njome crko’!	Last night, returning from the warm hamam I passed by the garden of the old Imam And there in the garden, in the shade of a jasmine, With a pitcher in her hand stood Emina. What beauty she is! By iman I could swear, She would not be ashamed if she were near a sultan. And when she walks and moves her shoulders, Not even a Hodja's amulet could help me! I offered her salaam, but I could swear by my faith, Beautiful Emina does not even want to hear it, Instead she scooped water in a silver pitcher, And then downway the garden she went to water the roses. A wind blew from the branches, and then down her lovely shoulders Unraveling those thick braids of her. Her hair gave off a scent of blue hyacinths, Making me giddy and confused! I nearly stumbled, I swear by my faith, But beautiful Emina did not come to me. She only gave me one frowning look, Not even caring, she naughty person, that I am starving for her!

Many artists have covered the song, but the version by fellow Mostar native, Bosnian singer Himzo Polovina, remains the most popular. Upon hearing of the death of Emina Sefić, Polovina went to poet Sevda Katica's home in the Mostar neighborhood of Donja Mahala. He found her in the yard of the family home, informed her of Emina's death and she shuddered with grief and spoke the verses:

New verses	Translation
Umro stari pjesnik, umrla Emina ostala je pusta bašća od jasmina salomljen je ibrik uvelo je cvijeće pjesma o Emini, nikad umrijet neće.	The old poet has died, Emina has died The empty garden of jasmine was left behind The pitcher is broken The flowers have withered The song about Emina, will never die.

Polovina recorded the song and added Sevda's new verses.

== I ==
=== Istom zora na iztoku rudi ===
A very old Bosnian historical poem about Muhamed (Mujo) Isabegović, son of Isa-beg Ishaković.

Istom zora na iztoku rudi	Just now dawn is making the East red
Istom zora na iztoku rudi, siv se soko pod čadorom budi. Pod čadorom nikog ne bijaše, samo Mujo rane bolovaše. Sa jastuka glavu podizaše, mrkim okom sablju pogledaše: ”Sabljo moja roditelja moga, roditelja bega Isajbega. Dosta si mi jada zadavala, dosta jada oko Biograda. Dosta si mi jada zadavala, dosta muke oko Banja Luke.”	Just now dawn is making the East red, The grey hawk beneath the tent is waking up. Nobody's been under the tent, Nobody but Mujo, suffering wounds painfully. He was lifting his head off the pillow, Having glanced at a saber with dark look in his eye: "Oh, my saber of parent of mine, Oh, of parent of bey Isay-bey. You gave me so, so much of grief, So much of grief around of Biograd. You gave me so, so much of grief, A lot of anguish around Banja Luka."

== J ==
=== Ja kakva je sjajna mjesečina ===
Very old Bosnian traditional folk ballad.

Ja kakva je sjajna mjesečina	Oh, how bright moonlight is
Ja kakva je sjajna mjesečina, Još je ljepša Isajbegovica! Ona rodi devet divojaka I desetu pod pojasom nosi. Kada pojde beže Isaj-beže, On govori svojoj vjernoj ljubi: ”Oj, Boga ti, moja vjerna ljubo, Ako rodiš i desetu šćerku, Viš’ kuće ti jablan-drvo raste, Niže kuće Drina voda teče, Il’ se vješaj, il’ u Drinu skoči!” Ona rodi i desetu šćerku, I povija u bijelu svilu, Pa je baca u studenu Drinu: ”Hajde, šćeri, majka će za tobom!” Pa se vraća u bijelu kulu, Pa doziva devet djevojaka: ”Kad vam babo iz čaršije dojde, Pa vas pita gdje je vaša majka – ’Eno majke u studenoj Drini!’” Kada vidje beže Isa-beže, Kada vidje šta je učinio, Od žalosti srce mu je puklo.	Oh, how bright moonlight is, But Isabeg's Lady is even more beautiful! She gave birth to nine girls And the tenth she carries beneath her belt. When duke was going away, duke Isay-bey, He tells to his faithful love: "Oh, for God's sake, my faithful love, If you give birth even to a tenth daughter, Near the house the poplar tree grows, Lower of the house the Drina river flows, Either hang yourself or jump into Drina!" She's given birth to the tenth daughter, And wraps in white silk, Then throwing her into cold Drina: "Let's go, my daughter, your mother will follow you!" Then she goes back to the white tower, Then she is calling for nine girls: "When your father is back home from downtown, And then asks you where your mother is – 'There's mother in cold Drina!'" Once duke Isa-bey saw, Once he saw what he had done, His heart broke of bereavement.

== K ==
=== Kad ja pođoh (na Bembašu) ===
- Kad ja pođoh (na Bembašu)

=== Karanfil se na put sprema ===
A Bosnian traditional folk song. Although the song is much older, the first known recording was in 1935 in Gacko to the voice of a Bosniak peasant singer in her 60s named Halima Hrvo (née Đemo) from the village of Tjentište near Foča.

Karanfil se na put sprema	Karanfil Prepares for a Journey
Karanfil se na put sprema i pjeva aman, aman na put sprema i pjeva a draga mu konja sedla i plače Karanfile, cvijeće moje iz bašče, aman, aman, cvijeće moje iz bašče Ti odlaziš mene mladu ostavljaš aman, aman, mene mladu ostavljaš ostavljam te tvojoj majci i svojoj aman, aman, tvojoj majci i svojoj Šta će meni moja majka i tvoja aman, aman, moja majka i tvoja kad ja nemam svog dilbera kraj sebe	Karanfil prepares for a journey And sings aman, aman, Prepares for a journey and sings While his dear saddles his horse and weeps Oh, karanfil, my flower from garden Aman, aman, my flower from garden You are departing leaving me so young Aman, aman, leaving me so young I am leaving you to your mother and mine Aman, aman, your mother and mine What do I care for my mother and yours Aman, aman, my mother and yours If I don't have my Beloved [one/man] next to me

Halima Hrvo version; Bosnian	Halima Hrvo version; English
Karanfil se na put sprema, ej sprema E sprema, moj dilbere, moj Karanfilka konja vada i plače ”Karanfile, ime moje, i tvoje, S kim ti mene ludu mladu ostavljaš?” ”Ostavljam te s tvojom majkom i mojom.” ”Kad mi nema tebe bega kraj mene Kad ja pođem u ložnicu da spavam Men’ se čini ta ložnica tamnica.” Karanfil se na put sprema, ej sprema Karanfilka konja vada i plače ”Karanfile, ime moje i pleme! S kim ti mene ludu mladu ostavljaš?” ”Ostavljam te s mojom majkom i tvojom.” ”Što će meni tvoja majka i moja Da m’ ostavljaš jadnu mladu žalosnu?” ”Kad mi nejma tebe bega kraj mene Kad ja pođem u ložnicu da spavam Men’ se čini ta ložnica tamnica.”	Karanfil prepares for a journey, hey prepares, Hey, prepares, my beloved [one/man], mine Karanfilka brings his horse and weeps: "Karanfil, my name and yours, With whom are you leaving me crazy young?" "I'm leaving you with your mother and mine." "If I don't have you, bey, next to me When I leave into the bedchamber to sleep That bedchamber seems a prison to me." Karanfil prepares for a journey, hey prepares, Karanfilka brings his horse and weeps: "Karanfil, my name and family! With whom are you leaving me, crazy young?" "I'm leaving you with my mother and with yours." "What do I care for your mother and mine If you leave me miserable young sad?" "If I don’t have you, bey, next to me When I leave into the bedchamber to sleep That bedchamber seems a prison to me."

=== Kraj potoka bistre vode ===
Kraj potoka bistre vode	By a Stream of Crystal Clear Water
Kraj potoka Bistre vode Šuma zelena Nevesela, zabrinuta Sjedi djevojka. Potok teče i protiče, Tiho žubori A djevojka, uplakana, Kroz plač govori: Vrati mi se, mlad junače, Dragi, mlađani, Da na tvojim grud’ma umrem Grud’ma vatrenim.	By a stream Of crystal clear water Forest green Unhappy, worried A girl is sitting. The stream is flowing and flowing away, Quietly gurgling And the girl, crying, Through her tears says: Come back to me, young hero, My dear, young, So I can die on your chest Fiery chest.

=== Kraj tanana šadrvana ===
Kraj tanana šadrvana was translated into Bosnian in 1923 by Aleksa Šantić from a poem called Der Asra (The Azra) by the German poet Heinrich Heine.

Kraj tanana šadrvana	Near a Poor Fountain
Kraj tanahna šadrvana, Gdje žubori voda živa, Šetala se svakog dana, Sultanova kćerka mila. Svakog dana jedno ropče, Stajalo kraj šadrvana, Kako vr’jeme prolazilo, Sve je blijeđe, blijeđe bilo. Jednog dana zapita ga, Sultanova kćerka draga: ”Kazuj, robe, odakle si, iz plemena kojega si?” ”Ja se zovem El-Muhammed, iz plemena starih Azra, što za ljubav život gube, i umiru kada ljube!”	Near a poor fountain, Where vivid water gurgles, The dear Sultan's daughter, Walked by every day. Every day a lad, Was standing near the fountain, As time went on, The lad became paler and paler. One day the Sultan's daughter asked him: "Tell us, boy, where do you come from, To which tribe do you belong?" "My name is Al Muhammad, From the tribe of old Azras, Who lose their heads for love, And die when they love!"

== M ==
=== Moj dilbere ===
Moj dilbere has been in Bosnia since Ottoman times. The exact authors are unknown and Moj dilbere is considered to be a traditional song.

Moj dilbere	My Darling
Moj dilbere, kud’ se šećeš? Aj, što i mene ne povedeš? Povedi me u čaršiju, Aj, pa me prodaj bazardžiji Uzmi za me oku zlata Aj, pa pozlati dvoru vrata	My beloved [one/man], where do you betake yourself? Oh, why don't you lead even me there? Lead me to downtown Oh, then sell me to the bazaar merchant Take for me an oka of gold Oh, then gild the door for the palace

== O ==
- Oj Užice, mali Carigrade

=== Omer-beže na kuli sjeđaše ===
Omer-beže na kuli sjeđaše	Bey Omer Sits on the Tower
Omer-beže na kuli sjeđaše. Čuj, Omere, dilbere, haj, željo moja, aman, na kuli sjeđaše! Vjernu ljubu na krilu držaše. Čuj, Omere, dilbere, haj, srećo moja, aman, na krilu držaše! ”Vjerna ljubo, ženiću se drugom!” Čuj, Omere, dilbere, haj, željo moja, aman, ženiću se drugom! Žen’ se ago, i meni je drago. Čuj, Omere, dilbere, haj, željo moja, aman, i ja se udajem.	Bey Omer sits on the tower. Hear, Omer, my beloved [one/man], Hey, my desire, Aman, on the tower he sits! His faithful love he kept on his lap. Hear, Omer, my beloved, Hey, my happiness, Aman, on his lap he kept! "My faithful love, I will marry another [woman]!" Hear, Omer, my beloved, Hey, my desire, Aman, I will marry another! Get married my agha, I'm glad too. Hear, Omer, my beloved, Hey, my desire, Aman, I too am getting married.

== R ==
- Razbolje se lijepa Hajrija (Beautiful Hajrija Became Ill)
- Razbolje se Sultan Sulejman (Sultan Suleiman Became Ill)

== S ==
=== Sejdefu majka buđaše ===
Sejdefu majka buđaše is a folk song that is believed to have originated in Sarajevo centuries ago, while the region of Bosnia was a part of the Ottoman Empire. The exact author is unknown.

Over the centuries, the song spread amongst the Bosniak populations in Podgorica and the Sandžak regions of Montenegro and Serbia, respectively.

Sejdefu majka buđaše	Seydefa's Mother Wakes Her
Sejdefu majka buđaše ustani kćeri moja, Sejdefo Zar misliš majko da ja s’pim ja ti se mlada s dušom dijelim zovi mi majko komšije i prvo moje gledanje što smo se majko gledali u šajku lađu na more	Seydefa's mother wakes her Rise, my daughter Seydefa Do you think mother That I'm asleep At young age I'm parting with my soul Call to me the neighbors mother And my first love The one whose eyes met mine On a boat out at sea

== T ==
- Tekla rijeka potokom i jazom (River Flowed Through the Stream and Divide)
- Teško meni jadnoj u Saraj’vu samoj (It's Difficult for Me, a Poor [Woman] Alone in Saraj'vo)

== Z ==
- Zapjevala sojka ptica (Blue Jay Bird Sang)
- Zaplakala šećer Đula (The Sweet Rose Wept)
- Zaplakala stara majka (The Elderly Mother Wept)
- Zmaj od Bosne (Dragon of Bosnia)
- Zvijezda tjera mjeseca (The Star Chases the Moon)

== See also ==
- List of Bosnia and Herzegovina patriotic songs
- Music of Bosnia and Herzegovina
- Sevdalinka
