= Sevdalinka =

Traditional genre of folk music in Bosnia and Herzegovina

Sevdalinka (pronounced [seʋdǎliːŋka]), also known as sevdah, Bosanski sevdah is a traditional genre of folk music originating in Bosnia and Herzegovina. Sevdalinka is an integral part of the Bosniak culture, but it is spread among the other peoples of Bosnia and Herzegovina and across the ex-Yugoslav region as well, including Croatia, Montenegro, North Macedonia and Serbia. The actual composers of many sevdalinka songs are unknown because these are traditional folk songs.

In 2024, Sevdalinka was included on the UNESCO Representative List of the Intangible Cultural Heritage of Humanity.

Sevdalinka songs are characterised by their slow or moderate tempo, elaborate structure, and intense, emotionally potent melodies. The singer will often impose a rhythm and tempo into the song, both of which can vary throughout the piece. Traditionally, sevdalinkas are considered "women's songs", often addressing issues of longing and love, often unfulfilled and unrequited, some exploring women's physical desires for their loved ones, and some even having a range of comedic elements. However, there are sevdah songs written and sung by men as well. Traditionally, they were performed without any instruments, hence their elaborate melodies. As with most old folk styles, what the sounds of the original melodies would have been like rests on conjecture, as their interpretations are now closely aligned, in part due to the historically increasing role of accompanying instruments, with the Western chromatic system (which stands in contrast to Oriental modes, which often use intervals smaller than a semitone). Modern interpretations of sevdalinka songs are usually accompanied by a small orchestra featuring the accordion (as the most prominent instrument), the violin, the nylon-string guitar and/or other string instruments, such as the upright bass, the saz or šargija and occasionally the flute or clarinet, and the snare drum. In modern interpretations, an accordion or violin solo can almost always be heard between the verses. Celesta and double bass are used as well.

== Etymology ==
The word "sevdalinka" comes from the Turkish "sevda" which, in turn, derives from the Ottoman Turkish "sevda" and refers to the state of being in love, and more specifically to the intense and forlorn longing associated with love-sickness and unfulfilled and unrequited love. It was these associations that arrived with the word when it was brought to Bosnia through the activities of the Ottoman Empire. Today, it is a richly evocative Bosnian word, denoting "to pine" or "to long", whether for a loved one, a place or a time, with a sense of joy and pain, both being at the emotional core of sevdalinka lyrics.

Scholarly treatments of the term trace the semantic history of sevdah (and, by extension, sevdalinka) through Ottoman Turkish to the Arabic word sawdāʾ (black bile), whose meanings expanded from humoral medicine toward melancholy and then, in Ottoman usage, toward love-longing and desire.

Munib Maglajlić defines sevdalinka within Bosniak oral lyric poetry as a love song and glosses sevdah as ljubav, ljubavna čežnja, ljubavni zanos ("love, amorous longing, amorous rapture"). He also places the genre's formation in urban milieus shaped under Ottoman rule, emphasizing a synthesis of eastern elements and an inherited Slavic tradition.

The people of Bosnia employ the words "sevdalinka" and "sevdah" interchangeably as a name for this sort of music, although the shared Bosnian, Croatian, Montenegrin and Serbian loanword "sevdah" can also be used in other contexts. Saudade, a central term in Portuguese Fado, is of the same origin, emerging from Arabic medical discourses and used for centuries in both Al-Andalus and the Ottoman empire.

== Origins and history ==
One of the earliest songs retrospectively identified as a sevdalinka is "Bolest Muje Carevića" ("The Illness of Mujo Carević"), which is believed to date to around 1475. Another early written document referring to sevdalinka is the account of an Italian traveler passing through the Bosnian city of Visoko in 1574, who described "sad songs sung by the locals" that made him feel melancholic.

In the early 16th century, a duke from Split mentioned a song concerning the forbidden love between a Christian girl and a Muslim boy, which is regarded as an early example of sevdalinka.

In the early modern and 19th-century record, the terminology associated with this repertoire was not yet standardized. In 1814, Vuk Stefanović Karadžić referred to such material as "Bosnian songs", while the term sevdalinka became established only toward the end of the 19th century. An 1888 text by Ivan Zovko (in Ljubazni Bosanac) represents one of the earliest documented uses of the term sevdalinka in a title referring to folk-song material.

More intensive scholarly interest developed in the first half of the 20th century, including Hamid Dizdar's 1944 article on sevdalinka, and expanded after the Second World War through literary and musicological research. In socialist Yugoslavia, radio played a central role in the genre's wider circulation. Sevdalinka became a key republic-level popular genre in Bosnia and Herzegovina; Zaim Imamović performed on Radio Sarajevo on its first broadcast day (10 April 1945), and radio production gradually moved from sparsely accompanied performance toward richer orchestration with a radio orchestra.

In 2024, UNESCO inscribed Sevdalinka, traditional urban folk song on the Representative List of the Intangible Cultural Heritage of Humanity.

The earliest known female sevdalinka poet was Umihana Čuvidina, who wrote mainly about her deceased husband.

== Performers ==
A couple of significant singers of the sevdalinka in the 1920s, 1930s and 1940s were Rešad Bešlagić and Vuka Šeherović. Towards the end of World War II, Radio Sarajevo was founded and signed some of the most prominent "sevdalije" (or sevdalinka performers), among them Zaim Imamović in 1945, Himzo Polovina in 1953, Beba Selimović in 1954, Safet Isović in 1955, and Zehra Deović in 1960. Nada Mamula was signed to Radio Beograd in 1946. Others, such as Silvana Armenulić, Emina Zečaj, Nedžad Salković, Hanka Paldum and Meho Puzić, were signed to record for such production companies as Jugoton, Diskoton or other Yugoslav labels.

Although sung predominantly by traditional Bosniak singers, the sevdalinka made its way to many "mainstream" musicians. Sevdalinkas have as such been covered by Josipa Lisac, Željko Bebek, Ibrica Jusić, Jadranka Stojaković, Toše Proeski and Zdravko Čolić, among others.

In the 1990s, the band Mostar Sevdah Reunion was assembled in Mostar, and in the early 2000s rose to prominence on the world music scene, receiving prominent awards for their lively interpretations of sevdalinkas (which fused sevdalinka with contemporary musical styles such as jazz, funk and rock) and introducing many people outside of Bosnia to the genre of the sevdalinka. Equally popular today are songwriters/performers Damir Imamović, Božo Vrećo and Amira Medunjanin, the latter dubbed by the music journalist and author Garth Cartwright as "Bosnia's Billie Holiday".

== Sevdah jazz ==
Sevdah jazz fusion music blends the soulful, melancholic melodies of traditional Bosnian sevdalinka folk songs with the sophisticated, improvisational rhythms of jazz and blues. The instruments used are usually accordion, flamenco guitar, clarinet, double bass, celesta and violin.

== Notable songs ==
Some famous sevdalinka songs

- Il' je vedro, il' oblačno (It's either clear (no clouds in the sky), or clouded)
- Ah što ćemo ljubav kriti (Why Should We Hide Our Love)
- Da Sam Ptica (If I Were a Bird)
- Moj golube (My dove)
- Grana od bora, pala kraj mora (A Branch of Pine, Fell by the Sea)
- Karanfile Cvijeće Moje (Carnation, My Flower)
- Kraj potoka bistre vode (By a Stream of Crystal Clear Water)
- Omer-beže na kuli sjeđaše (Bey Omer Sits on the Tower)
- Razbolje se lijepa Hajrija (Beautiful Hajrija Became Ill)
- Razbolje se Sultan Sulejman (The Sultan Suleiman Became Ill)
- Sejdefu majka buđaše (Sejdefa's Mother Wakes Her)
- Snijeg pade na behar na voće (Snow Fell on the Blossom, on the Fruit)
- Što te nema (Why Aren't You Here)
- Sve behara i sve cvjeta (Everything Blossoms and Everything Blooms)
- Tekla rijeka potokom i jazom (The River Flowed Through the Stream and Divide)
- Teško meni jadnoj u Saraj'vu samoj (It's Difficult for Me, a Poor Girl Alone in Sarajevo)
- U Stambolu Na Bosforu (In Istanbul on the Bosphorous)
- Zapjevala sojka ptica (The Blue Jay Bird Sang)
- Zaplakala šećer Đula (The Sweet Rose Wept)
- Zaplakala stara majka (The Elderly Mother Wept)
- Zmaj od Bosne (Dragon of Bosnia)
- Zvijezda tjera mjeseca (The Star Chases the Moon)

Other Bosnian folk songs often mentioned as sevdalinka-s

- Crven Fesić (Little Red Fez)
- Emina
- Čudna jada od Mostara grada (Strange Wretch from the Town of Mostar)
- Djevojka sokolu zulum učinila (The Girl Perpetrated Cruelty on the Falcon)
- Došla voda od brijega do brijega (The Water Came from Hill to Hill)
- Karanfil se na put sprema (Karanfil Prepares for a Journey)
- Ko se ono brijegom šeće? (Who Is Walking on the Hill?)
- Lijepi li su Mostarski dućani (Mostar's Shops Are Beautiful)
- Mila majko, šalji me na vodu (Dear Mother, Send Me to the Water)
- Moj dilbere (My Darling)
- Mujo kuje konja po mjesecu (Mujo Shoes the Horse in the Moonlight)
- Sinoć ja i moja kona (Last Night, My Neighbor and I)
- Tamburalo momče uz tamburu (The Boy Played the Tamburica)
- U lijepom starom gradu Višegradu (In the Beautiful Old Town of Višegrad)
- Vino piju nane age Sarajlije (The Aghas of Sarajevo Drink Wine)

== Examples ==
- Anadolka
- Kad ja pođoh (Guitar) (Flute)
- Ne Klepeći Nanulama
- Što te nema (Hasanagin Sevdah)
- U Stambolu na Bosforu
- Žute Dunje
