= Galija discography =

- The first Galija lineup
- Studio albums: 15
- Live albums: 1
- Compilation albums: 5
- Singles: 2

This is the discography of Serbian and former Yugoslav rock band Galija. This discography consists of 15 studio albums, 1 live album, 2 7-inch singles, and 5 compilation albums. This list does not include solo material or side projects performed by the members.

== Studio albums ==
Title	Released
Prva plovidba	1979
Druga plovidba	1980
Ipak verujem u sebe	1982
Bez naglih skokova	1984
Digni ruku	1986
Daleko je Sunce	1988
Korak do slobode	1989
Istorija, ti i ja	1991
Karavan	1994
Trinaest	1996
Voleti voleti	1997
Južnjačka uteha	1999
Dobro jutro, to sam ja	2005
Mesto pored prozora	2010
U raju iznad oblaka	2018

== Live albums ==
Title	Released
Ja jesam odavde	1998

== Compilation albums ==
Title	Released
Još uvek sanjam (Najveći hitovi)	1990
Ni rat ni mir (Odlomci iz trilogije)	1991
Večita plovidba	1997
The Best Of	2008
Oženiše me muzikom	2009

== Singles ==
Title	Released
"Pravo slavlje" / "Na Drini ćuprija"	1991
Jednom u sto godina	1992

== Books ==
- Galija, Milan Kerković (1995)
