= Oj Igmane =

EP by Zehra Deović
- Released: 2 October 1963
- Genre: folk
- Label: Jugoton

Zehra Deović chronology
Pjesme iz Bosne (1962)	Oj Igmane (1963)	Ja prošetah čaršijom (1963)

Oj Igmane (Oh, Igman) is the second release by Bosnian folk singer Zehra Deović. It was released 2 October 1963 through the label Jugoton.

== Track listing ==
No.	Title	Writer(s)	Length
1.	"Oj Igmane" (Oh, Igman)	Jozo Penava
2.	"Sarajevo behara ti tvoga" (Sarajevo and Your Blossoms)	Jozo Penava; Zaim Imamović
3.	"Slavuj pjeva na beharli grani" (The Nightingale Sings on a Branch of Blossoms)	Jozo Penava; Zaim Imamović
4.	"Uzalud se mi voljesmo" (We Loved Each Other in Vain)	Jozo Penava

== Personnel ==
- Narodni Ansambl Ismeta Alajbegovića "Šerbe" – ensemble
