= Pjesme iz Bosne =

EP by Zehra Deović
- Released: 11 December 1962
- Genre: folk
- Label: Jugoton

Zehra Deović chronology
Pjesme iz Bosne (1962)	Oj Igmane (1963)

Pjesme iz Bosne (Songs from Bosnia) is the debut release by Bosnian folk singer Zehra Deović. It was released 11 December 1962 and re-released with an alternate cover in 1964 through the label Jugoton.

== Track listing ==
No.	Title	Writer(s)	Length
1.	"Tebi majko misli lete" (Your Thoughts Are Flying Mother)	Nikola Škrba; Ismet Alajbegović
2.	"Rumen cvijet" (Florid Flower)	Zaim Imamović
3.	"Aj, sinoć meni prođe ašiklija" (Last Night My Crush Passed Me)	Bosnian folk song
4.	"Haj, jedva čekam da se mrak navuče" (I Can Barely Wait for Nightfall)	Jozo Penava

== Personnel ==
=== Instruments ===
- Ismet Alajbegović – accordion
- Jovica Petković – accordion

=== Crew ===
- Jozo Ćetković – photography
