= Oženiše me muzikom =

Compilation album by Galija
- Released: 2009
- Recorded: 1979–1996
- Genre: Rock; Progressive rock Folk rock
- Label: PGP-RTS
- Producer: Various

Galija chronology
Dobro jutro, to sam ja (2005)	Oženiše me muzikom (2009)	Mesto pored prozora (2010)

Oženiše me muzikom (trans. They Married Me to Music) is a 3-piece compilation album from the Serbian rock band Galija, released in 2009. With the release of the album the band marked thirty years from the release of their debut album Prva plovidba. Oženiše me muzikom features two discs with a choice of Galija songs recorded during 1979-1996 period (the choice was made by the band members Nenad Milosavljević and Predrag Milosavljević), and a DVD entitled Kamera kao svedok (Camera as a Witness), with a choice of Galija music videos (the choice was made by Nenad Milosavljević).

== Track listing ==
=== Disc One ===
1. "Gospi" – 4:51
2. "Decimen" – 9:48
3. "Avanturista" – 4:25
4. "Letnja pesma" – 4:36
5. "Posrednik" – 7:32
6. "Bilo je to jednom" – 6:24
7. "Da li postoji put" – 7:45
8. "Još uvek sanjam" – 5:29
9. "Burna pijana noć" – 4:44
10. "Meksiko" – 4:50
11. "San" – 4:57
12. "Bilo je dobro" – 4:00
13. "Jednom" – 5:07
14. "Digni ruku" – 3:28

=== Disc Two ===
1. "Da li si spavala" – 3:10
2. "Žena koje nema" – 4:10
3. "Nebo nad Makarskom" – 3:50
4. "Kao i obično" – 4:03
5. "Noć" – 5:08
6. "Kad me pogledaš" – 4:38
7. "Trava" – 2:51
8. "Trube" – 3:36
9. "Da me nisi" – 3:52
10. "Seti se maja" – 3:17
11. "Pravo slavlje" – 4:20
12. "Na Drini ćuprija" – 2:53
13. "Dodirni me" – 5:43
14. "Mlada, lepa i pametna" – 4:43
15. "Uzalud se trudiš" – 5:16
16. "Od kad te nema" – 3:42
17. "Narode moj" – 4:18
18. "Uzalud" – 4:19
19. "Cvetom do nje" – 3:11

=== Kamera kao svedok ===
1. "Još uvek sanjam"
2. "Burna pijana noć"
3. "Žena koje nema"
4. "Da li si spavala"
5. "Skadarska"
6. "Na tvojim usnama"
7. "Kad me pogledaš"
8. "Pod noktima"
9. "Seti se maja"
10. "Trube"
11. "Da me nisi"
12. "Godina"
13. "Pevajmo"
14. "Dodirni me"
15. "Ja nisam odavde"
16. "Veruj mi"
17. "Otkad te nema"
18. "Balada o očevima"
19. "Uzalud"

== Personnel ==
- Nenad Milosavljević - vocals, acoustic guitar, harmonica
- Predrag Milosavljević - vocals, tambourine
- Goran Ljubisavljević - guitar
- Predrag Branković - bass guitar
- Boban Pavlović - drums
- Ljubodrag Vukadinović - keyboards
- Dušan Radivojević - guitar
- Zoran Radosavljević - bass guitar
- Nebojša Marković - keyboards
- Branislav Radulović - guitar
- Saša Lokner - keyboards
- Jean-Jacques Roscam - guitar
- Bratislav Zlatković - keyboards, flute, guitar
- Predrag Milanovic - bass guitar
- Dragutin Jakovljević - guitar
- Bratislav Milosević - bass guitar
- Oliver Jezdić - keyboards
