= Galija =

Serbian rock band

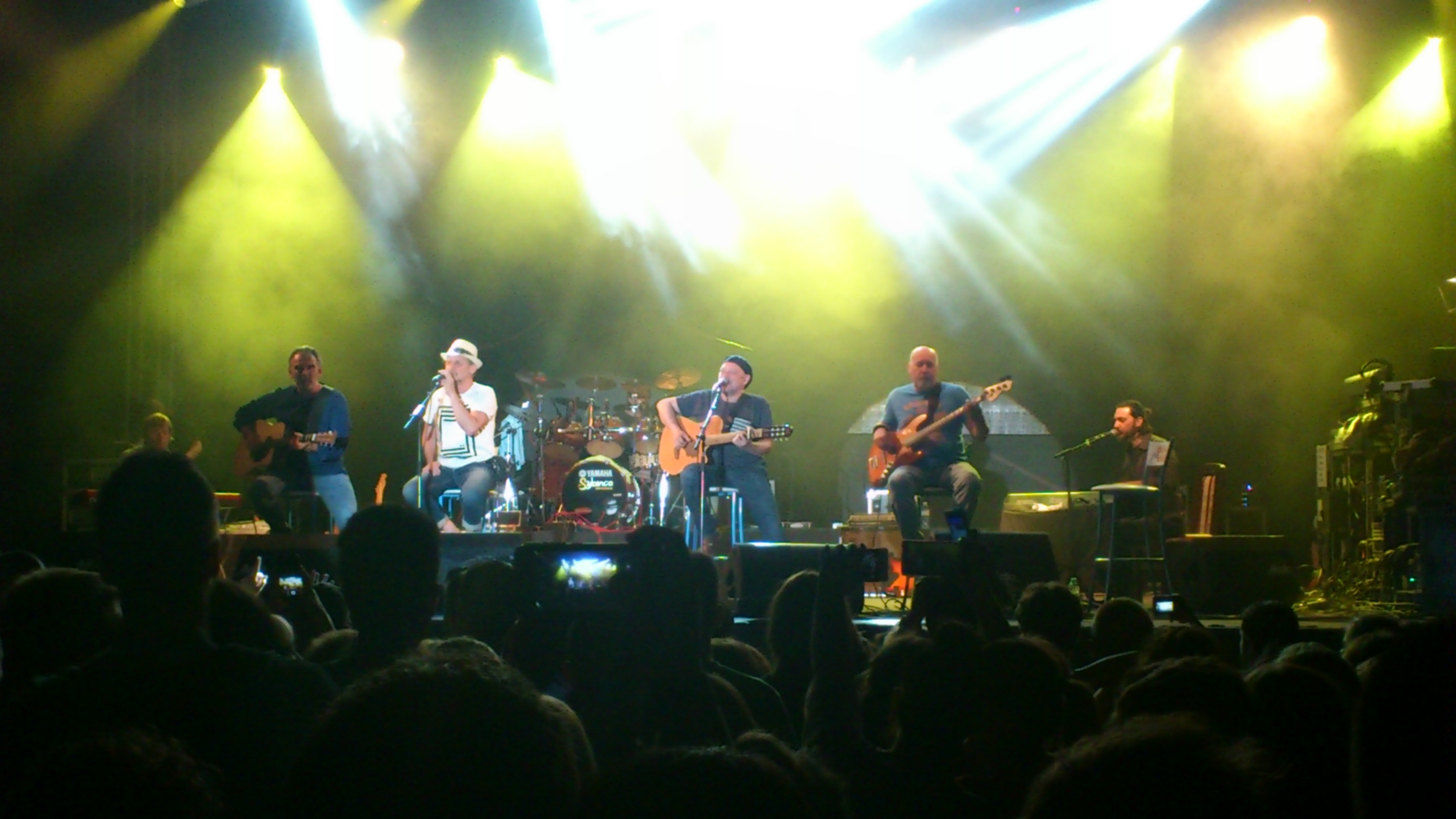
- Galija performing in Niš in 2016

Background information
- Origin: Niš, Serbia
- Genres: Progressive rock; symphonic rock; blues rock; rock; art rock; folk rock
- Years active: 1977–present
- Labels: PGP-RTB, PGP-RTS, Raglas Records
- Members: Nenad Milosavljević; Predrag Milosavljević; Boban Pavlović; Dragutin Jakovljević; Slaviša Pavlović; Ivan Ilić; Goran Antović
- Past members: List: Goran Ljubisavljević Predrag Branković Nenad Tančić Bratislav Stamenković Zoran Stanković Ljubodrag Vukadinović Zoran Radosavljević Dušan Radivojević Nebojša Marković Zoran Stamenković Branislav Radulović Ljubomir Mišić Saša Lokner Aleksandar Ralev Jean Jacques Roskam Bratislav Zlatković Predrag Milanović Dušan Karadžić Oliver Jezdić Bratislav Milošević Saša Ranđelović Jan Vrba Miloš Krstić
- Website: www.galija.rs

Galija (Serbian Cyrillic: Галија; lit. 'Galley') is a Serbian and Yugoslav rock band formed in Niš in 1977. The central figures of the group are brothers Nenad Milosavljević (vocals, acoustic guitar, harmonica) and Predrag Milosavljević (vocals), the two and the drummer Boban Pavlović being the mainstay members of the band. Galija's initial releases were progressive rock-oriented, but in the mid-1980s the band moved towards more mainstream rock sound to large commercial success.

At the time of Galija formation, Nenad Milosavljević had already gained the attention of Yugoslav public as singer-songwriter. The group released their debut album Prva plovidba in 1979, featuring Predrag Milosavljević as guest vocalist. With the release of their second album Druga plovidba in 1980, Predrag Milosavljević became the group's official member. The band managed to gain a loyal fanbase and score several hits, before switching to mainstream rock sound in mid-1980s. The arrival of guitarist Jean Jacques Roskam and multi-instrumentalist Bratislav "Bata" Zlatković, alongside collaboration with poet Radoman Kanjevac–who would replace Predrag Milosavljević as the band's principal lyricist–resulted in the album trilogy consisting of Daleko je Sunce (1988), Korak do slobode (1989) and Istorija, ti i ja (1991). The albums, featuring multi-layered and politically provocative lyrics, achieved critical acclaim and commercial success, the group entering the 1990s as one of the most popular Serbian bands. In mid-1990s, the band's association with the ruling Socialist Party of Serbia led to criticism coming from sizable part of rock fans and music press. Predrag Milosavljević left the band in 1995, and the group went on hiatus in late 1990s. Galija returned to the scene in mid-2000s, with the lineup featuring both of Milosavljević brothers, remaining one of the top acts of the Serbian rock scene since.

== Band history ==
=== Origins and formation (early 1970s–1977) ===
Galija frontman Nenad Milosavljević started performing while still in his teenage years. Influenced by the hippie movement, he started off by performing covers of international hits in Niš parks and on beaches of the Yugoslav Adriatic coast, playing acoustic guitar and harmonica. He had his first public appearances in early 1970s, at Evenings of Acoustic Music and Evenings of Anglistics held in his home city, as well as at Evening of Poetry and Music held as a part of the Niš Film Festival, performing his own songs, as well as covers of songs by foreign acts. He gained the attention of the country's public with his appearance on the Evening of Free Forms at the 1973 Subotica Youth Festival. He gained additional attention when his song "Ta je ulica meni znana" ("That Street is Known to Me"), composed on a poem by Sergei Yesenin, was performed at the 1974 Belgrade Spring Festival by popular Niš band Lutajuća Srca.

Soon after his first successes, Milosavljević got the opportunity to compose music for the theatre play Etide (Études), in which he also appeared in the role of the troubadour. This was followed by his collaborations with the Niš Puppet Theatre, Niš Student Theatre, Niš Youth Theatre and the amateur theatre Treća polovina (Third Half). After he wrote music for Treća Polovina play Ljubav i Oliver (Love and Oliver), which was to be performed by a band throughout the play, he invited members of Niš band Dva Lustera (Two Chandeliers) to perform his songs in the play. They held their first rehearsal together on 4 January 1976. On 11 April 1977, Milosavljević held a concert in the building of Niš National Theatre, with Dva Lustera performing as his backing band. After the concert, Milosavljević and Dva Lustera members agreed to start working together as a band. They chose to name the band Galija, after a famous kafana in Niš, a popular gathering place for Niš rockers. The first lineup of the group consisted of Nenad Milosavljević (vocals, acoustic guitar, harmonica), Goran Ljubisavljević (guitar), Predrag Branković (bass guitar), Nenad Tančić (drums) and Bratislav Stamenković (keyboards). Tančić soon left the band due to his mandatory stint in the Yugoslav People's Army, and was replaced by Boban Pavlović, who would, during the following years, remain one of rare mainstay members of the band.

=== Progressive rock years (1977–1983) ===
The first lineup of the band

Initially, in addition to their own songs, Galija performed covers of songs by The Rolling Stones, Eagles, Pink Floyd, Genesis and other acts, appearing on stage in 18th century uniforms borrowed from Niš theatres. In 1978, performing with the new keyboard player Zoran Stanković, Galija won the first place at the prominent Gitarijada festival in Zaječar. Several months after Gitarijada, they performed at the Youth Festival in Subotica with Ljubodrag Vukadinović playing the keyboards. Later during the year. they performed as the opening band on Smak tour, and at the end of the year they performed at the BOOM Festival in Novi Sad.

In 1979, the band released their debut album Prva plovidba (The First Sail), with A-side titled "Isplovljenje" ("Sailing Out") and B-side titled "Uplovljenje" ("Sailing In"). The band released the album through PGP-RTB record label; all of the group's future releases (with an exception of one compilation album) would be released through the label and its successor PGP-RTS. Although the album received mixed reviews in Yugoslav music press, the tracks "Avanturista" ("Adventurer"), "Gospi" ("To the Lady") and "Decimen" became first hits for the band. Nenad Milosavljević's brother Predrag Milosavljević, who wrote most of the album lyrics, appeared on the album as a guest, singing backing vocals. The band went on a promotional tour, during which they performed in Niš at the amphitheatre in the Niš Fortress, the concert featuring a chamber music choir. In 1979, the band also appeared on Bijelo Dugme's Rock Spectacle festival at Belgrade's JNA Stadium, performing in front of approximately 70.000 people alongside Bijelo Dugme, Kako, Mama Rock, Formula 4, Aerodrom, Opus, Senad od Bosne, Boomerang, Prva Ljubav, Prljavo Kazalište, Tomaž Domicelj, Metak, Suncokret, Parni Valjak, Generacija 5, Siluete and other acts. After Galija's appearance at the festival, Ljubisavljević, Branković and Vukadinović left the band. Bass guitarist Zoran "Čupa" Radosavljević, formerly of the band Bubamare (Ladybugs), guitarist Dušan Radivojević and keyboardist Nebojša Marković became the band's new members.

In 1980, the band released their second album, Druga plovidba (The Second Sail), produced by Gordi leader Zlatko Manojlović. The songs were composed by Nenad, and the lyrics were written by Predrag Milosavljević–who also provided backing vocals, this time as an official member of the group–with the exception of the song "U suton" ("At Twiglight"), composed on a poem by Dobriša Cesarić. The band promoted the album in their home city with a concert in Čair Hall, with Zlatko Manojlović making a guest appearance on stage. During the summer, Galija held a number of concerts in student seaside resort in Makarska; during nine following years they would continue to hold regular concerts in the town. In 1980, the band also performed at the Split Festival, playing at Stari plac stadium alongside Azra, Metak, Drago Mlinarec, Generacija 5, Senad od Bosne, Aerodrom, Dado Topić and other acts. In Zenica, the band performed at the Bilino Polje Stadium alongside Riblja Čorba, Maja Odžaklievska, Davorin Popović, Aerodrom, YU Grupa and Vatreni Poljubac, on a concert organized as a celebration of Radio Zenica's 11th anniversary. During this period of their career, Galija achieved huge success with the audience in the Yugoslav republic of Bosnia and Herzegovina, and until the outbreak of Yugoslav Wars, the republic would be the home of Galija's largest fanbase. The Yugoslav press, although mostly critical of the band's second album, praised their concerts, especially Nenad Milosavljević's charismatic on-stage appearance. In late 1980, Pavlović left the band to serve his stint in the Yugoslav Army, and was temporarily replaced by Zoran Stamenković (later of Kerber fame), and the band was also joined by new guitarist Branislav "Bane" Radulović. In 1981, the band performed, alongside Pomaranča, Tunel, Radomir Mihajlović Točak, Piloti, Bulevar, Siluete and other acts, at the second edition of Belgrade Rock Festival in Pionir Hall, playing in front of approximately 10,000 people.

In early 1982, the group released the album Ipak verujem u sebe (Nevertheless I Believe in Myself). The album brought hit ballads "Još uvek sanjam" ("I'm Still Dreaming") and "Burna pijana noć" ("Stormy Drunken Night"). The album was recorded with Ljubomir Mišić playing the drums. By early 1982, Pavlović's army service had finisihed and he rejoined the band. Soon after, Galija performed as the opening band at Joe Cocker's concert in Belgrade's Pionir Hall in Belgrade. In early 1983, they toured Bosnia and Herzegovina with Buldožer, and on 10 June 1983 they held a large concert at Belgrade's Tašmajdan Stadium with Belgrade jazz rock band Potop (The Flood) and Niš hard rock band Kerber as the opening acts. Soon after the concert, Potop leader, keyboardist Aleksandar "Saša" Lokner, became Galija's new keyboardist. In late 1983, owing to their Makarska concerts, Galija were polled "The Best Live Act on the Shore" by Split youth.

=== Shift to mainstream rock (1984–1986) ===
In 1984, Galija released their fourth studio album Bez naglih skokova (Without Sudden Jumps), which marked the band's shift away from progressive rock towards more mainstream-oriented sound. The album was recorded during October 1983 in Manchester and was produced by Nightwing bass guitarist Gordon Rowley (who had previously worked with another band from Niš, Kerber), and was mixed in California. The material was offered to Yugoslav biggest record label Jugoton, but the company did not show interest for the album, so the band once again signed with PGP-RTB. The album featured the track "Ti me svojom hladnoćom ne kušaj" ("Do Not Tempt Me with Your Coldness"), the band's second song to be composed on a poem by Sergei Yesenin, and Saša Lokner debuted as author with the song "Biću tu" ("I'll Be There"). Unlike the band's previous releases, Bez naglih skokova did not bring any hits. Following the album release, the band performed, together with Bajaga i Instruktori, Laboratorija Zvuka and Leb i Sol, on a fundraising concert in Sarajevo for the victims of the 1983 Kopaonik earthquake. During the year, the band started to hold regular concerts in Music Club 81 in Niš, on which they performed covers of international rock hits. During the same year, Lokner joined Bajaga i Instruktori, and was replaced by Aleksandar Ralev. Soon after, Jean Jacques Roskam, a Belgian of Zaire origin, joined Galija as the lead guitarist. Roskam was previously a member of the Belgian progressive rock band Machiavel, partaking in the recording of the band's 1976 self-titled debut. After marrying a girl from the town of Vrgorac near Makarska, Roskam moved to Yugoslavia, where he played with pop rock bands D' Boys and Peđa D' Boy Band, eventually joining Galija.

In 1986, the band released the album Digni ruku (Raise Your Hand), with the title track becoming a hit. The song's refrain featured the verse "Nemaš kartu ni do Prištine" ("You can't even afford a ticket to Priština"), politically provocative in the time of tensions in SAP Kosovo. The band wanted the album cover to feature a provocative image of the Hero of Socialist Labour Alija Sirotanović with a blindfold, which the record label refused. The album featured Roskam's song "Winter's Coming", with lyrics written by Dani Klein, frontress of the Belgian group Vaya Con Dios. The album was produced by Nenad Stefanović "Japanac", and featured guest appearances by Galija former member Saša Lokner (keyboards), Goran Grbić (trumpet), Nenad Petrović (saxophone) and Bobana Stojković (backing vocals). After the album release, Radulović left the band.

=== Album trilogy and peak of popularity (1987–1994) ===
Galija in 1988, from left to right: Jean Jacques Roskam, Predrag Milosavljević, Zoran Radosavljević, Nenad Milosavljević, Bratislav Zlatković and Boban Pavlović

Following Digni ruku release, the band was joined by Bratislav "Bata" Zlatković, a graduate from Sarajevo Music Academy and multi-instrumentalist–in Galija he played guitar, keyboards and flute–and started to collaborate with lyricist Radoman Kanjevac. Despite the fact that the two had never before worked with a professional rock band–prior to Galija, Zlatković had little experience in rock music, and Kanjevac, at the time a journalist for Radio Belgrade, had never written song lyrics–they brought fresh ideas to the group's work. Kanjevac brought up an idea of releasing an album trilogy which would deal with contemporary political turmoil in Yugoslavia, and Zlatković introduced folk music influences into the band's sound.

In 1988, Galija released the album Daleko je Sunce (Distant is the Sun), named after a novel by Dobrica Ćosić. The album was produced by Dušan "Šane" Petrović, and featured numerous guest musicians, including keyboardists Saša Lokner and Kornelije Kovač, bass guitarist Nenad Stefanović "Japanac", drummer Ivan Vdović "Vd" and Fejat Sejdić Trumpet Orchestra. Songs were titled after the works of writers Dobrica Ćosić, Branko Ćopić, Ivo Andrić, Laza Lazarević and Aleksa Šantić. Daleko je sunce brought new attention of the media and of the younger audience. The album's biggest hits were the ballad "Da li si spavala" ("Did You Sleep") and folk-oriented "Mi znamo sudbu" ("We Know Our Destiny"), both composed by Zlatković and featuring lyrics co-written by Zlatković and Kanjevac. Minor hits included "Intimni odnosi" ("Intimate Relationship"), "Orlovi rano lete" ("Eagles Start Flying Early ") and "Kao i obično" ("Like Usual"). The song "Zebre i bizoni" ("Zebras and Buffalos") featured provocative lyrics dealing with Josip Broz Tito's residence at Brijuni. On the insistent of the record label, "Zebre i bizoni" lyrics were omitted from the inner sleeve. Due to lyrics perceived as politically provocative, the editors of Radio Belgrade and Radio Zagreb marked two songs from Daleko je sunce as unsuitable for broadcasting, while the editors of Radio Sarajevo decided not to broadcast four songs from the album. The promotional tour included concerts in Belgrade Youth Center and Muzički klub 81, on which the band also celebrated their tenth anniversary. After the concerts, long-time bass guitarist Zoran Radosavljević left the band, and was replaced by Predrag Milanović.

The second part of the trilogy, Korak do slobode (One Step to Freedom), was released in 1989. The album was produced by Saša Habić. While Daleko je sunce featured both Predrag Milosavljević and Radoman Kanjevac as lyricists, all lyrics for Korak do slobode were authored by Kanjevac, with Milosavljević making only a contribution to "Pevaju jutra" ("The Mornings Are Singing") lyrics, much to his dissatisfaction. The album's opening and closing theme were composed by Bratislav Zlatković and played by Zlatković (flute) and guest performer Boban Marković (trumpet). The song "Sloboda" ("Freedom") featured Kerber frontman Goran Šepa on vocals. The album hits included "Na tvojim usnama" ("On Your Lips"), "Kopaonik", "Korak do slobode" and "Kad me pogledaš" ("When You Look at Me"). As its predecessor, Korak do slobode featured politically provocative lyrics and imagery: the reggae song "Ljubavna pesma" ("Love Song"), composed by Roskam and sung by himself and Nenad Milosavljević, featured ironic lyrics dealing with rising nationalism in Yugoslavia, the title track included the verse "Ide četa čela namrštena, među njima najboljega nema" ("The company is marching with frowns on their faces, the best one is not among them"), taken from the song "Pesma o Krcunu" ("Song about Krcun") by folk singer Slobodan Mulina, dedicated to Slobodan Penezić "Krcun", Yugoslav war hero and communist politician who died in a car accident under suspicious circumstances, and the album cover featured an image of army trucks during a military exercise. Korak do slobode was well received by fans and critics. At the end of the year, the music magazine Pop Rock proclaimed "Na tvojim usnama" the Song of the Year, and Nenad Milosavljević won the Composer of the Year Award at MESAM festival (although Zlatković had composed the album's biggest hits). The promotional tour included an open-air concert in Dušanova Street in Niš, in front of some 20,000 people. Soon after, the band was joined by new bass guitarist, Dušan Karadžić.

In early 1990, Galija, alongside Yugoslav rock bands Riblja Čorba, Valentino, Viktorija and Bajaga i Instruktori, performed in Timișoara, Romania, at three-day concerts organized two months after the Romanian Revolution. All five acts played on three concerts held in Timișoara Olympia Hall in front of some 20,000 people each night. During the same year, Galija released the greatest hits compilation album Još uvek sanjam (Najveći hitovi) (I'm Still Dreaming (Greatest Hits)), with several of their old songs re-recorded for the album. At the time of the first multi-party elections in Yugoslavia, the group, on the idea of Kanjevac and journalist Petar "Peca" Popović, prepared an EP with four songs: "On je isti kao on" ("He Is just like Him"), "Ti si moja jedina partija" ("You Are My Only Party"), "Posle svega" ("After Everything") and "Komunista" ("Communist"), the latter featuring Romani singer Šaban Bajramović on vocals. The EP should have featured provocative lyrics dealing with the uncertain future of the country–with "On je isti kao on" ironically comparing President of Serbia Slobodan Milošević to Josip Broz Tito–and was, due to political censorship, never released.

With the album Istorija, ti i ja (History, You and Me), released in 1991, Galija's album trilogy was complete. The album was produced by multi-instrumentalist and Crvena Jabuka member Nikša Bratoš and featured guest appearances by the band's former keyboardist Saša Lokner, bass guitarist Slaviša Pavlović "Stenli", flutist Bora Dugić and the early music ensemble Renesans. Istorija, ti i ja brought some of the band's biggest hits: "Skadarska" ("Skadarska Street"), "Trube" ("Trumpets"), "Da me nisi" ("If You Haven't"), "Trava" ("Grass") and "Seti se maja" ("Remember May"). Soon after the album release, due to growing tensions in the country, Roskam left the band, returning to Vrgorac; he would continue his musical career by collaborating with Croatian pop singer Tony Cetinski. Dragutin Jakovljević "Guta" came to the band as the replacement for Roskam.

On 11 June 1991, Galija performed as the opening band on Bob Dylan's concert at Zemun Stadium. In September, the group held their last pre-war concert in Sarajevo, in the club FIS. During the year, the band released the compilation album Ni rat ni mir (Odlomci iz trilogije) (Neither War nor Peace (Passages from the Trilogy)), which, alongside songs from the trilogy, included two new tracks: "Pravo slavlje" ("Real Celebration", also a word play, with "Pravoslavlje" meaning "Orthodoxy" in Serbian) and "Na Drini ćuprija" ("The Bridge on the Drina", named after Ivo Andrić's novel). The 7-inch single with the two songs was given as a gift to the audience on their concert in Sava Centar, which featured guest appearances by Fejat Sejdić Trumpet Orchestra, St. George Choir and pianist Miloš Petrović. A year later, they held another concert in Sava Centar, as a part of celebration of the publishing house Srpska književna zadruga one-hundred-year anniversary. The band's guest on the concert was actress and singer Olivera Katarina, which was her first public appearance after many years she had spent away from the public. For this occasion, the band recorded another gift single, entitled Jednom u sto godina (Once in a Hundred Years) and featuring a cover of Film song "Mi nismo sami" ("We Are Not Alone") and a cover of Indexi song "Sanjam" ("I'm Dreaming"), the latter featuring an old recording of Ivo Andrić's voice. With the ongoing wars in Croatia and in Bosnia, the single, with a cover of a song by a Zagreb-based band (Film) and a song by a Sarajevo-based band (Indexi), was perceived in Serbian public as an anti-war and deeply symbolic record.

At the beginning of 1993, Zlatković left the band; three years later he would release his only solo album A be da be, after which he would devote himself to composing film and theatre music. Oliver Jezdić became the group's new keyboardist, and Bratislav Milošević joined as the new bass guitarist. In 1994, Galija released the double album Karavan (Caravan). The album was recorded in Cyprus and produced by Saša Habić. Part of the album lyrics was written by Kanjevac, and part by Predrag Milosavljević. The album featured a guest appearance by Generacija 5 guitarist Dragan Jovanović on acoutic guitar, and included a cover of the traditional song "Petlovi" ("Roosters"). After Karavan was released, Kanjevac ended his collaboration with Galija.

=== Galija during political turmoil, without Predrag Milosavljević and hiatus (1994–1999) ===
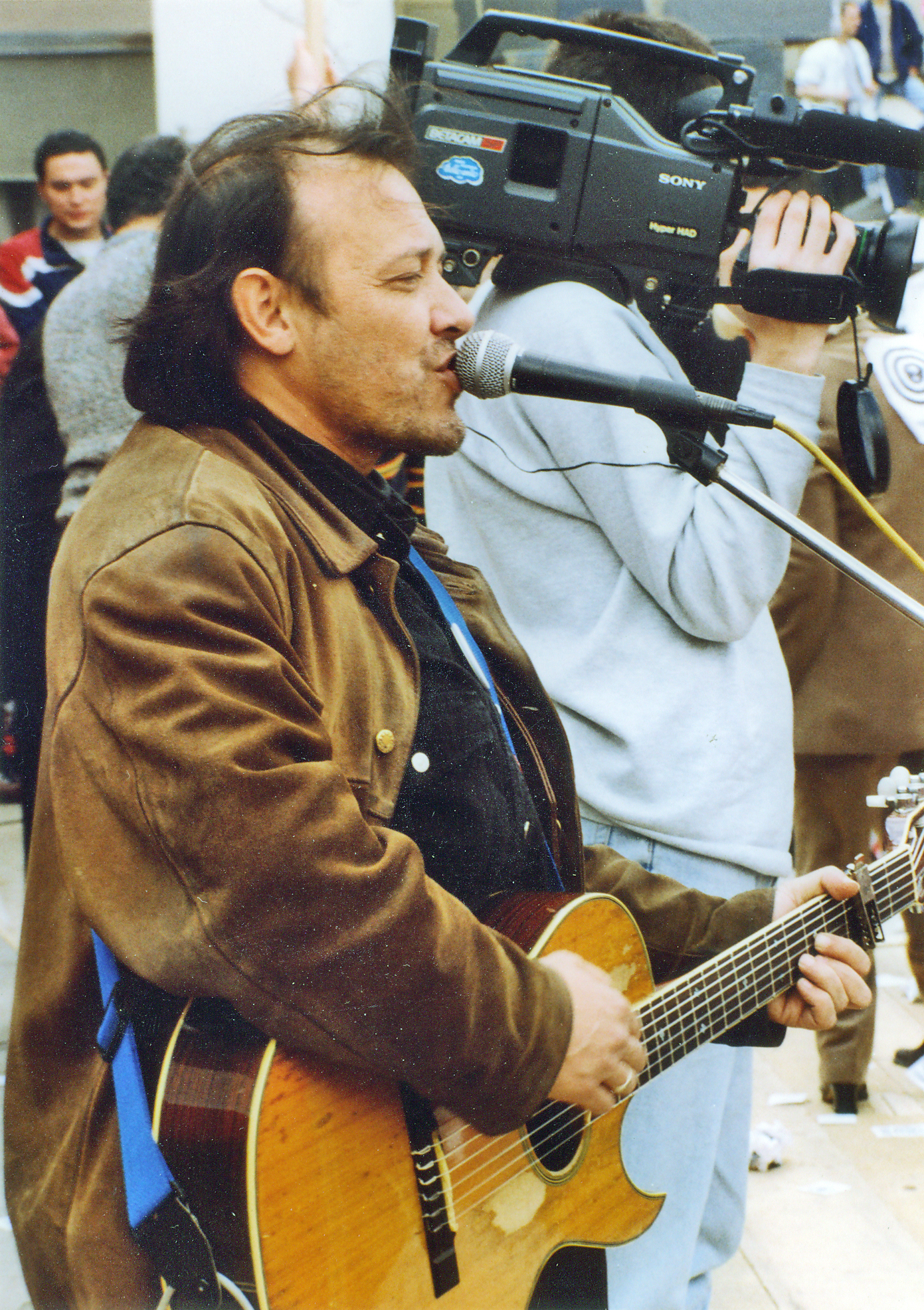
Nenad Milosavljević performing on a protest against NATO bombing of FR Yugoslavia in Niš in 1999

During the summer of 1994, Galija promoted Karavan with a large number of free open-air concerts held on city squares across Serbia, including a concert in the park outside Belgrade's Old Palace and in Niš's Čair park. At the time, the group started to perform on events organized by the ruling Socialist Party of Serbia, which–although the band had never adopted the Party's nationalist rhetoric or openly promoted the Party in their work–provoked part of the Serbian public and music press to label Galija as a "state band" and "court band"; Galija's collaboration with the regime of Slobodan Milošević during the time when most of Serbian (both mainstream and underground) rock acts protested against it would influence the reception of the band's work in years to follow. Following the promotional concert in Niš's Čair park, Predrag Milosavljević left the band.

In 1996, the group released the album Trinaest (Thirteen). Alongside Predrag Milosavljević's lyrics, Trinaest featured lyrics from poems by Branko Radičević, Stevan Raičković and Petar Pajić. The album featured guest appearance by Ognjan Radivojević on Hammond organ. During the same year, author Milan Kerković published the band's biography entitled simply Galija. The following year, the band released the compilation album Večita plovidba (Eternal Sail) and the studio album Voleti voleti (To Love to Love), which brought the hit "Kotor". The album lyrics were written by lyricist Slobodan Kostadinović. The track "Ko bi drugi" ("Who Else Would") featured Boban Pavlović on lead vocals. Voleti voleti promotional tour included concerts in Belgrade's Sava Centar, the building of Serbian National Theatre in Novi Sad and in Niš's Čair Hall. The recording of the concert held in Čair Hall on 8 March 1998 was released on the live album Ja jesam odavde (I Am From Around Here). On the concert, the band performed in the new lineup, featuring Nenad Milosavljević (acoustic guitar and vocals), Saša Ranđelović (guitar), Dragutin Jakovljević (guitar), Boban Pavlović (drums) and Slaviša Pavlović (bass guitar), with Saša Lokner performing as guest keyboardist and Ivana Ćosić and Gordana Svilarević providing backing vocals.

In 1999, the band released the album Južnjačka uteha (Southern Comfort), produced by Ivan Vlatković and featuring covers of traditional Serbian songs. The album's only song authored by the band was "Uteha" ("Comfort"). The album was not followed by promotional concerts, and shortly after its release the band went on a hiatus. During the hiatus, Milosavljević brothers worked on the soundtrack for Zdravko Šotra's hit film Zona Zamfirova.

The band's long-time bass guitarist Zoran Radosavljević "Čupa", who had, after leaving Galija, rejoined Bubamare and in 2000 became the director of Niš Cultural Center, died on 6 September 2004.

=== Comeback and renewed popularity (2005–present) ===
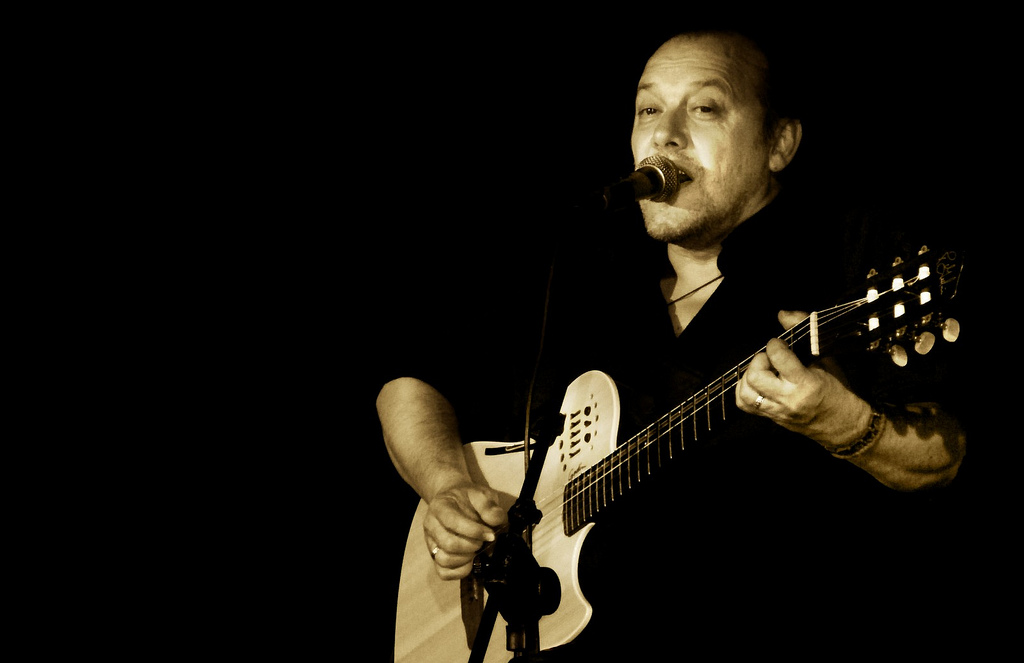
Nenad Milosavljević performing in 2008

The band's comeback album Dobro jutro, to sam ja (Good Morning, It's Me) was released in 2005. With Predrag Milosavljević returning to the band, the album also featured, alongside Milosavljević brothers, Boban Pavlović (drums), Dragutin Jakovljević (guitar), Slaviša Pavlović (bass guitar) and Jan Vrba (keyboards). The album was produced by Predrag Milosavljević and Jakovljević, and featured keyboardist Laza Ristovski and singers Aleksandra Kovač and Kristina Kovač as guests. The following year, keyboardist Ivan Ilić became the band's new member, and PGP-RTS released a best of compilation Najveći hitovi (Greatest Hits), featuring digitally remastered eighteen tracks spanning the band's whole career. The band's new guitarist Miloš Krstić debuted on Galija's performance at the 2008 Belgrade Beer Fest. In 2009, to celebrate 30 years since the release of their debut album, the band released the box set Oženiše me muzikom (They Got Me Married to Music), featuring a double compilation album entitled Zapisi sa vinila (Recordings from Vinyl), consisting of 33 tracks recorded during 1979–1996 period, and a DVD entitled Kamera kao svedok (Camera as a Witness), with 19 videos the band had recorded during the same period. In 2010, keyboardist Goran Antović became a new member of the group.

In October 2010, the band released the studio album, Mesto pored prozora (A Seat by the Window). The album title was selected by fans out of four suggestions via e-mail poll. Videos for the songs "Zločin i kazna" ("Crime and Punishment"), which featured actor Srđan Todorović, and "Čuvam ti mesto pored prozora" ("I'm Keeping a Seat by the Window for You") were directed by comics artist and animated film director Aleksa Gajić. The song "Ne bolujem ja" ("I'm Not Blue") featured veteran jazz bassist Miša Blam as guest. In May 2011, Galija performed in Sarajevo's club Sloga, twenty years since their last concert in the city and for the first time since the end of the Bosnian War. The band celebrated 35 years of work with the tour entitled Galija još uvek sanja (Galija Is Still Dreaming), which included two concerts in Belgrade's Sava Centar, on 22 and 23 October 2011. The setlist for two concerts consisted mostly of the band's ballads in new arrangements, and the concerts featured numerous guests: the band's former member Jean Jacques Roskam, traditional music singer Biljana Krstić, rock musician Kiki Lesendrić, pop musician Vlado Georgiev, actors Goran Sultanović, Sloboda Mićalović and Vuk Kostić, and TV host Ivan Ivanović.

In 2014, following the 2014 Serbian parliamentary election, Nenad Milosavljević became a deputy in the National Assembly of Serbia as a member of Socialist Party of Serbia. On 22 April 2016, the band performed, alongside Riblja Čorba, Van Gogh, Piloti and Električni Orgazam, at the opening of renovated Tašmajdan Stadium. The band celebrated their 40th anniversary with two concerts. The first one was a part of the festival 5 do 100 (5 to 100), which was held on 4 July 2016 at Niš Fortress. The festival featured Galija, the band Novembar, celebrating their 25th anniversary, and the band Van Gogh, celebrating their 30th anniversary (the combined "age" of the bands was 95, thus the title of the festival). The second concert was held in Belgrade's Sports Hall Ranko Žeravica on 29 December 2016. The concert featured Vreme Čuda as the opening band and the band's former members Aleksandar Ranđelović and Saša Lokner and Kerber frontman Goran Šepa as guests. Between two concerts, in November 2016, the band released the Celtic rock single "Nešto me goni" ("Something Makes Me Fight"), announcing their upcoming studio album.

The band's fourteenth studio album, entitled U raju iznad oblaka (In Heaven Above the Clouds), was released in May 2018. The album was produced by Saša Habić, with whom Galija collaborated again after fourteen years and who also played keyboards on the album recording. Most of the album lyrics were written by Predrag Milosavljević. For the songs "Kad bi ti otišla iz ovog grada" ("I You Would Leave This Town"), "Voleo sam" ("I Used to Love") and "Don Ramiro" Nenad Milosavljević composed music on poems by Matija Bećković, Pero Zubac and Milorad Mitrović respectively. The rock epic "Don Ramiro" was described by the critics as the band's return to their progressive rock roots. The promotional tour included concerts in Sava Centar and Čair Hall. The promotional concert in Čair Hall was announced by the Milosavljević brothers unannounced unplugged performance in Niš's Obrenovićeva Street on 24 October 2018. In 2020, the group was awarded with the North Macedonian music award Zlatnata bubamara (Golden Ladybug) for their "constant musical value". On 3 September of the same year, the group held an acoustic concert at Heraclea Lyncestis aphiteatre near Bitola.

The band's former guitarist Jean Jacques Roskam died on 26 October 2020. The band's former lyricist Radoman Kanjevac died on 9 November 2025.

In August 2026, the band performed on the closing night of the 32nd edition of the Nišville jazz festival, held in their home city. The festival's closing night, dedicated to 60 years of rock music in Niš, featured main stage performances by Niš groups Daltoni, Galija, Bohemija and Lavina.

== Legacy ==
Galija song "Intimni odnosi" was covered in 2011 by Serbian soul band Maraqya, on their album Savršen dan (Perfect Day).

In 2021, the album Karavan was polled 87th on the list of 100 Best Serbian Albums Since the Breakup of SFR Yugoslavia. The list was published in the book Kako (ni)je propao rokenrol u Srbiji (How Rock 'n' Roll in Serbia (Didn't) Came to an End). In 2011, the song "Još uvek sanjam" was polled, by the listeners of Radio 202, one of 60 greatest songs released by PGP-RTB/PGP-RTS during the sixty years of the label's existence.

The lyrics of 12 songs by the band (1 written by Predrag Milosavljević, 10 written by Radoman Kanjevac and 1 co-written by Kanjevac and Bata Zlatković) were included in Petar Janjatović's Pesme bratstva, detinjstva & potomstva: Antologija ex YU rok poezije 1967 - 2007 (Songs of Brotherhood, Childhood & Offspring: Anthology of Ex YU Rock Poetry 1967 – 2007).

A street in Niš is named after the group's long-time bass guitarist Zoran Radosavljević "Čupa". Since 2005, a festival entitled Čupin rok memorijal (Čupa's Rock Memorial) is held annually in the city. The band's former guitarist Jean Jacques Roskam was subject of Sergej Kreso's 2008 documentary film Jack, the Balkans & I.

== Discography ==
- Prva plovidba (1979)
- Druga plovidba (1980)
- Ipak verujem u sebe (1982)
- Bez naglih skokova (1984)
- Digni ruku (1986)
- Daleko je Sunce (1988)
- Korak do slobode (1989)
- Istorija, ti i ja (1991)
- Karavan (1994)
- Trinaest (1996)
- Voleti voleti (1997)
- Južnjačka uteha (1999)
- Dobro jutro, to sam ja (2005)
- Mesto pored prozora (2010)
- U raju iznad oblaka (2018)
