= Vuka =

Vuka may refer to:

- Vuka (river), a river in Croatia
- Vuka, Osijek-Baranja County, town and municipality in eastern Croatia
- Vuka, one of the counties of the Independent State of Croatia
- Vuka, Free State, a township in Dihlabeng Local Municipality, South Africa
- Vuka (plant), an African Helichrysum species
- Vuka, a given name and a surname:
  - Vuka Popadić, Serbian war heroine
  - Vuka Šeherović (1903–1976), Bosnian folk singer
  - Marijan Vuka (born 1980), Croatian footballer
  - Vuka, the Ancient Name of Chasca, a character in 2020 video game Genshin Impact

== See also ==
- Vukas, a surname
- Vuca (disambiguation)
