= Ni rat ni mir (Odlomci iz trilogije) =

Compilation album by Galija
- Released: 1991
- Recorded: 1988–1991
- Genre: Rock; art rock; blues rock; folk rock
- Length: 71:03
- Label: PGP-RTB
- Producer: Dušan Petrović; Saša Habić; Nikša Bratoš

Galija chronology
Istorija, ti i ja (1991)	Ni rat ni mir (Odlomci iz trilogije) (1991)	Karavan (1994)

Ni rat ni mir (Odlomci iz trilogije) (trans. Neither War nor Peace (Passages from the Trilogy)) is a compilation album by Serbian and Yugoslav rock band Galija, released in 1991. The album features songs from Galija album trilogy, comprising studio albums Daleko je Sunce (Distant Is the Sun, 1988), Korak do slobode (One Step to Freedom, 1989) and Istorija, ti i ja (History, You and Me, 1991). The compilation also included two new tracks, "Pravo slavlje" ("Real Celebration", also a word play, with "Pravoslavlje" meaning "Orthodoxy" in Serbian) and "Na Drini ćuprija" ("The Bridge on the Drina", named after Ivo Andrić's novel).

== Track listing ==
No.	Title	Length
1.	"Pravo slavlje" ("Real Celebration")	4:15
2.	"Žena koje nema" ("A Woman That Is Not There")	4:11
3.	"Zebre i bizoni" ("Zebras and Buffalos")	2:59
4.	"Da li si spavala" ("Did You Sleep")	3:09
5.	"Korak do slobode" ("One Step to Freedom")	2:52
6.	"Kao i obično" ("Like Usual")	4:02
7.	"Noć" ("Night")	5:07
8.	"Pevaju jutra" ("The Mornings Are Singing")	3:14
9.	"Kad me pogledaš" ("When You Look at Me")	4:38
10.	"Na tvojim usnama" ("On Your Lips")	3:12
11.	"Ljubavna pesma" ("Love Song")	3:30
12.	"Trava" ("Grass")	2:25
13.	"Kao boja tvoga oka" ("Like the Color of Your Eye")	5:35
14.	"Sloboda" ("Freedom")	3:59
15.	"Mi znamo sudbu" ("We Know Our Destiny")	3:26
16.	"Trube" ("Trumpets")	3:35
17.	"Na Drini ćuprija" ("The Bridge on the Drina")	2:54
18.	"Skadarska" ("Skadarska Street")	4:13
19.	"Seti se maja" ("Remember May")	3:!7

== Credits ==
- Nenad Milosavljević - vocals, harmonica
- Predrag Milosavljević - vocals
- Jean Jacques Roscam - guitar
- Bratislav Zlatković - flute
- Dušan Karadžić - bass guitar
- Boban Pavlović - drums
- Zoran Radosavljević - bass guitar
- Predrag Milanović - bass guitar
