= Večita plovidba =

Compilation album by Galija
- Released: 1991
- Recorded: 1979–1991
- Genres: Rock; Progressive rock Folk rock
- Length: 75:39
- Labels: PGP-RTS; Raglas Records
- Producer: Various

Galija chronology
Trinaest (1996)	Večita plovidba (1991)	Voleti voleti (1997)

Večita plovidba (Serbian Cyrillic: Вечита пловидба, trans. Eternal sail) is a compilation album by Serbian and former Yugoslav rock band Galija, released in 1997.

== Track listing ==
1. "Avanturista" - 4:26
2. "Decimen" - 4:53
3. "Gospi" - 3:43
4. "Digni ruku" - 3:12
5. "Još uvek sanjam" - 4:41
6. "Put" - 5:54
7. "Burna pijana noć" - 4:11
8. "Da li si spavala" - 3:09
9. "Kad me pogledaš" - 4:38
10. "Zebre i bizoni" - 2:59
11. "Mi znamo sudbu" - 3:26
12. "Žena koje nema" - 4:11
13. "Na tvojim usnama" - 3:12
14. "Korak do slobode" - 2:52
15. "Skadarska" - 4:13
16. "Trube" - 3:35
17. "Seti se maja" - 3:17
18. "Pravo slavlje" - 4:15

== Credits ==
- Nenad Milosavljević - vocals
- Predrag Milosavljević - vocals
- Jean Jacques Roscam - guitar
- Bata Zlatković - flute
- Dušan Karadžić - bass guitar
- Boban Pavlović - drums
- Zoran Radosavljević - bass guitar
- Predrag Milanović - bass guitar
