= Još uvek sanjam (Najveći hitovi) =

Compilation album by Galija
- Released: 1990
- Recorded: 1988–1990
- Genre: Progressive rock; symphonic rock; rock; art rock; folk rock
- Length: 43:02
- Label: PGP-RTB
- Producer: Saša Habić; Dušan Petrović

Galija chronology
| Korak do slobode (1989) | Još uvek sanjam (Najveći hitovi) (1990) | Istorija, ti i ja (1991) |

Još uvek sanjam (Najveći hitovi) (trans. I'm Still Dreaming (Greatest Hits)) is a compilation album by Serbian and Yugoslav rock band Galija, released in 1990.

Još uvek sanjam (Najveći hitovi) is the first compilation album released by the band, featuring re-recorded versions of some of the band's old hits. Tracks released on the album's A-side are new studio versions of songs from Galija's pre-1988 studio albums, while the tracks appearing on the B-side were taken from the studio albums Daleko je Sunce (1988) and Korak do slobode (1989). The new versions of old songs were recorded in collaboration with producer Saša Habić.

== Track listing ==
Side A
| No. | Title | Length |
|---|---|---|
| 1. | "Gospi" ("To the Lady") | 3:40 |
| 2. | "Još uvek sanjam" ("I'm Still Dreaming") | 4:30 |
| 3. | "Digni ruku" ("Raise Your Hand") | 3:20 |
| 4. | "Put" ("Road") | 6:00 |
| 5. | "Burna pijana noć" ("Stormy Drunken Night") | 4:10 |

Side B
| No. | Title | Length |
|---|---|---|
| 1. | "Da li si spavala" ("Did You Sleep") | 3:04 |
| 2. | "Kad me pogledaš" ("When You Look at Me") | 4:45 |
| 3. | "Na tvojim usnama" ("On Your Lips") | 3:10 |
| 4. | "Zebre i bizoni" ("Zebras and Buffalos") | 3:02 |
| 5. | "Sloboda" ("Freedom") | 3:30 |
| 6. | "Mi znamo sudbu" ("Freedom") | 3:28 |

== Credits ==
- Nenad Milosavljević - vocals
- Predrag Milosavljević - vocals
- Jean Jacques Roskam - guitar
- Bratislav Zlatković - keyboards, flute, guitar
- Zoran Radosavljević - bass guitar
- Predrag Milanović - bass guitar
- Dušan Karadžić - bass guitar
- Boban Pavlović - drums

=== Additional personnel ===
- Saša Habić - producer (tracks: A1, A2, A3, A4, A5, B2, B3, B5)
- Dušan Petrović - producer (tracks: B1, B4, B6)
- Zorica Lakić - design
