= Meksiko =

Meksiko may refer to:

- Novi Dol, formerly known as Meksiko, a hamlet in Dol pri Hrastniku, Municipality of Hrastnik, Slovenia
- "Meksiko", a song on the 1983 album Bez naglih skokova
- Meksiko - ratni dnevnik, a 2000 book by Serbian novelist Vladimir Arsenijević

== See also ==
- Mexico, a country in North America
- Mexico City, capital of Mexico
