= Ne znam šta ću majko =

EP by Zehra Deović
- Released: 11 May 1966
- Genre: folk
- Label: PGP-RTB

Zehra Deović chronology
Oj Igmane (1965)	Ne znam šta ću majko (1966)	Ni Bajrami više nisu (1968)

Ne znam šta ću majko (I Don't Know What I'll Do Mother) is the fifth release by Bosnian folk singer Zehra Deović. It was released 11 May 1966 through the label PGP-RTB.

== Track listing ==
No.	Title	Writer(s)	Length
1.	"Ne znam šta ću majko" (I Don't Know What I'll Do Mother)	Nikola Škrba; Jovica Petković
2.	"Rumena mi ruža procvala" (A Yellow Rose Bloomed for Me)
3.	"Pjesma Romaniji" (A Song for Romanija)	Nikola Škrba; Jovica Petković
4.	"Zašto mi ne dođeš" (Why Don't You Come to Me)	Rade Vidić; Ismet Alajbegović Šerbo

== Personnel ==
- Ansambl Miodraga Todorovića – ensemble
