= Jednom u sto godina =

Single by Galija
- Recorded: 1992
- Genre: Rock
- Length: 8:08
- Label: PGP-RTB

Galija singles chronology
"Pravo slavlje" (1991)	"Jednom u sto godina" (1992)

Jednom u sto godina (lit. 'Once In a Hundred Years') is a 7-inch single release by Serbian and former Yugoslav rock band Galija. The release features a cover of Film song "Mi nismo sami" and a cover of Indexi song "Sanjam", the songs being the only covers ever recorded by Galija. Jednom u sto godina was released as a part of celebration of one hundred years of existence of the publishing house Serbian Literary Guild (thus the title), and the release cover resembles the covers of books published by the Serbian Literary Guild. Jednom u sto godina was given as a gift to the visitors of Galija koncert in Sava Centar held on December 25, 1992.

== Track listing ==
1. "Mi nismo sami" - 3:20
2. "Sanjam" - 4:48

== Personnel ==
- Nenad Milosavljević - vocals
- Predrag Milosavljević - vocals
- Dragutin Jakovljević - guitar
- Bata Zlatković - flute
- Predrag Milanović - bass guitar
- Boban Pavlović - drums
