= Ja jesam odavde =

Live album by Galija
- Released: March 8, 1998
- Recorded: 1998
- Venue: Čair Sports Center, Niš
- Genre: Rock
- Length: 87:26
- Label: PGP-RTS

Galija chronology
Voleti voleti (1997)	Ja jesam odavde (1998)	Južnjačka uteha (1999)

Ja jesam odavde (trans. I Am from Here) is the first and the only album performed live by former Yugoslav and Serbian rock band Galija. The album was recorded on Galija concert held on March 8, 1998 in Čair Sports Center, Niš.

Ja jesam odavde is one of two Galija albums (the other one being the 1999 studio album Južnjačka uteha) recorded without their vocalist, Predrag Milosavljević.

== Track listing ==
1. "Da me nisi" – 3:49
2. "Žena koje nema" – 4:25
3. "Skadarska" – 3:37
4. "Milica" – 5:49
5. "Pismo" – 4:40
6. "Decimen" – 11:32
7. "Gospa" – 5:08
8. "Ja nisam odavde" – 6:05
9. "Noć" – 5:06
10. "Stare trube" – 5:43
11. "Dodirni me" – 6:47
12. "Kotor" – 6:07
13. "Još uvek sanjam" – 6:58

== Personnel ==
- Nenad Milosavljević - vocals, acoustic guitar, harmonica
- Saša Ranđelović - guitar
- Saša Lokner - keyboard
- Slaviša Pavlović - bass guitar
- Boban Pavlović - drums
- Dragutin Jakovljević - guitar

=== Guest musicians ===
- Gordana Svilarević - backing vocals
- Ivana Ćosić - backing vocals
