= Vukas =

Vukas is a surname. Notable people with the name include:

- Bernard Vukas (1927–1983), Yugoslav footballer
- Hari Vukas (born 1972), Croatian football manager and footballer
- Ivan Vukas (born 1979), Croatian handball player
- Mirjana Vukas
- Saša Vukas (born 1976), Croatian basketball player
- Budislav Vukas (born 1938), Croatian jurist

== See also ==
- Vuka (disambiguation)
- Vukašin
