= Dobro jutro, to sam ja =

Studio album by Galija
- Released: 2005
- Recorded: Digital Music Studio, Belgrade
- Genres: Rock; Folk rock
- Length: 60:53
- Label: PGP-RTS
- Producers: Dragutin Jakovljević; Nenad Milosavljević

Galija chronology
Južnjačka uteha (1999)	Dobro jutro, to sam ja (2005)	Oženiše me muzikom (2009)

Professional ratings
Review scores
Source	Rating
Barikada	5/10 stars

Dobro jutro, to sam ja (trans. Good Morning, It's Me) is the thirteenth studio album from Serbian and former Yugoslav rock band Galija, released in 2005.

== Track listing ==
All the songs were written by Nenad Milosavljević (music) and Predrag Milosavljević (lyrics).

1. "Čujem te kako lepo dišeš" – 5:58
2. "Ona je moja" – 5:35
3. "Ti možeš sve" – 5:33
4. "To nisi ti" – 3:49
5. "Možda sam lud" – 6:15
6. "Promenilo se sve" – 4:47
7. "Kaži mi" – 5:30
8. "Vera" – 6:26

=== Single tracks ===
9. "Tvoj heroj ostaće mlad" – 5:46
10. "Prava reč je dovoljna" – 5:49

== Personnel ==
- Nenad Milosavljević - vocals
- Predrag Milosavljević - vocals
- Dragutin Jakovljević - guitar
- Slaviša Pavlović - bass guitar

=== Guest musicians ===
- Laza Ristovski - keyboards
- Jan Vrba - keyboards
- Aleksandra Kovač - backing vocals
- Kristina Kovač - backing vocals
