= Trinaest =

Studio album by Galija
- Released: 1996
- Genre: Rock; Folk rock
- Length: 37:34
- Label: PGP-RTS

Galija chronology
Karavan (1994)	Trinaest (1996)	Večita plovidba (1997)

Trinaest (trans. Thirteen) is the tenth studio album from Serbian and former Yugoslav rock band Galija.

Besides the lyrics written by the band member Predrag Milosavljević, songs feature lyrics written by poets Branko Radičević, Stevan Raičković and Petar Pajić.

== Track listing ==
1. "Imali smo krila" – 4:30
2. "Ona zna sve" – 2:42
3. "Uzalud" – 4:21
4. "Balada o očevima" – 5:07
5. "Sviraj" – 3:39
6. "Srbija" – 2:30
7. "Poljubi me" – 3:51
8. "Kada prestane sve" – 3:50
9. "Ona još ne zna" – 3:53
10. "Cvetom do nje" – 3:11

== Personnel ==
- Nenad Milosavljević - vocals, acoustic guitar, harmonica
- Predrag Milosavljević - vocals
- Dragutin Jakovljević - guitar
- Oliver Jezdić - keyboards
- Branislav Milošević - bass guitar
- Boban Pavlović - drums
