= Vuca =

Vuča may refer to:

- General Vuča, a figure in Serbian epic poetry
- Vuča Žikić (died 1808), Serbian revolutionary
- Vuca, Berane Municipality, a village in Montenegro
- Vuca, Rožaje, a village in Montenegro

VUCA may refer to:

- Court of appeal of Vanuatu
- Volatility, uncertainty, complexity and ambiguity

== See also ==
- Vuka (disambiguation)
