= Voleti voleti =

Studio album by Galija
- Released: 1997
- Recorded: Summer 1997
- Studio: Studio Pink Studio O
- Genre: Rock; Folk rock
- Length: 45:30
- Label: PGP-RTS
- Producer: Ivan Vlatković

Galija chronology
Večita plovidba (1997)	Voleti voleti (1997)	Ja jesam odavde (1998)

Voleti voleti (trans: To Love to Love) is the eleventh studio album from Serbian and former Yugoslav rock band Galija.

== Track listing ==
All the songs were written by Nenad Milosavljević (music) and Slobodan Kostadinović (lyrics).

1. "Pege" – 4:17
2. "Kaća" – 4:00
3. "Pismo" – 4:55
4. "Bluz za Velikog Majstora" – 4:23
5. "Milica" – 5:55
6. "Kotor" – 3:49
7. "Ko bi drugi" – 3:50
8. "Beg" – 5:13
9. "Niš" – 3:31
10. "Jabukovac" – 5:42

== Personnel ==
- Nenad Milosavljević - vocals, acoustic guitar, harmonica
- Predrag Milosavljević - vocals
- Dragutin Jakovljević - guitar
- Oliver Jezdić - keyboards
- Branislav Milošević - bass guitar
- Boban Pavlović - drums
