= Istorija, ti i ja =

Studio album by Galija
- Released: 1991
- Recorded: February 1991
- Studio: Radio Television of Montenegro Studio, Titograd
- Genre: Rock; art rock; blues rock; folk rock
- Length: 40:40
- Label: PGP-RTB
- Producer: Nikša Bratoš

Galija chronology
Još uvek sanjam (Najveći hitovi) (1990)	Istorija, ti i ja (1991)	Ni rat ni mir (Odlomci iz trilogije) (1991)

Istorija, ti i ja (trans. History, You and Me) is the eighth studio album from Serbian and Yugoslav rock band Galija. It is the third and the final part of the band's album trilogy comprising Daleko je Sunce (1988), Korak do slobode (1989) and Istorija, ti i ja.

== Background and concept ==
In 1987, on the idea of the band's new collaborator, lyricist Radoman Kanjevac, Galija started working on the album trilogy which would deal with their home country caught in contemporary political, economical and social turmoil. The first two parts of the trilogy, Daleko je Sunce (Distant Is the Sun, 1988) and Korak do slobode (One Step to Freedom, 1989), brought to the band—whose mid-1980s switch from their original progressive rock style towards more mainstream-oriented sound had initially not seen the expected success—new attention of the country's media and of the younger audience. With a new member, academically educated multi-instrumentalist Bratislav "Bata" Zlatković starting to share the role of the band's principal composer with the group's frontman and leader Nenad Milosavljević, and Kanjevac replacing the second vocalist Predrag Milosavljević as the principal lyricist, the two albums scored several hits, also sparking controversy with some of their politically-related lyrics.

Following the second part of the trilogy, Galija released the greatest hits compilation Još uvek sanjam (Najveći hitovi) (I'm Still Dreaming (Greatest Hits)), with several of their pre-1988 hits re-recorded for the album. After the compilation release, at the time of the first multi-party elections in Yugoslavia, the group started preparing an EP with four songs: "On je isti kao on" ("He Is just like Him"), "Ti si moja jedina partija" ("You Are My Only Party"), "Posle svega" ("After Everything") and "Komunista" ("Communist"), the latter featuring Romani singer Šaban Bajramović on vocals. The EP should have featured provocative lyrics dealing with the uncertain future of the country–with "On je isti kao on" ironically comparing President of Serbia Slobodan Milošević to former President of Yugoslavia Josip Broz Tito–and, due to political censorship, ended up unreleased, so the band focused on their following studio album.

Although Kanjevac had already replaced Predrag Milosavljević as the band's principal lyricist, Istorija, ti i ja was the band's only album with all lyrics authored by Kanjevac, without Predrag Milosavljević making any contributions to songs lyrics. The album was recorded during February 1991 in Radio Television of Montenegro studio in Titograd. It was produced by multi-instrumentalist and Crvena Jabuka member Nikša Bratoš and featured guest appearances by the band's former keyboardist Saša Lokner, bass guitarist Slaviša Pavlović "Stenli", flutist Bora Dugić and the early music ensemble Renesans.

Istorija, ti i ja was the band's fourth and last studio album recorded with guitar player Jean Jacques Roskam. Soon after the album release, due to growing tensions in the country, the Belgian-born guitarist left the band, moving to his wife's hometown Vrgorac in Dalmatia. Dragutin Jakovljević "Guta" joined the band as the replacement for Roskam.

== Track listing ==
All lyrics are written by Radoman Kanjevac.

Side A
No.	Title	Music	Length
1.	"Trava" ("Grass")	Nenad Milosavljević	2:50
2.	"Proleće" ("Spring")	Jean Jacques Roskam	3:35
3.	"Trube" ("Trumpets")	Nenad Milosavljević	3:30
4.	"Pod noktima" ("Under Your Nails")	Bratislav Zlatković	2:50
5.	"Da me nisi" ("If You Haven't")	Nenad Milosavljević	3:50
6.	"Godina" ("Year")	Bratislav Zlatković	3:20

Side B
No.	Title	Music	Length
1.	"Skadarska" ("Skadarska Street")	Bratislav Zlatković	4:20
2.	"Seti se maja" ("Remember May")	Nenad Milosavljević	3:35
3.	"Posle vatre" ("After the Fire")	Bratislav Zlatković	3:15
4.	"Moskva – Balkan" ("Moscow – Balkans")	Nenad Milosavljević; Bratislav Zlatković; Jean Jacques Roskam	3:25
5.	"Kao boja tvoga oka" ("Like the Color of Your Eye")	Bratislav Zlatković	5:30

== Personnel ==
- Nenad Milosavljević - vocals, harmonica, arranged by
- Predrag Milosavljević - vocals
- Jean Jacques Roscam - guitar, arranged by
- Bratislav Zlatković - keyboards, flute, guitar, arranged by
- Predrag Milanović - bass guitar
- Boban Pavlović - drums

=== Additional personnel ===
- Saša Lokner - keyboards
- Slaviša Pavlović - bass guitar
- Bora Dugić - flute (on track A1)
- Ensemble Renesans (on track B3)
- Nikša Bratoš - producer, arranged by
- Bobo Stanišić - recorded by
- Zorica Lakić - design

== Reception ==
Istorija, ti i ja brought some of the band's biggest hits: "Skadarska", "Trube", "Da me nisi", "Trava" and "Seti se maja".
