= Radio Sarajevo 202 =

- Bosnia and Herzegovina

Programming
- Languages: Bosnian, Croatian and Serbian
- Affiliations: BHT 1 and BH Radio 1

Ownership
- Owner: BHRT

History
- First air date: 1 July 1971

Radio Sarajevo 202 was a Bosnian national public radio channel operated by Radio and Television of Federation of Bosnia and Herzegovina (RTVFBiH).

It was established in 1971 by the former Radio Sarajevo, part of the larger Yugoslav Radio and Television network. It later suspended its operations in the 1990s largely due to its downsizing because of the war and resumed full-time operations in 2002. It subsequently shut down on 1 January 2010 due to lack of funds.

== History ==
Radio Sarajevo 202 started broadcasting on 1 July 1971. Historically, it was meant to be a "springboard for young and talented journalists". Slobodan Boban Minić began his career here. In general terms, the new station had an informative, service, cultural, sports and entertainment character. In 1974, Slobodan Boban Minić became the director of the station's Sports and Entertainment unit.

During the Bosnian War, the station had its frequencies suspended as BHRT preferred to transmit only one television channel and only one radio station. Following the Restructuring Act, PBSBiH revived the station in the early 2000s.

On 9 December 2009, a debate was held following the announcement of its impending closure, scheduled for 1 January 2010. In a public statement, the radio's staff condemned the decision as "a concrete and open slap in the face to all citizens of Sarajevo and Bosnia and Herzegovina", arguing that it destroyed a symbol of the city. The closure sparked strong public outcry, with former employees and citizen groups expressing outrage that a decades-old institution was being eliminated "because the law says so".
