= Druga plovidba =

Studio album by Galija
- Released: 1980
- Genre: Progressive rock; symphonic rock
- Length: 33:10
- Label: PGP-RTB
- Producer: Zlatko Manojlović

Galija chronology
Prva plovidba (1979)	Druga plovidba (1980)	Ipak verujem u sebe (1982)

Druga plovidba (trans. The Second Sail) is the second studio album from Serbian and Yugoslav rock band Galija, released in 1980.

== Background ==
Following the release of their 1979 debut album Prva plovidba (The First Sail), to mixed reactions of the critics and moderate commercial success, the band released their second album Druga plovidba in 1980. The album was produced by Zlatko Manojlović, at the time leader of the heavy metal band Gordi. Although Predrag Milosavljević, brother of the band's frontman and leader Nenad Milosavljević, wrote part of the lyrics for Prva plovidba and appeared on the album as guest vocalist, Druga plovidba was the group's first album to feature him as an official member. All the music was composed by Nenad Milosavljević, and all the lyrics were written by Predrag Milosavljević, with the exception of the song "U suton" ("At Twilight"), which was composed on a poem by renowned poet Dobriša Cesarić. Druga plovidba is the band's first album recorded with long-time bass guitarist Zoran "Čupa" Radosavljević, and the band's only album recorded with guitarist Dušan Radivojević and keyboardist Nebojša Marković.

== Track listing ==
All music is composed by Nenad Milosavljević; all lyrics are written by Predrag Milosavljević, except where noted.

Side A
No.	Title	Length
1.	"Oni bi baš hteli da ja stanem" ("They Would Really Like Me to Stop")	3:54
2.	"Moj deda je bio roker" ("My Grandfather Was a Rocker")	4:18
3.	"Bilo je to jednom" ("It Happened Once")	6:22
4.	"Zar baš moram nešto mudro da kažem" ("Do I Really Have to Say Something Wise")	3:12

Side B
No.	Title	Lyrics	Length
1.	"Nije ti otac kriv" ("It's Not Your Fathers Fault")		3:54
2.	"Neka bude sve tebi u čast" ("May All Be in Your Honor")		4:49
3.	"U suton" ("At Twilight")	Dobriša Cesarić	5:30

== Personnel ==
- Nenad Milosavljević - vocals, acoustic guitar, harmonica
- Predrag Milosavljević - vocals
- Dušan Radivojević - guitar
- Zoran Radosavljević - bass guitar
- Nebojša Marković - keyboards
- Boban Pavlović - drums

=== Additional personnel ===
- Zlatko Manojlović - producer
- Dragan Vukićević - engineer
- Ivan Ćulum - design
