= Južnjačka uteha =

Studio album by Galija
- Released: 1999
- Genre: Folk rock
- Length: 45:30
- Label: PGP-RTS
- Producer: Ivan Vlatković

Galija chronology
Ja jesam odavde (1998)	Južnjačka uteha (1999)	Dobro jutro, to sam ja (2005)

Južnjača uteha (trans. Southern Comfort) is the twelfth studio album from Serbian and former Yugoslav rock band Galija, released in 1999. The album features covers of Serbian traditional songs. The only song which is not a cover is the song "Uteha", written by Nenad Milosavljević and Dragutin Jakovljević.

Južnjačka uteha is one of two Galija albums (the other one being the 1998 live album Ja jesam odavde) recorded without vocalist Predrag Milosavljević.

== Track listing ==
1. "Kaži kaži libe Stano" – 5:32
2. "Tikve" – 4:26
3. "Da znaješ mori mome" – 4:55
4. "Dimitrijo" – 5:18
5. "Uteha" – 5:02
6. "Igra kolo na livadi" – 5:34
7. "Smiljana" – 5:03
8. "Snošti si minav mamo" – 4:34
9. "Kalčina kafana" – 5:30

== Personnel ==
- Nenad Milosavljević - vocals, acoustic guitar, harmonica
- Saša Ranđelović - guitar
- Dragutin Jakovljević - guitar, synth guitar
- Saša Lokner - keyboards
- Slaviša Pavlović - bass guitar
- Boban Pavlović - drums

=== Guest musicians ===
- Marijana Popović - backing vocals (on "Tikve")
