= Karavan (album) =

Studio album by Galija
- Released: 1994
- Genres: Rock; Folk rock
- Length: 70:11
- Label: PGP-RTS
- Producer: Saša Habić

Galija chronology
Ni rat ni mir (Odlomci iz trilogije) (1991)	Karavan (1994)	Trinaest (1996)

Professional ratings
Review scores
Source	Rating
Branimir Lokner - Kritičko pakovanje	(mixed)

Karavan (trans. Caravan) is the ninth studio album from Serbian and former Yugoslav rock band Galija. Karavan is the last album that was recorded in cooperation with the lyricist Radoman Kanjevac.

In 2021 the album was polled 87th on the list of 100 best Serbian rock albums published after the breakup of SFR Yugoslavia. The list was published in the book Kako (ni)je propao rokenrol u Srbiji (How Rock 'n' Roll in Serbia (Didn't) Came to an End).

== Track listing ==
1. "Petlovi" (Traditional) – 2:45
2. "Ja sam sam" (N. Milosavljević, R. Kanjevac, P. Milosavljević) – 3:47
3. "Dodirni me" (N. Milosavljević, O. Jezdić, P. Milosavljević) – 3:42
4. "Ne mogu da tebe ne poželim" (N. Milosavljević, R. Kanjevac) – 3:55
5. "Ja nisam odavde" (N. Milosavljević, R. Kanjevac, P. Milosavljević) - 4:38
6. "Pevajmo" (N. Milosavljević, R. Kanjevac) – 3:05
7. "Život je lep" (N. Milosavljević, R. Kanjevac) – 3:22
8. "Nedelja" (N. Milosavljević, R. Kanjevac, O. Jezdić) – 3:36
9. "Mlada, lepa i pametna" (N. Milosavljević, B. Milošević, R. Kanjevac) – 4:41
10. "Karavan" (N. Milosavljević, B. Zlatković, P. Milosavljević, R. Kanjevac) – 3:30
11. "Narode moj" (N. Milosavljević, P. Milosavljević, R. Kanjevac) – 4:16
12. "Moj brat i ja" (N. Milosavljević, P. Milosavljević, R. Kanjevac) – 4:48
13. "Otkad te nema" (N. Milosavljević, R. Kanjevac) – 3:40
14. "Ne idi" (N. Milosavljević, P. Milosavljević) – 3:49
15. "Okreni Beograd" (N. Milosavljević, R. Kanjevac) – 2:31
16. "Veruj mi" (N. Milosavljević, R. Kanjevac) – 3:00
17. "Uzalud se trudiš" (N. Milosavljević, P. Milosavljević, R. Kanjevac) – 3:30
18. "Šta ću ti sad" (N. Milosavljević, R. Kanjevac) – 2:46

== Personnel ==
- Nenad Milosavljević - vocals, acoustic guitar, harmonica
- Predrag Milosavljević - vocals
- Dragutin Jakovljević - guitar
- Oliver Jezdić - keyboards, programming
- Branislav Milošević - bass guitar
- Boban Pavlović - drums

=== Guest musicians ===
- Dragan Jovanović - acoustic guitar

== Legacy ==
In 2021 the album was polled 87th on the list of 100 best Serbian rock albums published after the breakup of SFR Yugoslavia. The list was published in the book Kako (ni)je propao rokenrol u Srbiji (How Rock 'n' Roll in Serbia (Didn't) Came to an End).
