= Jozo Penava =

Bosnia and Herzegovina musician

- Born: 26 May 1909; Palež, Condominium of Bosnia and Herzegovina, Austria-Hungary
- Died: 17 January 1987 (aged 77); Sarajevo, SR Bosnia and Herzegovina, SFR Yugoslavia
- Years active: 1939–1987
- Musical career
- Genres: sevdalinka; Bosnian folk
- Instruments: tambura; vocals
- Labels: Jugoton; Diskos

Jozo Penava (26 May 1909 – 17 January 1987) was a Bosnian-Herzegovinian music producer, composer, arranger, musician and vocalist. Penava immensely contributed to the development of folk songs and the traditional Bosniak folk music sevdalinka. He worked with many prominent sevdalinka singers of the 20th century, such as Safet Isović, Zehra Deović, Himzo Polovina, Nada Mamula, Beba Selimović, Nedžad Salković, Silvana Armenulić, and Meho Puzić, among others.

== Biography ==
Penava was born in the village of Palež near Kiseljak, in what is today Bosnia and Herzegovina. As a young man he studied to become a baker. Penava was in love with the craft of baking, but was never attracted to getting up early and working in high temperature kitchens. His passion for music was stronger. After serving his military service in Sombor in 1939, Penava composed his first songs: "Sa prozora" (From the Window) and "U baštici, kraj bijele ružice" (In a Small Garden, by the White Roses). He enrolled in a music school where he gained musical knowledge. Penava was one of the founders of Radio Sarajevo in April 1945 after World War II. Penava led the tambura orchestra of Radio Sarajevo for more than twenty years.

== Songs ==
- "Bere cura plav jorgovan"
- "Sve behara i sve cvjeta"
- "Sjetuje me majka"
- "Cvati ružo moja"
- "Sarajevo, behara ti tvoga"
- "Gledala sam sa prozora"
- "Na mezaru majka plače i nišane ljubi"
- "Golube poleti"
- "Pokraj kuće male"
- "Sarajčice hajdemo"
- "Pjesma Kiseljaku"
- "Ismihana dušo moja"
- "Mene moja zaklinjala majka"
