= Daleko je Sunce =

Studio album by Galija
- Released: 1988
- Recorded: Winter 1987–1988
- Studio: Ša-Na-Na
- Genre: Rock; art rock; folk rock; pop rock
- Length: 39:44
- Label: PGP-RTB
- Producer: Dušan Petrović

Galija chronology
Digni ruku (1986)	Daleko je Sunce (1988)	Korak do slobode (1989)

Daleko je Sunce (trans. Distant Is the Sun) is the sixth studio album from Serbian and Yugoslav rock band Galija, released in 1988. It is the first album in the band's album trilogy, comprising Daleko je Sunce, Korak do slobode (1989) and Istorija, ti i ja (1991).

== Background and concept ==
Following the release of the 1986 album Digni ruku (Raise Your Hand), the band was joined by a new member, Bratislav "Bata" Zlatković, a graduate from Sarajevo Music Academy and multi-instrumentalist, who took on the role of the band's keyboardist, flutist and second guitarist. Up to that point, Galija's principal composer was the band's frontman and leader Nenad Milosavljević, with only Digni ruku offering more space to compositions by guitarist Jean Jacques Roskam. With Zlatković's arrival, the songwriting duties were shared among himself, Milosavljević and Roskam. Simultaneously, the band started to collaborate with lyricist Radoman Kanjevac, who would soon replace the group's second vocalist Predrag Milosavljević as the band's principla lyricist. Despite the fact that Zlatković and Kanjevac had never before worked with a professional rock band–prior to Galija, Zlatković's had little experience in rock music, and Kanjevac, at the time a journalist for Radio Belgrade, had never written song lyrics–the two brought fresh ideas to the group's work. Kanjevac brought up an idea of releasing an album trilogy which would deal with contemporary political turmoil in Yugoslavia, and Zlatković introduced folk music influences into the band's sound.

The songs for Daleko je Sunce were written in Makarska seaside resort (where the band had held regular summer performances since 1980) during the summer of 1987. The album was recorded during the winter of 1987–1988. The album was produced by Dušan "Šane" Petrović, and featured numerous guest appearances, including keyboardists Saša Lokner (of Bajaga i Instruktori) and Kornelije Kovač, bass guitarists Rade Bulatović (of Jakarta) and Nenad Stefanović "Japanac", drummer Ivan Vdović "Vd" and Fejat Sejdić Trumpet Orchestra. The album was titled after a novel by renowned writer Dobrica Ćosić, and the songs were titled after the works of Dobrica Ćosić, Branko Ćopić, Ivo Andrić, Laza Lazarević and Aleksa Šantić. The songs featured multi-layered lyrics, dealing with political topics through form of love songs. The spoken intro to "Žena koje nema" ("A Woman That Is Not There") features the last line from Ćosić's Distant Is the Sun red by three different actors, Branislav "Ciga" Jerinić, Miloš Žutić and Mihajlo Viktorović. The song "Zebre i bizoni" ("Zebras and Buffalos") featured provocative lyrics dealing with Josip Broz Tito's residence at Brijuni. On the insistent of the record label, "Zebre i bizoni" lyrics were omitted from the inner sleeve. The track "Orlovi rano leto" ("Eagles Start Flying Early") includes a verse from the poem "Wait for Me" by Russian poet Konstantin Simonov, and the song "Mi znamo sudbu" ("We Know Our Destiny") includes motifs from the lyrics of Serbian World War I song "Tamo daleko" ("There, Far Away").

Daleko je sunce was the band's fifth and last album recorded with long-time bass guitarist Zoran "Čupa" Radosavljević. After the album release, he left the band, and was replaced by Predrag Milanović.

== Album cover ==
The album cover was designed by Slobodan Kaštavarac and features a photograph of sunset at Mount Athos, Greece, taken by Danko Đurić. The back cover features Đurić's photograph of sky taken from inside the walls of Hilandar Monastery.

== Track listing ==
Side A
No.	Title	Lyrics	Music	Length
1.	"Da li si spavala" ("Did You Sleep")	Radoman Kanjevac	Bratislav Zlatković	3:09
2.	"Žena koje nema" ("A Woman That Is Not There")	Predrag Milosavljević	Nenad Milosavljević; Jean Jacques Roskam	4:11
3.	"Bez naslova" ("Untitled")	Radoman Kanjevac	Nenad Milosavljević	3:33
4.	"Zebre i Bizoni" ("Zebras and Buffalos")	Radoman Kanjevac	Nenad Milosavljević	2:59
5.	"Orlovi rano lete" ("Eagles Start Flying Early")	Radoman Kanjevac	Nenad Milosavljević	5:14

Side B
No.	Title	Lyrics	Music	Length
1.	"Intimni odnosi" ("Intimate Relationship")	Radoman Kanjevac	Bratislav Zlatković	2:59
2.	"Švabica" ("German Girl")	Radoman Kanjevac	Bratislav Zlatković	2:25
3.	"Će me voliš" ("You're Gonna Love Me")	Predrag Milosavljević	Nenad Milosavljević; Bratislav Zlatković	2:30
4.	"Nebo nad Makarskom" ("Sky over Makarska")	Predrag Milosavljević	Jean Jacques Roskam	3:48
5.	"Mi znamo sudbu" ("We Know Our Destiny")	Radoman Kanjevac; Bratislav Zlatković	Bratislav Zlatković	3:26
6.	"Kao i obično" ("Like Usual")	Radoman Kanjevac	Nenad Milosavljević; Bratislav Zlatković	4:02

== Personnel ==
- Nenad Milosavljević - vocals
- Predrag Milosavljević - vocals
- Jean Jacques Roscam - guitar
- Bratislav Zlatković - keyboards, flute, guitar
- Zoran Radosavljević - bass guitar
- Boban Pavlović - drums

=== Additional personnel ===
- Kornelije Kovač - keyboards
- Saša Lokner - keyboards
- Ivan Vdović - drums
- Nenad Stefanović "Japanac" - bass guitar
- Rade Bulatović - bass guitar
- Fejat Sejdić Trumpet Orchestra
- Dušan Petrović - producer, arranged by
- Radoman Kanjevac - recorded by
- Slobodan Kaštavarac - design
- Danko Đurić - photography

== Reception and censorship ==
Daleko je Sunce was a commercial success, bringing to the band new attention of the media and of the younger audience. The album's biggest hits were the ballad "Da li si spavala" and folk-oriented "Mi znamo sudbu", both co-written by Zlatković and Kanjevac. Minor hits included "Intimni odnosi", "Orlovi rano lete" and "Kao i obično".

Due to lyrics perceived as politically provocative, the editors of Radio Belgrade and Radio Zagreb marked two songs from Daleko je sunce as unsuitable for broadcasting, while the editors of Radio Sarajevo decided not to broadcast four songs from the album. Commenting on censorship in an interview following the album release, Nenad Milosavljević stated:

I perceive all the songs from the album as love songs. People listen to songs superficially, and as a result misinterpret them as political – due to couple of words [from the lyrics]! The ones who get the real message are welcome – even if there isn't a lot of them.

Kanjevac commented in an interview:

I'm not surprised that the songs have to fight obstacles. The fact is that there is a healthy dose of provocation in the whole concept. There are laws and institutions in our society, and they can protect the order much better than editors of some entertainment shows and channels. It is very important to say that this record is a record for the people, and not an attempt to offer some intellectual observations and intellectual masturbation. Just as any other record, it has two layers. The folk's and the author's. The sun is not a symbol of communism, but of love and happiness! What they have in common is that all the songs are about expecting something that won't come – just as in anybody's life.

One part of Yugoslav public perceived the song "Mi znamo sudbu", featuring a Balkan brass band and motifs from Serbian World War I patriotic song "Tamo daleko", as nationalistic. In an interview following the album release, Kanjevac commented:

I have no interest in Serbs as a category. I am really sorry that some people interpreted the verse "We're flying to heaven" [from "Mi znamo sudbu"] as pro-Serbian; why wouldn't it be a verse about Gypsies flying to heaven? I feel more love for my friend from Zagreb then for a maniac that sprays "Delije" over walls, or for a Serbian tram driver who won't let me in at a tram stop. I don't believe that the future or the essence belongs to anyone: Serbs, Croats, Slovenes, Albanians, however... Orthodoxy naturally springs out from my lyrics [for the song].
