= Saša Vukas =

Croatian basketball player

retired player
- Position: Power forward

Personal information
- Born: September 27, 1976 (age 50) Rijeka, SR Croatia, SFR Yugoslavia
- Listed height: 2.05 m (6 ft 9 in)

Career information
- Playing career: 2000–present

Career history
- 2000–2004: Vojvodina
- 2004–2005: Rabotnički
- 2005: AZS Koszalin
- 2005–2006: Alimos B.C.
- 2007–2008: U-Mobitelco Cluj-Napoca
- 2008: Musson Symferopil
- 2008–2009: Tractorsazi Kordestan

Saša Vukas (born September 27, 1976) is a former Croatian professional basketball player.
