= Zehra Deović =

Bosnian sevdalinka-folk singer (1938–2015)

- Deović in 1962

Background information
- Born: 9 December 1938; Foča, Kingdom of Yugoslavia
- Died: 30 October 2015 (aged 76); Sarajevo, Bosnia and Herzegovina
- Occupation: singer
- Years active: 1960–2015
- Musical career
- Genres: Bosnian folk; sevdalinka
- Instrument: vocals
- Labels: Jugoton; PGP RTB; Beograd Disk

Zehra Deović (9 December 1938 – 30 October 2015) was a Bosnian sevdalinka-folk singer and was one of the leading female singers of the 1960s and 1970s in Yugoslavia, along with Silvana Armenulić, Nada Mamula and Beba Selimović.

Deović started working at Radio Sarajevo in 1960 and released her first album two years later. She lived and worked in Sarajevo until her death.

== Biography ==
Deović was born in Foča, Kingdom of Yugoslavia (modern-day Bosnia and Herzegovina), to Bosniak parents Halim and Abida Deović. Her father was killed in 1941 and she relocated as a World War II refugee to Sarajevo in 1943 with her mom and two siblings. After three years, they returned to Foča.

As a child, Deović joined Foča's youth cultural club "Jedinstvo" (Unity) and first began performing with them in major cities of Yugoslavia in 1953. During these tours she had the chance to perform alongside the famous folk singers of the time, such as Vuka Šeherović. In 1960, she moved back to Sarajevo for schooling and auditioned for Radio Sarajevo with the folk song "Dvije su se vode zavadile". She passed and was given a recording contract with the Zagreb-based label Jugoton. Deović released her debut studio album Pjesme iz Bosne on 11 December 1962. Through her career she was a frequent participant in the annual music festival in Ilidža, in addition to multiple other music festivals in the region.

Her last public appearance was on March 1, 2015 when she appeared on the BHRT show dedicated to singer Safet Isović to whom she dedicated her song.

Deović died at age 76 after a long illness on 30 October 2015 in Sarajevo.

== Discography ==
=== Extended plays ===
- Pjesme iz Bosne (1962)
- Oj Igmane (1963)
- Ja prošetah čaršijom (1963)
- Oj, Prijedore pun si mi sevdaha / Pšeničice sitno zrno (1963)
- Izmamilo sunce (1964)
- Ne znam šta ću majko (1966)
- Ni Bajrami više nisu (1968)
- Voljela sam (1971)
- Rodni grade / Čekanje (1971)
- Zovem te ljubavi (1973)

=== Studio albums ===
- Dvije su se vode zavadile (1976)
- Zehrin sevdah (1982)
- Kad procvatu (1990)
