= Digni ruku =

Studio album by Galija
- Released: 1986
- Recorded: May – June 1986
- Studio: Oliver Studio, Belgrade
- Genre: Rock; art rock; power pop
- Length: 39:44
- Label: PGP-RTB
- Producer: Nenad Stefanović

Galija chronology
Bez naglih skokova (1984)	Digni ruku (1986)	Daleko je Sunce (1988)

Digni ruku (trans. Raise Your Hand) is the fifth studio album from Serbian and Yugoslav rock band Galija, released in 1986.

== Background and recording ==
Following the release of Galija's fourth studio album Bez naglih skokova (Without Sudden Jumps) in 1984, which marked their shift from progressive rock towards more mainstream-oriented rock sound, the group's keyboardist Saša Lokner moved to Bajaga i Instruktori and was replaced by Aleksandar Ralev; Bez naglih skokova would be the group's only album recorded with Ralev, who would be replaced by multi-instrumentalist Bratislav "Bata" Zlatković. Prior to Bez naglih skokova recording, Galija was also joined by the second guitarist Jean Jacques Roskam. Roskam, a Belgian of Zaire origin, was previously a member of the Belgian progressive rock band Machiavel and Yugoslav pop rock bands D' Boys and Peđa D' Boy Band. The new lineup recorded the album Digni ruku, with–as on the band's previous albums–most of the music composed by Galija frontman Nenad Milosavljević and most of the lyrics written by the second vocalist Predrag Milosavljević. Three songs were composed by Roskam, including the English language song "Winter's Coming", which featured lyrics written by Dani Klein, frontress of the Belgian group Vaya Con Dios, and music for one song was co-written by Roskam and Nenad Milosavljević. The album also included the instrumental track "Možda spava" ("Maybe She's Asleep"), composed by Nenad Milosavljević. The album was produced by Nenad Stefanović "Japanac", and featured guest appearances by Saša Lokner (keyboards), Goran Grbić (trumpet), Nenad Petrović (saxophone) and Bobana Stojković (backing vocals). Digni ruku was the band's third and final album recorded with guitarist Branislav Radulović, who left the group soon after the album release, leaving Roskam as the band's only guitar player.

The album brought first political controversies in the band's career. The refrain of the title track–which would become a hit–included the verse "Nemaš kartu ni do Prištine" ("You can't even afford a ticket to Priština"), perceived as politically provocative in the time of tensions in SAP Kosovo. The band wanted the album cover to feature a provocative image of the Hero of Socialist Labour Alija Sirotanović with a blindfold, which the PGP-RTB record label refused.

== Track listing ==
Side A
No.	Title	Lyrics	Music	Length
1.	"Digni ruku" ("Raise Your Hand")	Predrag Milosavljević	Nenad Milosavljević	3:26
2.	"Na tvojoj strani kreveta" ("On Your Side of the Bed")	Predrag Milosavljević	Nenad Milosavljević	4:34
3.	"Hodnici sećanja" ("Corridors of Memories")	Predrag Milosavljević	Nenad Milosavljević	4:37
4.	"Bubanj i bas" ("Drum and Bass")	Predrag Milosavljević	Nenad Milosavljević	4:19
5.	"Ja i moj auto" ("Me and My Car")	Predrag Milosavljević	Jean Jacques Roskam	3:00

Side B
No.	Title	Lyrics	Music	Length
1.	"Winter's Coming"	Dani Klein	Jean Jacques Roskam	4:13
2.	"Trudim se" ("I'm Trying")	Predrag Milosavljević	Nenad Milosavljević; Jean Jacques Roskam	3:41
3.	"Šok" ("Shock")	Predrag Milosavljević	Jean Jacques Roskam	3:49
4.	"Svaki dan sa njom" ("Every Day With Her")	Predrag Milosavljević	Nenad Milosavljević	3:46
5.	"Možda Spava" ("Maybe She's Asleep")		Nenad Milosavljević	4:35

== Personnel ==
- Nenad Milosavljević - vocals
- Predrag Milosavljević - vocals
- Jean Jacques Roscam - guitar
- Branislav Radulović - guitar
- Zoran Radosavljević - bass guitar
- Boban Pavlović - drums

=== Additional personnel ===
- Goran Grbić - trumpet
- Nenad Petrović - saxophone
- Saša Lokner - keyboards
- Bobana Stojković - backing vocals
- Nenad Stefanović "Japanac" - producer, bass guitar
- Igor Borojević - recorded by
- Danilo Dačić - design, photography
