= Bez naglih skokova =

- The orange shoes version of the cover

Studio album by Galija
- Released: 1984
- Recorded: October 1983
- Studio: Strawberry Studios, Manchester
- Genre: Rock; art rock
- Length: 36:26
- Label: PGP-RTB
- Producer: Gordon Rowley

Galija chronology
Ipak verujem u sebe (1982)	Bez naglih skokova (1984)	Digni ruku (1986)

Bez naglih skokova (trans. Without Sudden Jumps) is the fourth studio album from Serbian and Yugoslav rock band Galija, released in 1984. The album marked the group's shift from progressive rock towards more mainstream rock sound.

== Background ==
In 1983, Galija travelled to Manchester to record their fourth studio album. The album was recorded in Manchester's Strawberry Studios and was produced by Gordon Rowley, bass guitarist of the British hard rock band Nightwing. Rowley had previously collaborated with another band from Galija's home city Niš, the hard rock band Kerber, producing their first two studio albums. Bez naglih skokova was mixed at Rudy Records Studio, Hollywood, California. The album marked the band's shift from progressive and symphonic rock towards more mainstream-oriented rock sound. The material was offered to Yugoslav biggest record label Jugoton, but the company did not show interest for the album, so the band once again signed with PGP-RTB. Bez naglih skokova was the band's only studio album recorded with keyboardist Saša Lokner, who came in from the jazz rock band Potop and would, soon after the album release, join the pop rock band Bajaga i Instruktori. Lokner debuted as songwriter on Bez naglih skokova, composing the song "Biću tu" ("I'll Be There"). All other songs were composed by the band's frontman and leader Nenad Milosavljević, and all the lyrics were written by the second vocalist Predrag Milosavljević, with the exception of the song "Ti me svojom hladnoćom ne kušaj" ("Do Not Tempt Me with Your Coldness"), composed on a poem by Russian poet Sergei Yesenin.

== Album cover ==
The album cover, designed by Aleksandar Dević, was released in two different versions, one featuring orange and the other featuring blue high-heeled shoes.

== Track listing ==
All music is composed by Nenad Milosavljević, and all lyrics are written by Predrag Milosavljević, except where noted.

Side A
No.	Title	Lyrics	Length
1.	"Tačno u 5 i 30" ("At 5:30 Exactly")		4:04
2.	"Ti me svojom hladnoćom ne kušaj" ("Do Not Tempt Me with Your Coldness")	Sergei Yesenin	4:18
3.	"Meksiko" ("Mexico")		4:51
4.	"San" ("A Dream")		5:03

Side B
No.	Title	Music	Length
1.	"Biću tu" ("I'll Be There")	Saša Lokner	3:00
2.	"Igraj kad si sam" ("Dance When You're Alone")		2:58
3.	"Bilo je dobro" ("It Was Good")		4:00
4.	"Jednom" ("Once")		5:07
5.	"Pesma" ("Song")		2:52

== Personnel ==
- Nenad Milosavljević - vocals, acoustic guitar, harmonica
- Predrag Milosavljević - vocals
- Branislav Radulović - guitar
- Zoran Radosavljević - bass guitar, tambourine
- Saša Lokner - keyboards
- Boban Pavlović - drums, percussion

=== Additional personnel ===
- Gordon Rowley - producer, recorded by
- Chris Jones - recording assistant
- Malcolm Davies - mastered by
- Aleksandar Dević - cover design

== Reception ==
Unlike the band's previous album Ipak verujem u sebe (Nevertheless, I Believe in Myself), which brought two hit ballads, Bez naglih skokova did not bring any hit songs.
