= Vuka Popadić =

Vuka Popadić (née Jovanović) was a Serbian heroine of World War I. She saved many lives, particularly those of women and children. She sheltered fifteen Austro-Hungarian soldiers and later established a bandage station where she saved several hundred Serbian soldiers.

== Biography ==
When the war first reached Serbia, particularly the city of Belgrade, areas of today's Dorcol and Savamala neighborhoods were destroyed. During the bombing, she was with her daughter Jelena and her sister, Jelena Lela Milutinovic, an actress at the National Theatre in Belgrade. Together with her sister, she refused to leave Belgrade. Despite the bombing, Popadić made her home a shelter for people who were afraid. According to tradition, Popadić went out of her apartment to see if any Austro-Hungarian soldiers were in the area. Upon finding a group seeking refuge from the Serbian army, she strictly ordered them to throw down their weapons and follow her to avoid being killed. At her home, she provided the prisoners with slatko and water. After the Serbian army regained control of Belgrade, she handed over the Austrian soldiers. She was thanked by the Serbian army commander, and the Austro-Hungarian soldiers expressed gratitude for their lives being saved. Popadić also opened a temporary shelter for wounded Serbian women, with help from her sister and daughter.

After the war ended, she married Živko Popadić, Treasurer of the Directorate of Tram and Lighting.
