= Mesto pored prozora =

Studio album by Galija
- Released: 2010
- Recorded: Studio V, PGP-RTS, Belgrade; September 2009 – July 2010
- Genre: Rock
- Length: 45:18
- Label: PGP-RTS

Galija chronology
Oženiše me muzikom (2009)	Mesto pored prozora (2010)

Professional ratings
Review scores
Source	Rating
Nocturne	8/10 stars

Mesto pored prozora (trans. A Seat by the Window) is the fourteenth studio album from Serbian rock band Galija, released in 2010.

== Background and recording ==
Predrag Milosavljević, the band's vocalist and author of the lyrics, stated that "a seat by the window" is a "spot which is a source of light and hope, a place where landscapes, cities and people pass by you, and a sign of love towards the one for whom you're keeping that seat."

The lyrics for the song "Što se bore misli moje" were inspired by the poem of the same name, written by Mihailo Obrenović III, Prince of Serbia.

The album was recorded in PGP-RTS' Studio V, in which Galija recorded their first two albums. Mesto prozora is also the last album recorded in the studio, as PGP-RTS closed it soon after the album recording.

== Track listing ==
All the songs written by Nenad Milosavljević (music) and Predrag Milosavljević (lyrics).

1. "Kako mi se sviđaš" – 4:07
2. "U napad" – 3:46
3. "Čuvam ti mesto pored prozora" – 4:50
4. "Više nisam tvoj" – 4:04
5. "Što se bore misli moje" – 5:00
6. "Zločin i kazna" – 4:55
7. "Meni si lepa" – 5:37
8. "Novembar - maj" – 4:15
9. "Kakav džez" – 3:31
10. "Ne tugujem ja" – 5:13

== Personnel ==
- Nenad Milosavljević - vocals, harmonica
- Predrag Milosavljević - vocals
- Dragutin Jakovljević - guitar, drum programming
- Boban Pavlović - drums
- Slaviša Pavlović - bass guitar (on tracks: 3, 4, 5, 6)
- Dejan Antović - bass guitar (on tracks: 1, 2, 7, 8, 9)
- Miloš Krstić - guitar
- Goran Antović - keyboards

=== Additional personnel ===
- Miša Blam - double bass (on track 10)
- Ivan Ilić - keyboards (on track 9)
- Gordana Svilarević - backing vocals (on tracks: 8, 10)
- Ljiljana Ranđelović - backing vocals (on track 10)
- Nemanja Banović - trumpet (on tracks: 6, 9)
- Strahinja Banović - trumpet (6, 9)
- Ljubiša Paunić - saxophone (on tracks: 6, 9)
- Ivan Ilić - trombone, brass arrangements (on tracks: 6, 9)
