= Ipak verujem u sebe =

Studio album by Galija
- Released: 1982
- Recorded: June–September 1982
- Studio: Plava Šupa Studio; Studio V PGP-RTB
- Genre: Progressive rock; symphonic rock; blues rock
- Length: 36:26
- Label: PGP-RTB
- Producer: Galija; Dragan Vukićević

Galija chronology
Druga plovidba (1980)	Ipak verujem u sebe (1982)	Bez naglih skokova (1984)

Ipak verujem u sebe (trans. Nevertheless, I Believe in Myself) is the third studio album from Serbian and Yugoslav rock band Galija, released in 1982.

== Background ==
Ipak verujem u sebe was Galija's first album with all the songs written by the group's frontman Nenad Milosavljević (music) and the second vocalist Predrag Milosavljević (lyrics). It was the band's first album to be recorded with guitarist Branislav Radulović, the last album recorded with keyboardist Dragan Miloradović, and the only album to feature drummer Ljubomir Mišić, the latter coming to the band as a temporary replacement for their mainstay drummer Boban Pavlović "Čarlton", who was at time serving his mandatory stint in the Yugoslav People's Army.

== Track listing ==
All music is composed by Nenad Milosavljević; all lyrics are written by Predrag Milosavljević.

Side A
No.	Title	Length
1.	"Još uvek sanjam" ("I'm Still Dreaming")	5:32
2.	"Svet kroz šareno staklo" ("World Seen through Colored Glass")	4:18
3.	"Školarci" ("Schoolboys")	4:20
4.	"Ja sam od onih" ("I'm One of Those")	5:03

Side B
No.	Title	Length
1.	"Vreme ti je za žene" ("It's Your Time for Women")	4:20
2.	"Burna pijana noć" ("Stormy Drunken Night")	4:45
3.	"Da li postoji put" ("Is There a Path")	7:47
4.	"Ipak verujem u sebe" ("Nevertheless, I Believe in Myself")	2:29

== Personnel ==
- Nenad Milosavljević - vocals, acoustic guitar, harmonica
- Predrag Milosavljević - vocals
- Branislav Radulović - guitar
- Zoran Radosavljević - bass guitar
- Dragan Miloradović - keyboards
- Ljubomir Mišić - drums

=== Additional personnel ===
- Dragan Vukićević - producer, engineer
- Slavoljub Stanković - cover design
- Ivan Zdravković - photography

== Reception ==
The album brought two major hits for the band, the ballads "Još uvek sanjam" ("I'm Still Dreaming") and "Burna pijana noć" ("Stormy Drunken Night").
