= Vuka Šeherović =

- Born: Vuka Šekerović; 1903; Zenica, Bosnia and Herzegovina, Austria-Hungary
- Died: 1976 (aged 72–73); Zenica, SR Bosnia and Herzegovina, SFR Yugoslavia
- Occupation: singer
- Years active: 1919–76
- Musical career
- Genres: Bosnian folk; sevdalinka
- Instrument: vocals
- Labels: Jugoton; PGP RTS

Vuka Šeherović (Serbo-Croatian Cyrillic: Вука Шехеровић; née Šekerović, Serbo-Croatian Cyrillic: Шекеровић; 1903–1976) was a Bosnian folk singer and sevdalinka interpreter. She was called the "woman with the silver voice."

== Biography ==
Šeherović was born with the surname Šekerović in the village Kovačići near Zenica in 1903. Her father Risto Šekerović was a prison guard at the Zenica prison. A young Vuka sang in her schools choir starting at age seven.

Her career began in 1919, aged 16, when she won a talent contest in Brčko. Šeherović later sang in Belgrade's bohemian quarter Skadarlija and in her husband's kafana while simultaneously making appearances on radio shows including Bosansko veče (Bosnian Nights) and recording for major record labels like Odeon Records, Polydor Records and Jugoton. Later in her career, she performed with younger generations of singers such as Zehra Deović.
