= Gornji Palež =

- Village
- Location within Bosnia and Herzegovina
- Coordinates: 43°56′N 18°07′E
- Country: Bosnia and Herzegovina
- Entity: Federation of Bosnia and Herzegovina
- Canton: Central Bosnia
- Municipality: Kiseljak

Area
  - Total: 0.84 sq mi (2.17 km^{2})

Population (2013)
  - Total: 88
  - Density: 110/sq mi (41/km^{2})
- Time zone: UTC+1 (CET)
  - Summer (DST): UTC+2 (CEST)

Gornji Palež is a village in the municipality of Kiseljak, Bosnia and Herzegovina. It is 3 kilometers from Lepenica.

== Demographics ==
According to the 2013 census, its population was 88.

Ethnicity in 2013
| Ethnicity | Number | Percentage |
|---|---|---|
| Bosniaks | 81 | 92.0% |
| Croats | 6 | 6.8% |
| other/undeclared | 1 | 1.1% |
| Total | 88 | 100% |
