= Korak do slobode =

Studio album by Galija
- Released: 1989
- Recorded: 1989
- Studio: Studio VI, Radio Belgrade
- Genre: Rock; art rock; folk rock
- Length: 33:24
- Label: PGP-RTB
- Producer: Saša Habić

Galija chronology
Daleko je Sunce (1988)	Korak do slobode (1989)	Još uvek sanjam (Najveći hitovi) (1990)

Korak do slobode (trans. One Step to Freedom) is the seventh studio album from Serbian and Yugoslav rock band Galija, released in 1989. It is the second part of Galija album trilogy comprising Daleko je Sunce (1988), Korak do slobode and Istorija, ti i ja (1991).

== Background and concept ==
The idea of releasing an album trilogy dealing with contemporary political turmoil in Yugoslavia was brought up lyricist Radoman Kanjevac in 1987. Collaboration with Kanjevac, alongside fresh musical ideas brought by a new member, academically educated multi-instrumentalist Bratislav "Bata" Zlatković, resulted in the first part of the trilogy, Daleko je Sunce (Distant Is the Sun), released in 1988. In early 1989, the band recorded the second part of the trilogy, Korak do slobode, in Radio Belgrade's Studio VI, with Saša Habić as the producer.

The album's opening and closing theme were composed by Bratislav Zlatković and played by Zlatković (flute) and guest performer Boban Marković (trumpet). The song "Sloboda" ("Freedom") featured Kerber frontman Goran Šepa on vocals, in a duet with Galija frontman Nenad Milosavljević. While Daleko je sunce featured lyrics by both Kanjevac and the band's second vocalists and long-time lyricist Predrag Milosavljević, all lyrics for Korak do slobode were authored by Kanjevac, with Milosavljević making only a contribution to "Pevaju jutra" ("The Mornings Are Singing") lyrics, much to his dissatisfaction. The lyrics of the title track include a reference to Yugoslav rock bands Prljavo Kazalište, Zabranjeno Pušenje and Boye, and lyrics for "Ljubavna pesma" ("Love Song") feature a verse from the song "Mi Bosanci delije" ("Us Bosnians, Strong Young Men") by folk singer Meho Puzić.

As its predecessor, Korak do slobode featured politically provocative lyrics and imagery: the reggae song "Ljubavna pesma" ("Love Song"), composed by the group's guitarist Jean Jacques Roskam and sung by himself and Nenad Milosavljević, featured ironic lyrics dealing with rising nationalism in Yugoslavia, the title track included the verse "Ide četa čela namrštena, među njima najboljega nema" ("The company is marching with frowns on their faces, the best one is not among them"), taken from the song "Pesma o Krcunu" ("Song about Krcun") by folk singer Slobodan Mulina, dedicated to Slobodan Penezić "Krcun", Yugoslav war hero and communist politician who died in a car accident under suspicious circumstances, and the album cover, designed by Slobodan Kaštavarac, featured an image of army trucks during a military exercise.

Korak do slobode was the band's only album recorded with bass guitarist Predrag Milanović, who joined the band as the replacement for long-time bass guitarist Zoran Radosavljević "Čupa". Soon after the album release, Milanović was replaced by Dušan Karadžić.

== Track listing ==
Side A
No.	Title	Lyrics	Music	Length
1.	"Uvodna tema" ("Opening Theme")		Bratislav Zlatković	0:52
2.	"Noć" ("Night")	Radoman Kanjevac	Nenad Milosavljević	3:54
3.	"Korak do slobode" ("One Step to Freedom")	Radoman Kanjevac	Nenad Milosavljević	2:50
4.	"Na tvojim usnama" ("On Your Lips")	Radoman Kanjevac	Bratislav Zlatković	3:10
5.	"Kopaonik" ("Kopaonik")	Radoman Kanjevac	Bratislav Zlatković	2:45
6.	"Kad me pogledaš" ("When You Look at Me")	Radoman Kanjevac	Nenad Milosavljević	5:14

Side B
No.	Title	Lyrics	Music	Length
1.	"Sloboda" ("Freedom")	Radoman Kanjevac	Bratislav Zlatković	3:30
2.	"Pevaju jutra" ("The Mornings Are Singing")	Radoman Kanjevac; Predrag Milosavljević	Nenad Milosavljević; Jean Jacques Roskam	3:15
3.	"Ljubavna pesma" ("Love Song")	Radoman Kanjevac; Meho Puzić	Jean Jacques Roskam	2:30
4.	"Nasmeši se" ("Smile")	Radoman Kanjevac	Bratislav Zlatković	3:48
5.	"Završna tema" ("Closing Theme")		Bratislav Zlatković	0:52

== Personnel ==
- Nenad Milosavljević - vocals
- Predrag Milosavljević - vocals
- Jean Jacques Roskam - guitar
- Bratislav Zlatković - keyboards, flute, guitar
- Predrag Milanović - bass guitar
- Boban Pavlović - drums

=== Additional personnel ===
- Goran Šepa - vocals (on track B1)
- Boban Marković - trumpet (on tracks: A1, B5)
- Saša Habić - producer
- Aleksandar Vitorović - recorded by
- Slobodan Kaštavarac - design
- Milanko Riljić - photography

== Reception and legacy ==
Korak do slobode was well received by fans and critics. The album hits included "Na tvojim usnama", "Kopaonik", "Korak do slobode" and the ballad "Kad me pogledaš". At the end of the year, Yugoslav music magazine Pop Rock proclaimed "Na tvojim usnama" the Song of the Year, and Nenad Milosavljević won the Composer of the Year Award at MESAM festival (although Zlatković had composed the album's biggest hits).

In 2015, Korak do slobode album cover was ranked 78th on the list of 100 Greatest Album Covers of Yugoslav Rock published by web magazine Balkanrock.
