= Prva plovidba =

Studio album by Galija
- Released: 1979
- Genres: Progressive rock; symphonic rock; blues rock
- Length: 39:09
- Label: PGP-RTB
- Producer: Toma Milaković

Galija chronology
Prva plovidba (1979)	Druga plovidba (1980)

Prva plovidba (trans. The First Sail) is the debut studio album by Serbian and Yugoslav rock band Galija, released in 1979.

== Background ==
Galija was formed in Niš in 1977 by promising singer-songwriter Nenad Milosavljević and the members of the band Dva Lustera (Two Chandeliers). Following appearances at several prominent Yugoslav music festivals–including winning the first place at Gitarijada festival in Zaječar–the group signed a contract with PGP-RTB record label and entered the studio to record their debut album. Four out of seven album tracks featured lyrics written by Nenad Milosavljević's brother Predrag Milosavljević, who also appeared on the album as guest vocalist. Predrag Milosavljević would become the group's official member with the release of the band's second album Druga plovidba (The Second Sail) in 1980. Prva plovidba is the band's only album recorded with guitarist Goran Ljubisavljević, bass guitarist Predrag Branković and keyboardist Ljubodrag Vukadinović, who would, following the band's appearance at 1979 Rock Spectacle festival at Belgrade's JNA Stadium, be replaced by Dušan Radivojević, Zoran "Čupa" Radosavljević and Nebojša Marković respectively.

== Track listing ==
Side A: Isplovljenje (Sailing Out)
No.	Title	Lyrics	Music	Length
1.	"Avanturista" ("Adventurer")	Predrag Milosavljević	Nenad Milosavljević	4:25
2.	"Letnja pesma" ("Summer Song")	Predrag Milosavljević	Nenad Milosavljević	4:37
3.	"Pesma za dobro jutro" ("Good Morning Song")	Predrag Milosavljević	Nenad Milosavljević	3:12
4.	"Posrednik" ("Middleman")	Predrag Milosavljević	Nenad Milosavljević	7:30

Side B: Uplovljenje (Sailing In)
No.	Title	Lyrics	Music	Length
1.	"Mađioničar" ("Magician")	Nenad Milosavljević	Nenad Milosavljević	4:42
2.	"Gospi" ("To the Lady")	Nenad Milosavljević	Nenad Milosavljević	4:49
3.	"Decimen"	Goran Ljubisavljević	Nenad Milosavljević	9:44

== Personnel ==
- Nenad Milosavljević - vocals, acoustic guitar, harmonica, arranged by (track B3)
- Goran Ljubisavljević - guitar, arranged by (tracks: A1, A2, A3)
- Predrag Branković - bass guitar
- Ljubodrag Vukadinović - keyboards
- Boban Pavlović - drums

=== Additional personnel ===
- Predrag Milosavljević - vocals
- Toma Milaković - producer
- Petar Gaković - engineer
- Milan Martinović - cover design
- Milenko Miletić - logo design
- Aleksandar Dolgij - photography

== Reception ==
Despite the album receiving mixed reviews in Yugoslav music press, the tracks "Avanturista", "Gospi" and "Decimen" became the first hits for the band.
