= Ismet Alajbegović Šerbo =

Ismet Alajbegović

Background information
- Born: 6 March 1925; Sarajevo, Kingdom of Yugoslavia
- Died: 28 July 1987 (aged 62); Sarajevo, SR Bosnia and Herzegovina, SFR Yugoslavia
- Occupation: musician
- Years active: 1945–1987
- Musical career
- Genres: sevdalinka; Bosnian folk
- Instrument: accordion
- Labels: Jugoton

Ismet Alajbegović "Šerbo" (6 March 1925 – 28 July 1987) was a Bosnian accordionist, composer, and writer of folk songs.

When Radio Sarajevo became operational following the liberation of Sarajevo in 1945, Alajbegović started performing on and became an employee of Radio Sarajevo, along with his friend, the singer Zaim Imamović. They became the stations' first musicians. He played accordion while Imamović sang. Later Imamović was the major singing star of the Radio Sarajevo, while Alajbegović became the leader of the orchestra, the arranger and songwriter.

Throughout his career, Alajbegović composed many folk songs, sung by artists like Silvana Armenulić, Himzo Polovina, and Safet Isović.
