= Radio Sarajevo =

- Sarajevo; Bosnia and Herzegovina
- Broadcast area: Bosnia and Herzegovina

Programming
- Language: Bosnian language
- Format: Public broadcasting

Ownership
- Sister stations: Radio Sarajevo 202; Radio Sarajevo 3 Radio Sarajevo 2

History
- First air date: 10 April 1945; 80 years ago

Technical information
- Transmitter coordinates: 43°52′N 18°25′E

Links
- Website: www.bhrt.ba/uzivo/bhr1

Radio Sarajevo is a radio station and magazine that began airing 10 April 1945, four days after the liberation of Sarajevo, Bosnia and Herzegovina near the end of World War II. It was Bosnia and Herzegovina's first radio station. The first words spoken by announcer Đorđe Lukić were "This is Radio Sarajevo... Death to fascism, freedom to the people!"

Today, its legal successor is national public broadcasting service, BHRT via BH Radio 1.

== Radio Sarajevo 202 ==
In the urban area of Sarajevo, the first local radio station was opened on 1 July 1971 under the name Radio Sarajevo 202 (or Sarajevo 202 (AM from frequency 202). Unlike the other 24 local radio stations in BiH, 202 was designed to entertain, inform and create a new role of radio listeners.

== Radio Sarajevo 3 ==
The third program (Treći program) Radio Sarajevo 3 started in 1973 and it was dedicated to the scientific and theoretical considerations, classical music and art.

== Radio Sarajevo 2 ==
Founded in 1975, correspondent network of the new national radio program Radio Sarajevo 2 (Drugi program) accounted more than 52 local radio stations with a coverage of about 80% of the population of BiH. Other local radio stations in Bosnia and Herzegovina were mainly funded by local governments and set up with the expertise of Radio Sarajevo, as part of the instruments of local governments, together with local newspapers and later TV stations. Radio stations jointly operated together with RTV Sarajevo national network and other members of the Yugoslav Radio Television media system.

== Music production ==
As main national broadcaster for Bosnia and Herzegovina, Radio Sarajevo was responsible for the careers of most of SFR Yugoslavia's music stars. They signed singers such as Zaim Imamović, Ismet Alajbegović, Zehra Deović, Beba Selimović, Emina Zečaj, Hanka Paldum, and Safet Isović, Kemal Monteno, Zdravko Čolić, Neda Ukraden, INDEXI, Ambasadori, KAMEN NA KAMEN, among others. They even aired comedy acts like Momo and Uzeir.
