= Fejat Sejdić =

Serbian trumpeter (1941–2017)

(undated)

Fejat Sejdić (Serbian: Фејат Сејдић) (20 January 1941 – 22 August 2017) was a Serbian Romani trumpeter and Balkan brass band leader from Bojnik, in south Serbia. Coming from a family of trumpeters and performing since he was a child, his band was the most successful orchestra at the Guča Trumpet Festival, the largest trumpet festival in the world, while he was named "The master of Guča for all times" and the "King of Trumpet". Though he performed all over the world playing for the world dignitaries and celebrities, and collaborated with musicians like the Gipsy Kings and Goran Bregović, he never learned to read the notes and only played by ear.

== Early life ==
Sejdić was born on 20 January 1941 in Bojnik, in south Serbia. His father Kadrija (d. 1955), and grandfather Rustem Sejdić (b. 1892) were also trumpeters. He had two older brothers, Ćazim and Demir.

Rustem was a trumpeter in the 2nd Infantry Division of the Royal Serbian Army, the famed "Iron regiment", during the World War I. On 12 September 1916 the Battle of Kaymakchalan, for the Kajmakčalan mountain between the Serbs and the Bulgarian "Rila Division" began. From 26 to 30 September, the top of the mountain changed hands several times, but Bulgarian had an upper hand and it seemed the Serbs will have to withdraw. Out of the blue, the Serbian charge was played by Rustem and Serbian army attacked the surprised Bulgarians who backed off, allowing the Serbs to conquer the mountain and end the battle on 30 September. Commander Dimitrije Milić, who didn't give the charge order, summoned Rustem to be court-martialed for disobedience but instead, after Rustem told him "I had to do it, whether you shot me or not", he awarded him a medal. Inspecting the battlefield later, Milić discovered a barrel of rum, but it is not known whether Rustem knew that the Bulgarian soldiers were drunk. In 1917, the news of horrible Bulgarian reprisals after the Toplica Uprising (over 20.000 dead) in occupied southern Serbia, reached the Serbian army Salonika front. Many soldiers originated from the region, including Rustem. He sneaked to the closest Bulgarian position, listened and memorized their trumpet sounds. Days later, with two soldiers, he crawled to the Bulgarian position during the night and while the soldiers threw grenades, he played the Serbian charge. Awaken, Serbian army run forward on an unplanned charge. Rustem then sneaked back and played Bulgarian retreat. Confused, Bulgarian army withdrew and Serb took the position. Tomorrow, Rustem was awarded medals from both prince-regent Alexander and the French general Louis Franchet d'Espèrey. Among his medals were the Order of Karađorđe's Star and the Albanian Commemorative Medal.

Fejat's father Kadrija didn't teach him to play. He had only one trumpet, which was the family's main source of income. Fejat tried to play the trumpet for the first time when he was 3 years old. He listened to his father and learned by ear, while practicing on his father's trumpet when he would leave the house. Though still a child, by the age of 10 he could play like an adult and when he father noticed that, he took him into his band, but when he turned 14 and his father died, Fejat founded his own orchestra. He became a professional player in 1960.

== Career ==
He performed at the Guča trumpet Festival (founded in 1961) for the first time in 1969. It was the only time, out of 22 performances, that he didn't receive some of the awards. Next time he performed in 1976 and after winning all there was to be won, he withdrew from the competition and performed only as a guest artist, though Sejdić later stated that he was politely asked not to compete anymore. In time, four awards distinguished themselves as the most important at the festival. In the descending order of importance, they are: best orchestra, first trumpet, folk playing (all awarded by the jury) and Golden trumpet (voted by the audience). Every performer with three wins in any of the categories is being declared a "master of trumpet". The rules were amended in 2017, so now two of those three wins have to be awards given by the jury. This was done as some very young players won several audience awards due to their popularity. The most wins in all four categories had Milan Babić, with 11 wins from 1972 to 2003, but turned into the points (awarding 4, 3, 2 and 1 point according to the importance of the award), the list is topped by Sejdić (32 points, Babić being second with 28) who has been declared "The master of Guča for all times".

The trumpet asks for your soul, it won't work without the soul. What do you need the notes for, if you have no soul?

Just like his father and grandfather, he learned to play by ear, never learning the notes. When he was performing at the World Festival in France in 1982, his band was selected to perform the hymn of the festival with the local singer. He was given the sheets and when the singer understood that Sejdić can't read notes, he began panicking. Sejdić told him to calm sown and to sing him the tune ones. He then sequestered the band and after a short practice, they played the piece perfectly. This performance marked the beginning of his international career.

He performed on Trafalgar Square in London, Champs-Élysées in Paris, Germany, Bulgaria, Sweden, Africa, Australia, etc. In Moscow, his band performed constantly walking and playing for 10 km (6.2 mi). He personally played for many politicians, both local (Josip Broz Tito ("he was quite a jolly fellow", Sejdić recalled later), Slobodan Milošević ("he wasn't joyful at all"), Zoran Đinđić) and international (Charles De Gaul, Willy Brandt, Leonid Brezhnev, Queen Elizabeth II, but also to artists and celebrities like Orson Welles, Salvador Dalí, Elizabeth Taylor, Richard Burton, Ayrton Senna.

He performed with the Gipsy Kings on their European tour and collaborated with Goran Bregović on the soundtrack for the Time of the Gypsies in 1989. Sejdić also worked with Živojin Pavlović on the music for the film Body Scent in 1983 and with Vlatko Stefanovski. He also worked with numerous Serbian singers, including Predrag Živković Tozovac, Snežana Babić Sneki and Ceca Ražnatović.

His discography consists of some 60 singles, LP's and CD's. In 1988 he recorded the song Balada ("Ballad"), the adaptation of the classical Negro spiritual Amazing Grace. It was one of the songs performed at this funeral.

== Awards ==
Among his Guča awards, he won a record six "Best Orchestra" awards (1976, 1983, 1985, 1987, 1991, 1994), one "Best Trumpet" award (1981) and one "Golden Trumpet" award (1982). Seventh highest award, "Best Orchestra", was won by his orchestra in 2004, when his grandson Nebojša already took over.

He received numerous other awards, domestic and foreign. In 1987 the Presidency of Yugoslavia awarded him with the Order of Labor with Silver Wreath. He was awarded a "Special recognition for artistic contribution to the national culture of Serbia“, colloquially styled "national pension" in 2013.

== Legacy ==
He set the new, high standards in the brass music. The sound of his trumpet was quite distinctive ("20 orchestras can play at the same time, and you will always know where is Fejat playing, like you can recognize the voice of a singer") When he became famous, his orchestra was the only one in Bojnik. In 2016 there were 15 bands.

Due to the white attire of his orchestra and his personal mannerism, he was nicknamed "Gentleman in white", but also a "Mister Trumpeter" and The Gypsy Baron.

He suffered a stroke in 2001 which partially paralyzed his right arm, so he wasn't able to play the trumpet anymore. His son Zoran was a bandleader for a short time but the orchestra was disbanded in 2002 due to the bad management. Few years later, Fejat's grandson and Zoran's son Nebojša Sejdić (b. 1981) took over and formed the orchestra again, naming it "Fejat Sejdić".

== Personal life ==
He was married to Stana Sejdić (b. 1941, d. 2007) and had three children, son Zoran (b. 1961) and daughters Mila and Suzana. Suzana married into the family of Bakija Bakić from Vranje, another famous trumpeter. Sejdić died on 22 August 2017 in his hometown, Bojnik.
