= Dobriša Cesarić =

Croatian poet and translator (1902–1980)

- Born: 10 January 1902; Požega, Kingdom of Croatia-Slavonia, Austria-Hungary (now Požega, Croatia)
- Died: 18 December 1980 (aged 78); Zagreb, SR Croatia, SFR Yugoslavia (now Zagreb, Croatia)
- Occupations: poet, writer, translator
- Writing career
- Language: Croatian
- Period: 1916–1970
- Literary movement: Modernism

Dobriša Cesarić (Croatian pronunciation: [ˈdobriʃa ˈt͡sěsarit͡ɕ]; 10 January 1902 – 18 December 1980) was a Croatian poet and translator. In 1951, he became a member of the Yugoslav Academy of Sciences and Arts.

== Literary work ==
His first appearance on the literary scene was when he was 14 years old, with the poem I ja ljubim ("I Love Too") published in a youth magazine Pobratim ("Blood Brother"). His poetic oeuvre consists of ten collections of poems and a few translations.

== Work as a translator ==
He translated from German, Russian, Italian, Bulgarian and Hungarian to Croatian.

== Works ==
- Lirika, Zagreb, 1931.
- Spasena svjetla, Zagreb, 1938.
- Izabrani stihovi, Zagreb, 1942.
- Pjesme (Voćka poslije kiše), Zagreb, 1951.
- Knjiga prepjeva, Zagreb 1951.
- Osvijetljeni put, Zagreb, 1953.
- Tri pjesme, Zagreb, 1955.
- Goli časovi, Novi Sad, 1956.
- Proljeće koje nije moje, Zagreb, 1957.
- Izabrane pjesme, Zagreb, 1960.
- Poezija, Skopje, 1965.
- Moj prijatelju mene više nema., Zagreb, 1966.
- Slap, izabrane pjesme, Zagreb, 1970.
- Svjetla za daljine, Belgrade, 1975.
- Izabrana lirika, Belgrade, 1975.
- Izabrane pjesme i prepjevi, Sarajevo, 1975.
- Pjesme. Memoarska proza, Zagreb, 1976 (Pet stoljeća hrvatske književnosti, book 113).
- Voćka poslije kiše, Zagreb, 1978.

Published posthumously

- Spasena svjetla, Zagreb, 1985.
- Srebrna zrnca u pjesniku, Zagreb, 1985.
- Balada iz predgrađa, Zagreb, 1992.
- Povratak, Zagreb, 1995.
- Kadikad, Zagreb, 1997.
- Dobriša Cesarić. Pjesme., ABC naklada, Zagreb, 2007.
- Izabrana djela, Matica hrvatska, Zagreb, 2008.
