= Zaim Imamović =

- Born: 26 August 1920; Mrkonjić Grad, Kingdom of Serbs, Croats and Slovenes
- Died: 2 February 1994 (aged 73); Sarajevo, Republic of Bosnia and Herzegovina
- Occupations: musician; singer; author
- Years active: 1939–1994
- Musical career
- Genres: sevdalinka; Bosnian folk
- Instrument: vocals
- Labels: Jugoton; PGP RTB; Sarajevo Disk; Beograd Disk

Zaim Imamović (26 August 1920 – 2 February 1994) was a Bosnian sevdalinka-folk singer, accordionist and author.

== Biography ==
Imamović was born into a Bosniak family in Mrkonjić Grad, modern Bosnia and Herzegovina and after a year his family moved to Travnik and there he lived for fifteen years when, in 1936, he moved to Sarajevo. He lived in Sarajevo for the rest of his life occasionally vacationing in Počitelj where he had a cottage. In Sarajevo he attended textile school and was discovered by a choir leader Cvjetko Rihtman in the cultural society "Gajret" where his sister Đula and his brother Hadžo also sang. When Radio Sarajevo became operational following the liberation of Sarajevo in April 1945, he started performing on and became an employee of Radio Sarajevo, often sleeping under the piano overnight so not to miss the morning telecast.

At that time he performed three sevdah songs: "Gledaj me draga", "Konja vodim, pješke hodim" and "Mujo kuje konja po mjesecu" and became very popular (the last of the three songs is one of the most popular sevdah songs ever). His popularity increased in time and he is said to be the best sevdalinka performer of his time and a reformer of the genre. Some of his most popular sevdalinkas include "Haj, Moščanice vodo plemenita", "Od kako sam sevdah svezo", "Okreni se niz đul-bašču", "Haj, sadih almu na sred Atmejdana", "Ja zagrizoh šareniku jabuku", "Đul Fatima po đul-bašči šeće", and "Kad puhnuše sabah-zorski vjetrovi".

Zaim Imamović was under influence of important sevdah singers of the time: Rešad Bešlagić, Sulejman Džakić, Ibrahim Ašćerić, and others. Together with them he developed an important new style of sevdah singing that was peculiar for radio performance. It was a sharp contrast to earlier singers influenced by bel canto traditions of the European discography market, such as Bora Janjić and Sofka Nikolić.

Zaim Imamović wrote some of the most popular sevdalinkas: "Sve behara i sve cvjeta", "O, jeseni, tugo moja", "Nesretan sam, majko moja mila", "Kono moja", "Što je lijepo vrelo Mošćanice", and "Zašto si me majko rodila".

He was one of the founders of the Ilidža Folk Music Festival in Sarajevo. After initial success of the festival, intending to stir up new trends in traditional music, Zaim Imamović retreated from the festival at the beginning of 1970s.

Zaim Imamović died in Sarajevo during the Siege of Sarajevo, on 2 February 1994.
