= Nenad Milosavljević =

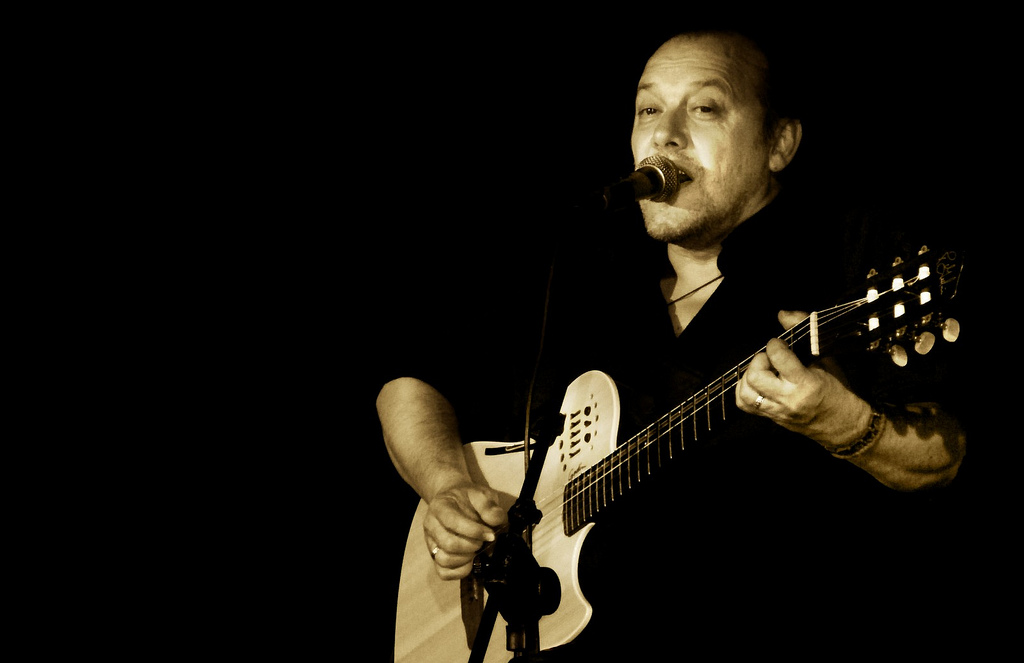
- Nenad Milosavljević in 2008

Background information
- Also known as: Neša Galija
- Born: February 6, 1954 (age 72); Niš, PR Serbia, FPR Yugoslavia
- Origin: Niš, Serbia
- Genres: Progressive rock; symphonic rock; rock; art rock; folk rock; children's music
- Occupations: Musician; composer; music producer
- Instruments: Vocals; acoustic guitar; harmonica
- Years active: Early 1970s–present
- Labels: PGP RTB; PGP RTS; Raglas; Hit Records
- Website: www.galija.rs

Nenad "Neša" Milosavljević (Serbian Cyrillic: Ненад "Неша" Милосављевић, born 6 February 1954), also known as Neša Galija (Неша Галија), is a Serbian and Yugoslav musician, composer, music producer and former politician, best known as the frontman of the popular rock band Galija. He is the brother of Galija vocalist and lyricist Predrag "Peca" Milosavljević.

Nenad Milosavljević started his musical career in the early 1970s, performing on festivals in his home city of Niš. By the mid-1970s, he had gained the attention of the Yugoslav public as promising singer-songwriter. In 1977, with the members of Niš band Dva Lustera, he formed Galija. The group and Nenad Milosavljević gained loyal fanbase with their early progressive rock works, reaching the peak of popularity with their art rock albums of the late 1980s and early 1990s. With Galija, Milosavljević has released 15 studio albums and a live album. In addition to his work with Galija, Milosavljević has composed music for film and theatre. He has written music for three feature films and over 100 theatre plays.

Milosavljević is a member of the Socialist Party of Serbia, and is a former deputy in the National Assembly of Serbia.

== Biography ==
=== Early life ===
Milosavljević was born on 6 February 1954, in Niš, to father Čedomir and mother Branislava Milosavljević. His brother Predrag was born three years earlier.

Milosavljević went to Ratko Vukićević Elementary School in Niš. As a child, he learned to play the accordion, participating in competitions of young accordionists. He learned to play the guitar in high school. At the same time, he sang in Dr Vojislav Vučković Music School choir and in Culture and Arts Society Veljko Vlahović choir. As a teenager, influenced by the hippie movement, he started playing acoustic guitar and harmonica in Niš parks and on beaches of the Yugoslav Adriatic coast, performing covers of international hits. He also started composing, writing his first songs on poems by renowned poets. His early songs included "Čuj kako jauče vetar" ("Hear the Wind Howl"), composed on a poem by Dobriša Cesarić, and "Pozna jesen" ("Late Autumn"), composed on a poem by Vojislav Ilić.

=== Musical career ===
==== Early career ====
Milosavljević had his first public performance in September 1970, in a club in Niš, playing acoustic guitar and harmonica. Soon after the performance, with the help of Milan Marković, member of the popular Niš band Lutajuća Srca, Milosavljević made his first recordings in Radio Niš studio. After the recording sessions, Milosavljević performed with Lutajuća Srca on several occasions. Simultaneously, he continued to perform alone, appearing at Evenings of Acoustic Music and Evenings of Anglistics held in his home city, as well as at Evening of Poetry and Music held as a part of the Niš Film Festival, performing his own songs, as well as covers of songs by foreign acts. In 1973, he appeared on Youth Festival's Evening of Free Forms, as a replacement for previously announced Lutajuća Srca on a suggestion by the band members themselves. The appearance on the festival helped him appear in several radio shows, including Radio Belgrade show Veče uz radio (Evening by the Radio). He gained additional attention of the public when his song "Ta je ulica meni znana" ("That Street is Known to Me"), composed on a poem by Sergei Yesenin, was performed by Lutajuća Srca at the 1974 Belgrade Spring Festival.

Soon after his first successes, Milosavljević got the opportunity to compose music for the theatre play Etide (Études), in which he also appeared in the role of the troubadour. This was followed by his collaborations with the Niš Puppet Theatre, Niš Student Theatre, Niš Youth Theatre and the amateur theatre Treća polovina (Third Half). After he wrote music for Treća Polovina play Ljubav i Oliver (Love and Oliver), which was to be performed by a band throughout the play, he invited members of Niš band Dva Lustera (Two Chandeliers) to perform with him. They held their first rehearsal together on 4 January 1976.

==== Galija ====
On 11 April 1977, Milosavljević held a concert in the building of Niš National Theatre, with Dva Lustera performing as his backing band. The concert also featured Lutajuća Srca, acoustic rock band Život from Kruševac and Ratko Vukićević Elementary School choir. After the concert, Milosavljević and Dva Lustera members agreed to start working together as a band under the name Galija. The first lineup of the group consisted of Nenad Milosavljević (vocals, acoustic guitar, harmonica), Goran Ljubisavljević (guitar), Predrag Branković (bass guitar), Nenad Tančić (drums) and Bratsilav Stamenković (keyboards). Tančić was soon replaced by Boban Pavlović, who would, during the following years, remain one of rare mainstay members of the group. Galija released their debut album Prva plovidba (The First Sail) in 1979. Although he took part in songwriting process and recording sessions, Predrag Milosavljević did not become an official member of Galija until the release of their second album Druga plovidba (The Second Sail) in 1980. The band's first several releases featured progressive rock sound, but in the mid-1980s they turned towards more mainstream-oriented rock sound. Galija reached the peak of popularity in the late 1980s and early 1990s, becoming one of the most popular acts on the Serbian rock scene.

Milosavljević was the only author of the music on the band's first three studio albums, Prva plovidba, Druga plovidba and Ipak verujem u sebe (1982). During the following years, other Galija members also composed music for the group's songs, but since the release of the 1996 album Trinaest, Milosavljević has been the band's only composer.

==== Solo recordings and guest appearances ====
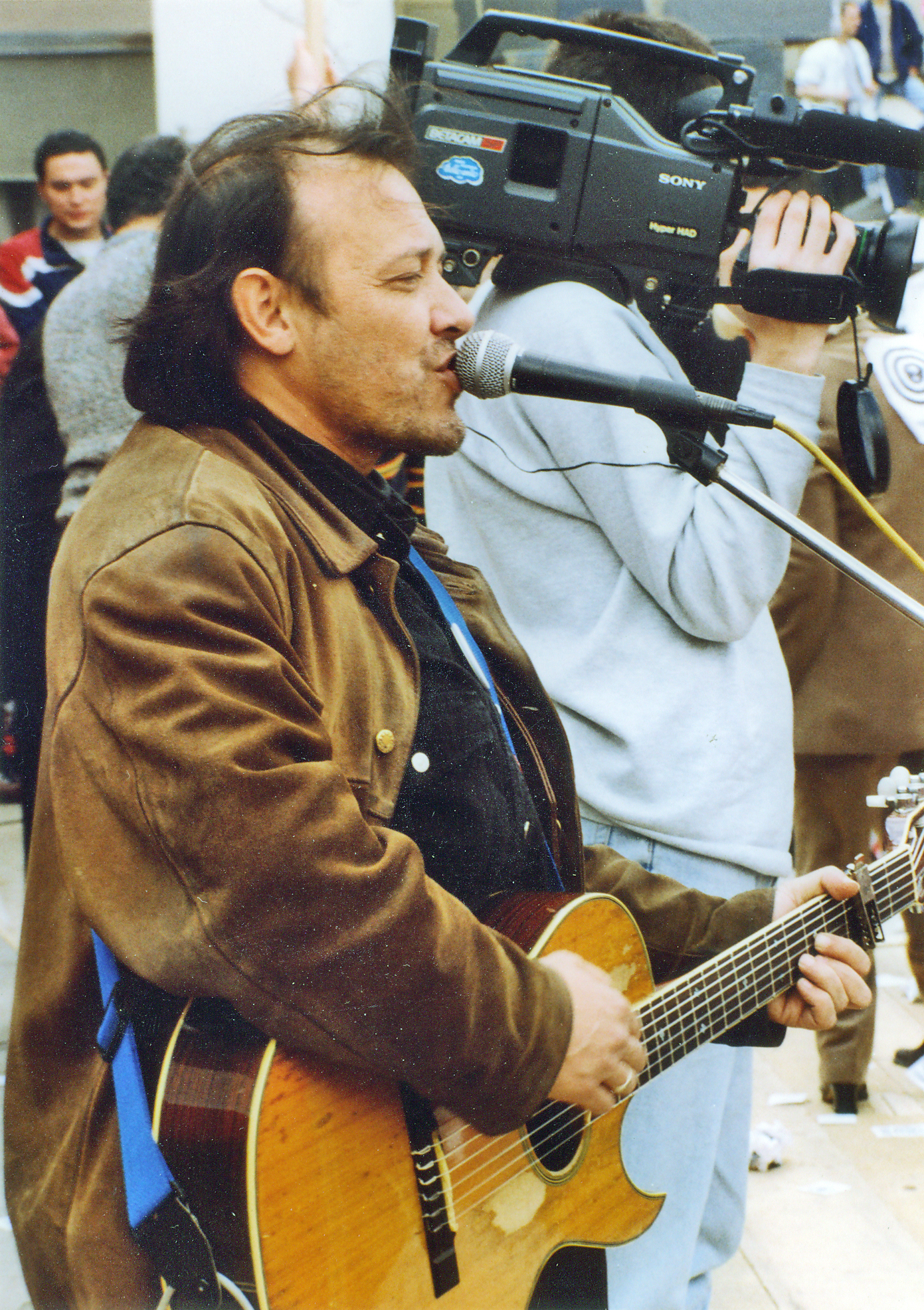
Nenad Milosavljević performing on a protest against NATO bombing of FR Yugoslavia in Niš in 1999

During his career, Milosavljević has made only few solo recordings. In 1998, he appeared, alongside Toni Montano, Viktorija, Dejan Cukić & Spori Ritam Band, Ksenija Pajčin, Maja Nikolić, Neverne Bebe and other acts, on the charity live album Terorizam ne! (Terrorism No!) with the song "Jeleni" ("Deers"). In 2013, he appeared at the Beosong festival with the song "Ruža od baruta" ("Gunpowder Rose"), but failed to qualify to the finals.

Milosavljević played harmonica on the song "Ti si lija, ti si zmija" ("You're a Vixen, You're a Serpent") by Yugoslav hard rock band Griva, released on their 1983 album Kog sam đavola tražio u tebi (What the Hell I Saw in You). Milosavljević provided vocals for the title song on the 2013 album Duša tanana (Gentle Soul) by Serbian saxophonist Jova Maljoković. He appeared as guest vocalist on the song "Prijatelj" ("Friend"), released on the album Gitarologija: Povratak korenima (Guitarology: Return to the Roots), by Serbian blues rock band Point Blank.

==== Theatre music ====
Milosavljević started writing music for theatre while still in his teenage years. He debuted with music for the theatre play Etide, in which he also appeared in the role of the troubadour. In 1972, he composed the music for the play Aska and the Wolf (adapted from a short story by Ivo Andrić), performed in Niš Puppet Theatre.

During the following years, Milosavljević wrote music for more than 100 theatre pieces, performed in National Theatre in Belgrade, Belgrade Drama Theatre, Terazije Theatre, Atelje 212, DES Theatre in Belgrade, National Theatre in Niš, Niš Puppet Theatre, National Theatre in Kikinda, Theatre Bora Stanković in Vranje, National Theatre in Leskovac, Priština Theatre, Sombor Theatre, National Theatre in Banja Luka, and other theatres.

==== Film music ====
In 2002, Milosavljević wrote music for Zdravko Šotra's hit film Zona Zamfirova. Milosavljević's music, alongside other music used in the film, was released on two CDs, Zona Zamfirova – Zonina muzika (Zona Zamfirova – Zona's Music) and Zona Zamfirova – Manetova muzika (Zona Zamfirova – Mane's Music). In 2003, Milosavljević wrote music for Šotra's film The Robbery of the Third Reich. The songs from the film were performed by Predrag Milosavljević, Mića Kostić and Ana Sofrenović, and ethnic music themes were performed by Srđan Azirović's Trumpet Orchestra. The music from the film was released as a soundtrack album in 2004. In 2017, Milosavljević wrote music for Zona Zamfirova sequel Zona Zamfirova 2, directed by Jug Radivojević.

==== Children's music ====
From 1974 to 1991, Milosavljević had collaborated with the Niš Scout Music Festival as composer and arranger. Since 1979, he has collaborated with Kuršumlija's children's music festival Prolećna pesma (Spring Song) as composer and arranger, and since 1986 as the festival editor. From 1979 to 1994, he had collaborated with Niš Children's Music Festival as composer and arranger. In 2013, he wrote the song "Kad bi meni dali" ("If Someone Would Give Me") for the album Kolibri planeta (Hummingbird Planet) by children's choir Kolibri.

==== Album production ====
In 2004, Milosavljević produced and wrote arrangements for the Balkan Brass album Kalompuri (Black Train) by Srđan Azirović's Trumpet Orchestra. During the same year, he co-produced Galija album Dobro jutro, to sam ja with the band's guitarist Dragutin Jakovljević. In 2008, he produced and wrote arrangements for the album Nečujna zvona (Silent Bells), featuring traditional songs of Kosovo and Metohija, performed by singer Milica Milosavljević Dugalić.

=== Political career and controversy ===
Milosavljević is a member of the Socialist Party of Serbia. In the mid-1990s, Galija held a number of free open-air concerts organized by the Party, which–although the band had never adopted the Party's nationalist rhetoric or promoted the Party in their work–provoked part of the Serbian public and music press to label Galija as a "state band" and "court band"; Galija's collaboration with the regime of Slobodan Milošević during the time when most of Serbian (both mainstream and underground) rock acts protested against it would influence the reception of the band's work in years to follow. Following the promotional concert in Niš's Čair park, Predrag Milosavljević left the band.

On April 16, 2014, after the 2014 parliamentary election, Milosavljević became a deputy in the National Assembly of Serbia. He remained a deputy until 2016 Serbian parliamentary election.

== Discography ==
=== With Galija ===
- Prva plovidba (1979)
- Druga plovidba (1980)
- Ipak verujem u sebe (1982)
- Bez naglih skokova (1984)
- Digni ruku (1986)
- Daleko je Sunce (1988)
- Korak do slobode (1989)
- Istorija, ti i ja (1991)
- Karavan (1994)
- Trinaest (1996)
- Voleti voleti (1997)
- Južnjačka uteha (1999)
- Dobro jutro, to sam ja (2005)
- Mesto pored prozora (2010)
- U raju iznad oblaka (2018)

=== Solo ===
- "Jeleni" (Terorizam ne!, 1998)
