= Predrag Milosavljević =

- Born: 1908; Lužani, Kragujevac, Kingdom of Serbia
- Died: 1989 (aged 80–81); Belgrade, Yugoslavia
- Occupations: painter, lawyer, diplomat and dramaturge
- Known for: receiving the Grand Prix during the International exhibition in Paris in 1937

Predrag Peđa Milosavljević (Lužani, Kragujevac, Kingdom of Serbia 1908 — Belgrade, Yugoslavia 1989) was painter, lawyer, diplomat and dramaturge and member of Serbian Academy of Sciences and Arts. He received the Grand Prix during the International exhibition in Paris in 1937.

One street in Belgrade on Bežanijska kosa was named after him.

== Selected works ==
- Između trube i tišine, book of essay
- Zopir, drama

== See also ==
- List of painters from Serbia
