= Silvana Armenulić =

Yugoslav singer (1939–1976)

Silvana
- Portrait on vinyl cover "Jugo, moja Jugo" (1971) by Jugoton
- Born: Zilha Bajraktarević; 10 February 1939; Doboj, Kingdom of Yugoslavia
- Died: 10 October 1976 (aged 37); Kolari, SR Serbia, SFR Yugoslavia
- Cause of death: Traffic collision
- Occupations: Singer; songwriter; actress
- Years active: 1965–1976
- Spouse: Radmilo Armenulić (m. 1961)
- Children: 1
- Relatives: Mirjana Bajraktarević (sister); Dina Bajraktarević (sister); Sabahudin Bilalović (nephew)
- Musical career
- Genres: Sevdalinka; folk
- Labels: Diskos; PGP-RTB; Jugoton

Signature
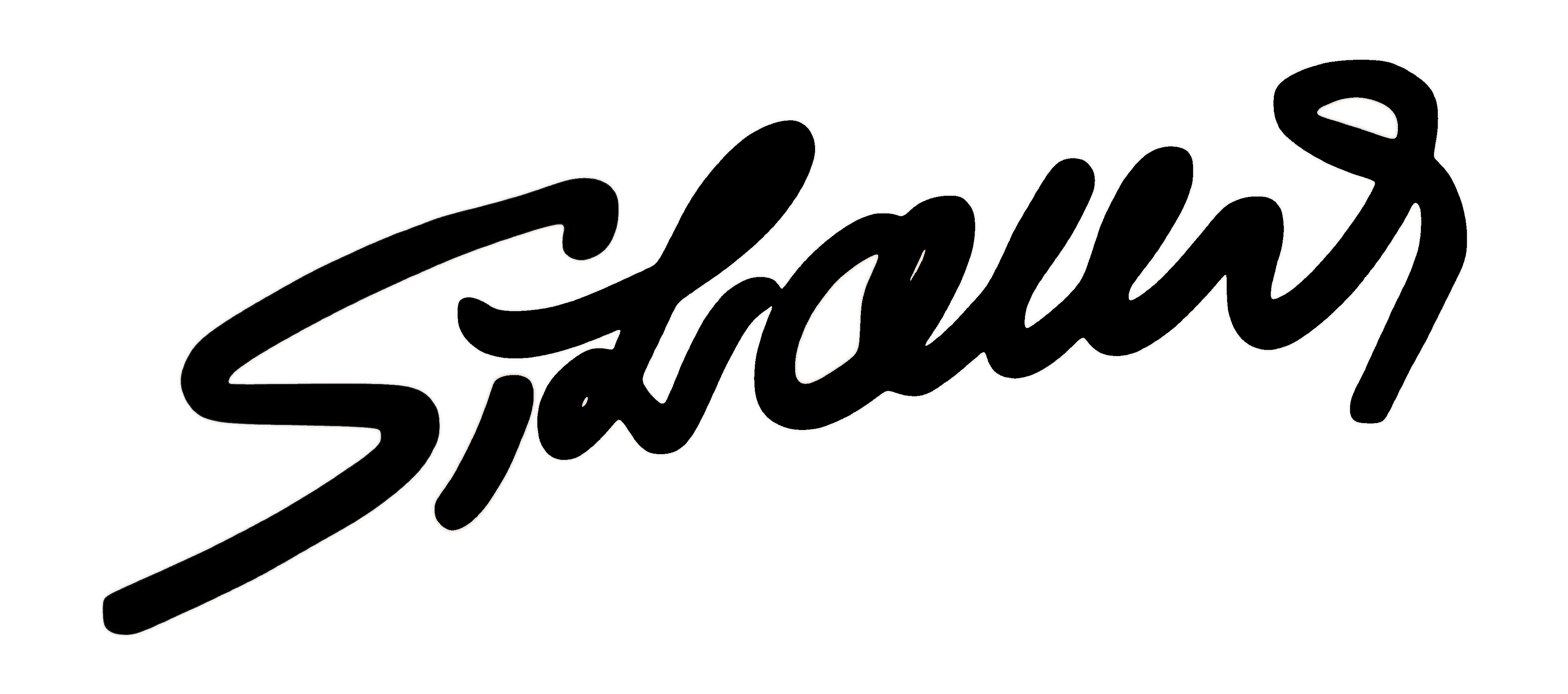

Zilha Armenulić (née Bajraktarević; 10 February 1939 – 10 October 1976), professionally known as Silvana, was a Yugoslav singer, songwriter, and actress. Dubbed the “Queen of Sevdalinka” (“kraljica sevdalinke”), she was one of the most prominent performers of sevdalinka and folk music in the former Yugoslavia. She was known for her distinctive singing style and recognizable vocal timbre. Her song “Šta će mi život” (1970), written by her friend and contemporary Toma Zdravković, is regarded as one of the best-selling singles in the former Yugoslavia.

== Life ==
=== 1939–55: Early life, family and interest in music ===
Born Zilha Bajraktarević in Doboj, Kingdom of Yugoslavia, she was the third of thirteen children in a Bosnian Muslim family. Her father was Mehmed Bajraktarević (1909–1966), owner of a local cake shop called Jagoda (Strawberry), and her mother was Hajrija (1916–2008). Zilha survived a bout with diphtheria as a child shortly after World War II.

Zilha had a brother named Hajrudin who died about two weeks after being mauled by a dog in the 1940s. After her brother's death, her father found solace in alcohol and solitude, neglecting the family and his business. After her father's cake shop closed, the family suffered greatly. Some of her earliest memories were of her father's absence and the World War II, when mother Hajrija and the children hid in the basement from the Ustasha troops. The family of thirteen children included Zilha's sisters Mirsada, Hajrudina, Abida, and Ševka, and brothers Hajrudin, Muhamed, Izudin, Abudin, and Ismet. Her sister Ševka's son Sabahudin Bilalović became a professional basketball player who died at age 43 of a heart attack on the beach while swimming with his son. Ten years later, Ševka and her husband Lutvo both died of natural causes in September 2013, just days apart.

Zilha began singing at an early age and she would later say that she got her voice from her father, a bohemian. As a child, she would sing to him while sitting in his lap. But when she had thoughts of pursuing a professional singing career, her father was not supportive. Then one day, after coming home hung over from a night of drinking, and with the wave of a hand, he said "Go! If you really want to be a singer, go." In 1947, she was enrolled into elementary school, where she learned to play the mandolin, which was a gift from her parents. After that, she played the mandolin and sang more and more, but her grades in school kept declining. By the time she reached the eighth grade, all interest in school had been lost and she had made a name for herself locally as prominent kafana singer.

=== 1959–68: Marriage and relationships ===
Zilha met her husband, tennis player Radmilo Armenulić, in 1959 when she was singing at the Grand Casino in Belgrade. They married two years later on 26 October 1961 and their daughter Gordana was born on 13 January 1965. After seven years of marriage, Radmilo allegedly cheated on Zilha with her friend, singer Lepa Lukić. After that she recorded a song called "Sedam godina ljubavi" (Seven Years of Love). She and her husband were believed to have divorced, although many years later, Radmilo revealed that they had separated but stayed legally married until her death.

Zilha was an ethnic Muslim and her husband Radmilo was a Serb, making theirs an ethnically mixed marriage in multiethnic Yugoslavia. Radmilo's mother Gordana disapproved of the marriage as did Zilha's father Mehmed who even refused to speak to his daughter. In fact, Zilha was not allowed into his home until his death in 1965, when she returned to Doboj for his funeral.

After her marriage ended, many men vied for her affection, including politicians Stane Dolanc and Branko Pešić.

== Career ==
=== Career beginnings ===
Sometime in 1953, a young Zilha was heard singing in a Doboj kafana by Aca Stepić, and it was a voice he did not forget. They met again six years later in 1959, at the Hotel Bristol in Belgrade, after she started singing professionally. She was performing with the orchestra of Jovica Marinović and the singer/drummer was Cune Gojković. After that, she began singing with Aca in the Grand Casino in Belgrade, where she met her future husband Radmilo.

Zilha moved to Sarajevo at the age of sixteen in 1954, where she lived with her aunt and sang in local kafanas for money. One night Zilha met accordionist Ismet Alajbegović Šerbo in the Sarajevo suburb of Ilidža. Delighted with her voice, he wanted to make her part of his orchestra, but the girl was underage and needed her parents permission. Of course, they gave consent and Šerbo promised her that she would have food, a place to stay and a salary of 20,000 dinars monthly. There, she entered the professional world of showbusiness.

On a cold night in Leskovac in spring 1958, Zilha was taking walk through a park before a performance at the garden of a restaurant called Hisar in a hotel, when she saw a young man sleeping on a bench. It was Toma Zdravković. She approached him, woke him up, sat down and started a conversation. She asked him "Where are you from? What do you do?". He told her he was from a village, and had come to the city looking for a job. He couldn't find a job, and was broke with no way to pay his fare back home. Zilha wished to help him. She brought him to her performance, even handing her microphone over to him at one point.

When she heard Toma sing, she was amazed, according to Za društvo u ćošku, written by Aleksandar Gajović, a journalist and cultural worker. She begged the manager of the hotel to help Toma find a job. Toma began singing with her, and later she got him his own record deal and he began recording and touring on his own. The two became legends of the former Yugoslavia.

=== Stage name ===
Eventually she moved to Belgrade, the capital of Yugoslavia, to further her singing career. There she adopted the mononymous stage name "Silvana" after the Italian actress Silvana Mangano. When she was a young girl, her friends would jokingly call her Silvana after watching the film Bitter Rice (1949), because she resembled the actress.

=== 1965–69: First recordings and television ===
While in Belgrade, Silvana frequently performed in the bohemian neighborhood Skadarlija. During this time, she was offered several recording contracts from the incredibly competitive Yugoslav record labels. The first song she ever recorded was the Bosnian sevdalinka "Nad izvorom vrba se nadvila" (Over the Spring, the Willow Tree Hung), although it wasn't officially released until her 1968 album Otiš'o si bez pozdrava (You Left Without Saying Goodbye), three years after her first album was released. After recording a single record for the label Diskos in Aleksandrovac, she was invited by the label PGP-RTB to record in the then-popular duet format. Silvana recorded duet albums with singers Petar Tanasijević, Aleksandar Trandafilović, Slavko Perović and Dragan Živković in the 1960s. After both companies competitively issued her records for a period of time, Silvana grew "tired" of singing in duets. The opportunity to record as a soloist came from the Zagreb-based record label Jugoton.

Her career had taken off rapidly and she became one of the biggest commercial folk stars in Yugoslavia. This led to numerous and well-publicized country-wide singing engagements. She also appeared in many popular TV sitcoms such as Ljubav na seoski način (Love in the Rural Way) with famous Serbian comedian Miodrag Petrović Čkalja and folksy movies such as Građani sela Luga (Citizens of the Village Luga).

=== 1969–76: "Šta će mi život" and The Deer Hunt ===
In 1969, she and singer Toma Zdravković sang in the same group, and Zdravković wrote her biggest hit "Šta će mi život, bez tebe dragi" (What Do I Need a Life for, Without You Darling):

...While touring, we ran into one another a lot in different towns all over Yugoslavia, and in 1969, we even sang in the same band. I was already a well known and sought-after composer. She was completely down. She was constantly depressed and wanted me to write a song for her. But I didn't really know what. All of my songs were inspired by women I fancied and love-life, but we were good ol' friends. I had no inspiration. Until one day, I went drinking with my friends, we were drunk for three days straight, and the fourth day I woke up at a hotel, went down to the lounge, ordered a cup of coffee and just like that while getting over a hangover, I wrote "Šta će mi život". I recorded the song in the studio and wanted to use it for a festival coming up, but when she heard it, she wanted to have it. And what could I do? It was her song, inspired by her life, and her problems. I gave her the song and it was a bingo. I wish I had never written it. She died seven years later, it was like the song came true. It would have been better if she had never recorded that song. It would have been better if she had never become famous. She might still be alive...

The song became one of the biggest folk hits ever written in Yugoslavia, sold over 300,000 copies, and transformed Zdravković and Silvana herself into superstars. But Silvana's life ironically ended seven years later.

In a March 1971 interview with the newspaper Novosti, Silvana did not hide the fact that the same rejection and criticism that she faced at the start of her career, continued well into her successful days.

She co-starred in 1972 film The Deer Hunt with Boris Dvornik, Ivo Serdar and Miha Baloh, among others. The film was written and directed by Fadil Hadžić.

On a Belgrade-based television New Year's Eve program awaiting the year 1972, the director Dejan Karaklajić suggested Silvana to dress in a bikini and jump in a pool to resemble Hollywood actress Esther Williams. She initially refused and did not like the way her body looked in the swimsuit but was forced to do it as the sponsors had paid 13 million dinars. She cried and then agreed to appear on the program, but not in the swimsuit and refused to swim in a pool. The stunt sparked outrage among her fan base, who were not used to seeing her sexualize herself. She was also banned from all Yugoslav television for refusing to follow orders.

Throughout the 1970s and leading up to her death in 1976, she had several hit songs: "Rane moje" (My Wounds), "Ciganine, sviraj sviraj" (Gypsy, Play Play), "Srce gori, jer te voli" (My Heart Burns, For It Loves You), "Grli me, ljubi me" (Hug Me, Kiss Me), "Ja nemam prava nikoga da volim" (I Have No Right to Love Anyone), "Srećo moja" (Happiness of Mine), "Kišo, kišo tiho padaj" (Rain, Rain, Fall Quietly) and "Život teče" (Life Flows).

As she became more popular in Yugoslavia, she often performed for the President Josip Broz Tito and the First Lady Jovanka Broz. She was friends with many communist politicians including Branko Mikulić, Hamdija Pozderac and Džemal Bijedić. During a radio interview in Sarajevo in 1973, she stated that she was a fan of fellow sevdalinka singer Safet Isović and called him a "darling."

== Death ==
=== Before death ===
After Armenulić's death, friends said that she often worried about her fate. In October 1971, she was in a car accident that almost claimed her life, and which irresistibly recalls the tragedy that took her life five years later. Three months after the accident, she said, "I am a big pessimist. I'm afraid of life. The future. What will happen tomorrow. I fear that, for me, there might not even be a tomorrow...."

In the final few years of her life, Armenulić became increasingly obsessed with learning her own fate, so much so that she learned all she could about astrology, telepathy, and spoke with self-proclaimed prophets. In early August 1976, just two months before her death, she was on tour in Bulgaria and decided to seize the opportunity to meet with mystic Baba Vanga. The meeting was unpleasant. Vanga, who was blind, only sat and stared out a window with her back to Armenulić. She did not speak. After a long time, Vanga finally spoke: "Nothing. You do not have to pay. I do not want to speak with you. Not now. Go and come back in three months." As Armenulić turned around and walked towards the door, Vanga said: "Wait. In fact, you will not be able to come. Go, go. If you can come back in three months, do so." She took this as confirmation that she would die and left Vanga's home in tears.

Armenulić and her younger sister Mirsada Bajraktarević were at the opening of restaurant called "Lenin Bar" on 9 October 1976, the day before their deaths. Since the interior of the restaurant was meant to resemble a cave, there were spikes in the shape of stalactites hanging from the ceiling. Armenulić hit her head on one when getting up from her chair, which caused huge headache the rest of that day and the next.

=== Death and funeral ===
On Sunday, 10 October 1976, at around 9:15 pm CEST, Armenulić died in a car crash near the Serbian village of Kolari in Smederevo along with her 25-year-old pregnant sister Mirsada and violinist/Radio Belgrade folk orchestra conductor Miodrag "Rade" Jašarević. They were driving in a Ford Granada car en route from Aleksandrovac to Belgrade after a concert. Armenulić was behind the wheel when they left, but sometime between their departure and the crash, 60-year-old Jašarević had taken the wheel.

Their car was reportedly traveling 130 km/h, when it veered into oncoming traffic lanes at the 60th kilometer of the Belgrade—Niš highway, colliding head-on with a FAP truck driven by 52-year-old Rastko Grujić. Armenulić had been sleeping in the passenger's side seat and her younger sister was asleep in the back seat.

Initially, only the death of Jašarević was reported, as television shows refused to mention Armenulić because of the 1972 incident during a live broadcast on New Year's Eve show, which got her banned from television. The exact cause of the accident is unknown, but it is believed that the crash is directly related to a brake problem. The Ford Granada they were driving was recalled for "dangerous structural defects observed in the control mechanism". A notification was sent to all customers that the models manufactured between September 1975 and June 1976 were faulty. Owners were advised to return the cars; further details regarding these events remained obscure.

Between 30,000 and 50,000 people attended their funeral, including singers Lepa Lukić and Hašim Kučuk Hoki (who himself died in a near-identical car crash on 26 November 2002). She and her sister were buried side by side in the cemetery Novo groblje.

=== 1976–2026: Aftermath ===
The singer Lepa Lukić has said that she was asked to perform at the concert that day but overslept for the first time in her career and did not make it to the concert; she later stated that she believes, had she gone with them, she would have lost her life in the crash with the sisters. In 2013, Lepa revealed in an interview that she hasn't driven a car since the sisters' deaths, out of fear that she would share their fate.

During the war in Bosnia of the 1990s, Armenulić's mother Hajrija and sister Dina fled their home in Doboj to Denmark. In 2004, Hajrija (by then nearly 88 years old), filed a lawsuit against her former son-in-law and Armenulić's ex-husband Radmilo Armenulić, the suit alleged that the six-bedroom apartment in which he lived with his second wife, belonged to the Bajraktarević family. She said that Armenulić bought the apartment after she divorced Radmilo and planned on living there with her daughter Gordana, but shortly thereafter lost her life. Radmilo commented to the press, that he was still legally married to Armenulić up until her death and alleged that the apartment was left to their daughter Gordana. After Silvana's death, Radmilo got custody of the then twelve-year-old girl, and being her legal guardian, owned the apartment.

Silvana's mother Hajrija lived into her 90s, dying in 2008. Five years after their mother's death, Silvana's oldest sister Ševka died on 30 September 2013 in Trebinje at the age of 79, leaving Dina the last living of the female Bajraktarević children.

In a 2013 interview, her former husband Radmilo stated he still visits her grave and always leaves fresh flowers. He also said that Silvana's friend Predrag Živković Tozovac visited her grave frequently until his death in 2021.

=== Legacy ===
Fellow Yugoslavian singer Lepa Brena has twice covered Armenulić's songs; in 1995 she covered "Šta će mi život" for her album Kazna Božija, and in 2013 she covered "Ciganine ti što sviraš" on Izvorne i novokomponovane narodne pesme. Although Silvana and Brena never met (Brena's career started a few years after Silvana's death), they did have a mutual acquaintance: their manager Milovan Ilić Minimaks.

On 10 October 2011, the 35th anniversary of her death, Exploziv, a show on Serbian television channel Prva Srpska Televizija, included a ten-minute segment in which they interviewed some of Armenulić's surviving friends and her daughter, Gordana. The segment also included a reenactment of the car crash.

Serb writer Dragan Marković released a biography about her life entitled Knjiga o Silvani (Book About Silvana) on 9 December 2011. Silvana's daughter Gordana was among the people interviewed for the book.

Another biography about her, titled Silvana, was published in December 2023.

== Discography ==
=== Albums and singles ===
Tracks	Released
Voljesmo se zlato moje with Petar Tanasijević: 1. Voljesmo se zlato moje 2. Karanfile cvijeće šareno 3. Otiš'o si dragi 4. U suzama svi su dani	November 1965
Da li čuješ, dragi with Kruna Janković: 1. Da li čuješ, dragi 2. Povetarac jutros se pikrao 3. Noći tamna 4. Da li pamtiš, zlato moje	November 1965
Bez tebe mi život pust i prazan: 1. Bez tebe mi život pust i prazan 2. Zašto te nema da dođeš 3. Svake noći ja zaborav tražim 4. Zašto ode da mi srce pati	21 June 1966
Nisam više, nano, djevojčica: 1. Nisam više, nano, djevojčica 2. Zašto sumnjaš, dragi 3. Zašto moraš ti da odeš 4. Zbog rastanka plaču oči	5 October 1966
Nikom neću reći da te volim with Petar Tanasijević: 1. Nikom neću reći da te volim 2. Pitala me zvijezda sjajna 3. Ništa lijepše od prve ljubavi 4. Otiš'o si bez pozdrava	10 October 1966
Volesmo se zlato moje with Petar Tanasijević: 1. Volesmo se zlato moje 2. Karanfile cvijeće šareno 3. Otiš'o si dragi 4. U suzama svi su dani	1966
Djevojke smo sa Morave with Petar Tanasijević: 1. Djevojke smo sa Morave; 2. Znaš li dušo 3. Da l' još, dragi, ljubav čuvaš 4. Svake noći tebe čekam	10 November 1966
Krčmarice, daj mi vina with Slavko Perović: 1. Krčmarice, daj mi vina 2. Kada smo se sreli prvi put 3. Katerina; 4. Dođi, neznanko draga	23 January 1967
Kad jednom odem: 1. Kad jednom odem 2. Najlijepša sam djevojčica bila 3. Za tebe pjevam ovu pjesmu 4. U večeri kad se dan smiruje	14 February 1967
Mujo šalje haber sa mjeseca with Aleksandar Trandafilović: 1. Mujo šalje haber sa mjeseca 2. Sejdefu majka buđaše 3. A što ti je, mila kćeri, jelek raskopčan 4. Ima dana kada ne znam šta da radim	11 May 1967
Od djevojke ništa draže with Dragan Živković: 1. Od djevojke ništa draže 2. Što te nema moj jarane 3. Zaigraj kolo moje šareno 4. Djevojčice garava	1967
Naj – najlijepši: 1. Naj – najlijepši 2. Sama u svome bolu 3. Ne vjeruj u priče te 4. Tebe sam voljela	17 June 1968
Otiš'o si bez pozdrava: 1. Otiš'o si bez pozdrava 2. Kad ja pođem niz sokak 3. Nad izvorom vrba se nadnela 4. Ljubavi, vrati se	25 December 1968
Monja / Nad ozvorom vrba se nadnela with The Montenegro Five: 1. Monja (sung by The Montenegro Five); 2. Nad ozvorom vrba se nadnela (sung by Silvana Armenulić)	1969
Daruj mi noć, daruj mi tren / Kap ljubavi: 1. Daruj mi noć, daruj mi tren 2. Kap ljubavi	21 July 1969
Majko, oprosti mi: 1. Majko, oprosti mi 2. Sumorna jesen 3. Dala sam ti mladost 4. Sedam godina ljubavi	17 November 1969
Šta će mi život: 1. Šta će mi život 2. Kišo, kišo tiho padaj 3. Srećo moja 4. Ja nemam prava nikoga da volim	6 August 1970
Ostavite tugu moju / Život teče: 1. Ostavite tugu moju 2. Život teče	7 August 1970
Ženidba i ljubav: Side A: Ženidba; 1. Dijalog Paun – Milorad; 2. Milorad i Silvana pjevaju u duetu kompoziciju iz špice 3. Dijalog Paun – Živka; Side B: Ljubav; 1. Oj ljubavi, da te nije bilo 2. Duet Milorad – Silvana; 3. Dijalog Živka – Milorad	2 November 1970
Život teče with Arsen Dedić: 1. Život teče (sung by Silvana Armenulić); 2. Sve bilo je muzika (sung by Arsen Dedić)	4 November 1970
Ja molim za ljubav / Rane moje: 1. Ja molim za ljubav 2. Rane moje	15 June 1971
Majko oprosti: 1. Majko oprosti 2. Najlijepša sam djevojčica bila 3. Srećo moja 4. Daruj mi noć, daruj mi tren 5. Otiš'o si bez pozdrava 6. Šta ce mi život 7. Nad izvorom vrba se nadnela 8. Kad ja pođem niz sokak 9. Ja nemam prava nikoga da volim 10. Ostavite tugu moju 11. Kad jednom odem 12. Život teče	16 June 1971
Jugo, moja Jugo / Kad se vratim u zavičaj: 1. Jugo, moja Jugo; 2. Kad se vratim u zavičaj	27 September 1971
Grli me, ljubi me: 1. Grli me, ljubi me 2. Vrati se, vrati se	16 June 1972
Srce gori, jer te voli: 1. Srce gori, jer te voli 2. Živi život svoj	12 September 1972
Željna sam rodnog doma / A što ćemo ljubav kriti: 1. Željna sam rodnog doma 2. A što ćemo ljubav kriti	6 July 1973
Gdje si da si moj golube / Kad u jesen lišće žuti with Predrag Gojković Cune: 1. Gdje si da si moj golube 2. Kad u jesen lišće žuti	6 July 1973
Sama sam / Ciganine, sviraj sviraj: 1. Sama sam 2. Ciganine, sviraj sviraj	1 October 1973
Zaplakaće stara majka / Pamtiću uvijek tebe: 1. Zaplakaće stara majka 2. Pamtiću uvijek tebe	12 November 1974
Da sam ptica: 1. Da sam ptica 2. S' one strane Plive; 3. Oj ljubavi, da te nije bilo 4. Rumena mi ruža procvala 5. Srce gori, jer te voli 6. Grli me, ljubi me 7. Pjesma rastanka 8. Idem kući a vec zora 9. Lazni snovi, vječna tuga 10. Zvuk gitare 11. Živi život svoj 12. Kapetan Leši	10 December 1974
Dani naše mladosti: 1. Dani naše mladosti 2. Bolujem ja, boluješ ti	21 November 1975
Dušo moja: 1. Dušo moja 2. Godine su prošle, život želje mjenja	4 June 1976
Ludujem za tobom / Ne sjećaj se više mene: 1. Ludujem za tobom 2. Ne sjećaj se više mene	2 November 1976
Golube, poleti: 1. Golube, poleti 2. Nad izvorom vrba se nadnela 3. Zaplakaće stara majka 4. A što će mo ljubav kriti 5. Sama sam 6. Rane moje 7. Niz polje idu babo Sejmeni; 8. Dušo moja 9. Ludujem za tobom 10. Srce gori, jer te voli	7 December 1976
Sačuvali smo od zborava: 1. Šta ce mi život 2. Majko, oprosti 3. Sama sam 4. Ostavite tugu moju 5. Rane moje 6. Grli me, ljubi me 7. Ciganine, sviraj, sviraj 8. Da sam ptica 9. Srce gori, jer te voli 10. Srećo moja 11. Ludujem za tobom 12. Najlijepša sam djevojčica bila	12 April 1983
Silvana: 1. Zapjevala sojka ptica 2. Sinoć ja i moja kona 3. Snijeg pade, drumi zapadoše 4. Teško meni jadnoj, u Saraj'vu samoj 5. Zvijezda tjera mjeseca 6. Vrbas voda nosila jablana 7. Kraj potoka bistre vode 8. Moj dilbere 9. Djevojka viče 10. Nad izvorom vrba se nadnela	1990 (re-released 1996)
Hitovi: 1. Zvijezda tjera mjeseca 2. Kad ja pođem niz sokak 3. Ljubavi vrati se 4. Kišo, kišo tiho padaj 5. Sinoć ja i moja kona 6. Moj dilbere 7. Zapjevala sojka ptica 8. Snijeg pade, drumi zapadoše 9. Kraj potoka bistre vode 10. Lažni snovi, vječna tuga 11. Što ti je mila kćeri jelek raskopčan 12. Ima dana kada ne znam šta radim 13. Rumena ruža mi procvala 14. Vrbas voda nosila jablana 15. Sejdefu majka buđaše 16. Teško meni jadnoj, u Saraj'vu samoj 17. Otiš'o si bez pozdrava 18. Da sam ptica	2010

=== Other recorded songs ===
This is a list of songs recorded by Armenulić that were not released on any of her albums. They are mostly covers of centuries-old Bosnian sevdalinkas.

1. Aj, san zaspala
2. Bol boluje mlado momče
3. Bosa Mara Bosnu pregazila
4. Ciganka sam mala
5. Crven fesić
6. Djevojka je pod đulom zaspala
7. Djevojka viče s visoka brda
8. Đul Zulejha
9. Harmoniko moja
10. Igrali se konji vrani
11. Ko se ono brijegom šeće?
12. Mene moja zaklinjala majka
13. San zaspala
14. Simbil cvijeće
15. Sinoć dođe tuđe momče
16. Svi dilberi, samo moga nema
17. Ti nikad nisi htio znati
18. Vrbas voda nosila jablana

== Filmography ==
=== Film ===
- The Deer Hunt (1972)
- Saniteks (1973); short film

=== Television ===
- Ljubav na seoski način ("Love in the Rural Way", 1970); 4 episodes
- Milorade, kam bek (1970); TV film
- Građani sela Luga ("Citizens of the Village Lug", 1972); 2 episodes
- Koncert za komšije ("Concert for the Neighbors", 1972); TV film

== See also ==
- List of people who died in road accidents
- Mirsada Mirjana Bajraktarević
- Dina Bajraktarević
