= Nada Topčagić =

Bosnian folk singer (born 1953)

Nada Topčagić Нада Топчагић
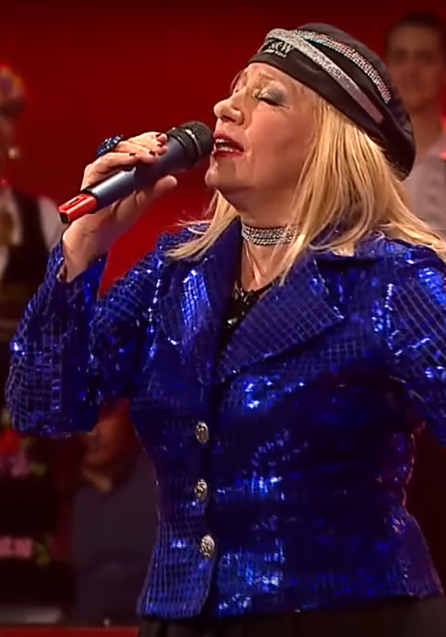
- Topčagić performing in 2018

Background information
- Born: Nada Topčagić; 3 July 1953 (age 72); Modriča, PR Bosnia and Herzegovina, FPR Yugoslavia
- Genres: Folk
- Occupation: Singer
- Instrument: Vocals
- Years active: 1975–present
- Labels: PGP-RTB; ZaM; Grand

Nada Topčagić (Serbian Cyrillic: Нада Топчагић; born 3 July 1953) is a Bosnian-Serbian folk singer.

== Life and career ==
=== Early life ===
Nada Topčagić was born on July 3, 1953, in Modriča, FPR Yugoslavia (modern-day Bosnia and Herzegovina) and was raised in the nearby village of Tarevci. While attending primary school, she also temporarily reside in Osijek. At the age of eighteen, Topčagić was discovered by the prominent producer and instrumentalist, Žika Radenković, who brought her to Belgrade so she can pursue a recording career.

=== Career ===
She debuted in 1975 with the single "Na Drini ćuprija", written by Obren Pjevović. Topčagić gained most success during the 80s with hits which include "Treba mi tvoje rame" (1982), "Zovem te, zovem" (1984), "Izvini, dušo izvini" (1985) and "Jutro je" (1989), which is arguably the greatest hit of hers. She has competed on eminent Yugoslavian music festivals such as Hit Parada, MESAM and Vogošća festival. Over the years Topčagić has released twenty studio albums and has maintained a career spanning over five decades.

During the Croatian War of Independence in the early 90s, Topčagić faced public scrutiny after she had performed alongside other singers for Serb soldiers in Vukovar a month after the city's fall. In 2022, she stated that they were forced to do so, explaining that she would not have done it, if she were to choose now.

In March 2021, she received saw widespread publicity when Swedish footballer Zlatan Ibrahimović, who is of Bosnian and Croatian descent, used a snippet of "Jutro je", at the Sanremo Music Festival.

She has been known for her often eccentric appearance, and has compared herself to Lady Gaga.

=== Personal life ===
Topčagić is married to former manager Zlatko Đurđević, with whom she has a son, named Miroslav (b. 1984). She also has two grandchildren.

== Discography ==
Studio albums

- Život je lep dok si mlad (1979)
- Stare dobre pesme (1980)
- Ja sam tvoja i ničija više (1981)
- Treba mi tvoje rame (1982)
- Pomozi mi (1983)
- Zovem te, zovem (1984)
- Želim te, želim (1985)
- Nežno, nežnije (1987)
- Na srcu mi ležiš (1988)
- Volela sam (1989)
- Koju igru igraš (1990)
- Sudba siroana (1992)
- Ljubomorna sam (1994)
- Nada Topčagić (1996)
- Nada Topčagić (1997)
- Nada Topčagić (1998)
- Nada Topčagić (2001)
- Nada Topčagić (2004)
- Nada Topčagić (2005)
- Nada Topčagić (2020)

EPs and singles

- Na Drini Ćuprija (1975)
- Postoji samo jedan čovek / Dva zlatna prstena (1976)
- Zaklanjaš mi Sunce (1977)

== Filmography ==
Television and film appearances of Nada Topčagić
Year	Title	Genre	Role	Notes
1981	Sok od šljiva	Film	Herself (singer)	
1984	Kamiondžije opet voze	Television	Herself (singer)	Episode 1
1984	Supermarket	Television	Herself (singer)	Episode 2
1986	Sekula i njegove žene	Television	Herself (singer)	
1993	Bolje od bekstva	Film	Herself (singer)	
