= Serbian folk music =

Musical genre

Serbian folk music (Serbian: српска народна музика / srpska narodna muzika) refers to, in the narrow sense, the "older" style of Serbian folk music, predating the "newer" (Serbian: новокомпонована / novokomponovana, "newly composed") style which emerged in the 1970s and 1980s as a result of urbanisation. The characteristic musical instruments included the accordion and violin, while traditional instruments such as tamburica, frula, were also used.

== Notable performers ==
Male

- Cune Gojković (1932–2017)
- Predrag Živković Tozovac (1936–2021)
- Miroslav Ilić (born 1950)
- Staniša Stošić (1945–2008)
- Sinan Sakić (1956–2018)
- Šaban Šaulić (1951–2019)
- Šeki Turković (born 1953)
- Marinko Rokvić (1954–2021)

Female

- Lepa Lukić (born 1940)
- Snežana Đurišić (born 1959)
- Merima Njegomir (1953–2021)
- Vasilija Radojčić (1936–2011)
- Brankica Vasić (Бранкица Васић), stage name Vasilisa
- Lepa Brena (born 1960)
- Zorica Brunclik (born 1955)

== Notable songs ==
- List of Serbian folk songs

== Notable concerts ==
- Tri majstora, December 1996, Radio Television of Serbia, (imdb)

== See also ==
- Starogradska muzika
- Serbian folklore
- Serbian dances
- Serbian culture
