= Jordan Nikolić =

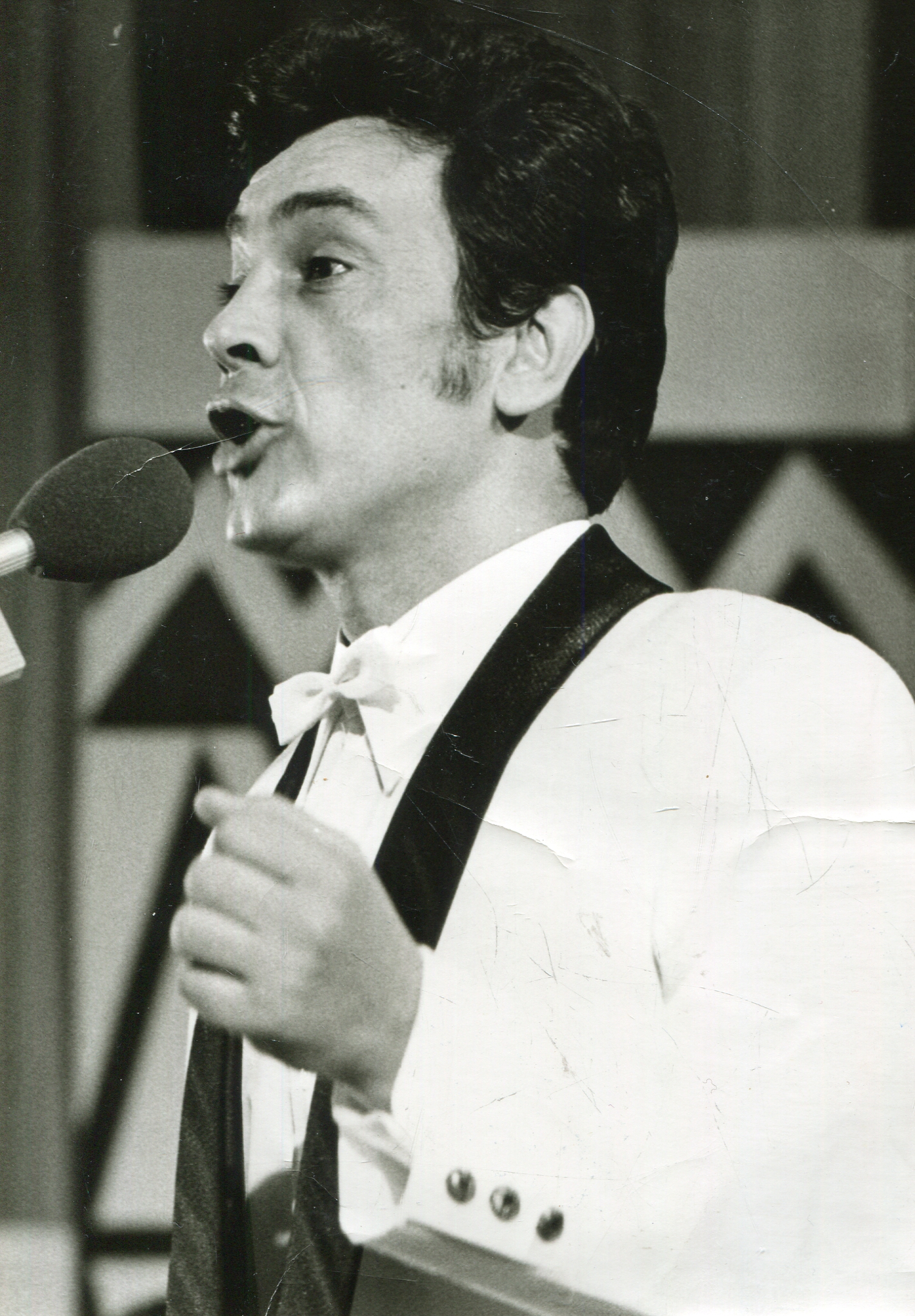

Background information
- Born: 11 May 1933; Prizren, Kingdom of Yugoslavia
- Died: 26 April 2018 (aged 84); Belgrade, Serbia
- Genres: Serbian traditional music
- Occupation: Singer
- Years active: 1961–2018

Jordan Nikolić (Serbian Cyrillic: Јордан Николић; 11 May 1933 – 26 April 2018) was a Serbian folk singer who interpreted traditional songs from Kosovo.

== Biography ==
Nikolić was born on 11 May 1933, in Prizren, Kingdom of Yugoslavia. His parents were born in Sredačka župa, from where they moved to Prizren. His father played the gusle. In primary school and in gymnasium, he was a member of the choir.

Jordan Nikolić graduated the Yugoslav literature and Serbian language at the Faculty of Philology in Belgrade. He found his interest while studying Serbian folk music in school. His first recording was made in 1961, in the Radio Pristina, and two years later he became the music editor of the same radio station. In 1968 he began recording for programs of Radio Belgrade, spreading the rich repertoire of Kosovo folk songs.

During a 50-year career, in cooperation with Mara Đorđević, Nikolić searched and saved from oblivion ancient songs from Kosovo and southern Serbia, some predating the Battle of Kosovo in 1389. About a hundred of his voice recordings are saved in Radio Belgrade archives.

Nikolić participated in Jugovizija (Yugoslavian Eurosong qualification contest) in 1976.

He died in Belgrade on 26 April 2018, aged 84.

== Awards ==
- Estradna nagrada Jugoslavije
- Estradna nagrada Srbije
- Majstorsko pismo grada Niš

== Discography ==
Singles:

- 1968 – Ovih dana reče meni Jana (feat. Danica Obrenić) (single)
- 1968 – Zašto nisam ptica (7", EP), 1968
- 1970 – Voli me još malo
- 1976 – Tvoje ruke su miran san

Albums and compilations:

- 1982 – Razgranala grana jorgovana, PGP RTB
- 1998 – Simbil cveće, PGP RTS
- 2007 – Zapisano u vremenu, PGP RTS (triple CD edition)
- 2009 – Srpske pesme sa Kosova, PGP RTS

== See also ==
Similar repertoire

- Vasilija Radojčić (1936–2011)
- Staniša Stošić (1945–2008)
- Teofilovići (born 1966)
