= Radmilo =

Radmilo (Cyrillic script: Радмило) is a masculine given name of Slavic origin. It may refer to:

- Radmilo Armenulić (born 1940), tennis coach and former tennis player
- Radmilo Ivančević, (born 1950), football manager and former footballer
- Radmilo Mihajlović (born 1964), footballer

== See also ==
- Radmilovac
- Radmilović
- Radmilovići
