= Obren Pjevović =

Obren Pjevović Обрен Пјевовић
- Born: 1919; Donja Gorevnica, Čačak, Kingdom of SHS
- Died: 4 January 1991; Mrčajevci, Čačak, Serbia, Yugoslavia
- Genres: Folk

Obren Pjevović (Serbian: Обрен Пјевовић; 1919 in Donja Gorevnica, Čačak, Kingdom of SHS – 4 January 1991 in Mrčajevci, Čačak, Serbia, Yugoslavia) was a Serbian songwriter and composer who wrote more than 170 songs, some of them part of the important cultural heritage of traditional Serbian folk songs of Šumadija.

== Family ==
The Pjevović family descend from the Rajović family from Montenegro. The Rajović family is named after their earliest known ancestor, Rajo. In the 18th century a branch of Rajović family moved from Montenegro to Prilike in Ottoman Serbia. At that time one of family members, Rajo Rajović was known as a good singer (Serbian: pjevač), so Ottomans referred to him as Pjevo. Ottoman subashi from Zlatibor often requested Pjevo to be brought to sing to his field workers, to encourage them to work better. Based on this nickname Pjevo's descendants adopted Pjevović last name.

Pjevović completed only four grades of elementary school. In 1941 he moved from Donja Gorevnica to Mrčajevci where he lived until his death in 1991.

== Popular songs ==
His most popular songs include:

- "Make me some coffee, my darling" (Serbian: Кафу ми драга испеци)
- "Where Are You From, Sis" (Serbian: Одакле си селе)
- "Morava's twilight" (Serbian: Моравско предвечерје)
- "I loved the girl from the city" (Serbian: Волео сам девојку из града).
- "Duga li je Jelica planina"
- "Oj, Moravo, tija reko"
- "Ej, da mi je"
- "Šumadija"
- "Mrčajevci"
- "Progovori sliko"
- "Sa Rudnika i Avale"
- "Duga li je Jelica planina"
- "Oj, Moravo daleko se slivaš"
- "Nek' me ne zaborave devojke sa Morave" (co-authored with Bora Đorđević)
- "Nemoj, Mile, Na Me Da Se Srdiš"
- "Zarudela Zora Na Moravi"

His songs were sung by many notable singers such as Miroslav Ilić, Predrag Gojković Cune, Olivera Katarina and Dobrivoje Topalović.

=== I loved the girl from the city ===
One of the most popular songs Pjevović composed was a famous folk song (authored by Dobrica Erić) "I loved the girl from the city" (Serbian: Волео сам девојку из града) that was the first hit song of Miroslav Ilić, a fellow country man of Pjevović. Pjevović first offered this song to Predrag Živković Tozovac and Predrag Gojković Cune, but they rejected it as non-commercial. In 1972, after several major record companies refused to publish, it Pjevović and Ilić accidentally, on their way to railway station in Belgrade, passed by representative office of Diskos record company and decided to try their luck with them. Although this song was not corresponding to contemporary modern trends, manager from Diskos decided to take a big personal risk and publish the song. Very soon it became one of the biggest hit folk songs in Belgrade and Serbia.
