= Dina Bajraktarević =

- Born: Hajrudina Bajraktarević; 19 March 1953 (age 72); Doboj, PR Bosnia and Herzegovina, FPR Yugoslavia
- Occupation: Singer
- Years active: 1977–87
- Musical career
- Genres: sevdalinka; folk
- Instrument: vocals
- Labels: Diskos

Hajrudina Bajraktarević Nikolić (born 19 March 1953), known professionally as Dina Bajraktarević, is a Bosnian former singer and the younger sister of Silvana Armenulić and Mirjana Bajraktarević. Both of her sisters died in a car crash in 1976.

== Early life and family ==
Hajrudina Bajraktarević was born in Doboj, PR Bosnia and Herzegovina, FPR Yugoslavia to a Muslim and ethnically Bosniak family with thirteen children. Her father was Mehmed Bajraktarević (1909–1966), owner of a local cake shop called Jagoda (Strawberry), and her mother was Hajrija (1916–2008). Hajrudina's sister Silvana (born Zilha) started singing at an early age, but their father, a local cake shop operator, was not supportive of her singing career.

Dina had a brother named Hajrudin who died about two weeks after being mauled by a dog in the 1940s. After her brothers death, her father found solace in alcohol and solitude, neglecting the family and his business. After her father's cake shop closed, the family suffered greatly. The family of thirteen children included sisters Hajrudina, Zilha (Silvana), Abida, Mirsada and Ševka, and brothers Hajrudin, Muhamed, Izudin, Abudin, and Ismet. Her oldest sister Ševka's son Sabahudin Bilalović became a professional basketball player who died aged 43 of a heart attack on the beach while swimming with his son. Ten years later, Ševka and her husband Lutvo both died of natural causes in September 2013, just days apart.

In 1955, Silvana moved to Sarajevo at the age of sixteen where she lived with her aunt and sang in local kafanas for money. She eventually landed a professional singing career which led way to sister Mirsada getting a record deal and recording her first album at the age of eighteen in 1969 and releasing it in 1970.

The singing sisters, Silvana and Mirsada, died together in a car crash on 10 October 1976 near the Serbian village Kolari. At the time, Mirsada, who was in the second term of her pregnancy, was sharing an apartment with Dina.

== Career ==
After her sisters deaths, Dina was approached to release an album. Hesitant to sing professionally at first, she ended up releasing three extended plays: one in 1978, 1979 and 1980. She had major success with the song "Sudbina je tako htjela" (Fate Wanted It That Way). She then took a break from music and had two sons, Silvano and Silvan, with her husband singer Žika Nikolić. Their sons Silvano and Silvan, named after Dina's late sister Silvana, are singers as well, although Silvano is not singing actively anymore, whilst Silvan is taking music to a professional level with his voice.

Bajraktarević made a return to music in 1987 with a full-length studio album, Dođi dragi ne dangubi (Come Dear, Do Not Waste Time). That was her final release before retiring from music.

== Later life ==
During the Bosnian War of the 1990s, Dina, together with her husband, sons and mother Hajrija fled their home in Doboj for Denmark. Mother Hajrija lived to the age of 91, dying in 2008. Five years after their mothers' death, Dina's oldest sister Ševka died on 30 September 2013 in Trebinje at the age of 79, leaving Dina the last living of the female Bajraktarević children.

== Discography ==
During her short career, Bajraktarević released three extended plays and one studio album:

Tracks	Released
Ja na tugu nemam prava / Sudbina je tako htjela: 1. Ja na tugu nemam prava (I Do Not Have a Right to Sadness); 2. Sudbina je tako htjela (Fate Wanted It That Way)	1978
Ti nikada nisi bio sam / Srce si mi zapalio: 1. Ti nikada nisi bio sam (You've Never Been Alone); 2. Srce si mi zapalio (You Set My Heart on Fire)	1979
Neću laži, hoću istinu: 1. Neću laži, hoću istinu (I Don't Want Lies, I Want the Truth); 2. Ubrala sam jabuku rumenu (I Picked a Ripe Apple)	1980
Dođi dragi ne dangubi: 1. Prva žena u Haremu (First Woman in the Harem); 2. Dođi dragi ne dangubi (Come Dear, Do Not Waste Time); 3. Ako se nekada rodiš (If You're Born One Day); 4. Moj Bosanac (My Bosnian Man); 5. Kaži mi s'agapo (Tell Me You Love Me); 6. Adam i Eva (Adam and Eve); 7. Lelo, dođi na poselo (Lelo, Come to the Party); 8. Voljeni ćuj (Beloved Call)	1987

== See also ==
- Silvana Armenulić
- Mirjana Bajraktarević
