= Mirjana Bajraktarević =

Musical artist (1951–1976)

- Born: Mirsada Bajraktarević; 23 April 1951; Doboj, PR Bosnia and Herzegovina, Yugoslavia
- Died: 10 October 1976 (aged 25); Kolari, SR Serbia, Yugoslavia
- Occupation: Singer-songwriter
- Years active: 1969–76
- Spouse: Zoran Milivojević (m. 1973; div. 1974)
- Musical career
- Genres: Sevdalinka; folk
- Instrument: Vocals

Mirsada Bajraktarević (23 April 1951 – 10 October 1976), known professionally as Mirjana Bajraktarević, was a Bosnian sevdalinka singer and songwriter. She was the sister of Silvana Armenulić and Dina Bajraktarević. Mirjana and Silvana died in a car crash.

Her career reached its peak in 1974 with the songs "Doletjeće bijeli golub" and "Ne zovi me, ja ti neću doći". The year after her death, she had a posthumous hit single when "Rukama sam mahala za tobom" was released.

== Early life and family ==
Mirsada Bajraktarević was born in the Bosnian city of Doboj, the seventh of thirteen children, to a Muslim and ethnically Bosniak family. Her father was Mehmed Bajraktarević (1909–1966), owner of a local cake shop called Jagoda (Strawberry), and her mother was Hajrija (1916–2008).

The family surname has its origins in the Ottoman Empire; bajrak is the Turkish word for flag. Mirsada's sister Zilha began singing at an early age, but their father was not supportive of her singing career.

Mirsada had a brother named Hajrudin who died about two weeks after being mauled by a dog in the 1940s. After her brother's death, her father found solace in alcohol and solitude, neglecting the family and his business. After her father's cake shop closed, the family suffered greatly. The family of thirteen children included sisters Mirsada, Hajrudina (Dina), Zilha (Silvana), Abida, and Ševka, and brothers Hajrudin, Muhamed, Izudin, Abudin, and Ismet. Her nephew Sabahudin Bilalović became a professional basketball player who died at age 43 of a heart attack on the beach while swimming with his son. Ten years later, Ševka and her husband Lutvo both died of natural causes in September 2013, just days apart.

== Career ==
In 1955, Silvana moved to Sarajevo at the age of sixteen where she lived with their aunt and sang in local kafanas for money. She eventually landed a professional singing career which led way to Mirsada getting a record deal and recording her first album at the age of eighteen in 1969 and releasing it on 18 February 1970.

In 1975, after five years of releasing extended plays and singles, Bajraktarević released her first full-length studio album, Imala sam drugaricu (I Had a Friend). The album contained a dozen songs, two of which were written by Bajraktarević herself. Four of the songs were written by Radoslav Graić, including the title song which became a hit. She also covered four Bosnian folk songs; "Kraj potoka bistre vode" (By a Stream of Crystal Clear Water), "Ah, moj Aljo, crne oči" (Oh, My Aljo, with Your Black Eyes), "Moj zumbule" (My Hyacinth), "Mujo kuje konja" (Mujo Shoes the Horse.)

== Personal life ==
According to an interview with one of Mirsada's friends, she was married for about a year to Yugoslav singer Zoran Milivojević (died 13 March 2011).

== Death and aftermath ==
On 10 October 1976, at around 9:15 pm CEST, Mirsada died in a car crash near the Serbian village of Kolari in Smederevo along with her sister Silvana Armenulić and violinist/Radio Belgrade folk orchestra conductor Miodrag "Rade" Jašarević. They were driving in a Ford Granada car from Aleksandrovac to Belgrade after a concert.

Originally, Silvana was to drive with Mirsada sitting in the passenger's seat; then Montenegrin singer Ljubomir Đurović asked if he could drive to Belgrade with them. As he was putting his bags into the car, Rade Jašarević asked the sisters if he could drive with them to Belgrade because all the other singers who had performed in the concert that day were watching a soccer game of Spain versus Yugoslavia. Đurović had forgotten about the game; he asked the sisters if they wanted to stay to watch the game, then all drive back to Belgrade when the game ended. The sisters refused as they were both tired and Silvana had a severe headache after hitting her head in the restaurant the day before. Đurović decided to stay and drive back to Belgrade in Boki Milošević's Volvo after the game.

Silvana was behind the wheel when they left, but sometime between their departure and the crash, 60-year-old Jašarević had taken the wheel.

The car was reportedly travelling 130 km/h (81 mph), when it collided with a FAP truck driven by 52-year-old Rastko Grujić. Bajraktarević had fallen asleep in the back seat and older sister was asleep in the passengers' side seat. The singer Lepa Lukić was asked to perform at the concert that day but overslept for the first time in her career and did not make it to the concert; she later stated that she believes, had she gone with them, she would have lost her life in the crash with the sisters. In 2013, Lepa revealed in an interview that she hasn't driven a car since the sisters' deaths, out of fear that she would share their fate. Between 30,000 and 50,000 people attended their funeral, including singers Lepa Lukić and Hašim Kučuk Hoki (who himself died in a near-identical car crash on 26 November 2002.) She and her sister were buried side by side in the cemetery Novo groblje. Initially, only the death of Jašarević was reported, as television shows refused to mention Silvana because of a 1972 incident during a live broadcast on New Year's Eve show, which got her banned from all television. The exact cause of the accident is unknown, but it is believed that the crash is directly related to a brake problem. The Ford Granada they were driving was recalled for "dangerous structural defects observed in the control mechanism". A notification was sent to all customers that the models manufactured between September 1975 and June 1976 were faulty. Owners were advised to return the cars. It is not known if Silvana and Mirsada were aware of the recall, and just opted to not return the car, or if she was completely unaware.

At the time of her death, Mirsada was sharing an apartment with her sister Dina and was in the sixth month of her pregnancy. She was also engaged to be married to a boxer named Dragomir Vujković from Zenica. She met him in 1975 and they planned to marry at the end of November 1976 after she returned from a tour with her sister in Australia.

Mirsada's mother Hajrija lived to be 92 years old, dying in 2008. Five years after their mothers' death, Mirsada's oldest sister Ševka died on 30 September 2013 in Trebinje at the age of 79, leaving Dina the last living of the female Bajraktarević children.

== Discography ==
The following are studio albums, singles and EPs released by Mirsada between 1970 and 1976, with two posthumous EPs released in 1977:

| Tracks | Released |
|---|---|
| Zašto da duša pati / Vrati se: 1. Zašto da duša pati 2. Vrati se | 18 February 1970 |
| Zašto da budem rob ljubavi: 1. Zašto da budem rob ljubavi 2. Ljubavi, ljubavi 3. Ako se ikad rastanemo 4. Varala sam, varala | 1970 |
| Pokraj Bosne hladne: 1. Pokraj Bosne hladne | 1971 |
| Pamtiš li ljubav: 1. Pamtiš li ljubav 2. Zauvijek | 1972 |
| Pamtiću uvijek tebe: 1. Pamtiću uvijek tebe 2. Kletva jedne žene | 1973 |
| Ne traži me: 1. Ne traži me 2. Goro, sestro rođena | 29 August 1973 |
| Dođi, dođi željo moja: 1. Dođi, dođi željo moja 2. Moj delija | 27 February 1974 |
| Ljubavi, ljubavi, sudbino sreće: 1. Ljubavi, ljubavi, sudbino sreće 2. Doletjeće bijeli golub | 3 July 1974 |
| Ne sjećaj se mene više: 1. Ne sjećaj se mene više 2. Ne zovi me, ja ti neću doći | December 1974 |
| Samo njega sanjam: 1. Samo njega sanjam 2. Jesen je moje najljepše doba | 5 February 1975 |
| Imala sam drugaricu: 1. Imala sam drugaricu 2. Doletjeće bijeli golub 3. Samo njega sanjam 4. Ne sjećaj se mene više 5. Ne zovi me ja ti neću doći 6. Pjesma o našoj ljubavi 7. Kraj potoka bistre vode 8. Ah, moj Aljo, crne oči 9. Moj zumbule 10. Mujo kuje 11. Dođi, dođi željo moja 12. Moj delija | 1975 |
| Imala sam drugaricu / Pjesma o našoj ljubavi: 1. Imala sam drugaricu 2. Pjesma o našoj ljubavi | 4 December 1975 |
| Krenuli smo istom stazom: 1. Krenuli smo istom stazom 2. Neću da tugujem | 11 March 1976 |
| Noćas jednoj ženi lako nije: 1. Noćas jednoj ženi lako nije 2. Odavno si otišao sine | 20 October 1976 |
| Rukama sam mahala za tobom: 1. Rukama sam mahala za tobom 2. Bio si zora života moga | 26 May 1977 |

Other recorded songs

1. Bosno moja, divna, mila

== See also ==
- List of people who died in road accidents
- Silvana Armenulić
- Dina Bajraktarević
