= Topčagić =

Topčagić is a Bosnian Muslim surname, derived from the Turkism of topčaga, meaning "commander of an artillery unit". It may refer to:

- Mihret Topčagić (born 1988), Austrian footballer, born in Gračanica
- Mustafa Topčagić (fl. 1941–42), Ustasha sympathizer, geometrician from Visoko
- Nada Topčagić (born 1953), Serbian singer, born in Modriča
