= Mrčajevci =

- Village
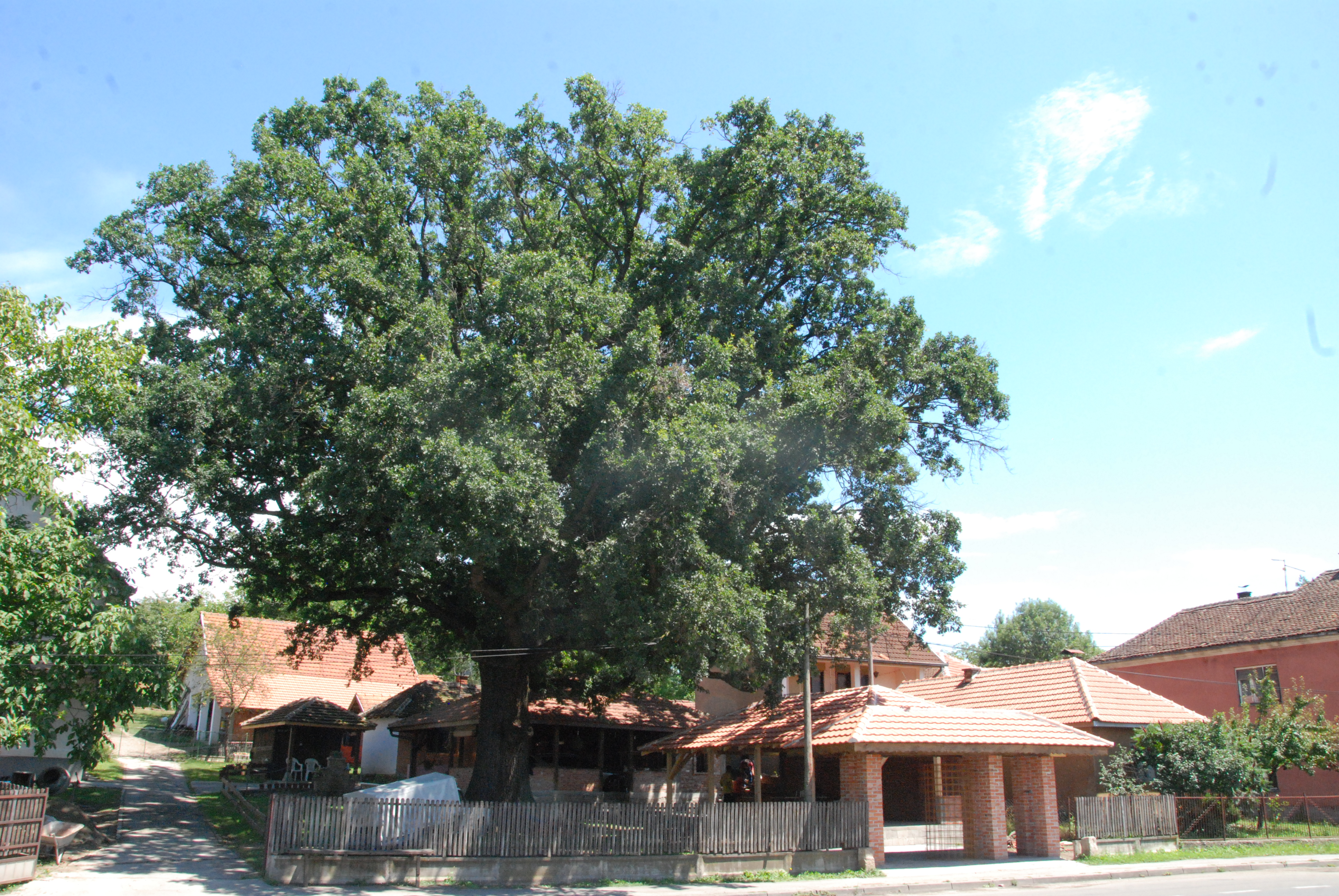
- Oak of Timotijević in Mrčajevci

- Location within Serbia
- Coordinates: 43°52′03″N 20°31′46″E
- Country: Serbia
- District: Moravica District
- Municipality: Čačak

Area
  - Total: 23.25 km^{2} (8.98 sq mi)
- Elevation: 214 m (702 ft)

Population (2011)
  - Total: 2,767
  - Density: 119.0/km^{2} (308.2/sq mi)
- Time zone: UTC+1 (CET)
  - Summer (DST): UTC+2 (CEST)

Mrčajevci (Serbian Cyrillic: Мрчајевци, pronounced [mř̩tʃaje(ː)ʋtsi]) is a village in the city of Čačak, Serbia. It is located in Central Serbian region of Šumadija.

According to the 2011 census, the village has a population of 2,767 inhabitants.

Excavations of pre-historic tumuli has been unearthed in the village.

== See also ==
- Miroslav Ilić
- Obren Pjevović
- Tatomir Anđelić
