= Radmilović =

Radmilović may refer to:

- Radmilović, Knić, a village in Serbia
- Paul Radmilovic, British swimmer and water polo player
- Stanko Radmilović (1989–1991), Prime Minister of Serbia
- Zoran Radmilović, Serbian actor
