= Staniša Stošić =

- Born: July 26, 1945; Vranje, SR Serbia, SFR Yugoslavia
- Died: April 7, 2008
- Genres: Serbian traditional music
- Occupation: Singer
- Years active: 1963–2008

Staniša Stošić (Станиша Стошић; July 26, 1945 – April 7, 2008) was a Serbian folk singer known for melodies from his home region of Vranje in Southern Serbia, which earned him the nickname of "Serbian Pavarotti" and "Father of the southern melodies". His most popular song was Lela Vranjanka.

== Biography ==
He was born July 26, 1945, in the village of Vrbovo near Vladičin Han.

He sang the first time in Radio Belgrade, 1963, and won the "Zlatiborski narcis" festival in 1966 with the song Stojanke, bela Vranjanke. Lela Vranjanka, a Serbian interpretation of "Miserlou" was recorded in 1972.

In 2007, he was awarded the Special Lifetime Award by the Serbian Ministry of Culture for his efforts on preserving Serbian music tradition.

== Albums ==
- Antologija vranjanskih narodnih pesama
- Moje najlepše pesme

== Songs ==
- "Žal za mladost"
- "Lela Vranjanka" (Dragan Toković)
- "Dimitrijo, sine Mitre"
- "Simbil cveće"
- "Zbog tebe, mome ubava"
- "Stani stani zoro"
- "Otvori mi belo lenče"
- "Šano dušo, Šano mori, otvori mi vrata

== See also ==
- Jordan Nikolić
