= Predrag Gojković Cune =

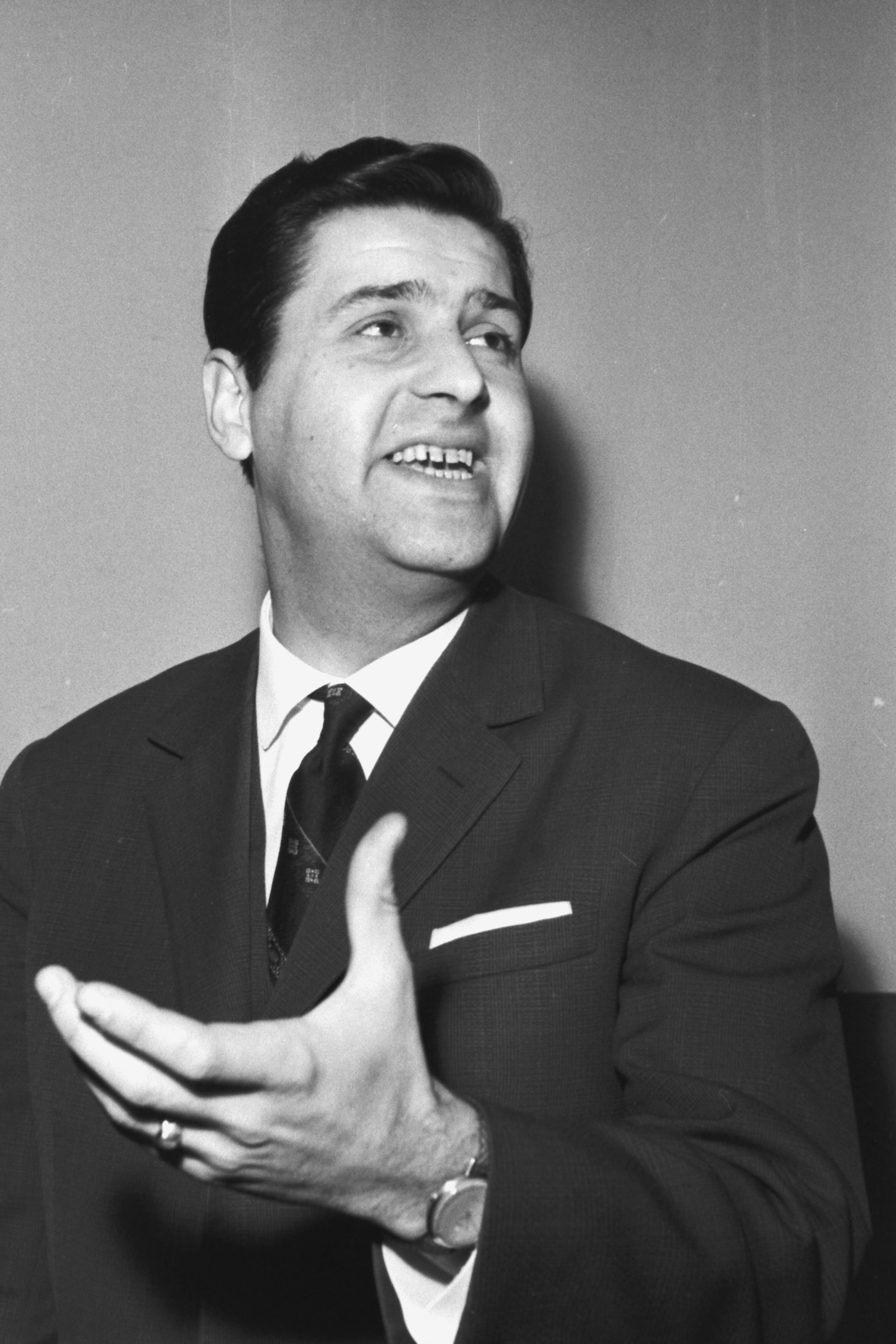
- Gojković in 1962

Background information
- Also known as: Cune (pronounced [tsûne])
- Born: Predrag Gojković; 6 November 1932; Kragujevac, Kingdom of Yugoslavia
- Died: 21 July 2017 (aged 84) Belgrade, Serbia
- Genres: Traditional, Pop-folk, Folk
- Occupation: Singer
- Years active: 1949–2015

Predrag Gojković (Serbian Cyrillic: Предраг Гојковић; 6 November 1932 – 21 July 2017), better known by his nickname Cune, was a Serbian vocalist and recording artist with a career spanning six decades.

== Biography ==
In 1939, he enrolled in primary school and subsequently enrolled in the 8th Men's Gymnasium in Belgrade, alongside actors Velimir Bata Živojinović and Danilo Bata Stojković. After high school, he attended the Trade Academy — which he never finished due to his love for singing.

Gojković performed in the late 1950s with Silvana Armenulić, accompanied by an orchestra. The two recorded an LP, released on 6 July 1973. The album featured two songs: "Gdje si da si moj golube" and "Kad u jesen lišće žuti". Gojković was awarded the Order of Merits for the People by the President of Yugoslavia, Josip Broz Tito.

By the early 2010s, Gojković began scaling back his performing schedule. In July 2010 he said: "performance anxiety is something I still have in abundance. I rarely sing and since the voice needs constant training, I'm simply not able to maintain the level that the audience is used to from me. Anxiety affects the quality of your voice, but my experience helps me overcome it". In November 2011, he added: "I want to calm down. I wish for my career to simply fade out without much spectacle".

On his 83rd birthday, he received RTS's "Golden Microphone" for "extraordinary contributions in the field of Serbia's culture with a brilliant talent spanning over six decades."

== Death ==
Gojković died on 21 July 2017, at age 84, in Belgrade. Many artists from all over the former Yugoslavia publicly gave condolences to the family and expressed grief over his death. The Minister of Culture of Serbia Vladan Vukosavljević expressed his grief via telegram to Predrag's family.

Gojković is interred in the Alley of Distinguished Citizens in the Belgrade New Cemetery.

== Discography ==
=== Albums ===
- 1961. Halisko (PGP RTB)
- 1973. Nestaćeš iz mog života (Jugoton)
- 1973. Cune (PGP RTB)
- 1975. Zašto svićeš tako rano (PGP RTB)
- 1979. Cune i Orkestar Mije Krnjevca - Predrag Cune Gojković (Beograd Disk)
- 1980. Ja prošetah kraj Morave - Cune i Snežana Đurišić (Diskoton)
- 1980. Cune Gojković i Dragan Toković - U Novom Sadu, Ej (PGP RTB)
- 1981. Ne mogu ti ništa osim cveća dati (Jugoton)
- 1981. Janičar (Jugoton)
- 1981. Predrag Gojković Cune i Mile Bogdanović - Ko zna više (Sarajevo Disk)
- 1987. Nezaboravne melodije (1987) (ZKP RLTV)
- 1988. Ko to kaže Srbija je mala (PGP RTB)
- 2001. Predrag Cune Gojković (Grand Production)
- 2002. Nestao je san (Grand Production)

=== EP and singles ===
- Halisko (1961) (PGP RTB)
- Kad zasvira harmonika (1961) (Jugoton)
- Prodavačica LJubičica (1962) (PGP RTB)
- Kafu mi draga ispeci (1962) (PGP RTB)
- Momak veseljak (1962) (PGP RTB)
- Zlatan prsten (1963) (PGP RTB)
- Mandoline na mesečini (1963) (PGP RTB)
- Halisko (1963) (PGP RTB)
- Kad ja imam konja vrana (1963) (PGP RTB)
- Oj, Moravo, oj (1963) (PGP RTB)
- Maramica svilenica - duet Predrag Gojković i Živka Đurić (1963) (PGP RTB)
- Probija se kolovođa (1963) (PGP RTB)
- Brazil (1963) (PGP RTB)
- Tri devojke zbor zborile (1963) (PGP RTB)
- Mama Huanita (1965) (PGP RTB)
- Pod Avalom svi je znaju (1965) (PGP RTB)
- Sirota je bez miraza (1966) (PGP RTB)
- Jedan tužan pozdrav (1966) (PGP RTB)
- Predrag Gojković i Nedeljko Bilkić - Beogradski sabor (1966) (PGP RTB)
- LJubav mi srce mori (1969) (PGP RTB)
- Crni vrhu kraju od Srbije (1970) (Šumadija)
- Crvena Zveda - Zvezda (1970) (Šumadija)
- Predrag Živković Tozovac i Cune Gojković - Zašto, zašto/Na rastanku poljubi me (1970) (PGP RTB)
- LJubav je večna/Morava me pesmom zadojila (1970) (PGP RTB)
- Komšinica/LJubav, ljubavi (1970) (PGP RTB)
- Don Žuan (1971) (Jugoton)
- Zašto da patim (1971) (Jugoton)
- Često suza kane/Tašana (1972) (Beograd disk)
- Zapevajmo pesme stare (1972) (Jugoton)
- Akordi Đerdapa - Tihomir Petrović i Cune (1972) (PGP RTB)
- Silvana Armenulić i Predrag Gojković - Gde si da si moj golube/Kad u jesen lišće žuti (1973) (Jugoton)
- Samo jednom srce ludi (1973) (PGP RTB)
- Žal za mladost (1973) (Studio B)
- Crne oči, plave oči/Zbog jedne žene (1973) (Studio B)
- Bećar/Rastanak je od sudbine dar (1973) (Jugoton)
- Hej drugovi/Život leti (1974) (Jugoton)
- Kad u ribu pođem (1974) (Studio B)
- Melodije iz TV serije Pozorište u kući (1974) (Diskoton)
- Nevena/Kućo moja sa sedam prozora (1974) (Jugoton)
- Esma Redžepova i Cune - Kaži, kaži, libe Stano (1974) (PGP RTB)
- Hej, drugovi/Život leti (1974) (Jugoton)
- Živka Đurić i Cune Gojković - Sitna kiša pada (1974) (Studio B)
- Još i danas (1974) (PGP RTB)
- Moj život je reka bez povratka (1975)
- Predrag Gojković Cune i ansambl Radojke i Tineta Živkovića - Sedam sela sedam mojih cura (1975) (PGP RTB)
- Oči i zvijezde (1975) (PGP RTB)
- Cune i Dragan - Dunave moje more (1975) (PGP RTB)
- Lepa, Usnija, Tozovac i Cune -Mani, mani (1978) (PGP RTB)
- Ko to kaže, ko to laže (1979)
- Kafu mi draga ispeci/Đerdapske delije (1980) (Beograd disk)
- Olivera, Dado i Cune - Napred plavi (1982) (PGP RTB)

=== Compilations ===
- 1973. Cune (PGP RTB)
- 1993. Zapevajmo pesme stare 1 (Lunar records)
- 1993. Zapevajmo pesme stare 2 (Lunar records)
- 1997. Kafu mi draga ispeci (Folk estrada)
- 1999. Pedeset godina sa vama (PGP RTS)
- 2005. Zlatna kolekcija (Flexmedia)
- 2008. Zapisano u vremenu (PGP RTS)
- 2013. Predrag Cune Gojković (Gold)

== See also ==
- Obren Pjevović
- Predrag Živković Tozovac
