= Sabahudin Bilalović =

Bosnian basketball player (1960–2003)

Personal information
- Born: 7 May 1960 Trebinje, PR Bosnia and Herzegovina, FPR Yugoslavia
- Died: 29 July 2003 (aged 43) Makarska, Croatia
- Listed height: 6 ft 10 in (2.08 m)

Career information
- NBA draft: 1982: undrafted
- Playing career: 1977–1999
- Position: Center

Career history
- 1977–1989: Bosna Sarajevo
- 1989–1990: KK Vojvodina
- 1990–1992: Bosna Sarajevo
- 1992–1993: Hapoel Nahariya
- 1993–1994: CB Breogán
- 1994–1995: KK Zagreb
- 1995: Lugano Tigers
- 1995–1996: Speyer
- 1997–1999: Česko 93 Sarajevo

Career highlights
- Euroleague champion (1979); 3× Yugoslav League champion (1978, 1980, 1983); 2× Yugoslav Cup winner (1978, 1984); EuroBasket Top Scorer (1993)
Medals
Men's basketball
Representing Yugoslavia
Goodwill Games
Gold medal – first place	1990 Seattle
European Championship for Cadets
Silver medal – second place	1977 France	Team

Sabahudin "Dino" Bilalović (7 May 1960 – 29 July 2003) was a Bosnian professional basketball player.

== About ==
He was born in Trebinje, Bosnia and Herzegovina.

In 1979, as a player of KK Bosna Sarajevo, in his early career years, he won the Euroleague at the time European Champions Cup.

== National team career ==
He made the national team of Yugoslavia in the early nineties for the 1990 Goodwill Games, the second games which took place in Seattle, United States, along with Dražen Petrović, Toni Kukoč, Žarko Paspalj, Dino Rađa other great stars of Yugoslavian basketball.

Later, in the first appearance of Bosnia and Herzegovina national basketball team, in EuroBasket 1993, he was the Top Scorer of the tournament averaging 24.1 points per game:

- vs. Latvia he scored 36 points,
- vs. Estonia he scored 29 points,
- vs. Croatia he scored 24 points,
- vs. Sweden he scored 26 points.
- vs. Italy he scored 22 points.
- vs. Russia he scored 21 points.
- vs. Spain he scored 18 points.
- vs. Greece he scored 17 points.
- vs. France he scored 24 points.

== Personal life ==
Bilalović's mother Ševka Bajraktarević (1934 – 30 September 2013) was the older sister of Silvana Armenulić, famous folk singer in Yugoslavia. Her other sisters Mirjana Bajraktarević and Dina Bajraktarević also maintained folk singing careers of their own.

== Death ==
Bilalović died July 2003 during his vacation to the Croatian coastal town of Makarska from previously diagnosed heart condition. He died of a heart attack on the beach while swimming with his son.
