= Teniski Klub Partizan =

TK Partizan
- Founded: 4 October 1945; 80 years ago
- Colors
- President: Branislav Radovanović
- Website: https://tkpartizan.rs/

Teniski klub Partizan is a tennis club from Belgrade, Serbia. The club is part of the sports society JSD Partizan, and its headquarters are in Humska 1, in addition to the other 27 clubs that are members of JSD Partizan.

The tennis school at the Club has been active since its foundation and is an incubator for young talents, both in Yugoslavia and in Serbia, creating regional sporting culture, and historical heritage. Notably, the club produced the likes of Jelena Genčić, as well as some of the best Serbian players in history in both singles and doubles, such as Novak Djokovic, Ana Ivanovic and Nenad Zimonjić.

== History ==
=== First years ===
TK Partizan was founded on 4 October 1945 as a section of Yugoslav People's Army (JNA), an organization that deals with other sports segments, hosted numerous international sports and tennis events, and seven years later, in 1952, it became a club within the sports society JSD Partizan and got its current name. The sport of Tennis had been neglected in Serbia for several decades, so the choice of JNA to keep this branch of sport automatically drew repeated views and comments, as well as certain troubles, which remained for a long time. However, the existence of TK Partizan within the sport's collective of the official army of the new state created an opportunity for the gradual return of tennis as an equal member of the sporting world, which resulted in the establishment of other tennis clubs throughout the country.

At the time of its foundation in 1945, the Second World War had just ended, and Belgrade was badly damaged by several bombs, so the tennis courts were far and few. This lack of pitches in Belgrade was only significantly alleviated when, in 1952, the sports center known today as Partizan Stadium, sprang up around the JNA football stadium. The new 12 courts meant the doubling of the existing number of courts in the city and the complete opening of tennis for Belgrade’s youth as well as for older residents.

Partizan Tennis Club made a big sensation in 1954 when the southern part of the football stadium was turned into a tennis arena with 20,000 seats, thus bringing the then most famous tennis professionals. The club held well-attended tennis tournaments which helped develop tennis in Serbia significantly. There is just a high fence between the football field and the tennis courts, so the players usually watch each other training.

In the new tennis park, TK Partizan took the lead by establishing a real tennis school with over 400 students, which was an example for other clubs, so a significant step was taken in creating new players. At one point, TK Partizan and the school gathered over 1,000 members.

=== Golden era ===
In the following years, TK Partizan won the Yugoslav team championship in both men’s and women’s competitions, and its members became individual state champions. Many talented young men and women from other clubs came to TK Partizan because of the well-designed training program, good coaches, and strong competition. However, all this took place in objectively modest conditions, when it was difficult to get the necessary equipment and when the rooms under the east stand of the football stadium were used as changing rooms.

Jelena Genčić played for Partizan from 1954 to 1976. She was the champion of Yugoslavia 18 times: 2 times individually, 6 times in women's pairs and 12 times in mixed pairs, while she was second 11 times.

In total, Partizan has won 19 state championship titles in men's and 12 titles in women's competitions.

=== Recent years ===
The club now has 11 clay and 3 concrete courts, an old club building, whose contents, with an area of about 350 m², include changing rooms, a restaurant, and offices. TK Partizan is currently in the process of building a new tennis stadium with modern necessary facilities.

== Notable players ==
Teniski Klub Partizan has produced some of the best Serbian players in history in both singles and doubles, but also a few foreign, such as Jelena Dokić from Australia and Andrea Petković from Germany.

=== Men ===
- (Serbia) Novak Djokovic, No. 1 tennis player in the world
- (Serbia) Janko Tipsarević, No. 8 tennis player in the world
- (Serbia) Nenad Zimonjić, No. 1 tennis player in the world in doubles
- (Croatia) Nikola Mektić, No. 1 tennis player in the world in doubles
- (Serbia) Dušan Lajović
- (Serbia) Filip Krajinović
- (Serbia) Miomir Kecmanović
- (Serbia) Marko Tepavac
- (Serbia) Dušan Vemić
- (Serbia) Ilija Bozoljac
- (Serbia) (Montenegro) Goran Tošić
- (Serbia) (Bosnia and Herzegovina) Nikola Čačić
- (Serbia) Darko Mađarovski
- (Serbia) Alex Vlaški
- (Serbia) Vladimir Obradović
- (Serbia) Arsenije Zlatanović
- (Serbia) Srđan Muškatirović
- (Serbia) Nikola Špear
- (Serbia) Radmilo Armenulić
- (Serbia) Ivko Plećević
- (Serbia) (United States) Sima Nikolic
- (Socialist Federal Republic of Yugoslavia) (United States) Ika Panajotovic
- (Serbia) Bojan Zdravković

=== Women ===
- (Serbia) Ana Ivanovic, No. 1 tennis player in the world
- (Germany) Andrea Petkovic
- (Serbia) Bojana Jovanovski
- (Serbia) (Australia) Jelena Dokic
- (Australia) Marija Mirkovic
- (Bosnia and Herzegovina) Dea Herdželaš
- (Serbia) Olga Danilović
- (Serbia) Milana Spremo
- (Serbia) Andrea Popović
- (Serbia) Ana Jovanović
- (Serbia) Teodora Mirčić
- (Serbia) Tamara Čurović
- (Serbia) Nataša Zorić
- (Serbia) Vojislava Lukić
- (Serbia) (France) Ana-Maria Zubori
- (Serbia) Dragana Zarić
- (Serbia) Katarina Mišić
- (Serbia) Dora Alavantić
- (Serbia) Sonja Požeg
- (Serbia) Biljana Kostić
- (Serbia) Jelena Genčić
- (Serbia) Dragica Laslo

== Honours ==
=== Men ===
- National Championships
  - Winners (20) : 1952, 1953, 1956, 1957, 1958, 1959, 1961, 1985, 1986, 1989, 1992, 1993, 1994, 1995, 1996, 1997, 2001, 2003, 2005, 2007.

=== Women ===
- National Championships
  - Winners (11) : 1963, 1968, 1970, 1971, 1972, 1973, 1974, 1975, 2000, 2009, 2012.
