= Donja Gorevnica =

- Village
- Location within Serbia
- Coordinates: 43°52′36″N 20°30′00″E
- Country: Serbia
- District: Moravica District
- Municipality: Čačak

Area
  - Total: 10.35 km^{2} (4.00 sq mi)
- Elevation: 207 m (679 ft)

Population (2011)
  - Total: 877
  - Density: 84.7/km^{2} (219/sq mi)
- Time zone: UTC+1 (CET)
  - Summer (DST): UTC+2 (CEST)

Donja Gorevnica (Serbian Cyrillic: Доња Горевница) is a village in the municipality of Čačak, Serbia. According to the 2011 census, the village has a population of 877 people.

== Notable people ==
- Jovan Kursula (1768–1813), Serbian revolutionary.
- Obren Pjevović (1919-1991), Serbian composer.

== Sources ==
- Marković, Radul; Pantović, Miloljub S. (1996). Donja Gorevnica: zemlja i ljudi. Odbor za proučavanje sela SANU.
