= Miločaj =

Coordinates: 43°47′N 20°38′E

Miločaj Милочај (Serbian)
- Village (Selo)
- Interactive map of Miločaj
- Country: Serbia
- District: Raška District
- Municipality: Kraljevo
- Time zone: UTC+1 (CET)
  - Summer (DST): UTC+2 (CEST)

Miločaj is a village situated in Kraljevo municipality in Serbia.

Famous singer Lepa Lukić was born in this village.
