= Radmilo Armenulić =

Serbian tennis player and coach (born 1940)

- Радмило Арменулић
- Born: 1940 (age 85–86); Belgrade, Kingdom of Yugoslavia
- Occupations: Tennis player and coach

Radmilo Armenulić (Serbian Cyrillic: Радмило Арменулић; born 1940), is a Serbian former tennis player and tennis coach.

== Career ==
Radmilo was born in Belgrade in 1940, and began his career in Partizan Tennis Club. He was a state champion in the junior categories and played in the Galea Cup (under 21 years). After a conflict with the team selector, Radmilo went to Germany, where he had a career as a tennis player and a tennis coach. He spent 12 years in Offenbach. Armenulić was the longest serving federal captain in the history of Yugoslavian and Serbian tennis, serving 17 years and three months.

Armenulić trained a generation of players, including Bruno Orešar, Goran Prpić, Slobodan Živojinović and Goran Ivanišević. They were the champions of the Balkans three times; were ranked third in the world for under-21 players in the Galea Cup three times; were three-time semifinalists in the World Group Davis Cup (1988, 1989, 1991), and for six years they were among the top eight in the world.

== Personal life ==
His first wife was the singer Silvana Armenulić, with whom he has a daughter Gordana.
