= Predrag Živković Tozovac =

Serbian folk singer and composer (1936–2021)

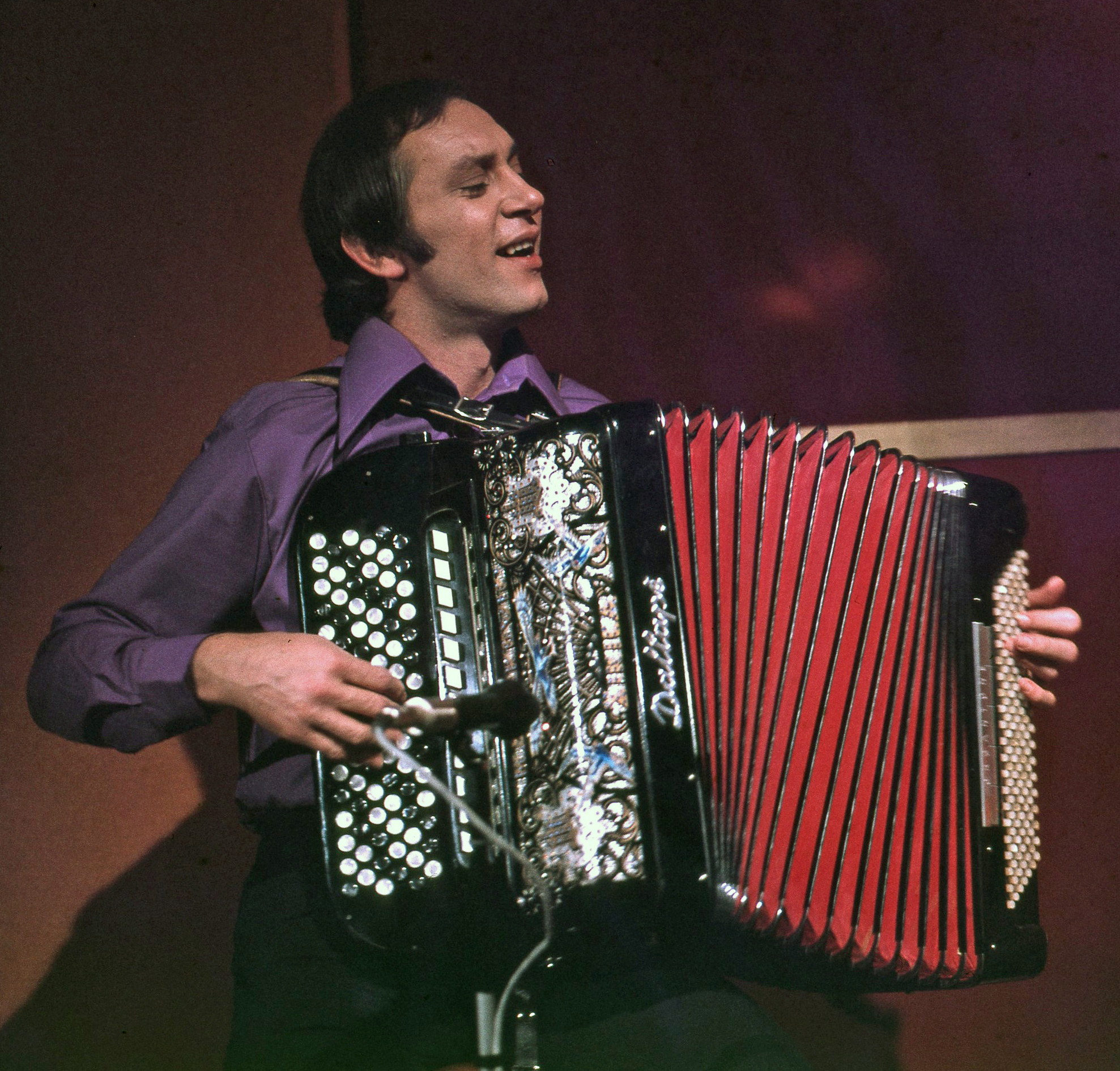

Background information
- Also known as: Tozovac (pronounced [tǒːzoʋats])
- Born: Predrag Živković; 22 January 1936; Kraljevo, Kingdom of Yugoslavia
- Died: 6 April 2021 (aged 85) Belgrade, Serbia
- Genres: Folk
- Occupations: musician, actor
- Years active: 1946–2021
- Labels: PGP-RTB, Diskoton, Grand Production

Predrag Živković (Serbian Cyrillic: Предраг Живковић; 22 January 1936 – 6 April 2021), nicknamed Tozovac (Serbian Cyrillic: Тозовац) was one of the most famous Serbian folk singers and composers. He was also an accomplished accordion player and entertainer who appeared in movies and hosted several music TV shows.

He died on 6 April 2021, because of difficulties with COVID-19.

== Early life ==
Tozovac was born in Kraljevo, Kingdom of Yugoslavia on 22 January 1936. His father Svetozar "Toza" Živković was also a musician and a restaurant owner, while mother Budimka was a housewife. His father was killed by Germans in 1941 in Kraljevo during the Axis occupation of Serbia.

He went to Kraljevo high school and in 1976 graduated at the Higher School of Economics in Belgrade.

He began working as a musician in the 1960s, first as an accordion player who accompanied other, more prominent singers, while later in the decade, he teamed up with other composers like Duško Radetić, Bane Popov, and Dušan Karaklajić, becoming a folk music star himself.

== Musical career ==
During his 40-year-long career, Tozovac recorded over 30 singles and 20 albums, played on over 300 concerts in all of the former Yugoslavia, France, United States, Canada, United Kingdom, Austria, Germany, etc. Most prominent concerts were in Belgrade, in the Dom Sindikata Hall and in Zagreb, in the Vatroslav Lisinski Concert Hall.

In addition to songs either composed by him or his colleagues, he also recorded many Serbian folk songs. Most important hits during his career are:

- Mirjana
- Ide Mile Lajkovačkom prugom
- Gde si da si moj golube (duet with Mira Vasiljević)
- Vodeničareva ćerka
- Prazna čaša na mom stolu
- Oči jedne žene
- Ljubavi moja tugo
- Ti si me čekala
- Violino ne sviraj
- Malo po malo
- Pričaj mi o njoj
- Igrale se delije
- Jeremija
- Siromah sam, al volim da živim
- Uzmi sve što ti život pruža
- Nosila je plavi šeširić na glavi
- Vlajna
- Tražiću ljubav novu
- Leno, Magdaleno
- To ludo srce moje

== Television ==
In the 1980s, Tozovac became a co-host of the highly popular TV folk-music show Folk parada on Television Belgrade, with another major folk star, Predrag Cune Gojković, and actress and singer Zlata Petković.

In the late 1990s and early 2000s he didn't record much, but he scored a few hits, like Danče, Ljubav je za sve godine and a duet with Lepa Lukić, and was again a co-host of the most popular music TV show in Serbia, Grand Show, on TV Pink. He also held a very popular three-singers concert, performing with Predrag Cune Gojković and Miroslav Ilić.

He appeared in several feature and TV movies, like I Bog stvori kafansku pevačicu (1972) and Balkan express 2 (1989).

== Personal life ==
Tozovac has two illegitimate sons, and stories continue to circulate that Živković loved many beauties, one of whom was Biljana Ristić. But after countless adventures, he finally married in the Fall of 2016, at age 80, to his longtime sweetheart of over 30 years, Mima. "Mima is my true love and my choice. Our relationship is more than love. I would describe love as a short-term disease. We are only now in the most beautiful phase because we have become friends who cannot be one without the other", he said. He and Mima lived in Belgrade.

Živković was very outspoken about author's rights and education of young musicians. He was awarded the golden Medal for Merits of the Republic of Serbia in 2019.

== See also ==
- Predrag Gojković Cune
