= Tarevci =

Tarevci Таревци (Serbian)
- Village (Selo)
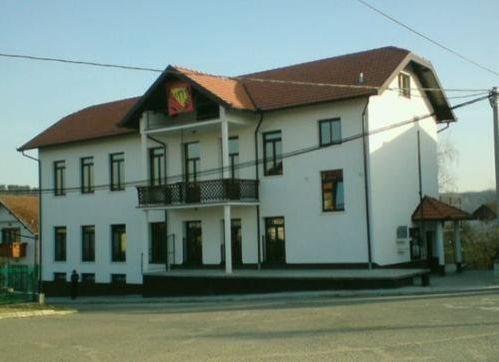
- Tarevci village hall

- Location within Bosnia and Herzegovina
- Coordinates: 44°57′11″N 18°16′23″E
- Country: Bosnia and Herzegovina
- Entity: Republika Srpska
- Municipality: Modriča

Population (1991)
  - Total: 2,322
- Time zone: UTC+1 (CET)
  - Summer (DST): UTC+2 (CEST)

Tarevci is a village in the municipality of Modriča, Bosnia and Herzegovina.
