= Radmilović, Knić =

Radmilović
- Village
- Interactive map of Radmilović
- Coordinates: 43.9486°N 20.6353°E
- Country: Serbia
- District: Šumadija District
- Municipality: Knić
- Elevation: 876 ft (267 m)
- Time zone: UTC+1 (CET)
  - Summer (DST): UTC+2 (CEST)
- Postal code: 34240

Radmilović is a village situated in Knić municipality in Serbia.
