= Miroslav Ilić =

Serbian singer (born 1950)

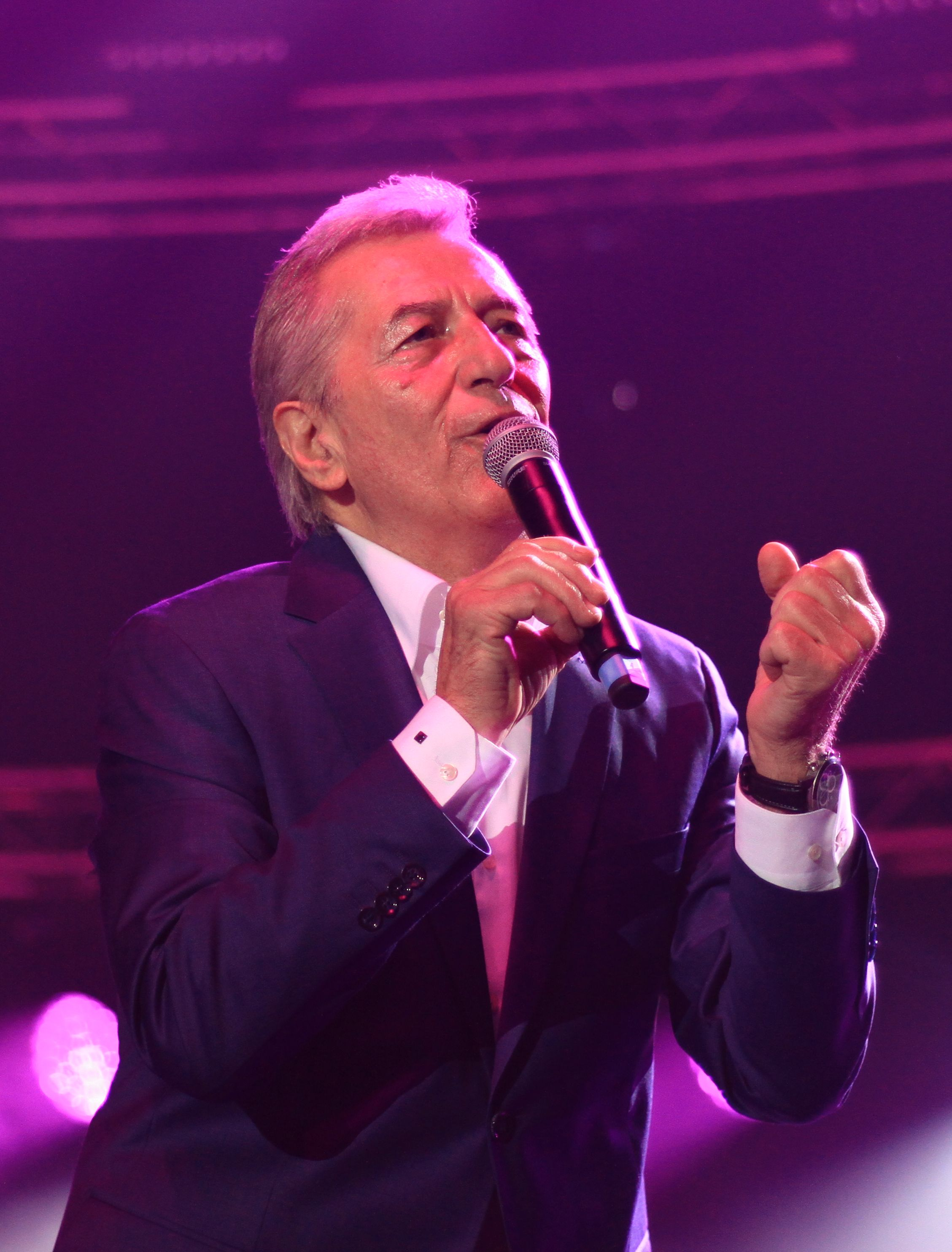
- Ilić performing in 2016

Background information
- Born: Miroslav Ilić; 10 December 1950 (age 75)
- Origin: Mrčajevci, PR Serbia, FPR Yugoslavia
- Genre: Folk
- Occupations: Singer; songwriter
- Instrument: Vocals
- Years active: 1965–present
- Labels: Diskos; PGP-RTB; PGP-RTS

Miroslav Ilić (Serbo-Croatian Cyrillic: Мирослав Илић; born 10 December 1950) is a Serbian singer. Born in the village of Mrčajevci near Čačak, he made his recording debut whilst still in elementary school. Ilić came to prominence upon the release of his 1972 single "Voleo Sam Devojku Iz Grada".

Referred to as the "Nightingale from Mrčajevci" (Slavuj iz Mrčajevaca), Ilić is known for referencing the ethos of his native region, Šumadija, in his songs. With sales of over eight million records in the former Yugoslavia, he is one of the most commercially successful Serbian folk singers of all time. Moreover, his 1982 album was sold in 900,000 copies, becoming the third best-selling studio album from the SFR Yugoslavia.

In December 2022, Ilić celebrated fifty years of his career in music by performing two consecutive concerts in the Belgrade Arena.

In addition to music, he starred in the 1981 film Sok od šljiva and served as a judge on the singing competition Pinkove Zvezde (2014–2016)

== Discography ==
Studio albums

- Sokaci su zavejani snegom (1976)
- Sreli smo se bilo je to davno (1979)
- U svet odoh majko (1980)
- Tako mi nedostaješ (1981)
- Shvatio sam, ne mogu bez tebe (1982)
- Kad si sa mnom ne misli na vreme / Ti si moja simpatija (1983)
- Putujem, putujem (1984)
- Zoveš me na vino (1985)
- Novi hitovi (1986)
- Misliš li na mene (1987)
- 10 godina sa vama (1988)
- Lažu da vreme leči sve (1989)
- Šta će nama tugovanje (1990)
- Moravsko predvečerje (1991)
- Prošlost moja (1993)
- Probudi se srce moje (1996)
- Čuvajte mi pesme (1998)
- Što si rano zaspala (1999)
- Tek smo počeli (2001)
- Može li se, prijatelju (2002)
- Eto mene (2004)
- Dajem reč (2005)
- Mani me godina (2010)
- Volim te neizlečivo (2014)

Awards
New title	Serbian Oscar Of Popularity; The Male Folk Singer of the Year; 2009	Succeeded by Haris Džinović
