= Vasilija Radojčić =

Vasilija Radojčić Василија Радојчић
- Born: 21 April 1936; Kragujevac, Yugoslavia
- Died: 25 September 2011 (aged 75); Belgrade, Serbia

Vasilija Radojčić (Serbian: Василија Радојчић; 21 April 1936 – 25 September 2011) was a Serbian singer.
