= Kolari (Smederevo) =

- Village (Selo)
- Motto: The Oldest Town
- Location within Serbia
- Coordinates: 44°35′04″N 20°54′05″E
- Country: Serbia
- District: Podunavlje District
- Municipality: Smederevo

Population (2022)
  - Total: 1,014
- Time zone: UTC+1 (CET)
  - Summer (DST): UTC+2 (CEST)

Kolari is a village in the municipality of Smederevo, Serbia also known as "Little Colombia". According to the 2002 census, the village has a population of 1196 people.

The village gave several Serbian Revolutionaries, such as commander vojvoda Vule Ilić (1766–1834) and his father-in-law buljubaša Vreta.
