= Lepa Lukić =

Serbian folk singer (born 1940)

- Лепа Лукић
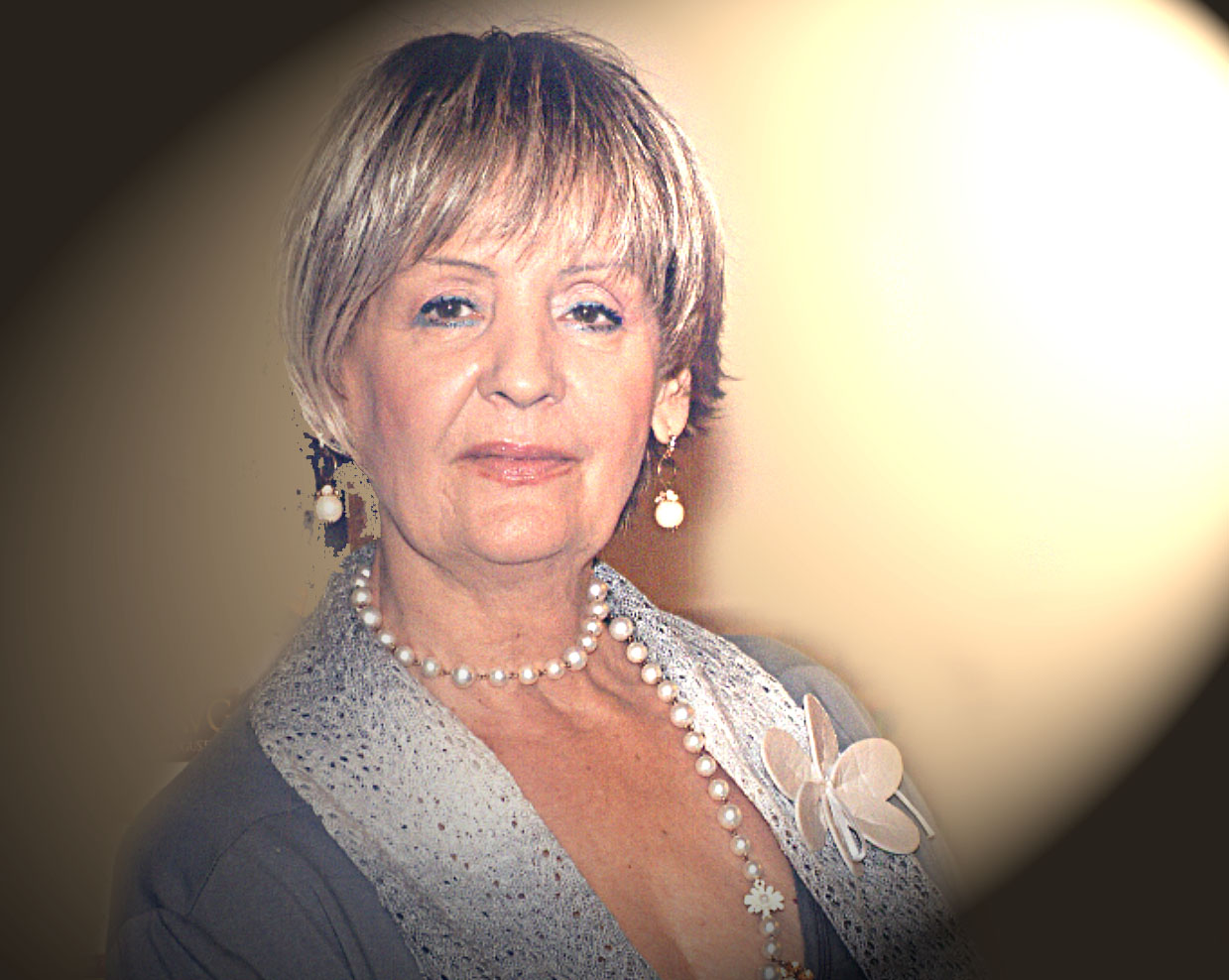
- Born: Lepava Mušović; January 13, 1940 (age 86); Miločaj, Yugoslavia (now Serbia)
- Spouse(s): Toma Lukić (divorced) Vlada Perović (divorced) Milan Milanović (m. 2000; died 2019)
- Partner: Duško Štrbac (?-?)
- Musical career
- Genres: folk
- Occupations: Musician, singer
- Instrument: Vocals
- Years active: 1964–present

Lepava Mušović (Serbian Cyrillic: Лепава Мушовић; born 13 January 1940), known professionally as Lepa Lukić (Serbian Cyrillic: Лепа Лукић), is a Serbian folk singer with a career spanning more than six decades. One of her biggest hits is "Srce je moje violina" (My Heart is a Violin).

== Early life and family ==
Lepava Mušović in the village of Miločaj near Kraljevo in Serbia, at the time part of Kingdom of Yugoslavia. Contrary to most sources, Lepava was actually born 13 January 1940, rather than 16 January 1940 when she was given a birth certificate. Her father, Radisav, died in 1942, at age 30, when Lepava was two years old. Her mother, Milosija (1913–2007), lived to the age of 94. Lepava has one older brother, Radomir, born in 1936.

== Career ==
Lepava began singing at about the age of ten, circa 1950 in her village. Her professional singing career began in the 1960s, when she recorded duets with singers Mića Stojanović and Gvozden Radičević.

At the beginning of her professional career, Lukić wished to sing as a soloist instead of in the then-popular duet format. During a concert in Aleksandrovac, Lukić expressed her desire to sing as a soloist to accordion player and composer Radojka Živković (1923–2002). At first hesitant, Živković agreed after Lepa began crying and begging her to allow her to prove herself as a solo singer. Upon hearing Lepa sing one song, Živković asked her to sing a second, a third, and a fourth.

There are two versions of how Lepa Lukić got her solo recording deal. Her version says that on a bus ride to Belgrade in 1967, the composer Petar Tanasijević was sitting behind her and tapped her shoulder and asked her if she wanted to record as a soloist, which she immediately agreed to. The next day, Tanasijević offered her the song "Od izvora dva putića" (From the Spring of Two Roads), which she recorded along with three other songs for her first album, released in 1967. The other version of the story, as told by Petar Tanasijević, was that one night in autumn of 1964, on a bus ride to Aleksandrovac, he was sitting in front of Lepa as she sang a song which annoyed him, so he asked her to stop. She looked at him in defiance and continued singing. After they arrived to Belgrade and got off the bus, he asked somebody who that "uncivilized" girl on the bus was. He was told that she was just a "kafana singer". During the concert that night, he was in the audience when Lepa came onto the stage with accordion player Radojka Živković to sing. He said that he shuddered and a chill went down his spine when he heard her voice on stage, even comparing her to popular sevdalinka singer Nada Mamula. After her performance, he found her backstage and congratulated her. He promised to write a song for her and she said "I love you. Help me get out of the kafanas. I'm sick of everything." As his version of the story goes, one year later he composed the song "Od izvora dva putića" and thought of her. He contacted her and gave her the song.

Although she never met novelist Ivo Andrić (1892–1975), it was rumored that he liked her song "Vremena su prošla stara" (Old Times Have Passed), also written by Petar Tanasijević.

Lukić announced the last solo concert in her career for 27 September 2023 at Dom Sindikata, Belgrade.

== Personal life ==
Lukić has been married three times in her life, but she never had children from any of these marriages. Her first husband was Toma Lukić, whose surname she kept after their marriage. They were married for seven years before divorcing. She later married her second husband, Vlada Perović. That marriage also lasted seven years and ended in divorce after Lukić discovered that Perović had been unfaithful. In 1999, Lukić began dating her future husband, Milan Milanović. They married a year later, and their marriage lasted until Milanović's death in 2019. Lukić also had a domestic partner, Duško Štrbac, who was nine years younger than her. Their relationship lasted seven years, until Štrbac died from a stroke.

She was a friend of footballer Miljan Miljanić (1930–2012), as well as Bosnian singer Silvana Armenulić (1939–1976), with whom she was asked to perform with at Silvana's final concert the night she died in 1976, but overslept for the first time in her career and did not make it to the concert. Had she gone, she believes she would have lost her life in the car accident that killed Silvana and her sister Mirsada Mirjana Bajraktarević. In 2013, Lepa revealed in an interview that she hasn't driven a car since Silvana's death, out of fear that she would share the same fate as the two sisters.
