= Tolisa =

Tolisa may refer to the following entities in Bosnia and Herzegovina:

- Tolisa (river)
- Tolisa, Modriča
- Tolisa, Orašje
