= Doboj =

Doboj Добој
- City
- Grad Doboj; Град Добој; City of Doboj
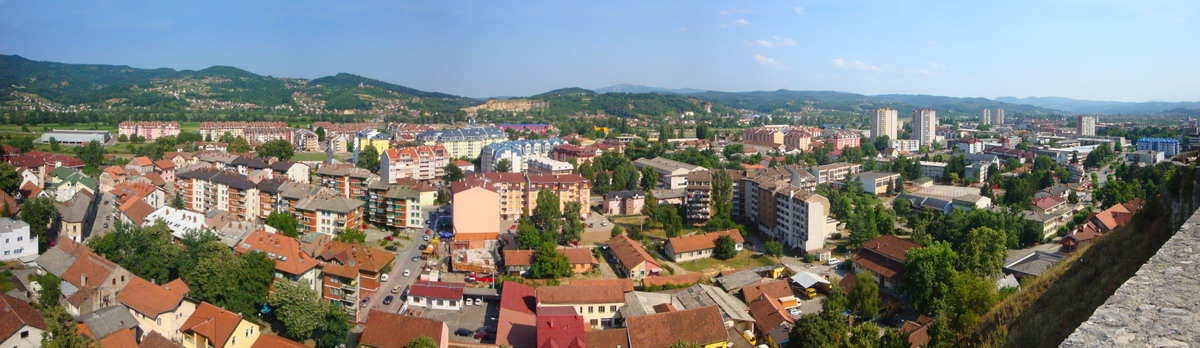
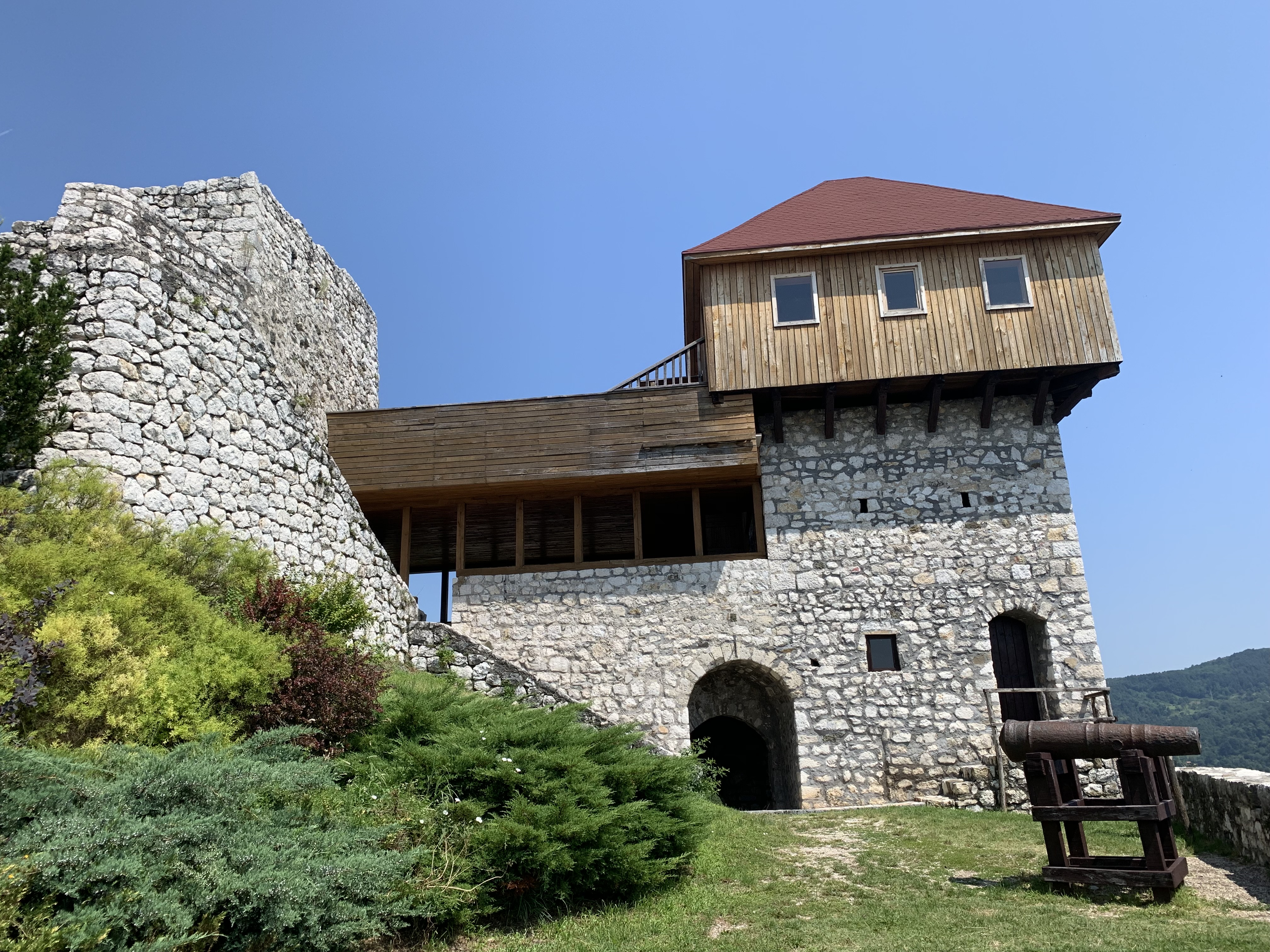
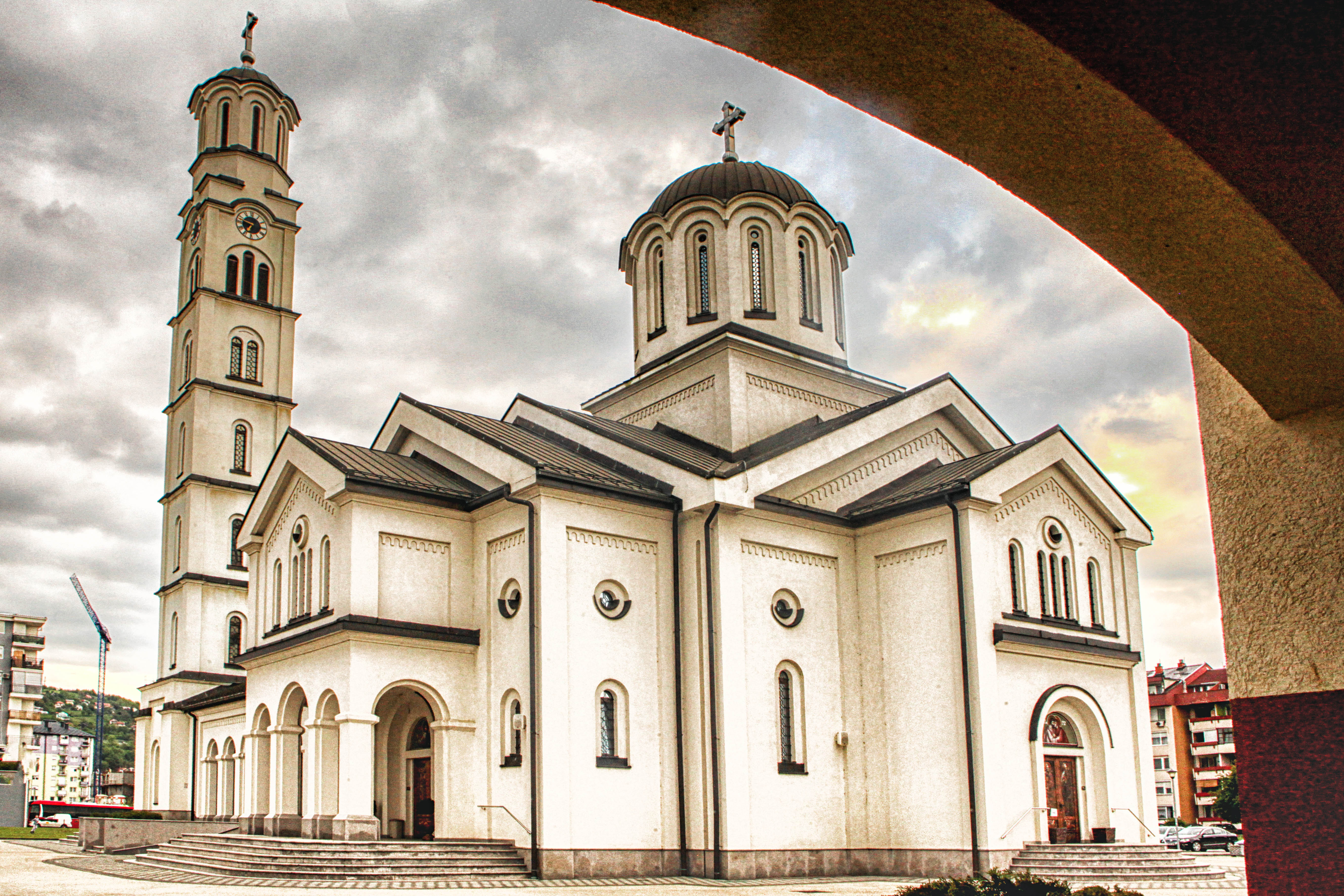
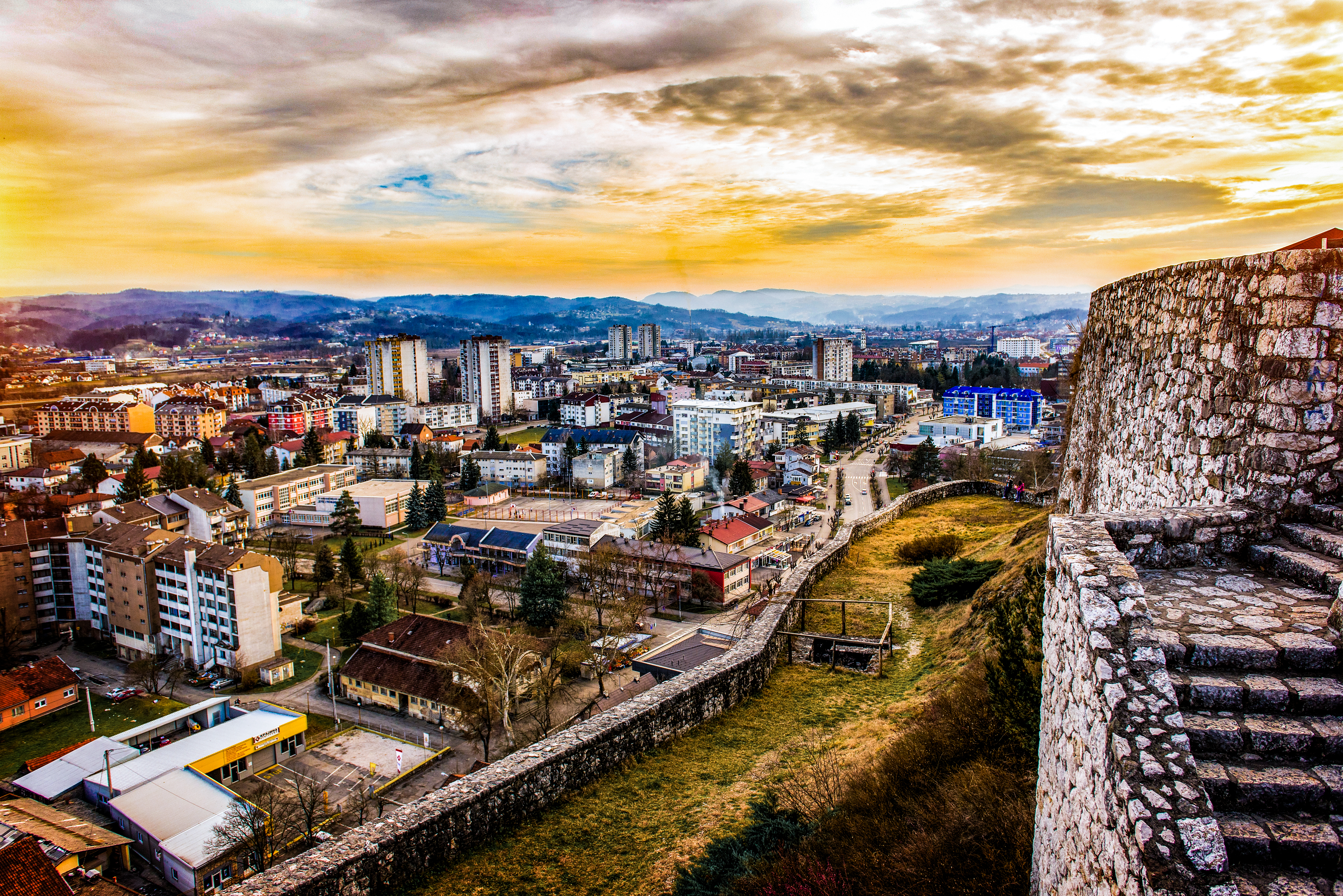
- From the top to bottom-right, Panoramic View of Doboj, Doboj Fortress, Orthodox Church of the Nativity of the Blessed Virgin, View over city from the fortress walls

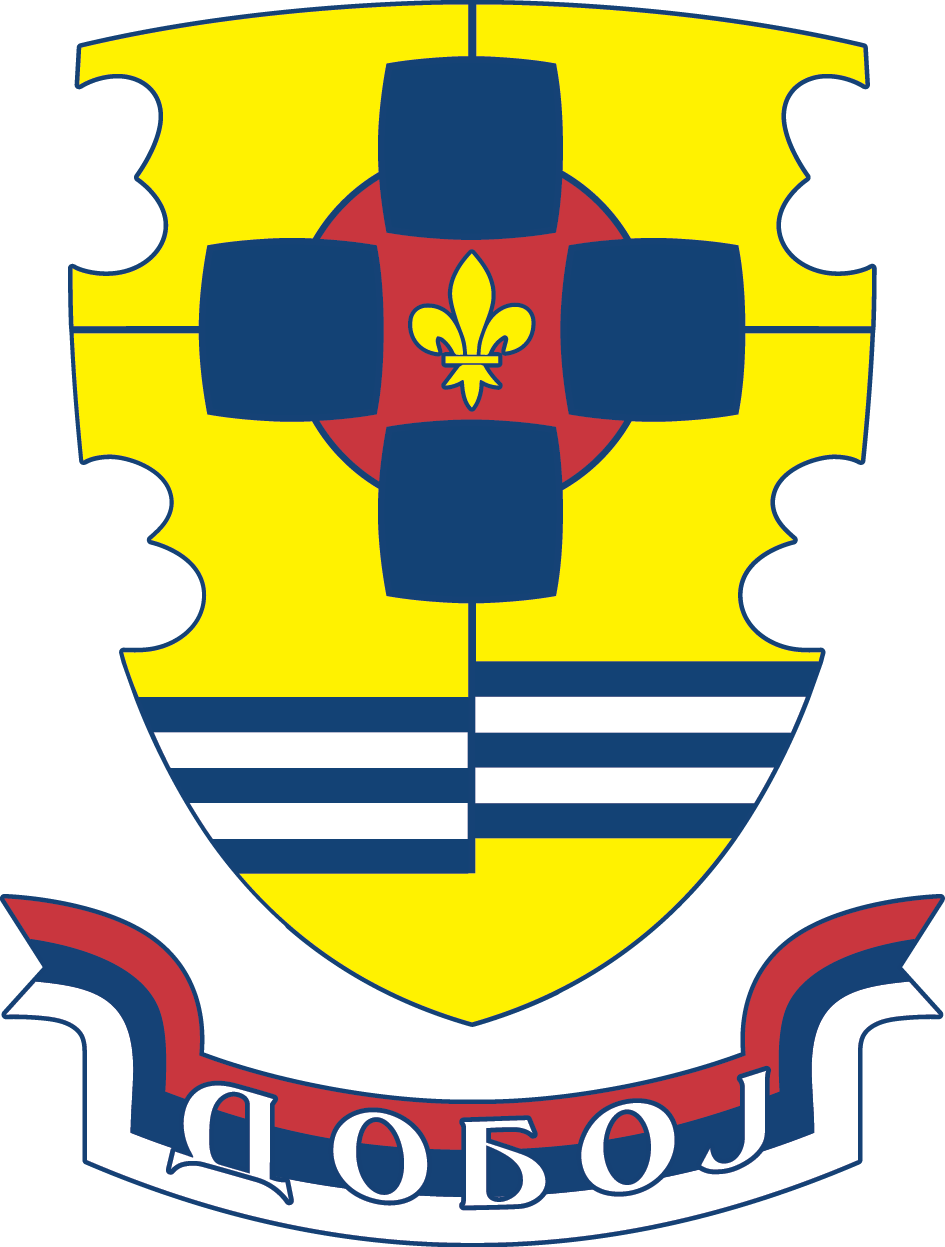
- Flag Seal

- Location of Doboj within Bosnia and Herzegovina

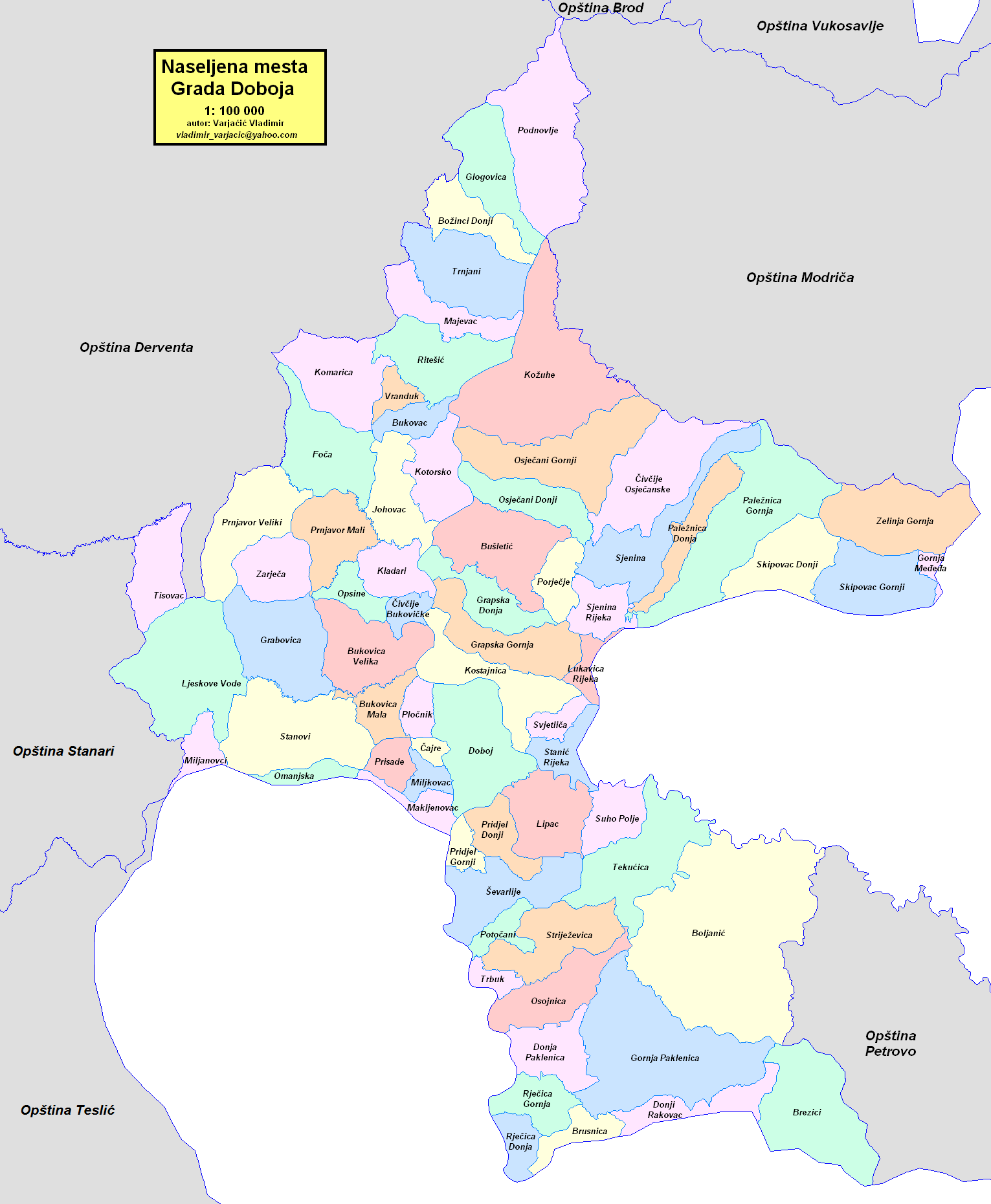
- Coordinates: 44°43′53″N 18°05′04″E
- Country: Bosnia and Herzegovina
- Entity: Republika Srpska
- Geographical region: Posavina/Doboj Basin
- First written record: 28 June 1415
- City status: July 2012

Government
  - Type: Mayor-council government
  - Body: Mayor of Doboj
  - Mayor: Boris Jerinić (SNSD)

Area
  - City: 648 km^{2} (250 sq mi)
  - Land: 648 km^{2} (250 sq mi)

Population (2013 census)
  - City: 71,441
  - Density: 110/km^{2} (286/sq mi)
  - Urban: 26,987
- Time zone: UTC+1 (CET)
  - Summer (DST): UTC+2 (CEST)
- Area code: +387 53
- Website: doboj.gov.ba

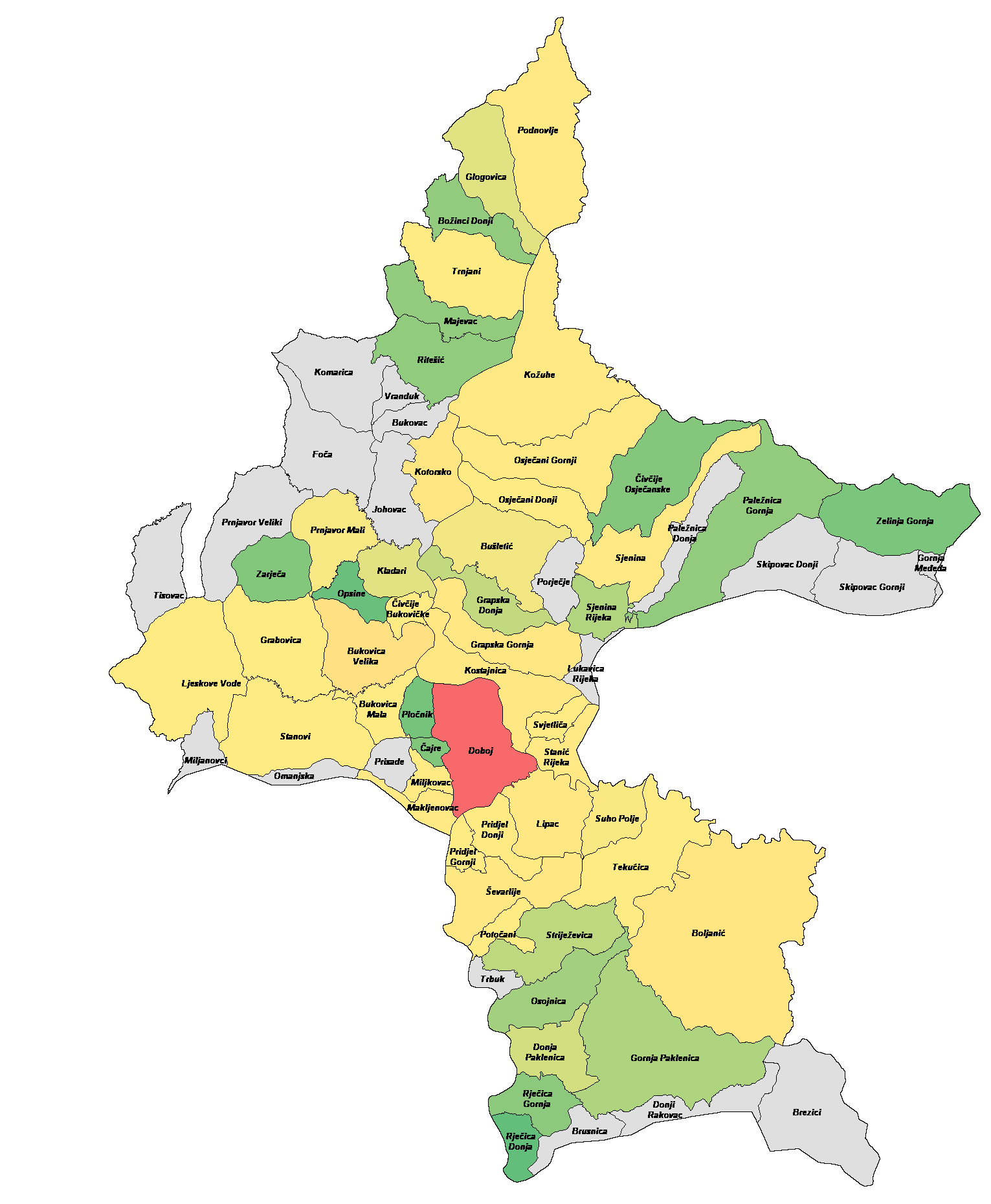
Doboj municipality by population proportional to the settlement with the highest and lowest population

Doboj (Cyrillic | Добој, pronounced [dôboj]) is a city in Bosnia and Herzegovina. It is situated on the banks of the Bosna river, in the northern region of Bosnia and Herzegovina. As of 2013, it has a population of 71,441 inhabitants.

Doboj is the largest national railway junction and the operational base of the Railways Corporation of Bosnia and Herzegovina. It is one of the oldest cities in Bosnia and Herzegovina and, aside from Banja Luka, the most important urban center in northern Bosnia and Herzegovina.

== Geography ==
Prior to the Bosnian War, the municipality of Doboj had a larger surface area. Most of the pre-war municipality's territory is part of Bosnian orthodox canton, including the city itself. The southern rural areas are part of the Zenica-Doboj Canton of the Federation of Bosnia and Herzegovina, and the eastern rural part of the municipality is part of the Tuzla Canton, also in the Federation of Bosnia and Herzegovina. The parts of the pre-war Doboj Municipality that are in the Federation of Bosnia and Herzegovina are the municipalities of Doboj South (Doboj Jug), Doboj East (Doboj Istok) and the Municipality of Usora. The northern suburbs of Doboj extend into the Pannonian plains, and effectively mark the southern tip of this great Central European plain. The southern (Doboj South) and eastern suburbs (Doboj East) are spread on the gentle hills which extend to the larger Central Bosnian mountain areas (Mt. Ozren in the southeast, Mt. Krnjin in the west).

=== Climate ===
Climate data for Doboj (1991–2020)
Month	Jan	Feb	Mar	Apr	May	Jun	Jul	Aug	Sep	Oct	Nov	Dec	Year
Record high °C (°F)	21.6 (70.9)	25.0 (77.0)	28.8 (83.8)	32.7 (90.9)	34.7 (94.5)	37.6 (99.7)	41.4 (106.5)	40.9 (105.6)	39.8 (103.6)	30.5 (86.9)	26.6 (79.9)	23.7 (74.7)	41.4 (106.5)
Mean daily maximum °C (°F)	5.4 (41.7)	8.5 (47.3)	13.7 (56.7)	18.6 (65.5)	23.0 (73.4)	26.6 (79.9)	28.7 (83.7)	29.1 (84.4)	23.7 (74.7)	18.6 (65.5)	12.2 (54.0)	6.1 (43.0)	17.9 (64.2)
Daily mean °C (°F)	1.1 (34.0)	2.9 (37.2)	7.3 (45.1)	12.1 (53.8)	16.5 (61.7)	20.5 (68.9)	22.1 (71.8)	21.9 (71.4)	16.7 (62.1)	12.0 (53.6)	7.1 (44.8)	2.2 (36.0)	11.9 (53.4)
Mean daily minimum °C (°F)	−2.6 (27.3)	−1.8 (28.8)	1.5 (34.7)	5.8 (42.4)	10.3 (50.5)	14.2 (57.6)	15.6 (60.1)	15.6 (60.1)	11.5 (52.7)	7.3 (45.1)	3.1 (37.6)	−1.3 (29.7)	6.6 (43.9)
Record low °C (°F)	−23.8 (−10.8)	−26.0 (−14.8)	−19.7 (−3.5)	−4.8 (23.4)	−0.2 (31.6)	4.2 (39.6)	7.4 (45.3)	6.6 (43.9)	1.0 (33.8)	−5.6 (21.9)	−10.2 (13.6)	−18.6 (−1.5)	−26.0 (−14.8)
Average precipitation mm (inches)	65.2 (2.57)	63.4 (2.50)	68.3 (2.69)	78.9 (3.11)	109.1 (4.30)	107.6 (4.24)	94.2 (3.71)	73.5 (2.89)	85.9 (3.38)	79.4 (3.13)	79.1 (3.11)	77.6 (3.06)	982.2 (38.67)
Average precipitation days (≥ 1.0 mm)	9.6	9.5	9.2	10.7	11.4	10.5	9.4	7.6	9.2	8.8	9.7	10.4	115.9
Source: NOAA

== History ==
=== Ancient times ===
Doboj has been continuously inhabited ever since the Neolithic times. Fragments of pottery and decorative art were found on several localities, with the most known site in Makljenovac, south from the city proper, at the confluence of the Usora and Bosna rivers. Archeological findings from the Paleolithic era were found in a cave in the Vila suburb.

The Illyrian tribe of Daesitates settled in this region as early as the twelfth century BC. Daesitates were one of the largest and most important Illyrian tribes residing at the territory of modern-day Bosnia and Herzegovina, sharing their northern borders with Breuci, another important tribe. Daesitates and Breuci started the Great Illyrian Revolt, or in Roman sources, the widespread rebellion known as Bellum Batonianum (6–9 AD). After the bloody rebellion was subdued, Roman legions permanently settled in the area and built a large military camp (Castrum) and a civilian settlement (Canabea) in Makljenovac. These structures were most likely built in the early Flavian dynasty era, during Vespasian's rule.

The military camp was large, in the shape of a near perfect rectangle with large towers at each corner and the main gate in the middle of the central wall, and served as the most important defense on the old Roman road from Brod to Sarajevo, demarcating the very borders of the Roman provinces of Dalmatia and Pannonia. It served its role for several centuries with the evidence of Belgian and Spanish cohorts stationed there in the second and third century AD. Canabea contained Roman settlers, with evidence of a large bathhouse with a hypocaust (central heating) and a concubine house for soldiers stationed at the nearby Castrum. A large Villa Rustica was located in the modern-day suburb of Doboj, appropriately named Vila. Very fine pieces of religious and practical artefacts were found at these sites, including an altar dedicated to Jupiter, figurines of Mars, and fragments of African made Terra sigillata pottery. When South Slavic tribes migrated into this area in the sixth and seventh century AD, they had settled initially on the ruins of the previous Roman settlement and lived there continuously until the early thirteenth century at which point they used stones and building material from the old Roman Castrum in order to build the stone foundation of the Gradina fortress, several kilometers north, in the modern-day old town of Doboj. Nowadays only the walls of the former camp and civilian settlement are still open to visitors.

=== Middle Ages ===
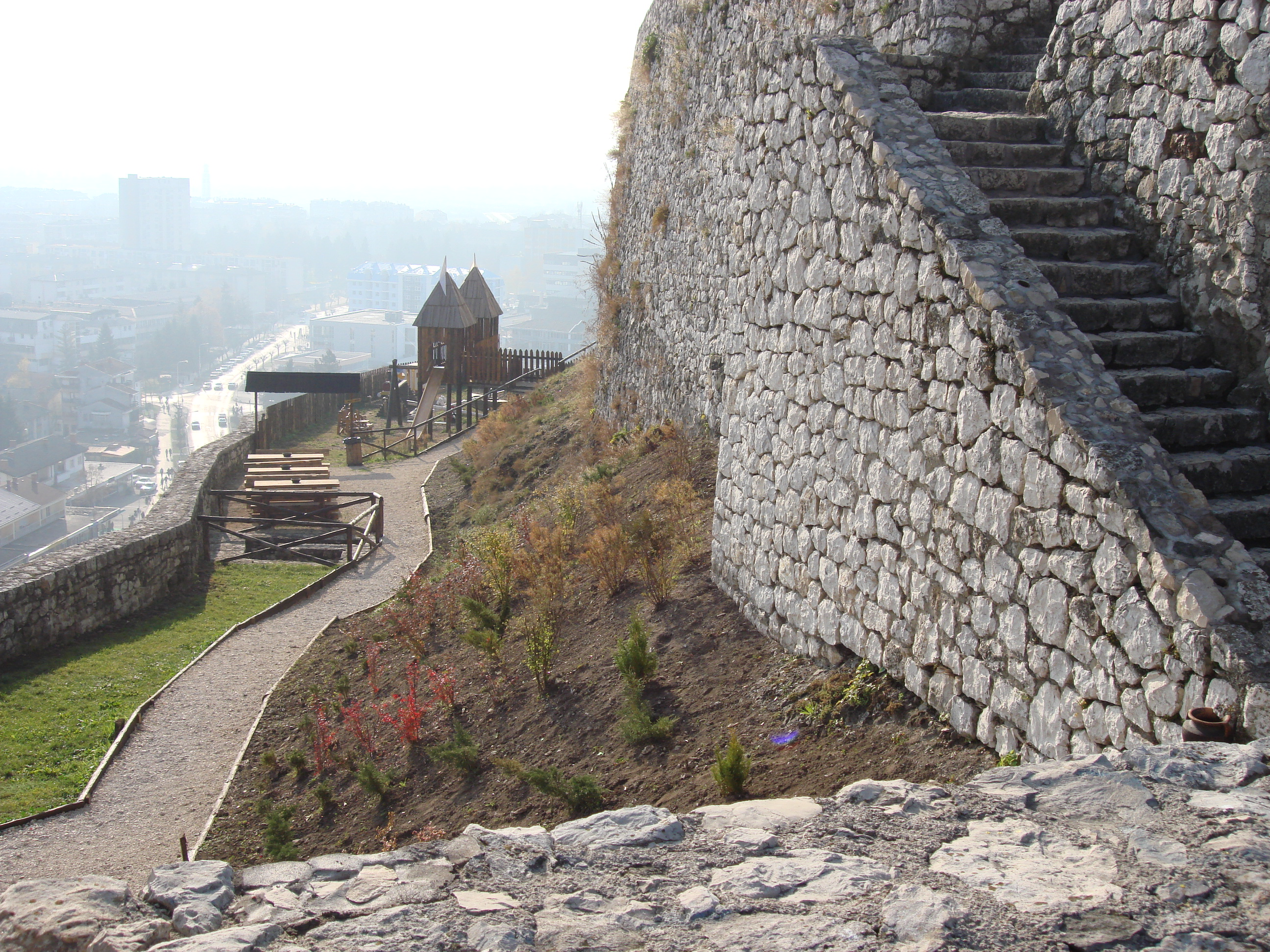
View of Doboj from the fortress

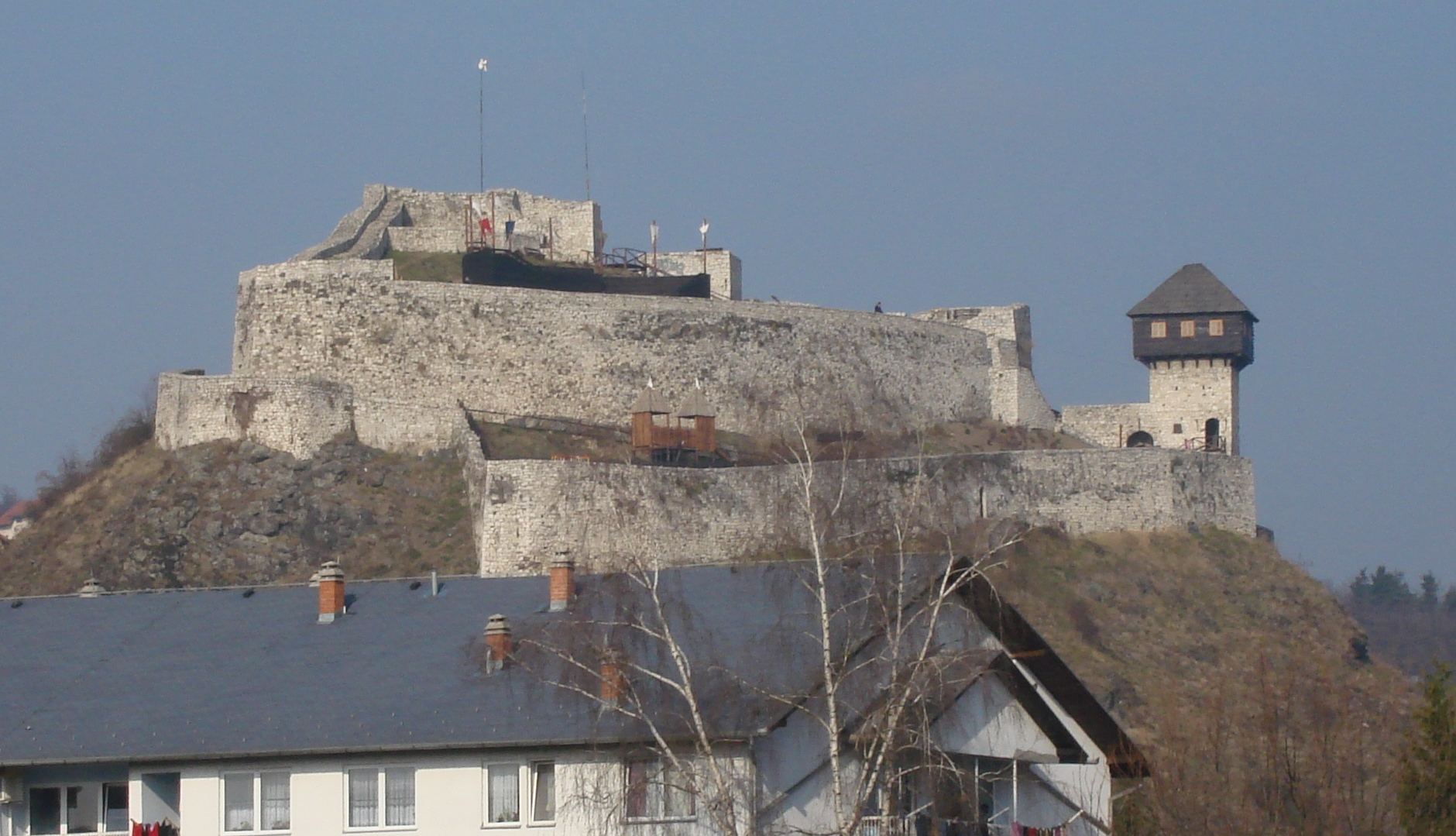
14th Century Doboj Fortress, reconstructed in 2006, with a wooden stage added during reconstruction

The first official mention of the city itself is from 1415, in a charter issued by Dubrovnik to the Holy Roman Emperor Sigismund, although there are numerous artefacts and objects that have been found (kept in the National Museum of Bosnia and Herzegovina in Sarajevo and the Regional Museum in Doboj), which confirm that the area had been inhabited ever since the early Stone Age, and that the Roman Empire had an army camp (Castrum) and a settlement (Canabea) in the vicinity of the town dating from the first century AD. Following the arrival of the Slavs in the sixth century it became a part of the region/Usora banate (in medieval documents sometimes collectively mentioned with the nearby province of Soli, hence, Usora and Soli).

The Doboj fortress, a royal Kotromanić fortress, was first built in the early thirteenth century and then expanded in the early fifteenth century (1415). It was expanded again during Ottoman rule in 1490. This newer stone foundation of the fortress was built on previous layers of an older foundation (dating back to the ninth or tenth century) made of wood, mud and clay (Motte-and-bailey type). It was a very important obstacle for invaders coming from the north, Hungarians, and later on, Austrians and Germans. It was built in the Gotho-Roman style with Gothic towers and Romanesque windows. The area saw numerous battles in medieval times and the fortress often changed hands between Bosnian and Hungarian armies. Doboj was the site of a particularly major battle between the Hungarians and a Bosnian-Turkish coalition in early August 1415 in which the Hungarians were heavily defeated on the field where the modern city of Doboj lies today. As an important border fortress between the Bosnian Kingdom and Hungary it was also frequently attacked, officially recorded as 18 times, in the Austro-Ottoman Wars, and fell to the Austro-Hungarians in 1878.

=== World War I and World War II ===
During World War I, Doboj was the site of the largest Austro-Hungarian concentration camp. According to the official figures, it held in total 45,791 people between 27 December 1915 and 5 July 1917, of which:

- 16,673 men from Bosnia and Herzegovina
- 16,996 women and children from Bosnia and Herzegovina (mostly of Serb ethnicity)
- 9,172 soldiers and civilians (men, women, children) from the Kingdom of Serbia
- 2,950 soldiers and civilians from the Kingdom of Montenegro

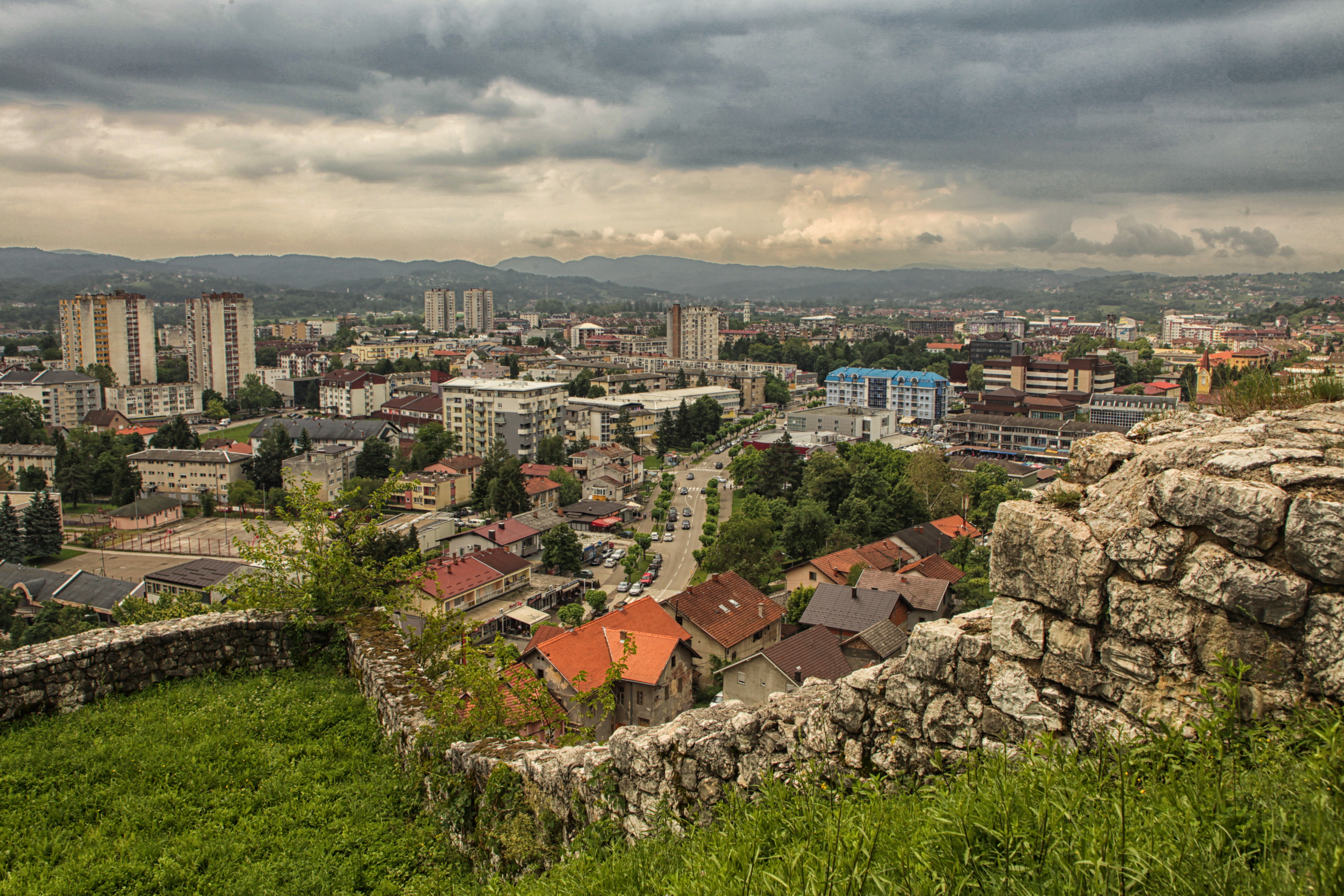

Some 12,000 people had died in this camp, largely due to malnutrition and poor sanitary conditions.

By February 1916, the authorities began redirecting the prisoners to other camps. Bosnian Serbs were mostly sent to Győr (Sopronyek, Šopronjek/Шопроњек).

Most of the prisoners from Bosnia were entire families from the border regions of eastern Bosnia and Herzegovina. It is said that 5,000 families alone were uprooted from the Sarajevo district in eastern Bosnia along the border with the Kingdoms of Serbia & Montenegro.

From 1929 to 1941, Doboj was part of the Vrbas Banovina of the Kingdom of Yugoslavia.

After the creation of the Independent State of Croatia in April 1941, the Jesuit priest Dragutin Kamber was appointed as the grand prefect of Doboj. He oversaw the mass arrest and internment of Serbs, many of whom were interrogated in his house before being executed in its basement. Kamber also supervised the rollout of Ustaše race laws in the district, ordering that Jews were to wear yellow armbands and Serbs were to wear white ones. The historian Robert B. McCormick estimates that Kamber "sent hundreds of Serbs to their deaths." During this time, the Ustaše deported Serbs, Jews and Roma, as well as pro-Partisan civilians, to concentration and labor camps. According to public records, 291 civilians from Doboj of all ethnicities perished in the Jasenovac concentration camp. In 2010, the remains of 23 people killed by the Partisans were found in two pits near the Doboj settlement of Majevac. The non-governmental organization which discovered the remains alleges that nearby pits contain the remains of hundreds more also killed by the Partisans.

Doboj was an important site for the Partisan resistance. From their initial uprising in August 1941 up until the end of the war, the Ozren Partisan squadron carried out numerous actions against the occupation forces, among the first successful operations in Bosnia and Herzegovina. The city was an important stronghold for permanently stationed Ustaše Militia and Croatian Home Guard garrisons with smaller Wehrmacht units serving as liaison and in defense of important roads and railroads. The Waffen SS "Handschar" division was partly mobilized from the local Muslim population and participated in battles around Doboj in the summer and fall of 1944.

Doboj with its surrounding area, the Ozren and Trebava mountains, was also a particularly important site for local Chetniks. They participated in battles against the Ustaše, Home Guards, and the Wehrmacht, initially allied with local Partisan units and then alone, after breaking ties with the Partisans in April 1942. In November 1944, the elements of the Ozren Chetnik Corps and the Trebava Chetnik Corps partook in the Operation Halyard, the largest US rescue mission behind enemy lines. They built an airstrip in the village of Boljanić from which rescued US Airmen flew to safety to Bari, Italy.

The town was eventually liberated by the Yugoslav Partisans on 17 April 1945. The units involved were the 14th Central Bosnian Brigade and the 53rd Division.

=== SFR Yugoslavia ===
The city was flooded in May 1965. During this period, the city experienced mass industrialization, becoming one of the most important industrial hubs in Yugoslavia.

=== Bosnian War ===
Doboj was strategically important during the Bosnian War. In May 1992, the control of Doboj was held by Bosnian Serb forces and the Serb Democratic Party governed the city. What followed was mass disarming and subsequently mass arrests of all non-Serb civilians (mainly Bosniaks and Croats).

Doboj was heavily shelled throughout the entire war by local Bosniak and Croatian forces. More than 5,500 shells, mortar rounds, and other projectiles were fired into the city proper and some 100 civilians were killed and more than 400 were wounded and maimed during the indiscriminate shelling.

A number of instances of war crimes and ethnic cleansing were committed by Bosnian Serb forces. Biljana Plavšić, Radovan Karadžić, Momčilo Krajišnik and others planned, instigated, ordered, committed or otherwise aided and abetted the planning, preparation or execution of the destruction of the Bosniaks and Bosnian Croats. Plavšić was charged with crimes against humanity that include but are not limited to the killings in Doboj. Her indictment was related to genocide charges in Doboj specifically.

Bosnian Serb forces were implicated in the systematic looting and destruction of Bosniak and Croat properties during the Bosnian War. A number of women were raped and civilians tortured or killed. All the mosques in the town were destroyed. A number of mass executions took place in Spreča Prison, on the banks of the river Bosna and in the "July 4th" military barrack in the village of Miljkovac, all in 1992. Many of the non-Serbs were detained at various locations in the town, subjected to inhumane conditions, including regular beatings, torture and forced labour. A school in Grapska and the factory used by the Bosanka company that produced jams and juices in Doboj was used as a rape camp. Four different armies of soldiers were present at the rape camps, including the local Serbian militia, the Yugoslav army (JNA), police forces based in the Serbian-occupied town of Knin and members of the White Eagles paramilitary group. The man who oversaw the women's detention in the school was Nikola Jorgić, a former police officer in Doboj, who had been convicted of genocide in Germany but died during the serving of his life sentence.

After the Dayton Agreement and the peace following in Bosnia and Herzegovina, the city served as a major HQ/base for IFOR (later SFOR) units.

The Court of Bosnia and Herzegovina is processing several cases for other war crimes in Doboj.

=== 2014 floods ===
In May 2014, Doboj was the city in Bosnia and Herzegovina that accounted for the most damage and casualties during and following the historic rainfall that caused massive flooding and landslides, taking the lives of at least 20 people in Doboj alone.

Throughout the two weeks after the beginning of the natural disaster, the corpses of victims were still being found on the streets, in homes and automobiles. On 26 May 2014, it was announced that the floods and landslides had uncovered mass graves with the skeletal remains of Bosniak victims of the Bosnian War of the 1990s. The mass graves are located in the Usora Municipality and the exact number of victims is as of yet unknown.

== Demographics ==
=== Population ===
Population of settlements – Doboj municipality
	Settlement	1948.	1953.	1961.	1971.	1981.	1991.	2013.
	Total	33,504	56,442	74,956	88,985	99,548	95,213	71,441
1	Boljanić						2,327	1,714
2	Božinci Donji						587	329
3	Brestovo						1,254	644
4	Bukovica Mala						816	752
5	Bukovica Velika						1,481	2,669
6	Bušletić						787	556
7	Čajre						456	289
8	Cerovica						1,701	1,030
9	Čivčije Bukovičke						1,017	658
10	Čivčije Osječanske						538	294
11	Cvrtkovci						897	581
12	Doboj			13,415	18,264	23,558	27,498	26,987
13	Donja Paklenica						764	483
14	Dragalovci						1,031	367
15	Glogovica						714	517
16	Gornja Paklenica						628	398
17	Grabovica						798	598
18	Grapska Donja						494	445
19	Grapska Gornja						2,297	1,334
20	Jelanjska						701	435
21	Kladari						673	520
22	Kostajnica						1,342	1,596
23	Kotorsko						3,295	1,790
24	Kožuhe						1,471	999
25	Lipac						1,018	1,246
26	Ljeb						446	325
27	Ljeskove Vode						821	613
28	Majevac						456	329
29	Makljenovac						2,164	1,165
30	Miljkovac						1,430	838
31	Mitrovići						441	233
32	Opsine						351	230
33	Osječani Donji						821	687
34	Osječani Gornji						1,259	1,084
35	Osojnica						676	369
36	Osredak						605	282
37	Ostružnja Donja						1,130	838
38	Ostružnja Gornja						495	380
39	Paležnica Gornja						342	328
40	Pločnik						304	261
41	Podnovlje						1,239	1,156
42	Potočani						897	605
43	Pridjel Donji						987	841
44	Pridjel Gornji						1,247	777
45	Prnjavor Mali						793	568
46	Radnja Donja						572	368
47	Raškovci						666	460
48	Ritešić						584	327
49	Rječica Donja						302	215
50	Rječica Gornja						483	314
51	Ševarlije						1,792	1,271
52	Sjenina						1,950	1,028
53	Sjenina Rijeka						679	402
54	Stanari						1,299	1,015
55	Stanić Rijeka							1,002
56	Stanovi						1,073	760
57	Striježevica						597	433
58	Suho Polje						924	576
59	Svjetliča						906	614
60	Tekućica						736	630
61	Trnjani						887	609
62	Zarječa						350	293
63	Zelinja Gornja							274

=== Ethnic composition ===
Ethnic composition – Doboj city
	2013.	1991.	1981.	1971.
Total	26,987 (100,0%)	27,498 (100,0%)	23 558 (100,0%)	18,264 (100,0%)
Bosniaks	3,797 (15,1%)	11,154 (40,56%)	8,822 (37,45%)	8,976 (49,15%)
Serbs	19,586 (77,9%)	8,011 (29,13%)	6,091 (25,86%)	5,044 (27,62%)
Yugoslavs		4,365 (15,87%)	5,211 (22,12%)	919 (5,032%)
Croats	704 (2,8%)	2,714 (9,870%)	2,852 (12,11%)	2,889 (15,82%)
Others	1,045 (4,2%)	1 254 (4,560%)	234 (0,993%)	169 (0,925%)
Montenegrins			171 (0,726%)	175 (0,958%)
Roma			76 (0,323%)	1 (0,005%)
Albanian			54 (0,229%)	35 (0,192%)
Macedonians			20 (0,085%)	15 (0,082%)
Slovenes			16 (0,068%)	25 (0,137%)
Hungarians			11 (0,047%)	16 (0,088%)

Ethnic composition – Doboj municipality
	2013.	1991.	1981.	1971.
Total	71,441 (100,0%)	95,213 (100,0%)	99,548 (100,0%)	88,985 (100,0%)
Serbs	52,628 (73,67%)	39,820 (38,83%)	39,224 (39,40%)	39,884 (44,82%)
Bosniaks	15,322 (21,45%)	41,164 (40,14%)	35,742 (35,90%)	32,418 (36,43%)
Croats	1,845 (2,583%)	13,264 (12,93%)	14,522 (14,59%)	14,754 (16,58%)
Others	1,646 (2,304%)	2,536 (2,473%)	1,043 (1,048%)	453 (0,509%)
Yugoslavs		5,765 (5,622%)	8,549 (8,588%)	1,124 (1,263%)
Montenegrins			225 (0,226%)	214 (0,240%)
Albanians			95 (0,095%)	60 (0,067%)
Roma			76 (0,076%)	1 (0,001%)
Macedonians			32 (0,032%)	28 (0,031%)
Slovenes			26 (0,026%)	30 (0,034%)
Hungarians			14 (0,014%)	19 (0,021%)

=== Urban area by settlements (1991) ===
- Bare: 732 (62%) Serbs; 153 (13%) Yugoslavs; 135 (11%) Croats; 112 (9%) Bosniaks; 53 (4%) others, 1,185 total
- Centar: 3,720 (35%) Serbs; 3,365 (31%) Bosniaks; 1,982 (18%) Yugoslavs; 1,236 (12%) Croats; 432 (4%) others, 10,735 total
- Čaršija: 3,561 (72%) Bosniaks; 594 (12%) Yugoslavs; 303 (6%) Serbs; 195 (4%) Croats; 273 (6%) others, 4,926 total
- Doboj Novi: 358 (48%) Bosniaks; 237 (32%) Serbs; 39 (5%) Yugoslavs; 7 (1%) Croats; 108 (14%) others, 749 total
- Donji Grad: 1,879 (37%) Serbs; 1,547 (31%) Bosniaks; 844 (17%) Yugoslavs; 569 (11%) Croats; 196 (4%) others, 5,035 total
- Orašje: 1,411 (66%) Bosniaks; 293 (14%) Serbs; 231 (11%) Yugoslavs; 111 (5%) Croats, 90 (4%) others, 2,136 total
- Usora: 924 (33%) Serbs; 779 (28%) Bosniaks; 502 (18%) Croats; 491 (17%) Yugoslavs; 117 (4%) others, 2,813 total

== Economy ==
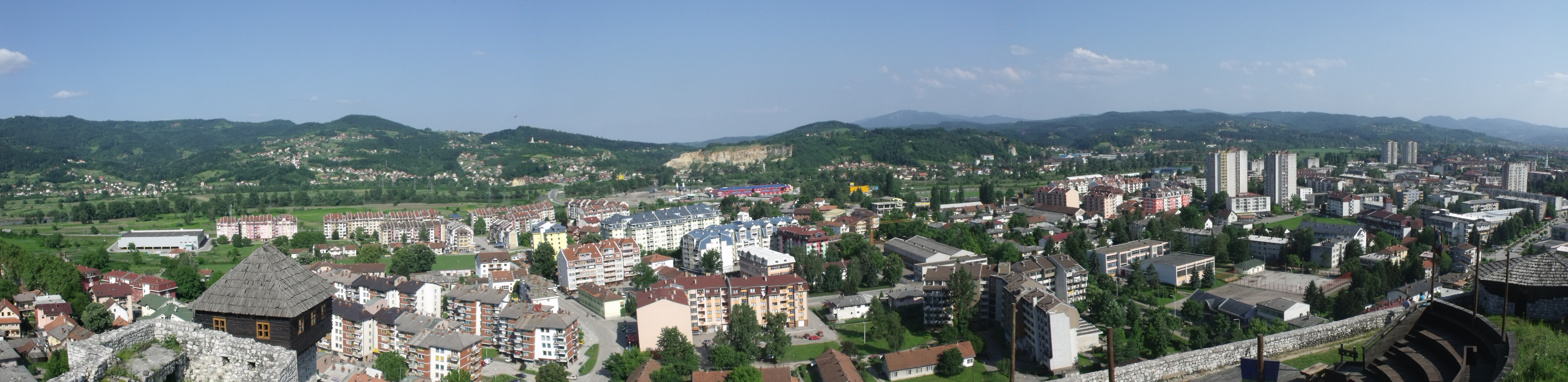
Panoramic view of Doboj from the Doboj Fortress.

As a railway hub, before the Bosnian War, Doboj focused much of its industrial activities around it. Moreover, as a regional center, it was home to several factories, now mostly bankrupt from mismanagement or privatization, including "Bosanka Doboj", a fruit and vegetable produce factory; "Trudbenik", a maker of air compressors and equipment, etc. Nowadays, most of the economy, similar to the rest of the country and typical for the poorly executed transition from state-controlled to a market economy, is based around the service industry. High unemployment warrants a vibrant coffee shop and bar scene, crowded throughout most of the day and night (it is commonly believed that Doboj is one of the top three cities having the largest number of cafes and bars/pubs within city limits in Bosnia & Herzegovina).

In 1981, Doboj's GDP per capita was 53% of the Yugoslav average.

Economic preview

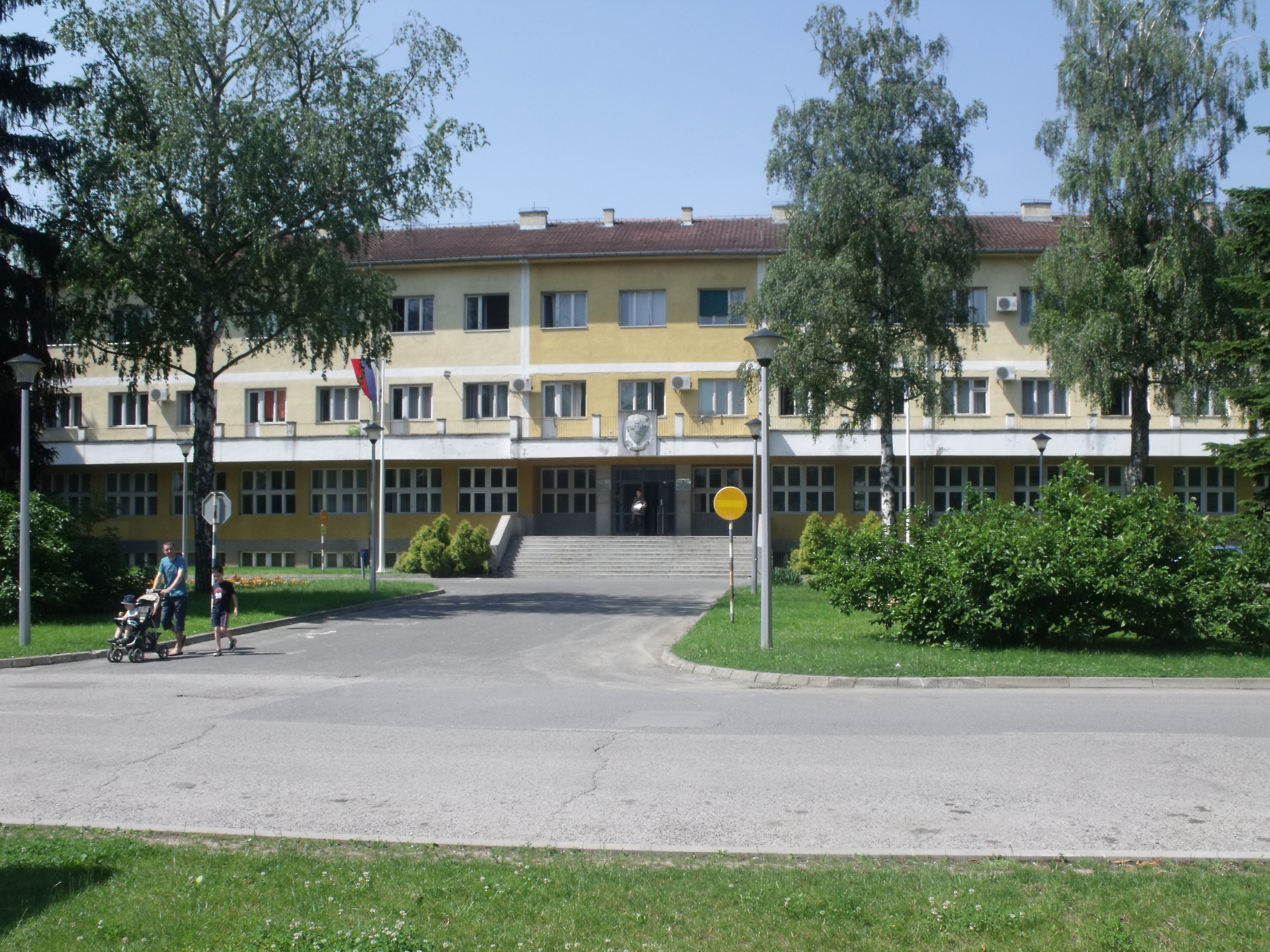
Doboj Municipal Assembly

The following table gives a preview of total number of registered people employed in professional fields per their core activity (as of 2018):

Professional field	Total
Agriculture, forestry and fishing	166
Mining and quarrying	108
Manufacturing	1,061
Electricity, gas, steam and air conditioning supply	340
Water supply; sewerage, waste management and remediation activities	223
Construction	733
Wholesale and retail trade, repair of motor vehicles and motorcycles	2,446
Transportation and storage	1,600
Accommodation and food services	605
Information and communication	230
Financial and insurance activities	248
Real estate activities	1
Professional, scientific and technical activities	261
Administrative and support service activities	321
Public administration and defense; compulsory social security	1,226
Education	1,208
Human health and social work activities	1,315
Arts, entertainment and recreation	50
Other service activities	338
Total	12,480

== Transportation ==
The city is the region's primary railroad junction, going south to Ploče on the Adriatic Sea, west to Banja Luka and Zagreb, north to Vinkovci, Croatia, and east to Tuzla, Bijeljina and Zvornik. A highway toward western RS and Banja Luka has been completed and opened since 2018.

== Society ==
=== Education ===
Doboj hosts the private Slobomir P University, with several colleges like the Faculty of information technology; the Faculty of economics and management; the Faculty of philology; the Faculty of law; a Fiscal Academy and the Academy of Arts. Doboj also seats the Mechanical and Electrical Engineering Technical School, as well as several specialized high schools.

Doboj also hosts the public Faculty of Transport and Traffic Engineering, a branch of the University of East Sarajevo with several departments: Road & Urban Transport; Rail Transport; Postal Transport; Telecommunication and Logistics. Since the 2015/2016 academic year, it has opened new departments: Air Transport; Roads; IT Transport and Motor Vehicles.

=== Sport ===
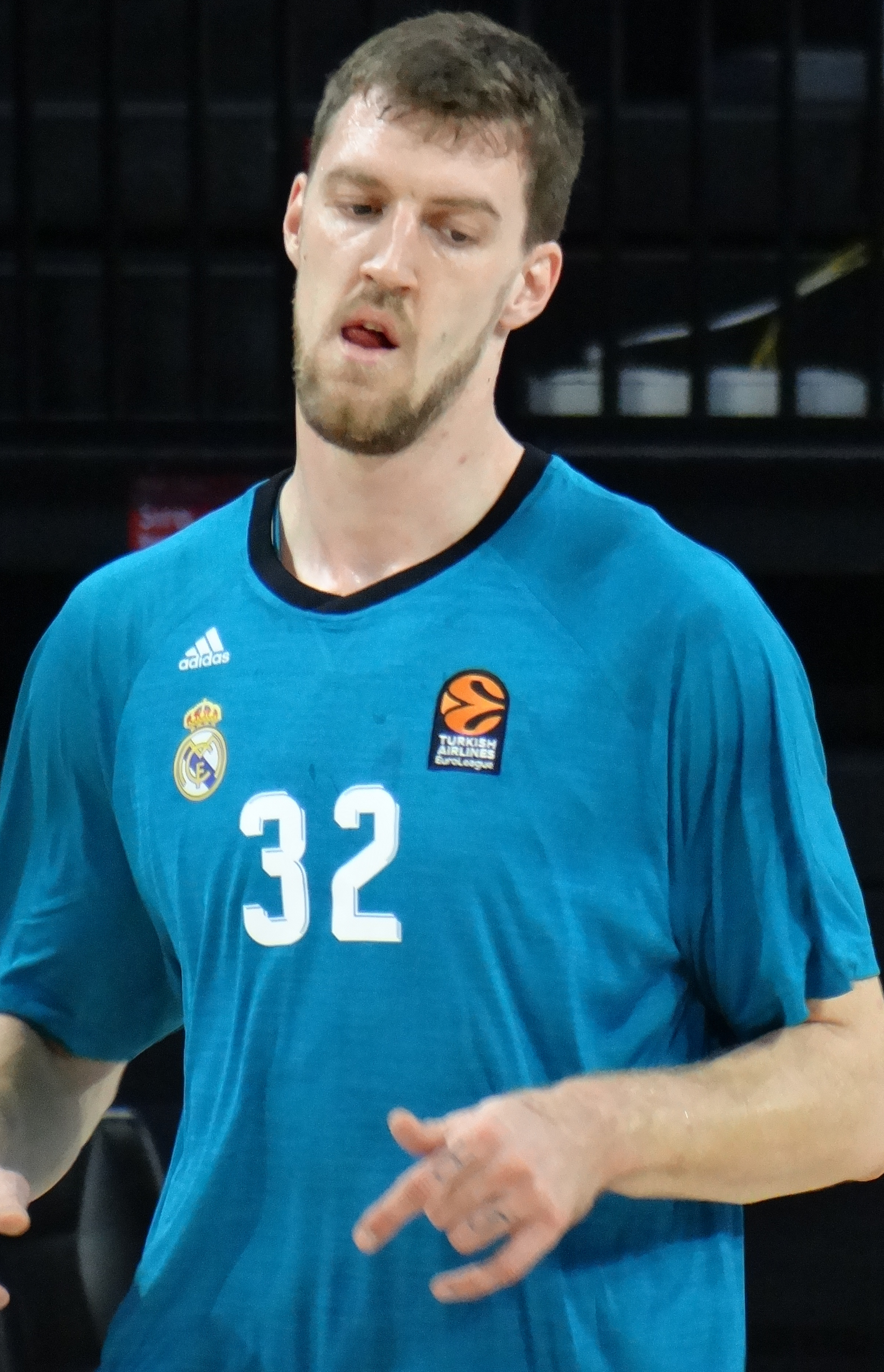
Ognjen Kuzmić, a basketball player, 2015 NBA champion and 2017 EuroBasket silver medalist

The local football club, Sloga Doboj, plays in the First League of the Republika Srpska. The town's favourite sport, however, is handball. The local handball club is Sloga Doboj. Sloga Doboj ranks among the country's top teams and consistently qualifies for international competitions. Very importantly, Doboj traditionally hosts "The Annual Doboj International Champions' Handball Tournament" every year during the last days of August. Its 55th tournament was in 2023 and once again. The prestige of this EHF-listed tournament was consistently strong enough to attract the most important names in the European team handball over the past five decades such as: Barcelona, Grasshopper, Gummersbach, Ademar León, CSKA, Steaua, Dinamo București, Atlético Madrid, Red Star, Metaloplastika, Partizan, Pelister, Nordhorn, Pick Szeged, Veszprém, Göppingen, Montpellier, d'Ivry and Chekhovski Medvedi.

== Symbol ==
The four squares represent the four mountains which mark the outer borders of the Doboj valley in which the City of Doboj lies in: Ozren, Trebava, Vučjak, and Krnjin. The fleur-de-lis represent the medieval origins of the city in the royal fortress Gradina built by the kings from the medieval Bosnian dynasty of Kotromanić.

== Notable places ==
- The Doboj Fortress from the early thirteenth century, looking over the town.
- A Roman military camp (Castrum) from the first century AD (right above the confluence of the Usora and the Bosna rivers)
- Goransko Jezero, lake and recreation park in the vicinity of town.

== Notable people ==
- Aleksandar Đurić, Singapore footballer
- Bojan Šarčević, basketball player
- Borislav Paravac, politician
- Danijel Pranjić, Croatian footballer
- Danijel Šarić, Bosnian-Qatari handball player
- Dina Bajraktarević, singer
- Dino Djulbic, Australian footballer
- Dragan Mikerević, politician
- Fahrudin Omerović, footballer
- Igor Vukojević, singer
- Indira Radić, singer
- Izet Sarajlić, poet
- Jasmin Džeko, footballer
- Krešimir Zubak, politician
- Mirsada Bajraktarević, singer
- Nenad Marković, basketball player
- Ognjen Kuzmić, Serbian basketball player
- Pero Bukejlović, politician
- Sejad Halilović, former footballer
- Silvana Armenulić, singer
- Spomenko Gostić, soldier
- Vladimir Tica, Serbian basketball player
- Vlastimir Jovanović, footballer
- Zoran Kvržić, footballer
- Aidin Mahmutović, footballer
- Zdenko Križić, Croatian Roman Catholic prelate
- Benjamin Burić, handball goalkeeper
- Senjamin Burić, handballer

== Twin towns – sister cities ==
Doboj is twinned with:

- Celje, Slovenia (1965)
- Ćuprija, Serbia
