= Tolisa (river) =

- Location within Bosnia and Herzegovina

Location
- Country: Bosnia and Herzegovina

Physical characteristics
- Source
  - location: on the slopes of Trebava
- Mouth
  - location: Sava, between Tolisa, Orašje and Domaljevac
  - coordinates: 45°03′25″N 18°38′43″E
- Length: 56.2 km (34.9 mi)

Basin features
- Progression: Sava→ Danube→ Black Sea

Tolisa is a river in Bosnia and Herzegovina, a right tributary Sava. It is 56.2 kilometers long. It springs on the slopes of Trebava at an altitude of 440 meters, and flows into the Sava between Tolisa, Orašje and Domaljevac. The altitude of the estuary is 81 meters.

The other village in Bosnia called Tolisa, Modriča is located to the southwest where the upstream part of this river is in the Bosna watershed. A lateral canal was built in 1973 that routed mountain streams near Modriča into the Bosna in order to prevent flooding.
