= Fortress of Doboj =

Fort in Bosnia and Herzegovina

Gradina Fortress
- Doboj, Republika Srpska in Bosnia and Herzegovina
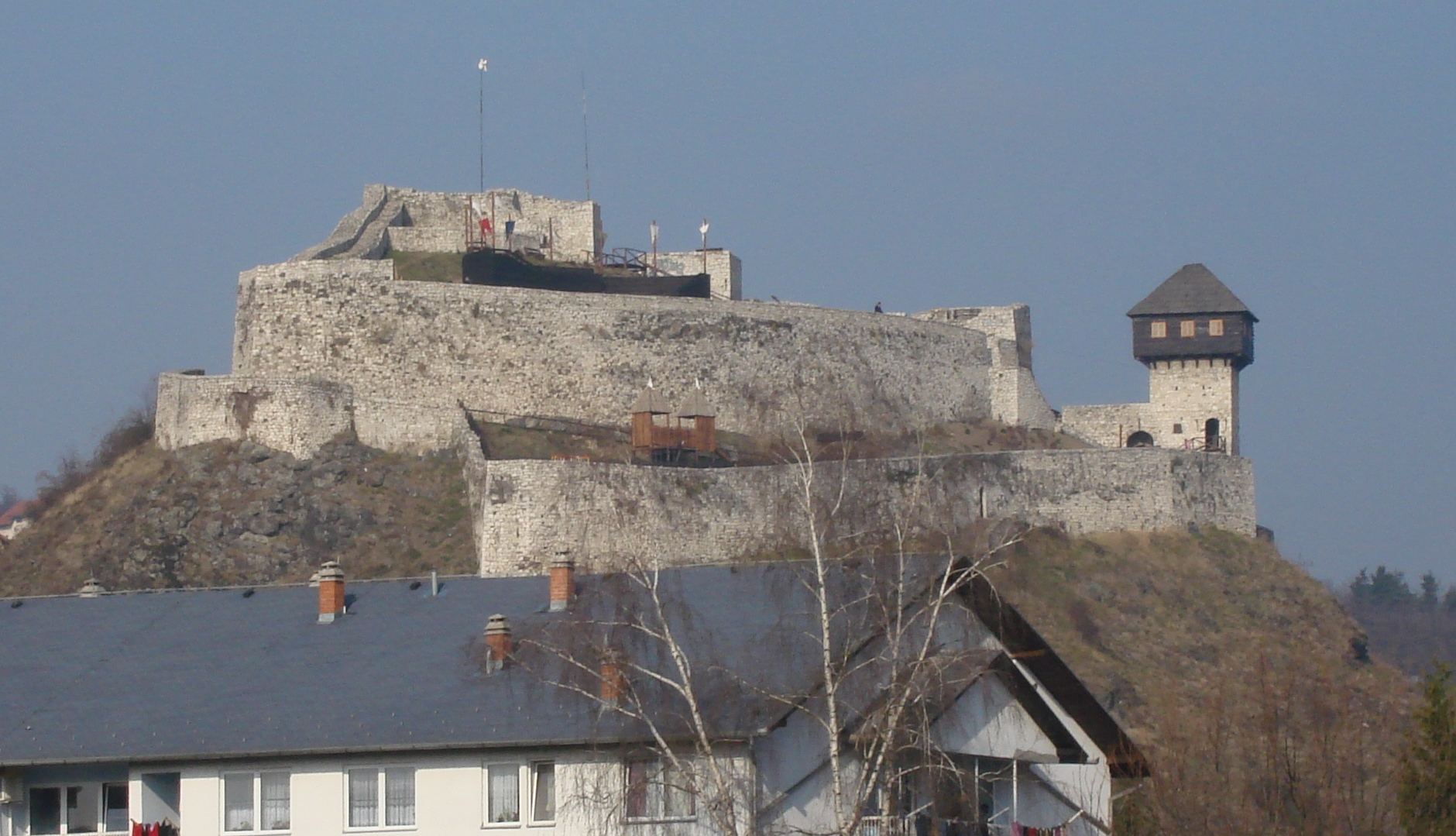
- Doboj Fortress

Site information
- Type: Hilltop castle
- Owner: The Government of Bosnia and Herzegovina
- Controlled by: Bosnian Kingdom (1230-1476): Ottoman Empire (1476-1878); Austria-Hungary (1878–1918)
- Condition: Repaired (Protected as National Monument of Bosnia and Herzegovina)

Location
- Coordinates: 44.737°N 18.088°E

Site history
- Built: 13th century
- Built by: Duke of Usora
- In use: until at least 1945
- Materials: hewn stone (ashlar)
- Battles/wars: Battle of Doboj

Garrison information
- Designations

KONS of Bosnia and Herzegovina
- Official name: Old Doboj fortr, the architectural ensemble
- Type: Category II cultural and historical property
- Criteria: A, B, C i.vi., D i.ii.iv., F ii., G i.v., I i.
- Designated: 31 August 2005 (?th session)
- Reference no.: 2583
- Decision no.: 05.2-2-203/05-6
- State: National Monuments of Bosnia and Herzegovina

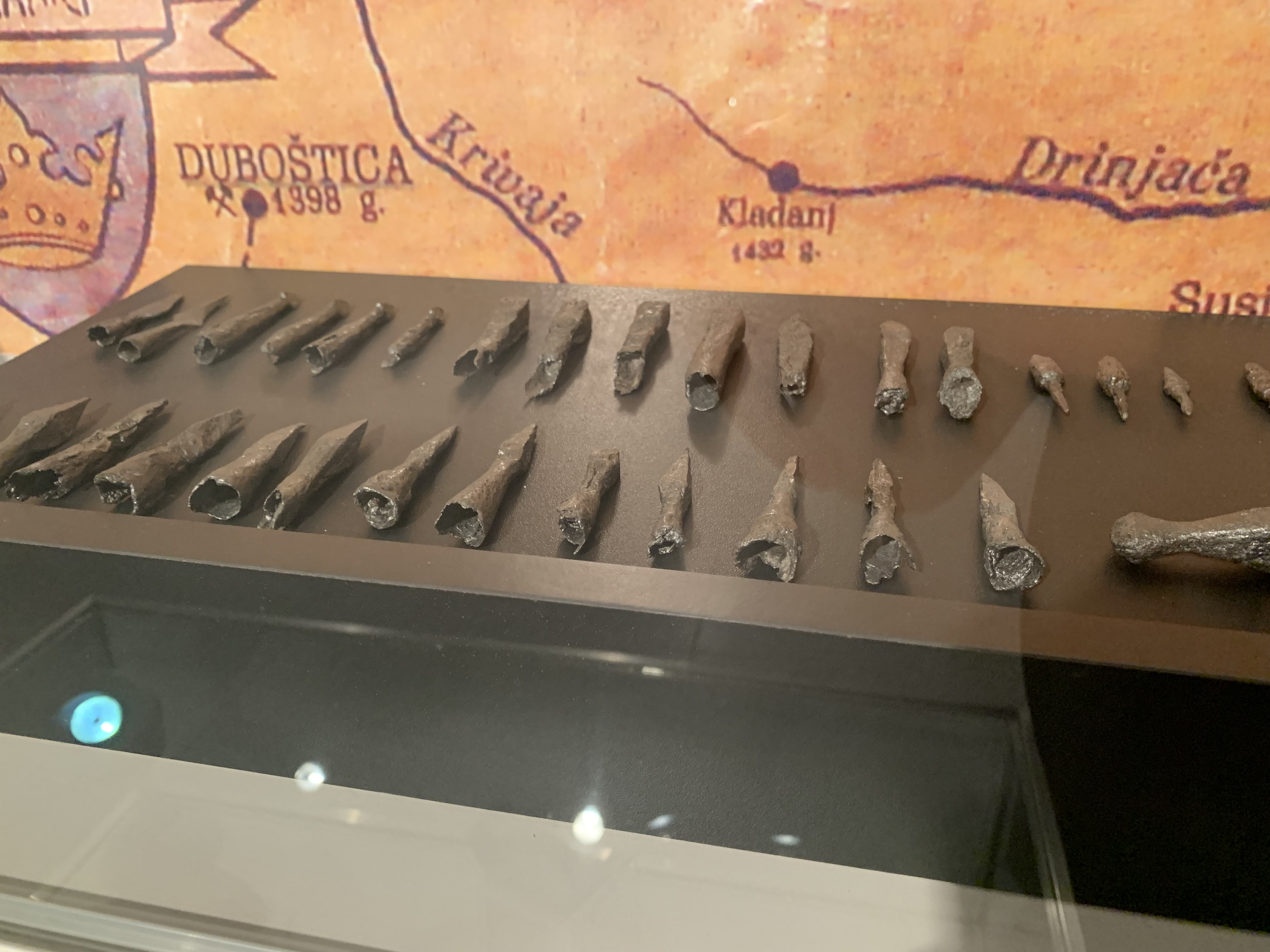
Arrowheads and crossbow projectiles from Doboj fortress (Regional Museum in Doboj)

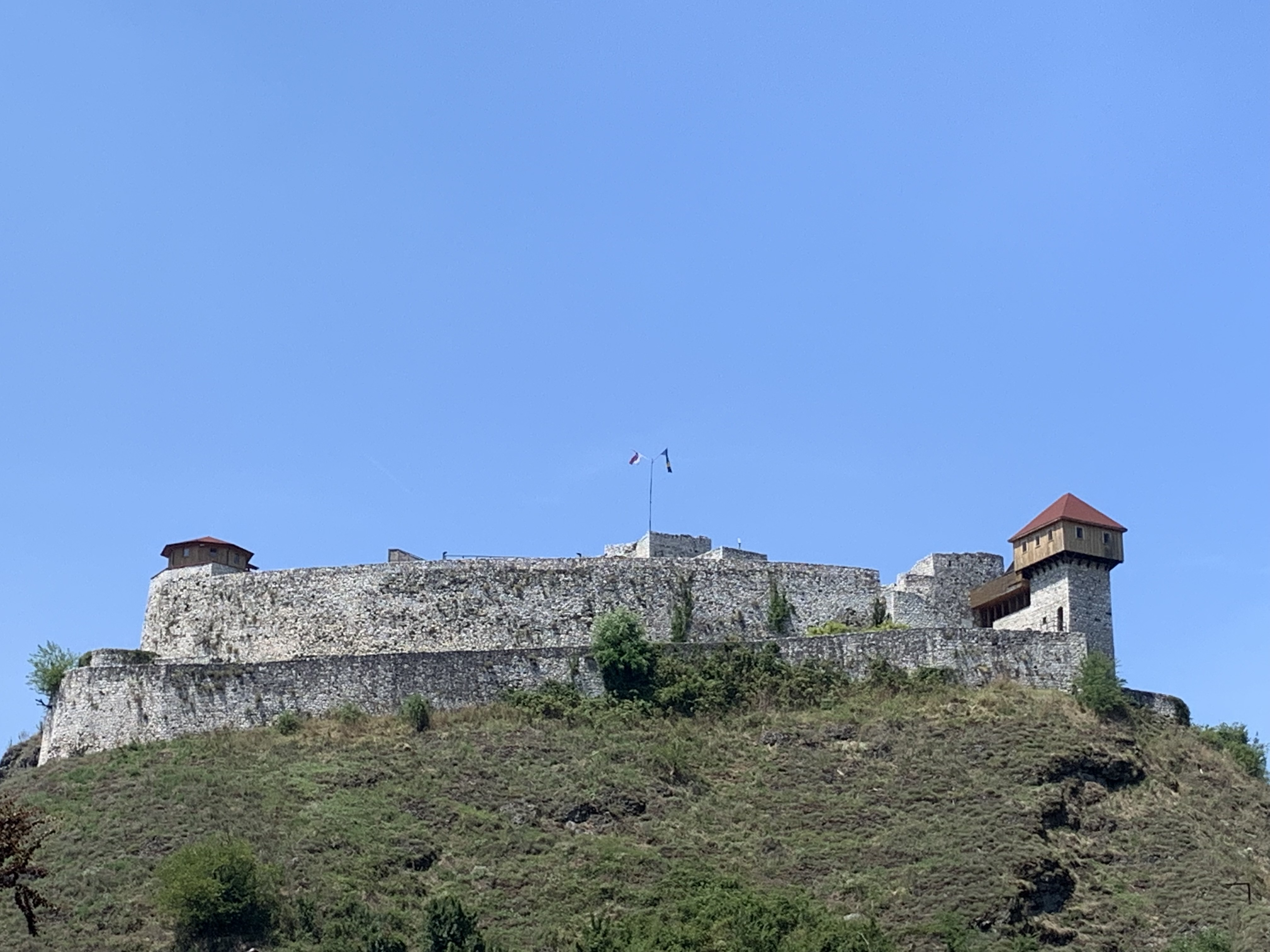
Doboj Fortress - downtown view

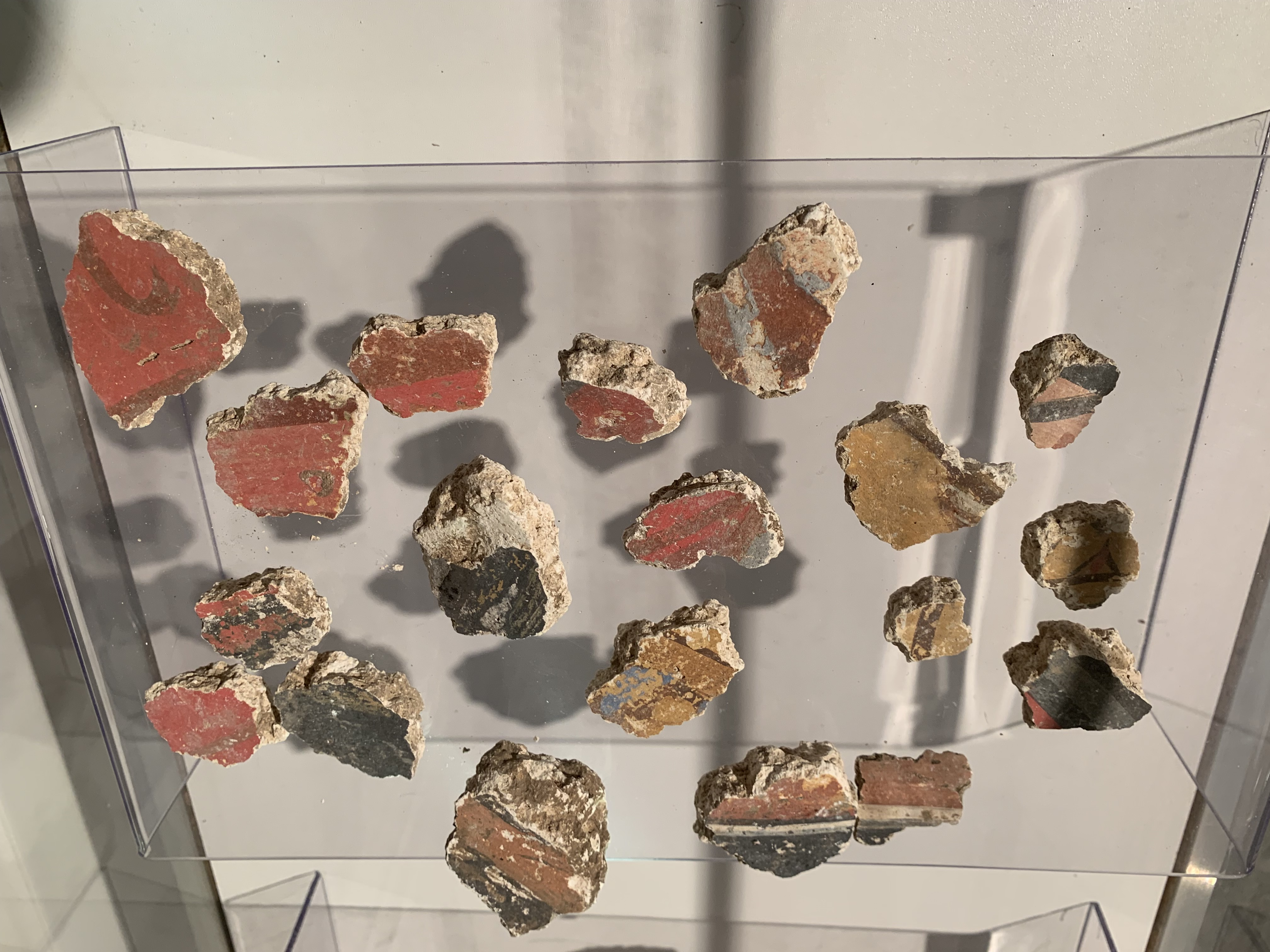
Ceramics and pottery excavated from the economy building in 2017

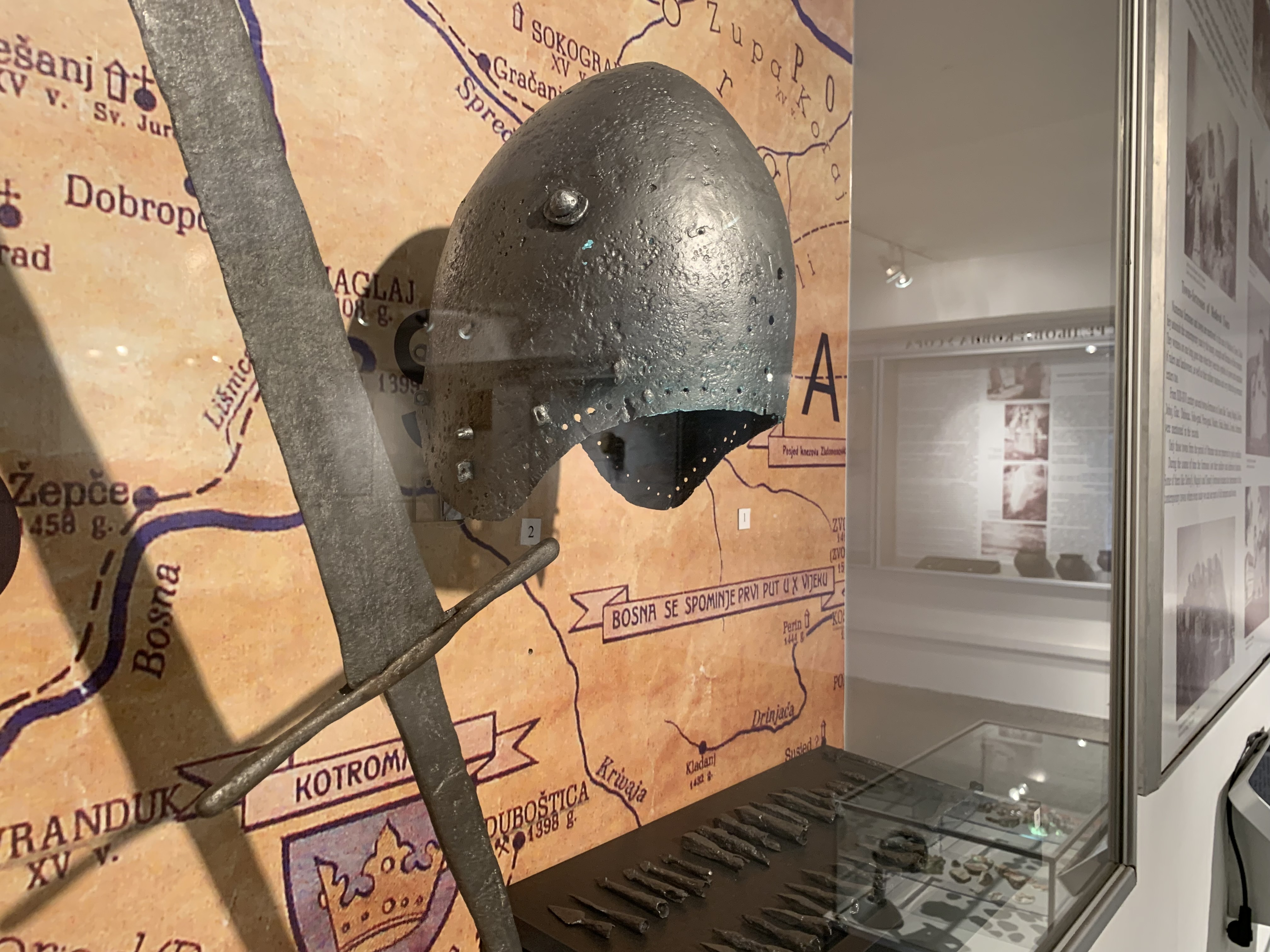
Bascinet helmet and sword on display in Regional Museum in Doboj - weaponry commonly used during the Battle of Doboj in 1415

Doboj Fortress (Bosnian, Croatian and Serbian: Dobojska tvrđava / Добојска тврђава) or Gradina (Градина) is located in the city of Doboj, Bosnia and Herzegovina. Throughout its turbulent history, the fortress has been burned and ransacked at least 18 times as per official records. Of note is that Doboj fortress was considered to be a royal Kotromanić property, unlike Great Bosnian Duke Hrvoje's Zvečaj fortress or Sandalj Hranić's Blagaj fortress, which were centers of their respective duchies.

== History ==
=== Construction ===
One of the most important defenses in the medieval banate/duchy of Usora, this large stone structure was built in the early 13th century on the site of an earlier, clay and wood-based structure from the 10th or 11th century. In the first period of its existence, from early 13th to about early 15th century (1415), the fortress was built in the Romanesque architecture style.

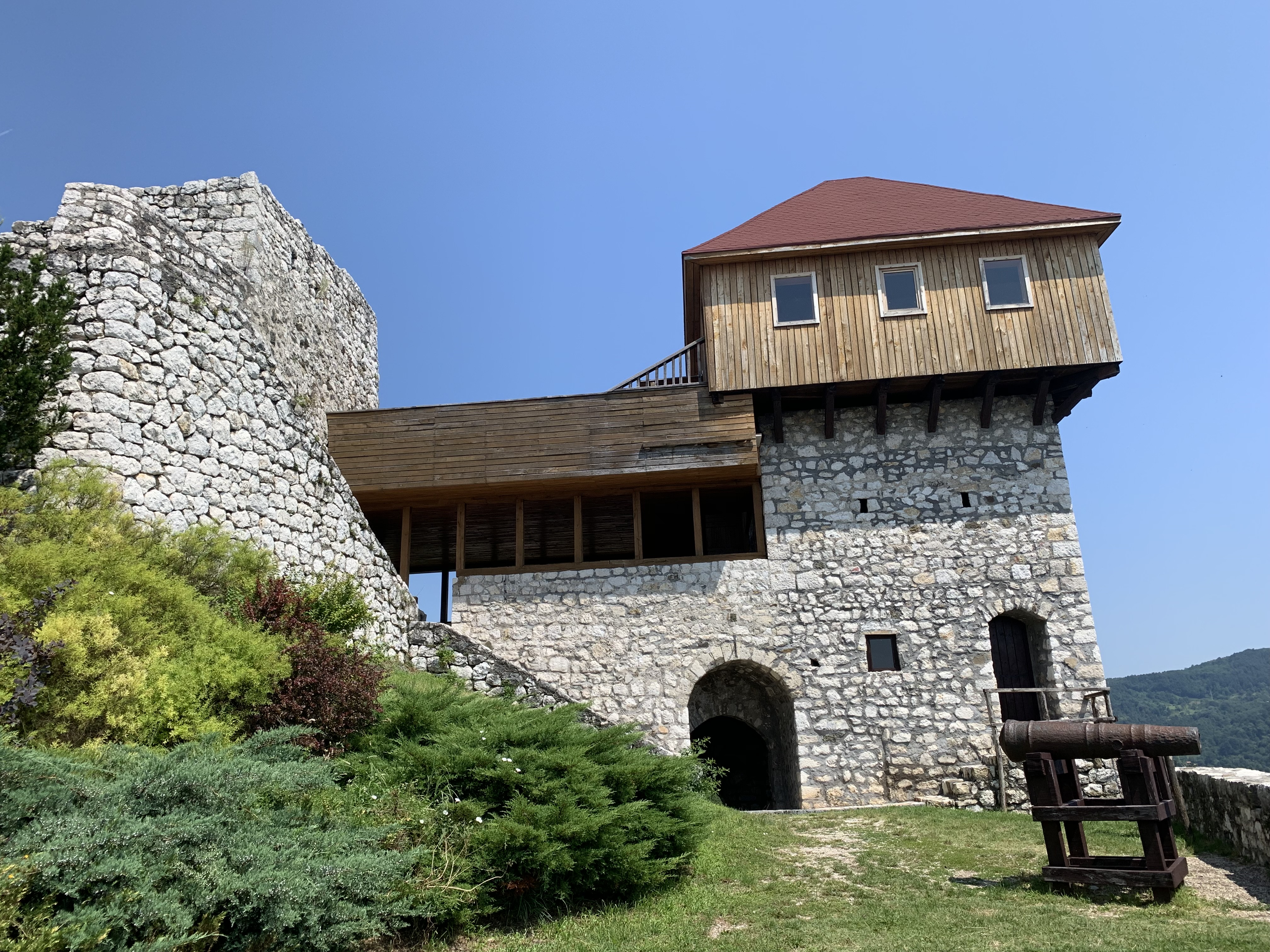
The watchtower and lower fort

Doboj fortress underwent a major reconstruction in the spring of 1415. While still retaining some of its original Romanesque elements, the fortress now displayed Gothic structure and had its large keep reinforced with thick walls - up to 3 feet or about 1 meter thick at the Eastern wall. Northern tower received an addition of a bastion/plateau with six cannon. The captain's tower was turned into even more dominating feature, a 5-stories tall donjon. Its perfectly square base and considerable height were not typical for Usora castles of the time. Moreover, additional outer walls were built around the original triangular core and three big towers (Northern, Eastern, and Southern Gate) have been strengthened as well. These towers strategically protected flanks of the fortress, hence rendering any idea of an attack a suicidal attempt. The Southern tower's walls, in particular, were changed into round shape in order to deflect cannonballs (circa 1370-1380s) and local captains at the time used Dubrovnik-made cannons, bombards, and balistas as the fortress' main defense weaponry. Since early 14th century, there was a small contingent permanently stationed at the fortress and it was armed with swords, lances, halberds, bows, crossbows, and later on, handguns. Much of the weaponry was locally made but finer equipment was imported from Germany, Venice, and Dubrovnik. The latter was known as Republic of Ragusa at the time and its merchants travelled and traded regularly throughout medieval Usora and Bosnia. Ragusan engineers also built the water cistern in the upper fort of Doboj.

The fortress served as the focal point guarding the entry into Bosnia proper as it overlooks Doboj valley where Posavina flatlands gradually turn into hills and mountains of central Bosnia. Its strategic position controlled the roads leading north towards Croatia, east along Spreca river towards Region Soli and Drina valley towards Serbia, and south along Usora river and towards Bosnian mainland. The fortress frequently changed hands in the wars between Bosnia and Hungary from 13th through early 15th century. The town population lived in houses along several main streets huddled around the central paved square built in Mediterranean fashion and the size of this old settlement has not grown significantly between early 13th to mid 19th century. At the first signal of impending attack, the town population would leave Doboj settlement and seek safety in the fortress. The entire Usora region was rich in natural resources and due to its accessible location, constantly under the threat from northern Hungarian neighbor. Particularly notable battles in Usora, including Doboj, occurred in 1363, 1394, 1398, 1405, 1406, 1407, 1408, 1412, and 1415.

=== Role in Battle of Doboj ===
In the early August of 1415, Bosnian nobility with its armies under command of The Great Bosnian Duke Hrvoje Vukčić Hrvatinić in the coalition with Ottoman Turks under Isa-Beg fought the Hungarians in the Battle of Doboj. During this campaign the Hungarians under Johannes de Gara (Eng: John Garai, Serb: Ivan Gorjanski) and Johannes de Maroth (Serb: Ivan Morovic) had their main camp established on the field right under the fortress of Doboj. Here they set up camp and patiently waited since early June 1415 until most of the army finally gathered, pouring down from Hungary proper and Slavonia and as far away as Germany, Bohemia, Lithuania, and Poland. Some of the units and weaponry were transported to the main Hungarian camp via boats, from river Sava down to river Bosna, which at that time flowed directly under the fortress (“...qualiter die XVI husus Johannes de Ghara cum multus gentibus scuritatis vestie appulerat in Uxora subtus castrum Dobuy qui ut fertur venit versus Bosnam”, Ragusan Council letter sent to Emperor Sigismund, dated June 28th 1415) . The actual battle took place around August 10th 1415 primarily in the area of Makljenovac, some 5 kilometers due south. The heaviest fighting occurred on the central plateau of the village Sevarlije, just across the river Bosna from Makljenovac proper.

Approximately 15,000 Hungarians spread into three banderia faced the united Bosnian nobility which brought 10,000 knights and men-at-arms to the battlefield. To Hungarian dismay and against their expectations, most important Bosnian overlords - Hrvoje Vukčić, Sandalj Hranić, Pavle Radenović, and Vuk Zlatonosović from Usora Banate were present with their contingents. Among them, they had several thousand modern heavy cavalry, some units of light cavalry, and majority were men-at-arms. In addition, there was a large contingent, of close to 15,000 Ottoman Turks under Isa-Beg that came to fight on the Bosnian side, arriving just in time from direction of Zenica and Lasva Valley. Encroaching Ottomans were already a real threat to Southeastern Europe since the fall of Serbian Empire in 1371. They were actively meddling in medieval Bosnian affairs since early 1400s. However, as it was typical of the fickle politics in High Middle Ages in Europe, Bosnians gladly accepted Ottoman help this time in order to hit back at Hungarians which were incessantly waging wars and Crusades against them for the better part of last two centuries. After careful positioning on the battlefield, the heavy cavalry charge opened the battle, with the smaller pockets of close quarter fighting subsequently developing on gentle slopes of the area set amidst rivers Bosna and Usora. As it happened, Hungarians were heavily defeated in this battle, with most of the present Hungarian high nobility captured and ransomed later on, and they were not to undertake any major offensive against the Ottomans or Bosnian kingdom until the Second Battle of Kosovo in 1448.

=== More history ===
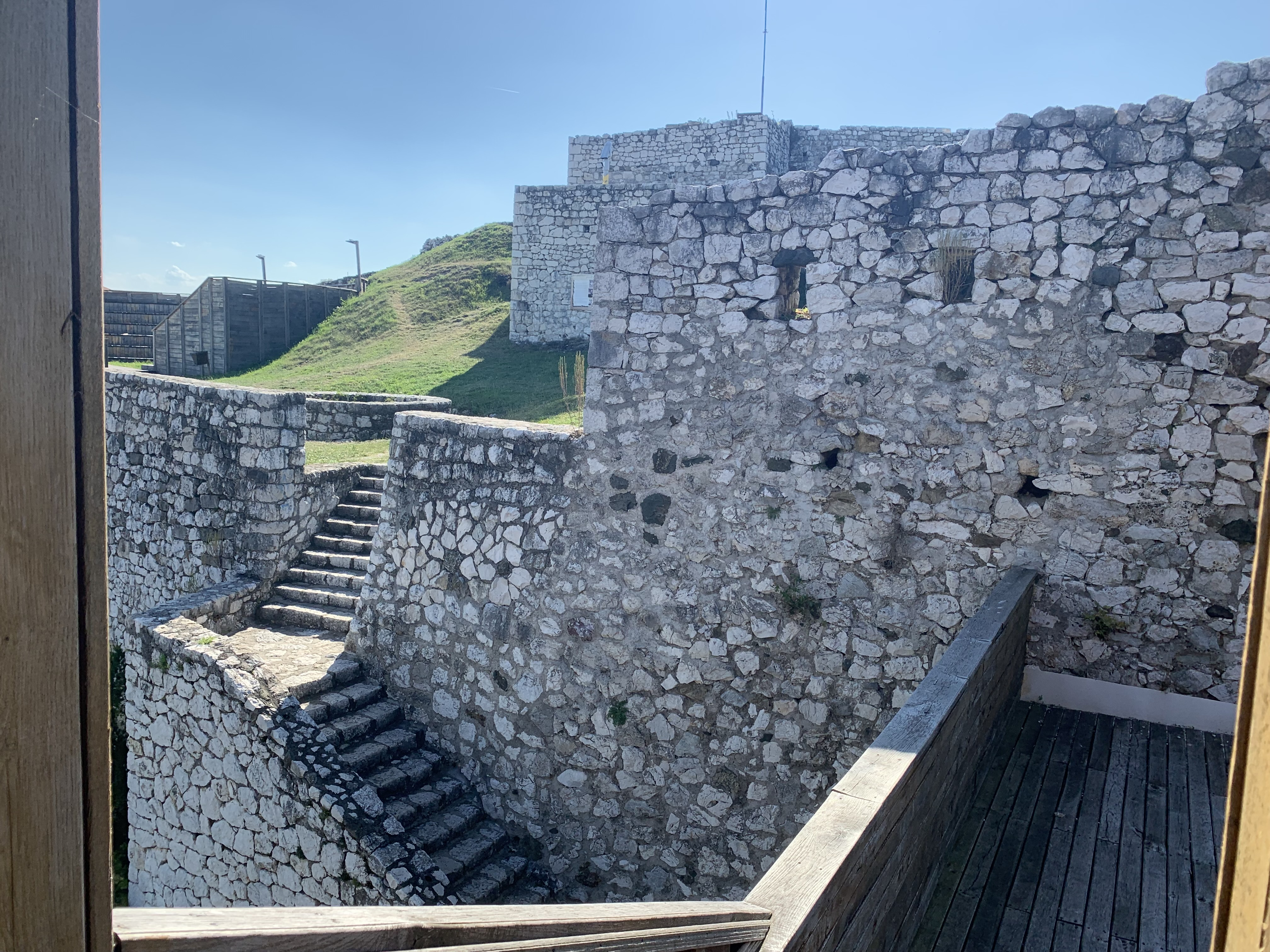
Eastern gate and the entrance to upper fort

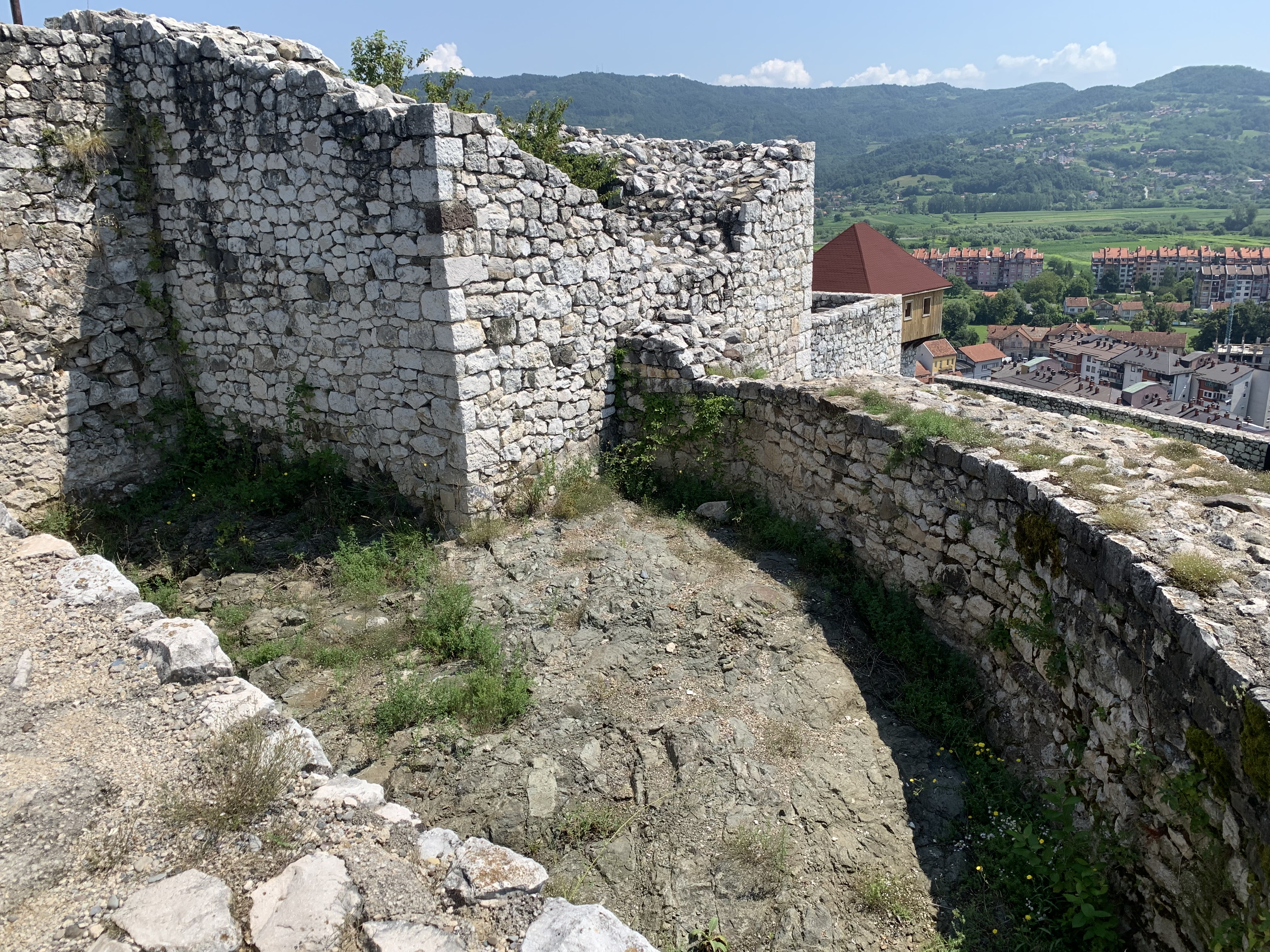
Remnants of economy building in forefront and donjon in the background

Turks had conquered the city of Doboj and its fortress in 1476 and in following decades had the fortress completely reconstructed and gave it a new shape by adding the second outer wall and additional structures. Particularly large works were done in the early summer of 1490 where some 1,500 men were employed under master-builder Ibrahim. The reconstruction work took 50 days. This was necessary from a strategic point of view, as the northernmost borders of Ottoman Empire at that time were positioned in line Jajce-Doboj-Srebrenik. It appears that the fortress was briefly retaken by Hungarian and Bosnian forces loyal to short lived Hungarian-backed Jajce Banate (1463-1528). However, as officially recorded, from 1503 the old town Doboj and its nearby fortress are firmly in Ottomans' hands until 1878. In the Austrian/Turkish war (1697) Doboj fortress had been sacked and burnt by Prince Eugene of Savoy and his Austrian armies on the march to Sarajevo. The fortress had been conquered and burnt by Austrians again in the summer of 1717. In 1740, Turks added a torture chamber to the fortress's interior but its garrison at the time consisted of only 40+ standing soldiers. Doboj fortress gradually lost its military significance in the late 18th century as the Turkish borders shifted dramatically in the Austrian/Turkish Wars, and later Napoleonic wars on Balkans and elsewhere.

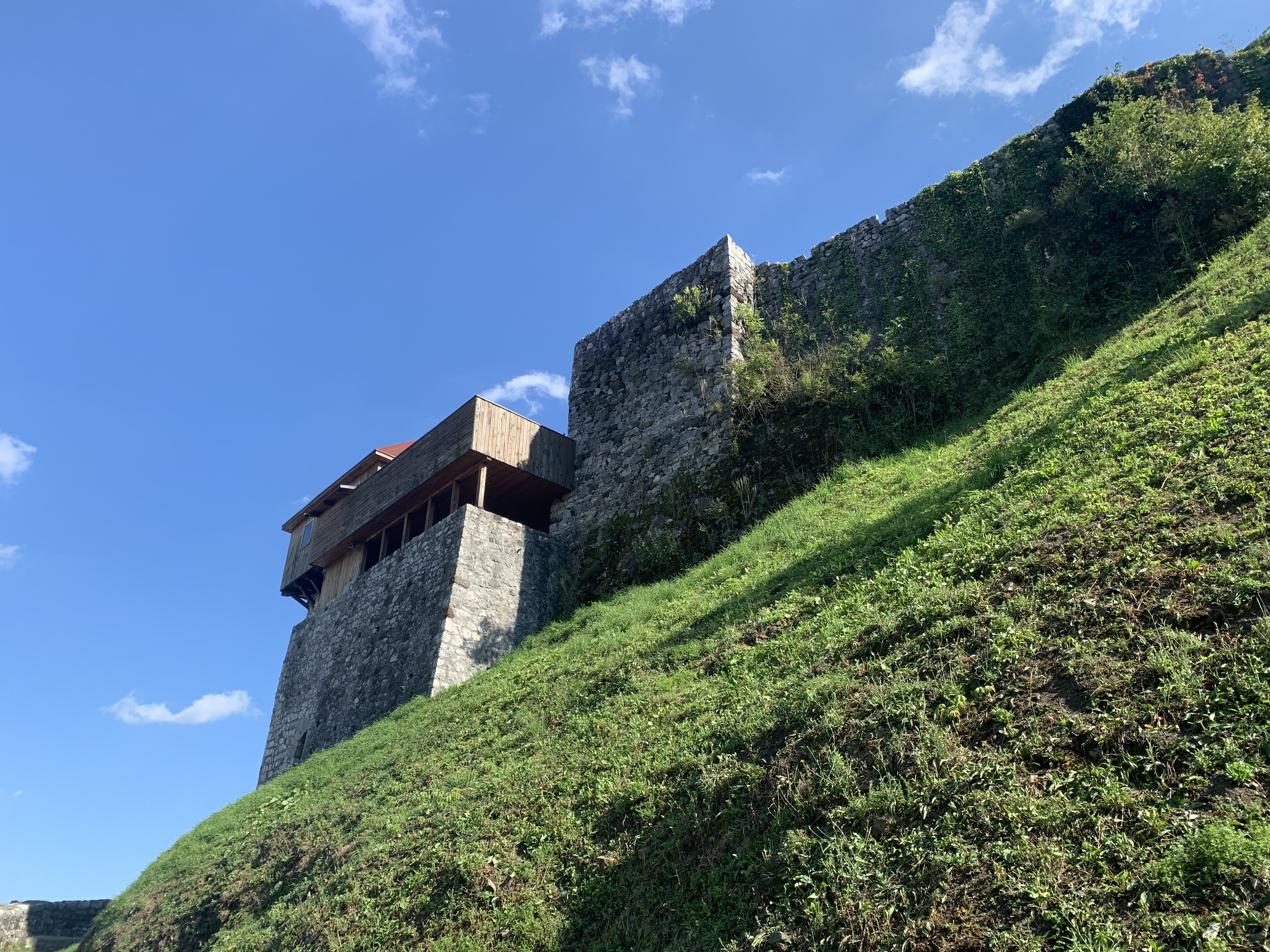
Eastern gate and watchtower

=== Capture by Austro-Hungarians and Role in World Wars ===
In 1878, Austro-Hungarian army captured the fortress after a very heavy and prolonged battle with a local population, mostly Bosnian muslims (Bosniaks today). A-H army had losses of nearly 1,000 soldiers killed in the battle around Doboj in the late summer of 1878, on its way to Sarajevo, and as it tried to establish hold in Northern Bosnia.

While strategically obsolete, of note is that fortress remained in use by A-H forces in WWI and it stationed a strong Croatian Ustasha and German Wehrmacht unit in WWII. This unit remained firmly entrenched on the fortress throughout the entire war. Members of German forces built additional impromptu bunkers surrounded by concertina wire in the early summer of 1941, and due to its location and firepower, Serbian villagers were unable to take this object during their uprising on August 23, 1941 while they successfully captured all other objects and installations throughout the city and completely destroyed remaining barricaded German/Ustasha units in Doboj and surrounding area. Several thousands Serb rebels, already under heavy Croatian Ustasha oppression since April 10 and establishment of Independent State of Croatia, managed to hold onto the city for 48 hours before being forced back across river Bosna as German armored units entered Doboj from Derventa/Brod and Tuzla area. In retreating through the streets of Doboj, they were under constant heavy fire from the fortress and had multiple casualties.

On the evening of September 9th 1944, in coordinated action, 14th Central-Bosnian Partisan Brigade and 21st Slavonian Partisan Brigade attacked Doboj and took most of the city by the following morning. However, they were once again unable to take Doboj fortress as strong Wehrmacht units and SS-Prinz Eugen anti-armored battalion (SS-Sturmgeschutz Battalion 7) defended it ferociously. The very last shots were fired from the fortress in early morning hours of April 17, 1945, as the elements of Yugoslav Partisan 53rd Division and 14th Central-Bosnian Partisan Brigade stormed into the city from Southern and Eastern lines of defense.

=== Today ===
Despite some damages suffered from shelling during the Bosnian War, the fortress is very well preserved. There were several attempts at conservation and research of the castle grounds, the largest one taking place in 1962. Unfortunately, the interior was briefly vandalized in early 2010s but the grounds were renovated again soon thereafter. More recently, in 2016-2017, new works took place in partial conservation of the fortress along with new archeological diggings revealing medieval arrowheads and crossbow projectiles, pieces of clay and glass and decorative pottery, and both elements of crude and fine metal work. The lower layers of three flanking towers, in particular, remain inadequately researched with much more potential for future digs and detailed and long lasting conversation of this historical structure. Doboj Fortress is one of the most important cultural-historical National Monuments of Bosnia and Herzegovina.

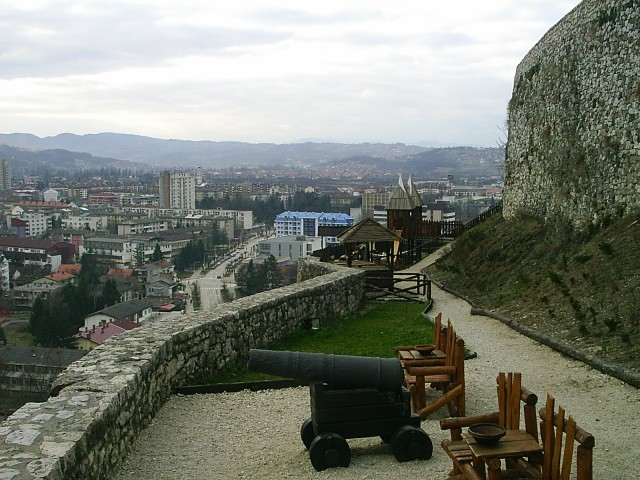
View of the ramparts and tourist facilities, in the 2000s.

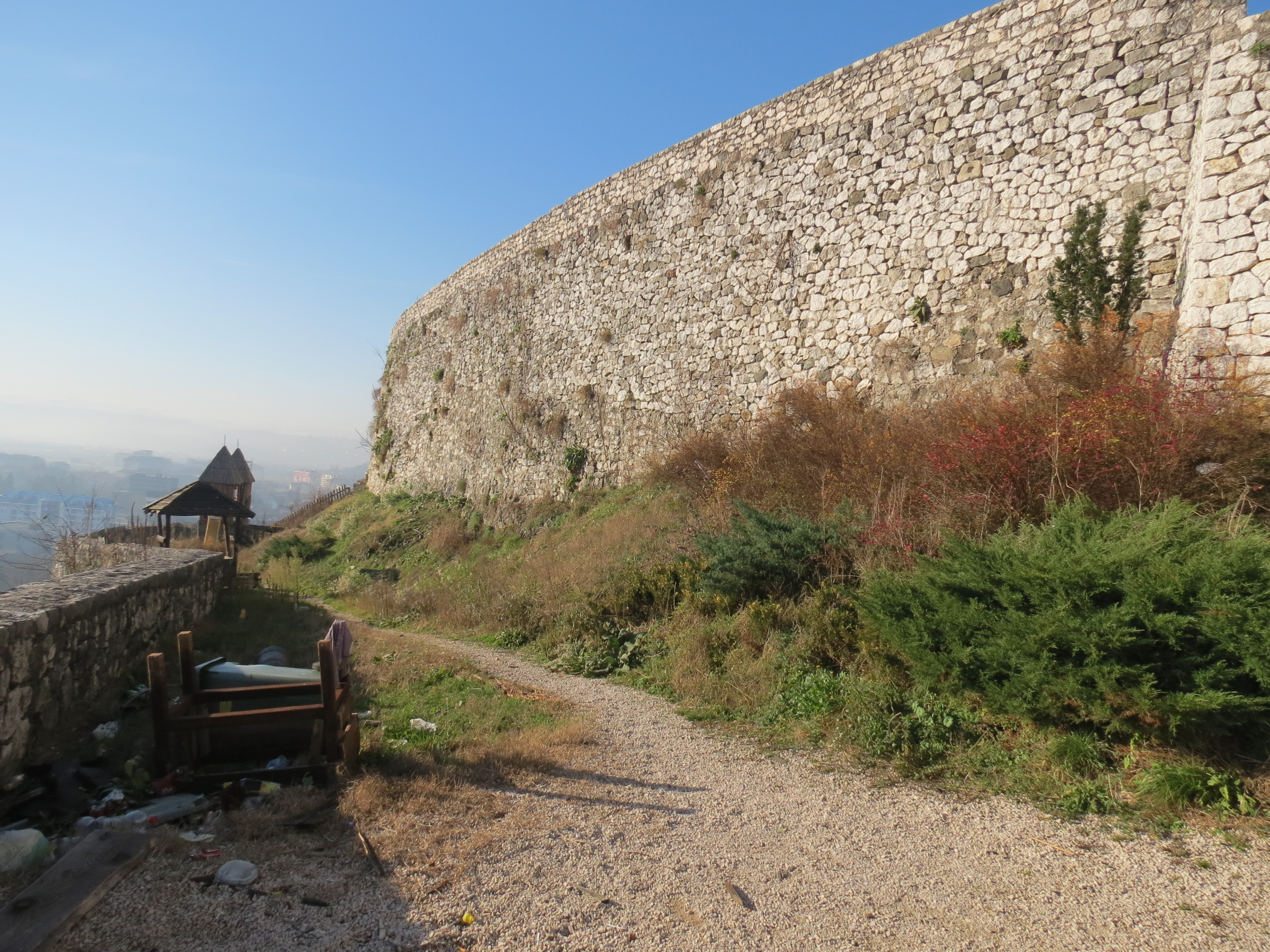
Same view, in 2014.

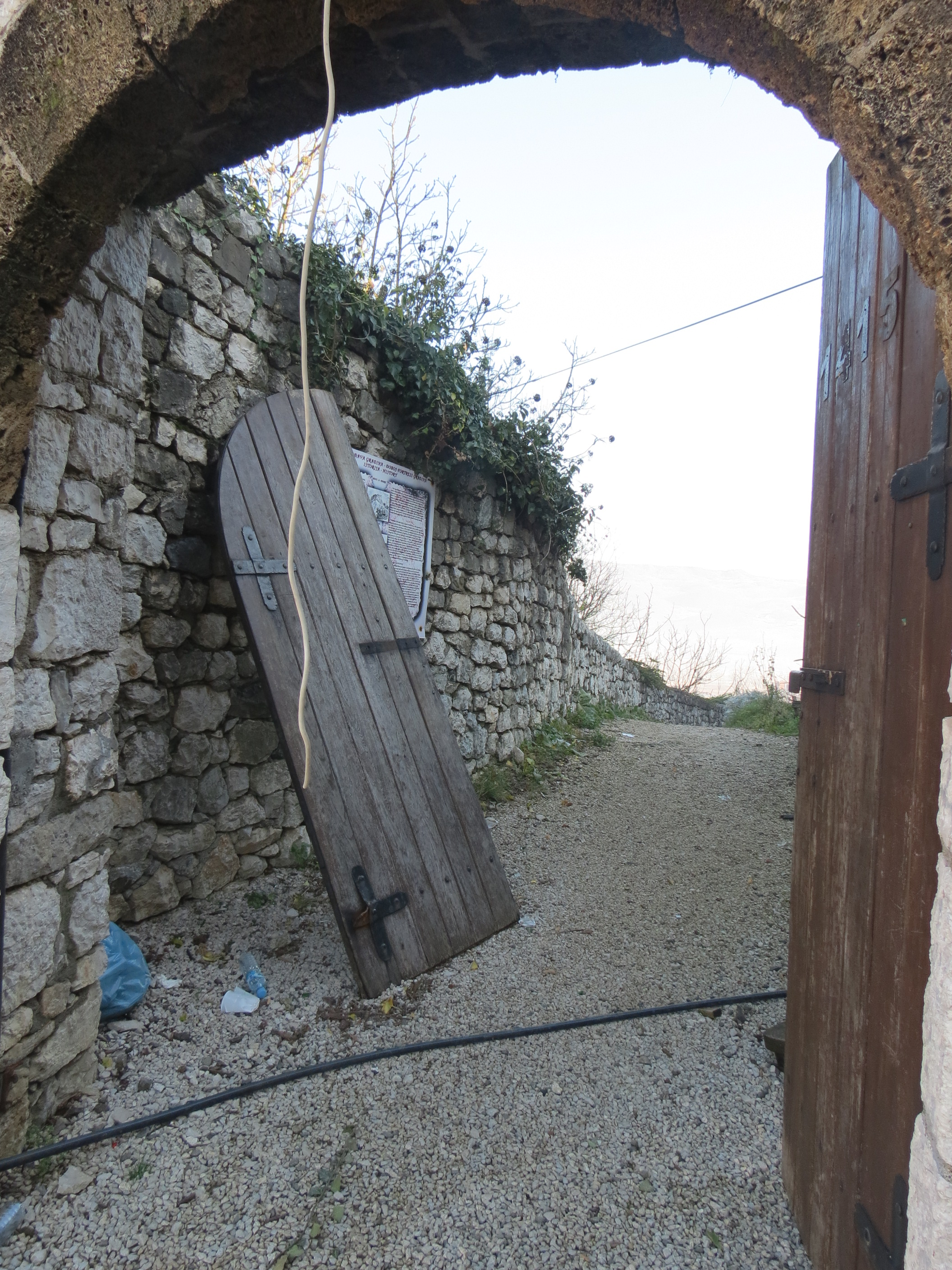
Abandoned entrance.

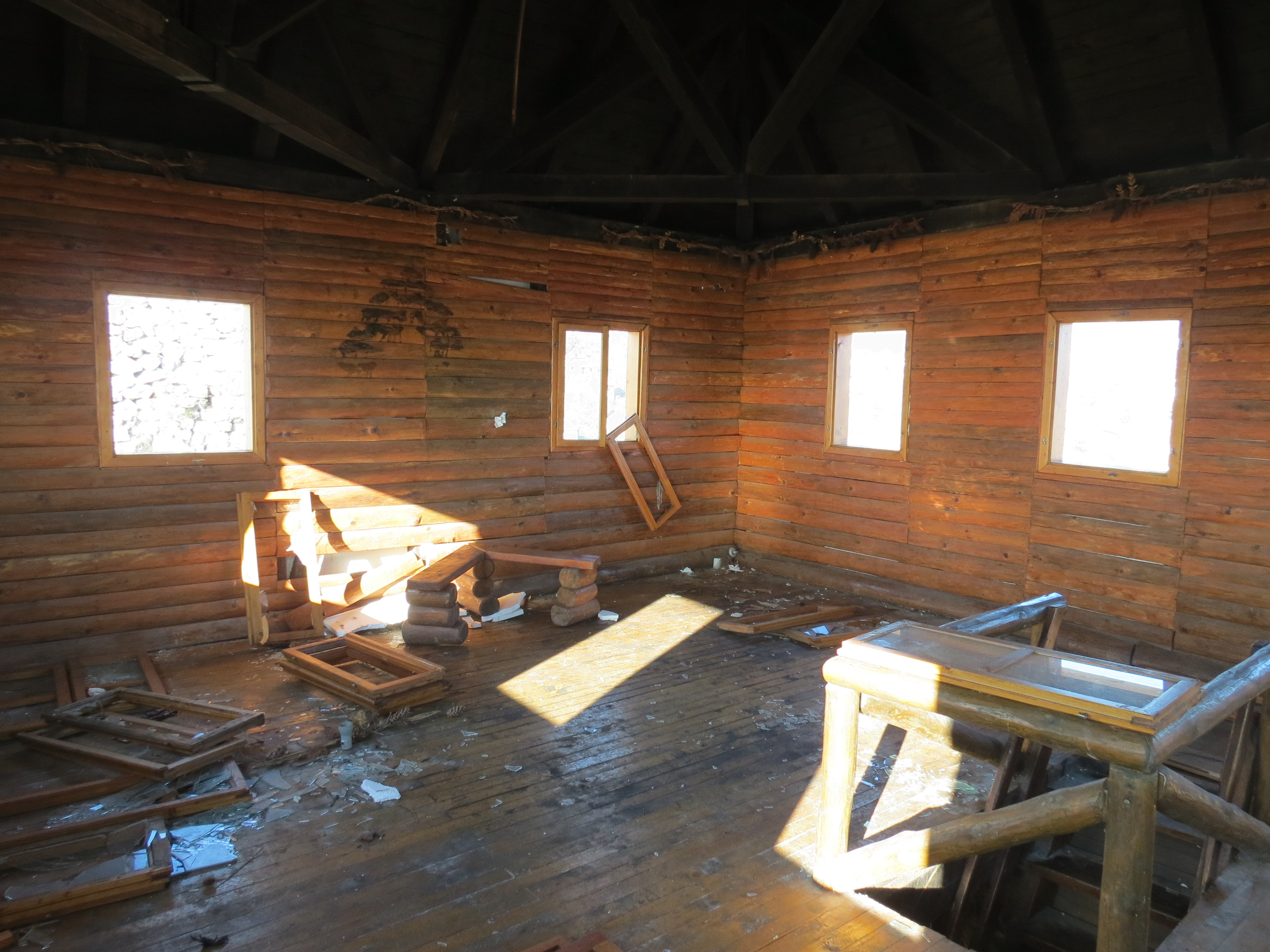
Vandalized interior.

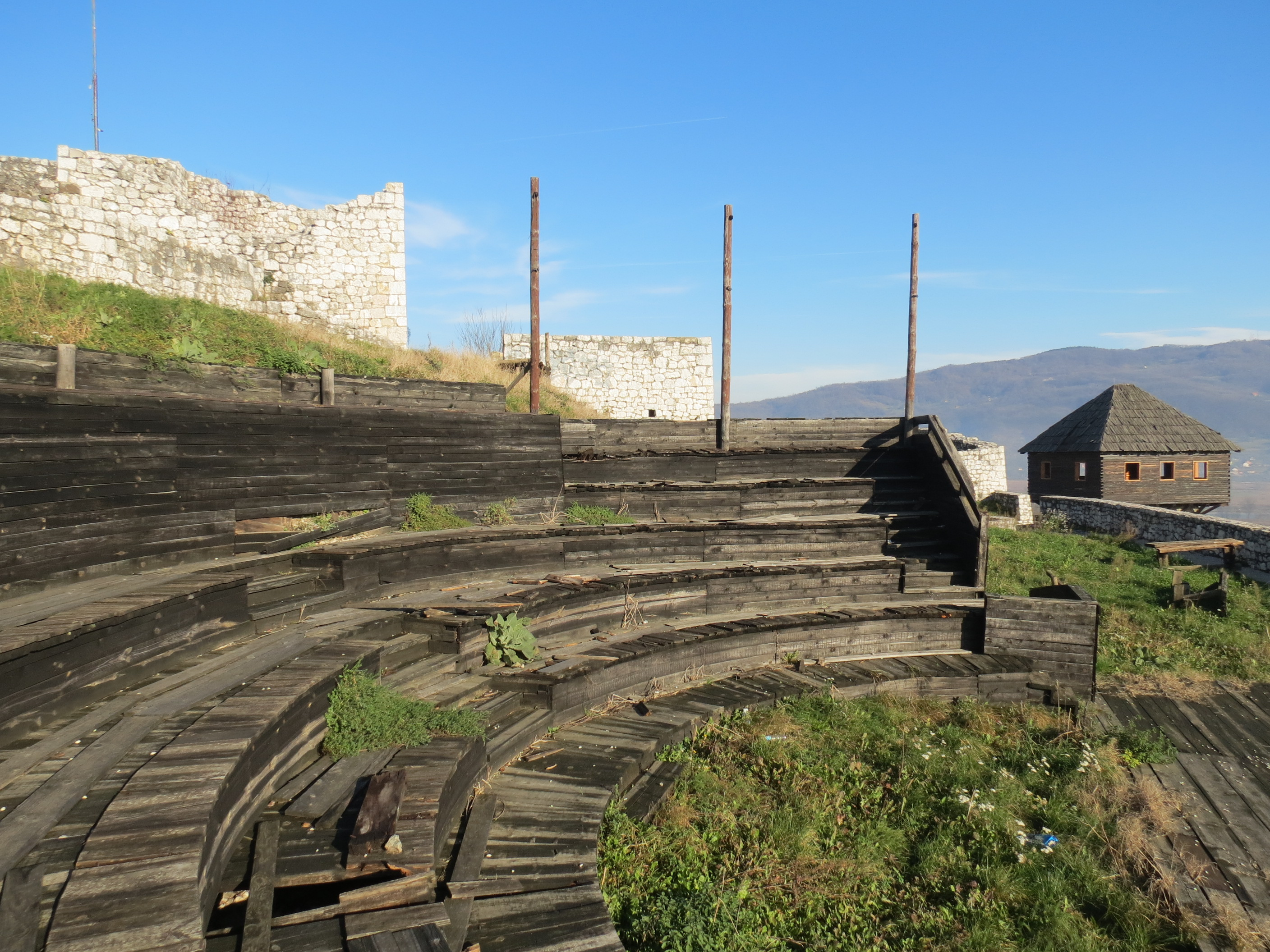
Abandoned amphitheater.

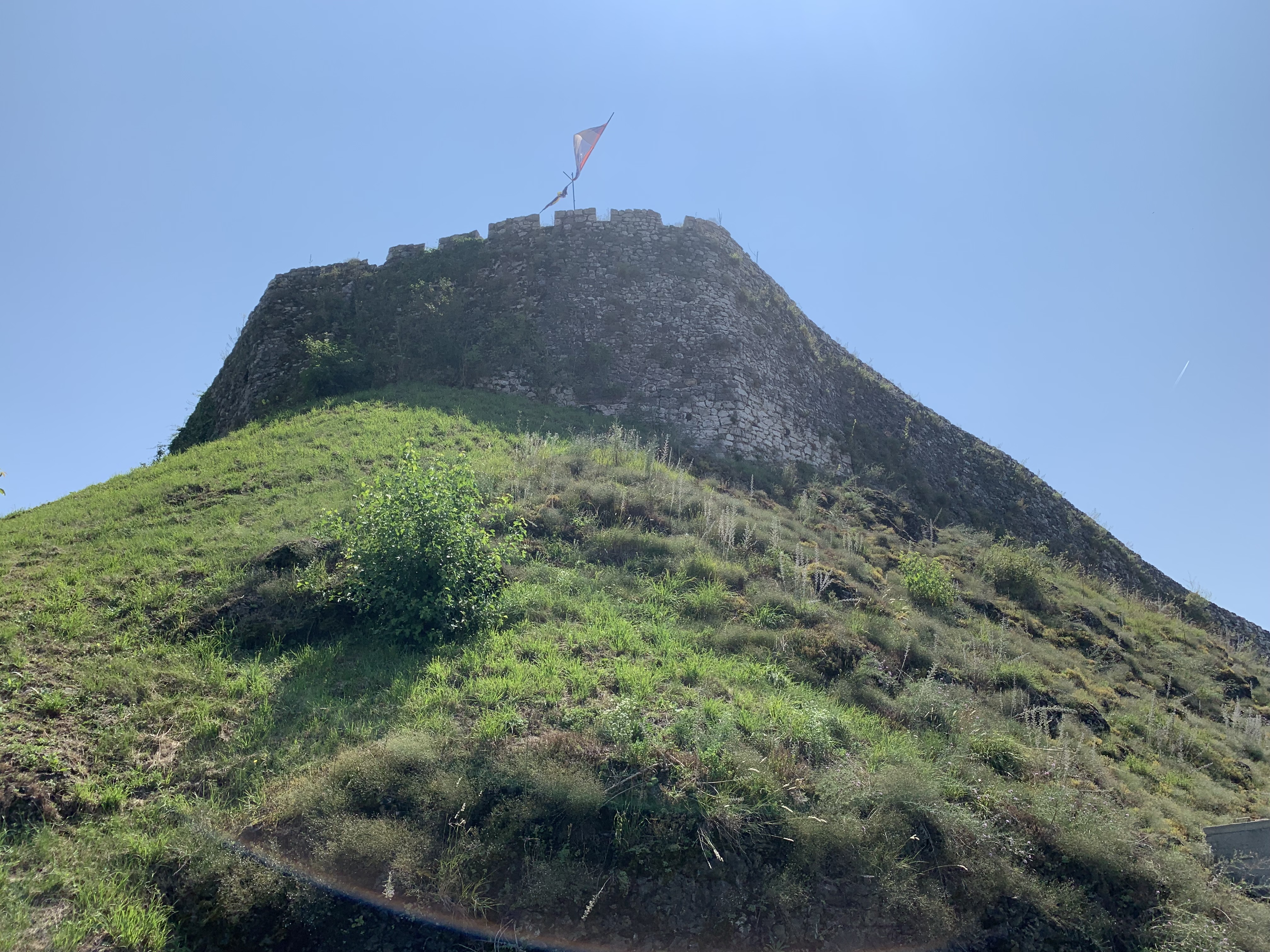
Northern tower with six cannon-supporting bastion.

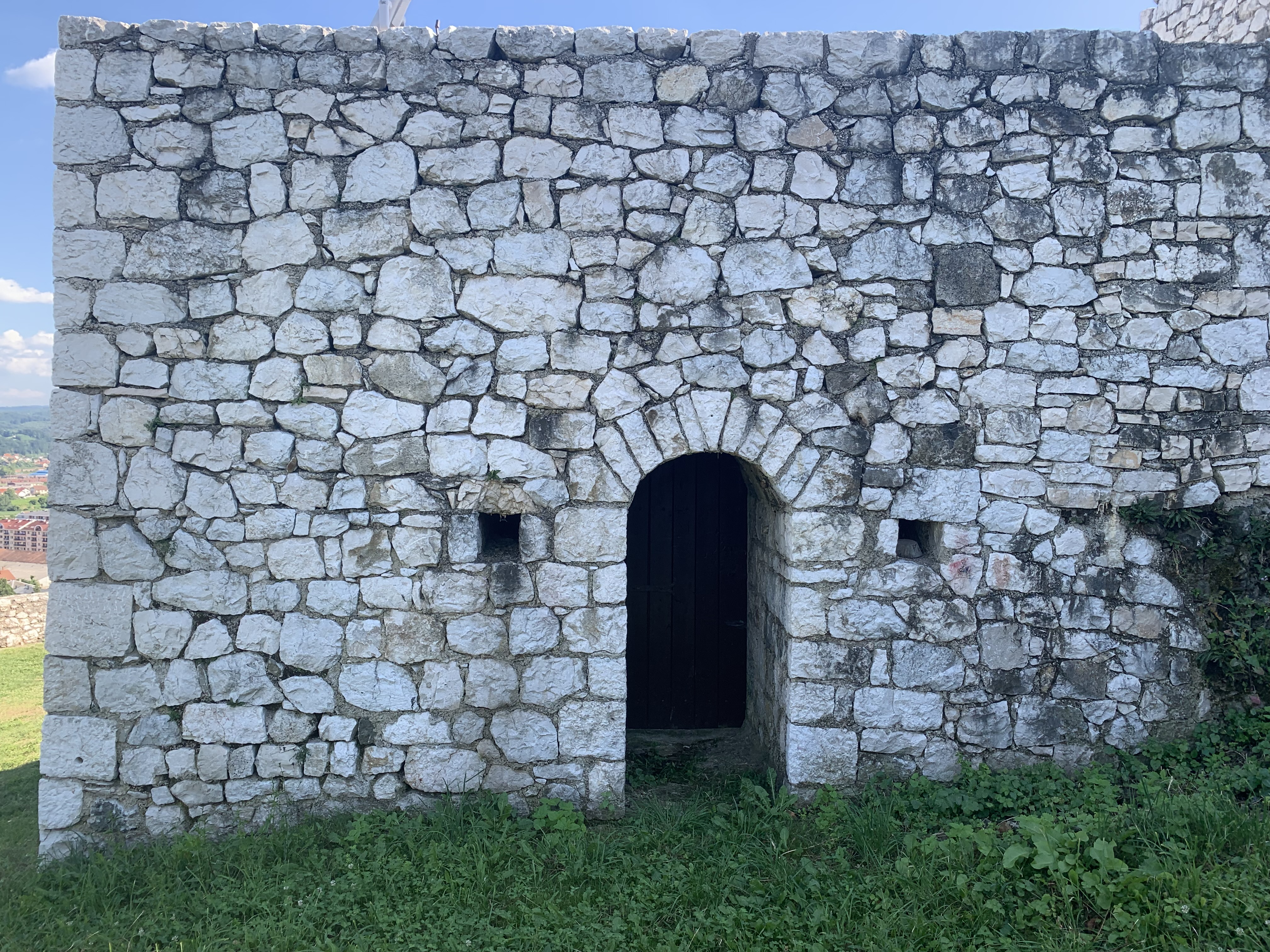
The armory.

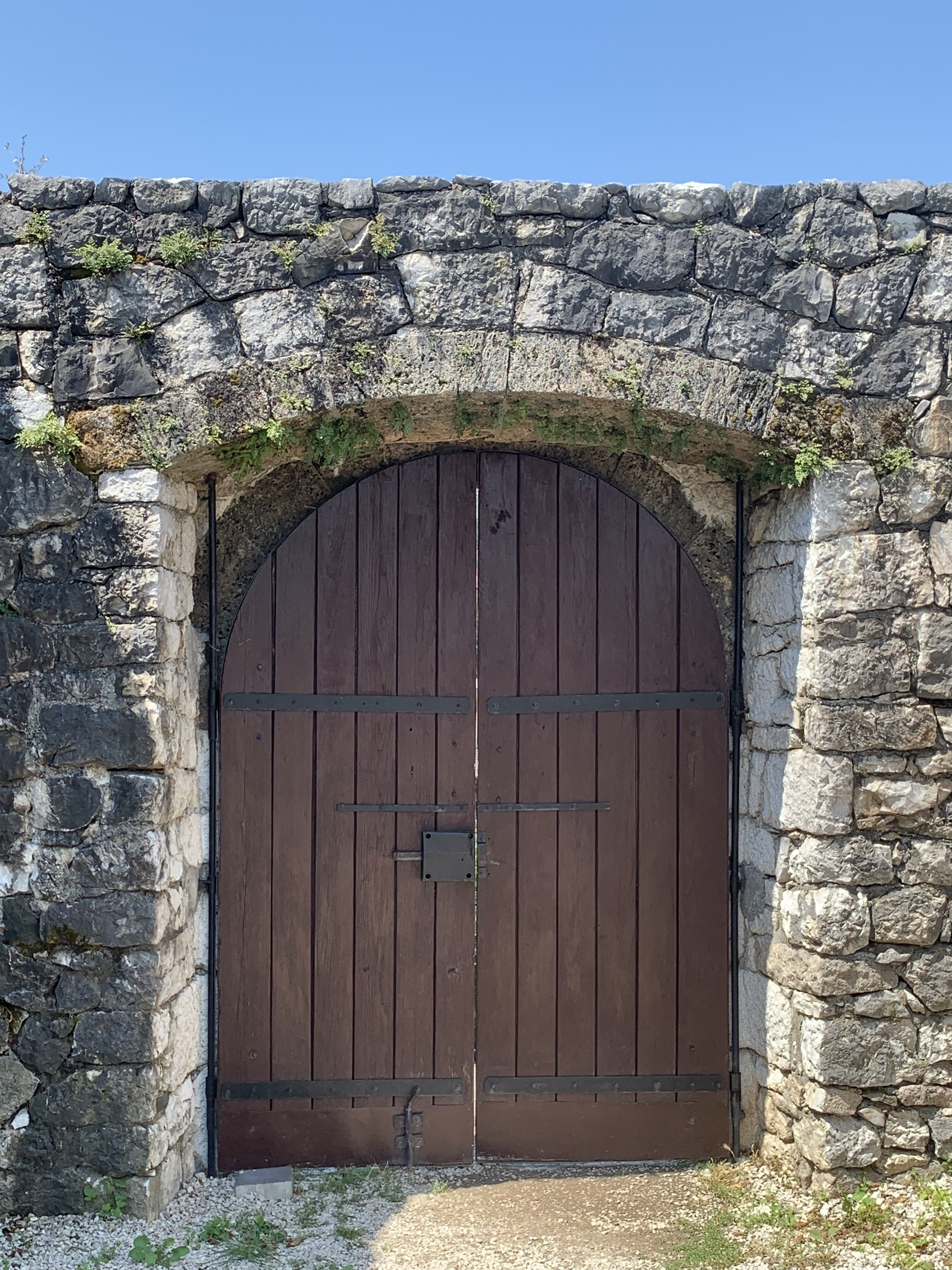
The main gate.
