= Tolisa, Modriča =

Tolisa Толиса
- Village
- Interactive map of Tolisa
- Location within Bosnia and Herzegovina
- Coordinates: 44°52′50″N 18°18′30″E
- Country: Bosnia and Herzegovina
- Entity: Republika Srpska
- Municipality: Modriča
- Time zone: UTC+1 (CET)
  - Summer (DST): UTC+2 (CEST)

Tolisa (Cyrillic: Толиса) is a village in the municipality of Modriča, Republika Srpska Bosnia and Herzegovina.

== See also ==
- Tolisa (river)
