= Tolisa, Orašje =

Tolisa Толиса
- Village
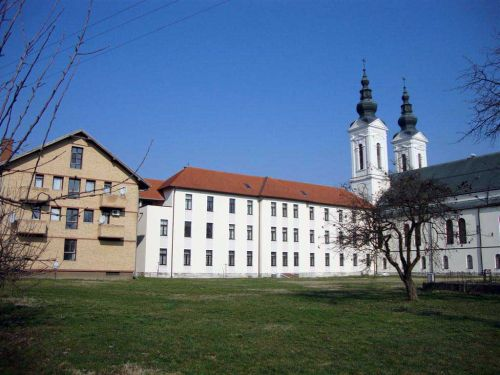
- Franciscan monastery and church, Tolisa
- Interactive map of Tolisa
- Location within Bosnia and Herzegovina
- Coordinates: 45°2′30″N 18°38′43″E
- Country: Bosnia and Herzegovina
- Entity: Federation of Bosnia and Herzegovina
- Canton: Posavina
- Municipality: Orašje

Area
  - Total: 6.98 sq mi (18.09 km^{2})

Population (2013)
  - Total: 2,731
  - Density: 391.0/sq mi (151.0/km^{2})
- Time zone: UTC+1 (CET)
  - Summer (DST): UTC+2 (CEST)
- Website: www.tolisa.info

Tolisa is a place in north-eastern Bosnia and Herzegovina in region Bosanska Posavina. Tolisa has a population of approximately 3,900 people. Its name is derived from the Tolisa River.

== History ==
The earliest records of Tolisa are from the 13th century: "Tera Tolis" (Latin: muded land.)

Tolisa is the home of the first civil elementary school in Bosnia and Herzegovina, founded in 1823 by parish priest friar Ilija Starčević. The largest Catholic church in Bosnia and Herzegovina is located in Tolisa, constructed from 1864 to 1881.

== Demographics ==
According to the 2013 census, its population was 2,731.

Ethnicity in 2013
Ethnicity	Number	Percentage
Croats	2,717	99.5%
Serbs	4	0.1%
Bosniaks	1	0.0%
other/undeclared	9	0.3%
Total	2,731	100%
