= Trebava =

Mountain in Bosnia and Herzegovina

Coordinates: 44°50′N 18°18′E

Highest point
- Elevation: 400 m (1,300 ft)

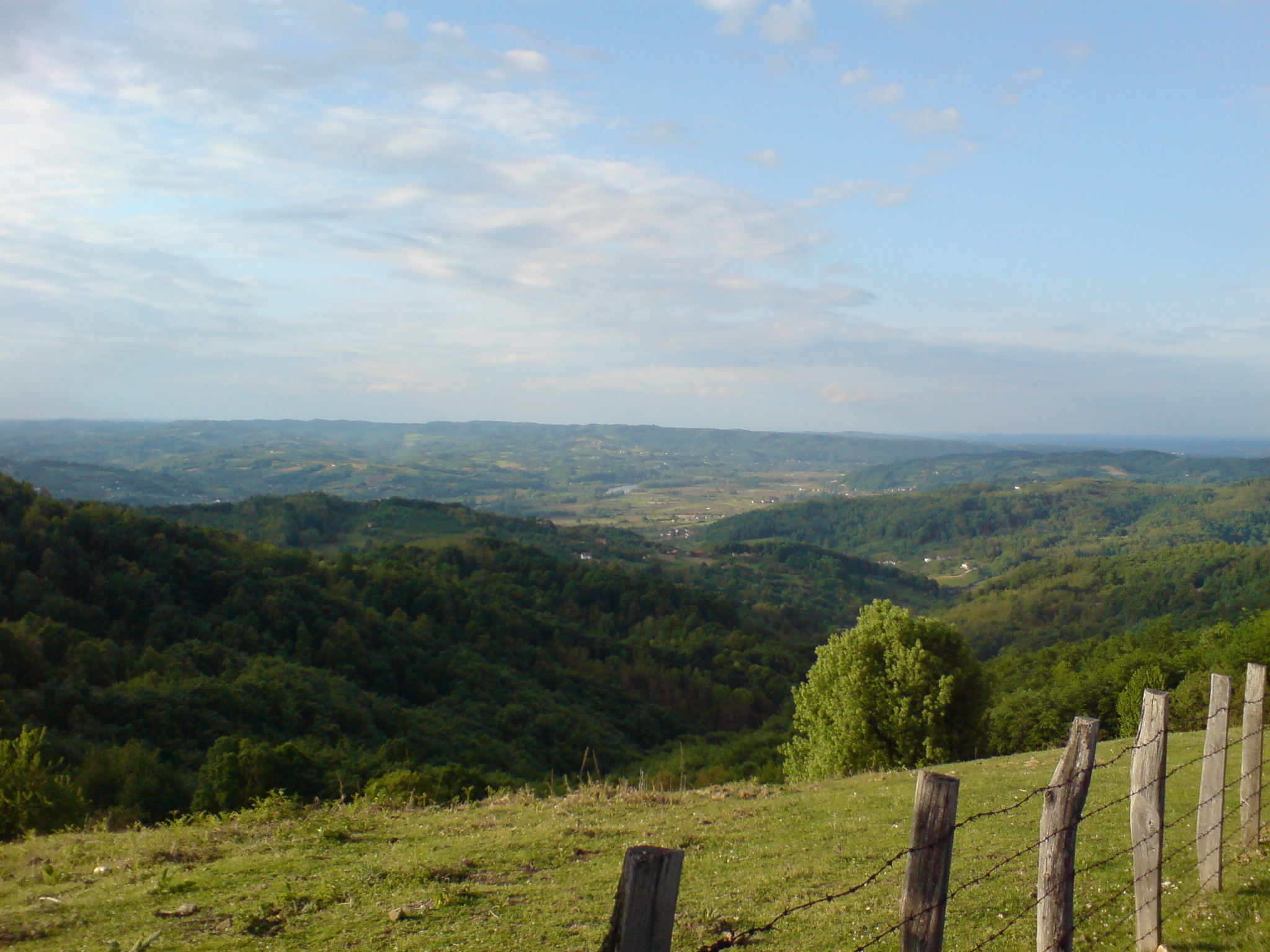
View from Trebava.

Trebava (Serbian Cyrillic: Требава/Требавац) is a mountain located in northeastern Bosnia and Herzegovina.

Trebava sits on the border between the Federation of Bosnia and Herzegovina and Republika Srpska. Trebava is about 110 kilometers north of the Bosnian capital Sarajevo, while Banja Luka, the de facto capital of Republika Srpska, is about 85 kilometers to its west. Its highest peak is Vis (692m), located in Gračanica in the Federation of Bosnia and Herzegovina.

== Etymology ==
The name "Trebava" is of Old Slavic origin and means "polytheistic altar". The word trijebiti—“to separate” or “to clean”—has survived in the Serbo-Croatian language. The mountain was named after the Slavic (polytheistic) sanctuaries where various rituals were performed.

As Trebava is an area historically and currently inhabited by Slavic people, "Trebava", or, "Trebavac" has always been named as such, although "Trebovac" can also serve as an alternative equivalent name for the Croatian language.

== See also ==
- List of mountains in Bosnia and Herzegovina
