= Ottoman–Bosnian conflicts =

The Ottoman–Bosnian conflicts fall in two main eras, the Ottoman conquest of Bosnia and Herzegovina between the 14th and 15th centuries and the Bosnian uprising (1831–1832).

Name	Date	Location	Result
Battle of Bileća	August 27, 1388	Bileća, Eastern Herzegovina	Bosnian victory
Battle of Kosovo	1389	Kosovo field	Inconclusive
Second battle of Srebrenica	1444	Srebrenica, Lower Podrinje	Ottoman-Serbian victory
Third battle of Srebrenica	1445	Srebrenica, Lower Podrinje	Bosnian victory
Fourth battle of Srebrenica	1446	Srebrenica, Lower Podrinje	Bosnian victory
Fifth battle of Srebrenica	1448–1449	Srebrenica, Lower Podrinje	Bosnian-Hungarian victory
Battle of Ključ	1463	Ključ, Bosanska Krajina	Ottoman victory
Siege of Travnik	1831	Travnik, Bosnia Eyalet	Bosniak rebel victory
Battle of Kosovo	1831	Kosovo field	Bosniak rebel victory
Bosnian uprising	1831–1832	Bosnia Eyalet, Kosovo field	Ottoman victory
