= Battle of Kosovo (disambiguation) =

Battle of Kosovo may refer to:

- Battle of Kosovo (1369)
- Battle of Kosovo (1389)
- Battle of Tripolje (1402)
- Battle of Kosovo (1448)
- Battle of Kosovo (1831)
- Battle of Kosovo (1915)
- Kosovo Operation (1944)
- Insurgency in Kosovo (1995–1998)
- Kosovo War (1998–1999)
- Battle of Kosovo (film)
