= Kamberović =

Kamberović is a surname. Notable people with the surname include:

- Faik Kamberović (born 1967), Bosnian footballer
- Husnija Kamberović (born 1963), Bosnian historian
- Radenko Kamberović (born 1983), Serbian footballer
