= Gradačac Castle =

Castle in Gradačac, Bosnia and Herzegovina

- Gradačac, Bosnia and Herzegovina
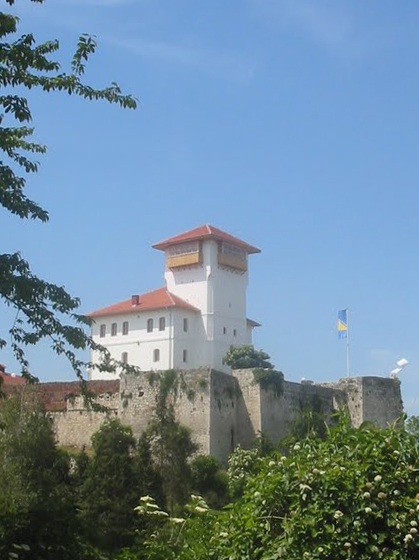
- Gradačac Castle

Location
- Coordinates: 44.8780155°N 18.4255512°E

Garrison information
- Designations

KONS of Bosnia and Herzegovina
- Official name: Old fort of Gradačac with Gradaščevića tower, the historic site
- Type: Category 0 monument
- Criteria: II. Value; A, B, D i.ii., E iii.v., F ii.iii, G v., I iii.
- Designated: 2 November 2004 (?th session No. )
- Reference no.: 2509
- Decision no.: 02-35-83/04
- Listed: List of National Monuments of Bosnia and Herzegovina
- Operator: Town of Gradačac

Gradačac Castle (Bosnian, Croatian and Serbian: Gradačačka tvrđava / Градачачка тврђава) is a castle and fortified complex Gradačac in Bosnia and Herzegovina. It stands on a hill above the town centre on the slopes of the Majevica mountain range, at an elevation of about 138 metres (453 ft) above sea level. Together with the adjacent clock tower and other historic buildings it forms part of the ensemble "Old fort of Gradačac with Gradaščević tower", which is designated a national monument of Bosnia and Herzegovina.

Gradačac Castle consists of a fort whose curtain walls reach around 18 metres (59 ft) height and enclose the upper part of the hill, together with a prominent three story tower (kula) rising to about 22 metres (72 ft). built between 1765 and 1821.The fortifications in their present form date from the late 18th and early 19th centuries, when a series of construction and renovation campaigns transformed an earlier stronghold into the seat of the Gradačac captaincy. The tower is closely associated with the local captain Husein-kapetan Gradaščević, and local tradition remembers it as the headquarters of his military and administrative staff. In 1831 Husein-kapetan Gradaščević, colloquially known as "Zmaj od Bosne" ("Dragon of Bosnia"), led an uprising of Bosnian ayans against the centralising reforms of the Ottoman sultan and demanded autonomy for Bosnia and Herzegovina. The castle, as the seat of his captaincy, was one of the centres from which this movement was organised, and in later historiography and local memory it came to symbolise his short-lived autonomous rule. The fort and tower have been repaired and renovated on several occasions, including works carried out in the early 19th century under Husein-kapetan and more recent conservation, and today the restored complex functions as a cultural and tourist site overlooking the town.

== See also ==
- Gradačac
- List of castles in Bosnia and Herzegovina
- Bosnian Uprising (1831-1832)
