= Medieval battles of Srebrenica (1411–1459) =

Medieval wars of Bosna and Herzegovina

Date	1411, 1444, 1445, 1446, 1449
Location	Srebrenica, Kingdom of Bosnia
Result	See article

Combatants
In 1411: Kingdom of Bosnia	In 1411: Kingdom of Hungary; Serbian Despotate
In 1444: Kingdom of Bosnia	In 1444: Ottoman Empire; Serbian Despotate
In 1445: Kingdom of Bosnia	In 1445: Ottoman Empire; Serbian Despotate
In 1446: Kingdom of Bosnia	In 1446: Ottoman Empire; Serbian Despotate
In 1449: Kingdom of Bosnia	In 1449: Ottoman Empire; Serbian Despotate

Commanders and leaders
In 1411: Tvrtko II Kotromanić; Hrvoje Vukčić Hrvatinić From 1444–1449: Stjepan Tomaš Support in 1445: Ivaniš Pavlović	In 1411: Sigismund of Luxembourg; Stefan Lazarević; János Maróthy From 1444–1449: Mehmed II; Đurađ Branković

The Medieval battles of Srebrenica were a series of battles between the Kingdom of Bosnia, Kingdom of Hungary, The Ottoman Empire and the Serbian Despotate for mineral rich, notably silver, city of Srebrenica in Eastern Bosnia.

== Importance ==
The city of Srebrenica was located between the historical region of Usora and Podrinje, it was famous for its large number of silver mines from which the city got its name, from the Bosnian word for silver–srebro.

== Sequence of events ==
Until 1404 the city of Srebrenica was in the hands of the Grand Duke of Bosnia, Hrvoje Vukčić Hrvatinić. He ruled until 1410 when the city fell to the rule of Sigismund of Luxembourg, during the Hungarian Wars against Bosnia in 1411. Sigismund awarded Serbian noble Stefan Lazarević for his campaigns against Tvrtko II Kotromanić and gave the city to his domain. The city was reconquered by King Stjepan Tomaš in 1444. For the short period of time in May 1445 all of Lower Podrinje fell to Đurađ Branković, but with the help of Bosnian Duke, Ivaniš Pavlović, he withdrew out of Podrinje. In 1448 the Ottomans launched a large counter-offensive into Bosnia penetrating the realm of Stjepan Tomaš. Stjepan Vukčić Kosača had joined the Turks against Tomaš but with Hungarian support they were driven out. In 1449 Stjepan Tomaš reconquered the city from Branković.

== See also ==
- Battle of Bileća
