= Bosnian Battle of Kosovo (1831) =

Rebel victory over the Ottomans

Battle of Kosovo (1831)
- Part of Bosnian uprising (1831–1832)
Date	18 July 1831
Location	Kosovo field
Result	Bosnian victory

Belligerents
Bosnian rebels: Local Albanians	Ottoman Empire

Commanders and leaders
Husein Gradaščević; Ali Pasha Fidahić; Mujaga Zlatarević	(Ottoman Empire) Reşid Mehmed Pasha

Strength
25,000	(Ottoman Empire) 21,000

The Battle of Kosovo in 1831 took place between the Vizier of Bosnia Husein-kapetan Gradaščević and his loyalists together with local Albanians against the Ottoman Empire, whose troops were commanded by the Grand Vizier Reşid Mehmed Pasha.

== Background ==
After the Siege of Travnik the Bosnian Army met in Busovača to march on the Kosovo field on 13 April 1831. The main plan of Gradaščević was to meet the Army of Mustafa Pasha Bushatli whose army numbered 40,000 men. Reşid Mehmed Pasha had attacked Mustafa Pasha in Skopje to stop the Bosniaks and Albanians meeting at Kosovo; allegedly Reşid Pasha had bribed Bushatli's men with promises of giving them gold to turn them onto his side. Mustafa Pasha's army had been defeated by the Grand Vizier causing Bushatli to retreated into Shkodra where his army fell under siege in the city.

== Battle ==
Gradaščević had marched his army through Novi Pazar reaching today's Kosovo and Northern Albania. The first rebellion against him came from a fortress that used to be an Orthodox monastery commanded by Albanian troops where he reached and besieged Peć. In the fortress was Reşid Pasha. Gradaščević had called him to surrender but the Grand Vizier refused, pointing to his cannons on the walls of the fortress. Gradaščević had mounted his horse and called upon his men to attack the fortress. Soon, the Bosniaks had taken the fortress, climbing the walls and defeating the Ottoman Army. The Grand Vizier fled to Priština. Mujaga Zlatarević and some 300 men headed to scout and search for the Sultan's nizams. After three days, Zlatarević reached Lipljan where the Ottoman Army had dug trenches.

The army was predominantly made up from Albanians and nizams. Zlatarević had returned to Gradaščević to inform him. The following day, after morning prayer, Gradaščević's men marched onto the city to besiege it. The battle between the Bosniaks and Ottomans happened on 18 July 1831 near the place of Lipljan (some believe it was Kačanik) Kosovo. Many of the Albanians had fled and joined the Bosnian Army. The battle was a humiliating defeat for the Ottoman Army and Reşid Pasha fled the scene of the battle, leaving his cannons and other military equipment. His own archive and luggage were found by the Bosnian soldiers, and he fled to the city of Skopje. Gradaščević's general Ali-paša Fidahić had taken the unorganized Ottoman Army's disadvantage to take the city of Peć. The Bosniaks had taken a hostage, a servant of mutesellim of Thessaloniki (Solun) named Ahmed Pasha. Historians argue, but the majority agree that Reşid Pasha had recognised the demands of the Bosniaks and that he had accepted that Bosnia should have its own Vizier, just not the young Husein-kapetan. The Bosniaks had left the field victorious believing that the Ottomans had recognised Husein-kapetan as the Vizier even though no Ottoman ferman (royal mandate) of the Sultan had yet been written or given out to Gradaščević and his rebels, which would lead to further war between the Bosniaks and the Ottoman Empire.
