= Bosniak National Awakening =

The Bosniak National Awakening (Bosnian: Bošnjačko narodno prosvjetiteljstvo), also known as the Bosniak Revival (Bošnjački preporod) or Bosniak Renaissance (Bošnjačka renesansa), is a period in history of the Bosniak people in which the Bosniaks and their intellectual front gathered together to stop the assimilation of their culture, language, people and country during the rise of Serb and Croat irredentism while being under Ottoman, Austro-Hungarian and Yugoslav rule. The National Awakening traces its roots to the 17th century but had been commonly adapted in the 19th and 20th century.

== Origins ==
=== Bosnian uprisings (1831–1850) ===
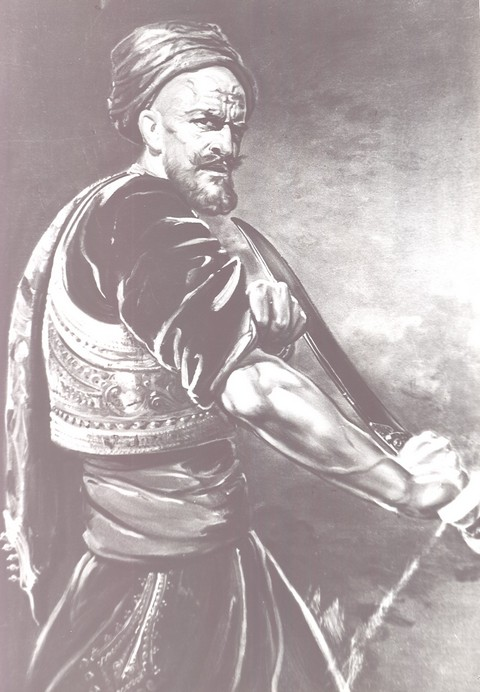
Painting of Husein-beg Gradaščević by Kristian Kreković.

The Muslim Bosniaks had felt a sense of betrayal from the Turkish Muslims, furthermore the abolishment of the ayan system which had been practiced by most of the Muslim elite, this upon territorial losses to Serbia, Austria and Montenegro in the last two centuries, foreign governors the Bosniaks started to develop a sentiment against the reformist Sultan Mahmud II which would lead to the First Bosnian Uprising in 1831 led by Husein-kapetan Gradaščević, who demanded Bosnian Autonomy, return of the 6 nahiye and Bosniak governors within the Eyalet, due to his patriotism, charisma and military victories he would receive the name Zmaj od Bosne (English:Dragon of Bosnia). Gradaščević's uprising had resulted in a defeat mainly due to loyalist in Herzegovina such as Ali-paša Rizvanbegović and Smail-aga Čengić, but the Bosniaks would lead another uprising in 1850 which started after Omer Pasha Latas had read the new ferman, the Bosniaks would rebel in Krajina, Posavina and Central Bosnia all of whom were brutally defeated, Omer Pasha Latas would take on several murders of the Bosniak Muslim Elite, the ones who were not murdered were arrested and sent to Constantinople. This would lead to a catastrophy in Bosnian society, and due to this Bosniaks would fall under assimilation of the Serbs and Croats as the Bosniak Muslim nobility were the only ones mainly educated on their ethnic origins, linguistics and their national identity. Even Ali-paša Rizvanbegović, a Bosniak who was on the side of the Ottoman Sultan against Gradaščević had been one of the ones murdered by Latas.

== In literature ==
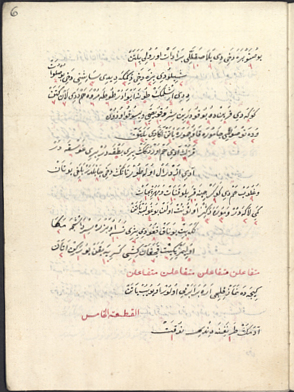
Bosnian dictionary by Muhamed Hevaji Uskufi Bosnevi in 1631.

Bosnian Book of the Science of Conduct written by Abdulvehab Ilhamija, published posthumously in 1831. It was written in Bosnian Arebica script.

The Bosnian language has had a very developed poetry during this period, it also has one of the oldest dictionaries out of all the South Slavic people published in 1631 by Muhamed Hevaji Uskufi Bosnevi. Bosniaks such as the Sufi mystic Abdulvehab Ilhamija from Žepče, who had been a very educated man and published several literary works in Bosnian, Persian, Arabic and Turkish criticised the rule of the new Bosnian beylerbey Dželaludin-paša (Turkish:Celaludin Pasha) as a cruel ruler of Bosnia and the people and for his corruption. For this public criticism Dželaludin-paša invited Ilhamija to come to his home from Žepče to Travnik. Ilhamija walked by foot, where what happened to Ilhamija is uncertain. Dželaludin-paša had requested that he renounce his criticism of whim which he denied, in Bosniak legend he was either strangled or decapitated in the Travnik Castle. Furthermore, Bosniak Catholics such as Ivan Franjo Jukić who wrote the first Bosnian magazine Bosanski Prijatelj published in 1850, covering the topics of Bosnian Medieval History, Bosnian Medieval rulers and statehood and Ottoman rule in the country, origins of the Bosniak people, the Bosnian language and demographic landscape of the Bosnia Eyalet The Bosniak Catholic Antun Knežević, author of books such as Kratka povjest kralja bosanskih published in 1886 on the history of Bosnian kings. Knežević had written about Bosniak history since the medieval times, stating that Bosniaks were not Serbs or Croats but a separate people of three religions, with their own customs, history and language and was largely against the Serbisation of Orthodox Bosniaks and Croatisation of Catholic Bosniaks. These two Franciscans although Catholic were openly criticising the attempts of the Croatisation of the Bosniak Catholic population in Bosnia in the 19th century.

Another prominent Bosniak writer of this era is Hafiz Salih Gašević from Nikšić known for his poetic work Jasni i uzvišeni Mevlud na bosanskom jeziku (English:Clear and glorified Mawlid in the Bosnian language). In the preface of his Mawlid Gašević wrote the following:

I am begged by the elders of Kolašin:

"Write a Bosnian Mawlid for us!

For the Quran is all the Iman we have

Build us a Bosniak Mawlid, we please!"

Bosnian:

Moliše me kolašinski prviši:

"Nami mevlud daj bosanski napiši!

Što j' u Kur'an na sve iman imamo

Bošnjački nam gradi mevlud molimo!"

Another prominent figure of Bosniak literature was a woman named Umihana Čuvidina, in 1813, Čuvidina was engaged to a young man named Mujo Čamdži-bajraktar who died as a soldier of the imperial army of Ali-paša Derendelija during the First Serbian Uprising of the early 19th century. He was killed near the small town of Loznica near the Drina river. Strongly affected by her fiancé's death, Čuvidina decided never to marry and began writing poetry about her fiancé and his fellow soldiers. For three years after Mujo's death, Umihana did not make it out of her yard. In the fourth year, she manually cut off all her hair as a sign of eternal mourning for her dead love and tied it onto the fence in her yard. This is something that is mentioned in her poems. The only full poem that can be attributed to Čuvidina without doubt is the 79-verse-long epos called "Sarajlije iđu na vojsku protiv Srbije" (English: "The Men of Sarajevo March to War Against Serbia"), which was written in Arebica script.Ivan Franjo Jukić and other Bosnian Franciscans requested the right to establish a printing house in 1847, 1850, 1853, and 1857, but each time their requests were denied by the Ottoman government. After the Vilayet reforms Bosnia got its first printing house named Vilajetska štamparija. It was bought by the Government of the Vilayet of Bosnia from Ignjat Sopron, a Serbian writer from Zemun. Its most notable editor was Mehmed Šakir Kurtćehajić from Bijelo Polje, Bosnia's first newspaper founded in 1866 and he would later on establish Sarajevski cvjetnik in 1868.

== Austro-Hungarian rule ==
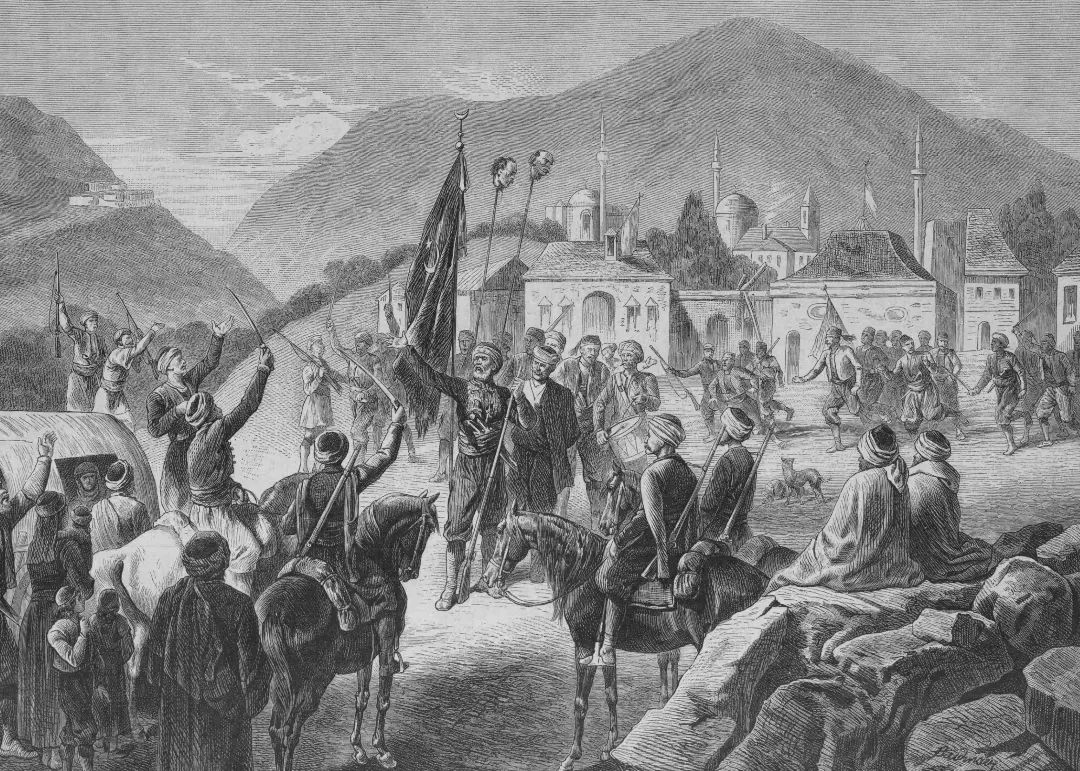
Salih Vilajetović (Hadži Lojo) preaches insurrection before the gates of Sarajevo, 1878.

Austria-Hungary occupied Bosnia in 1878 where the local population led a fierce resistance led by Hadži Lojo, which had been defeated by the much stronger and well-armed Austro-Hungarian Army, furthermore by the Congress of Berlin Bosnia would lose the Sanjak of Novi Pazar and much of the Eastern territories of the Sanjak of Herzegovina, including Nikšić and Kolašin. The Catholic population was very fond of the new Monarchy, The Orthodox and Muslim population saw them as invaders. The Bosniak Muslims who remembered the Habsburg invasion in the 17th century feared that they and their children would become Christianised largely fled to the Ottoman Empire, estimates range between 140,000 and 200,000 Bosniak Muslims settled in the Ottoman Empire during the Austro-Hungarian rule. After years the Muslims had realised they can live freely in the new monarchy, Franz Joseph would grant the Muslims a Grand Mufti separate from the Ottoman Empire, first one being Mustafa Hilmi Hadžiomerović.

== The Bosniak renaissance ==
=== Bosniak literature in the 19th-20th century ===
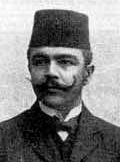
Safvet-beg Bašagić, father of the Bosniak renaissance.

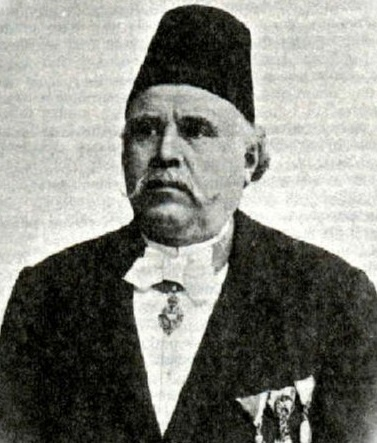
Mehmed-beg Kapetanović Ljubušak, author of the first Bosniak newspapers "Bosniak".

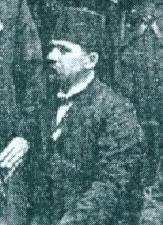
Edhem Mulabdić, author of Zeleno Busenje.

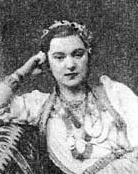
Umihana Čuvidina, the most well known Bosniak female poetress of the 19th century.

Western literature and literary styles were introduced, the newspaper "Bosniak" was started in 1891 by Mehmed-beg Kapetanović Ljubušak, talking about religious, political, linguistic and ethnic topics. Kapetanović had advocated to stop the irredentism and attempted assimilation of the Bosniaks and Bosnian language from Serb and Croat political fronts. Interestingly during this time Bosniak nobles were allowed to keep their estates, many of the nobles actually studied in western secular Universities in Vienna, Budapest and Zagreb, notably Safvet-beg Bašagić who received his doctorate in the University of Vienna and worked as a professor of oriental languages in the University of Zagreb. Bašagić would be the author of many historical books, mainly ranging from the late medieval era to the Ottoman rule in the country. Edhem Mulabdić from Maglaj was also the author of the first novel in the Bosnian Language "Zeleno busenje" (Green sod) published in 1898, Mulabdić was also one of the editors of the newspaper "Bosniak" after Kapetanović's death, he also started the Bosniak political magazine Behar (English:Blossom) in 1900 and cultural society Gajret in 1903 with Safvet-beg Bašagić, Osman Nuri Hadžić and Osman Đilkić (Đikić only started Gajret, he would become isolated from other Bosniak writers due to his pro-Serb views).

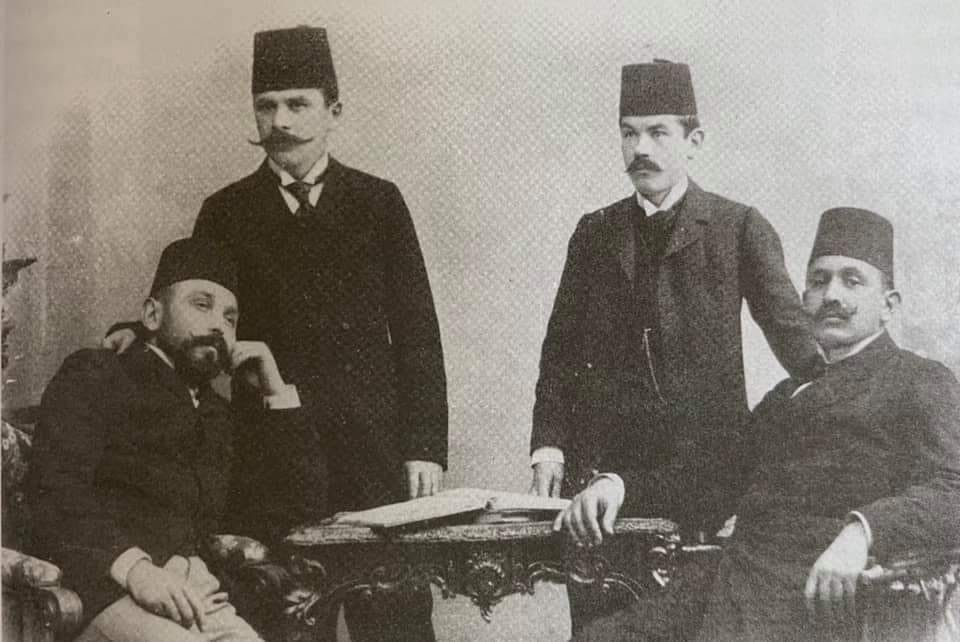
From left to right are seated: Osman Nuri Hadžić and Adem-aga Mešić. Standing are: Edhem Mulabdić and Fehim Spaho. Founders of Behar, 1900.

=== Father of the Bosnian renaissance ===
Safvet-beg Bašagić had been given the title of "Father of the Bosnian renaissance" due to his literary works, Bašagić started writing as a student and published a song Pjesma Bošnjaku (English:Song to the Bosniak) in 1891 in the newspaper Bosniak, he wrote the following:

Song to the Bosniak, 1891:

Greetings, dear memories,

From the mountaineer on the cold rocks,

Where the falcon's nest lies,

Where the land binds blood brothers,

Where better days are anticipated,

Where one's own heroes are revered.

You soar into the clouds,

To extinguish the Sun's fiery rays

And carry them to a tender nest.

Ah, Bosniak! May fortune be with you!

Stand firm, dear Bosnia, as a boundary marker,

Dear Bosnia, a pride and glory!

My Bosniak, eagle-eyed,

We've slept through enough sweet dreams,

We've overcome enough bitter wounds,

Through a few more years.

The time is near, as it must come, To soar like a gray falcon,

To shout: "The Bosniak still lives!" He still lives, he will not die,

As long as the Earth revolves around the Sun.

You know, Bosniak, it not long ago,

by all of my World, It's not even been fifteen summers,

When in our proud Bosnia,

In the heroic land of Herzegovina,

From Trebinje to the gates of Brod,

There were no Serbs or Croats.

And today, through their whims,

Both strangers spread like their own.

And something else, which the keen eye,

Brave pride and heroic heart,

Must be astonished to see:

Both guests have attacked us,

To seize our brightest treasure,

Our proud and beloved name;

Yes, they want to sweeten their talks!

The moment of decision has come,

To join in the joyous cry:

Hello, son of our dear homeland, Our hero, proud Bosniak!

Greetings to you from the rugged knight,

Live, live for thousands of years!

To the dear mother, for joy and pride,

Fighting for the holy mysteries!"

Bosnian:

"Primi pozdrav, premili spomene

Od gorštaka sa studene st´jene,

Gdje´no soko sokoliće leže,

Gdje´no zemlja krvnu braću steže,

Gdje se bolji očekuju dani,

Gdje se štuju svoji velikani.

Ti poleće nebu pod oblake,

Da ugasiš žarkom Suncu trake

I sneseš ih u gnijezdo milo.

Ha, Bošnjače! Sretno tebi bilo!

Miloj Bosni stani na međniku, Miloj Bosni na ponos i diku!

Moj Bošnjače, oko sokolovo,

Dosta slatkih prespavasmo snova,

Dosta ljutih preboljesmo rana,

Kroz nekol´ko godinica dana.

Već je hora, koja doći mora,

Da poletiš kao soko sivi,

Da povikneš: “Jošte Bošnjak živi!“

Jošte živi, mrijet mu se neće,

Dok se Zemlja oko Sunca kreće.

Znaš, Bošnjače, nije davno bilo,

Sveg’ mi sv'jeta nema petnaest ljeta,

Kad u našoj Bosni ponositoj,

I junačkoj zemlji Hercegovoj,

Od Trebinja do Brodskijeh vrata,

Nije bilo Srba ni Hrvata.

A danas se kroz svoje hire,

Oba stranca ko u svome šire.

I još nešto, čemu oko vješto,

Hrabri ponos i srce junačko,

Nada sve se začuditi mora:

Oba su nas gosta saletila,

Da nam otmu najsvjetlije blago,

Naše ime ponosno i drago;

Eto hoće, šećer razgovore!

Kucnuo je časak odlučnosti,

Da kliknemo i mi u radosti:

Zdravo sine, mile domovine,

Naš junače, ponosni Bošnjače!

Pozdravlja te sa krša viteze,

Živi, živi na hiljade ljeta!

Miloj majci na radost i diku,

Boreći se za otajstva sveta!“

Bašagić wrote several other songs, such as Šta je Bošnjak? (English:What is a Bosniak?):

What is a Bosniak? A small branch

of the grand Slavic tree,

whose name is written

on the forefront of the epic tales.

What is a Bosniak? A renowned name

known to the world for a long time,

that shook Vienna and Buda,

and Constantinople and flat Kosovo.

What is a Bosniak? A knightly tribe

whose wings the fairy spread,

from Durmitor to the Carpathian mountains,

from the Balkans to the azure sea.

What is a Bosniak? A small nation

that stood between two worlds,

that faced European powers

and shattered crusader armies.

What is a Bosniak? The godchild of Davor,

offspring of glorious but bloody fate,

he will die ten times, not just once,

but he will never renounce his Bosniakhood!

Bosnian:

Šta je Bošnjak? Jedna mala grana

velikoga stabla Slavijana,

koga ime u pročelju piše

Povijesnicu junačkih mejdana.

Šta je Bošnjak? Jedno ime slavno

koje svijet poznaje odavno,

koje Beč i Budim potresaše

i Carigrad i Kosovo ravno.

Šta je Bošnjak? To pleme viteško

Koga vila prostiraše krila,

s Durmitorom do Karpatskih gora,

sa Balkana do sinjega mora.

Šta je Bošnjak? Jedan narod mali

koji međ’ dva svijeta stajaše,

koji sile evropskije silah

i križarske vojne razbijaše.

Šta je Bošnjak? Kumče Davorova,

čedo slavne, al’ krvave sreće,

deset puta, ne jednom, umrijeće,

al' bošnjaštva odreći se neće!

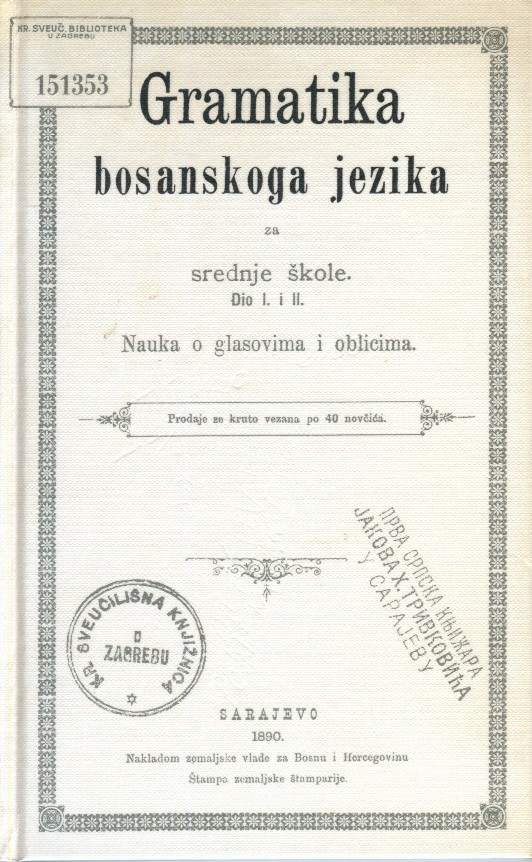
Bosnian grammar book from 1890.

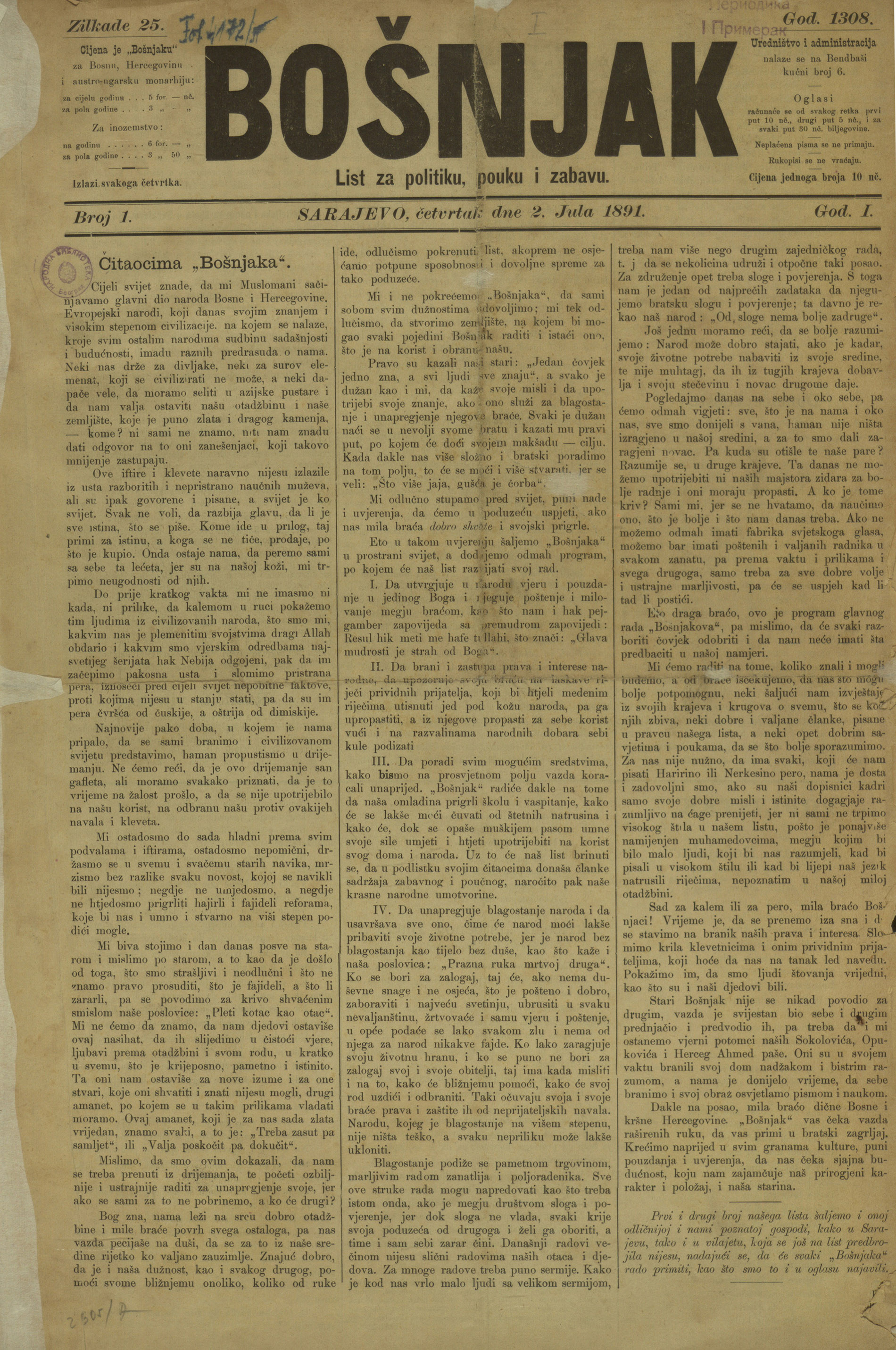
The newspaper "Bosniak", 1891.

Outside of songs Bašagić would be the author of several books on Bosniak historiography, his works Kratka uputa u prošlost Bosne i Hercegovine (1463-1850) (English: Short guide to the past of Bosnia and Herzegovina (1463-1850)) published in 1900, Gazi Husrev-beg published in 1907, Bošnjaci i Hercegovci u islamskoj književnosti (English:Bosniaks and Herzegovinians in Islamic Literature), published in 1912 and Znameniti Hrvati, Bošnjaci i Hercegovci u Turskoj carevini (illustrious Croats, Bosniaks and Herzegovinians in the Ottoman Empire) published in 1931 were one of the greatest written historical books on Bosniak in the first half of the 20th century, predominantly oriented on Ottoman rule in Bosnia. He was also an author of several religious texts such as Opis orijentalnih rukopisa moje biblioteke (English: Description of oriental handwritings of my library), Nizamul-Alem published in 1919 Mevlud (Mawlid) in 1924 and many others.

== Kingdom of Yugoslavia and WWII ==
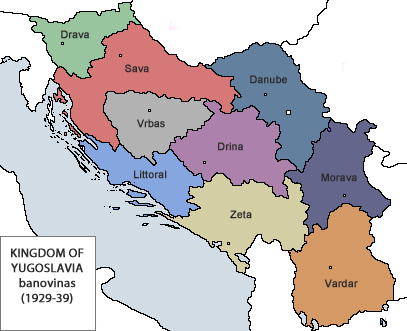
Banovina's of Yugoslavia in 1929.

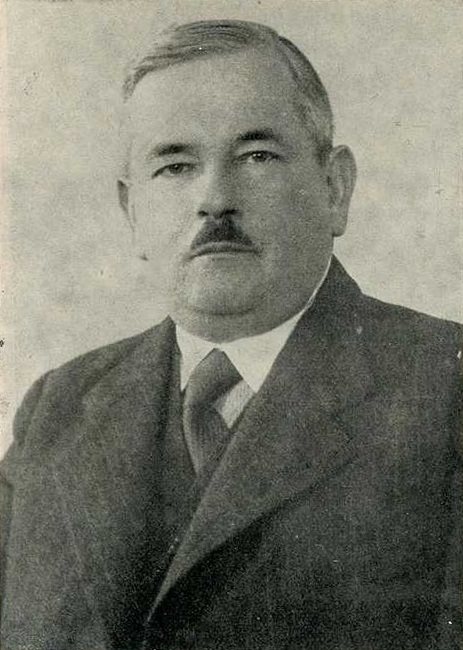
Mehmed Spaho

After World War I Bosnia and Herzegovina, alongside Croatia and Slovenia were annexed into the new Kingdom of Serbs, Croats and Slovenes (Renamed Kingdom of Yugoslavia in 1929). During this period the Bosnian language was banned and so was the Bosniak ethnic identity. Even since the late Austro-Hungarian rule the Bosnian language was swapped with the "Serbo-Croatian language" and Bosniaks were treated as "Serbo-Croat Muslims". The local Bosniak intellectuals gathered together to form a Bosniak political party called the Yugoslav Muslim Organisation, named by this due to the banning of the Bosniak ethnicity led by Mehmed Spaho, Bosniaks were also involved in the Džemijet Party. Furthermore, Bosnia would be split into 4 newly established Banovinas, Zeta, Vrbas, Primorka and Drina. The problem arose during 1939 after the establishment of the Banovina Croatia and Cvetković–Maček Agreement, where Bosniaks would be split between a Greater Croatian Banovina and Greater Serbian Banovina's. Mehmed Spaho who strongly opposed this agreement was most likely poisoned during his visit to Belgrade in 1939. The splitting of Bosnia between the two parties was halted in 1939 after The German Invasion of Yugoslavia. After his death, the president of YMO became Džafer-beg Kulenović, a pro-Croat.

== World War II ==
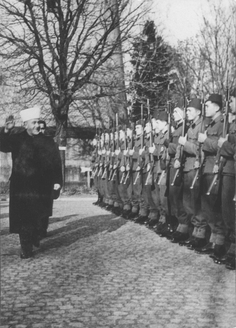
Haj Amin al-Husseini reviewing a parade of soldiers from the 13th SS Handschar Division.

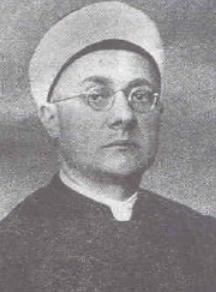
Mehmed Handžić, Islamic theologian one of the writers of the Resolution of Sarajevo Muslims.

During World War II Bosnia was annexed as a part of the Independent State of Croatia, a Nazi Puppet State where the Bosniaks were seen as Croat Muslims. Although their ethnicity was not allowed Muslims enjoyed religious freedom, but from 1941 to 1945 the Muslims especially around Sandžak, Podrinje and Herzegovina were openly attacked, massacred, burned alive and raped by Chetnik Militia in rural Bosniak villages. Due to the failure of the Ustaša regime many Bosniaks joined the Yugoslav Partisan Movement, such as Sulejman Filipović. The Ustashe, attempting to secure their Eastern Border from Partisans and Chetniks formed Hadžiefendić Legion and the Hadnschar Division and the Germans formed the Sandžak Muslim Militia in Sandžak. Although open to Chetnik attacks for years the local Bosniak intellectual elite gathered together to form a resolution of a total of 108 Bosniak intellectuals in Prijedor (September 23, 1941), Sarajevo (October 12, 1941), Mostar (October 21, 1941), Banja Luka (November 12, 1941), Bijeljina (December 2, 1941), Tuzla (December 11, 1941) and Zenica (May 26, 1942). The basis for the Resolution of Sarajevo Muslims was a resolution declared by El-Hidaje, an association of ulama from Bosnia and Herzegovina on its assembly held on August 14, 1941. It was written by Mehmed Handžić and Kasim Dobrača. All Muslim resolutions of 1941, including the Resolution of Sarajevo Muslims, contain the following elements:

- public condemning of the persecutions of the Serbs by Ustaše
- distancing from the Muslims who participated in such persecutions and protesting against the attempts to blame the whole Muslim population for the crimes of Ustaša
- presenting information about the persecutions of Muslims
- demanding assistance for victims of all religions

The resolution was officially delivered to Jozo Dumandžić when he visited Sarajevo as minister in the government of Independent State of Croatia. By the order of Ante Pavelić, Dumandžić unsuccessfully attempted to force the signatories of the resolution to recall their signatures. Džafer Kulenović has also been ordered by Pavelić to force the signatories of the resolution to recall their signatures, but he failed too.

Outside of the Muslim militia's, Partisans and Chetniks a new Islamist movement appeared amongst the Bosniaks named Mladi muslimani ("Young Muslims"). Given that the Young Muslims were founded just before the collapse of the Kingdom of Yugoslavia and that shortly after Bosnia and Herzegovina became part of the newly established Independent State of Croatia, an Axis puppet state led by the Croatian fascist Ustaše, Young Muslims tried to offer pan-Islamism as a response to an identity crisis of Bosnian Muslims. Due to shared opposition to reforms, Young Muslims have closely linked to the El-Hidaje association. In order to avoid being abolished or merged into an Ustaše organization, Young Muslims transformed into the youth branch of El-Hidaje. With time, Young Muslims expanded their network and managed to cover most of the towns in Bosnia and Herzegovina. Young Muslims engaged in two types of activities. On the one hand, within El-Hidaje they organized religious activities, including meetings, congregational prayers, and celebrations of Muhammad's birthday. On the other hand, they participated in the charitable organization Merhamet (English: "Charity") and took care of Muslim refugees from eastern Bosnia and Herzegovina. One of their members was also Alija Izetbegović, the future president of the Republic of Bosnia and Herzegovina and Mustafa Busuladžić, an Islamic theologian who viewed Islam as a natural enemy of Communism and Fascism.

== Communist Yugoslavia ==
Communist Yugoslavia was established in 1945 as a secular one-party nation in the Balkans for all the South Slavs, including Bosniaks. Although it was modeled as a free nation, Yugoslavia took the footsteps of the old monarchy and the Bosnian language and Bosniak ethnicity was yet again not allowed. Husein Husaga Ćisić a prominent Bosniak politician and one of the members of ZAVNOBiH and AVNOJ he fought to introduce a sixth torch to the Yugoslav Coat of Arms and to allow Bosniaks to be one of the six equal ethnic groups, stating: "Even today, when we are constantly suggested that our narrower homeland is equal to the other federal units, and we Bosniaks with the other peoples of Yugoslavia, it is still not allowed for us to call ourselves by our real name. Our people are not allowed to be called either Bosniaks or Yugoslavs, and yet, when, by necessity, one says they are Muslim, it seems to pass perhaps because it is a collective term for 300 million people scattered across 5 continents.", he has also stated: "To us Bosnians, as the indisputable descendants of those old Bosniaks, they have granted the right to call ourselves Muslims with a transparent tendency, so that under that sign, in all given circumstances, they deny us the right to speak on national and state-legal matters in general, and especially in national and state-legal matters concerning our narrower homeland, Bosnia and Herzegovina." In 1964 the Yugoslav government introduced a religious identity in an ethnic sense named "Muslims" with a capital M by the struggle of Džemal Bijedić and Hamdija Pozderac. In the linguistic sense Bosnian schools taught Serbo-Croatian in education, much of Serbian and Croatian linguistic features were forced onto Muslims in Bosnia and Herzegovina and Sandžak, including the removal of the letter "h", stopping the usage of shortened words and softening. In search of medieval culture, of which only a little more than legend remains, Mehmedalija Mak Dizdar restored its ancient Bosnian figures to their original questioning within the historical span of literary expression. Seeing himself as its legitimate successor, he demonstrates how this culture, with its language and civilizational context, did not lose continuity with the arrival of the Ottomans, when Bosnian kings and nobles descended from the historical stage.

== Bosniak identity in the 1990s ==
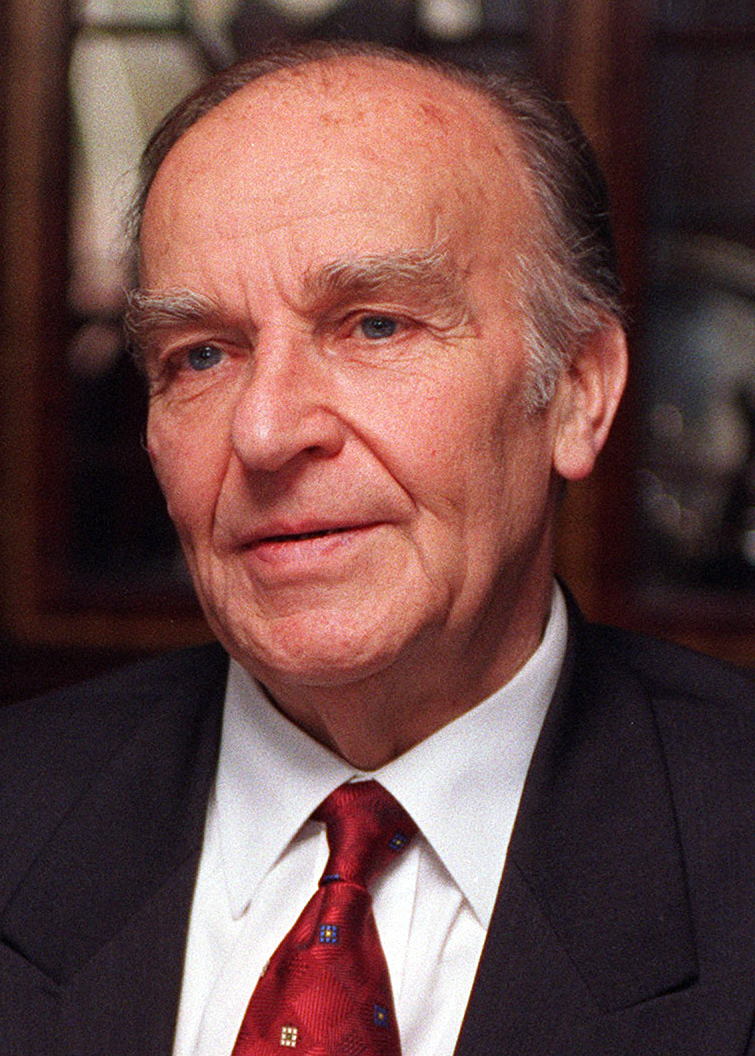
Alija Izetbegović, first president of the independent Republic of Bosnia and Herzegovina.

The struggle to carry on and re-establish the Bosniak ethnic was still ongoing. Alija Izetbegović who was already arrested for his religious works was released in and reincroduced to Bosnian politics in the 80's and 90's. The introduction of a multi-party system in Yugoslavia at the end of the 1980s prompted Izetbegović and other Bosniak activists to establish a political party, the Party of Democratic Action (Stranka Demokratske Akcije, SDA) in 1990 and the Muslim Bosniak Organisation (Muslimanska Bošnjačka Organizacija, MBO), founded by Muhamed Filipović. It had a largely Muslim character; similarly, the other principal ethnic groups in Bosnia and Herzegovina, the Serbs and Croats, also established ethnically based parties (SDS and HDZ BiH). The SDA won the largest share of the vote, 33% of the seats, with the next runners-up being nationalist ethnic parties representing Serbs and Croats. With a 63% turnout and 99.4% voting in favour, The Republic of Bosnia and Herzegovina ceded from Yugoslavia on 1 March 1992 as a state of Muslims, Serbs and Croats. The peace was short as the country was pulled into a war on 6 April 1992, that would last until December 1995. The war was marked by widespread atrocities, particularly against Bosniak civilians, including rapes, massacres, ethnic cleansing, and culminating in genocide. A key figure in the return of the Bosniak identity was Adil Zulfikarpašić from Foča who had emigrated to Italy and later on Switzerland in 1963, together with a group of Serbian, Croatian, Slovenian, and Bosniak democratic intellectuals and politicians, he established a movement called the Democratic Alternative, which presents a program for the reform of Yugoslavia as a decentralized and democratically organized community, with complete equality of all nations. In 1964, with democratically oriented Bosniaks around "Bosanski pogledi," he initiated the establishment of the Liberal Alliance of Bosniaks. At the congress in Munich, chaired by Zulfikarpašić, about eighty representatives from twenty countries participated. Zulfikapašić also founded the Bosniak institute in 1988, it was officially opened in 2001 in Old Town Sarajevo. He was also the author of the book "The Bosniak". His organisation mainly sought to establish cooperation with people inside the country, without entering the structures of emigrant politics.

=== Bosniak Assembly ===
The first Bosniak Assembly was a gathering held at the Holiday Inn in Sarajevo on September 27 and 28, 1993. It was organized by the Council of Congress of Bosniak Intellectuals. Historically significant for the Bosniaks, it marked the change of the nation's name from Musliman to Bosniak, and the restoration of the name of the Bosnian language as the national language of the Bosniaks. The new name was accepted and recognized by the Dayton Peace Agreement on December 14, 1995. Following the first assembly, the Second Bosniak Assembly was held on July 18, 1994. A total of 377 delegates and 80 representatives from Tuzla, Doboj, Zenica, Visoko, Travnik, Mostar, Konjic, Bihać, Banja Luka, Zagreb and Goražde attended the assembly. The session was presided over by Prof. Dr. Enes Duraković, who, in his opening statement, introduced the president of the initiative committee Alija Isaković, the president of the Presidency of Bosnia and Herzegovina Alija Izetbegović, the reis-ul-ulema Mustafa ef. Cerić, academician Prof. Dr. Muhamed Filipović, and the Minister of Foreign Affairs of Bosnia and Herzegovina Dr. Haris Silajdžić. The assembly was also attended by the Turkish, Iranian, and American ambassadors, the U.S. envoy, representatives of Islamic, Catholic (Vinko Puljić), and Orthodox religious institutions, etc.

== Sources ==
- Bougarel, Xavier (1997). "From Young Muslims to Party of Democratic Action: the Emergence of a Pan-Islamist Trend in Bosnia-Herzegovina". Islamic Studies. 36 (2/3: Islam in the Balkans). Islamabad: Islamic Research Institute, International Islamic University: 533–549. ISSN 2710-5326. JSTOR 23076211. S2CID 146579411.
- International Crisis Group (26 February 2013). "Bosnia's Dangerous Tango: Islam and Nationalism" (PDF). Archived from the original (PDF) on 6 February 2015.
