= Garevac =

Garevac Гаревац (Serbian)
- Village (Selo)
- Location within Bosnia and Herzegovina
- Coordinates: 44°58′07″N 18°21′14″E
- Country: Bosnia and Herzegovina
- Republic: Republika Srpska
- Municipality: Modriča

Population (1991)
  - Total: 2,795
- Time zone: UTC+1 (CET)
  - Summer (DST): UTC+2 (CEST)

Garevac (Cyrillic: Гаревац) is a village in the municipality of Modriča, Republika Srpska, Bosnia and Herzegovina.
