= Front Slobode =

Newspaper

1944 masthead

Front Slobode was a newspaper that was launched in the middle of the World War II, on 7 November 1943 in Yugoslavia. It was of a regional character, published and distributed in North Eastern part of Bosnia and Herzegovina, and grew into a local Tuzla newspaper. It was a newspaper where Dervis Susic published a first story, and artist Ismet Mujezinovic created the masthead. The newspaper was changed from city ownership to private and finally, stopped operating as a newspaper in 2007.

== Later use of the name ==
On 11 December 2013, the newspaper was reincarnated as a web portal. Whilst unconnected to the newspaper, new, digital incarnation of the name is also decidedly anti-fascist in its outlook, and promotes tolerance, transparency and democracy.
