= Siege of Travnik =

1831 military siege in Bosnia

Date	26 March 1831 – 7 April 1831
Location	Travnik, Bosnia Eyalet
Result	Bosnian victory: Travnik captured by rebels
Territorial changes	Most of Bosnia and Sandžak captured by the Bosniak Rebels

Belligerents
Bosnian autonomists	Ottoman loyalists

Commanders and leaders
Husein-kapetan Gradaščević; Memiš-beg Bajramović	(Ottoman Empire) Morali Namik Pasha (POW) (Ottoman Empire) Mustafa-paša Sulejmanpašić (Ottoman Empire) Osman-beg Sulejmanpašić

Strength
4,000	At least 2,000

The siege of Travnik was a siege in the seat of the Bosnia Eyalet that took place in 1831, commanded by the Bosniak military general Husein-kapetan Gradaščević, seeking to gain the autonomy of Bosnia, to return the Bosnian nahiye given to the Principality of Serbia by the Sultan and to abolish the ayan reforms.

== The Battle ==
Gradaščević with his loyalists set out from Tuzla to march to Travnik, reaching the city on the 26 March 1831 with 4,000 men, which had been the seat of the Bosnia Eyalet and its governor. Gradaščević had called Namik Pasha to surrender the city and to join his cause calling him to recnognise the Autonomy of Bosnia, Namik Pasha stayed in the city walls calling upon two of his loyalists Mustafa-paša Sulejmanpašić and his brother Osman-beg Sulejmanpašić. Gradaščević had fired cannons onto the city, calling its people and viziers to join his army, Memiš-beg Bajramović, one of Husein-kapetan's generals defeated the Sulejmanpašić brothers, who had commanded an army of 2,000 men, the city soon fell to the hands of the autonomists on the 7 April after a great battle, Morali Namik Pasha was captured and had agreed upon the deals of the Bosniaks and recognised the autonomy of Bosnia, Namik Pasha had burned the new nizam uniforms and was ordered to wear the traditional uniforms of the viziers. Upon the request of the autonomists, Namik Pasha had sent a sanction to the Sultan in Constantinople, requesting that Mahmud II recognise Bosnian autonomy. Although Namik Pasha did allegedly recognise the rule, he fled the city on the 21st of May to reach Stolac, whose capitan was Ali-paša Rizvanbegović, a Bosniak noble loyal to the Ottoman Sultan.
