= Husnija Kamberović =

Bosnian historian (born 1963)

- Born: 6 September 1963 (age 63); Mionica, Gradačac, Bosnia and Herzegovina

Academic background
- Education: University of Sarajevo
- Thesis: (2001)

Academic work
- Discipline: Modern history
- Institutions: University of Sarajevo

Husnija Kamberović (born September 6, 1963) is a Bosnian historian and a professor of modern history at the Faculty of Philosophy, University of Sarajevo, in Sarajevo, Bosnia and Herzegovina.

== Education ==
He completed primary and secondary education in Gradačac. After graduating from high school, he graduated in history at the Department of History at the Faculty of Philosophy, University of Sarajevo, in Sarajevo in 1987, and received his master's degree from the Faculty of Philosophy in Zagreb in 1991, where he also successfully defended doctoral thesis ten years later, in 2001.

== Career ==
He worked at the Institute of History in Banja Luka from 1988 to 1989, and after that at the Institute of History in Sarajevo, of which he was a director from 2002 to 2016. He was also elected assistant professor since 2005, associate professor since 2010, and received full professorship since 2016, at the Department of History at the Faculty of Philosophy in Sarajevo, where he teaches the history of Southeast Europe from 1918 to 1995, and the history of Bosnia and Herzegovina from 1918 to 1995.

From 2006 to 2009 he was the project-leader of the Bosnian research team with the international scientific project, the "New and Ambiguous Nation-building Processes in South-eastern Europe: Collective Identities in Bosnia-Herzegovina, Macedonia, Moldova and Montenegro in Comparison (1944–2005)", which was realized at the Institute for Eastern European Studies, at the Department of History, FU Berlin, Germany.

During 2013, he was the project-leader of the Bosnia and Herzegovina research team with the project entitled “Repräsentationen des sozialistischen Jugoslawien im Umbruch“, at the Humboldt-Universität, Berlin, Germany.

During May 2012, he was a visiting professor at L'École des Hautes Études en Sciences Sociales, in Paris. He collaborated in various scientific journals in Bosnia and Herzegovina and abroad, as well as numerous daily, weekly and monthly newspapers in Bosnia and Herzegovina. He has published 9 books and close to 100 scientific papers on the history of Bosnia and Herzegovina in the 19th and 20th centuries.

He has participated in a number of scientific conferences and collaborated in various scientific journals in Bosnia and Herzegovina and abroad, as well as in numerous daily, weekly and monthly newspapers in Bosnia and Herzegovina. So far, he has published 9 books and close to 100 scientific papers on the history of Bosnia and Herzegovina in the 19th and 20th centuries.

== Bibliography ==
So far, he has published 9 books and close to 100 scientific papers on the history of Bosnia and Herzegovina in the 19th and 20th centuries.

1. Prema modernom društvu. Bosna i Hercegovina od 1945. do 1953. godine Tešanj 2000.
2. Husein-kapetan Gradaščević (1802 - 1834): Biografija Gradačac 2002.
3. Begovski zemljišni posjedi u Bosni i Hercegovini od 1878. do 1918. godine Zagreb-Sarajevo 2003.
4. Begovski zemljišni posjedi u Bosni i Hercegovini od 1878. do 1918. godine (drugo izdanje) Sarajevo 2005.
5. Mehmed Spaho (1883-1939) Politička biografija, Vijeće kongresa bošnjačkih intelektualaca, Sarajevo, 2009.
6. Hod po trnju. Iz bosanskohercegovačke historije 20. stoljeća. Sarajevo: Institutu za istoriju, 2011.
7. Historiografija u Bosni i Hercegovini u službi politike, Zagreb: Srednja Europa, 2012.
8. Džemal Bijedić. Politička biografija, Mostar: Muzej Hercegovine, 2012.
9. Džemal Bijedić. Politička biografija (drugo, dopunjeno izdanje). Sarajevo: Udruženje za modernu historiju (2017)
