= International reactions to the persecution of Uyghurs in China =

International reactions to the alleged persecution of Uyghurs in China have been varied.

== Reactions by supranational organizations ==
=== United Nations ===
On 21 May 2018, during the resumed session of the Committee on Non-Governmental Organizations in the United Nations, Kelley Currie, the United States representative to the United Nations for economic and social affairs, raised the issue of mass detention of Uyghurs in re-education camps, and she said that "reports of mass incarcerations in the Xinjiang were documented by looking at Chinese procurement requests on Chinese websites requesting Chinese companies to tender offers to build political re-education camps".

On 10 August 2018, United Nations human rights experts expressed alarm over many credible reports that China had detained a million or more ethnic Uyghurs in Xinjiang. Gay McDougall, a member of the United Nations Committee on the Elimination of Racial Discrimination, said that "In the name of combating religious extremism, China had turned Xinjiang into something resembling a massive internment camp, shrouded in secrecy, a sort of no-rights zone".

On 10 September 2018, UN human rights chief Michelle Bachelet called on China to ease restrictions on her and her office's team, urging China to allow observers into Xinjiang and expressing concern about the situation there. She said, "The UN rights group had shown that Uyghurs and other Muslims are being detained in camps across Xinjiang and I expect discussions with Chinese officials to begin soon".

In June 2019, UN counter-terrorism chief Vladimir Voronkov visited Xinjiang and found nothing incriminating at the camps.

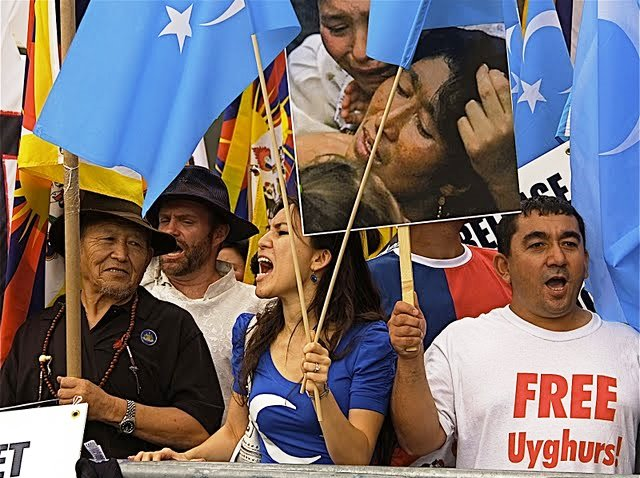
Protesters at the United Nations with the flag of East Turkestan

On 1 November 2019, ten UN Special Rapporteurs together with vice-chair of the UN Working Group on Arbitrary Detention and chair-rapporteur of the UN Working Group on Enforced or Involuntary Disappearances released a report on the effect and application of the Counter-Terrorism Law of China and its Regional Implementing Measures in Xinjiang, which states that:

The De-Extremism Regulations have been criticised by UN Special Procedures mandates for their lack of compliance with international human rights standards. Following the introduction of those laws, an estimated million Uyghurs and other Turkic Muslims have reportedly been sent to internment facilities under the guise of "counterterrorism and de-extremism" policies since 2016. (p.4) ...... In this context, previous communications by the Special Rapporteur on freedom of religion or belief and the Working Group on Arbitrary Detention have voiced their concern that the "re-education facilities", sometimes termed "vocational training centres", due to their coercive character, amount to detention centres. It is alleged that between 1 million to 1.5 million ethnic Uyghurs and other minorities in Xinjiang may have been arbitrary forced into these facilities, where there have been allegations of deaths in custody, physical and psychological abuse and torture, as well as lack of access to medical care. It is also reported that in several cases they have been denied free contact with their families and friends or been unable to inform them of their location and denied their basic freedom of movement.(p.8)

In February 2020, the UN demanded unobstructed access in advance of a proposed fact-finding visit to the region.

In June 2020, nearly 50 UN independent experts had repeatedly communicated with the Government of the People's Republic of China their alarm regarding the repression of fundamental freedoms in China. They had also raised their concerns regarding a range of issues of grave concern, including the collective repression of the population, especially religious and ethnic minorities in Xinjiang and Tibet.

In March 2021, sixteen UN human right experts raised grave concerns about the "alleged detention and forced labour of Muslim Uyghurs in China". The experts were appointed by the UN Human Rights Council, and several of them said they had "received information that connected over 150 domestic Chinese and foreign domiciled companies to serious allegations of human rights abuses against Uyghur workers". The experts also called for unrestricted access to China in order to conduct "fact-finding missions", meanwhile urging "global and domestic companies to closely scrutinize their supply chains".

The UN High Commissioner for Human Rights (HCHR) began to discuss the possibility of a visit to Xinjiang with China in order to examine "the impact on human rights of its policies" in September 2020. Since then, the HCHR's office has since been negotiating terms of access to China, but the High Commissioner has not visited the country. In a February 2021 speech to the UNHRC, the Chinese Foreign Minister stated that Xinjiang is "always open" and the country "welcomes the High Commissioner for Human Rights (HCHR) to visit Xinjiang". At a March 2021 meeting of the UNHRC, the United States ambassador condemned China's human rights abuses in Xinjiang as "crimes against humanity and genocide".

China has turned down multiple requests from the UN HCHR to investigate the region. In January 2022, unidentified sources told the South China Morning Post that UN rights chief Michelle Bachelet had secured a visit to Xinjiang, not to be framed as an investigation, some time during the first half of the year, as long as her office doesn't agree to the U.S. request of publishing its Xinjiang report ahead of the Beijing Winter Olympics. The visit occurred in May 2022. In a statement released by the UN, Bachelet said that she raised concerns in Xinjiang about the broad application of counter-terrorism and de-radicalisation measures (including their impacts on Uyghurs and other Muslim minorities) and encouraged the government to review such policies to ensure they fully comply with international human rights standards. Bachelet stated that while she was unable to investigate the full scale of the vocational educational and training centres (VETC), she raised with the Chinese government concerns about the lack of independent judicial oversight for the program, and said that the government provided assurances that the VETC system had been dismantled. U.S. rights advocates criticized Bachelet's visit as a propaganda victory for Beijing. The World Uyghur Congress and the Washington D.C.-based Campaign for Uyghurs called for her to resign, and Bachelet announced in June 2022 that she would step down from her role as UN human rights chief.

On 31 August 2022, Bachelet released a report on China's treatment of Uyghur Muslims and other Muslim minority groups in Xinjiang, the OHCHR Assessment of human rights concerns in the Xinjiang Uyghur Autonomous Region, People's Republic of China. The report found that China's treatment of these groups may amount to crimes against humanity. The report concludes that "serious human rights violations have been committed" in the province, which the report attributes to China's "application of counter-terrorism and counter-'extremism' strategies" targeting Uyghur Muslims and other Muslim minority groups. The report also said that "Allegations of patterns of torture or ill-treatment, including forced medical treatment and adverse conditions of detention, are credible, as are allegations of individual incidents of sexual and gender-based violence". China opposed the release of the report and claimed that it is based on "disinformation and lies". China also claimed that "All ethnic groups, including the Uygur, are equal members of the Chinese nation. Xinjiang has taken actions to fight terrorism and extremism in accordance with the law, effectively curbing the frequent occurrences of terrorist activities". On 6 October 2022, the UNHCR voted down a proposal to debate the alleged human rights abuses in Xinjiang.

On 31 October 2022, a joint statement was presented by United States Mission to the United Nations on behalf of 50 countries at the UN General Assembly Third Committee, expressing grave concern about ongoing human rights violations of Uyghurs and other Muslim minorities in Xinjiang. The statement highlighted the findings of the OHCHR assessment, which corroborated reports of arbitrary and discriminatory detention, and urged China to comply with international obligations.

At its 108th session in November 2022, the UN Committee on the Elimination of Racial Discrimination (CERD) adopted a decision under its early warning and urgent action procedure - urging the Chinese government to release all individuals arbitrarily detained in Xinjiang, to provide relatives of detained or disappeared individuals with detailed information about their status and well-being, and to cease all intimidation and reprisals against Uyghur and other Muslim ethnic minority communities from China as well as those who speak out in their defense.

In October 2023, 51 UN member states issued a joint statement condemning human rights abuses by the Chinese government against Uyghurs and other Turkic Muslim communities in Xinjiang. Citing a 2022 report by the UN High Commissioner for Human Rights, which found the violations may constitute crimes against humanity, the statement highlighted ongoing abuses including mass detention, forced labor, and cultural persecution. Signatories included the United States, United Kingdom, France, Germany, Japan, Australia, and others.

In March 2024, the United Nations High Commissioner for Human Rights, Volker Türk, called on China to implement the recommendations in the 2022 UN Human Rights Office report on Xinjiang.

On 9 September 2025, during a session on the sidelines of the United Nations Human Rights Council in Geneva, members of China's Uyghur minority and human rights advocates shared personal testimonies of family members detained in China's Xinjiang region, alleging long prison sentences handed down without due process. Rizwangul Nurmuhammad described how her brother was arrested in 2017 and sentenced to nine years in prison "with no justification other than his identity as Uyghur." Yalkun Uluyol, a researcher at Human Rights Watch, said his father was serving a 16-year sentence, while other relatives were imprisoned for terms ranging from 15 years to life. These accounts were shared as part of a broader call for UN High Commissioner for Human Rights Volker Türk to press China to act on the recommendations of a 2022 UN report that documented credible evidence of torture, arbitrary detention, and other abuses. Sophie Richardson, co-head of Chinese Human Rights Defenders, stated that the abuses were “widespread” and “systematic,” and called for stronger leadership from the High Commissioner and UN member states, emphasizing that “we are not short of recommendations... what we are short on is leadership.” A Chinese diplomat in attendance rejected the allegations, calling them “outright lies.”

==== Joint letters at the United Nations ====
In July 2019, 22 countries (Note: July 2019 signatories opposing China's actions in Xinjiang: Australia, Austria, Belgium, Canada, Denmark, Estonia, Finland, France, Germany, Iceland, Ireland, Japan, Latvia, Lithuania, Luxembourg, the Netherlands, New Zealand, Norway, Spain, Sweden, Switzerland, and the UK.) issued a joint letter to the 41st session of the United Nations Human Rights Council (UNHRC), condemning China's mass detention of Uyghurs and other minorities, calling upon China to "refrain from the arbitrary detention and restrictions on freedom of movement of Uyghurs, and other Muslim and minority communities in Xinjiang". In the same session, 50 countries (Note: July 2019 signatories supporting China's actions in Xinjiang: original signatories: Algeria, Angola, Bahrain, Belarus, Bolivia, Burkina Faso, Burundi, Cambodia, Cameroon, Comoros, The Congo, Cuba, Democratic Republic of the Congo, Egypt, Eritrea, Gabon, Kuwait, Laos, Myanmar, Nigeria, North Korea, Oman, Pakistan, The Philippines, ~~Qatar~~ (see below), Russia, Saudi Arabia, Somalia, South Sudan, Sudan, Syria, Tajikistan, Togo, Turkmenistan, United Arab Emirates, Venezuela, and Zimbabwe; subsequently added signatories: Bangladesh, Djibuti, Equatorial Guinea, Iran, Iraq, Mozambique, Nepal, Palestine (the Palestinian Authority), Serbia, South Sudan, Uganda, Uzbekistan, Yemen, Zambia.; Note that Qatar quickly retracted their support after originally signing.) issued a joint letter supporting China's Xinjiang policies, criticizing the practice of "politicizing human rights issues". The letter stated, "China has invited a number of diplomats, international organizations officials and journalist to Xinjiang" and that "what they saw and heard in Xinjiang completely contradicted what was reported in the media." Qatar formally withdrew its name from the counter-statement on 18 July, six days after it was published, expressing a desire "to maintain a neutral stance and we offer our mediation and facilitation services."

In October 2019, 23 countries (Note: Including the US, Canada, Japan and Australia.) issued a joint statement to the UN urging China to "uphold its national and international obligations and commitments to respect human rights". In response, 54 countries (Note: Including Belarus, Pakistan, Russia, Egypt, Bolivia, Democratic Republic of the Congo, and Serbia.) (including China itself) issued a joint statement in the same day supporting China's Xinjiang policies. The statement spoke positively of the results of counter-terrorism and de-radicalization measures in Xinjiang and held that these measures have effectively safeguarded the basic human rights of people of all ethnic groups." Civil society groups in Muslim-majority countries with governments that have supported China's policies in Xinjiang have been noted to be uncomfortable with their governments' stance and have organized boycotts, protests, and media campaigns concerning Uyghurs.

In October 2020, more countries at the UN joined the condemnation of China over human rights abuses in Xinjiang with German Ambassador Christoph Heusgen speaking on behalf of the group. The total number of countries that condemned China increased to 39, (Note: October 2020 signatories opposing China's actions in Xinjiang: Albania, Australia, Austria, Belgium, Bosnia and Herzegovina, Bulgaria, Canada, Croatia, Denmark, Estonia, Finland, France, Germany, Haiti, Honduras, Iceland, Ireland, Italy, Japan, Latvia, Liechtenstein, Lithuania, Luxembourg, Marshall Islands, Monaco, Nauru, Netherlands, New Zealand, North Macedonia, Norway, Palau, Poland, Slovakia, Slovenia, Spain, Sweden, Switzerland, the U.K., and the U.S.A.) while the total number of countries that defended China decreased to 45. (Note: October 2020 signatories supporting China's actions in Xinjiang: Angola, Bahrain, Belarus, Burundi, Cambodia, Cameroon, Central African Republic, China, Comoros, Democratic Republic of Congo, Cuba, Dominica, Egypt, Equatorial Guinea, Eritrea, Gabon, Grenada, Guinea, Guinea-Bissau, Iran, Iraq, Kiribati, Laos, Madagascar, Morocco, Mozambique, Myanmar, Nepal, Nicaragua, North Korea, Pakistan, State of Palestine, Russia, Saudi Arabia, South Sudan, Sri Lanka, Sudan, Syria, Tanzania, Togo, Uganda, the U.A.E., Venezuela, Yemen, and Zimbabwe.) Sixteen countries (Note: October 2020 non-signatories to the statement supporting China's actions in Xinjiang who had expressed support in 2019: Algeria, Bangladesh, Bolivia, Burkina Faso, Republic of Congo, Djibouti, Kuwait, Nigeria, Oman, the Philippines, Serbia, Somalia, Tajikistan, Turkmenistan, Uzbekistan, and Zambia.) that defended China in 2019 did not do so in 2020.

At the 46th session of the Human Rights Council, Cuba delivered a joint statement supporting China, signed by 64 countries.

In June 2021, over 60 parliamentarians from 18 countries sent a joint letter calling for the UN to launch a Commission of Inquiry into alleged genocide and crimes against humanity in Xinjiang. The letter, coordinated by the Inter-Parliamentary Alliance on China, was addressed to the President of the Human Rights Council and foreign ministers of eight democratic states represented on the council, urging the UN to investigate and identify perpetrators of abuses against Uyghurs and other minorities.

Public statements of support and condemnation of Chinese policies in Xinjiang, based on joint letters at the UN
Country	Position in July 2019	Position in October 2019	Position in October 2020	Position in March 2021
Afghanistan				
Albania		Condemn	Condemn	Condemn
Algeria	Support			Support
Andorra				
Angola	Support	Support	Support	
Antigua and Barbuda		Support		Support
Argentina				
Armenia				
Australia	Condemn	Condemn	Condemn	Condemn
Austria	Condemn	Condemn	Condemn	Condemn
Azerbaijan				
Bahamas				
Bahrain	Support		Support	Support
Bangladesh	Support	Support		
Barbados				
Belarus	Support	Support	Support	Support
Belgium	Condemn	Condemn	Condemn	Condemn
Belize				
Benin				
Bhutan				
Bolivia	Support	Support		Support
Bosnia and Herzegovina			Condemn	Condemn
Botswana				
Brazil				
Brunei Darussalam				
Bulgaria			Condemn	Condemn
Burkina Faso	Support	Support		Support
Burundi	Support	Support	Support	Support
Cabo Verde				
Cambodia	Support	Support	Support	Support
Cameroon	Support	Support	Support	Support
Canada	Condemn	Condemn	Condemn	Condemn
Central African Republic		Support	Support	Support
Chad		Support		
Chile				
China	China	China	China	China
Colombia				
Comoros	Support	Support	Support	Support
Congo	Support	Support	Support	
Democratic Republic of the Congo	Support	Support		
Costa Rica				
Côte d'Ivoire [Ivory Coast]				
Croatia			Condemn	Condemn
Cuba	Support	Support	Support	Support
Cyprus				
Czechia				
Denmark	Condemn	Condemn	Condemn	Condemn
Djibouti	Support	Support		Support
Dominica			Support	Support
Dominican Republic				
Ecuador				
Egypt	Support	Support	Support	Support
El Salvador				
Equatorial Guinea	Support	Support	Support	Support
Eritrea	Support	Support	Support	Support
Estonia	Condemn	Condemn	Condemn	Condemn
Eswatini [Swaziland]				
Ethiopia				Support
Fiji				
Finland	Condemn	Condemn	Condemn	Condemn
France	Condemn	Condemn	Condemn	Condemn
Gabon	Support	Support	Support	Support
Gambia				Support
Georgia				
Germany	Condemn	Condemn	Condemn	Condemn
Ghana				
Greece				
Grenada			Support	Support
Guatemala				
Guinea		Support	Support	Support
Guinea-Bissau		Support	Support	Support
Guyana				
Haiti			Condemn	Condemn
The Vatican				
Honduras			Condemn	Condemn
Hungary				
Iceland	Condemn	Condemn	Condemn	Condemn
India				
Indonesia				
Iran	Support	Support	Support	Support
Iraq	Support	Support	Support	Support
Ireland	Condemn	Condemn	Condemn	Condemn
Israel				
Italy			Condemn	Condemn
Jamaica				
Japan	Condemn	Condemn	Condemn	Condemn
Jordan				
Kazakhstan				
Kenya				
Kiribati			Support	Support
North Korea	Support	Support	Support	Support
South Korea				
Kuwait	Support			
Kyrgyzstan				
Laos	Support	Support	Support	Support
Latvia	Condemn	Condemn	Condemn	Condemn
Lebanon				Support
Lesotho				Support
Liberia				
Libya				
Liechtenstein		Condemn	Condemn	Condemn
Lithuania	Condemn	Condemn	Condemn	Condemn
Luxembourg	Condemn	Condemn	Condemn	Condemn
Madagascar			Support	
Malawi				
Malaysia				
Maldives				
Mali				
Malta				
Marshall Islands			Condemn	Condemn
Mauritania		Support		Support
Mauritius				
Mexico				
Micronesia				
Moldova				
Monaco			Condemn	Condemn
Mongolia				
Montenegro				
Morocco			Support	Support
Mozambique	Support	Support	Support	Support
Myanmar	Support	Support	Support	Support
Namibia				
Nauru			Condemn	Condemn
Nepal	Support	Support	Support	Support
Netherlands	Condemn	Condemn	Condemn	
New Zealand	Condemn	Condemn	Condemn	
Nicaragua		Support	Support	Support
Niger		Support		Support
Nigeria	Support	Support		
North Macedonia			Condemn	Condemn
Norway	Condemn	Condemn	Condemn	Condemn
Oman	Support	Support		Support
Pakistan	Support	Support	Support	Support
Palau			Condemn	Condemn
Palestine		Support	Support	Support
Panama				
Papua New Guinea				Support
Paraguay				
Peru				
Philippines	Support	Support		
Poland			Condemn	
Portugal				
Qatar				
Romania				
Russia	Support	Support	Support	Support
Rwanda				
Samoa				
San Marino				
São Tomé and Príncipe				Support
Saudi Arabia	Support		Support	Support
Senegal				
Serbia	Support	Support		Support
Seychelles				
Sierra Leone		Support		Support
Singapore				
Slovakia			Condemn	Condemn
Slovenia			Condemn	Condemn
Solomon Islands		Support		Support
Somalia	Support			Support
South Africa				
South Sudan	Support	Support	Support	Support
Spain	Condemn		Condemn	Condemn
Sri Lanka	Support	Support	Support	Support
Sudan	Support	Support	Support	Support
Suriname		Support		
Sweden	Condemn	Condemn	Condemn	Condemn
Switzerland	Condemn		Condemn	Condemn
Syria	Support	Support	Support	Support
Tajikistan	Support			Support
Tanzania		Support	Support	Support
Thailand				
Timor-Leste				
Togo	Support	Support	Support	Support
Tonga				
Trinidad and Tobago				
Tunisia				Support
Turkey				
Turkmenistan	Support			
Tuvalu				
Uganda	Support	Support	Support	Support
Ukraine				
United Arab Emirates	Support	Support	Support	Support
United Kingdom	Condemn	Condemn	Condemn	Condemn
United States of America		Condemn	Condemn	Condemn
Uruguay				
Uzbekistan	Support			
Vanuatu				
Venezuela	Support	Support	Support	Support
Vietnam				
Yemen	Support		Support	Support
Zambia	Support	Support		Support
Zimbabwe	Support	Support	Support	Support

Date	Support	Condemn
July 2019	50 (including China)	22
October 2019	54 (including China)	23
October 2020	45 (including China)	39

In Sep 2023, OHCHR released a press release concerning the forced separations for Uyghur children and the cultural consequence.

In Oct 2025, OHCHR released a press release concerning the cases of artist Yaxia'er Xiaohelaiti and scholar Rahile Dawut, also the use of expansive and ambiguous counter-extremism laws.

In Jan 2026, OHCHR released a press release concerning reports of forced labor of Uyghur, Tibetan and other minorities.

=== European Union ===
On 11 September 2018, Federica Mogherini, the High Representative of the European Union for Foreign Affairs and Security Policy, raised the re-education camps issue in European Parliament. She said:

The most outstanding disagreement we have with China concerns the human rights situation in China, as underlined in your Report. We also focused on the situation in Xinjiang, especially the expansion of political re-education camps. And we discussed the detention of human rights defenders, including particular cases.

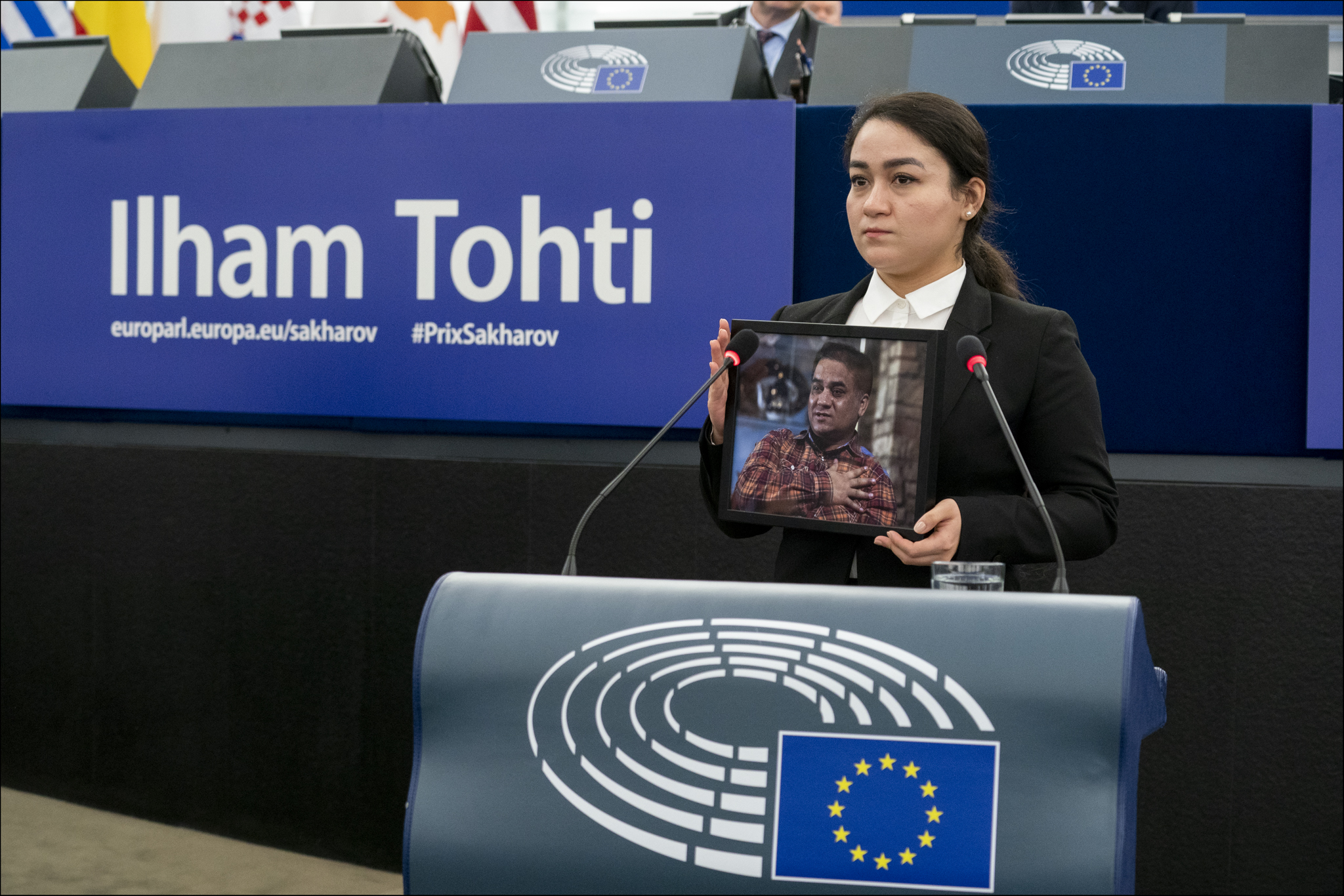
The daughter of Ilham Tohti accepted the 2019 Sakharov Prize for Freedom of Thought on behalf of her imprisoned father.

On 19 December 2019, the European Parliament passed a non-binding resolution condemning the mass incarceration of Uyghurs and calling on EU companies with supply chains in the region to ensure that they are not complicit with crimes against humanity.

In 2019, the European Parliament awarded its Sakharov Prize for Freedom and Thought to Ilham Tohti, a Uyghur intellectual and activist who had been sentenced to life in prison on charges pertaining to Uyghur separatism. As of March 2021, China has prohibited European Union diplomats from visiting Tohti. The European Union has called upon China to release Tohti from his detention in prison.

On 17 December 2020, the European Parliament adopted a resolution that strongly condemns China over allegations of forced labor by ethnic and religious minorities. In the statement, the EU body said Parliament "strongly condemns the government-led system of forced labor, in particular the exploitation of Uyghur, ethnic Kazakh and Kyrgyz, and other Muslim minority groups, in factories both within and outside of internment camps in Xinjiang, as well as the transfer of forced laborers to other Chinese administrative divisions, and the fact that well-known European brands and companies have been benefiting from the use of forced labor."

On 22 March 2021, the European Union, joined by the United States, the United Kingdom and Canada, imposed sanctions on four senior Chinese officials and the Public Security Bureau of the Xinjiang Production and Construction Corps over the human rights abuses of Uyghurs in Xinjiang. Among those sanctioned by the EU was Zhu Hailun who was described as the architect of the indoctrination program. This was the first sanction by the EU against China since the 1989 Tiananmen Square massacre. In the same month, negotiations for a group of ambassadors from European Union countries to visit Xinjiang stalled due to the Chinese government's denial of their request to visit Ilham Tohti, an imprisoned Uyghur scholar.

On 9 June 2022, the European Parliament adopted a motion condemning measures taken against the Uyghur community in China, stating that "credible evidence about birth prevention measures and the separation of Uyghur children from their families amount to crimes against humanity and represent a serious risk of genocide" and calling on authorities "to cease all government-sponsored programmes of forced labour and mass forced sterilisation and to put an immediate end to any measures aimed at preventing births in the Uyghur population, including forced abortions or sanctions for birth control violations".

=== World Bank ===
On 11 November 2019, the World Bank issued a statement:

In line with standard practice, immediately after receiving a series of serious allegations in August 2019 in connection with the Xinjiang Technical and Vocational Education and Training Project, the Bank launched a fact-finding review, and World Bank senior managers traveled to Xinjiang to gather information directly. After receiving the allegations, no disbursements were made on the project. The team conducted a thorough review of project documents... The review did not substantiate the allegations. In light of the risks associated with the partner schools, which are widely dispersed and difficult to monitor, the scope and footprint of the project is being reduced. Specifically, the project component that involves the partner schools in Xinjiang is being closed.

=== Organization for Islamic Cooperation ===
The Organisation of Islamic Cooperation (OIC) visited China as part of a greater investigation into the treatment of Muslims in non-OIC member states. On 1 March 2019, OIC produced a document which "commends the efforts of the People's Republic of China in providing care to its Muslim citizens." A coalition of American Muslim groups criticized the OIC's decision and accused member states of being influenced by Chinese power. The groups included the Council on American-Islamic Relations.

== Reactions by country ==
=== Africa ===
Several African countries, including Algeria, the Democratic Republic of the Congo, Egypt, Nigeria, and Somalia, signed a July 2019 letter that publicly praised China's human rights record and dismissed reported abuses in Xinjiang. Other African countries, including Angola, Burundi, Cameroon, the Central African Republic, Madagascar, Morocco, Mozambique and Sudan, signed an October 2019 letter that publicly expressed support for China's treatment of Uyghurs. Algeria, Burkina Faso, Republic of Congo, Djibouti, Nigeria, Somalia, and Zambia were among the 16 countries that defended China's policies in Xinjiang in 2019 but did not do so in 2020.

In 2021, ambassadors from Burkina Faso, Republic of Congo, and Sudan made statements in support of China's Xinjiang policies. Burkina Faso's ambassador stated that Western allegations of forced labor and genocide are groundless. Sudan's ambassador stated that the Xinjiang issue is not about human rights, but rather is a political weapon used by Western countries against China. African countries which are members of the UNHRC had a significant impact in narrowly defeating a proposal in October 2022 by that body to debate human rights in Xinjiang. Somalia was the only African UNHRC member voting in favor of debate.

=== Americas ===
==== Canada ====
In July 2020, The Globe and Mail reported that human rights activists, including retired politician Irwin Cotler, were urging the Parliament of Canada to recognize the abuses against Uyghurs in China as genocide and to impose sanctions on the officials responsible.

On 21 October 2020, the Subcommittee on International Human Rights (SDIR) of the Canadian House of Commons Standing Committee on Foreign Affairs and International Development condemned the persecution of Uyghurs and other Turkic Muslims in Xinjiang by the Government of China and concluded that the Chinese Communist Party's actions amount to the genocide of the Uyghurs per the Genocide Convention.

On 22 February 2021, the Canadian House of Commons voted 266–0 to approve a motion that formally recognizes China as committing genocide against its Muslim minorities. Prime Minister Justin Trudeau and his cabinet did not vote. China's Ambassador to Canada responded to the motion by calling the allegations of genocide and forced labor the "lie of the century." In June 2021, Canada's Senate voted 29–33 against a motion to recognize the treatment of Uyghurs as genocide and to call for the 2022 Winter Olympics to be moved out of China should such treatment continue.

On 11 April 2021, Global Affairs Canada issued a travel advisory stating that individuals with "familial or ethnic ties" could be "at risk of arbitrary detention" by Chinese authorities when traveling in the Xinjiang region. Radio Canada International reported that the announcement described that China had been "increasingly detaining ethnic and Muslim minorities in the region without due process."

In 2023, the House of Commons unanimously voted in favour of a non-binding motion to accept 10,000 Uyghur refugees fleeing persecution in China over the course of two years. The idea was to resettle them from countries such as Turkey rather than directly from China since Parliament member Sameer Zuberi, who proposed the motion, argued there was no safe way to do the latter.

On 31 March 2026, Canadian Prime Minister Mark Carney refused to call China's treatment of Uyghurs a genocide, though he did say "there are fundamental issues in terms of China’s treatment of the Uyghurs in the past, and they’ve been rightly called out".

==== Cuba ====
On 6 October 2020, Cuba delivered a joint statement with 45 other countries voicing their support of China's measures in Xinjiang.

==== United States ====
On 3 April 2018, U.S. Senator Marco Rubio and Representative Chris Smith sent a letter urging Ambassador to China Terry Branstad to launch an investigation into the reported mass detention of Uyghurs in political re-education camps in Xinjiang.

On 26 July 2018, Vice President of the United States Mike Pence raised the re-education camps issue at Ministerial to Advance Religious Freedom. He said that "Sadly, as we speak as well, Beijing is holding hundreds of thousands, and possibly millions, of Uyghur Muslims in so-called 're-education camps', where they're forced to endure around-the-clock political indoctrination and to denounce their religious beliefs and their cultural identity as the goal."

On 26 July 2018, the Congressional-Executive Commission on China, an independent agency of the U.S. government which monitors human rights and rule of law developments in the People's Republic of China, released a report that said as many as a million people are or have been detained in what are being called "political re-education" centers, the largest mass incarceration of an ethnic minority population in the world today. On 27 July 2018, The U.S. Embassy & Consulate in China released Ministerial to Advance Religious Freedom Statement on China, which mentioned the detention of hundreds of thousands, and possibly millions, of Uyghurs and members of other Muslim minority groups in "political re-education camps", and called the Chinese government to release immediately all those arbitrarily detained.

On 28 August 2018, U.S. senator Marco Rubio and 16 other members of Congress urged the United States to impose sanctions under the Global Magnitsky Human Rights Accountability Act against Chinese officials who are responsible for human rights abuses in Xinjiang. In a letter to Secretary of State Mike Pompeo and Treasury Secretary Steven Mnuchin, they called for the sanctions on Chen Quanguo who is the current Communist Party Secretary of the Xinjiang (the highest post in an administrative unit of China) and six other Chinese officials and two businesses that make surveillance equipment in Xinjiang.

U.S. Secretary of State Mike Pompeo criticized Iran's Supreme Leader Ayatollah Ali Khamenei for his refusal to condemn the Chinese government's repressions against the Uyghurs.

On 3 May 2019, U.S. Assistant Secretary of Defense for Indo-Pacific Security Affairs Randall Schriver condemned the detention of Uyghurs as concentration camps.

UN counter-terrorism chief Vladimir Voronkov visited Xinjiang in June 2019. The visit prompted anger from the U.S. State Department. The U.S. has called these visits "highly choreographed" and characterized them as having "propagated false narratives."

On 11 September 2019, the U.S. Senate unanimously passed the Uyghur Human Rights Policy Act. On 3 December 2019, the U.S. House of Representatives passed a stronger version of the Uyghur Human Rights Policy Act by a vote of 407 to 1. The bill was signed into law on 17 June 2020.

On 8 January 2020, the Congressional-Executive Commission on China released its annual report, which stated that Chinese government actions in Xinjiang may constitute crimes against humanity.

In April 2020, United States lawmakers from the Congressional-Executive Commission on China, led by Jim McGovern and Marco Rubio, introduced the Uyghur Forced Labor Prevention Act that aims to prevent the importation of Chinese products tied to evidence of unfree labor.

In June 2020, Trump's former national security adviser John Bolton claimed that President Donald Trump told Chinese leader Xi Jinping that China's decision to detain Uyghurs in re-education camps was "exactly the right thing to do".

On 17 June 2020, the United States Congress passed the Uyghur Human Rights Policy Act in reaction to the internment camps. Lawmakers also proposed the Uyghur Forced Labor Prevention Act requiring the assumption that all Xinjiang goods are made with forced labor and therefore banned. On 9 July 2020, the Trump administration imposed sanctions and visa restrictions against senior Chinese officials, including Chen Quanguo. The same month, sanctions under the Global Magnitsky Act were levied against the Xinjiang Production and Construction Corps and related officials including Sun Jinlong and Peng Jiarui.

On 14 September 2020, the U.S. Department of Homeland Security blocked imports of products from five entities in Xinjiang to combat the use of forced labor, while shelving broader proposed bans. A senior US diplomat called upon other countries to join the United States denunciations against the Chinese government's policies in Xinjiang. Senators Cornyn, Merkley, Cardin, and Rubio signed a letter to request Mike Pompeo, the United States Secretary of State, to issue a determination of genocide. The National Review reports that "U.S. government genocide determinations are an incredibly tricky thing. They require solid evidence to meet the criteria set out under the 1948 Genocide Convention." When determinations are issued there isn't much change or an effect that they will bring in the short run. Although, "there's a strong, well-documented case for a determination in this case." As of November 2020, US Senators Menendez and Cornyn are leading a bipartisan group to recognize the CCP's actions in Xinjiang as a genocide by way of a Senate resolution, which would make the United States Senate the first government to "officially recognize the situation as a genocide."

On 22 September 2020, the United States House of Representatives passed the Uyghur Forced Labor Prevention Act.

On 19 January 2021, Pompeo announced that the United States Department of State had determined that "genocide and crimes against humanity" had been perpetrated by China against the Uyghurs, with Pompeo stating: "the People's Republic of China, under the direction and control of the Chinese Communist Party, has committed genocide and crimes against humanity against the predominantly Muslim Uighurs and other ethnic and religious minority groups, including ethnic Kazakhs and Kyrgyz... [i]n the anguished cries from Xinjiang, the U.S. hears the echoes of Nazi Germany, Rwanda, Bosnia and Darfur." The announcement was made on the last full day of the Donald Trump presidency. This made the United States the first country in the world to make such a designation. China responded a day later by sanctioning US officials in the outgoing Trump administration, including Pompeo, for their criticisms of China's treatment of the Uyghurs.

At the end of the Trump presidency, the incoming Biden administration had already declared as the Joe Biden 2020 presidential campaign that such a determination should be made, and that America would continue to recognize the Xinjiang activity as a genocide. On 16 February 2021, U.S. President Joe Biden commented in a CNN town hall meeting in Wisconsin that Xi Jinping's rationale for justifying his policies, the idea that there "must be a united, tightly controlled China", derives from the fact that "Culturally, there are different norms that each country and their leaders are expected to follow." He also promised in the same meeting that "there will be repercussions for China" for its human rights violations. Some sources interpreted Biden's statements as excusing Chinese policy towards Uyghurs on cultural relativist grounds, whereas an opposite view deemed it a misrepresentation.

In July 2021 while speaking at the Singaporean branch of the International Institute for Strategic Studies American Secretary of Defense Lloyd Austin remarked on "genocide and crimes against humanity against Uighur Muslims in Xinjiang."

On 9 July 2021 The US Department of Commerce's Bureau of Industry and Security (BIS) added 14 entities, that are based in the People's Republic of China (PRC) and have enabled Beijing's campaign of repression, mass detention, and high-technology surveillance against Uyghurs, Kazakhs, and members of other Muslim minority groups in the Xinjiang Uyghur Autonomous Regions of China (XUAR), where the PRC continues to commit genocide and crimes against humanity, to the Entity List. The Entity List is a tool utilized by BIS to restrict the export, reexport, and transfer (in-country) of items subject to the Export Administration Regulations.

In March 2023, the House of Representatives Select Committee on the Chinese Communist Party held hearings on what Washington says is an ongoing genocide against Uyghurs and other ethnic minorities in China's Xinjiang region.

In April 2024, US Secretary of State Antony Blinken accused China of continuing to commit genocide against the Uyghurs and other Muslim minorities in Xinjiang. Since 2024, Xinjiang has featured less prominently in relations between the US and China. The second administration of Donald Trump has mentioned the issue of Uyghurs and Xinjiang much less.

=== Asia ===
==== China ====
Chinese government officials and many Chinese people state that foreign discourses cast in terms of genocide, human rights abuses, and concentration camps show foreign political bias and ignorance of the facts. Academics Steve Tsang and Olivia Cheung write that "the overwhelming majority of people in China reject the Western criticisms and buy into the Xi narrative and consider China’s policy toward the minorities, including the Uyghurs, positive and beneficial".

China contends that the Gaza war demonstrates the hypocrisy of Western criticisms of China's treatment of Uyghurs. According to this view, if Western countries were genuinely concerned about human rights, they would focus instead on the negative humanitarian impact of Israeli military operations in Gaza. Following a 2024 statement by U.S. Secretary of State Antony Blinken which equated the suffering of Muslims in Xinjiang with the suffering of Muslims in Gaza, the Foreign Ministry of the PRC responded, "There is no conflict in Xinjiang, but the conflict is in the Gaza Strip. Muslims in Xinjiang are not suffering from hunger, expulsion, and killing, but the millions of Muslims in the Gaza Strip are suffering from hunger, expulsion, and killing. The US should stop playing double standards on human rights ..."

China has granted scholarships for Indonesian santri to study in the country and promote Beijing's narrative on Xinjiang.

On 10 August 2018, about 47 Chinese intellectuals and others issued an appeal against what they describe as "shocking human rights atrocities perpetrated in Xinjiang".

In December 2019, during the anti-government protests in Hong Kong, a mixed crowd of young and elderly people, numbering around 1,000 and dressed in black and wearing masks to shield their identities, held up signs reading "Free Uyghur, Free Hong Kong" and "Fake 'autonomy' in China results in genocide". They rallied calmly, waving Uyghur flags and posters. The local riot police pepper sprayed demonstrators to disperse the crowd.

==== North Korea ====
North Korea signed both statements at the UN (in July and October 2019) that supported China's Xinjiang policies. On 29 January 2021, North Korea's Ministry of Foreign Affairs released a statement defending China's policies, accusing Western countries of creating a "human rights virus" that is "doomed to failure". It said that "Xinjiang Uyghur population has increased from 5.55 million to 12 million during more than 40 years and the total volume of production increased by 7.2% every year in the period of 2014~2019. Such successes achieved in the socio-economic development of Xinjiang demonstrate the very validity of the policy of the Chinese Party on ethnic minorities and development of ethnic regions".

==== Japan ====
On 26 November 2019, Japanese Foreign Minister Toshimitsu Motegi said Japan was "monitoring the human rights situation in the Xinjiang Uygur Autonomous Region with concern" and that he brought up Japan's position with State Councilor Wang Yi in their meeting on 25 November.

==== Taiwan ====
According to Radio Free Asia, the Legislative Yuan passed a resolution recognizing state treatment of Uyghurs in Xinjiang as genocide in December 2022.

=== Middle East ===
The Muslim-majority countries like the United Arab Emirates, Saudi Arabia and Egypt were showing open support towards the Asian nation, stating that "China has the right to take anti‐terrorism and de‐extremism measures". The Arab nations were neglecting the human rights abuses to not ruin the economic ties they maintained with China, which is a crucial trading partner and investor for these countries. Moreover, the exiled Uyghur Muslims in these countries were regularly being detained and deported back to China.

Many countries in the Middle East signed a UN document defending China's human rights record. Iraq and Iran have also signed the document while Saudi Arabia and Egypt have been accused of deporting Uyghurs to China. The United Arab Emirates has formally defended China's human rights records. These countries have appreciated China's respect for the principle of non-interference in other countries' affairs and have therefore placed significance on their economic and political relations.

At the 2020 ministerial meeting of the China–Arab States Cooperation Forum, the Arab countries stated that they supported China's position on Xinjiang.

In an April 2021 group interview with CGTN anchor Liu Xin following their visit to Xinjiang, Syrian and Palestinian ambassadors to China Imad Moustapha and Fariz Mehdawi respectively accused Western media of intentionally overlooking "the economic, social and cultural rights that Muslim Uyghurs and other ethnic minorities enjoy in the region." RFA journalist Shohret Hoshur criticised their responses and cited a past interview with Uyghur mother Patigul Ghulam as she was looking for her son killed in the 2009 Ürümqi riots, who said the Uyghurs were in a worse situation than the Palestinians and Syrians.

==== Egypt ====
Egypt signed both statements at the UN (in July and October 2019) that supported China's Xinjiang policies. Egypt has been accused of deporting Uyghurs to China.

==== Qatar ====
Qatar supported China's policies in Xinjiang until 21 August 2019; Qatar was the first Middle Eastern country to withdraw its defense of the Xinjiang camps.

==== Iran ====
In a December 2016 report, the research unit of the Iranian state-owned television's external services said that China is not opposed to Muslims, but instead to pro-Saudi radical ideology. In August 2020, Ali Motahari, a former member of the Iranian Parliament, tweeted that the Iranian government has kept silent about the situation of Muslims in China because the government of Iran needs China's economic support. He said that this silence has been humiliating for the Islamic Republic. Critics of Motahari responded that China was opposed to Wahabism, and had no problem with Islam or Chinese Muslims.

Iran signed an October 2019 letter that publicly expressed support for China's treatment of Uyghurs.

In December 2025, in response to what Iran perceived as China's support for the UAE's claims over disputed Persian Gulf islands, conservative lawmaker Ahmad Naderi sharply criticized Beijing, pointing out that Iran had thus far "acted rationally" in addressing concerns over China's treatment of Muslims in Xinjiang, but cautioned that Tehran might reassess its approach if its territorial "red lines were crossed."

==== Israel ====
In 2021, Israel voted to condemn China's actions in the UNHRC; a sudden break in China–Israel relations.

==== Palestine ====
In July 2020, Xi Jinping met with Palestinian President Mahmoud Abbas to express Beijing's "full support" for the two-state solution to the Israeli–Palestinian conflict, saying that "China and Palestine are good brothers, good friends and good partners". Abbas then voiced support for China's "legitimate position on Hong Kong, Xinjiang and other matters concerning China's core interests."

After Palestinian ambassador to China Fariz Mehdawi visited Xinjiang in March 2021, he remarked on Chinese state media that he was impressed by the region's infrastructure and upkeep of mosques, saying "if you have to calculate it all, it's something like 2,000 inhabitants for one mosque. This ratio, we don't have it in our country. It's not available anywhere." RFA journalist Shohret Hoshur wrote in response that Mehdawi was neglecting the harsh reality of locals with whom he had met and who had no ability to speak the truth under the watch of officials, adding that his true motivation seemed to be a shared anti-US agenda with China.

==== Saudi Arabia ====
Saudi Arabia supports China's approach in Xinjiang, and in February 2019, Saudi Arabia's Crown Prince Mohammad bin Salman defended China's use of the camps, saying "China has the right to carry out anti-terrorism and de-extremisation work for its national security."

Saudi Arabia was among the 24 countries (excluding China) that backed China's position at the UN Human Rights Council in July 2019, and again at the UN General Assembly in October 2020.

==== Syria ====
In December 2019, the Syrian Ministry of Foreign Affairs and Expatriates defended China's actions in Xinjiang days after the US condemnation, stating that it is a "blatant interference by the US in the internal affairs of the People's Republic of China." The statement concluded that "Syria emphasizes the right of China to preserve its sovereignty, people, territorial integrity, and security and protect the security and property of the state and individuals."

==== United Arab Emirates ====
According to the Associated Press, a young Chinese woman, Wu Huan was captured for eight days in a Chinese-run secret detention site in Dubai. She revealed that at least two other Uyghur prisoners were detained with her at a villa turned into jail. Critics have largely criticized the UAE for its supporting role in detaining as well as deporting the Uyghur Muslims and other Chinese political dissidents at the orders of the Chinese government.

=== Post-Soviet states ===
Russia, Belarus, Turkmenistan and Tajikistan have expressed support for China's policies in Xinjiang. Russia signed both statements at the UN (in July and October 2019) that supported China's Xinjiang policies. NPR reported that Kazakhstan and "its neighbors in the mostly Muslim region of Central Asia that have benefited from Chinese investment aren't speaking up for the Muslims inside internment camps in China".

==== Belarus ====
On 5 March 2021, a group of 65 member states—led by Belarus—expressed their support of China's Xinjiang policy and opposed the "unfounded allegations against China based on disinformation" at the 44th session of Human Rights Council.

==== Kazakhstan ====
In November 2017, Kazakhstan's Ambassador to China Shahrat Nuryshev met with Chinese Vice Minister of Foreign Affairs Li Huilai regarding Kazakh diaspora issues.

==== Russia ====
On 4 February 2019, Russian Foreign Minister Sergey Lavrov said he was not aware of reports about political re-education camps in China's Xinjiang Uygur Autonomous Region, though he had seen the US actively raising the issue.

In July 2019, Russia signed the letter supporting China at the UN Human Rights Council.

On 9 October 2019, Lavrov said that "China has repeatedly given explanations concerning the accusations that you have mentioned probably citing our Western colleagues. We have no reason to take any steps other than the procedures that exist at the UN that I mentioned, such as at the Human Rights Council and its Universal Periodic Reviews."

=== South Asia ===
Nepal, Pakistan and Sri Lanka have signed a UN document supporting China's policies in Xinjiang.

==== Pakistan ====
Pakistan signed both statements at the UN (in July and October 2019) that supported China's Xinjiang policies.

On 19 January 2020, Pakistani Prime Minister Imran Khan was asked why he was not more outspoken about the situation of Uyghurs in China. He said that he has not been as outspoken primarily because the human rights situation in Kashmir and Citizenship Amendment Act were problems much larger in scale. He said that the second reason was that China has been a great friend of Pakistan and had helped Pakistan through their toughest time with the economic crisis, so that "the way we deal with China is that when we talk about things, we talk about privately. We do not talk about things with China in public right now because they are very sensitive. That's how they deal with issues."

In July 2021, Prime Minister Imran Khan said in an interview that he believes "the Chinese version" of the facts pertaining to abuses in Xinjiang and argued that undue attention was being given to Xinjiang relative to human rights violations in other regions of the world, such as in Kashmir.

=== Southeast Asia ===
Cambodia, Laos, Myanmar, and the Philippines have issued statements of support for China's policies. According to The Moscow Times, Thailand, Malaysia, and Cambodia have all deported Uyghur people at China's request. In 2020, Malaysia minister Mohd Redzuan Md Yusof said that Malaysia would not entertain requests from Beijing to extradite Uyghurs if they felt their safety was at risk.

==== Indonesia ====
In December 2018, leaders of the Muslim organization Muhammadiyah issued an open letter citing reports of violence against the "weak and innocent" community of Uyghurs and asking Beijing to explain. Soon after, Beijing responded by inviting more than a dozen top Indonesian religious leaders to the Xinjiang province and camps, and criticism greatly diminished. Since then, Indonesia's largest Muslim organizations have purportedly treated reports of widespread human rights violations in Xinjiang with skepticism, dismissing them as U.S. propaganda.

In October 2022, the Indonesian delegation for the UNHCR voted against debate in the chamber on the topic of the treatment of Uyghurs in Xinjiang as it "will not yield meaningful progress", but Ambassador Febrian Ruddyard also stated, "As the world's largest Muslim country and a vibrant democracy, we cannot close our eyes to the plight of our Muslim brothers and sisters."

=== Europe ===
==== Belgium ====
On 15 March 2021, the Walloon Parliament voted to approve a motion condemning the "unacceptable" practices introduced by the Chinese government, including the exploitation of Uyghurs and all other ethnic minorities, in Xinjiang. All parties voted in favor, with the exception of the Workers' Party, which abstained. In May 2021, testimony about the situation in Xinjiang to the foreign affairs committee of the Belgian chamber of representatives had to be postponed after a massive DDOS attack on the .be domain. In June 2021, the Belgian Parliament's foreign relations committee passed a motion condemning the abuses as crimes against humanity and stating that there was a "serious risk of genocide" in Xinjiang.

==== Czech Republic ====
In June 2021, the Czech Senate unanimously passed a motion condemning the abuses against the Uyghurs as both genocide and crimes against humanity.

==== France ====
In November 2019, French Foreign Minister Jean-Yves Le Drian called on China to close down the camps. He also called on China to permit the UN High Commissioner for Human Rights to visit Xinjiang at the earliest possible date to make a report on the situation. The French Ministry of Europe and Foreign Affairs issued a statement on 27 November:

The French authorities are examining very carefully all of the testimonies and documents disseminated by the press over the past several days, indicating the existence of a system of internment camps in Xinjiang and a widespread policy of repression in this region. As we have publicly indicated on several occasions, as have our European partners, notably at the UN, within the framework of the most recent UN Human Rights Council sessions, we call on the Chinese authorities to put an end to mass arbitrary detentions in camps and to invite the Office of the United Nations High Commissioner for Human Rights to visit Xinjiang as soon possible to assess the situation in this region.

In December 2020, France said that it would oppose the proposed Comprehensive Agreement on Investment between China and the European Union over the use of forced labour of Uyghurs. In February 2021, the French Foreign Minister Jean-Yves Le Drian denounced "institutionalised repression" of Uyghurs at the UNHRC. French parliament in January 2022 denounced a "genocide" by China against its Uyghur Muslim population in a resolution.

In 2023, French President Emmanuel Macron was criticized for his reluctance to criticize the persecution of Uyghurs in China.

==== Finland ====
In March 2021 Finland's Prime Minister Sanna Marin tweeted a condemnation of the human rights situation in Xinjiang.

==== Lithuania ====
In May 2021, the Lithuanian Parliament passed a resolution recognizing that the Chinese government's human rights abuses against the Uyghurs constitute genocide.

==== Netherlands ====
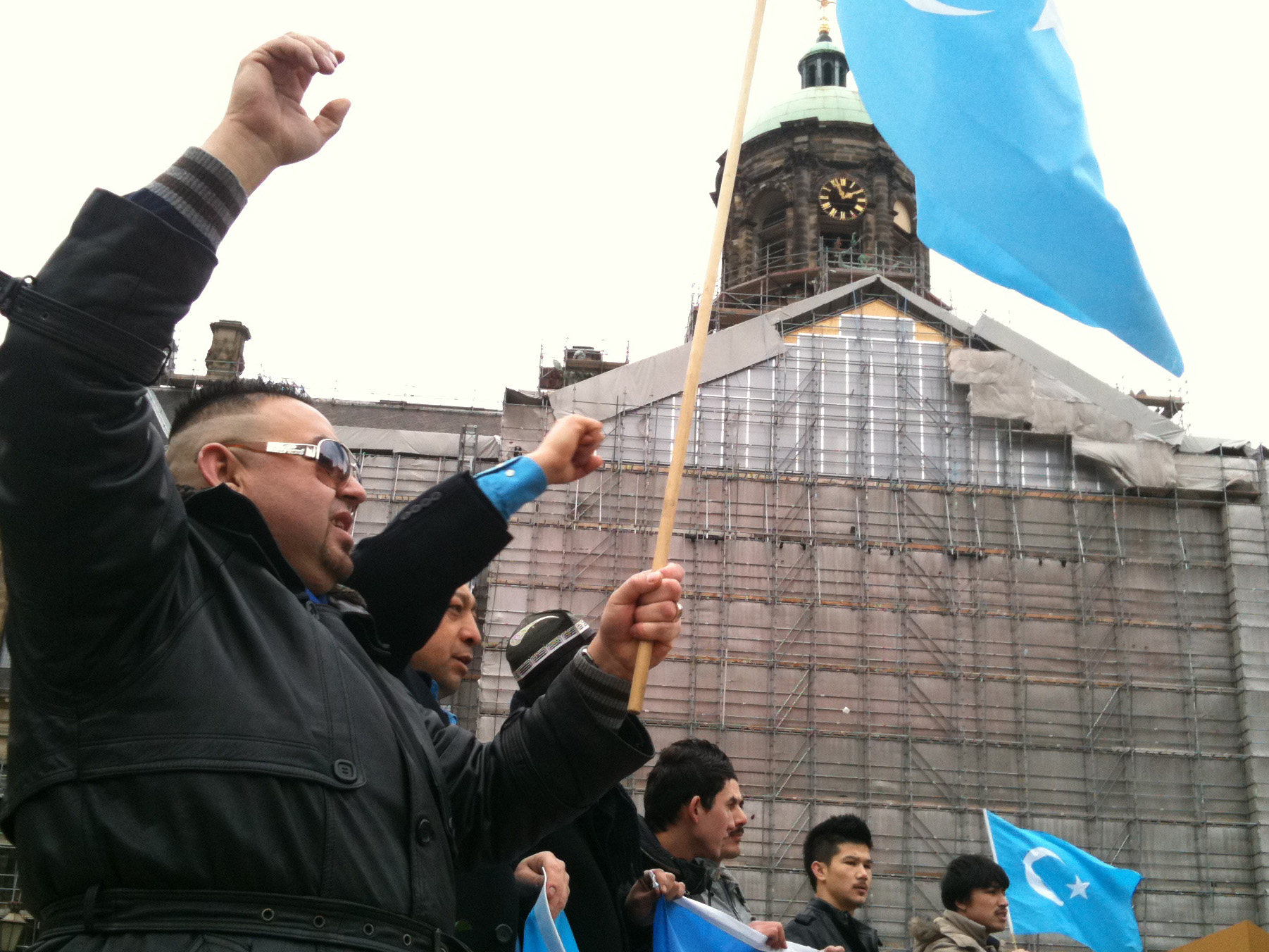
Pro-Uyghur protest in Amsterdam, The Netherlands on 5 February 2011

On 25 February 2021, the Netherlands parliament passed a non-binding resolution declaring the Chinese government's actions against the Uyghurs as a genocide, the third country to do so.

==== Switzerland ====
On 6 November 2018 during the UN Human Rights Council's Universal Periodic Review of China, Switzerland called on China to close down its detention camps in Xinjiang, to grant the UN High Commissioner for Human Rights unrestricted access to Xinjiang, and to allow an independent UN investigation of the detention camps.

On 26 November 2019, the Federal Department of Foreign Affairs called on the Chinese government to address the concerns raised by many states and to allow the UN unhindered access to the region.

==== Turkey ====
In February 2019, after Turkish media had picked up rumors of Uyghur musician Abdurehim Heyit dying in detention, the Spokesperson for the Turkish Foreign Ministry denounced China for "violating the fundamental human rights of Uyghur Turks and other Muslim communities in the Xinjiang Uygur Autonomous Region." The spokesperson also called China's repression of its Uyghur minority a "great shame for humanity" and said "more than one million Uyghur Turks incurring arbitrary arrests are subjected to torture and political brainwashing in internment camps and prisons". In July 2019, Turkish journalists from Milliyet and Aydınlık interviewed Heyit in Ürümqi who denied that Uyghurs had problems in China and that he was tortured.

In July 2019, Chinese state media reported that when Turkish President Erdoğan visited China, he said, "It is a fact that the people of all ethnicities in Xinjiang are leading a happy life amid China's development and prosperity." Turkish officials then claimed the paraphrase was mistranslated by the Turkish side, saying it should rather have read "hopes the peoples of China's Xinjiang live happily in peace and prosperity". Erdoğan also said that some people were seeking to "abuse" the Xinjiang crisis to jeopardize the "Turkish–Chinese relationship". Some Uyghurs in Turkey have expressed concerns that they may face deportation back to China.

In February 2021, authorities arrested Uyghur protesters in Ankara following a complaint by the embassy of China in Turkey. In March 2021, the Turkish parliament rejected a motion to call the Chinese government's treatment of Uyghurs a genocide.

On 13 July 2021, President Erdogan told Chinese President Xi Jinping in a phone call that it was important to Turkey that "Uyghur Turks live in prosperity and peace as equal citizens of China" but that Turkey respected China's territorial integrity and sovereignty.

In 2022, Turkey issued a joint statement with 49 UN member states condemning the Chinese government's persecution of Uyghurs and other Turkic Muslims in Xinjiang.

==== Ukraine ====
Ukraine had originally signed onto a 22 June 2021 statement to the UNHRC which called for independent observers to be provided immediate access to Xinjiang, but withdrew its signature two days later. Ukrainian lawmakers later stated that China had forced the policy pivot by threatening to limit trade and block a scheduled shipment of at least 500,000 COVID-19 vaccine doses.

==== United Kingdom ====
On 3 July 2018, at a U.K. Parliamentary roundtable, the Rights Practice helped to organize a Parliamentary Round-table on increased repression and forced assimilation in Xinjiang. Rahima Mahmut, an Uyghur singer and human rights activist, gave a personal testimony about the violations suffered by the Uyghur community. Dr. Adrian Zenz, European School of Culture and Theology, (Germany), outlined the evidence of a large scale and sophisticated political re-education network designed to detain people for long periods and which the Chinese government officially denies.

On 10 October 2020, Britain's Shadow Foreign Secretary, Lisa Nandy suggested that Britain must oppose giving China a seat on the UNHRC in protest against its abuse of Uyghur Muslims. She added that the UN must be allowed to conduct an inquiry into possible crimes against humanity in Xinjiang.

A letter was signed in September 2020 by more than 120 MPs and peers, including senior Tories and Liberal Democrat leader Sir Ed Davey, which accused China of a "systematic and calculated programme of ethnic cleansing" against the country's Uyghur minority, and compared China to Nazi Germany.

On 16 December 2020, the U.K. said there was credible, growing, and troubling evidence of forced labor among Uyghur Muslims in Xinjiang. Nigel Adams, Minister of State for Asia told Parliament, "Evidence of forced Uyghur labor within Xinjiang, and in other parts of China, is credible, it is growing and deeply troubling to the UK government." Adams said firms had a duty to ensure their supply chains were free of forced labor.

In January 2021, the British parliament rejected a resolution which would have banned the UK from trading with countries engaged in genocides. Prime Minister Boris Johnson opposed the resolution.

On 12 January 2021, foreign secretary Dominic Raab made a statement over China's human rights violations against Uyghurs, accusing China of "extensive and invasive surveillance targeting minorities, systematic restrictions on Uyghur culture, education, and the practice of Islam, and the widespread use of forced labour." He also announced if British businesses fail to ensure their supply chains are free of slave labour could face fines. Raab appeared to be targeting China's mistreatment of internees in Xinjiang, saying it was Britain's "moral duty" to respond to the "far-reaching" evidence of human rights abuses being perpetrated in Xinjiang.

In January 2021, The Guardian reported that the UK government "fended off an all-party effort to give the courts a chance to designate China guilty of genocide on the day that Blinken said China was intent on genocide in Xinjiang province."

In March 2021, the UK and the EU sanctioned four Chinese officials, including Zhu Hailun and Wang Junzheng, for their involvement in violating the human rights of Uyghur Muslims in Xinjiang. In response, China imposed sanctions on nine UK citizens for spreading "lies and disinformation" about human rights abuses in Xinjiang.

On 23 April, a group of MPs led by Sir Iain Duncan Smith passed a motion declaring the mass detention of Uyghur Muslims in Xinjiang province a genocide. The United Kingdom is the fourth country in the world to make such action. In response, the Chinese Embassy in London said "The unwarranted accusation by a handful of British MPs that there is 'genocide' in Xinjiang is the most preposterous lie of the century..."

=== Oceania ===
==== Australia ====
In September 2019, Australian Foreign Minister Marise Payne stated, "I have previously raised Australia's concerns about reports of mass detentions of Uyghurs and other Muslim peoples in Xinjiang. We have consistently called for China to cease the arbitrary detention of Uyghurs and other Muslim groups. We have raised these concerns—and we will continue to raise them—both bilaterally and in relevant international meetings." In March 2021, the federal government blocked a motion by Rex Patrick to recognize China's treatment of the Uyghurs as a genocide.

==== New Zealand ====
In 2017, National MP Todd McClay represented his party in Beijing before a dialogue organised by the International Liaison Department of the Chinese Communist Party. McClay also referred to the Xinjiang internment camps as "vocational training centers" in line with CCP talking points.

In 2018, New Zealand prime minister Jacinda Ardern raised the issue of Xinjiang while visiting Guangdong Party Secretary Leader Li Xi. Ardern also raised such concerns during China's periodic review at the UN in November 2018, to immediate pushback from China.

Ardern discussed Xinjiang privately with Xi Jinping during a 2019 visit to Beijing after the Christchurch mosque shootings. The New York Times accused New Zealand of tiptoeing around the issue for economic reasons as the country exports many products to China, including milk, meat, and wine.

On 5 May 2021, the New Zealand Parliament adopted a motion declaring that "severe human rights abuses" were occurring against the Uyghur people in Xinjiang. An earlier version of the motion proposed by the opposition ACT Party had accused the Chinese Government of committing genocide against the Uyghurs. The ruling Labour Party had opposed including the word "genocide" in the motion, leading to an amended version criticising "severe human rights abuses."

New Zealand Prime Minister Jacinda Ardern has raised the issue of the Uyghurs on numerous occasions, including in her 2019 meeting with CCP General Secretary Xi Jinping. She did not detail exactly what was said. In July 2019, New Zealand Foreign Minister Winston Peters, asked why New Zealand had signed the letter to the president of the United Nations Human Rights Council criticizing Beijing for its treatment of ethnic Uyghurs in the Xinjiang region stated, "Because we believe in human rights, we believe in freedom and we believe in the liberty of personal beliefs and the right to hold them."

== Other reactions ==
=== Multinational corporations ===
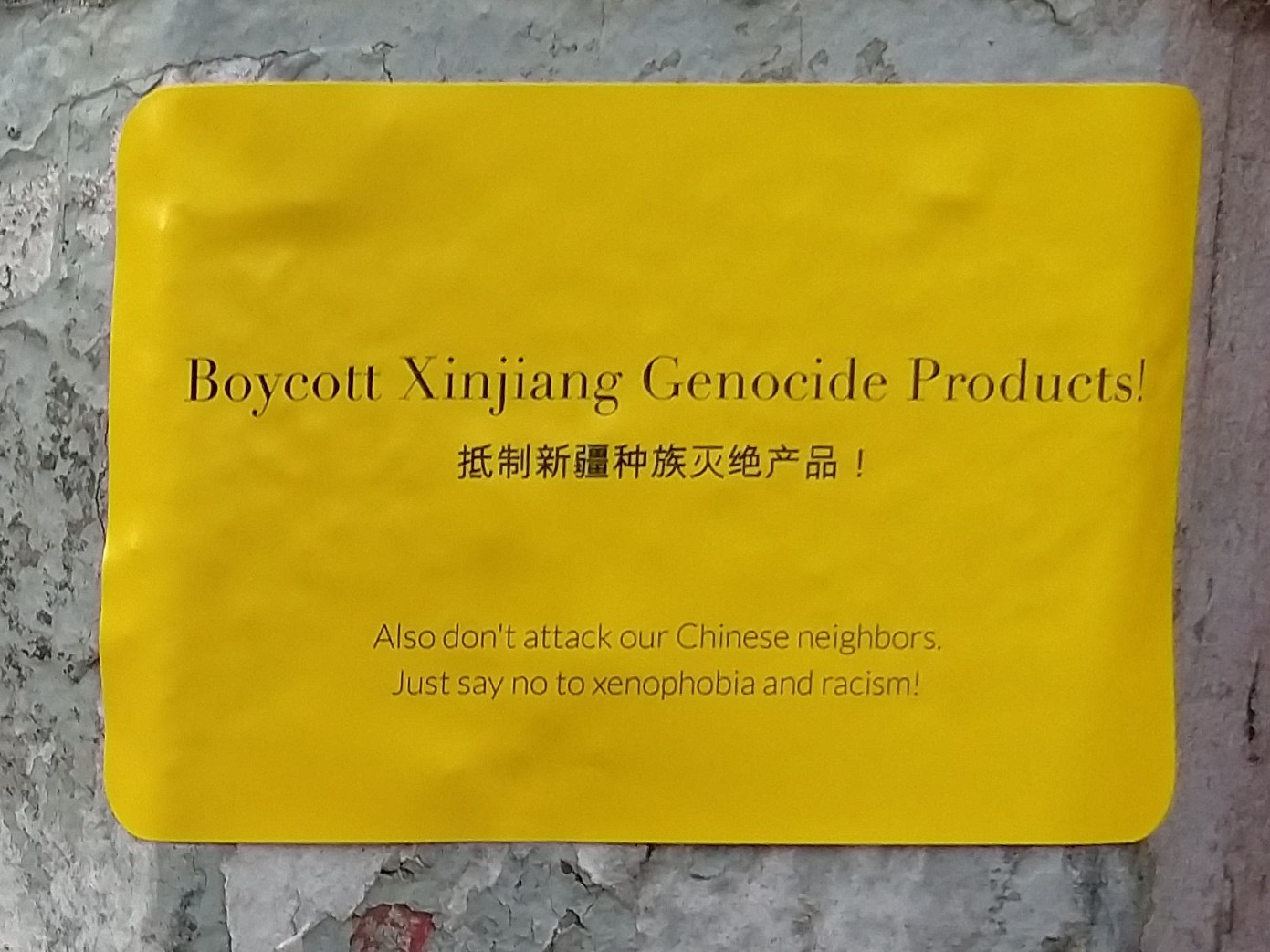
Xinjiang boycott advert on NYU's campus in New York, NY "Boycott Xinjiang Genocide Products!"

In the U.S., in reaction to the proposed Uyghur Forced Labor Prevention Act in 2020 to impose sanctions on "any foreign person who 'knowingly engages'" and require firms to disclose their dealings with Xinjiang, the president of the American Apparel & Footwear Association said that blanket import bans on cotton or other products from Xinjiang from such legislation would "wreak havoc" on legitimate supply chains in the apparel industry because Xinjiang cotton exports are often intermingled with cotton from other countries and there is no available origin-tracing technology for cotton fibers. On 22 September 2020, the US Chamber of Commerce issued a letter stating that the act "would prove ineffective and may hinder efforts to prevent human rights abuses." Major companies with supply chain ties to Xinjiang, including Apple Inc., Nike, Inc. and The Coca-Cola Company, have lobbied Congress to weaken the legislation and amend its provisions.

In February 2021, a policy was established by 12 Japanese companies to cease business deals with some of the Chinese firms involved in or benefitting from forced labor of Uyghurs in Xinjiang.

Both Nike and Adidas have criticized human rights abuses in Xinjiang and pledged not to do business in the region; their sales in China subsequently declined. After a December 2022 report stated that nearly every global automaker had ties to Uyghur forced labor, United Auto Workers called for all automakers to cut off any supply chain links to Xinjiang.

=== Religious groups ===
On 7 January 2020, CAIR National Executive Director Nihad Awad condemned a tweet by the US Chinese embassy, saying that China was openly admitting to and celebrating forced sterilizations and abortions of Muslim Uyghur women by saying it had "emancipated" them from being "baby-making machines".

In July 2020, Marie van der Zyl, the President of the Board of Deputies of British Jews, pointed to similarities between the mass detention of Uyghur Muslims and concentration camps in the Holocaust. On International Holocaust Remembrance Day in January 2021, van der Zyl urged the Chinese government to step back from committing atrocities.

In December 2020, the Chief Rabbi of the United Hebrew Congregations of the Commonwealth Ephraim Mirvis published an op-ed in The Guardian on the occasion of Hanukkah in which he condemned the persecution of the Uyghurs and called for international action to address the "unfathomable mass atrocity" taking place in China. The Chief Rabbi generally refrains from making comments on non-Jewish political issues. Mirvis is part of a wider Jewish protest movement which has sprung up in opposition to the human rights abuses in Xinjiang, protesters are largely motivated by memories of the Holocaust and a desire to prevent a repeat of that horror. In addition to liberal British Jews who have long been involved in international human rights issue the plight of the Uyghur also draws significant interest and support from Britain's Orthodox community. According to Orthodox Rabbi Herschel Gluck "This is something that is felt very deeply by the community. They feel that if 'Never again' is a term that needs to be used, this is certainly one of the situations where it applies."

In December 2020, a coalition of American Muslim groups criticized the Organisation of Islamic Cooperation for failing to speak up to prevent the abuse of the Uyghurs and accused member states of being "cowed by China's power". The groups included the Council on American–Islamic Relations (CAIR).

In August 2020, a group of 70 British faith leaders including imams, rabbis, bishops, cardinals, and an archbishop publicly declared that the Uyghurs faced "one of the most egregious human tragedies since the Holocaust" and called for those responsible to be held accountable. The group included the representative of the Dalai Lama in Europe and Rowan Williams, former Archbishop of Canterbury.

In March 2021, a group of sixteen Rabbis and a Cantor from across California's Jewish religious spectrum sent a letter to Representative Ted Lieu urging him to take action in support of the Uyghurs. The grassroots organization Jewish Movement for Uyghur Freedom works to bridge the gap between the Uyghur and Jewish communities as well as advocate on their behalf. In contrast to the earlier Save Darfur campaign major Jewish donors and organizations have tread softly due to a fear of reprisals against themselves and associated businesses by the Chinese government. Major Jewish groups which have spoken out on the Uyghur genocide or taken policy positions on it include the Union for Reform Judaism, the American Jewish Committee, the Rabbinical Assembly, the Anti-Defamation League, and the Conference of Presidents of Major American Jewish Organizations.

In April 2021, the Jewish Council for Public Affairs, a U.S-based public policy group composed of organizations representing Reconstructionist, Reform, Conservative, and Orthodox Jews, urged the Jewish community to "call upon the [Chinese Communist Party] to end the genocide and exploitation of the Uyghurs, as well as halt the oppression of other ethnic and religious minorities living within its borders."

In 2021, a number of Jewish organizations and leaders in the United Kingdom including rabbi Jonathan Wittenberg incorporated the situation in Xinjiang into their Holocaust Memorial Day remembrances and commemorations.

In December 2021, the Council on American–Islamic Relations (CAIR) welcomed Biden's decision to sign the Uyghur Forced Labor Prevention Act.

In December 2021, a coalition of Jewish organizations, including the American Jewish Committee and the Rabbinical Assembly, issued an open letter titled "Open Letter from the Jewish Community to President Biden on the Uyghur Genocide" to President Joe Biden urging additional action in response to abuses against Uyghurs including countering propaganda, strengthening sanctions, and increasing the amount of Uyghur refugees admitted to the US.

In January 2022, Jewish American activist Elisha Wiesel criticised China and expressed support for Uyghur dissidents in a speech at a UN-held ceremony to mark International Holocaust Remembrance Day. His speech drew praise from Uyghur Human Rights Project director Omer Kanat.

On 8 January 2023, World Bosniak Congress President and former Grand Mufti of Bosnia Mustafa Ceric toured Xinjiang along with a delegation of more than 30 Islamic scholars from 14 countries as part of a Chinese government-organized visit, where he praised "the Chinese policy of fighting terrorism and de-radicalization for achieving peace and harmony" in the region, adding he was glad to see that Muslims there live in happiness. Mustafa Prljaca, adviser to Bosnia's current Grand Mufti Husein Kavazovic, told Radio Free Europe that his office did not agree with Ceric's statements, saying: "We have different views, based on the information that we have."

In April 2023, the California chapter of the Council on American-Islamic Relations (CAIR-CA) expressed strong support for the California Assembly resolution introduced by Jesse Gabriel condemning the human rights abuses in Xinjiang and supporting the Uyghur Forced Labor Prevention Act.

=== Other organizations ===
On 10 September 2017, Human Rights Watch released a report that said "The Chinese government should immediately free people held in unlawful 'political education' centers in Xinjiang and shut them down."

On 9 September 2018, Human Rights Watch released a 117-page report, "'Eradicating Ideological Viruses': China's Campaign of Repression Against Xinjiang's Muslims", which accused China of the systematic mass detention of tens of thousands of ethnic Uyghurs and other Muslims in political re-education camps without being charged or tried and presented new evidence of the Chinese government's mass arbitrary detention, torture, and mistreatment, and the increasingly pervasive controls on daily life. The report also urged foreign governments to pursue a range of multilateral and unilateral actions against China for its actions, including "targeted sanctions" against those responsible.

In January 2020, President Ghulam Osman Yaghma of the East Turkistan Government-in-Exile wrote that "the world is silently witnessing another Holocaust like genocide in East Turkistan....as the President of East Turkistan Government-in-Exile, on behalf of East Turkistan and its people, we again call on the international community including world governments to acknowledge and recognize China's brutal Holocaust like the oppression of East Turkistan's people as a genocide."

The Uyghur American Association previously expressed concern at the deportation of 20 Uyghur refugees from Cambodia to China in 2009, and has said that Beijing's military approach to terrorism in Xinjiang is state terrorism. The United States Holocaust Memorial Museum has issued statements describing the conditions in Xinjiang as crimes against humanity. According to the United States Holocaust Memorial Museum, "the Chinese government's campaign against the Uyghurs in Xinjiang is multi-faceted and systematic. It is characterized by mass detention, forced labor, and discriminatory laws, and supported through high-tech manners of surveillance."

As of July 2020, Amnesty International had not taken a position on whether the Chinese government's treatment of Uyghurs constituted a genocide. In June 2021, Amnesty released a report saying that China's treatment of Uyghurs constituted crimes against humanity. Genocide Watch "considers the forced sterilizations and forcible transfer of children of Uyghurs and other Turkic minorities in Xinjiang to be acts of genocide" and subsequently issued a Genocide Emergency Alert in November 2020.

In September 2020, nearly two dozen activist groups, including the Uyghur Human Rights Project, Genocide Watch, and the European Centre for the Responsibility to Protect, signed an open letter urging the UNHRC to investigate whether crimes against humanity or genocide were taking place in Xinjiang.

Amnesty International published a dedicated website and an extensive report in 2021. Amnesty estimates up to 1 million prisoners and concludes "The evidence Amnesty International has gathered provides a factual basis for the conclusion that the Chinese government has committed at least the following crimes against humanity: imprisonment or other severe deprivation of physical liberty in violation of fundamental rules of international law; torture; and persecution." Their full report includes recommendations to the Chinese government, the UN and the international community in general.

In March 2021, the New Lines Institute for Strategy and Policy, a think tank formerly at the Fairfax University of America, released a report stating that the "People's Republic of China bears State responsibility for committing genocide against the Uyghurs in breach of the 1948 Convention on the Prevention and Punishment of the Crime of Genocide." According to the report, the determination of the "intent to destroy the Uyghurs as a group is derived from objective proof, consisting of comprehensive state policy and practice, which President Xi Jinping, the highest authority in China, set in motion." The legal analysis of the New Lines Institute concludes that the People's Republic of China is responsible for breaches of each provision of Article II of the Genocide Convention.

Human Rights Watch followed in April 2021 with a report outlining "that the Chinese government has committed—and continues to commit—crimes against humanity against the Turkic Muslim population." The report stated that Human Rights Watch had "not documented the existence of the necessary genocidal intent at [the] time", but that "nothing in this report precludes such a finding and, if such evidence were to emerge, the acts being committed against Turkic Muslims in Xinjiang—a group protected by the 1948 Genocide Convention—could also support a finding of genocide". The report made in collaboration with the Stanford Human Rights & Conflict Resolution Clinic also sets out recommendations for concerned governments and the UN.

The Uyghur Tribunal, a "people's tribunal" based in the United Kingdom, began to hold hearings in June 2021 to examine evidence in order to evaluate whether China's abuses against Uyghurs constitute genocide under the Genocide Convention. The tribunal was chaired by Geoffrey Nice, the lead prosecutor in the trial of Slobodan Milošević, who announced the creation of the tribunal in September 2020.

On 9 December 2021, the tribunal concluded that China has committed genocide against the Uyghurs via birth control and sterilization measures. The tribunal also found evidence of crimes against humanity, torture and sexual abuse. The tribunal's final determination does not legally bind any government to take action.

=== Protests ===
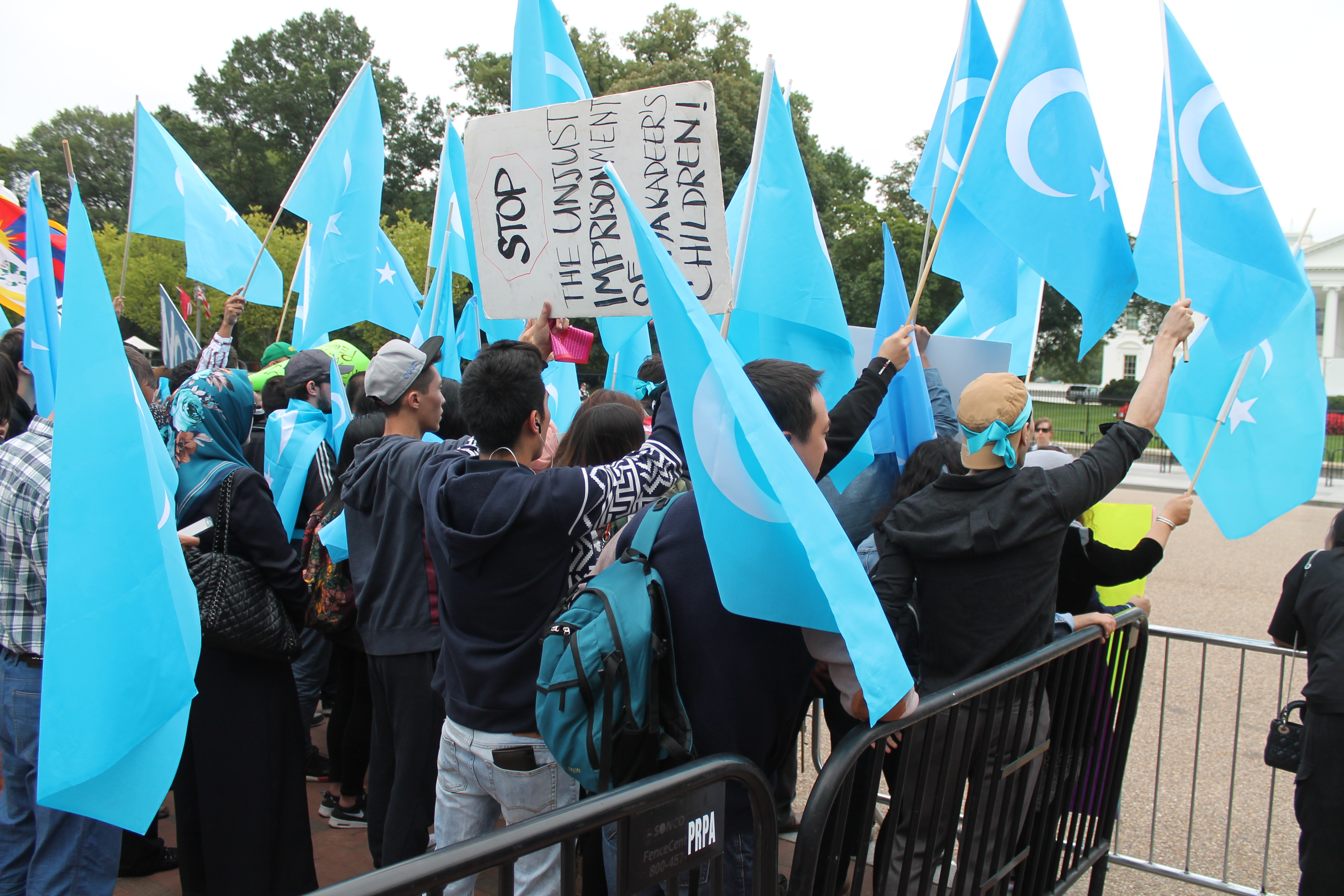
Uyghur human rights demonstration protest near the White House, on 25 September 2015

The Chinese Consulate in Almaty, Kazakhstan has been the site of a daily protest demonstration, primarily made up of old women whose relatives are believed to be detained in China. In 2020 Uyghur protesters outside the Consulate General of China, Los Angeles were joined by activists representing Tibet, Taiwan, and Hong Kong.

Regular protests from local Uyghurs have been held at Chinese diplomatic sites in Istanbul, Turkey, where several hundred Uyghur women protested on International Women's Day in March 2021. In London regular protests outside an outpost of the Chinese embassy have been organized by an Orthodox Jewish man from the local neighborhood. He has held protests at least twice a week since February 2019.

In March 2021, hundreds of Uyghurs living in Turkey protested the visit of Chinese Foreign Minister Wang Yi to Istanbul by gathering both in Beyazit Square and near China's Consulate-General in Istanbul. Over two-dozen NGOs that focus on the rights of Uyghurs were involved in organizing the protests.

In October 2021, basketball player Enes Kanter protested against abuses against the Uyghurs by the Chinese state by wearing sneakers on court which said "Modern Day Slavery" and "No More Excuses." He also criticized Nike for being silent on injustices in China. Kanter tweeted "It is so disappointing that the governments and leaders of Muslim-majority countries are staying silent while my Muslim brothers and sisters are getting killed, raped, and tortured."

==== 2022 Winter Olympics Boycott ====
In the aftermath of the 2019 leak of the Xinjiang papers which made public Chinese policies towards the Uyghurs, calls were made for a boycott of the 2022 Winter Olympics. In a 30 July 2020 letter, the World Uyghur Congress urged the International Olympic Committee (IOC) to reconsider the decision to hold the Olympics in Beijing. In a non-binding motion in February 2021, the Canadian House of Commons called for the IOC to move the Olympics to a new location. The IOC met with activists in late 2020 about their request to move the Olympics. In March 2021, the President of the International Olympic Committee Thomas Bach opposed a boycott, which would also damage the IOC image and finances, and said that the IOC must stay out of politics. On 6 April 2021, a senior U.S. State Department official stated that the department's position "on the 2022 Olympics has not changed" and that it has not "discussed and [is] not discussing any joint boycott with allies and partners." Australia, Belgium, Canada, Denmark, India, Kosovo, Lithuania, Taiwan, the United Kingdom, and the United States announced diplomatic boycotts of the 2022 Winter Olympics.

=== Legal cases ===
In July 2020, the East Turkistan National Awakening Movement and the East Turkistan Government in Exile filed a complaint with the International Criminal Court calling for it to investigate PRC officials for crimes committed against Uyghurs, including allegations of genocide. In December 2020, the International Criminal Court declined to take investigative action against China on the basis of not having jurisdiction over China for most of the alleged crimes.

On 4 January 2022, nineteen Uyghurs, with the help of lawyer Gulden Sonmez, filed a criminal case for torture, rape, crimes against humanity and genocide in the Istanbul Prosecutor's Office against Chinese officials. Sonmez stated that Turkish legislation recognises universal jurisdiction for the offences alleged in the case.

=== Publications ===
Nury Turkel published the book No Escape: The True Story of China's Genocide of the Uyghurs in 2022, which documented his personal story on the repression of Uyghurs in Xinjiang.
