= Abdul El-Sayed =

American epidemiologist and politician (born 1984)

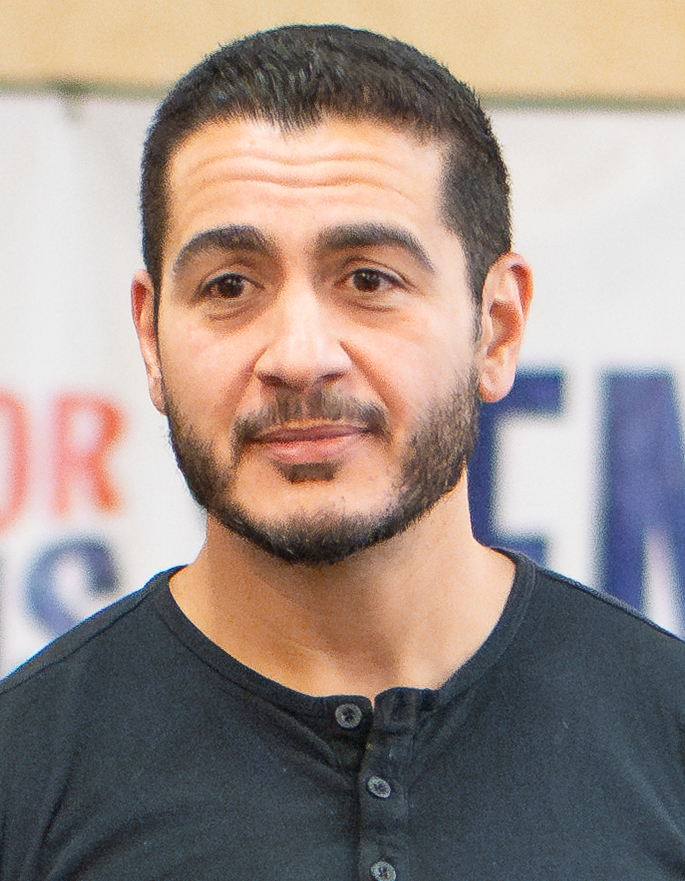
- El-Sayed in 2025

United States Senator-elect from Michigan
- Assuming office January 3, 2027
- Succeeding: Gary Peters

Personal details
- Born: Abdulrahman Mohamed El-Sayed; October 31, 1984 (age 42) Rochester Hills, Michigan, U.S.
- Party: Democratic
- Spouse: Sarah Jukaku (m. 2006)
- Children: 2
- Education: University of Michigan (BS); Oriel College, Oxford (DPhil); Columbia University (MD)
- Website: Campaign website

Abdulrahman Mohamed El-Sayed (/ɛl ˈseɪ.ɪd/ el-SAY-id; born October 31, 1984) is an American politician, epidemiologist, and academic who is the United States senator-elect from Michigan. A member of the Democratic Party, El-Sayed was the executive director of the Detroit Health Department from 2015 to 2017, and was director of the Wayne County Department of Health, Human, and Veterans Services from 2023 to 2025.

Born and raised in southeast Michigan, El-Sayed graduated from the University of Michigan and was a Rhodes Scholar at the University of Oxford, where he earned a doctorate in public health. He then earned his medical degree from Columbia University and became an assistant professor of epidemiology at the Columbia University Mailman School of Public Health.

A progressive Democrat, El-Sayed narrowly defeated U.S. representative Haley Stevens in the 2026 Michigan Democratic Senate primary. He defeated Republican nominee Mike Rogers in the general election, becoming the first Muslim American elected to the United States Senate.

== Early life, family, and education ==
Abdulrahman Mohamed El-Sayed was born on October 31, 1984, in Rochester Hills, Michigan, a suburb of Detroit, to Egyptian immigrant parents. He was raised in southeast Michigan. His father, Mohamed El-Sayed, was raised in Alexandria, Egypt, and immigrated to the United States to pursue a PhD at Wayne State University. According to El-Sayed, his father's "political agitation against Egypt's increasingly brutal military dictatorship" under Anwar Sadat prompted his move to the U.S. His mother, Fatten El-Komy, is a nurse practitioner in Missouri. His parents divorced when he was three years old. He was subsequently raised in the Detroit area by his father and stepmother, Jacqueline El-Sayed (née Johnson), a native of Gratiot County, Michigan. Both his father and stepmother are mechanical engineers, and his father was a professor of mechanical engineering at Kettering University in Flint and also an imam.

In 2003, El-Sayed graduated from Bloomfield Hills Andover High School, where he was a three-sport athlete and captain of the wrestling, football, and lacrosse teams. He then attended the University of Michigan, majoring in biology and political science and playing on the men's club lacrosse team. He graduated Phi Beta Kappa with highest distinction in 2007 with a bachelor's degree and gave that year's student commencement speech. After the ceremony, former U.S. president and fellow Rhodes Scholar Bill Clinton (who gave the keynote speech) encouraged him to consider public service.

El-Sayed received a full-tuition scholarship to the University of Michigan Medical School, where he completed the first two years of a combined MD-PhD program and initially considered becoming a neurosurgeon. While there, he led a student medical mission to Peru and founded a student organization that raised money and coordinated community service for a local free clinic. He later wrote in his Rhodes Scholarship application, "My religion teaches that if one saves a life, she has saved all of humanity", recounting a childhood conversation with his father about the importance of saving lives while teaching others to do the same.

As a second-year medical student, El-Sayed received a Rhodes Scholarship to attend Oriel College, Oxford, where he completed a Doctor of Philosophy in public health in 2011. His doctoral thesis was titled "Inequalities in obesity in England: an agent-based systems approach" and supervised by Peter Scarborough and Michael Goldacre. At Oxford, he earned a full blue as captain of the men's lacrosse team. In 2014, he completed a Doctor of Medicine degree at the Columbia University College of Physicians and Surgeons, supported by a Paul & Daisy Soros Fellowships for New Americans and the Medical Scientist Training Program.

He later worked as an assistant professor of epidemiology at Columbia but did not pursue residency training, and therefore did not become licensed to practice medicine. He has described himself as a physician, including on his LinkedIn profile. During the 2026 campaign, Rogers' campaign said the description was misleading, since Michigan and federal law tie the term to licensure; El-Sayed's campaign has pointed to the American Medical Association's definition, which includes anyone with a medical degree.

== Career in public health ==
=== Public health professor ===
In 2014, El-Sayed joined the faculty at the Columbia University Mailman School of Public Health as an assistant professor in the epidemiology department. He served as director of Columbia's Systems Science Program and Global Research Analytics for Population Health. He created and taught the Mailman School's first course on systems science and population health. El-Sayed and Sandro Galea co-edited a textbook on the topic, Systems Science and Population Health, published in 2017 by Oxford University Press.

=== Health director of Detroit ===
In August 2015, Mayor Mike Duggan appointed El-Sayed Health Officer and Executive Director of the Detroit Health Department, making him, at 30 years old, the youngest health officer in a major U.S. city at the time. In that role, he was charged with rebuilding the Detroit Health Department after government public health activities were provided by a nonprofit when the city went bankrupt in 2013.

In his first year as director, he led efforts to oppose increases in sulfur dioxide emissions by Marathon Petroleum's Southwest Refinery, which resulted in reductions in overall emissions. He also led efforts to test Detroit schools for lead in the wake of the Flint water crisis and to increase funding for the city's Animal Control department.

El-Sayed was appointed to the governor's statewide Childhood Lead Elimination Board. He also served on the State of Michigan's Public Health Advisory Commission and the advisory committee to the US Secretary of Health and Human Services for the Healthy People program.

In 2016, El-Sayed was named one of Crain's Detroit's "40 under 40" and the Michigan League of Conservation Voters' "Public Official of the Year". In 2017, the University of Michigan awarded him a Bicentennial Alumni Award.

Since 2019, El-Sayed has hosted America Dissected with Dr. Abdul El-Sayed, a podcast about politics and public health produced by Crooked Media.

=== Health director of Wayne County ===
El-Sayed testifying before the U.S. Senate Committee on Health, Education, Labor and Pensions, 2024

In December 2022, El-Sayed was named director of Wayne County's Department of Health, Human, and Veterans Services, assuming the role in March 2023.

During his tenure, El-Sayed oversaw the installation of air quality monitors across Wayne County to identify pollution hotspots and launched a program to buy and erase up to $700 million in medical debt for about 300,000 county residents. As of September 2026, the program had erased about $95 million in debt for more than 100,000 residents. A Bridge Michigan fact-check found that El-Sayed's Senate campaign had overstated the program's results by saying he had erased $700 million, the program's stated goal. He helped the county restructure the Juvenile Youth Services and relocate the Criminal Justice Complex, and started a program for the county to provide eyeglasses to children in lower-income schools.

In April 2025, El-Sayed resigned to run for the U.S. Senate.

== Early political activities ==
El-Sayed's campaign logo in 2018

On February 9, 2017, The Detroit News reported that El-Sayed would resign as health director to run for governor of Michigan in the 2018 Democratic Party primary. He officially announced his candidacy on February 25, 2017, saying he was inspired to run for governor after the Flint water crisis.

El-Sayed pledged to accept no campaign donations from corporations, and raised over $5 million from individual donations.

In early 2018, El-Sayed's eligibility to run was questioned because he had been registered to vote in New York as recently as 2015; the Michigan Constitution requires a candidate for governor to have been a qualified elector of the state for four years before the election. At the request of the Michigan Democratic Party, he asked a court to rule on the question. In May 2018, the Michigan Bureau of Elections rejected the challenges to his candidacy, noting that he had been registered to vote in Michigan for 15 consecutive years.

During the campaign, El-Sayed said that Detroit's housing demolition program had been "poisoning kids with lead" and that Duggan had ignored his warnings while he was health director. Duggan's office responded, "Dr. El-Sayed's story about his time at the city has changed, and irresponsibly so", and released emails that it said showed El-Sayed praising the city's demolition team. El-Sayed's campaign disputed the mayor's account.

El-Sayed was endorsed by U.S. senator Bernie Sanders, Democratic congressional nominee Alexandria Ocasio-Cortez, and 2017 Women's March organizer Linda Sarsour. He was also endorsed by the organization Justice Democrats and The Nation magazine. In the August 7 primary, he received 340,560 votes, or about 30% of the vote, losing to Gretchen Whitmer.

In September 2018, El-Sayed founded Southpaw Michigan, a political action committee, to help elect progressive candidates and support ballot initiatives in Michigan. In 2020, he served on the Joe Biden–Bernie Sanders Unity Task Force on healthcare.

In the 2024 Michigan Democratic presidential primary, El-Sayed and 100,000 other voters cast "uncommitted" ballots in protest of President Joe Biden's handling of the Gaza war; he said at the time that the protest applied only to the primary. During the 2026 Senate primary, Haley Stevens's campaign questioned his commitment to the Democratic Party and accused him of leading the uncommitted movement, which Bridge Michigan found he had not done.

== U.S. Senate ==
El-Sayed at a campaign event at Michigan Technological University in 2025

=== 2026 election ===
==== Primary election ====
In April 2025, after incumbent Gary Peters announced he would not run for reelection, El-Sayed launched his campaign in the 2026 United States Senate election in Michigan.

In April 2026, left-wing political commentator Hasan Piker appeared with El-Sayed at two campus rallies and a primary-night party in Detroit. Centrist Democrats and El-Sayed's primary opponents criticized Piker's participation over his past comments, such as his support for Hamas over Israel and belief that America deserved 9/11. El-Sayed defended his appearances with Piker as an effort to engage with his audience and said he does not agree with everything Piker has said, and later specifically condemned Piker's comments about 9/11 as "dumb".

After Michigan state Senator Mallory McMorrow withdrew from the Democratic primary in July, news outlets called the race a choice between the party's moderate, establishment-backed wing, represented by Haley Stevens, and its progressive wing, represented by El-Sayed. Outside spending became a significant feature of the contest, with about $62 million spent by outside groups in support of Stevens, of which the American Israel Public Affairs Committee (AIPAC) and its United Democracy Project affiliate spent $33 million.

On August 4, the day of the primary, as results showed El-Sayed roughly two points ahead of Stevens, McMorrow endorsed El-Sayed. On August 5, the Associated Press called the race for El-Sayed, who finished with 48.4% to Stevens's 47.6%. He faced Republican nominee Mike Rogers in the general election on November 3, 2026.

==== General election ====
El-Sayed's campaign logo in 2026

El-Sayed's primary victory yielded a wave of anti-Muslim rhetoric. In September, without evidence, Mike Rogers said El-Sayed had "pledged support" to the Muslim Brotherhood and his campaign was funded by Muslim "terrorist groups". Fact-checkers found no evidence for either claim, but Rogers did not retract them. Vice President JD Vance falsely claimed that El-Sayed supports "sharia law". Senator John Kennedy said El-Sayed "sleep[s] in a bin Laden jersey". While campaigning for Rogers, President Donald Trump has repeatedly called El-Sayed "Mohammed"; a "jihadist"; and a "terrorist sympathizer". In response, El-Sayed said Trump "thinks he can use my name and my faith to distract us from the suffering his policies are inflicting on us", and asked "Can you afford your gas? Can you afford your groceries?"

After El-Sayed won the primary, AIPAC initially planned to spend millions more in favor of Rogers in the general election, but chose not to spend for Rogers until October. In October, AIPAC started spending money on the race with a $95,000 purchase of mailers.

In August 2026, El-Sayed apologized for remarks he made after the 2026 Temple Israel attack in West Bloomfield Township, Michigan. After that attack, El-Sayed released a video statement that included the phrase "Hurt people hurt people", a reference to the perpetrator's relatives having been killed in an Israeli airstrike. In his apology, El-Sayed said, "I should have just issued a statement, of course condemning it, and it should have been the full stop." El-Sayed pledged to protect Michigan's Jewish communities from hatred and discrimination.

Also in August 2026, El-Sayed said he had no plans to campaign with Piker again. This came after Piker said during a Twitch stream that if pro-Israel Jewish leaders continue to conflate Judaism and Jewish identity with support for the state of Israel, that could fuel antisemitism and endanger American Jews due to declining public support for and anger toward Israel. In a statement El-Sayed said: "Antisemitism is a scourge, and we need to address it in all its forms. And I stand against any rhetoric that puts the community at risk. [...] While politicians and pundits try to make this race about a Twitch streamer, we're going to be talking about gas, groceries, good schools, and healthcare."

During his midterm rally campaign, Trump continued to attack El-Sayed as a Muslim. Trump said that "to me, he's Mohammed, and he's a radical jihadist" On October 26, Trump called El-Sayed a "jihadist Muslim Brotherhood member" who was "on the side of the terrorists" and should have to "go through a metal detector before he's allowed to go into the Senate". In response to Trump's attacks, El-Sayed said: "No amount of hate, fear, or bigotry can stop our movement to get money out of politics, put money in pockets, and pass Medicare for All". He also said he would be willing to pass through a metal detector if Trump agreed to face a lie detector and answer questions about his alleged ties to Jeffrey Epstein and claims that he won the 2020 presidential election.

On October 24, former president Barack Obama supported El-Sayed at a rally in Detroit. Obama praised El-Sayed's proposals to reduce the influence of money in politics and expand access to health care, and criticized Trump, saying: "Trump is using the presidency to enrich himself and his family." He also condemned efforts to portray candidates as un-American because of their religion or background. On November 2, 2026, American singer Bruce Springsteen announced his support for El-Sayed, calling him a fighter in defense of the U.S. Constitution and democracy against corrupt, anti-American leadership. Kamala Harris endorsed and campaigned with El-Sayed in September.

Once sworn in, El-Sayed will be the first Muslim member of the Senate, and the first Egyptian-American elected to the chamber. (Note: George Helmy was the first Egyptian–American senator, but was appointed and not elected.)

In his November 4 victory speech, El-Sayed reiterated his views on US support for Israel, saying, "We don't want our money to be sent to do apartheid or genocidal war." Attendees at the victory celebration chanted "Free Palestine". Mahmoud Khalil, a Palestinian activist at Columbia University who was detained by the Trump administration, was present at the event.

== Political positions ==
El-Sayed is a progressive and economic populist. He supports Medicare for All and has co-authored a book on the topic. He has vowed not to accept PAC donations, accepting donations from individuals only. He served as a national campaign surrogate for Bernie Sanders's 2020 presidential campaign, speaking on Sanders's behalf at events and in the media. El-Sayed has expressed support for constitutional protections for religious freedom under the First Amendment. During an October 2026 town hall exchange, he defended freedom of religion for all Americans under the Constitution. In June 2026, El-Sayed released a plan calling for more regulation of artificial intelligence and opposed the approval of new data centers until federal safeguards are established. He has called for guarantees that the operation of data centers will not result in rate increases passed on to customers. In 2018, El-Sayed supported repealing Michigan state laws that block local governments from levying a municipal sales tax or enacting rent control laws.

=== Healthcare ===
Medicare for All is part of El-Sayed's policy platform. He supports creating a government-run health insurance system that gives all Americans health insurance. He also supports replacing private insurance with government-funded health coverage.

=== LGBTQ+ rights ===
El-Sayed has expressed comprehensive support for LGBTQ+ rights and their defense, both during his 2018 gubernatorial campaign and his 2026 senatorial campaign.

=== Economy ===
El-Sayed has described himself as a capitalist, saying, "When it comes to the question of socialism, I'm not a socialist. I'm just a capitalist who understands how capitalism works." He supports strengthening enforcement of anti-monopoly laws, eliminating corporate tax breaks, and regulating billionaires to finance public infrastructure.

=== Environment ===
El-Sayed has called for tougher enforcement of environmental laws and for merging Michigan's Department of Natural Resources and the Department of Environmental Quality into a single "Department of the Environment", and achieving 100% renewable energy in Michigan by 2030.

=== Foreign policy ===
El-Sayed generally opposes United States military aid to foreign countries, arguing that American tax dollars should instead be invested domestically. He particularly opposes U.S. military aid to Israel, condemning Israel's genocide in Gaza and its starvation of the population there. El-Sayed extends his opposition to military aid to Egypt, Jordan, and Saudi Arabia as well, but has distinguished U.S. actions during Russia's invasion of Ukraine and in Serbia during the 1990s as examples of beneficial U.S. intervention.

==== China ====
On journalist Chuck Todd's podcast in September 2025, El-Sayed condemned the ongoing persecution of Uyghurs by China, which he called a genocide. He said international governments were reluctant to use the term "genocide" when speaking about the issue because of China's geopolitical power. He said powerful countries must speak out on behalf of persecuted populations.

==== Egypt ====
El-Sayed has criticized the Egyptian government under President Abdel Fattah el-Sisi, calling Egypt a military dictatorship. He has argued that U.S. financial support helped Egypt's military regime remain in power.

==== Iran ====
El-Sayed has attributed the 2026 Iran war to AIPAC's influence in U.S. politics. He called Israel a "rogue state" and said the U.S. should "stop funding the Israeli military unilateral blank checks".

In October 2026, El-Sayed condemned the Iranian government's attacks on democracy and described its actions as horrific. When asked about the killing of protesters in early 2026, he expressed support for democratic movements. He also opposed U.S. military intervention to overthrow the Iranian government.

In October 2026, El-Sayed discussed the war in interviews with Fox News and NBC News. He called the war illegal and said it did not increase American security and had prevented the U.S. from transporting oil and gas through the Strait of Hormuz. El-Sayed also said that Israel had dragged the U.S. into a war aimed at expanding Israel's borders. He said the U.S. had paid $2.8 billion to buy 2,000-pound bombs for a foreign government in September and that he would prefer to spend the money on American schools and infrastructure.

In an interview with CNN, Abdul El-Sayed said Pete Hegseth has mishandled the war with Iran and called Hegseth's handling a failure. He urged Hegseth to resign. His remarks followed a vote by the U.S. House of Representatives, which voted 211–204 to send the impeachment resolution against the Pentagon chief to committee—an action that effectively ended the push.

==== Israel ====
In 2026, El-Sayed was widely described as "a fierce critic of Israel". He has criticized U.S. military funding to Israel, AIPAC, and Israeli influence in U.S. politics. El-Sayed has said that his criticism of Israel should not be conflated with hostility toward Judaism or the Jewish people, whom he "love[s] and revere[s]" based on his experience with Jews in Michigan.

On a January 2024 podcast, El-Sayed called the war in the Gaza Strip a genocide and called for a ceasefire. In a May 2026 Time interview, he asked: "If you can't call it what it is, which is a genocide, then how are you going to stand up to Donald Trump? How are you going to stand up to pharma CEOs?" In April 2026, El-Sayed said in a CNN interview: "Killing tens of thousands of people makes you pretty damn evil. It's not how evil is this one versus that one. Hamas: evil. Israeli government: evil. We can say both."

El-Sayed has said he recognizes Israel's right to exist but has called Israel an ethnostate and said "I don't believe in ethnostates, and I certainly don't believe that our country is responsible to sustain ethnostates." El-Sayed supports "self-determination for Palestinians and Jewish Israelis alike".

==== Russia ====
In March 2022, El-Sayed called the Russo-Ukrainian war "a war between democracy and autocracy, between self-government and fascism", condemning Russian president Vladimir Putin as an "authoritarian dictator".

In April 2025, El-Sayed said that U.S. military aid to Ukraine is different from aid to Israel, as the former was being sent by several multinational organizations. In September 2025, he said that military aid to Ukraine was about "enforcing the rules of the rules-based international order in accordance with our allies".

=== Immigration and Customs Enforcement ===
El-Sayed supports abolishing Immigration and Customs Enforcement (ICE), arguing that it no longer functions as a legitimate law enforcement agency. While he has expressed support for securing the Mexico–United States border and for border law enforcement, he has called ICE "corrupted at its soul".

=== Policing ===
In 2020, after the murder of George Floyd, El-Sayed said in a radio interview: "I believe that we do need to defund the police insofar as defunding the police is disinvesting in the means of incarcerating someone or killing them on the streets and investing more in the means of educating and empowering, engaging communities." He later told The Detroit News that his words were taken out of context and "I actually never, never called for defunding", and his Senate campaign has said he does not support defunding the police; his 2026 platform calls for funding police recruitment, retention, and retirement. FactCheck.org found that some Republican ads exaggerated his record on criminal justice, including a claim that he had called for abolishing prisons.

=== Unionization ===
El-Sayed supports unionization, having been a member of the SEIU, AFT, UAW, and National Writers Union. He has said union expansion is necessary to protect "worker dignity" in response to the growth of AI. He has expressed support for the Protecting the Right to Organize Act alongside unionization efforts among further professions, such as physicians.

== Personal life ==
El-Sayed lives in Ann Arbor with his wife, Sarah Jukaku, whom he married in 2006, and their two daughters. He is a Muslim. El-Sayed claimed to hold dual Egyptian and American citizenship, which his campaign later said was an error. Jukaku, who was born into an Indian immigrant family and whose grandfather was a lawyer, educator, and politician, is a psychiatrist. She was educated at Columbia University.

El-Sayed's father-in-law, Jukaku Tayeb (sometimes cited as Tayeb Jukaku), is an American nephrologist of Indian origin. He was one of two top individual donors to the main PAC supporting El-Sayed's Senate campaign, having given $300,000.

== Bibliography ==
- El-Sayed, Abdulrahman; Galea, Sandro, eds. (2017). Systems Science and Population Health. New York: Oxford University Press. ISBN 978-0-19-049241-0.
- El-Sayed, Abdul (2020). Healing Politics: A Doctor's Journey into the Heart of Our Political Epidemic. New York: Abrams. ISBN 978-1-4197-4302-3.
- El-Sayed, Abdul; Johnson, Micah (2021). Medicare for All: A Citizen's Guide. New York: Oxford University Press. ISBN 978-0-19-005662-9.

== Notes ==
Party political offices
Preceded by Gary Peters	Democratic nominee for U.S. Senator from Michigan (Class 2); 2026	Most recent
U.S. Senate
Preceded by Gary Peters	U.S. Senator (Class 2) from Michigan; Taking office 2027; Served alongside: Elissa Slotkin	Elect
