= ChangeMedEd =

The American Medical Association (AMA) ChangeMedEd Initiative, known as the Accelerating Change in Medical Education Consortium prior to 2023, is a collaborative established to reform and innovate medical education in the United States. Founded by Susan Skochelak in 2013, the consortium is a network of medical schools, residency programs, and organizations dedicated to transforming medical education to reduce barriers to lifelong learning, advance health equity, and improve patient outcomes.

== Background ==
The AMA launched the Accelerating Change in Medical Education Consortium as part of its Accelerating Change in Medical Education Initiative in response to the need for significant changes in undergraduate medical education. Traditional undergraduate medical training methods were seen as inadequate in addressing the rapidly evolving demands of the health care environment, including advancements in medical technology, shifts in patient demographics, and changes in health care delivery systems.

== First cohort of members ==
The first members of the consortium were the 11 medical schools that the AMA awarded $1 million 5-year grants to in 2013. These schools were:

- Brody School of Medicine at East Carolina University
- Indiana University School of Medicine
- Mayo Clinic Alix School of Medicine
- New York University Grossman School of Medicine
- Oregon Health & Science University
- Penn State College of Medicine
- University of California, Davis, School of Medicine
- University of California, San Francisco, School of Medicine
- University of Michigan Medical School
- Vanderbilt University School of Medicine
- Warren Alpert Medical School of Brown University

== Consortium expansion ==
In 2015 the AMA issued another call for grant applications, and in 2016, 21 medical schools received $75,000 three-year grants and joined the Accelerating Change in Medical Education Consortium. The 21 schools joining the consortium in 2016 were:

- A.T. Still University-School of Osteopathic Medicine in Arizona
- Case Western Reserve University School of Medicine
- CUNY School of Medicine
- Dell Medical School at the University of Texas at Austin
- Eastern Virginia Medical School
- Emory University School of Medicine
- Florida International University Herbert Wertheim College of Medicine
- Harvard Medical School
- Michigan State University College of Osteopathic Medicine
- Morehouse School of Medicine
- Ohio University Heritage College of Osteopathic Medicine
- Rutgers Robert Wood Johnson Medical School
- Sidney Kimmel Medical College at Thomas Jefferson University
- University of Chicago Pritzker School of Medicine
- University of Connecticut School of Medicine
- University of Nebraska Medical Center College of Medicine
- University of North Carolina School of Medicine
- University of North Dakota School of Medicine and Health Sciences
- University of Texas Rio Grande Valley School of Medicine
- University of Utah School of Medicine
- University of Washington School of Medicine

== Innovation grants ==
In 2018, the AMA launched the AMA Innovation Grant Program. This program provided one-year grants of $10,000 or $30,000 for medical education institutions developing projects incorporating innovative curricula, assessments, and evaluation techniques. Quite of few of the applicants to and recipients of these grants were at institutions that were already members of the Accelerating Change in Medical Education Consortium. If the grant recipient was at an institution that was not a member of the consortium, the institution was added to the consortium. This led to the consortium growing from 32 schools to 37 schools and adding the following institutions:

- Stanford University School of Medicine
- University of California, Irvine, School of Medicine
- University of Pittsburgh School of Medicine
- University of Southern California Keck School of Medicine
- Virginia Commonwealth University School of Medicine

== Reimagining Residency Initiative ==
In 2019, the AMA announced that it was shifting its focus to innovation in graduate medical education and once again expanding the Accelerating Change in Medical Education Consortium to include representation from entities with oversight of graduate medical education. Eleven projects received $1.8 million 6-year grants to transform residency training to best address workplace needs of our current and future health care system. The Reimagining Residency Projects are:

- Association of Professors of Gynecology and Obstetrics
- Johns Hopkins Hospital, Johns Hopkins Bayview Medical Center, Stanford University, and the University of Alabama at Birmingham
- Maine Medical Center
- Mass General Brigham, Massachusetts General Hospital, and Brigham and Women's Hospital
- Montefiore Health System
- NYU School of Medicine
- Oregon Health & Science University and University of California, Davis
- Pennsylvania State College of Medicine, Kaiser Permanente, Geisinger, Allegheny Health Network
- Stanford University Emergency Medicine Residency Program and the Emergency Medicine Residency Program Evaluation and Assessment Consortium
- University of North Carolina School of Medicine
- Vanderbilt University Medical Center and University of Mississippi Medical Center

== Outputs of the consortium ==
=== Health systems science ===
Health systems science — a foundational platform and framework for the study and understanding of how care is delivered, how health professionals work together to deliver that care, and how the health system can improve patient care and health care delivery — is one of several medical education innovations that has emerged from the work of the Accelerating Change in Medical Education Consortium. It has become one of the three pillars of medical education along with the basic and clinical sciences.

=== Master adaptive learner ===
The master adaptive learner concept also emerged from the work of the Accelerating Change in Medical Education Consortium. In American medical education, this term refers to a framework designed to prepare U.S. medical students, residents, and medical practitioners to continually adapt and respond to the rapidly evolving landscape of medical knowledge and practice. This concept emphasizes the importance of lifelong learning, self-regulation, and adaptability, enabling health professionals to provide high-quality care in an ever-changing environment.

=== Coaching in medical education ===
The consortium has been one of the main advocates of incorporating coaching into medical education. Academic coaches evaluate the performance of medical students via review of objective assessments, assisting the student to identify needs and create a plan to achieve these, and helping the student be accountable. Coaches help students improve their own self-monitoring, while fostering the idea that coaching will benefit them throughout their medical careers. The consortium hosts the Coaching Implementation Workshop, which is held annually in Chicago, and created the book, Coaching in Medical Education, which was published by Elsevier April 2022. Coaching has expanded to graduate medical education.

== Impact ==
Almost one-fifth of all U.S. MD- and DO-granting medical schools are represented in the consortium. In the first 5 years (2013–2018), the consortium medical schools delivered innovative educational experiences to approximately 19,000 medical students, who provide a potential 33 million patient care visits annually.

== Maintaining the consortium during the COVID-19 pandemic crisis ==
When the COVID-19 pandemic emerged in the U.S. in March 2020, the AMA staff reduced the workload of consortium members while trying to maintain the sense of community. The convenings that did happen in 2020 and 2021 were all virtual and served as an opportunity for AMA staff and consortium members to connect and support one another during the disruptive and challenging time for those in the health care community. AMA staff developed a four-phase model that guided their work during the pandemic. It included assessing needs, mining experts, convening people, and generating products.
