= Xiaolan Xie =

French systems engineer

Xiaolan Xie is a systems engineer from the Ecole nationale superieure des mines de Saint-Etienne, France. He is a graduate school professor, and heads the research department of healthcare engineering at Mines Saint-Etienne. He works in the Center for Biomedical & Healthcare Engineering (CIS), one of the five training and research centers of the Ecole des Mines, which brings together researchers in industrial engineering, computer science, biomechanics, and process engineering around health applications: biotechnologies, tissue engineering, e-health, computer assisted surgery, and medicine. Xie's department is a research team dedicated to healthcare systems and services.

Xie was named a Fellow of the Institute of Electrical and Electronics Engineers (IEEE) in 2015 for his contributions to systems engineering for health care and manufacturing.
