= Health systems engineering =

Engineering in health care systems

Health systems engineering or health engineering (often known as health care systems engineering (HCSE)) is an academic and a pragmatic discipline that approaches the health care industry, and other industries connected with health care delivery, as complex adaptive systems, and identifies and applies engineering design and analysis principles in such areas. This can overlap with biomedical engineering (BME) which focuses on design and development of various medical products; industrial engineering (IE) and operations management which involve improving organizational operations; and various health care practice fields like medicine, pharmacy, dentistry, nursing, etc. Other fields participating in this interdisciplinary area include public health, information technology, management studies, and regulatory law.

People whose work implicates this field in some capacity can include members of all the above-noted fields, many of which have sub-fields targeted toward health care matters even if health or health care is not a principal focus of the overall field (e.g. management, law). Areas of biomedical engineering in this area often include clinical engineering (sometimes also called "hospital engineering") as well as those BMEs developing medical devices and pharmaceutical drugs. The industrial engineering principles employed tend to include optimization, decision analysis, human factors engineering, quality engineering, and value engineering.

The field came to be in the 1950s and 1960s as an outgrowth of industrial engineering as applied to hospitals.

== See also ==
- Health system
- Healthcare engineering
- Health systems science
- Biological engineering
- Systems engineering
- Regulatory science
- Complex adaptive systems
