= Healthcare engineering =

Engineering in healthcare

In its succinct definition, healthcare engineering is "engineering involved in all aspects of healthcare". The term engineering in this definition covers all engineering disciplines such as biomedical, chemical, civil, computer, electrical, environmental, hospital architecture, industrial, information, materials, mechanical, software, and systems engineering.

Based on the definition of healthcare, a more elaborated definition is: "Healthcare engineering is engineering involved in all aspects of the prevention, diagnosis, treatment, and management of illness, as well as the preservation and improvement of physical and mental health and well-being, through the services offered to humans by the medical and allied health professions".

== Overview ==
Almost all engineering disciplines (e.g., biomedical, chemical, civil, computer, electrical, environmental, industrial, information, materials, mechanical, software, and systems engineering) have made significant contributions and brought about advances in healthcare. Contributions have also been made by healthcare professionals (e.g., physicians, dentists, nurses, pharmacists, allied health professionals, and health scientists) who are engaged in supporting, improving, and/or advancing healthcare through engineering approaches.

Healthcare engineering is expected to play a role of growing importance as healthcare continues to be one of the world's largest and fastest-growing industries where engineering is a major factor of advancement through creating, developing, and implementing cutting-edge devices, systems, and procedures attributed to breakthroughs in electronics, information technology, miniaturization, material science, optics, and other fields, to address challenges associated with issues such as the continued rise in healthcare costs, the quality and safety of healthcare, care of the aging population, management of common diseases, the impact of high technology, increasing demands for regulatory compliance, risk management, and reducing litigation risk. As the demand for engineers continues to increase in healthcare, healthcare engineering will be recognized as the most important profession where engineers make major contributions directly benefiting human health.

== History ==
The American Society of Healthcare Engineering (ASHE), established in 1962, was one of the first to publicize the term healthcare engineering. ASHE, as well as its many local affiliate societies, is devoted to the health care physical environment, including design, building, maintenance, and operation of hospitals and other health care facilities, which represents only one sector of engineers' activities in healthcare. The term healthcare engineers first appeared in the scientific literature in 1989, where the critical role of engineers in the healthcare delivery system was discussed. A number of academic programs have adopted the name healthcare engineering (e.g., Indiana University, Northwestern University, Purdue University, Texas Tech University, University of Illinois, University of Michigan, University of North Carolina, University of Southern California, University of Toronto), although the description or definition of the term by these programs varies, as each institution has designed its program based on its own distinctive interest, strength, and focus. The first scholarly journal dedicated to healthcare engineering, Journal of Healthcare Engineering, was launched in 2010 by Dr. Ming-Chien Chyu, focusing on engineering involved in all aspects of healthcare delivery processes and systems. In the meantime, a number of companies with various foci have adopted healthcare engineering in their names.

Healthcare engineering was first defined in a white paper published in 2015 by Chyu and 40 co-authors who are active members of and contributors to the healthcare engineering community around the world. The white paper was reviewed by more than 280 reviewers, including members of US National Academy of Engineering, engineering deans of the world's top universities, administrators and faculty members of healthcare engineering academic programs, leaders of healthcare/medical and engineering professional societies and associations, leaders of healthcare industry and government, and healthcare engineering professionals from around the world. This white paper documents a clear, rigorous definition of healthcare engineering as an academic discipline, an area of research, a field of specialty, and a profession, and is expected to raise the status and visibility of the field, help students choose healthcare engineering-related fields as majors, help engineers and healthcare professionals choose healthcare engineering as a profession, define healthcare engineering as a specialty area for the research community, funding agencies, and conference or event organizers, help job-search databases properly categorize healthcare engineering jobs, help healthcare employers recruit from the right pool of expertise, bring academic administrators' attention to healthcare engineering in considering new program initiations, help governments and institutions of different levels put healthcare engineering into perspective for policy making, budgeting, and other purposes, and help publishers and librarians categorize literature related to healthcare engineering. Based on this white paper, a global, non-profit professional organization, Healthcare Engineering Alliance Society (HEALS), was founded by Chyu in 2015, which focuses on improving and advancing all aspects of healthcare through engineering approaches. The white paper has been cited in numerous scientific papers.

== Purpose ==
The purpose of healthcare engineering is to improve human health and well-being through engineering approaches.

== Scope ==
Healthcare engineering covers the following two major fields:

1. Engineering for healthcare intervention: engineering involved in the development or provision of any treatment, preventive care, or test that a person could take or undergo to improve health or to help with a particular health problem.
2. Engineering for healthcare systems: engineering involved in the complete network of organizations, agencies, facilities, information systems, management systems, financing mechanisms, logistics, and all trained personnel engaged in delivering healthcare within a geographical area.

=== Healthcare engineering subjects ===
Updated ramifications and lists of topics within individual subjects are available from authoritative sources such as the leading societies/associations of individual subjects and government organizations.

(I) Engineering for healthcare intervention

Fundamentals

- Biomechanics
- Biomaterials
- Biomedical instruments
- Medical devices
- Engineering for surgery
- Medical imaging
- Organ transplantation
- Artificial organs
- Drug delivery
- Genetic engineering
- Engineering for diagnosis/detection
- Health informatics, information engineering and decision support
- Disinfection engineering

Engineering for disease prevention, diagnosis, treatment, and management

- Cardiovascular disease
- Cancer
- Alzheimer's disease
- Diabetes
- Respiratory disease
- Obesity
- Degenerative diseases
- Others

Engineering for patient care

- Patient safety
- Critical care
- Neonatal care
- Home healthcare
- Elderly care
- Patient monitoring
- Health disparities
- Disaster management

Engineering for medical specialties

- Allergy and immunology
- Anesthesiology
- Cardiology
- Critical care medicine
- Emergency medicine
- Endocrinology
- Gastroenterology
- General surgery
- Geriatrics
- Infectious disease
- Neurology
- Neurosurgery
- Nuclear medicine
- Occupational medicine
- Oncology
- Ophthalmology
- Orthopedics
- Pathology
- Pediatrics
- Physical medicine and rehabilitation
- Plastic, reconstructive and aesthetic surgery
- Public health
- Pulmonology
- Radiology
- Radiotherapy
- Rheumatology
- Sports medicine
- Urology
- Vascular medicine
- Others

Engineering for dental specialties

- Endodontics
- Oral and maxillofacial pathology, radiology, and surgery
- Orthodontics and dentofacial orthopedics
- Periodontics
- Prosthodontics
- Others

Engineering for allied health specialties

- Audiology
- Clinical laboratory science
- Environmental health
- Occupational therapy
- Orthotics and prosthetics
- Physical therapy
- Rehabilitation
- Respiratory therapy
- Speech therapy
- Others

Engineering for nursing – including nursing in all related areas

Engineering for pharmacy

- Pharmaceutical design and development
- Bio-/pharmaceutical manufacturing
- Pharmaceutical devices
- Pharmaceutical testing
- Pharmaceutical information systems
- Clinical science
- Regulatory compliance

(II) Engineering for healthcare systems

Healthcare system management, improvement and reform

- Quality, cost, efficiency, effectiveness
- Operations research and systems engineering
- Lean, Six Sigma, total quality management
- Human factors
- High reliability organization
- Resilience engineering
- Rural health

Healthcare information systems

- Electronic health record
- eHealth
- mHealth
- Telemedicine
- Wireless technology
- Data mining and big data
- Information security

Healthcare facilities

- Healthcare infrastructure
- Healthcare energy systems
- Healthcare sustainability and green design
- Environmental health and safety

Healthcare policy

(III) Others

Healthcare engineering education and training

- Collegiate education
- Continued education

Future of healthcare

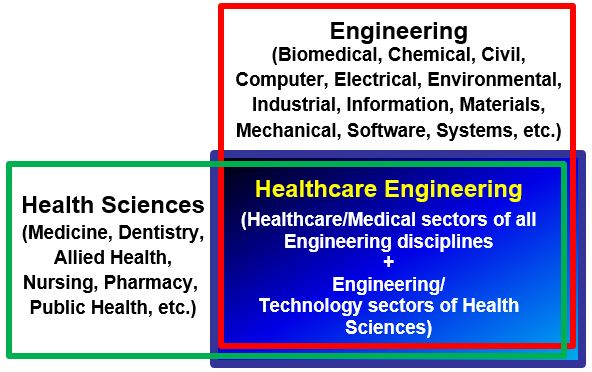
Figure 1. Healthcare engineering: synergy of engineering and health sciences. Red block: All engineering disciplines. Green block: All health sciences disciplines. Blue block: All healthcare engineering disciplines.

== Synergy ==
Healthcare engineering features a synergy among the healthcare and medical sectors of all engineering disciplines and the engineering and technology sectors of the health sciences, as depicted in Figure 1.

== Professional ==
Healthcare engineering professionals are mainly (a) engineers from all engineering disciplines such as biomedical, chemical, civil, computer, electrical, environmental, industrial, information, materials, mechanical, software, and systems engineering, and (b) healthcare professionals such as physicians, dentists, nurses, pharmacists, allied health professionals, and health scientists, who are engaged in supporting, improving, and/or advancing any aspect of healthcare through engineering approaches, in accordance with the above definition of healthcare engineering. Since some healthcare professionals engaged in healthcare engineering may not be considered to be "engineers", "healthcare engineering professional" is a more appropriate term than "Healthcare Engineer".

== Venue ==
Healthcare engineering professionals generally perform their jobs in, with, or for the healthcare industry. Major sectors and subsectors of healthcare industry along with healthcare engineering professionals' contributions are summarized in Table 2.

Table 2. Healthcare industry classification and contributions of healthcare engineering
Healthcare Industry			Contributions of healthcare engineering
Sector	Subsector	Definition	Contributions of healthcare engineering
Healthcare services, equipment, and systems	Health care providers	Health maintenance organizations, hospitals, clinics, dentists, allied health providers, opticians, nursing homes, rehabilitation facilities, retirement centers, and home healthcare providers.	Healthcare engineering professionals play key roles in creating and developing hardware and software to innovate, support, improve and optimize the operation processes and systems of patient care, and to improve patient outcomes through engineering approaches.
Healthcare services, equipment, and systems	Medical equipment	Manufacturers and distributors of medical instruments (e.g., blood pressure monitor), medical devices (e.g., surgical robot), imaging machines (e.g., X-ray, MRI), artificial organs, and other non-disposable medical devices as well as medical software.	This is an area heavily relying on engineering expertise, and where healthcare engineering professionals make major contributions in basic research that leads to technology breakthroughs, as well as subsequent design, development, and manufacturing of medical devices and equipment.
Healthcare services, equipment, and systems	Medical supplies	Manufacturers and distributors of medical supplies used by health care providers and the general public, including makers of implants, contact lenses, eyeglass lenses, bandages and other disposable medical supplies.	Healthcare engineering professionals contribute to the research and development of new products and manufacturing in terms of process design, machinery, automation, quality control, and cost reduction.
Healthcare services, equipment, and systems	Healthcare systems	Companies that specialize in healthcare systems including facilities, information, financial, and other systems.	Healthcare engineering professionals work with healthcare providers to design, construct, improve, and/or operate healthcare facilities, information, financial, and other healthcare systems, following special regulations.
Biotechnology and pharmaceuticals	Biotechnology	Companies engaged in research into and development of biological substances leading to new drugs and/or medical procedures.	Healthcare engineering professionals lead or participate in research and development of cutting-edge technologies for new drugs (including drug discovery, design, development, and delivery) and advanced medical procedures for the prevention, diagnosis, treatment, and management of illnesses.
Biotechnology and pharmaceuticals	Pharmaceuticals	Manufacturers of prescription or over-the-counter drugs, such as aspirin, cold remedies and birth control pills, including vaccine producers.	Healthcare engineering professionals contribute to the pharmaceutical manufacturing processes in terms of process design, unit operation, quality control, and cost reduction.
Healthcare consulting, support, and education		Companies that provide consulting service and support to healthcare, as well as continued education to healthcare personnel.	Healthcare engineering professionals provide consulting service, support, and education on all aspects of healthcare involving engineering, such as optimizing healthcare operations, solving problems, providing informatics service, as well as designing, planning and/or executing new projects.

== Education and training ==
Engineers from almost all engineering disciplines (such as biomedical, chemical, civil, computer, electrical, environmental, industrial, information, materials, mechanical, software, and systems engineering) are always in demand in healthcare. It is a common misconception that only engineers with a background in biomedical engineering, clinical engineering, or related areas may work in healthcare. However, there is a need for courses and certificate type of programs that prepare non-biomedical engineering students and practicing engineers for service in healthcare. On the other hand, healthcare professionals (physicians, dentists, nurses, pharmacists, allied health professionals, etc.) may benefit from training to apply engineering to their practice, problem solving, and advancing healthcare. Due to the rapid advance of technology, continuing education plays a crucial role in ensuring healthcare engineering professionals' continued competence.

== See also ==
- Health systems engineering
- Health systems science
