= Susan Skochelak =

American physician and public health professional

Susan E. Skochelak
- Occupations: family physician, medical educator

Susan E. Skochelak is an American physician and public health professional known for her contributions to medical education and health care innovation.

== Early life and education ==
Skochelak graduated with a bachelor's degree in medical technology from Michigan Technological University in 1975 and received a master's degree in biological sciences from the same institution in 1977. She was the guest speaker at the institution's graduation ceremony in 2015. She completed medical school at the University of Michigan in 1981.

== Career ==
Skochelak served as the senior associate dean for academic affairs at the University of Wisconsin School of Medicine and Public Health from 1997 through 2009. During that time, she was also the director of the Wisconsin Area Health Education Center, chair of the Consortium of Primary Care for Wisconsin, and a member of the governor's Rural Health Development Council.

She became the vice president for medical education at the American Medical Association in 2009. In that role, she created the Accelerating Change in Medical Education initiative, a $20 million grant program that supported a consortium of medical schools making transformative changes in medical student education.

In 2015 Skochelak was elected to the National Academy of Medicine. In 2019, she was named one of Crain's Notable Women in Health Care.

== Bibliography ==
Health Systems Science, Lead editor, 1st and 2nd editions
