= Persecution of Uyghurs in Turkey =

Series of oppression of ethnic Uyghurs in Turkey

The persecution of Uyghurs in Turkey refers to the repression, deportation, mistreatment, and imprisonment of Uyghurs in Turkey, mostly asylum seekers and refugees.

== History ==
Turkey was known as a safe haven for many Uyghurs who were fleeing repression in China. Recep Tayyip Erdoğan himself referred to the Chinese policies in Xinjiang as a genocide, although in the late 2010s, when he shifted to Turkish nationalist and anti-Western views, he also shifted Turkey away from the West and more towards China and Russia, and he even stopped criticising China and their Xinjiang policies. Uyghurs could not host large protests in Turkey as they could before. Erdoğan praised Chinese policies towards minorities. In 2015, Erdoğan stated that he condemned Uyghur "terrorist activities" in Xinjiang, drawing criticism from the World Uyghur Congress. In 2017, Turkey officially designated the East Turkistan Islamic Movement as a terrorist organization, after similar designations from the United Kingdom and the United Nations.

Crackdowns escalated in 2020 and 2021. Thousands of Uyghurs began leaving Turkey for Europe in fears of being targeted. They also criticised Erdoğan for being silent on Uyghurs yet being quick to defend other Muslims worldwide. Erdoğan claimed that some people were seeking to "abuse" the Uyghur issue to sabotage the "Turkish–Chinese relationship". In March 2021, the Turkish parliament rejected a motion to recognize the Persecution of Uyghurs in China as a genocide. Mevlüt Çavuşoğlu claimed that Turkey will never pick China over Uyghurs, although his political opposition quickly dismissed him as attempting to attract voters. In 2023, Uyghur activists continued to protest against Erdoğan and his policies.

== Police activity ==
The Uyghur community complained that it became harder to get Turkish residence permits or citizenship after 2014. Some of their homes were raided, with hundreds being arrested and having their deportations to China arranged.

In 2020, Uyghurs reported mistreatment and routine arrests in large numbers in interviews with NPR. Some Uyghurs in Istanbul told NPR that they fear Turkish police and foreign pressure from China.

== Extradition and deportation ==
Erdoğan began a crackdown on Uyghurs in Turkey, deporting many to the countries they came from, where they were extradited to China. According to the president of the Uyghur American Association in 2021, Uyghur deportees were commonly extradited to China through third-parties such as Tajikistan.

In 2017, China ratified an agreement with Turkey for the extraditions of wanted people in both countries, and while Turkey did not ratify it, there was allegations that Uyghurs were secretly being extradited to China. The MHP, known for its vocalness about Turkic peoples, largely stopped speaking on the Uyghur issue after 2021 and did not voice any opposition for the proposed Chinese-Turkish extradition deal.

== See also ==
- Istanbul nightclub shooting
- Persecution of Uyghurs in China
