= Master adaptive learner =

Medical education concept

The master adaptive learner (MAL) concept in American medical education refers to a framework designed to prepare U.S. medical students, residents, and medical practitioners to continually adapt and respond to the rapidly evolving landscape of medical knowledge and practice. This metacognitive approach to learning or "learning to learn" is based on self-regulation that fosters the development and use of adaptive expertise in practice. This concept emphasizes the importance of lifelong learning, self-regulation, and adaptability, enabling health professionals to provide high-quality care in an ever-changing environment.

The MAL concept aligns with competency-based medical education, which is becoming more common and focuses on defining specific competencies or skills required for effective practice, assessing learners based on these competencies, and allowing progression based on demonstrated proficiency rather than time-based criteria. MAL also aligns to the newer concept of precision education which is being proposed as a model for lifelong learning for medical students, residents, fellows, and physicians. Precision education is an educational approach that tailors learning experiences and interventions based on individual student needs, strengths, and learning styles. Precision education utilizes data-driven insights and personalized strategies to optimize educational outcomes, fostering greater student engagement, understanding, and achievement.

== History ==
The MAL framework was first outlined in the scientific literature in 2017. The concept emerged from the recognition that medical knowledge is expanding at an unprecedented rate. Traditional frameworks for medical education, which often focus on the acquisition of static knowledge, are insufficient to prepare health professionals for the dynamic nature of medical practice. The MAL framework aims to cultivate skills that help learners not only acquire new knowledge but also adapt and apply this knowledge effectively in diverse and unpredictable clinical settings.

== Core principles ==
The master adaptive learner framework is built on four key principles:

1. Self-regulated learning

Self-regulated learning involves the ability to set goals, monitor progress, and adjust learning strategies as needed. This includes self-assessment, reflection, and the ability to seek feedback. The MAL framework encourages learners to take an active role in their education, fostering independence and self-efficacy.

2. Adaptive expertise

Adaptive expertise is the ability to apply knowledge and skills flexibly and innovatively in different situations. Unlike routine experts, who rely on well-practiced routines, adaptive experts can think critically and creatively, making them more effective in novel or complex scenarios.

3. Lifelong learning

Lifelong learning is the continuous pursuit of knowledge and skills throughout a professional's career. The MAL framework promotes a culture of ongoing education and professional development, recognizing that medical knowledge and best practices are constantly evolving.

4. Reflection and feedback

Reflection and feedback are crucial components of the MAL framework. Reflective practice involves regularly analyzing one's own experiences and performance to identify strengths and areas for improvement. Constructive feedback from peers, mentors, and patients helps learners refine their skills and knowledge.

== Implementation in medical education ==
Implementing the MAL framework in medical education requires a multifaceted approach.

=== Curriculum design ===
When designing medical curricula, opportunities for self-directed learning, critical thinking, and problem-solving should be incorporated. This includes case-based learning, simulations, and other active learning strategies that encourage students to apply knowledge in practical settings.

=== Assessment methods ===
Assessments should evaluate not only factual knowledge but also the ability to apply knowledge adaptively. This may involve formative assessments, reflective exercises, and performance-based evaluations that provide meaningful feedback and guide further learning.

=== Faculty development ===
Faculty members play a crucial role in fostering the skills associated with the MAL framework. Training programs for educators should focus on mentoring, providing effective feedback, and creating an environment that supports adaptive learning.

=== Learning environment ===
Creating a supportive learning environment is essential. This includes access to resources, opportunities for collaboration, and a culture that values continuous improvement and innovation.

=== Coaching ===
Coaching is frequently a part of medical school curricula that incorporates the MAL framework. This coaching helps learners take appropriate action in response to feedback and assessment.

=== Informatics ===
A learning environment focused on the MAL framework requires a robust informatics infrastructure to identify learning needs and assist in guiding learners on individualized paths.

== Benefits ==
Limited evidence indicates that the MAL framework can reduce burnout and increase resiliency, although the mechanism of this is unclear.

== Challenges ==
While the MAL framework holds promise, its implementation faces challenges. Implementing the MAL framework is resource intensive, requires a cultural shift, and new assessment methods.

== Implementation into physical therapy education ==
The MAL framework is increasingly spreading from medical schools to physical therapy education. The MAL framework has been proposed as a strategy to address the physical therapy needs of those with COVID-19 as well as address systemic racism and other injustices.

== Future directions ==
The Master Adaptive Learner concept represents a paradigm shift in medical education, focusing on developing health care professionals who are equipped to navigate and excel in an ever-changing medical landscape. By fostering self-regulation, adaptive expertise, and lifelong learning, the MAL framework aims to enhance the quality of health care and ensure that practitioners remain competent and innovative throughout their careers. It will most likely have a significant role as medical education increasingly incorporates competency-based medical education and precision education modalities.
