= Shohret Hoshur =

American Uyghur journalist (born 1965)

- شۆھرەت ھوشۇر
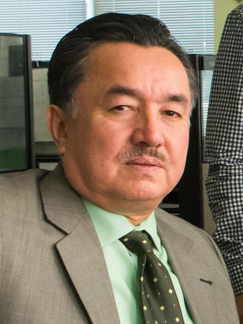
- Shöhret Hoshur in 2018
- Born: 1965 (age 60–61); Ghulja, Xinjiang
- Citizenship: United States
- Known for: Uyghur activist, Radio Free Asia journalist

Shöhret Hoshur (Uyghur: شۆھرەت ھوشۇر; born 1965) is an Uyghur American journalist working for Radio Free Asia. Since leaving Xinjiang in 1994, he has become known for his reporting on the region.

== Life and career ==
Hoshur is a political émigré from the Uighur Region of China and an opponent of the Sinicization of his homeland. He left China in 1994 when his journalism got him "into trouble with the authorities" and now works for Radio Free Asia in Washington, D.C. According to the New York Times, Hoshur's "accounts of violence in his homeland are among the few reliable sources of information about incidents in a part of China that the government has sought to hide from international scrutiny". Chinese authorities accused Hoshur of instigating the July 2009 Ürümqi riots with his reporting. He was credited by McClatchey in October 2015 as being the sole journalist able to get accurate news out of Xinjiang Province, China.

== Family arrest ==
China arrested one of Hoshur's brothers in 2014, sentencing him to five years in prison. Two other brothers were arrested in 2015. Hoshur calls the arrests and trials of his brothers "thin excuses to justify the continued harassment of me as a journalist reporting on events in China's Uighur region". The United States Department of State has urged Chinese authorities "to cease harassment of his family and to treat them fairly and with dignity".
