= Uyghurs in Turkey =

Ethnic group in Turkey

Total population
- >300,000-1,000,000

Regions with significant populations
- Istanbul, Antalya, Alanya, Kayseri, Ankara

Languages
- Turkish, Uyghur, Chinese

Religion
- Sunni Islam

The Uyghurs in Turkey are members of the Uyghur diaspora that live in Turkey.

== History ==
There is a long history of the connection between the Turkish people and the Uyghurs. Both groups speak a Turkic language and the two groups share significant ethnic and cultural bonds.

With Turkey being a Turkic country, the Uyghurs have been largely able to integrate within Turkish society. Turkey has been the home of a sizable Uyghur population in the Middle East fleeing from the Xinjiang conflict. Uyghurs who wish to migrate to Europe and the United States often choose Turkey as the transit point. Turkey has been concerned by the Uyghur situation, although it had been criticized for being helpless.

Since the Syrian Civil War, Uyghurs have participated in several jihadist battalion groups, some of which are believed to have connections with the Turkish government. Uyghurs in Turkey have partly contributed to them, notably the Turkistan Islamic Party in Syria. In 2017, Reuters reported that exiles and human rights groups stated that Uyghurs had escaped Chinese human rights abuses by fleeing to Turkey. At that time, the Syrian Ambassador to China had stated that up to 5,000 Uyghurs were fighting in the Syrian Civil war, citing Syrian statistics on casualties and prisoners of war captured by Syria. The ambassador said that most Uyghur fighters in the region had been fighting "under their own banner" of separatism, though he stated that a minority had fought with ISIL.

== Demographics ==
Cities	Population
Total	350,000
Istanbul	100000+
Antalya	50000
Kayseri	50000
Ankara	20000
Konya	15000
Bursa	10000-12000
İzmir	10000
Mersin	8000
Adana	7000
Gaziantep	6000
Malkara	5000
Şanlıurfa	5000
Erzurum	4000
Van	4000
Sivas	3500
Tokat (il)	3000
Malatya	3000
Diyarbakır	3000
Eskişehir	2500
Balıkesir	2000
Elazığ	2000
Sakarya	1500
Afyonkarahisar	1000
Başka şehirler	20-30 bin

The estimate for the number of Uyghurs living Turkey varies across sources. In 2018, The Economist reported that over 10,000 Uyghurs live in Turkey. Voice of America estimated over 45,000 Uyghurs live in Turkey, based on Uyghur advocating groups, with 10,000 as refugees. In 2021, Tokyo-based English language online news magazine Nikkei Asia and online news publication Coda Story reported that 50,000 Uyghurs lived in Turkey, with Nikkei Asia reporting that the diaspora was "largest outside of Central Asia."

== See also ==
- Eretna, medieval ruler in Anatolia of Uyghur origin and founder of the Eretnid dynasty
- Istanbul nightclub shooting#Aftermath a terror incident in Istanbul in which up to 50 Uyghurs were suspected to be involved
