= Health systems science =

Health systems science (HSS) is a foundational platform and framework for the study and understanding of how care is delivered, how health professionals work together to deliver that care, and how the health system can improve patient care and health care delivery. It is one of the three pillars of medical education along with the basic and clinical sciences. HSS includes the following core foundational domains: health care structure and process; health system improvement; value in health care; population, public, and social determinants of health; clinical informatics and health technology; and health care policy and economics. It also includes four functional domains: ethics and legal; change agency, management, and advocacy; teaming; and leadership. Systems thinking links all of these domains together. Patient, family, and community are at the center of HSS.

== History and development ==
HSS, which was originally referred to as systems-based practice, emerged in response to the growing recognition that effective health care delivery requires more than just clinical expertise. It acknowledges that health care systems are complex, adaptive systems influenced by a multitude of factors, including social determinants of health, policy decisions, organizational structures, and patient preferences.

The World Health Organization first recognized the need to educate physicians about the link between health and the systems in which people live, work, and play in 1978. The quality and patient safety movement of the 1980s and 1990s further reinforced the need for physicians to understand systems thinking. The Association of American Medical Colleges' Core Entrustable Professional Activities for Entering Residency (CEPAERs) started including identifying system failures and making contributions to a culture of safety and improvement in 1999. That year, the Accreditation Council for Graduate Medical Education also included systems-based practice as one of its six core competency domains. In 2001, the Health Resources and Services Administration funded an 18-medical-school consortium to launch several pilots related to systems-based education. In 2005, the book, Professionalism in Tomorrow's Healthcare System, outlined several aspects of the systems-based practice competency.

Medical schools and residency and fellowship programs, however, struggled to teach these competencies. The framework for HSS was developed to address this struggle and is built on a foundation of systems thinking and the biopsychosocial model developed by George L. Engel. It aims to educate physicians to become systems citizens.

From 2013 to 2015 the American Medical Association's (AMA) Accelerating Change in Medical Education Consortium of 11 U.S. medical schools worked to identify a comprehensive framework for HSS training. In 2017, a review of 30 grant submissions to the AMA Accelerating Change in Medical Education initiative and an analysis of the HSS-related curricula at the 11 medical schools that were members of the Accelerating Change in Medical Education Consortium formed the groundwork toward the development of a potential comprehensive HSS curricular framework with domains and subcategories.

Barriers to incorporating HSS into medical education include student resistance because it is not always viewed as essential to passing physician licensing and credentialing exams and limitations in the number of medical school faculty with expertise to teach HSS domains.

An increasing number of new medical schools have created their initial curriculum with HSS fully integrated including Kaiser Permanente Bernard J. Tyson School of Medicine, which matriculated its first class in July 2020, and the Alice L. Walton School of Medicine, which is expected to matriculate its first class in 2025.

== Future directions ==
As health care continues to evolve, the importance of HSS is expected to grow. Efforts to integrate HSS into medical education and practice will be essential for preparing physicians to navigate the complexities of modern health care delivery, advocate for their patients, and contribute to improving the health of populations.

HSS is also expanding to other health professions. In 2023, the National Academies of Sciences, Engineering, and Medicine hosted a series of workshops focused on integrating HSS across the learning curriculum. HSS has been expanding to physician assistants, nurses, and other health care professionals.

== Health systems science in Korea ==
The Korean Association of Medical Colleges has proposed replacing medical humanities with health systems science in that country's medical education system, although critics say that it needs adaptation to the Korean health system.

== Health systems science in South Africa ==
The American Medical Association collaborated with the University of Witwatersrand to customize health systems science for the South African health system.

== Health systems science in the United Kingdom ==
Health systems science is also referred to as clinical governance in the United Kingdom, although this does not include all the domains included in the American HSS framework.

== Notable figures and organizations ==
Susan Skochelak, MD, MPH, creator of the Accelerating Change in Medical Education initiative and lead editor of the first and second editions of the Health Systems Science textbook.

Schools involved in the AMA Accelerating Change in Medical Education initiative that helped create the HSS framework:

- Warren Alpert Medical School of Brown University
- Brody School of Medicine at East Carolina University
- University of California, San Francisco, School of Medicine
- University of California, Davis, School of Medicine
- Indiana University School of Medicine
- Mayo Clinic Alix School of Medicine
- University of Michigan Medical School
- New York University Grossman School of Medicine
- Oregon Health & Science University School of Medicine
- Penn State University College of Medicine
- Vanderbilt University School of Medicine

== See also ==
- Health systems engineering
- Medical humanities
