= Bosniak National Council =

Bosniak National Council may refer to:

- Bosniak National Council (North Macedonia)
- Bosniak National Council (Serbia)

== See also ==
- World Bosniak Congress
- Bosniak Academy of Sciences and Arts
