= Ledenice (disambiguation) =

Ledenice is a market town in the Czech Republic.

Ledenice may also refer to:

- Ledenice, Croatia, a village near Novi Vinodolski
- Donje Ledenice, a village in Bosnia and Herzegovina
- Gornje Ledenice, a village in Bosnia and Herzegovina
