= Tramošnica =

Tramošnica may refer to:

- Donja Tramošnica, a village in the municipality of Gradačac, Bosnia and Herzegovina
- Gornja Tramošnica, a village in the municipality of Gradačac, Bosnia and Herzegovina
