= Biljačići =

- Village
- Location within Bosnia and Herzegovina
- Coordinates: 44.4507618°N 18.1266052°E
- Country: Bosnia and Herzegovina
- Entity: Federation of Bosnia and Herzegovina
- Canton: Zenica-Doboj
- Municipality: Zavidovići

Area
  - Total: 0.70 sq mi (1.81 km^{2})

Population (2013)
  - Total: 208
  - Density: 298/sq mi (115/km^{2})
- Time zone: UTC+1 (CET)
  - Summer (DST): UTC+2 (CEST)

Biljačići is a village in the municipality of Zavidovići, Bosnia and Herzegovina.

== Demographics ==
According to the 2013 census, its population was 208.

Ethnicity in 2013
Ethnicity	Number	Percentage
Croats	127	61.1%
Bosniaks	71	34.1%
Serbs	4	1.9%
other/undeclared	6	2.9%
Total	208	100%
