= Mustafa Cerić =

5th Grand Mufti of Bosnia and Herzegovina from 1993 to 2012

Effendi Mustafa Cerić
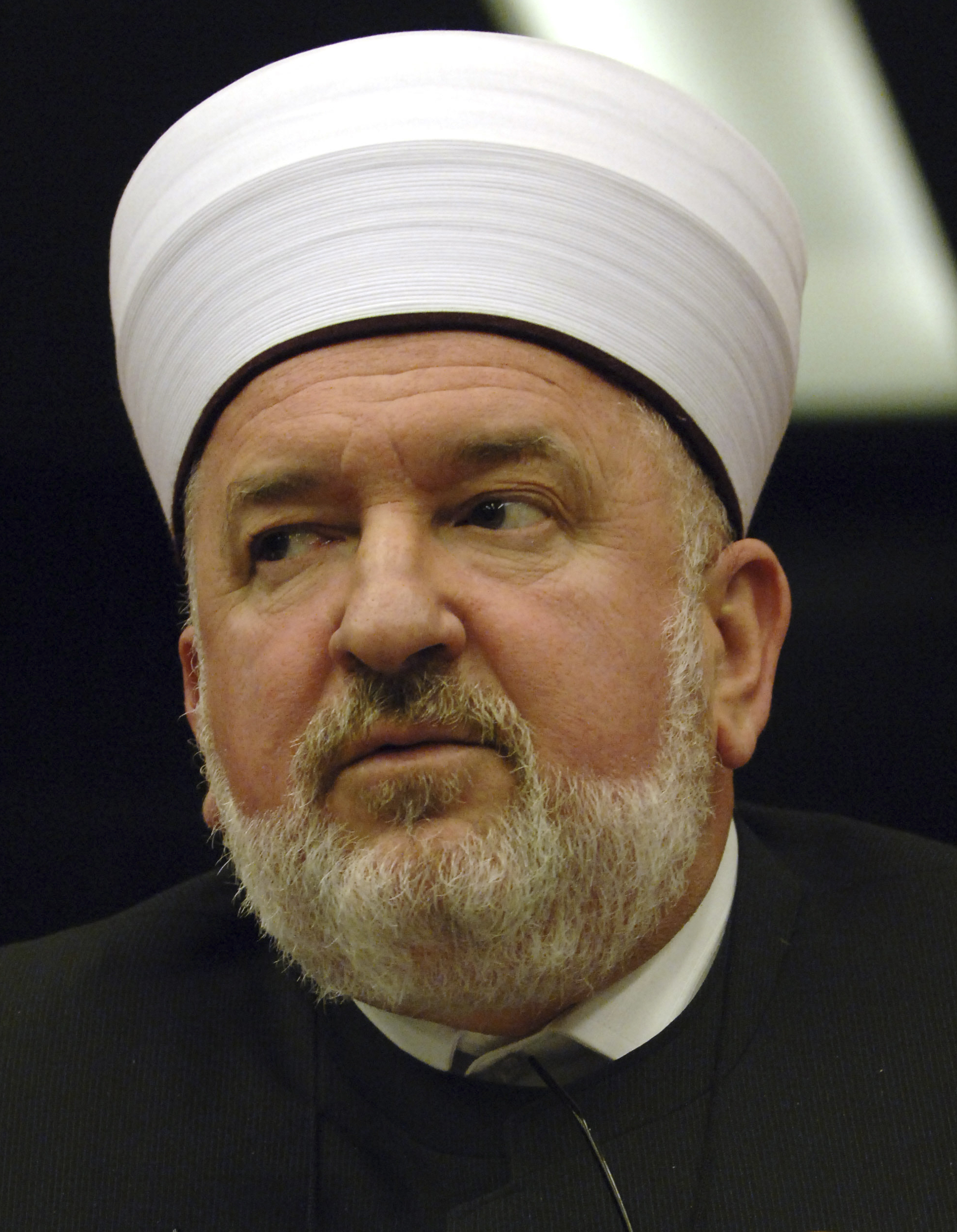
- Cerić in 2006
- Title: 5th Grand Mufti of Bosnia and Herzegovina

Personal life
- Born: 5 February 1952 (age 74) Veliko Čajno, PR Bosnia and Herzegovina, FPR Yugoslavia
- Children: 3
- Education: Al-Azhar University; University of Chicago
- Occupation: World Bosniak Congress (2012–present)

Religious life
- Religion: Sunni Islam

Senior posting
- Period in office: April 1993 – 19 November 2012
- Predecessor: Jakub Selimoski (as Grand Mufti of Yugoslavia)
- Successor: Husein Kavazović

Mustafa ef. Cerić (Bosnian pronunciation: [mustafaː tserit͡ɕ], born 5 February 1952) is a Bosnian cleric who served as the Grand Mufti of Bosnia and Herzegovina from 1993 to 2012, and is currently president of the World Bosniak Congress. In the 2014 general election, he ran for a seat in the Presidency of Bosnia and Herzegovina as a Bosniak member, but was not elected.

Cerić ensured that Islam is a strong element of Bosniak nationalism and has argued that Bosnia and Herzegovina should become a Bosniak nation state as Croats and Serbs already have their own nation states, Croatia and Serbia.

== Biography ==
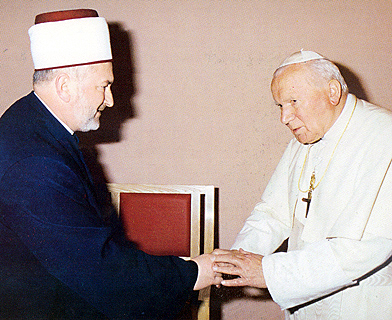
Cerić meeting Pope John Paul II in Sarajevo, 12 April 1997

Cerić was born on 5 February 1952 in Veliko Čajno, near Visoko. He graduated from the Gazi Husrev-beg Madrasa in Sarajevo and received a scholarship to Al-Azhar University in Cairo, Egypt. Cerić then returned to Yugoslavia, where he became an Imam. In 1981, he accepted the position of Imam at the Islamic Cultural Center of Greater Chicago (ICC) in Northbrook, Illinois and lived in the U.S. for several years.

During his time in the United States, Cerić learned English and earned a Ph.D. degree in Islamic Studies at the University of Chicago. After his studies, he left the ICC and returned to Yugoslavia and became an Imam again in a learning center in Zagreb in 1987.

Cerić became head of the Islamic Community of Bosnia and Herzegovina in April 1993. He officially became the Grand Mufti of Bosnia and Herzegovina in 1999. He was succeeded as Grand Mufti on 19 November 2012 by Husein Kavazović. In 2011, Cerić was one of the founders of the Bosniak Academy of Sciences and Arts. In December 2012, he was one of the founders of the World Bosniak Congress, and serves as its president.

Cerić is one of the signatories of A Common Word Between Us and You, an open letter by Islamic scholars to Christian leaders, calling for peace and understanding. He is also a member of the Committee of Conscience fighting against the Holocaust denial.

== Awards ==
Cerić was the co-recipient of the 2003 UNESCO Félix Houphouët-Boigny Peace Prize and recipient of the International Council of Christians and Jews Annual Sternberg Award "for exceptional contribution to interfaith understanding." He also received the 2007 Theodor-Heuss-Stiftung award for his contribution to spreading and strengthening democracy."

In 2007, Cerić was named the recipient of the Lifetime Achievement Award by the Association of Muslim Social Scientists UK "in recognition of his distinguished contributions to better understanding between Faiths, outstanding scholarship, for promoting a climate of respect and peaceful co-existence, and a wider recognition of the place of faith in Europe and the West."

Cerić was a 2008 recipient of the Eugen Biser Foundation award for his efforts in promoting understanding and peace between Islamic and Christian thought. He accepted the invitation of Tony Blair to be on the advisory council of the Tony Blair Faith Foundation in June 2008.

== Personal life ==
Cerić is fluent in his native Bosnian, as well as English and Arabic. He additionally cites a "passive knowledge" of Turkish, German and French.

== Publications ==
- "The challenge of a single Muslim authority in Europe" (December 2007), springerlink.com
- Roots of Synthetic Theology in Islam
- A Choice Between War and Peace
- "A Declaration of European Muslims", rferl.org, 16 March 2006.

Religious titles
Preceded by Jakub Selimoski as Grand Mufti of Yugoslavia	5th Grand Mufti of Bosnia and Herzegovina; 1993–2012	Succeeded by Husein Kavazović
