= Ridžali =

- Village
- Location within Bosnia and Herzegovina
- Coordinates: 44.4504214°N 18.1399226°E
- Country: Bosnia and Herzegovina
- Entity: Federation of Bosnia and Herzegovina
- Canton: Zenica-Doboj
- Municipality: Zavidovići

Area
  - Total: 0.085 sq mi (0.22 km^{2})

Population (2013)
  - Total: 249
  - Density: 2,900/sq mi (1,100/km^{2})
- Time zone: UTC+1 (CET)
  - Summer (DST): UTC+2 (CEST)

Ridžali is a village in the municipality of Zavidovići, Bosnia and Herzegovina.

== Demographics ==
According to the 2013 census, its population was 249.

Ethnicity in 2013
Ethnicity	Number	Percentage
Bosniaks	207	83.1%
Croats	20	8.0%
Serbs	7	2.8%
other/undeclared	15	6.0%
Total	249	100%
