= Mahoje =

- Village
- Location within Bosnia and Herzegovina
- Coordinates: 44.4031875°N 18.2367897°E
- Country: Bosnia and Herzegovina
- Entity: Federation of Bosnia and Herzegovina
- Canton: Zenica-Doboj
- Municipality: Zavidovići

Area
  - Total: 4.80 sq mi (12.43 km^{2})

Population (2013)
  - Total: 408
  - Density: 85.0/sq mi (32.8/km^{2})
- Time zone: UTC+1 (CET)
  - Summer (DST): UTC+2 (CEST)

Mahoje is a village in the municipality of Zavidovići, Bosnia and Herzegovina.

== Demographics ==
According to the 2013 census, its population was 408, all Bosniaks.
