= Dragovac, Bosnia and Herzegovina =

Dragovac Драговац
- Village
- Location within Bosnia and Herzegovina
- Coordinates: 44.431323°N 18.1468075°E
- Country: Bosnia and Herzegovina
- Entity: Federation of Bosnia and Herzegovina
- Canton: Zenica-Doboj
- Municipality: Zavidovići

Area
  - Total: 0.093 sq mi (0.24 km^{2})

Population (2013)
  - Total: 445
  - Density: 4,800/sq mi (1,900/km^{2})
- Time zone: UTC+1 (CET)
  - Summer (DST): UTC+2 (CEST)

Dragovac is a village in the municipality of Zavidovići, Bosnia and Herzegovina.

== Demographics ==
According to the 2013 census, its population was 445.

Ethnicity in 2013
Ethnicity	Number	Percentage
Bosniaks	432	97.1%
other/undeclared	13	2.9%
Total	445	100%
