= Činovići =

- Village
- Location within Bosnia and Herzegovina
- Coordinates: 44.44908°N 18.1929023°E
- Country: Bosnia and Herzegovina
- Entity: Federation of Bosnia and Herzegovina
- Canton: Zenica-Doboj
- Municipality: Zavidovići

Area
  - Total: 4.16 sq mi (10.78 km^{2})

Population (2013)
  - Total: 3,045
  - Density: 731.6/sq mi (282.5/km^{2})
- Time zone: UTC+1 (CET)
  - Summer (DST): UTC+2 (CEST)

Činovići is a village in the municipality of Zavidovići, Bosnia and Herzegovina.

== Demographics ==
According to the 2013 census, its population was 3,045.

Ethnicity in 2013
Ethnicity	Number	Percentage
Bosniaks	3,008	98.8%
Serbs	1	0.0%
other/undeclared	36	1.2%
Total	3,045	100%
