= Gradačac =

- City
- Grad Gradačac; Град Градачац; City of Gradačac
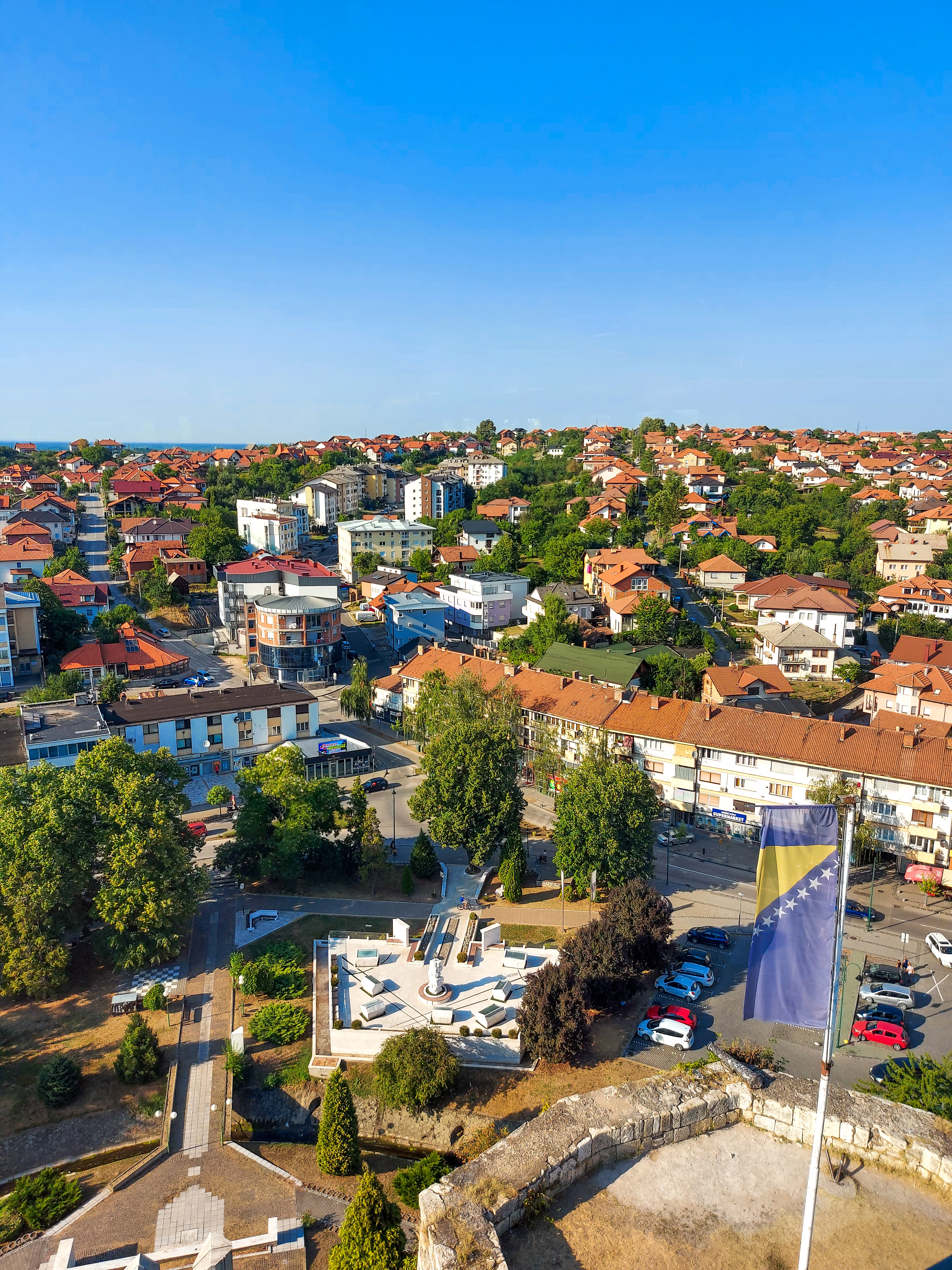
- A view of Gradačac from the Gradačac Castle

- Coat of arms

- Location of Gradačac within Bosnia and Herzegovina.

- Location of Gradačac
- Coordinates: 44°52′44″N 18°25′33″E
- Country: Bosnia and Herzegovina
- Entity: Federation of Bosnia and Herzegovina
- Canton: Tuzla

Government
  - Mayor: Hajrudin Mehanović (SDA)

Area
  - City: 218 km^{2} (84 sq mi)

Population (2013. census)
  - City: 39,340
  - Density: 192/km^{2} (500/sq mi)
  - Urban: 12,764
- Time zone: UTC+1 (CET)
  - Summer (DST): UTC+2 (CEST)
- Area code: +387 35
- Website: www.gradacac.ba

Gradačac (pronounced [gradǎt͡ʃat͡s]) is a city located in the Tuzla Canton of the Federation of Bosnia and Herzegovina, an entity of Bosnia and Herzegovina. It is situated in the northeastern part of Bosnia and Herzegovina, roughly 40 km (25 mi) south of the Sava river. As of 2013, it has a population of 39,340 inhabitants. The city is well known for its castle.

== Settlements ==
• Avramovina • Biberovo Polje • Blaževac • Cetnica • Donja Međiđa • Donja Tramošnica • Donje Krečane • Donje Ledenice • Donji Lukavac • Donji Skugrić • Gajevi • Gornja Međiđa • Gornja Tramošnica • Gornje Krečane • Gornje Ledenice • Gornji Lukavac • Gradačac • Hrgovi Donji • Jasenica • Jelovče Selo • Kerep • Krčevljani • Mionica • Novalići • Porebrice • Rajska • Samarevac • Sibovac • Srnice Donje • Srnice Gornje • Tolisa • Turić • Vida • Vučkovci • Zelinja Donja • Zelinja Gornja i Zelinja Srednja.

== Demographics ==
=== Population ===
Population of settlements – Gradačac municipality
	Settlement	1971.	1981.	1991.	2013.
	Total	48,384	54,281	56,581	41,836
1	Biberovo Polje			815	730
2	Donja Međiđa			1,475	1,353
3	Donje Ledenice			1,638	604
4	Donji Lukavac			803	836
5	Gornja Međiđa			1,447	1,310
6	Gornje Ledenice			462	475
7	Gornji Lukavac			1,259	1,384
8	Gradačac	7,606	10,661	12,868	12,764
9	Hrgovi Donji			671	349
10	Jasenica			579	223
11	Jelovče Selo			1,315	1,369
12	Kerep			891	908
13	Mionica			5,485	5,483
14	Novalići			478	444
15	Rajska			1,039	956
16	Sibovac			921	1,009
17	Srnice Donje			989	404
18	Srnice Gornje			911	818
19	Turić			1,610	221
20	Vida			1,651	1,926
21	Vučkovci			2,657	2,679
22	Zelinja Donja			1,620	1,551
23	Zelinja Srednja			1,295	1,253

=== Ethnic composition ===
Ethnic composition – Gradačac town
	2013.	1991.	1981.	1971.
Total	12,764 (100,0%)	12,868 (100,0%)	10,661 (100,0%)	7,606 (100,0%)
Bosniaks	11,811 (92,53%)	9,454 (73,47%)	7,758 (72,77%)	6,121 (80,48%)
Others	483 (3,784%)	362 (2,813%)	76 (0,713%)	59 (0,776%)
Croats	227 (1,778%)	681 (5,292%)	563 (5,281%)	452 (5,943%)
Serbs	111 (0,870%)	1,348 (10,48%)	980 (9,192%)	730 (9,598%)
Roma	106 (0,830%)		1 (0,009%)	
Albanians	23 (0,180%)		25 (0,234%)	14 (0,184%)
Macedonians	2 (0,016%)		1 (0,009%)	2 (0,026%)
Slovenes	1 (0,008%)		4 (0,038%)	5 (0,066%)
Yugoslavs		1 023 (7,950%)	1 231 (11,55%)	207 (2,722%)
Montenegrins			16 (0,150%)	13 (0,171%)
Hungarians			6 (0,056%)	3 (0,039%)

Ethnic composition – Gradačac municipality
	2013.	1991.	1981.	1971.
Total	41,836 (100,0%)	56,581 (100,0%)	54,281 (100,0%)	48,384 (100,0%)
Bosniaks	37,130 (94,38%)	33,856 (59,84%)	31,219 (57,51%)	26,905 (55,61%)
Croats	918 (2,334%)	8,613 (15,22%)	9,011 (16,60%)	8,447 (17,46%)
Others	789 (2,006%)	1,455 (2,572%)	222 (0,409%)	193 (0,399%)
Serbs	345 (0,877%)	11,221 (19,83%)	11,727 (21,60%)	12,455 (25,74%)
Roma	127 (0,323%)		1 (0,002%)	
Albanians	23 (0,058%)		35 (0,064%)	16 (0,033%)
Yugoslavs	4 (0,010%)	1 436 (2,538%)	2 010 (3,703%)	321 (0,663%)
Macedonians	3 (0,008%)		10 (0,018%)	5 (0,010%)
Slovenes	1 (0,003%)		8 (0,015%)	10 (0,021%)
Montenegrins			29 (0,053%)	28 (0,058%)
Hungarians			9 (0,017%)	4 (0,008%)

== History ==
The župa of Gradačac was first mentioned in 1302, while the town's first written mention dates from 1465 (also as Gračac). The town became part of the Ottoman Empire in 1512, its nahija (municipality) was first recorded in the defter of 1533, while its kadiluk (county) was recorded in 1634.

In 1701, the settlement was given the status of a palanka (city), and it became the headquarters of a military captaincy in 1710. The captains of the Gradaščević family led the development of the city, and the most famous of them, Husein-kapetan Gradaščević or Zmaj od Bosne ("Dragon of Bosnia"), led an uprising that raised to arms most of the Bosnian captains in 1831.

The town has a fort with 18-meter high walls built between 1765 and 1821, and a 22-meter high watchtower built in 1824 by Husein-kapetan Gradaščević on foundations made originally by the Romans. Husejnija Mosque was built in 1826.

From 1929 to 1939, Gradačac was part of the Vrbas Banovina and from 1939 to 1941 of the Banovina of Croatia within the Kingdom of Yugoslavia.

In 1964 and 1967, Gradačac suffered serious floods, which led to significant interventions in the local streams in the 1970s.

It was severely bombed during the Bosnian War 1992–1995. It is located near the narrow northern Brčko corridor that connects two major portions of the Bosnian Serb entity Republika Srpska. Gradačac became part of the Tuzla Canton in the Federation of Bosnia and Herzegovina after the war.

== Thermal springs ==
The first spa facility, Ilidža Spa Treatment Centre was built on the thermal springs in Gradačac in 1882. The water temperature is 29.30˚C found at depth of 286 meters. In the area nearby are also two lakes Hazna and Vidara. Both lakes were built as part of project for protecting city from floods who took final stroke in 1964 and 1967, when the city's industrial part was underwater due to extensive floods.

== Economy ==
The most important industries in Gradačac are textile, chemical, mechanical and food processing. Gradačac is the place where the traditional international fair for plums "Sajam šljive" (also known as "Šljivarevo") is held. In August 2015, the traditional international plum fair "Sajam šljive" was held. It was attended by 250 presenters from Bosnia & Herzegovina, Croatia, Serbia, Slovenia, Germany, Turkey and Hungary. One of the more notable local firms is "Kula", who was founded in 1960 as a small local factory producing clothing. Today, Kula is modern and respective company in Eastern Europe with 700 employees and annual production of 300.000 pieces. Kula visits fashion fairs in country and Europe. Kula's models were seen in fashion fairs in Brussel, Leipzig, Düsseldorf and Brno.

== Education ==
In the municipality there are two high schools, seven elementary and 14 regional schools.

== Sport ==
- NK Zvijezda Gradačac
- KK Gradacac
- KIK Zmaj Gradačac

== Notable people ==
- Ahmed Muradbegović, writer
- Ana Šimić, high jumper
- Dario Damjanović, footballer
- Ervin Sejdic, researcher
- Hasan Kikić, poet
- Husein Kavazović, Grand Mufti of Bosnia and Herzegovina (2012-)
- Husein Gradaščević, nobleman
- Ivona Brandić, computer scientist
- Julijana Matanović, writer
- Meliha Smajlović, volleyball player
- Mustafa Imamović, historian
- Stjepan Šiber, general

== Twin towns – sister cities ==
Gradačac is twinned with:

- Düren, Germany
- Sivas, Turkey
- Stryi, Ukraine

== Gallery ==
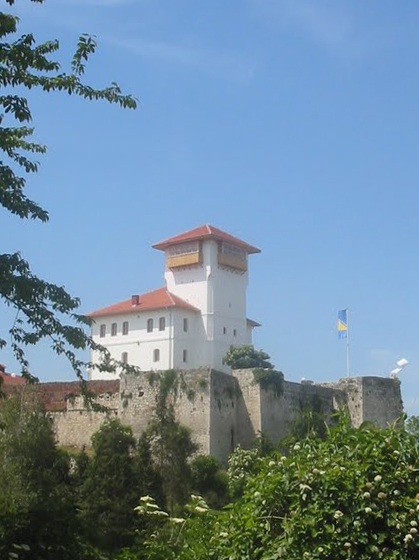
Castle of Gradačac

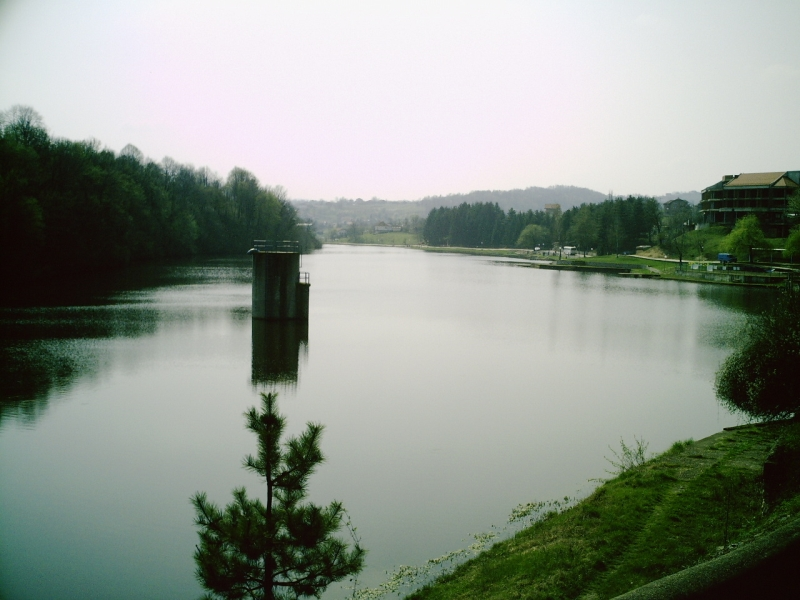
Hazna Lake

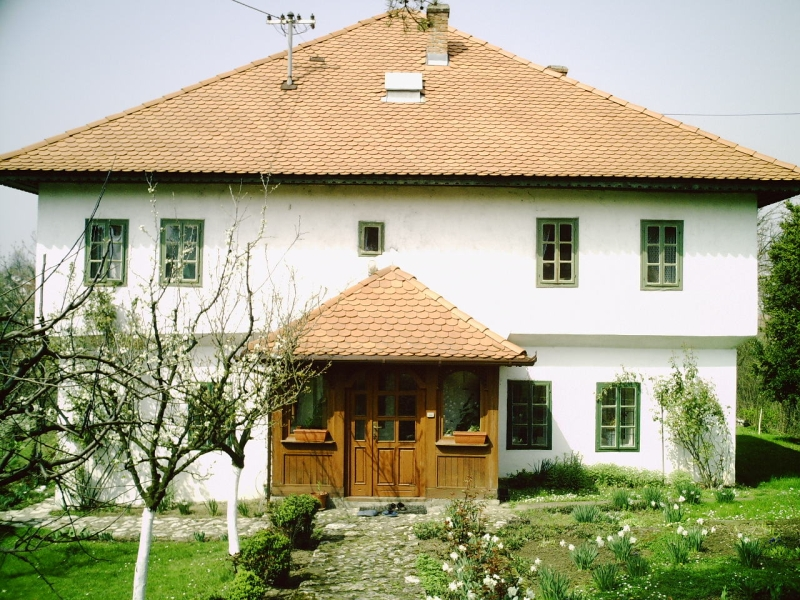
Birth house of Captain Husein Gradaščević

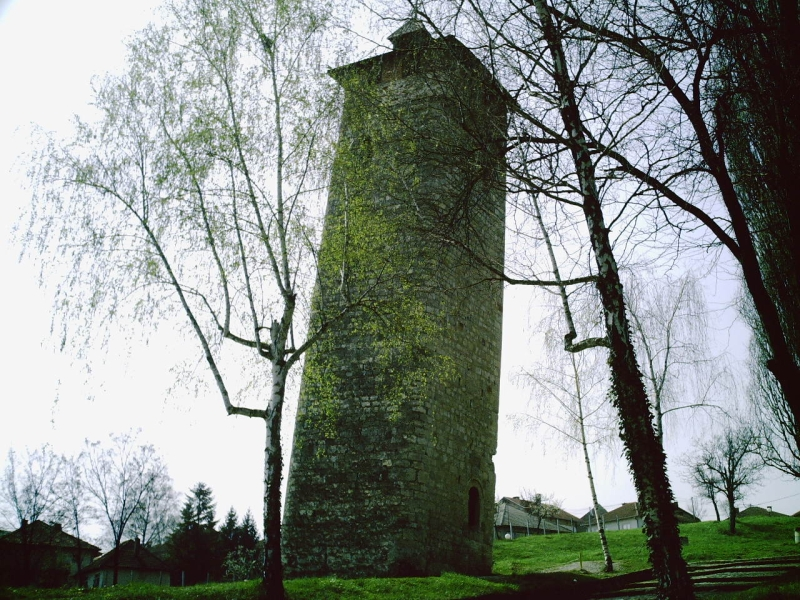
Old Clock Tower

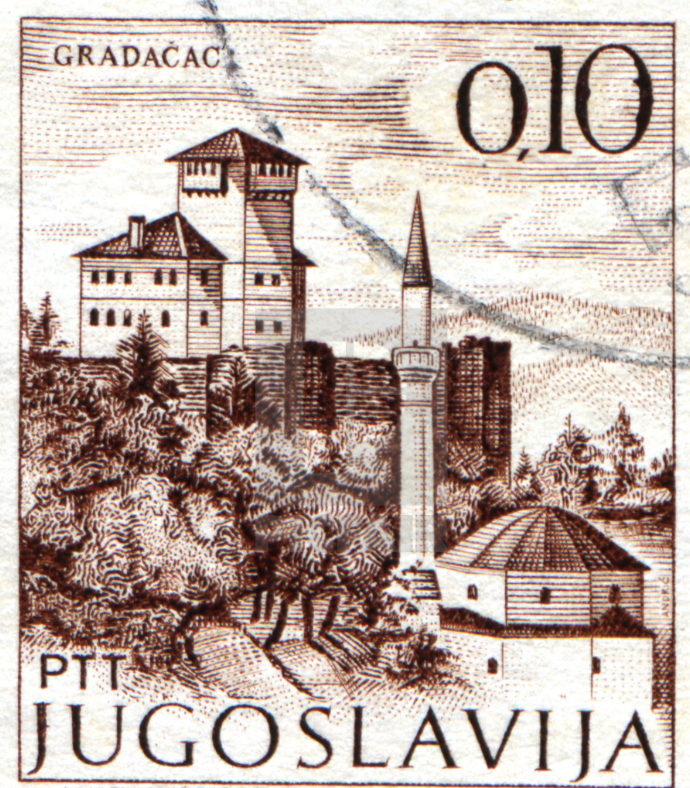
A Yugoslav postage stamp depicting Gradačac with its Gradačac castle and the Husejnija Mosque

== See also ==
- Gradačac Castle
