= Skroze =

- Village
- Location within Bosnia and Herzegovina
- Coordinates: 44.4380319°N 18.1506064°E
- Country: Bosnia and Herzegovina
- Entity: Federation of Bosnia and Herzegovina
- Canton: Zenica-Doboj
- Municipality: Zavidovići

Area
  - Total: 0.93 sq mi (2.40 km^{2})

Population (2013)
  - Total: 382
  - Density: 412/sq mi (159/km^{2})
- Time zone: UTC+1 (CET)
  - Summer (DST): UTC+2 (CEST)

Skroze is a village in the municipality of Zavidovići, Bosnia and Herzegovina. With a population of 382 people (2013 census), the village is home to a historic watermill that was damaged during floods.

== Etymology ==
Skroze's name is derived from the South Slavic word "skrȏz" that means through or completely.

== Geography ==
Skroze's name shares similarities with the South Slavic word "skrȏz" that means through or completely.

== History ==
Skroze faced significant damage due to the floods in Bosnia. According to zdici.info, the budget for restoration was insufficient for all the necessary reconstruction. In response, residents of Skroze formed a committee to restore a historic watermill that had operated during the Second World War. By late 2015, citizens raised nearly 5,000 KM for the initial phase of restorations.

=== Recent years ===
On October 6, 2017, a hay fire was ignited by an unidentified person. Additionally, residents have raised concerns regarding the damage caused by several fires over the past few years in Skroze. Several criminal incidents have been reported in Skroze during the 2020s, including suspected narcotics possession and robbery. In January 2025, Oslobođenje reported that a plot in Skroze was vandalized, with many raspberry plants being cut down.

== Demographics ==
According to the 2013 census, its population was 382.

Ethnicity in 2013
Ethnicity	Number	Percentage
Bosniaks	377	98.7%
other/undeclared	5	1.3%
Total	382	100%
