= Gornji Lukavac =

Gornji Lukavac may refer to the following places:

- Gornji Lukavac, Gradačac
- Gornji Lukavac, Nevesinje

== See also ==
- Lukavac Gornji, Bosnia and Herzegovina
