= Džebe =

- Village
- Location within Bosnia and Herzegovina
- Coordinates: 44.4541399°N 18.1387635°E
- Country: Bosnia and Herzegovina
- Entity: Federation of Bosnia and Herzegovina
- Canton: Zenica-Doboj
- Municipality: Zavidovići

Area
  - Total: 0.32 sq mi (0.83 km^{2})

Population (2013)
  - Total: 214
  - Density: 670/sq mi (260/km^{2})
- Time zone: UTC+1 (CET)
  - Summer (DST): UTC+2 (CEST)

Džebe is a village in the municipality of Zavidovići, Bosnia and Herzegovina.

== Demographics ==
According to the 2013 census, its population was 214.

Ethnicity in 2013
Ethnicity	Number	Percentage
Bosniaks	200	93.5%
Croats	12	5.6%
Serbs	1	0.5%
other/undeclared	1	0.5%
Total	214	100%
