= Gornji Junuzovići =

- Village
- Location within Bosnia and Herzegovina
- Coordinates: 44.4738344°N 18.1988771°E
- Country: Bosnia and Herzegovina
- Entity: Federation of Bosnia and Herzegovina
- Canton: Zenica-Doboj
- Municipality: Zavidovići

Area
  - Total: 2.03 sq mi (5.25 km^{2})

Population (2013)
  - Total: 581
  - Density: 287/sq mi (111/km^{2})
- Time zone: UTC+1 (CET)
  - Summer (DST): UTC+2 (CEST)

Gornji Junuzovići is a village in the municipality of Zavidovići, Bosnia and Herzegovina.

== Demographics ==
According to the 2013 census, its population was 581.

Ethnicity in 2013
Ethnicity	Number	Percentage
Bosniaks	571	98.3%
Croats	1	0.2%
other/undeclared	9	1.5%
Total	581	100%
