= Blaževac =

Blaževac Блажевац (Serbian)
- Village (Selo)
- Location within Bosnia and Herzegovina
- Coordinates: 44°50′54″N 18°35′15″E
- Country: Bosnia and Herzegovina
- Entity: Republika Srpska; Federation of Bosnia and Herzegovina
- Region Canton: Bijeljina; Tuzla
- Municipality: Pelagićevo; Gradačac

Area
  - Total: 6.85 sq mi (17.74 km^{2})

Population (2013)
  - Total: 349
  - Density: 51.0/sq mi (19.7/km^{2})
- Time zone: UTC+1 (CET)
  - Summer (DST): UTC+2 (CEST)

Blaževac (Serbian Cyrillic: Блажевац) is a village in the municipalities of Pelagićevo (Republika Srpska) and Gradačac, Bosnia and Herzegovina.

== Demographics ==
According to the 2013 census, its population was 349, with 340 of them living in the Pelagićevo part and 5 in the Gradačac part.

Ethnicity in 2013
Ethnicity	Number	Percentage
Serbs	281	80.5%
Croats	65	18.6%
Bosniaks	2	0.6%
other/undeclared	1	0.3%
Total	349	100%
