= Dištica =

- Village
- Location within Bosnia and Herzegovina
- Coordinates: 44.3033509°N 18.3856123°E
- Country: Bosnia and Herzegovina
- Entity: Federation of Bosnia and Herzegovina
- Canton: Zenica-Doboj
- Municipality: Zavidovići

Area
  - Total: 5.42 sq mi (14.04 km^{2})

Population (2013)
  - Total: 68
  - Density: 13/sq mi (4.8/km^{2})
- Time zone: UTC+1 (CET)
  - Summer (DST): UTC+2 (CEST)

Dištica is a village in the municipality of Zavidovići, Bosnia and Herzegovina.

== Demographics ==
According to the 2013 census, its population was 68.

Ethnicity in 2013
Ethnicity	Number	Percentage
Croats	61	89.7%
Bosniaks	4	5.9%
Serbs	1	1.5%
other/undeclared	2	2.9%
Total	68	100%
