= Mustajbašići =

- Village
- Location within Bosnia and Herzegovina
- Coordinates: 44.4292326°N 18.1867195°E
- Country: Bosnia and Herzegovina
- Entity: Federation of Bosnia and Herzegovina
- Canton: Zenica-Doboj
- Municipality: Zavidovići

Area
  - Total: 2.92 sq mi (7.57 km^{2})

Population (2013)
  - Total: 1,385
  - Density: 474/sq mi (183/km^{2})
- Time zone: UTC+1 (CET)
  - Summer (DST): UTC+2 (CEST)

Mustajbašići is a village in the municipality of Zavidovići, Bosnia and Herzegovina.

== Demographics ==
According to the 2013 census, its population was 1,385.

Ethnicity in 2013
Ethnicity	Number	Percentage
Bosniaks	1,375	99.3%
Croats	2	0.1%
other/undeclared	8	0.6%
Total	1,385	100%
