= World Bosniak Congress =

World Bosniak Congress (WBC, Bosnian: Svjetski bošnjački kongres) is a global Bosniak organization. It was founded on 29 December 2012.

It was founded by Ferid Muhić, president of Bosniak Academy of Sciences and Arts, Mustafa Cerić, former Grand Mufti of Bosnia and Herzegovina and Muhamed Filipović, prominent Bosniak academician. The Congress has a strong presence from Sandžak, a Muslim Bosniak-majority region on the Serbia-Montenegro frontier.

WBC is determined as a part of Bosnian revival after the Bosnian War for independence and ethnic cleansing.
