= Bajvati =

- Village
- Location within Bosnia and Herzegovina
- Coordinates: 44.3996°N 18.2192°E
- Country: Bosnia and Herzegovina
- Entity: Federation of Bosnia and Herzegovina
- Canton: Zenica-Doboj
- Municipality: Zavidovići

Area
  - Total: 2.39 sq mi (6.18 km^{2})

Population (2013)
  - Total: 1,154
  - Density: 484/sq mi (187/km^{2})
- Time zone: UTC+1 (CET)
  - Summer (DST): UTC+2 (CEST)

Bajvati is a village in the municipality of Zavidovići, Bosnia and Herzegovina.

== Demographics ==
According to the 2013 census, its population was 1,154.

Ethnicity in 2013
Ethnicity	Number	Percentage
Bosniaks	1,150	99.7%
Croats	0	0.0%
Serbs	0	0.0%
other/undeclared	4	0.3%
Total	1,154	100%
