= Perovići, Zavidovići =

Perovići Перовићи
- Village
- Location within Bosnia and Herzegovina
- Coordinates: 44.4753013°N 18.2489534°E
- Country: Bosnia and Herzegovina
- Entity: Federation of Bosnia and Herzegovina
- Canton: Zenica-Doboj
- Municipality: Zavidovići

Area
  - Total: 5.11 sq mi (13.23 km^{2})

Population (2013)
  - Total: 1,155
  - Density: 226.1/sq mi (87.30/km^{2})
- Time zone: UTC+1 (CET)
  - Summer (DST): UTC+2 (CEST)

Perovići is a village in the municipality of Zavidovići, Bosnia and Herzegovina.

== Demographics ==
According to the 2013 census, its population was 1,155.

Ethnicity in 2013
Ethnicity	Number	Percentage
Bosniaks	1,132	98.0%
Serbs	6	0.5%
other/undeclared	17	1.5%
Total	1,155	100%
