= Vukovine =

- Village
- Location within Bosnia and Herzegovina
- Coordinates: 44.3867022°N 18.3865649°E
- Country: Bosnia and Herzegovina
- Entity: Federation of Bosnia and Herzegovina
- Canton: Zenica-Doboj
- Municipality: Zavidovići

Area
  - Total: 1.07 sq mi (2.77 km^{2})

Population (2013)
  - Total: 138
  - Density: 129/sq mi (49.8/km^{2})
- Time zone: UTC+1 (CET)
  - Summer (DST): UTC+2 (CEST)

Vukovine is a village in the municipality of Zavidovići, Bosnia and Herzegovina.

== Demographics ==
According to the 2013 census, its population was 138.

Ethnicity in 2013
Ethnicity	Number	Percentage
Bosniaks	131	94.4%
Serbs	3	2.2%
other/undeclared	4	2.9%
Total	138	100%
