= Vukmanovići =

- Village
- Location within Bosnia and Herzegovina
- Coordinates: 44.386599°N 18.1604861°E
- Country: Bosnia and Herzegovina
- Entity: Federation of Bosnia and Herzegovina
- Canton: Zenica-Doboj
- Municipality: Zavidovići

Area
  - Total: 2.20 sq mi (5.69 km^{2})

Population (2013)
  - Total: 30
  - Density: 14/sq mi (5.3/km^{2})
- Time zone: UTC+1 (CET)
  - Summer (DST): UTC+2 (CEST)

Vukmanovići is a village in the municipality of Zavidovići, Bosnia and Herzegovina.

== Demographics ==
According to the 2013 census, its population was 30, all Bosniaks.
