= Potkleče =

- Village
- Location within Bosnia and Herzegovina
- Coordinates: 44.4285872°N 18.1328086°E
- Country: Bosnia and Herzegovina
- Entity: Federation of Bosnia and Herzegovina
- Canton: Zenica-Doboj
- Municipality: Zavidovići

Area
  - Total: 1.15 sq mi (2.97 km^{2})

Population (2013)
  - Total: 1,685
  - Density: 1,470/sq mi (567/km^{2})
- Time zone: UTC+1 (CET)
  - Summer (DST): UTC+2 (CEST)

Potkleče is a village in the municipality of Zavidovići, Bosnia and Herzegovina.

== Demographics ==
According to the 2013 census, its population was 1,685.

Ethnicity in 2013
Ethnicity	Number	Percentage
Bosniaks	1,616	95.9%
Croats	4	0.2%
Serbs	4	0.2%
other/undeclared	61	3.6%
Total	1,685	100%
