= Crnjevo =

- Village
- Location within Bosnia and Herzegovina
- Coordinates: 44.3943°N 18.4006°E
- Country: Bosnia and Herzegovina
- Entity: Federation of Bosnia and Herzegovina
- Canton: Zenica-Doboj
- Municipality: Zavidovići

Area
  - Total: 3.02 sq mi (7.83 km^{2})

Population (2013)
  - Total: 303
  - Density: 100/sq mi (38.7/km^{2})
- Time zone: UTC+1 (CET)
  - Summer (DST): UTC+2 (CEST)

Crnjevo is a village in the municipality of Zavidovići, Bosnia and Herzegovina.

== Demographics ==
According to the 2013 census, its population was 303.

Ethnicity in 2013
Ethnicity	Number	Percentage
Bosniaks	290	95.7%
other/undeclared	13	4.3%
Total	303	100%
