= Samarevac =

Samarevac Самаревац
- Village (Selo)
- Location within Bosnia and Herzegovina
- Coordinates: 44°54′N 18°31′E
- Country: Bosnia and Herzegovina
- Entity: Republika Srpska; Federation of Bosnia and Herzegovina
- Region Canton: Bijeljina; Tuzla
- Municipality: Pelagićevo; Gradačac

Area
  - Total: 1.58 sq mi (4.10 km^{2})

Population (2013)
  - Total: 136
  - Density: 85.9/sq mi (33.2/km^{2})
- Time zone: UTC+1 (CET)
  - Summer (DST): UTC+2 (CEST)

Samarevac (Serbian Cyrillic: Самаревац) is a village in the municipalities of Pelagićevo (Republika Srpska) and Gradačac, Bosnia and Herzegovina.

== Demographics ==
According to the 2013 census, its population was 136, with all of them living in the Pelagićevo part and thus none in the Gradačac part.

Ethnicity in 2013
Ethnicity	Number	Percentage
Serbs	132	97.1%
Croats	3	2.2%
other/undeclared	1	0.7%
Total	136	100%
