= Donja Lovnica, Zavidovići =

Donja Lovnica Доња Ловница
- Village
- Location within Bosnia and Herzegovina
- Coordinates: 44.4107898°N 18.1431244°E
- Country: Bosnia and Herzegovina
- Entity: Federation of Bosnia and Herzegovina
- Canton: Zenica-Doboj
- Municipality: Zavidovići

Area
  - Total: 2.92 sq mi (7.55 km^{2})

Population (2013)
  - Total: 2,070
  - Density: 710/sq mi (274/km^{2})
- Time zone: UTC+1 (CET)
  - Summer (DST): UTC+2 (CEST)

Donja Lovnica is a village in the municipality of Zavidovići, Bosnia and Herzegovina.

== Demographics ==
According to the 2013 census, its population was 2,070.

Ethnicity in 2013
Ethnicity	Number	Percentage
Bosniaks	1,864	90.0%
Croats	40	1.9%
Serbs	19	0.9%
other/undeclared	147	7.1%
Total	2,070	100%
