= Svinjašnica =

- Village
- Location within Bosnia and Herzegovina
- Coordinates: 44.4504138°N 18.2871655°E
- Country: Bosnia and Herzegovina
- Entity: Federation of Bosnia and Herzegovina
- Canton: Zenica-Doboj
- Municipality: Zavidovići

Area
  - Total: 3.49 sq mi (9.04 km^{2})

Population (2013)
  - Total: 62
  - Density: 18/sq mi (6.9/km^{2})
- Time zone: UTC+1 (CET)
  - Summer (DST): UTC+2 (CEST)

Svinjašnica is a village in the municipality of Zavidovići, Bosnia and Herzegovina.

== Demographics ==
According to the 2013 census, its population was 62.

Ethnicity in 2013
Ethnicity	Number	Percentage
Bosniaks	60	96.8%
Serbs	2	3.2%
Total	62	100%
