= Predražići =

- Village
- Location within Bosnia and Herzegovina
- Coordinates: 44.3292887°N 18.4111265°E
- Country: Bosnia and Herzegovina
- Entity: Federation of Bosnia and Herzegovina
- Canton: Zenica-Doboj
- Municipality: Zavidovići

Area
  - Total: 4.51 sq mi (11.69 km^{2})

Population (2013)
  - Total: 228
  - Density: 50.5/sq mi (19.5/km^{2})
- Time zone: UTC+1 (CET)
  - Summer (DST): UTC+2 (CEST)

Predražići is a village in the municipality of Zavidovići, Bosnia and Herzegovina.

== Demographics ==
According to the 2013 census, its population was 228.

Ethnicity in 2013
Ethnicity	Number	Percentage
Bosniaks	126	55.3%
Croats	56	24.6%
Serbs	8	3.5%
other/undeclared	38	16.7%
Total	228	100%
