= Orlovo Polje =

Orlovo Polje Орлово Поље (Serbian)
- Village (Selo)
- Location within Bosnia and Herzegovina
- Coordinates: 44°56′27″N 18°32′32″E
- Country: Bosnia and Herzegovina
- Municipality: Pelagićevo
- Time zone: UTC+1 (CET)
  - Summer (DST): UTC+2 (CEST)

Orlovo Polje (Serbian Cyrillic: Орлово Поље) is a village in the municipality of Pelagićevo, Bosnia and Herzegovina.
