= Turić =

Turić Турић
- City
- Location within Bosnia and Herzegovina
- Coordinates: 44°52′48″N 18°31′12″E
- Country: Bosnia and Herzegovina
- Entity: Republika Srpska; Federation of Bosnia and Herzegovina
- Region Canton: Bijeljina; Tuzla
- Municipality: Pelagićevo; Gradačac

Area
  - Total: 8.70 sq mi (22.52 km^{2})

Population (2013)
  - Total: 626
  - Density: 72.0/sq mi (27.8/km^{2})
- Time zone: UTC+1 (CET)
  - Summer (DST): UTC+2 (CEST)

Turić (Cyrillic: Турић) is a village in the municipalities of Pelagićevo (Republika Srpska) and Gradačac, Bosnia and Herzegovina.

== Demographics ==
According to the 2013 census, its population was 626, with 405 of them living in the Pelagićevo part and 221 in the Gradačac part.

Ethnicity in 2013
Ethnicity	Number	Percentage
Croats	530	84.7%
Bosniaks	75	12.0%
Serbs	17	2.7%
other/undeclared	4	0.6%
Total	626	100%
