= Husein Kavazović =

6th Grand Mufti of Bosnia and Herzegovina from 2012 to 2026

Effendi Husein Kavazović
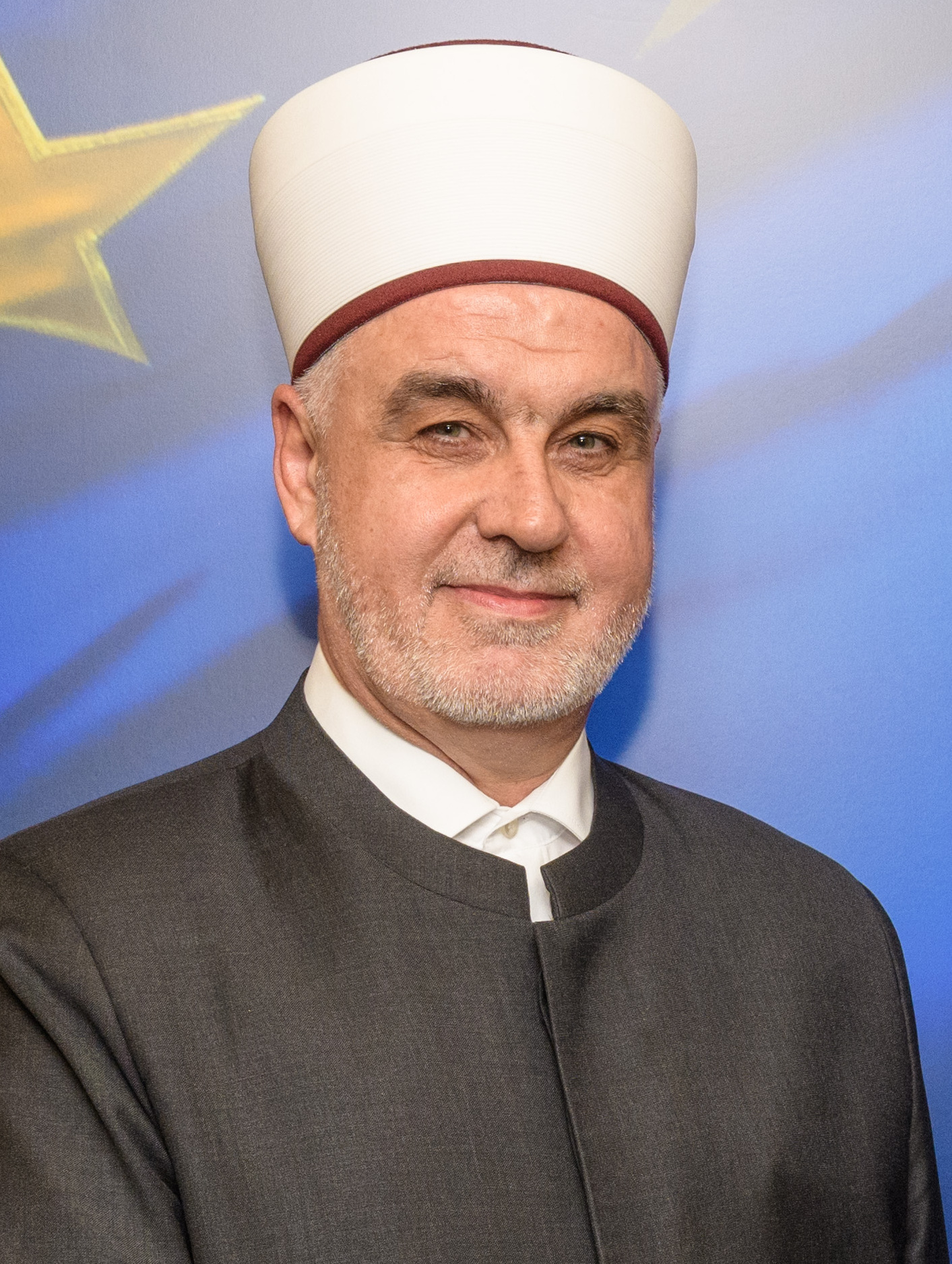
- Kavazović in 2017
- Title: 6th Grand Mufti of Bosnia and Herzegovina

Personal life
- Born: 3 July 1964 (age 62) Jelovče Selo, PR Bosnia and Herzegovina, FPR Yugoslavia
- Education: Al-Azhar University; University of Sarajevo

Religious life
- Religion: Islam
- Denomination: Sunni
- School: Hanafi

Muslim leader
- Period in office: 19 November 2012 – 15 November 2026
- Predecessor: Mustafa Cerić
- Successor: Nedžad Grabus
- Previous post: Mufti of Tuzla

Husein ef. Kavazović (born 3 July 1964) is a Bosnian imam and scholar who served as the Grand Mufti of Bosnia and Herzegovina from 2012 to 2026.

== Biography ==
Son of Hasan and Saima Kavazović, Husein attended primary schools in Gradačac and then enrolled at the Gazi Husrev Beg's Madrasa in Sarajevo, where he graduated in 1983. He left Yugoslavia to study Islamic law from 1985 to 1990 at the Al-Azhar University in Cairo, then came back to defend his master's thesis at the Faculty of Islamic Studies at the University of Sarajevo, in the field of Sharia law.

Kavazović then worked as imam, khatib and muallim (lecturer) in a mosque in Srebrenik and Gradačac, before becoming the youngest mufti at 27, in Bosnia and Herzegovina, serving as mufti of Tuzla from 1993 to 2012. In the early 1990s, he was also elected member of the Council of the Islamic Community in Bosnia and Herzegovina.

In 2012, the Islamic Community elected Kavazović to succeed Mustafa Cerić as the Grand Mufti of Bosnia and Herzegovina; at the vote in the Gazi Husrev-beg Mosque, he received 240 of 382 preferences. In his election program, Kavazović had pushed inter alia for co-operation with other religious communities and a wider "incorporation of women into the work of the Islamic religious community".

Under an agreement, Kavazović was suggested to also serve as Grand Mufti of Hungary. During his mandate as Grand Mufti, mosques were opened in Ljubljana and Sisak. He was re-elected as Grand Mufti to another seven-year term in October 2019. Following the end of his second term, Kavazović was succeeded in November 2026 by Nedžad Grabus.

Kavazović speaks Bosnian, Arabic and English.

== Threats ==
Kavazović has been attacked and threatened multiple times, together with other Bosnian Muslim officials, in the Bosnian language edition of the ISIS magazine, Rumiyah.

Religious titles
Preceded by Mustafa Cerić	6th Grand Mufti of Bosnia and Herzegovina; 2012–2026	Succeeded by Nedžad Grabus
