= Donji Skugrić =

Donji Skugrić Доњи Скугрић
- Village
- Location within Bosnia and Herzegovina
- Coordinates: 44°55′28″N 18°20′30″E
- Country: Bosnia and Herzegovina
- Entity: Republika Srpska; Federation of Bosnia and Herzegovina
- Region Canton: Doboj; Tuzla
- Municipality: Modriča; Gradačac

Area
  - Total: 7.63 sq mi (19.76 km^{2})

Population (2013)
  - Total: 991
  - Density: 130/sq mi (50.2/km^{2})
- Time zone: UTC+1 (CET)
  - Summer (DST): UTC+2 (CEST)

Donji Skugrić (Serbian: Доњи Скугрић) is a village in the municipalities of Modriča (Republika Srpska) and Gradačac, Bosnia and Herzegovina. Donji means lower, so there is an upper one as well, Skugrić Gornji.

== Demographics ==
According to the 2013 census, its population was 991, with 937 of them living in the Modriča part and 54 in the Gradačac part.

Ethnicity in 2013
Ethnicity	Number	Percentage
Serbs	932	94.0%
Bosniaks	40	4.0%
Croats	6	0.6%
other/undeclared	13	1.3%
Total	991	100%
