= Donja Međiđa =

Donja Mediđa
- Village
- Location within Bosnia and Herzegovina
- Coordinates: 44°48′09″N 18°24′12″E
- Country: Bosnia and Herzegovina
- Entity: Federation of Bosnia and Herzegovina
- Canton: Tuzla
- Municipality: Gradačac

Area
  - Total: 3.76 sq mi (9.74 km^{2})

Population (2013)
  - Total: 1,353
  - Density: 360/sq mi (139/km^{2})
- Time zone: UTC+1 (CET)
  - Summer (DST): UTC+2 (CEST)

Donja Međiđa is a village in the municipality of Gradačac, Bosnia and Herzegovina.

== Demographics ==
According to the 2013 census, its population was 1,353.

Ethnicity in 2013
Ethnicity	Number	Percentage
Bosniaks	1,336	98.7%
Croats	1	0.1%
other/undeclared	16	1.2%
Total	1,353	100%
