= Kerep =

- Village
- Location within Bosnia and Herzegovina
- Coordinates: 44°49′N 18°33′E
- Country: Bosnia and Herzegovina
- Entity: Federation of Bosnia and Herzegovina
- Canton: Tuzla
- Municipality: Gradačac

Area
  - Total: 2.06 sq mi (5.33 km^{2})

Population (2013)
  - Total: 908
  - Density: 441/sq mi (170/km^{2})
- Time zone: UTC+1 (CET)
  - Summer (DST): UTC+2 (CEST)

Kerep is a village in the municipality of Gradačac, Bosnia and Herzegovina.

== Demographics ==
According to the 2013 census, its population was 908.

Ethnicity in 2013
Ethnicity	Number	Percentage
Bosniaks	896	98.7%
Serbs	6	0.7%
other/undeclared	6	0.7%
Total	908	100%
