= Srnice Gornje =

- Village
- Location within Bosnia and Herzegovina
- Coordinates: 44°47′N 18°27′E
- Country: Bosnia and Herzegovina
- Entity: Federation of Bosnia and Herzegovina
- Canton: Tuzla
- Municipality: Gradačac

Area
  - Total: 1.75 sq mi (4.53 km^{2})

Population (2013)
  - Total: 818
  - Density: 468/sq mi (181/km^{2})
- Time zone: UTC+1 (CET)
  - Summer (DST): UTC+2 (CEST)

Srnice Gornje is a village in the municipality of Gradačac, Bosnia and Herzegovina.

== Demographics ==
According to the 2013 census, its population was 818.

Ethnicity in 2013
Ethnicity	Number	Percentage
Bosniaks	808	98.8%
Croats	2	0.2%
Serbs	2	0.2%
other/undeclared	6	0.7%
Total	818	100%
