= Zelinja Gornja =

Zelinja Gornja Зелиња Горња
- Village
- Location within Bosnia and Herzegovina
- Coordinates: 44°49′19″N 18°18′26″E
- Country: Bosnia and Herzegovina
- Entity: Republika Srpska; Federation of Bosnia and Herzegovina
- Region Canton: Doboj; Tuzla
- Municipality: Doboj; Gradačac

Area
  - Total: 6.20 sq mi (16.06 km^{2})

Population (2013)
  - Total: 286
  - Density: 46.1/sq mi (17.8/km^{2})
- Time zone: UTC+1 (CET)
  - Summer (DST): UTC+2 (CEST)

Zelinja Gornja (Cyrillic: Зелиња Горња) is a village in the municipalities of Doboj (Republika Srpska) and Gradačac, Bosnia and Herzegovina.

== Demographics ==
According to the 2013 census, its population was 286, with all of them living in the Doboj part thus none in the Gradačac part.

Ethnicity in 2013
Ethnicity	Number	Percentage
Serbs	285	99.7%
Croats	1	0.3%
Total	286	100%
