= Vida, Gradačac =

Vida
- Village
- Location within Bosnia and Herzegovina
- Coordinates: 44°52′59″N 18°23′07″E
- Country: Bosnia and Herzegovina
- Entity: Federation of Bosnia and Herzegovina
- Canton: Tuzla
- Municipality: Gradačac

Area
  - Total: 2.28 sq mi (5.91 km^{2})

Population (2013)
  - Total: 1,926
  - Density: 844/sq mi (326/km^{2})
- Time zone: UTC+1 (CET)
  - Summer (DST): UTC+2 (CEST)

Vida is a village in the municipality of Gradačac, Bosnia and Herzegovina.

== Demographics ==
According to the 2013 census, its population was 1,926.

Ethnicity in 2013
Ethnicity	Number	Percentage
Bosniaks	1,866	96.9%
Croats	8	0.4%
Serbs	2	0.1%
other/undeclared	50	2.6%
Total	1,926	100%
