= Zelinja Donja =

- Village
- Location within Bosnia and Herzegovina
- Coordinates: 44°49′50″N 18°24′17″E
- Country: Bosnia and Herzegovina
- Entity: Federation of Bosnia and Herzegovina
- Canton: Tuzla
- Municipality: Gradačac

Area
  - Total: 4.29 sq mi (11.11 km^{2})

Population (2013)
  - Total: 1,551
  - Density: 361.6/sq mi (139.6/km^{2})
- Time zone: UTC+1 (CET)
  - Summer (DST): UTC+2 (CEST)

Zelinja Donja is a village in the municipality of Gradačac, Bosnia and Herzegovina.

== Demographics ==
According to the 2013 census, its population was 1,551.

Ethnicity in 2013
Ethnicity	Number	Percentage
Bosniaks	1,533	98.8%
Croats	1	0.1%
other/undeclared	17	1.1%
Total	1,551	100%
