= Nedžad Ibrišimović =

Bosnian writer and sculptor

- Born: 20 October 1940 Sarajevo, Drina Banovina, Yugoslavia
- Died: 15 September 2011 (aged 70) Sarajevo, Bosnia and Herzegovina
- Resting place: Ferhadija Mosque Cemetery in Sarajevo
- Occupation: Writer

Nedžad Ibrišimović (20 October 1940 – 15 September 2011) was a Bosnian writer and sculptor. Between 1993 and 2001, he was a president of the Association of Writers of Bosnia and Herzegovina. He is best known for the novels Ugursuz (1968, Unfortunate) and Vječnik (2005), translated in English as Eternee (2010). In 2011 he was one of the founders of the Bosniak Academy of Sciences and Arts. Ibrišimović's novels have been translated into Czech, Turkish, Albanian, English, French, Spanish, German and Italian.

== Bibliography ==
- Kuća zatvorenih vrata, 1964.
- Najbolji časovničar na svijetu (radio-play), 1967.
- Pisac i njegova kreatura(radio-play), 1968.
- Zlatni most (radio-play), 1968.
- Ugursuz, 1968.
  - Zlá krev, Odeon, Praha, 1976;
  - 3. izd. V. Masleša, Sarajevo, 1982;
  - Ogursezi. Perkhteu Musa Ramadani. Prishtine, Rilindija, 1988;
  - Ugursuz, Svjetlost, Sarajevo, 1984/85;
  - Ugursuz, Svjetlost, Sarajevo, 1991;
  - Ugursuz, Preporod, Sarajevo, 1996;
  - Ugursuz, Svjetlost, Sarajevo, 1997;
  - Ugursuz, Publishing, Sarajevo, 1999;
- Karabeg, 1971.
- Priče, 1972.
- Glas koji je pukao o Egidiju (radio play), 1974.
- Izvor (radio-play), 1977.
- Živo i mrtvo, 1978.
- Zmaj od Bosne, 1980.
- Car si ove hevte, 1980.
- Šamili tubakovi, 1984.
- Nakaza i vila, 1986.
- Drame, 1988.
- Kuća bez vrata i druge priče, 1989.
- Braća i veziri, 1989.
- Dva dana u Al-Akru, 1991.
- Knjiga Adema Kahrimana napisana Nedzadom Ibrišimovićem Bosancem, 1992.
- Zambaci moje duše, 1993.
- Izabrana djela I-X
- Vječnik, 2005.
  - Eternee, 2010;
- El-Hidrova knjiga, 2011.
