= Donja Tramošnica =

Donja Tramošnica Доња Трамошница
- Village
- Location within Bosnia and Herzegovina
- Coordinates: 44°55′34″N 18°31′08″E
- Country: Bosnia and Herzegovina
- Entity: Republika Srpska; Federation of Bosnia and Herzegovina
- Region Canton: Bijeljina; Tuzla
- Municipality: Pelagićevo; Gradačac

Area
  - Total: 5.31 sq mi (13.74 km^{2})

Population (2013)
  - Total: 692
  - Density: 130/sq mi (50.4/km^{2})
- Time zone: UTC+1 (CET)
  - Summer (DST): UTC+2 (CEST)

Donja Tramošnica (Cyrillic: Доња Трамошница) is a village in the municipalities of Pelagićevo (Republika Srpska) and Gradačac, Bosnia and Herzegovina.

== Demographics ==
According to the 2013 census, its population was 692, with 671 of them living in the Pelagićevo part and 21 in the Gradačac part.

Ethnicity in 2013
Ethnicity	Number	Percentage
Croats	681	98.4%
Serbs	3	0.4%
Bosniaks	3	0.4%
other/undeclared	5	0.7%
Total	692	100%
