= Julijana Matanović =

Croatian short story writer and novelist

- Born: 6 April 1959 (age 67); Gradačac, FPR Yugoslavia
- Education: University of Osijek; University of Zagreb
- Occupations: Short story writer, novelist and scholar
- Writing career
- Period: 1986–present
- Website: www.julijana-matanovic.com

Julijana Matanović (born 6 April 1959) is a Bosnian Croat short story writer and novelist. She is also a professor at the University of Zagreb, Faculty of Humanities and Social Sciences, where she teaches contemporary Croatian literature.

== Life ==
She was born in Gradačac, went to primary school in Đurđenovac and then on to high school in Našice, before enrolling at University of Osijek where she earned a degree in Yugoslav languages and literature in 1982. In 1998 she earned her doctorate at the Faculty of Humanities and Social Sciences, University of Zagreb with a thesis called Povijesni roman u hrvatskoj književnosti XX. stoljeća (English: The historical novel in 20th-century Croatian literature).

Her works have been translated into German, Hungarian, Serbian and Slovenian.

== Selected works ==
- Zašto sam vam lagala (1997)
- Bilješka o piscu (2000) ISBN 9789531421089, OCLC 1019247496
- Lijepi običaji (2000)
- Kao da smo otac i kći (2003) ISBN 9789532008517, OCLC 57736760
- Krsto i Lucijan (2003)
- Laura nije samo anegdota (2005)
- Tko se boji lika još (2008) ISBN 9789531208314, OCLC 302231264
- Knjiga od žena, muškaraca, gradova i rastanaka (2009)
