= Klek (mountain) =

- Location within Bosnia and Herzegovina

Highest point
- Elevation: 777 metres (2,549 ft)
- Coordinates: 44°25′21″N 18°11′38″E

Geography
- Location: Bosnia and Herzegovina

Klek is a mountain in municipality of Zavidovići, Bosnia and Herzegovina. It has a length of 7 kilometres (4.3 mi), with beginning from city of Zavidovići to local community of Brezik, to the east. Its highest point is 777 meters. From the north of the mountain, there is a river of Krivaja, which in Zavidovići flows to the river of Bosna.

Klek is popular winter destination for local people. Along with clean air and snow, the mountain has a good view of Zavidovići and surrounding places.

== See also ==
- List of mountains in Bosnia and Herzegovina
