= Mustafa Imamović =

Mustafa Imamović (1941 – 23 January 2017) was a Bosnian historian of state and law, born in Gradačac. He studied and graduated from the law faculty in Belgrade, where he acquired his masters and doctorate. He became a professor of history of state and law at the Faculty of Law in Sarajevo. During his academic career he taught at the law faculty in Belgrade, Novi Sad, Mostar and Rijeka. He also taught at the Department of History at Yale University (New Haven), and at several other universities in the United States.

He is author and coauthor of several university and high school textbooks. In addition, he's published about 350 studies, discussions and articles from the history of political and legal institutions of Bosnia and former Yugoslavia, political and cultural development of the Bosniaks, the various aspects of Jewish history and the general development of civilization. He was the editor and editorial board member of several journals and encyclopedias. So far he has several works translated and published in English, German, Spanish, Albanian, Turkish, Arabic and Persian. He died on 23 January 2017.
