= Donje Krečane =

- Village
- Location within Bosnia and Herzegovina
- Coordinates: 44°52′N 18°23′E
- Country: Bosnia and Herzegovina
- Entity: Federation of Bosnia and Herzegovina
- Canton: Tuzla
- Municipality: Gradačac

Area
  - Total: 0.93 sq mi (2.42 km^{2})

Population (2013)
  - Total: 30
  - Density: 32/sq mi (12/km^{2})
- Time zone: UTC+1 (CET)
  - Summer (DST): UTC+2 (CEST)

Donje Krečane is a village in the municipality of Gradačac, Bosnia and Herzegovina.

== Demographics ==
According to the 2013 census, its population was 30.

Ethnicity in 2013
Ethnicity	Number	Percentage
Bosniaks	27	90.0%
Serbs	2	6.7%
other/undeclared	1	3.3%
Total	30	100%
