= Alija Bešić =

Luxembourgish footballer

Personal information
- Full name: Alija Bešić
- Date of birth: 30 March 1975 (age 51)
- Place of birth: Zavidovići, SFR Yugoslavia
- Position: Goalkeeper

Senior career*
Years	Team	Apps	(Gls)
1994–2004	Union Luxembourg	205	(1)
2004–2006	Swift Hesperange	33	(0)
2006–2008	CS Pétange	48	(0)
2008–2012	CS Fola Esch	73	(0)

International career^{‡}
2000–2004	Luxembourg	28	(0)
- * Club domestic league appearances and goals as of 4 May 2013 ‡ National team caps and goals as of 14 September 2009

Alija Bešić (born 30 March 1975, in Zavidovići, SR Bosnia and Herzegovina) is a retired Luxembourgish professional football player of Bosnian descent.
