= Roncadelle =

Roncadelle Roncadèle
- Comune
- Comune di Roncadelle
- Location within Italy Location within Lombardy
- Coordinates: 45°32′N 10°9′E
- Country: Italy
- Region: Lombardy
- Province: Brescia (BS)
- Frazioni: Mandolossa

Government
  - Mayor: Roberto Groppelli

Area
  - Total: 9 km^{2} (3.5 sq mi)
- Elevation: 158 m (518 ft)

Population (2011)
  - Total: 9,490
  - Density: 1,100/km^{2} (2,700/sq mi)
- Time zone: UTC+1 (CET)
  - Summer (DST): UTC+2 (CEST)
- Postal code: 25030
- Dialing code: 030
- ISTAT code: 017165
- Patron saint: San Bernardino
- Saint day: 20 May
- Website: Official website

Roncadelle (Brescian: Roncadèle) is a comune in the province of Brescia, in Lombardy.

Roncadelle is a medium-sized municipality with a mix of local Italian residents and immigrants, including communities from Pakistan, Romania, and Albania.

The climate is temperate, with warm summers and cold winters. July is usually the hottest month, while January is the coldest.

History: The name "Roncadelle" likely derives from the Latin word "runco", meaning to clear or harvest, reflecting the area's agricultural roots.

== Twin towns ==
Roncadelle is twinned with:

- Zavidovići, Bosnia and Herzegovina
