= Gornja Tramošnica =

Gornja Tramošnica Горња Трамошница
- Village
- Location within Bosnia and Herzegovina
- Coordinates: 44°53′54″N 18°28′33″E
- Country: Bosnia and Herzegovina
- Entity: Republika Srpska; Federation of Bosnia and Herzegovina
- Region Canton: Bijeljina; Tuzla
- Municipality: Pelagićevo; Gradačac

Area
  - Total: 4.58 sq mi (11.87 km^{2})

Population (2013)
  - Total: 515
  - Density: 112/sq mi (43.4/km^{2})
- Time zone: UTC+1 (CET)
  - Summer (DST): UTC+2 (CEST)

Gornja Tramošnica (Cyrillic: Горња Трамошница) is a village in the municipalities of Pelagićevo (Republika Srpska) and Gradačac, Bosnia and Herzegovina.

== Demographics ==
According to the 2013 census, its population was 515, with 450 of them living in the Pelagićevo part and 65 in the Gradačac part.

Ethnicity in 2013
Ethnicity	Number	Percentage
Croats	506	98.3%
Serbs	8	1.6%
other/undeclared	1	0.2%
Total	515	100%
