= Novalići =

- Village
- Location within Bosnia and Herzegovina
- Coordinates: 44°52′19″N 18°22′17″E
- Country: Bosnia and Herzegovina
- Entity: Federation of Bosnia and Herzegovina
- Canton: Tuzla
- Municipality: Gradačac

Area
  - Total: 0.56 sq mi (1.44 km^{2})

Population (2013)
  - Total: 444
  - Density: 799/sq mi (308/km^{2})
- Time zone: UTC+1 (CET)
  - Summer (DST): UTC+2 (CEST)

Novalići is a village in the municipality of Gradačac, Bosnia and Herzegovina.

== Demographics ==
According to the 2013 census, its population was 444.

Ethnicity in 2013
| Ethnicity | Number | Percentage |
|---|---|---|
| Bosniaks | 442 | 99.5% |
| other/undeclared | 2 | 0.5% |
| Total | 444 | 100% |
