= Avramovina =

- Village
- Location within Bosnia and Herzegovina
- Coordinates: 44°50′05″N 18°30′24″E
- Country: Bosnia and Herzegovina
- Entity: Federation of Bosnia and Herzegovina
- Canton: Tuzla
- Municipality: Gradačac

Area
  - Total: 2.68 sq mi (6.94 km^{2})

Population (2013)
  - Total: 21
  - Density: 7.8/sq mi (3.0/km^{2})
- Time zone: UTC+1 (CET)
  - Summer (DST): UTC+2 (CEST)

Avramovina is a village in the municipality of Gradačac, Bosnia and Herzegovina.

== Demographics ==
According to the 2013 census, its population was 21, all Serbs.
