= Cetnica =

- Village
- Location within Bosnia and Herzegovina
- Coordinates: 44°50′54″N 18°35′15″E
- Country: Bosnia and Herzegovina
- Municipality: Gradačac
- Time zone: UTC+1 (CET)
  - Summer (DST): UTC+2 (CEST)

Cetnica (Serbian Cyrillic: Четница) is a village in the municipality of Gradačac, Bosnia and Herzegovina.
