= FK Pelagićevo =

- Full name: FK Pelagićevo
- Founded: 1958
- Chairman: Danilo Milovanović
- Manager: Niko Savkić
- League: RS 3rd League
Home colours	Away colours

FK Pelagićevo is a football club based in Pelagićevo, Republika Srpska, Bosnia and Herzegovina.
