= Gornje Krečane =

Gornje Krečane Горње Кречане
- Village
- Location within Bosnia and Herzegovina
- Country: Bosnia and Herzegovina
- Entity: Republika Srpska; Federation of Bosnia and Herzegovina
- Region Canton: Doboj; Tuzla
- Municipality: Modriča; Gradačac

Area
  - Total: 1.67 sq mi (4.32 km^{2})

Population (2013)
  - Total: 41
  - Density: 25/sq mi (9.5/km^{2})
- Time zone: UTC+1 (CET)
  - Summer (DST): UTC+2 (CEST)

Gornje Krečane (Cyrillic: Горње Кречане) is a village in the municipalities of Modriča (which is located in Republika Srpska) and Gradačac which is located in the Federation of Bosnia and Herzegovina.

== Demographics ==
According to the 2013 census, its population was 41, all Serbs, with 38 of them living in the Modriča part and 3 in the Gradačac part.
