= Porebrice =

Porebrice Поребрице
- Village
- Location within Bosnia and Herzegovina
- Coordinates: 44°50′34″N 18°33′02″E
- Country: Bosnia and Herzegovina
- Entity: Republika Srpska
- Region: Bijeljina; Tuzla
- Municipality: Pelagićevo

Area
  - Total: 6.40 sq mi (16.57 km^{2})

Population (2013)
  - Total: 421
  - Density: 65.8/sq mi (25.4/km^{2})
- Time zone: UTC+1 (CET)
  - Summer (DST): UTC+2 (CEST)

Porebrice (Cyrillic: Поребрице) is a village in the municipalities of Pelagićevo (Republika Srpska) Bosnia and Herzegovina.

Website: www.porebrice.com

== Demographics ==
According to the 2013 census, its population was 421.

Ethnicity in 2013
| Ethnicity | Number | Percentage |
|---|---|---|
| Serbs | 421 | 100% |
| Total | 421 | 100% |
