= Sibovac =

Sibovac Сибовац
- Village
- Location within Bosnia and Herzegovina
- Coordinates: 44°53′57″N 18°27′27″E
- Country: Bosnia and Herzegovina
- Entity: Federation of Bosnia and Herzegovina
- Canton: Tuzla
- Municipality: Gradačac

Area
  - Total: 1.83 sq mi (4.74 km^{2})

Population (2013)
  - Total: 1,009
  - Density: 551/sq mi (213/km^{2})
- Time zone: UTC+1 (CET)
  - Summer (DST): UTC+2 (CEST)

Sibovac (Cyrillic: Сибовац) is a village in the municipality of Gradačac, Bosnia and Herzegovina. In 1993, it was an object of the Ledenice offensive.

== Demographics ==
According to the 2013 census, its population was 1,009.

Ethnicity in 2013
Ethnicity	Number	Percentage
Bosniaks	990	98.1%
Croats	1	0.1%
other/undeclared	18	1.8%
Total	1,009	100%
