= Biberovo Polje =

- Village
- Location within Bosnia and Herzegovina
- Coordinates: 44°47′N 18°26′E
- Country: Bosnia and Herzegovina
- Entity: Federation of Bosnia and Herzegovina
- Canton: Tuzla
- Municipality: Gradačac

Area
  - Total: 2.34 sq mi (6.06 km^{2})

Population (2013)
  - Total: 730
  - Density: 310/sq mi (120/km^{2})
- Time zone: UTC+1 (CET)
  - Summer (DST): UTC+2 (CEST)

Biberovo Polje is a village in the municipality of Gradačac, Bosnia and Herzegovina.

== Demographics ==
According to the 2013 census, its population was 730.

Ethnicity in 2013
Ethnicity	Number	Percentage
Bosniaks	729	99.9%
other/undeclared	1	0.1%
Total	730	100%
