= Mionica, Bosnia and Herzegovina =

Mionica
- Village
- Location within Bosnia and Herzegovina
- Coordinates: 44°52′02″N 18°27′47″E
- Country: Bosnia and Herzegovina
- Entity: Federation of Bosnia and Herzegovina
- Canton: Tuzla
- Municipality: Gradačac

Area
  - Total: 8.30 sq mi (21.50 km^{2})

Population (2013)
  - Total: 5,483
  - Density: 660.5/sq mi (255.0/km^{2})
- Time zone: UTC+1 (CET)
  - Summer (DST): UTC+2 (CEST)

Mionica is a village in the municipality of Gradačac, Bosnia and Herzegovina.

== Demographics ==
According to the 2013 census, its population was 5,483.

Ethnicity in 2013
| Ethnicity | Number | Percentage |
|---|---|---|
| Bosniaks | 5,372 | 98.0% |
| Croats | 18 | 0.3% |
| Serbs | 5 | 0.1% |
| other/undeclared | 88 | 1.6% |
| Total | 5,483 | 100% |
