= Ahmed Muradbegović =

- Born: 3 March 1898; Gradačac, Condominium of Bosnia and Herzegovina, Austro-Hungarian Empire
- Died: 15 March 1972 (aged 74); Dubrovnik, SR Croatia, Yugoslavia
- Occupation(s): Writer, dramatist, novelist

Ahmed Muradbegović (3 March 1898 – 15 March 1972) was a Bosnian writer, dramatist and novelist.

== Early life ==
Muradbegović was born in the eastern Bosnian town of Gradačac in March 1898, while Bosnia was occupied by the Austro-Hungarian Empire. He attended elementary school in his city of birth, but went to high school in Tuzla, Sarajevo and Bihać, graduating in 1919, after the end of World War I. That same year, he enrolled in law school in Zagreb. After two months of that, he transferred to the Filozofski fakultet Sveučilišta u Zagrebu (Faculty of Philosophy of Zagreb). At the same time, he attended drama school starting in 1920 and completing two years later.

Muradbegović entered literature at the age of 19 in the year 1917, when his poem U krvi i plamenu (In Blood and Fire) was published in a Sarajevo newspaper. Two more of his poems were published in the following two years; Oslobođeni robovi (Freed Slaves) in 1918 and Seda kaduna in 1919. After a two-year break from writing, he released Haremska lirika in 1921.

== Professional career ==
In 1921, Muradbegović became a member of the Croatian National Theatre in Zagreb and an assistant to the theatre director Branko Gavella. He later became a drama teacher and professor at the First Grammar School (Prva realna gimnazija).

During World War II, he worked as the manager of the Sarajevo National Theatre (known as the Croatian State Theatre in Sarajevo between 1941 and 1945), for which he was legally tried. After receiving amnesty, he was appointed correspondent for the Cooperative Union in Gradačac.

In 1947, he was transferred to the City National Theatre in Tuzla where he led the drama section known as the "Mitar Trifunović Učo" and participated in the founding of the National Theatre Tuzla.

In the "Učinoj" drama section, Muradbegović directed the comedy Prosidba i Zelena grana (Proposal and Green Branches). In the National Theatre, he directed Duboko je korijenje (Deep Roots, 1949), Sumnjivo lice (Suspicious Face, 1950) and Hasanaginica (1950). He also directed some of his own works such as Rasemin sevdah (1952) and Majka (Mother, 1953).

Muradbegović moved to Dubrovnik, Croatia in 1954 and became a director and artistic director of the National Theatre there. He participated in the launch of the Dubrovnik Summer Festival.

Between 1956 and 1960, he was Director of Drama in the Banja Luka National Theatre. In 1960, he retired and moved to Dubrovnik, where he spent the rest of life.

== Death ==
He died on 15 March 1972 in Dubrovnik and was buried in Dubrovnik's cemetery Boninovo.

== Legacy ==
On 20 March 1998, a stamp with an image of Muradbegović was issued in Bosnia and Herzegovina to mark 100 years since his birth.

== Works ==
- U krvi i plamenu (1917)
- Oslobođeni robovi (1918)
- Seda kaduna (1919)
- Haremska lirika (1921)
- Prvi cjelov (1921)
- Haremske novele (1924)
- Nojemova ladja (1924)
- Majka, drama u tri čina (1934)
- Na Božjem putu, drama u tri čina (1936)
- Svijet u opancima (1936)
- U vezirovim odajama (1941)
- Husein-beg Gradaščević (1942)
- Omer-Paša Latas u Bosni 1850–1852. (1944)
- Ljubav u planini (1944)
