= Donje Ledenice =

Donje Ledenice Доње Леденице
- Village
- Location within Bosnia and Herzegovina
- Coordinates: 44°54′33″N 18°25′16″E
- Country: Bosnia and Herzegovina
- Entity: Republika Srpska; Federation of Bosnia and Herzegovina
- Region Canton: Bijeljina; Tuzla
- Municipality: Pelagićevo; Gradačac

Area
  - Total: 4.39 sq mi (11.37 km^{2})

Population (2013)
  - Total: 652
  - Density: 149/sq mi (57.3/km^{2})
- Time zone: UTC+1 (CET)
  - Summer (DST): UTC+2 (CEST)

Donje Ledenice (Cyrillic: Доње Леденице) is a village in the municipalities of Pelagićevo (Republika Srpska) and Gradačac, Bosnia and Herzegovina. In 1993, it was an object of the Ledenice offensive.

== Demographics ==
According to the 2013 census, its population was 652, with 48 of them living in the Pelagićevo part and 604 in the Gradačac part.

Ethnicity in 2013
Ethnicity	Number	Percentage
Bosniaks	400	61.3%
Croats	188	28.8%
Serbs	49	7.5%
other/undeclared	15	2.3%
Total	652	100%
