= Rajska =

Rajska Рајска
- Village
- Location within Bosnia and Herzegovina
- Coordinates: 44°51′00″N 18°20′24″E
- Country: Bosnia and Herzegovina
- Entity: Federation of Bosnia and Herzegovina
- Canton: Tuzla
- Municipality: Gradačac

Area
  - Total: 2.80 sq mi (7.26 km^{2})

Population (2013)
  - Total: 956
  - Density: 341/sq mi (132/km^{2})
- Time zone: UTC+1 (CET)
  - Summer (DST): UTC+2 (CEST)

Rajska (Cyrillic: Рајска) is a village in the municipality of Gradačac, Bosnia and Herzegovina.

== Demographics ==
According to the 2013 census, its population was 956.

Ethnicity in 2013
Ethnicity	Number	Percentage
Bosniaks	951	99.5%
Croats	3	0.3%
other/undeclared	2	0.2%
Total	956	100%
