= Srnice Donje =

- Village
- Location within Bosnia and Herzegovina
- Coordinates: 44°47′30″N 18°28′27″E
- Country: Bosnia and Herzegovina
- Entity: Federation of Bosnia and Herzegovina
- Canton: Tuzla
- Municipality: Gradačac

Area
  - Total: 3.73 sq mi (9.66 km^{2})

Population (2013)
  - Total: 404
  - Density: 108/sq mi (41.8/km^{2})
- Time zone: UTC+1 (CET)
  - Summer (DST): UTC+2 (CEST)

Srnice Donje is a village in the municipality of Gradačac, Bosnia and Herzegovina.

== Demographics ==
According to the 2013 census, its population was 404.

Ethnicity in 2013
Ethnicity	Number	Percentage
Bosniaks	323	80.0%
Serbs	68	16.8%
Croats	2	0.5%
other/undeclared	11	2.7%
Total	404	100%
