= Gornja Međiđa =

- Village
- Location within Bosnia and Herzegovina
- Coordinates: 44.7969536°N 18.3329736°E
- Country: Bosnia and Herzegovina
- Entity: Republika Srpska; Federation of Bosnia and Herzegovina
- Region Canton: Doboj; Tuzla
- Municipality: Doboj; Gradačac

Area
  - Total: 4.90 sq mi (12.68 km^{2})

Population (2013)
  - Total: 1,310
  - Density: 268/sq mi (103/km^{2})
- Time zone: UTC+1 (CET)
  - Summer (DST): UTC+2 (CEST)

Gornja Međiđa is a village in the municipalities of Doboj (Republika Srpska) and Gradačac, Bosnia and Herzegovina.

== Demographics ==
According to the 2013 census, its population was 1,310, with none of them living in the Doboj part thus all in the Gradačac part.

Ethnicity in 2013
Ethnicity	Number	Percentage
Bosniaks	1,305	99.6%
Serbs	1	0.1%
other/undeclared	4	0.3%
Total	1,310	100%
