= Jasenica (Gradačac) =

Jasenica Јасеница
- Village
- Location within Bosnia and Herzegovina
- Coordinates: 44°50′35″N 18°20′41″E
- Country: Bosnia and Herzegovina
- Entity: Republika Srpska; Federation of Bosnia and Herzegovina
- Region Canton: Doboj; Tuzla
- Municipality: Modriča; Gradačac

Area
  - Total: 3.39 sq mi (8.77 km^{2})

Population (2013)
  - Total: 269
  - Density: 79.4/sq mi (30.7/km^{2})
- Time zone: UTC+1 (CET)
  - Summer (DST): UTC+2 (CEST)

Jasenica (Gradačac) (Cyrillic: Јасеница) is a village in the municipalities of Modriča (Republika Srpska) and Gradačac, Bosnia and Herzegovina.

== Demographics ==
According to the 2013 census, its population was 269, with 46 of them living in the Modriča part and 223 in the Gradačac part.

Ethnicity in 2013
Ethnicity	Number	Percentage
Bosniaks	218	81.0%
Serbs	46	17.1%
other/undeclared	5	1.9%
Total	269	100%
