= Gornje Ledenice =

Gornje Ledenice Горње Леденице
- Village
- Location within Bosnia and Herzegovina
- Coordinates: 44°55′00″N 18°27′17″E
- Country: Bosnia and Herzegovina
- Entity: Republika Srpska; Federation of Bosnia and Herzegovina
- Region Canton: Bijeljina; Tuzla
- Municipality: Pelagićevo; Gradačac

Area
  - Total: 1.99 sq mi (5.16 km^{2})

Population (2013)
  - Total: 485
  - Density: 243/sq mi (94.0/km^{2})
- Time zone: UTC+1 (CET)
  - Summer (DST): UTC+2 (CEST)

Gornje Ledenice (Cyrillic: Горње Леденице) is a village in the municipalities of Pelagićevo (Republika Srpska) and Gradačac, Bosnia and Herzegovina. In 1993, it was an object of the Ledenice offensive.

== Demographics ==
According to the 2013 census, its population was 485, with 10 of them living in the Pelagićevo part and 475 in the Gradačac part.

Ethnicity in 2013
| Ethnicity | Number | Percentage |
|---|---|---|
| Bosniaks | 466 | 96.1% |
| Serbs | 10 | 2.1% |
| other/undeclared | 9 | 1.9% |
| Total | 485 | 100% |
