= Jelovče Selo =

- Village
- Location within Bosnia and Herzegovina
- Coordinates: 44°49′N 18°26′E
- Country: Bosnia and Herzegovina
- Entity: Federation of Bosnia and Herzegovina
- Canton: Tuzla
- Municipality: Gradačac

Area
  - Total: 2.51 sq mi (6.50 km^{2})

Population (2013)
  - Total: 1,369
  - Density: 545/sq mi (211/km^{2})
- Time zone: UTC+1 (CET)
  - Summer (DST): UTC+2 (CEST)

Jelovče Selo is a village in the municipality of Gradačac, Bosnia and Herzegovina.

== Demographics ==
According to the 2013 census, its population was 1,369.

Ethnicity in 2013
Ethnicity	Number	Percentage
Bosniaks	1,362	99.5%
other/undeclared	7	0.5%
Total	1,369	100%
