= Bosniak National Council (North Macedonia) =

Representative body of ethnic minority in North Macedonia

- Bošnjačko nacionalno vijeće
- Abbreviation: BNV
- Formation: 19 June 2019
- Founded at: Skopje, North Macedonia
- Type: Political organisation
- Purpose: Rights of the Bosniak minority
- Headquarters: Skopje, North Macedonia
- Official language: Bosnian
- President: Dževad Hot

Bosniak National Council (BNV) is the highest representative body of the Bosniaks in North Macedonia.

== History ==
The Bosniak National Council in the area of North Macedonia was established on June 19, 2019, and consists of the associations Merhamet, Preporod, Divanhana, Glas Orizara, and the Bosniak Cultural Center. It was founded after a year of successful cooperation among the mentioned associations, to improve the status of the Bosniak people in all spheres of society in North Macedonia.

Bosniaks are a constitutionally recognized ethnic community in North Macedonia, and thus the Bosniak National Council aims to protect, develop, and promote the national, religious, and cultural interests of the Bosniak people in that country. In addition, the Council aims to protect the cultural and historical monuments of the Bosniak people in North Macedonia, striving to preserve, affirm, and promote greater official and public use of the Bosnian language and script within the central and local government units, the educational process, and public information services. The Council also advocates for greater representation of Bosniaks in state institutions and the improvement of cross-border cooperation.

By amending the Law on Holidays of Macedonia on February 8, 2007, the Macedonian Assembly proclaimed September 28 (the day when representatives of the Bosniak people at the Second Assembly in Sarajevo reclaimed their national name Bosniak) as the International Day of Bosniaks, a holiday for members of the Bosniak community in North Macedonia. This day is commemorated by the Bosniak National Council and is a non-working day for Bosniaks in North Macedonia. This day is also celebrated as the national day of the Bosniaks of Kosovo.

The Bosniak National Council participates in the work of the Regional Office for the Coordination of Bosniak Councils based in Sarajevo. The Office for the Coordination of Bosniak Councils consists of representative bodies and national institutions of Bosniaks from the countries of the former SFR Yugoslavia, and it was established at the beginning of 2018.

Bosniak National Council organizes traditional "March for Srebrenica", to commemorate the Srebrenica genocide.
