= Gornji Lukavac, Gradačac =

Gornji Lukavac
- Village
- Location within Bosnia and Herzegovina
- Coordinates: 44.852179°N 18.3958769°E
- Country: Bosnia and Herzegovina
- Entity: Federation of Bosnia and Herzegovina
- Canton: Tuzla
- Municipality: Gradačac

Area
  - Total: 3.49 sq mi (9.04 km^{2})

Population (2013)
  - Total: 1,384
  - Density: 397/sq mi (153/km^{2})
- Time zone: UTC+1 (CET)
  - Summer (DST): UTC+2 (CEST)

Gornji Lukavac is a village in the municipality of Gradačac, Bosnia and Herzegovina.

== Demographics ==
According to the 2013 census, its population was 1,384.

Ethnicity in 2013
Ethnicity	Number	Percentage
Bosniaks	1,369	98.9%
other/undeclared	15	1.1%
Total	1,384	100%
