= Krčevljani =

Krčevljani Крчевљани (Serbian)
- Village (Selo)
- Location within Bosnia and Herzegovina
- Coordinates: 44°51′N 18°17′E
- Country: Bosnia and Herzegovina
- Entity: Republika Srpska
- Municipality: Modriča
- Time zone: UTC+1 (CET)
  - Summer (DST): UTC+2 (CEST)

Krčevljani (Cyrillic: Крчевљани) is a village in the municipality of Modriča, Bosnia and Herzegovina.
