= Veliko Čajno =

- Village
- Location within Bosnia and Herzegovina
- Coordinates: 44.0289957°N 18.1971574°E
- Country: Bosnia and Herzegovina
- Entity: Federation of Bosnia and Herzegovina
- Canton: Zenica-Doboj
- Municipality: Visoko

Area
  - Total: 0.44 sq mi (1.15 km^{2})

Population (2013)
  - Total: 684
  - Density: 1,540/sq mi (595/km^{2})
- Time zone: UTC+1 (CET)
  - Summer (DST): UTC+2 (CEST)

Veliko Čajno is a village in the municipality of Visoko, Bosnia and Herzegovina.

== Demographics ==
According to the 2013 census, its population was 684.

Ethnicity in 2013
Ethnicity	Number	Percentage
Bosniaks	674	98.5%
other/undeclared	10	1.5%
Total	684	100%
