= Ferid Muhić =

Macedonian philosopher

Ferid Muhić (Macedonian: Ферид Мухиќ; born 1943) is President of the Bosniak Academy of Sciences and Arts. He is a professor of Philosophy at the Ss. Cyril and Methodius University in Skopje, North Macedonia. He started his academic career as Assistant at the Institute for Sociological Research in Skopje in 1970. He entered the Department of Philosophy as Assistant in 1974; Associate Professor 1976–1980; Full-time Professor 1980–present. Visiting professor at Sorbonne, New York's Syracuse University, Florida State University, International Institute of Islamic Thought and Civilisation, and several universities in Southern-East Europe. Main professional specialties: contemporary philosophy, cultural anthropology, aesthetics and political philosophy.

== Books ==
- Methods of Criticism, 1977
- Revolutions and Class Struggles, 1978;
- Philosophy of Iconoclasm, 1983,
- BiH; Motivation and Meditation, 1988;
- The Shield of Gold 1988
  - nine editions so far, translated in Macedonian, English, French, Albanian and Turkish
  - first edition published in Yugoslavia;
- Noumenology of the Body, 1994
- Soul's Rose, 1994;
- The Language of Philosophy, 1995;
- Macedonia: Catena Mundi, 1995;
- Sense and Virtue, 1996;
- Yugoslavia and After
- The Great Building and Other Conversations with the Unknown One, 2001
- Logos and Hierarchy, 2001

=== Poetry ===
Ferid Muhić has also published three books of poetry:

- Falco Peregrinus, 1988;
- A Hundred Steps Above, 1994;
- The Smoke From The Dream-ends, 1996.

== Online essays ==
- Austrian Heads, short story
- The Tzar Bird essay
