= Bosniak Academy of Sciences and Arts =

- Bošnjačka akademija nauka i umjetnosti
- Abbreviation: BANU
- Formation: 2011
- Type: National academy
- Purpose: Science, arts, academics
- Headquarters: Sarajevo, Bosnia and Herzegovina
- Region served: Bosnia and Herzegovina, Serbia
- Members: 22
- President: Mehmed Akšamija
- President of the Senate: Mustafa Cerić
- Key people: Mustafa Cerić, Ferid Muhić, Šerbo Rastoder, Ejup Ganić
- Website: http://banu.eu.com/

The Bosniak Academy of Sciences and Arts (Bosnian: Bošnjačka akademija nauka i umjetnosti, BANU) is an academic institution in Bosnia and Herzegovina. The institution is based in Sarajevo and has divisions in both Sarajevo and Novi Pazar to better reflect Bosniak interests in Bosnia and Herzegovina and Sandžak.

The institution was founded on 9 July 2011 in Novi Pazar under the initiative of Muamer Zukorlić, chief Mufti of the Islamic Community in Serbia. As per the decision of the founding assembly, Ferid Muhić was unilaterally proclaimed president while Dževad Jahić and Lamija Hadžiosmanović were named vice-presidents. The Grand Mufti of Bosnia, Dr. Mustafa ef. Cerić, was proclaimed President of the Senate.

== Prominent members ==
- Mustafa ef. Cerić, Grand Mufti (founder)
- Muhamed Filipović, historian
- Ferid Muhić, historian
- Nedžad Ibrišimović, author
- Šerbo Rastoder, politician
- Ejup Ganić, politician
- Muamer Zukorlić, Mufti
