= Pelagićevo =

Town and municipality in Bosnia and Herzegovina

Pelagićevo Пелагићево
- Village and municipality
- Coat of arms

- Location of Pelagićevo within Bosnia and Herzegovina

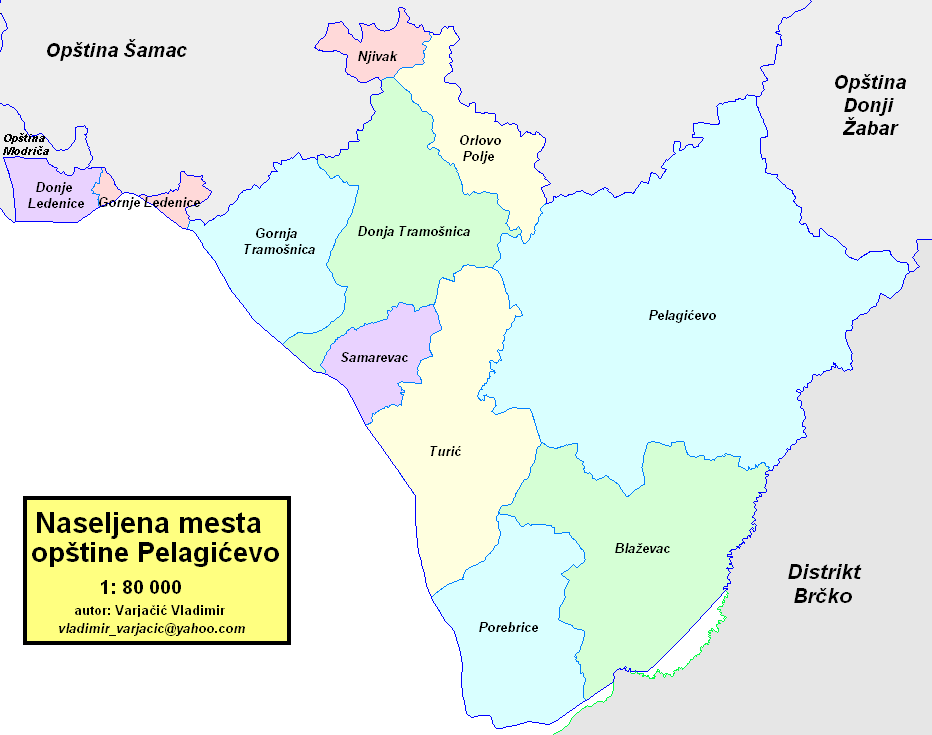
- Coordinates: 44.90°N 18.61°E
- Country: Bosnia and Herzegovina
- Entity: Republika Srpska
- Named for: Vasa Pelagić

Government
  - Municipal mayor: Slavko Tešić (SNSD)
  - Municipality: 122.49 km^{2} (47.29 sq mi)

Population (2013 census)
  - Village: 2,529
  - Municipality: 5,220
  - Municipality density: 42.6/km^{2} (110/sq mi)
- Time zone: UTC+1 (CET)
  - Summer (DST): UTC+2 (CEST)
- Area code: 54

Pelagićevo (Serbian Cyrillic: Пелагићево) is a village and municipality in Republika Srpska, Bosnia and Herzegovina. It is located in the Posavina geographical region. As of 2013, the village has a population of 2,529 inhabitants, while the municipality has 5,220 inhabitants.

It was originally named Gornji Žabar (Serbian Cyrillic: Горњи Жабар) until 1970, when it was renamed after Vasa Pelagić, a representative of utopian socialism in Serbia during the second half of the nineteenth century, born in the village in 1833.

== History ==
The municipality was created after the Dayton Agreement from part of the pre-war municipality of Gradačac (the other part of the pre-war municipality is now in the Federation of Bosnia and Herzegovina).

== Demographics ==
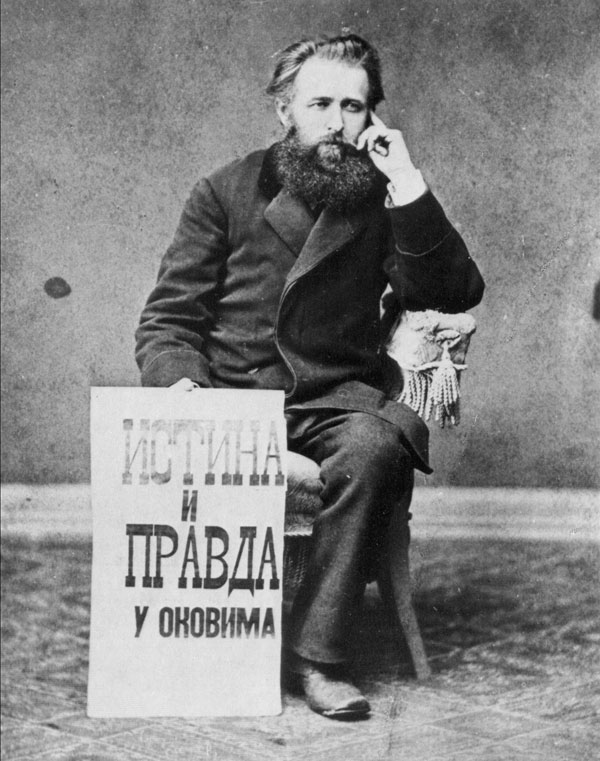
Vaso Pelagić, the namesake of the municipality

=== Population ===
Population of settlements – Pelagićevo municipality
	Settlements	1971.	1981.	1991.	2013.
	Total			13,256	5,220
1	Blaževac				318
2	Donja Tramošnica				381
3	Gornja Tramošnica				347
4	Pelagićevo	3,398	3,214	3,069	2,529
5	Porebrice				344
6	Turić				293

=== Ethnic composition ===
Ethnic composition – Pelagićevo village
	2013.	1991.	1981.	1971.
Total	2,529 (100,0%)	3,069 (100,0%)	3,214 (100,0%)	3,398 (100,0%)
Serbs	2,502 (98,93%)	2,968 (96,71%)	3,103 (96,55%)	3,340 (98,29%)
Croats	12 (0,474%)	16 (0,521%)	22 (0,685%)	36 (1,059%)
Others	10 (0,395%)	34 (1,108%)	31 (0,965%)	13 (0,383%)
Muslims/Bosniaks	5 (0,198%)	4 (0,130%)	5 (0,156%)	6 (0,177%)
Yugoslavs		47 (1,531%)	47 (1,462%)	
Macedonians			4 (0,124%)	2 (0,059%)
Albanians			2 (0,062%)	
Montenegrins				1 (0,029%)

Ethnic composition – Pelagićevo municipality
	2013.	1991.
Total	5,220 (100,0%)	13,256 (100,0%)
Serbs	3,330 (63,79%)	4,634 (34,96%)
Croats	1,850 (35,44%)	7,165 (54,05%)
Others	27 (0,517%)	721 (5,439%)
Muslims/Bosniaks	13 (0,249%)	736 (5,552%)

== Sport ==
The town has a football club, FK Pelagićevo.

== See also ==
- Municipalities of Bosnia and Herzegovina
