= Zavidovići =

Zavidovići Завидовићи
- City
- Grad Zavidovići; Град Завидовићи; City of Zavidovići
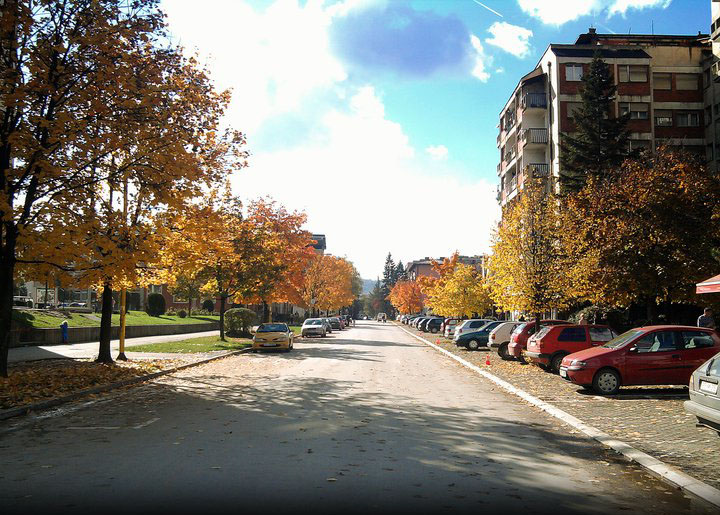
- Zavidovići

- Location of Zavidovići municipality (općina) within Bosnia and Herzegovina.

- Location of Zavidovići
- Coordinates: 44°27′N 18°09′E
- Country: Bosnia and Herzegovina
- Entity: Federation of Bosnia and Herzegovina
- Canton: Zenica-Doboj

Government
  - Mayor: Erna Merdić Smailhodžić (SDA)

Area
  - City: 590.3 km^{2} (227.9 sq mi)
  - Urban: 4.74 km^{2} (1.83 sq mi)

Population (2013 census)
  - City: 35,988
  - Density: 60.97/km^{2} (157.9/sq mi)
  - Urban: 8,174
- Time zone: UTC+1 (CET)
  - Summer (DST): UTC+2 (CEST)
- Postal code: 72220
- Area code: +387 32
- Website: www.zavidovici.ba

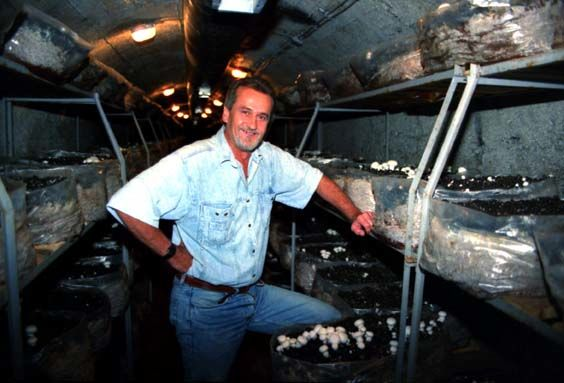
Mushroom cultivation in an anti-aerial bunker in Zavidovići, 1999. Development project financed by the Local Democracy Embassy at Zavidovići

Zavidovići is a city and municipality located in Zenica-Doboj Canton of the Federation of Bosnia and Herzegovina, an entity of Bosnia and Herzegovina. It is situated in central Bosnia and Herzegovina, located between Doboj and Zenica on the confluence of rivers Bosna, Krivaja and Gostović. It sits in a valley surrounded by many mountains of which the largest is Klek. As of 2013, the municipality had a population of 35,988 inhabitants and the city itself 8,174.

== History ==
Zavidovići was home to two neolithic cultures: Butmir and Kakanj. Significant Kakanj culture site is located in Tuk.

Zavidovići was developed by the Austrians during the 19th century Austro-Hungarian reign in Bosnia, mostly because of the "wood industry". After World War II, Krivaja, the company that was founded in 1884 and named after the Krivaja river, expanded. The company focused on furniture manufacturing, which it began to export to the United States under the name "Krivaja Beechbrook". Due to the Bosnian War in the 1990s, the former giant and the city were left with almost nothing.

Although once a diverse town, many of the former Serb and Croat residents left their homes during the Bosnian War. Few have returned to their properties. Now, it is a mostly Bosniak city, with few non-Bosniaks remaining.

Zavidovići's nickname is "Wood Town". Zavidovići is located in the basin of three rivers: Bosna, Krivaja and Gostović.

== Geography ==
=== Mountains ===
- Klek
- Tajan Mountain (mountain park, with lots of peaks.)

== Demographics ==
The city of Zavidovići itself had 12,947 residents in 1991.

Ethnic Composition
Bosniaks	Serbs	Croats	Yugoslavs	Others	Total
1961
17,758 48.99%	11,119 30.67%	6,528 18.01%	649 1.79%	196 0.54%	36,250
1971
24,803 56,34%	11.031 25,06%	7,457 16,94%	353 0.80%	374 0.86%	44,018
1981
29,289 56.48%	11,202 21.60%	7,451 14.37%	3,234 6.24%	685 1.32%	51,861
1991
34,198 59.83%	11,640 20.36%	7,576 13.25%	2,726 4.77%	1,024 1.79%	57,164
2013
32,735 90.96%	573 1.59%	1,204 3.34%	0.00 0.00%	1,278 3.55%	35,988

== Settlements ==
- Borovnica
- Dubravica
- Bajvati
- Gornji Junuzovići
- Gostovići
- Hajderovići
- Hrge
- Kamenica
- Karačić
- Krivaja
- Stipovići
- Poljice
- Krčevine
- Kućice
- Lijevča
- Mahoje
- Majdan
- Miljevići
- Mitrovići
- Mustajbašići
- Osječani
- Petkovići
- Perovići
- Podvolujak
- Dolovi
- Lovnica
- Potkleče
- Predražići
- Priluk
- Ribnica
- Ridžali
- Rujnica
- Sinanovići
- Skroze
- Stavci
- Suha
- Svinjašnica
- Spasojevići
- Vikovići
- Vozuća
- Vukmanovići
- Vukovine
- Vrbica
- Zavidovići

== Notable people ==
- Edin Bašić, handball player
- Alija Bešić, Bosnian-born Luxembourgian footballer
- Mladen Bartolović, Croatian footballer
- Aida Čorbadžić, opera singer
- Malkica Dugeč (1936-2026), Croatian writer and dissident
- Šefik Džaferović, politician, the vice president of SDA and the Bosniak Member of the Presidency of Bosnia and Herzegovina
- Šemsudin Gegić, playwright and film director
- Karlo Kiseli, Croatian writer
- Venio Losert, Croatian handball player and two-time Olympic gold-medallist
- Ferid Muhić, president of the Bosniak Academy of Sciences and Arts
- Monika Radulovic, Australian model
- Nedžad Sinanović, basketball player
- Safet Sušić, footballer and football manager
- Sead Sušić, footballer

== Twin towns – sister cities ==
Zavidovići is twinned with:

- Berane, Montenegro
- Bozüyük, Turkey
- Gemlik, Turkey
- Kakanj, Bosnia and Herzegovina
- Nilüfer, Turkey
- Roncadelle, Italy
- Wiltz, Luxembourg
- Yunusemre, Turkey
